= Mabel Juli =

Australian artist (c. 1931)

Mabel Juli (born c.1931) is a contemporary artist from the East Kimberley in Western Australia.

== Early life ==
Juli was born in c.1931 or 1932 at Five Mile, near Moola Boola Station. Her traditional name is Wiringoon and her traditional country is Barlinyin, also known as Springvale, south of Warmun.

== Career ==
Juli commenced painting in the 1980s after observing and being encouraged by artists Rover Thomas and Queenie McKenzie. She reports that she "started thinking about my country, I gave it a try." She is best known for her striking black and white paintings of Garnkiny doo Wardel (Moon and Star) based on the Ngarranggarni story passed down from her parents, but focussing on Ngarranggarniny which is when the Dreaming ancestors laid down and became the landscape of the East Kimberley in Western Australia. An innovator, she also extended the range of use of traditional colours of the Gija palette to include pink, purple and green.

Juli continues to work at the Warmun Art Centre. Her art is included in the collections of the Art Gallery of South Australia, National Gallery of Victoria, Art Gallery of New South Wales, Artbank, Berndt Museum, University of Western Australia, Parliament of Western Australia Art Collection, the Auckland Art Gallery Toi o Tāmaki, New Zealand, and the National Gallery of Australia.

== Recognition and awards ==
- Winner, Kate Challis RAKA Award for Visual Arts in 2013 for her painting Under The Sun.
- Finalist, Telstra National Aboriginal and Torres Strait Art Award in 2018
- Work featured on the sails of the Sydney Opera House in 2020.
- In 2020 Juli featured as one of six artists in the ABC TV series This Place: Artist Series. The series is a partnership between the Australian Broadcasting Corporation and the National Gallery of Australia, in which the producers travelled to the countries of "some of Australia's greatest Indigenous artists to share stories about their work, their country, and their communities".
- Featured in the 2020-2021 National Gallery of Australia's Know My Name – "an initiative of the National Gallery of Australia to celebrate the significant contributions of Australian women artists"
- Awarded the Red Ochre Award for Lifetime Achievement at the 2024 First Nations Arts and Culture Awards.
