= Yannima Tommy Watson =

Pitjantjatjara-speaking Indigenous Australian artist (1935–2017)

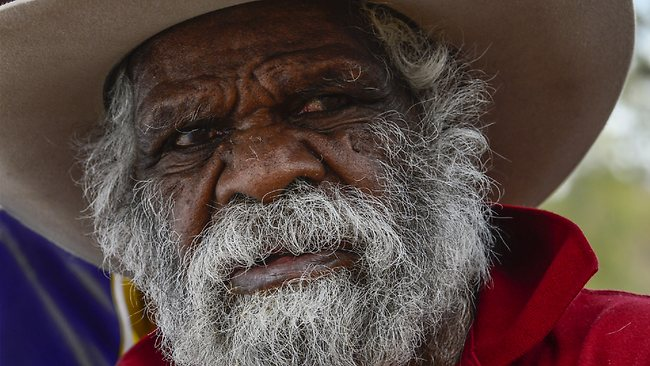
- Tommy Watson 2013
- Born: Yannima Pikarli; 1930s Anamarapiti, Western Australia
- Died: November 2017; Alice Springs
- Known for: Painting
- Movement: Contemporary Indigenous Australian art

Yannima Tommy Watson (1930s – November 2017), known as Tommy Watson, was an Indigenous Australian artist, of the Pitjantjatjara people from Australia's central western desert. He was described by one critic as "the greatest living painter of the Western Desert".

== Early life ==
Tommy Yannima Pikarli Watson was a senior Pitjantjatara elder and law man of the Karima skin group. He was born around 1935 in Anumarapiti, 75 kilometres (47 mi) west of Irrunytju, also known as Wingellina, in Western Australia, near the junction of its border with the Northern Territory and South Australia. His given names of Yannima and Pikarli relate to specific sites near Anumarapiti.

Watson's mother died during his infancy, and his father when he was about eight years old. He subsequently went to live with his father's brother, who himself died two years later. Tommy was then adopted by Nicodemus Watson, his father's first cousin. It was at this point that he went to live at Ernabella Mission, and adopted the surname Watson in addition to his Aboriginal birth name, thus becoming Tommy Yannima Pikarli Watson.

Nicodemus Watson became a strong father figure. Together they travelled widely, and Watson learned the traditional skills required to lead a nomadic existence in the desert, including the fashioning of tools and weapons from trees using burning coals, how and what to hunt, and how and where to find water. Under Nicodemus Watson's guidance, Watson learned about nature and his people's ancestral stories, collectively known to the Aboriginal peoples of Australia as Tjukurrpa.

Watson's first contact with white Australians was at the Ernabella Mission in South Australia, which opened in 1940. After a short time at Ernabella, he returned to his community to be initiated. Tommy Watson's upbringing is similar to that of many Indigenous people born around the same time, from that point forward living a traditional nomadic existence until his early teens and then working as a stockman and labourer. During his time working at Papunya he met the school teacher Geoffrey Bardon, who was pivotal in supporting the developing Aboriginal art movement at the Papunya Tula art centre.

== Art career ==
Tommy Watson began painting in 2001, and was one of a handful of painters establishing the Irrunytju community art centre in 2001. However, he left that community with two relations and, after a period of exploitation in Alice Springs, was found by dealer John Ioannou in a tent in the desert. Ioannou then set up galleries in Sydney and Melbourne and promoted Watson's career. Unfortunately, operating outside the official community art centre system, Watson's mature paintings were boycotted by institutions.

Watson's work has received critical acclaim, both within Australia and internationally, with art critics drawing parallels between Watson and Western Abstract painters such as Wassily Kandinsky, Piet Mondrian, Kasimir Malevich, Mark Rothko and Barnett Newman. John MacDonald wrote in the Sydney Morning Herald that Watson "is a master of invention and arguably the outstanding painter of the Western Desert", going on to compare his use of colour to Henri Matisse.

In 2003 Watson was one of eight Indigenous artists, alongside Paddy Bedford, John Mawurndjul, Ningura Napurrula, Lena Nyadbi, Michael Riley, Judy Watson and Gulumbu Yunupingu, who collaborated on a commission to provide works that decorate one of the Musée du quai Branly's four buildings completed in 2006.

In early 2013, Watson left Ioannou to live with family in Alice Springs in the Northern Territory. Following an improvement in his health he resumed painting, producing large works up to five metres long. Until the end of his life he was represented commercially by Yanda Aboriginal Art and Piermarq, with large canvases produced at Yanda Aboriginal Art in 2013 selling over $800,000 each. One work, entitled Ngayuku Ngura - Anumara Piti, sold for around $500,000 through Sydney's Piermarq gallery to prominent Sydney businessman Andrew Wise.

In 2014, a major work of 160 x 485 cm by Tommy Watson was exhibited at The European Fine Art Fair (TEFAF), one of the world's most prestigious art fairs. Watson's work was also on display as part of a group exhibition of First Contact Western Desert Masters also featuring Naata Nungurrayi, Esther Giles Nampitjinpa, and George Hairbrush Tjungurrayi at the Piermarq gallery in Sydney in June–July 2014.

In 2014 the Art Series Hotel Group named Watson as the first Indigenous artist to feature in the collection. Located in Adelaide, his namesake hotel The Watson features a collection of high-quality reproduction prints.

== Style ==
Tommy Watson was known for his use of strong vibrant colours, that symbolically represented the ancestral stories of his country. Judith Ryan, Senior Curator of Indigenous Art at the National Gallery of Victoria, has described Watson's colour as "incandescent". Watson's understanding of Australia's physical environment and its relationship with the ancestral stories came to form the central element of his paintings. Watson created his works on premium Belgian linen and favoured Ara Acrylic paint, created by the Gerrit Rietveld Academie. Tommy has been associated with the 'Colour Power' movement that developed within the Indigenous art scene between 1984 and 2004.

Watson himself stated that his art is an exploration of traditional Aboriginal culture, in which the land and spirituality are intertwined and communicated through stories passed on from generation to generation. He said, "I want to paint these stories so that others can learn and understand about our culture and country."

== Collections ==
- Art Gallery of New South Wales
- National Gallery of Australia
- National Gallery of Victoria
- Musee du Quai Branly, Paris
- Art Gallery of Western Australia
- South Australian Art Gallery
- Museum and Art Gallery of the Northern Territory
- Bega Valley Regional Gallery
- Colin Laverty, Collection
- Patrick Corrigan, Collection
- Auscorp Collection
- Kerry Stokes Collection

== Artwork ==
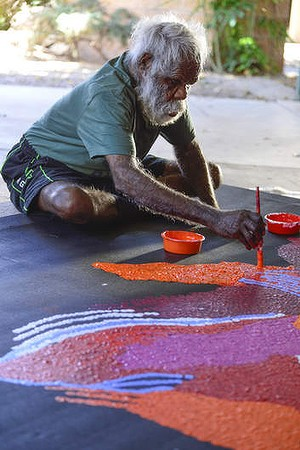
Tommy Watson, painting at Yanda 2013
