= Lena Nyadbi =

Australian artist (1936–2024)

Lena Nyadbi AO
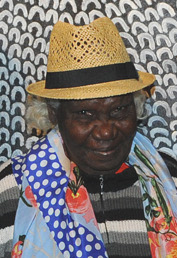
- Lena Nyadbi standing in front of her most notable work, Dayiwul Lirlmim (Paris, June 2013)
- Born: circa 1936; Warnmarnjulugun lagoon, Western Australia
- Died: 7 July 2024 (aged 87-88)
- Known for: Painting, installation art
- Notable work: Dayiwul Lirlmim

Lena Nyadbi AO (1936 – 7 July 2024) was an Australian contemporary Indigenous Australian artist from the Warmun Community in the Kimberley region of Western Australia. Her works include Dayiwul Lirlmim, details of which were painted on the roof of the Musée du quai Branly in Paris. The resulting installation can only be seen from the air, including the Eiffel Tower and Google Earth.

== Early life ==
Lena Nyadbi, of the Gija people, by her own estimate, was born circa 1936 at Warnmarnjulugun lagoon near Greenvale Station in the East Kimberley region of Western Australia. Her father and mother died whilst she was at a young age, and she was raised by her older sister, Goody Barrett, on Lissadell Station.

From a young age, Nyadbi served as an indentured labourer on cattle stations in the region. She learned milking of cows, cattle mustering and how to ride horses which were not broken. Nyadbi recalls the station mistress would drag her to the kitchens and would teach her by force to carry cups of tea without spilling any. In 1968 when the Conciliation and Arbitration Commission ruled that indigenous cattle station workers would be paid the same as their non-indigenous counterparts, Nyadbi along with many Gija people were forced to relocate to the Warmun Community. In the 1970s the Warmun Art Movement was formed, and it during this time that Nyadbi lived amongst artists such as Hector Jandany, Queenie McKenzie, Rover Thomas, Jack Britten, Paddy Jaminji and George Mung Mung.

== Artistic career ==
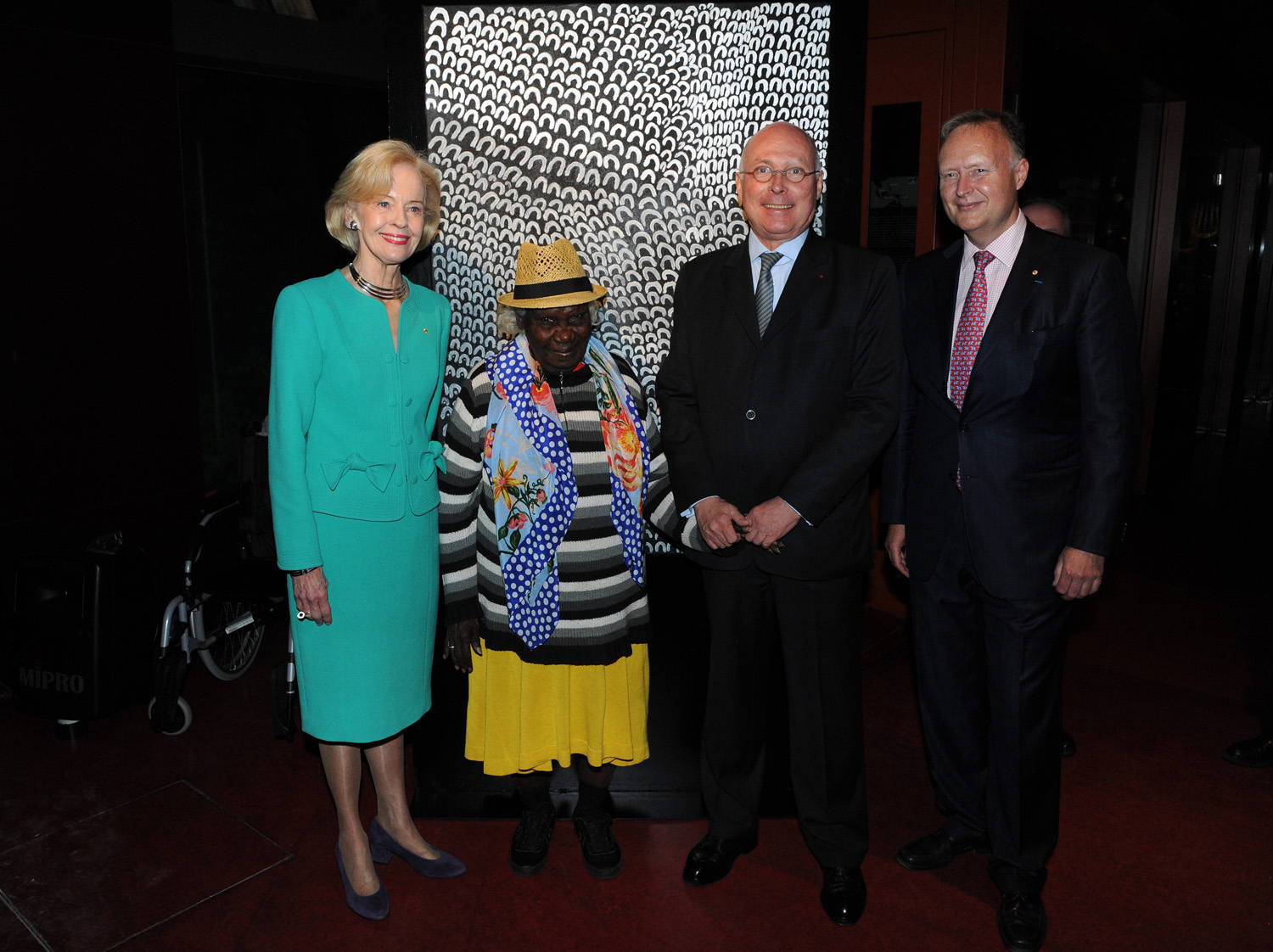
From left to right: Australian Governor-General Quentin Bryce, Lena Nyadbi, Director of the Musée du quai Branly Stéphane Martin and Australia Council for the Arts Chair Rupert Myer at the Musée du quai Branly in Paris for the handover ceremony of Dayiwul Lirlmim (in background) in June 2013.

In 1998, the same year the Warmun Art Centre opened its doors, Nyadbi began painting full-time. Nyadbi had spent many years watching and learning from the other artists in Warmun, and her mentor, Paddy Jaminji, taught her the time-honoured techniques of grinding ochre and charcoal, and using her hands to place the charcoal onto a canvas. Nyadbi isn't the only artist that utilizes ochre as it's been a fundamental material of aboriginal Australian art for thousands of years to paint dreamtime stories. Due to ochres naturally limited colour profile, you'll observe similar colour schemes throughout her artwork; historically, this allowed aboriginal artists to focus on colour relationship and the manner in which they affect one another. Nyadbi creates her own paint and her style is known for its "rich, spare aesthetic", as well as her "preference for strongly contrasting colours" and "repeated 'stanzas' of symbols" that pair with her ancestral narratives.

Nyadbi typically painted two dreaming stories (ngarranggarni in the Gija language); the Jimbirlam Ngarranggarni (Spearhead Dreaming) and Dayiwul Lirlmim Ngarranggarni (Barramundi Scales Dreaming). Her Jimbirlam Ngarranggarni pieces tell the story of the country of her father to the north and east of the Warmun Community on the Doon Doon side of the Great Northern Highway, whilst her Dayiwul Lirlmim Ngarranggarni works tell the story of the land of her mother, the Dayiwul Country which is the location of the Argyle Diamond Mine. Respectfully, the "vertical strokes" in Nyadbi's paintings illustrate Spearhead Dreaming, while the "semi-circular shapes" illustrate Barramundi Dreaming.

In 2002, director of the Musée du quai Branly, Stéphane Martin, and the museums architect Jean Nouvel, enlisted the help of then-French President Jacques Chirac to have the Australian government and the Australia Council for the Arts find indigenous Australian artists for a project, which would see their art being displayed on the then-unopened museum in ways reminiscent of their traditional ways–on walls, windows and ceilings. A total of eight Aboriginal artists were chosen to have their works displayed for the project; amongst them was Nyadbi.

The piece Jimbirlam and Kumerra, also referred to as Jimbirla and Gemerre, meaning Spearheads and Scarifications, was originally a black-and-white piece, but it was decided by the museum to convert it to a grey-on-grey piece, so that it would fit in with the aesthetics of the Haussmannian buildings across from the museum. Early experiments for the templates which would eventually be placed on the museum exterior wall were rejected by Nyadbi because they lacked contrast and she believed it made her artwork look like sausages. Her initial reluctance to approve the template designs almost led to her being ejected from the project. The resultant rendering of the piece is now found on an exterior wall of the museum and is visible from rue de l'Université.

=== Hideout ===
Nyadbi's 2002 painting Hideout depicts the story of her family when they were forced to take shelter in a cave from "murderous pastoralists" who were chasing after them; this was a story that she'd hear as she grew up. Eventually her family made it out of the cave through a different opening and made their way above to a ridge where they watched the gadiya (white people) shoot into the area in front of the cave in search of them. The bottom portion of Hideout depicts the cave where her family hid, as well as a nearby site belonging to an ancestral bat, and a gathering place where Gija people would grind seeds and prepare food. Hideout is largely a contrast of black and white ochre, but is remedied by a stanza of red spearheads in the top half of her painting. Nyadbi's combination of symbols and different locations brings together the past, present, and ancestral times (Ngarrangkarni).

=== Dayiwul Lirlmim ===
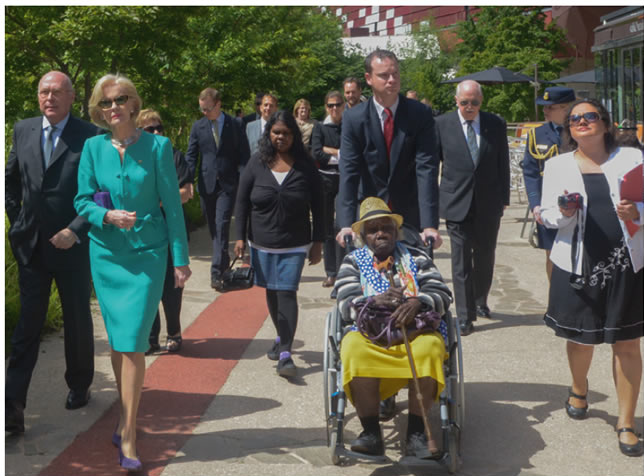
Nyadbi in Paris for the unveiling of the installation of Dayiwul Lirlmim on the rooftop of the Musée du quai Branly (June 2013)

During a 2011 meeting with Harold Mitchell, Stéphane Martin presented a plan to transform part of the roof of the museum into a display of Aboriginal art, continuing on from the previous works of indigenous artists being made part of the fabric of the museum. Mitchell, who saw the opportunity of gaining increased exposure of Aboriginal art, given the roof can be viewed from the Eiffel Tower, agreed to help. After approaches to the Australia Council for the Arts, a committee, which included Art Gallery of New South Wales indigenous art curator Hetti Perkins, put forward a recommendation for Nyadbi's work to be chosen to adorn the rooftop of the museum. Kathy Keele, the CEO of the Australia Council for the Arts, stated that the committee chose Nyadbi as her works struck a chord with the museum, as the building is shaped like a fish and is on the banks of the Seine.

The AU$500,000 commission, which was to be borne by the Council and Mitchell's philanthropic foundation, would see Nyadbi presenting a work entitled Dayiwul Lirlmim (Barramundi scales). The work tells the dreaming story of three women who trap a barramundi in a trap, but it escapes. The three women chase the fish across the countryside, and it jumps across a creek and lands on rocks. Scales from the fish are thereby scattered across the landscape on the current site of the Argyle Diamond Mine – the scales represent the diamonds which are mined in Nyadbi traditional lands. The painting which was done with ochre and charcoal from Nyadbi's traditional lands, was acquired by Harold Mitchell and loaned to the museum and put on long-term display.

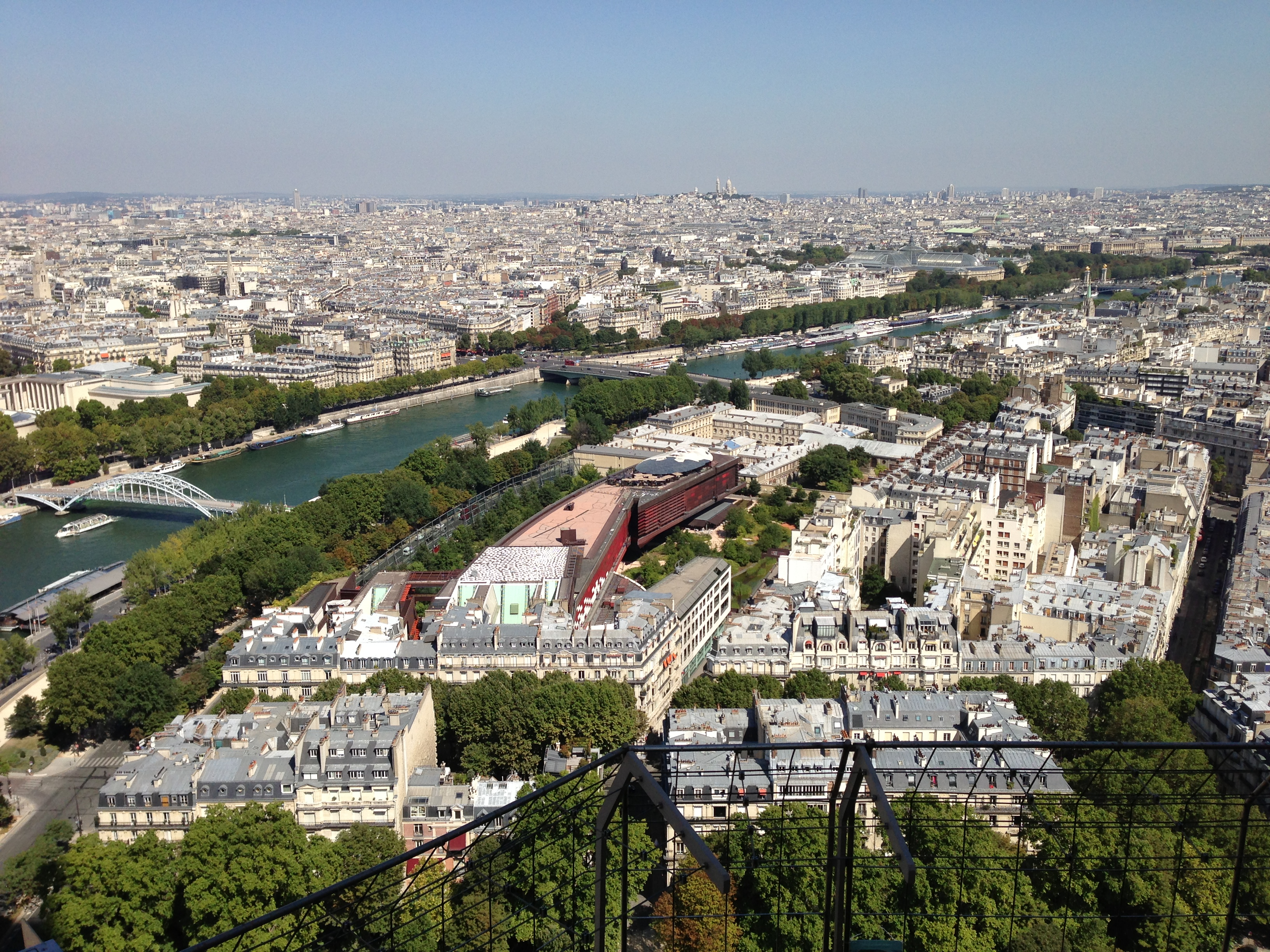
A view of the Seine and Musée du quai Branly from the Eiffel Tower. Visible on the rooftop of the museum is Nyadbi's work Dayiwul Lirlmim.

Preparation for the transformation of the artwork from canvas onto rooftop saw the original painting being digitised. This enabled the creation of 172 stencils which measured 3 metres by 1.5 metres to be created for placement on the roof of the museum. The black canvas was then painted with white rubber as is used on traffic signs in the French capital. The digitisation of the painting also allows for easy reproduction when it becomes necessary to replace the roofing tar every fifteen years.

On 2 June 2013, Australian Governor-General Quentin Bryce handed over custodianship of Dayiwul Lirlmim at a ceremony at the Musée du quai Branly. On the impending unveiling of the rooftop installation, Bryce said "I look forward to millions of visitors to this beautiful city glimpsing an epically scaled and awe-inspiring wonder from the Kimberley on the bank of the Seine." The installation was inaugurated on 6 June 2013, and saw Nyadbi and other dignitaries take a trip up the Eiffel Tower to view the work. Upon seeing her work on the rooftop Nyadbi shed tears, explaining that apart from feeling a great sense of excitement and pride it made her feel sorry for her traditional lands and whilst the diamond mine had destroyed the landscape of her country, the dreaming was still alive. Lee-Ann Buckskin, the chair of the Aboriginal and Torres Strait Islander Arts Board, shared the tears with Nyadbi and said that the Dayiwul Lirlmim installation would bring to the attention to the people who see it of what is one of the world's oldest cultures.

It made me sorry for my country, poor bugger. That fish, he is a long way from his country. He is next to a different river, but he is a long way from his country.

— Lena Nyadbi on her feelings upon seeing her painting on the roof of the museum for the first time.

Mitchell said the installation of the artwork on the rooftop of the museum would allow Australia to "show off our first peoples to the world," and further stated "(w)e must grab these opportunities where we can to tell the world who and what we are." Then-Federal Arts Minister, Tony Burke, stated that the installation signified the importance that is placed on the culture of indigenous Australia, and also held it up as an example of using art as a form of soft diplomacy.

== Awards and recognition ==
In May 2014 as part of the 2014 Western Australian of the Year Awards, Nyadbi was given the Aboriginal Award for "(e)xcellence in professional and/or personal achievements and contributions to the Western Australian community, and recognition as an inspirational role model of the Aboriginal community."

Nyadbi was appointed an Officer of the Order of Australia in the 2022 Australia Day Honours for "distinguished service to the visual arts as a contemporary Indigenous artist".

== Solo exhibitions ==
- Kintolai Gallery, Adelaide – 2000
- Niagara Galleries, Melbourne – 2000
- Niagara Galleries, Melbourne – 2005
- Niagara Galleries, Melbourne – 2007
- Painting my Country – Always, Niagara Galleries, Melbourne – 2010
- Niagara Galleries, Melbourne – 2012
- Starry Night, Niagara Galleries, Melbourne – 2016
