= Shirley Purdie =

Contemporary Indigenous Australian artist

- Born: 1947; Mabel Downs station, Kimberley region, Western Australia
- Known for: Painting
- Notable work: Stations of the Cross
- Awards: 2007 Blake Prize for Religious Art

Shirley Purdie (born 1947) is a contemporary Indigenous Australian artist, notable for winning the 2007 Blake Prize for Religious Art. She is a painter at Warmun Community, in Western Australia's Kimberley region.

== Life ==
Purdie was born in 1947 at Gilbun, or Mabel Downs Station, in Western Australia's Kimberley region, daughter of Madigan Thomas. She moved to Warmun, not far from her birthplace, where she lives and paints. She is married to artist Gordon Barney.

Her Ngarrangarni totem is a crow, and skin is Nangari.

== Art ==
Purdie was taught by her mother and by major Kimberley Indigenous artist Queenie McKenzie, two women who were among the first to paint at Warmun in the early 1980s. Her work Stations of the Cross was washed off the walls of the Warmun Art Centre in the catastrophic floods of March 2007, and when later recovered from beside the creek it was found to have been seriously damaged. The work portrays the Christian iconography of the 14 Stations of the Cross, but also the history of conflict and racial violence in the artist's community in the 1920s and 1930s.

== Awards ==
Purdie has won several awards, including the Blake Prize for Religious Art in 2007, for her work Stations of the Cross.

== Collections ==
Purdie's works are held by major galleries, including the Museum of Contemporary Art Australia, National Gallery of Australia, which has her 1996 lithograph, Giwiwan – Bow River Country. This print shows the influence of the painting style of major artist Rover Thomas.

== Books ==
- Shirley Purdie: My Story, Ngaginybe Jarragbe, Magabala, 2020 ISBN 9781925936131 – shortlisted for the Premier's Prize for an Emerging Writer at the 2020 Western Australian Premier's Book Awards and for the 2021 Children's Book of the Year Award for New Illustrator.
