= Danie Mellor =

Australian artist (born 1971)

- Born: 13 April 1971 (age 55); Mackay, Queensland, Australia
- Education: North Adelaide School of Art; Birmingham Institute of Art and Design; Australian National University
- Known for: Painting, printmaking, sculpture
- Notable work: From Rite to Ritual
- Movement: Urban indigenous art
- Awards: National Aboriginal & Torres Strait Islander Art Award 2009

Danie Mellor (born 13 April 1971) is an Australian artist who was the winner of 2009 National Aboriginal & Torres Strait Islander Art Award. Born in Mackay, Queensland, Mellor grew up in Scotland, Australia, and South Africa before undertaking tertiary studies at North Adelaide School of Art, the Australian National University (ANU) and Birmingham Institute of Art and Design. He then took up a post lecturing at Sydney College of the Arts. He works in different media including printmaking, drawing, painting, and sculpture. Considered a key figure in contemporary Indigenous Australian art, the dominant theme in Mellor's art is the relationship between Indigenous and non-Indigenous Australian cultures. (Note: With Mamu, Ngagen, and Ngajan heritage, Mellor self-identifies as Indigenous and is recognised by his community as such – to have a work accepted in the National Aboriginal & Torres Strait Islander Art Award one must both claim to be and be accepted as, an Indigenous Australian.)

Since 2000, Mellor's works have been included regularly in National Aboriginal & Torres Strait Islander Art Award exhibitions; in 2003 he was awarded a "highly commended", for his print Cyathea cooperi, and in 2009 he won the principal prize, for a mixed media work From Rite to Ritual. His other major exhibitions have included the Primavera 2005 show at the Museum of Contemporary Art, Sydney, and the inaugural National Indigenous Art Triennial (Culture Warriors) at the National Gallery of Australia in 2007. In 2012, his work was included in the National Museum of Australia's exhibition Menagerie: Contemporary Indigenous Sculpture as well as in the second National Indigenous Art Triennial, while international recognition came in 2013 with representation in the National Gallery of Canada's exhibition of international indigenous art.

== Life ==
Mellor was born in Mackay, Queensland, in 1971. His father was of American and Australian descent; his mother had Irish, Mamu, Ngagen, and Ngajan heritage. Mellor's maternal great-great-grandmother, Eleanor Kelly, and great-grandmother, May Kelly, were Indigenous Australian people from the rainforest country around Cairns. The family was peripatetic: in his first twenty years, Mellor lived in Mackay, Queensland; Scotland; Brisbane, Queensland; Sutton Grange, Victoria; Adelaide, South Australia; and Cape Town, South Africa, as well as in the Northern Territory. Mellor went to school at Steiner Schools in South Australia and South Africa; in high school he was taught art by his mother. Looking back at the influence of his schooling upon his art, he remarked how, despite the Eurocentric origins of Rudolf Steiner's approach to education, "there are comparable elements and themes inherent in [Steiner's] philosophical narrative that parallel an Indigenous outlook, which is holistic in the way it approaches deeper and more intuitive readings of the environment and landscape."

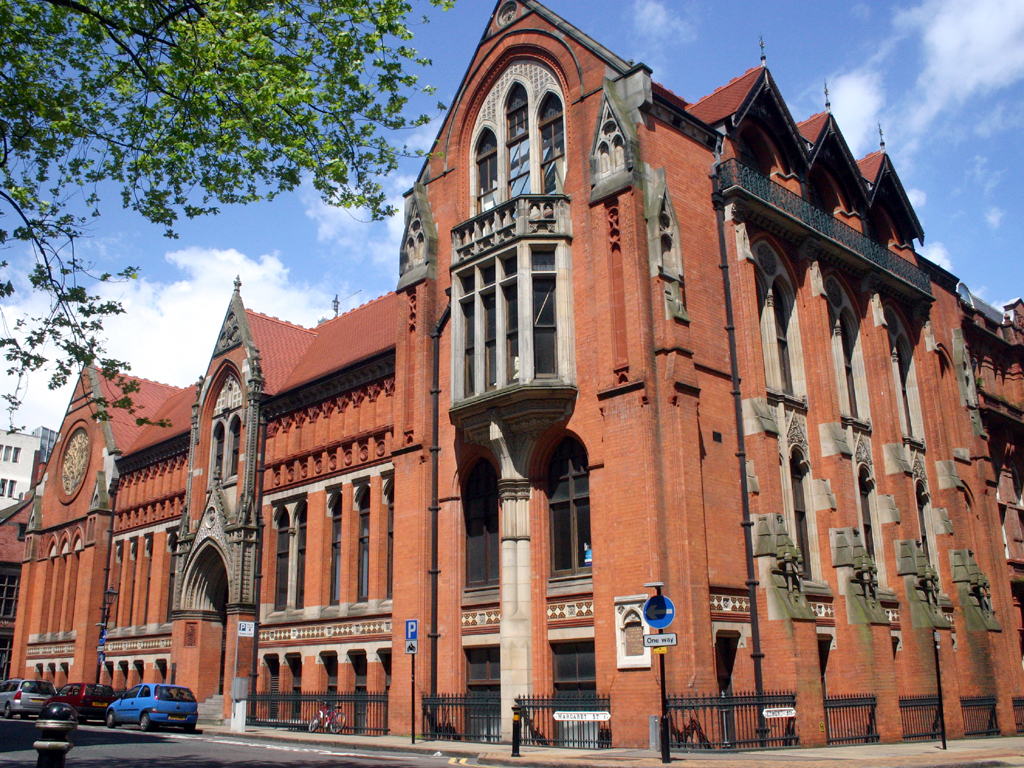
The Fine Art Department of Birmingham Institute of Art and Design, where Mellor completed his Masters

After completing a Certificate in Art at the North Adelaide School of Art in 1991, Mellor undertook a Bachelor of Arts with Honours at the ANU in 1992–1994, and a Masters in Fine Art at Birmingham Institute of Art and Design, part of the Birmingham City University, in 1995–1996. In the early 2000s, he entered a doctorate at the ANU, where he also taught print media and drawing. He completed his PhD in 2004. As of 2013, Mellor is a lecturer at Sydney College of the Arts, within the University of Sydney. Mellor is married to artist Joanne Kennedy.

== Career ==
In the early 1990s, Mellor won drawing prizes at the ANU's Canberra School of Art and the Grafton Regional Gallery in New South Wales. Through the mid-1990s, while studying in Canberra and Birmingham, he was represented in numerous student and other exhibitions, in Australia, Belgium, Japan, Korea and the United Kingdom. These included exhibitions titled Passage, at Kyoto Seika University in Japan in 1994, and Fragile Objects at the National Library of Australia in 1996.

Mellor's works have been included in the National Aboriginal & Torres Strait Islander Art Award on several occasions, in 2000, 2001, and every year from 2003 to 2010. In 2003, his mezzotint print Cyathea cooperi, (Note: Its title was misspelt as Cyanthea cooperi in the official catalogue of the exhibition, but correctly spelled elsewhere.) portraying tree ferns native to the Queensland rainforest, was highly commended. Subsequent entries have included Of fragile dreams the heart which nevermore in 2005, Untitled (Ernie Grant in Blackman Street) in 2006, Exotic lies and sacred ties (the heart that conceals, the tongue that never reveals) in 2008, and A Transcendent Vision (of life, death and resurrection) in 2010. Reviewing the 2008 exhibition, academic Sarah Scott expressed surprise that Mellor's 2008 piece had neither attracted an award nor been purchased for the Northern Territory's public collection.

Primavera 2005, an annual exhibition of young artists' work held at the Museum of Contemporary Art in Sydney, included Mellor's work Fig 1-100 (This particular collection made sense), a mixed media composition that included specimens of Ulysses butterflies. He has had numerous other exhibitions, both individually and as part of group shows, at galleries including the Queensland Art Gallery in 2003, the Canberra Museum and Art Gallery in 2006, and the Indigenous Ceramic Art Awards, at Shepparton Gallery in Victoria in 2007.

Mellor's work was represented in the first National Indigenous Art Triennial in 2007, with the elaborate (and elaborately named) sculpture The contrivance of a vintage Wonderland (A magnificent flight of curious fancy for science buffs, a china ark of seductive whimsy, a divinely ordered special attraction, upheld in multifariousness) featuring a diorama that included sculpted kangaroos made with blue and white crockery fragments (evoking Spode bone china), real kangaroo skin (used for the ears and paws), and synthetic eyeballs; stuffed birds sat in a life-sized mixed-media tree overhead. The work featured in media reports of the exhibition, including by The Adelaide Advertiser, The Canberra Times, The West Australian and the Australian Broadcasting Corporation.

Since graduating, Mellor has won several awards, including the Canberra Critic's Choice Award in 2006, and the $15,000 John Tallis National Works on Paper Acquisitive Award in 2008. The following year, he won the Victorian Indigenous Ceramic Art Award, held at Shepparton Art Gallery in Shepparton, Victoria. In August 2009, Mellor won the AU$40,000 National Aboriginal & Torres Strait Islander Art Award, for his mixed media work From Rite to Ritual. It was only the third time in the award's 26 years that an urban Aboriginal artist had been the winner. Earlier that year his solo show at Brisbane's Jan Murphy Gallery had sold out. Also in that year, Mellor's work was featured alongside that of Patricia Piccinini and Cherry Hood in the Newcastle Region Art Gallery's show Animal Attraction. Though Mellor has not had a painting hung in the Archibald Prize, he was the subject of Paul Ryan's portrait that was a 2010 finalist in that competition. In 2012, his work was included in the National Museum of Australia's exhibition Menagerie: Contemporary Indigenous Sculpture, and in the second National Indigenous Art Triennial. He was also selected for inclusion in that year's Blake Prize, with his work Bulluru Storywater. Mellor received international recognition in 2013, when he was included in Sakahàn, the National Gallery of Canada's "most ambitious contemporary art exhibition in its history".

Among the national collections containing Mellor's work are the National Gallery of Australia, which owns his prize-winning From Rite to Ritual, and the Parliament House Art Collection. Most other major Australian art collections have holdings, including the state gallery of his birth state, Queensland, and the main public gallery of the city where he completed much of his tertiary study, the Canberra Museum and Gallery. Other state and territory galleries in which he is represented include the Art Gallery of South Australia, the Museum and Art Gallery of the Northern Territory and the National Gallery of Victoria. Public regional galleries that have collected Mellor's creations include Newcastle Regional Art Gallery in New South Wales, and Warrnambool Art Gallery in Victoria. He is also represented in the Australian government's collection, Artbank, as well as in large, private collections such as the Kerry Stokes.

In the 2010s, Mellor became involved in administrative and leadership roles in the arts community. In 2010, he became a member of the Visual Arts Board of the Australia Council for the Arts. In 2011, Mellor was not an entrant in the National Aboriginal & Torres Strait Islander Art Award, as he instead became one of its judges. Appointed to the Visual Arts Board for a further term, Mellor in 2013 became its Chair. At the same time, Mellor continued to exhibit works. In 2014, a survey of his works opened at the University of Queensland Art Museum and was scheduled to travel to the Museum and Art Gallery of the Northern Territory later in the year. The exhibition was favourably reviewed in theguardian.com, with art critic Sharne Wolff drawing attention to Mellor's newest sculpture, Anima, which she said "marks a dramatic change" for the artist, bearing "no resemblance to Mellor's more glamorous output". His work featured as part of the Edinburgh International Festival, with a show titled Primordial: SuperNaturalBayiMinyjirral displayed at the National Museum of Scotland.

A large work of Mellor's, Entelekheia (2016), consisting of photographic images of plants etched in concrete, can be found on the exterior walls of the International Convention Centre in Sydney.

== Technique and themes ==
Mellor's From Rite to Ritual (2009)

Mellor's extensive scholarly art education has made his art have a strong theoretical base. In interviews he has acknowledged the influence of diverse artists, including Indigenous painter Rover Thomas, Australian Sulman Prize winner Tim Storrier, Romantic painters including Germany's Caspar David Friedrich, and contemporary German artists Joseph Beuys, and Beuys' student Anselm Kiefer. He has harnessed a wide range of media during his career, including printmaking, drawing, painting and sculpture utilising wood, glass, steel and ceramics, as well as a range of more unorthodox materials, as his 2007 Indigenous Art Triennial entry demonstrated. Reflecting on that sculpture, Artlink Magazine's reviewer, Daniel Thomas, remarked on how the work signified "how colonisers always get things wrong; how Europeans looking for China, and its fine porcelain manufactures, stumbled instead upon the land of the kangaroo, and traded and planted ideas of racial and cultural superiority".

When Sarah Scott considered the 2008 work Exotic Lies and Sacred Ties, which, like From Rite to Ritual, drew on evocations of Spode china, she highlighted its exploration of the history of cross-cultural relations. Noting the landscape that forms the central element of the painting, she observed:

The stuffed parrot and upside-down cockatoo that hangs above the landscape recall the bizarre renditions of these birds produced by European artists following the eighteenth-century European voyages of discovery to Australia. In front of the 'landscape' are two mosaic kangaroo 'messengers.' One kangaroo points to the painting. Another covers his ears in a 'hear no evil' gesture, graphically signifying how under the black armband view of history ..., the oral history accounts of Indigenous people have been largely ignored. This work recalls the museum dioramas in which Aboriginal people, who until 1967 were classified under the Flora and Fauna act, appeared amongst exotic taxidermy objects.

From Rite to Ritual examined relationships between Indigenous and settler cultures, including differences in spiritual practices. Mellor, in an artist's statement for the awards, described the work as showing "what is a moment of contact, a conversation and interaction between two cultures; it speaks of the challenges of settlement, and the differences in spiritual enactment and belief". Commenting on the work, the judges of the prize remarked that the "surprising scale and layering of imagery, with its understated political and historical references" made the work "outstanding" and of "great complexity and grace". Art writer Nicolas Rothwell described the work as drawing a parallel "between Aboriginal initiation rituals and the ceremonies inside a Masonic lodge."

[It] takes a deeper look at, you might say, a ceremonial narrative ... In any society, there are layers of revelation and things that are perhaps hidden or kept from sight.

— Danie Mellor, 2010 interview, speaking of one of his 2010 artworks that draw on Freemasonry.

Mellor's earlier works examined the relationships between cultures, including in his mezzotint prints in which he juxtaposed "images of native and introduced flora and fauna—for example, a kangaroo with a bull—to symbolise two different peoples and cultures". These issues were also addressed in his painting for the exhibition Native Titled Now, shown in South Australia in 1996. Mellor's interest in cultural interactions extends beyond the making of his art. In a panel discussion on Indigenous art education, Mellor emphasised that, in teaching Indigenous art within visual arts, it was important to be aware of both Aboriginal and settler history, "so you can talk about their interaction and the whole set of issues that arise from those two things being parallel". Mellor's emphasis on past interactions between cultures led gallerist and critic Michael Reid to consider that Mellor's works had earned him "an important place in the visual narrative of Australian history".

For Mellor, Indigenous identity is a theme highlighted in his work and (not necessarily by his own choice) in public life. As a fair-skinned man with blue eyes and caucasian features, his appearance has occasionally raised questions of "authenticity". Mellor found himself the target of columnist Andrew Bolt, who took issue with Mellor entering and winning the 2009 National Aboriginal & Torres Strait Islander Art Award. Bolt wrote "This white university lecturer, with his nice Canberra studio, has by winning pushed aside real draw-in-the-dirt Aboriginal artists such as Dorothy Napangardi, Mitjili Napanangka Gibson and Walangkura Napanangka, who had also entered and could really have used that cash and recognition." Commentator Ellie Savage, criticising Bolt, wondered why someone who "neither draws in the dirt nor lives in it" should therefore have "no right to enter competitions for Indigenous artists". Bolt two years later lost a case brought by nine Indigenous Australians—not including Mellor—for racial discrimination over articles that criticised fair-skinned Indigenous people, including the post that had lambasted Mellor. Art writer Maurice O'Riordan, reviewing the 2009 Award, noted the Bolt controversy but pointed out that Mellor, while in early works acknowledging his Indigenous heritage, is not concerned with the definition of Aboriginality, but with historical interaction between cultures and the reimagining of history.
