= Wilson River (Western Australia) =

River in Kimberley region of Western Australia

Coordinates: 16°47′40″S 128°16′30″E

Location
- Country: Australia

Physical characteristics
- Source
  - elevation: 507 metres (1,663 ft)
- Mouth
  - location: Bow River
  - elevation: 158 metres (518 ft)
- Length: 146 kilometres (91 mi)

The Wilson River is a river in the Kimberley region of Western Australia.

The headwaters of the river rise in the Durack Range below Kangaroo Hill and near Bedford Downs, then flow north-east. The river flows past Nellie Range, through Devils Elbow and Gordons Gorge and through the O'Donnell Range. The river then changes direction to the southeast and discharges into the Bow River approximately 25 kilometres (16 mi) north of Warmun adjacent to the Great Northern Highway.

The traditional owners of the area are the Kitja people.
