= Bronwyn Bancroft =

Australian artist (born 1958)

Bronwyn Bancroft AM
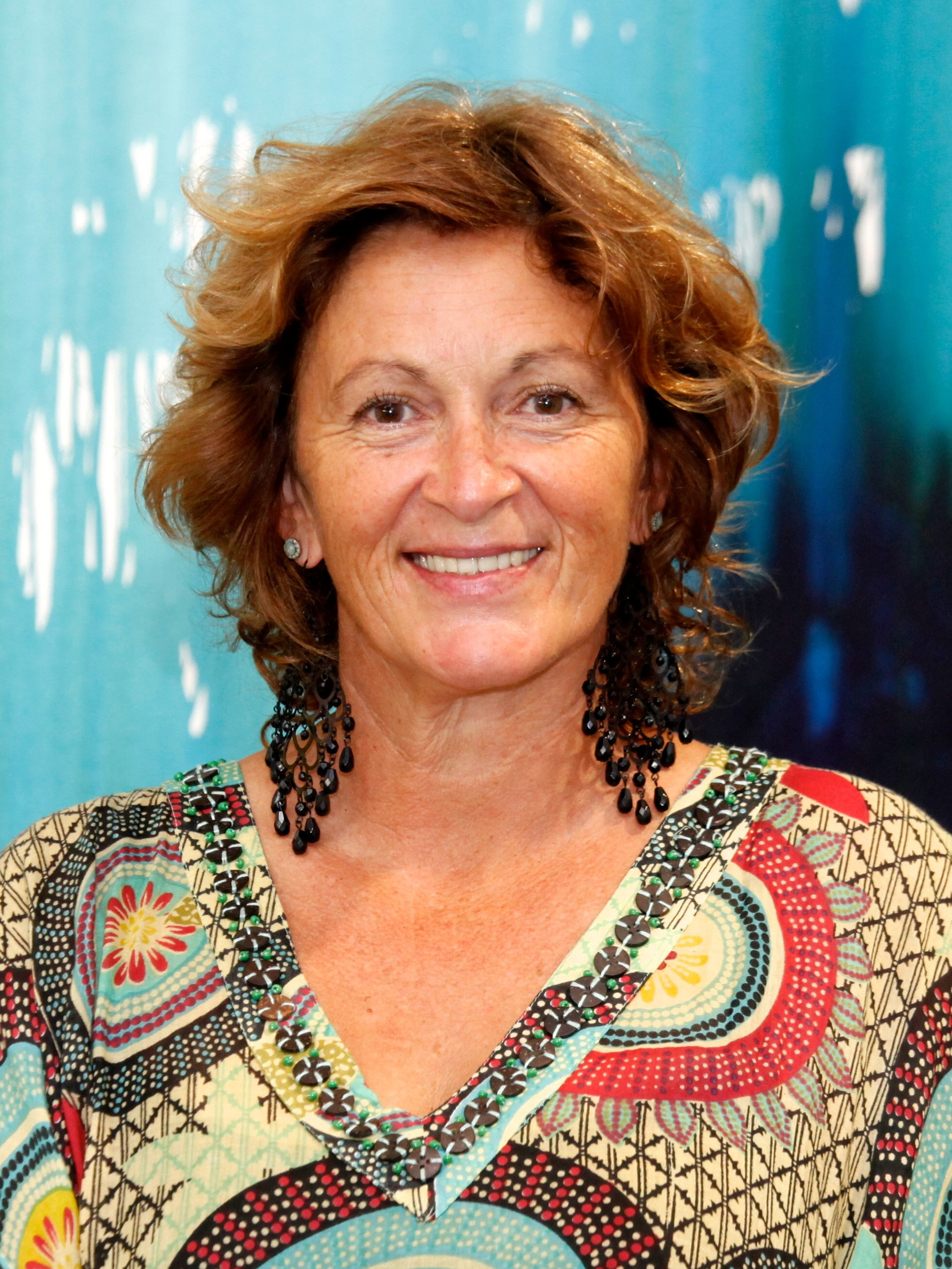
- Bancroft in 2011
- Born: 1958 (age 67–68); Tenterfield, New South Wales, Australia
- Notable work: Prevention of AIDS (1992); Tempe Reserve sports centre (2004)

Bronwyn Bancroft AM (born 1958) is an Aboriginal Australian (Bundjalung) artist, administrator, book illustrator, and among the first three Australian fashion designers to show their work in Paris. She was born in Tenterfield, New South Wales, and trained in Canberra and Sydney.

In 1985, Bancroft established a shop called Designer Aboriginals, selling fabrics made by Aboriginal artists, including herself. She was a founding member of Boomalli Aboriginal Artists Co-operative. Her artwork is held by the National Gallery of Australia, the Art Gallery of New South Wales and the Art Gallery of Western Australia. She illustrated and written 47; children's books, including Stradbroke Dreamtime by activist Oodgeroo Noonuccal, and books by artist Sally Morgan. Her design commissions include one for the exterior of a Sydney sports centre.

Bancroft has a long history of involvement in community activism and arts administration, and has served as a board member for the National Gallery of Australia. Her painting Prevention of AIDS (1992) was used in a campaign to raise awareness of HIV/AIDS in Australia. She served on the boards of copyright collection agency Viscopy, the Australian Society of Authors and Tranby Aboriginal College, and the Artists Board at the Museum of Contemporary Art Australia (MCA) in Sydney.

== Early life ==
A Bundjalung woman, Bancroft was born in Tenterfield, a town in rural New South Wales, in 1958. She was the youngest of seven children of Owen Cecil Joseph Bancroft, known as "Bill"—an Aboriginal Australian from the Djanbun clan—and Dot, who is of Scottish and Polish ancestry. Bancroft has said that her great-great-great-grandmother Pemau was one of only two or three survivors from her clan, the rest murdered when their land was settled by a white farmer. Her grandfather and uncle worked in local goldmines. She recalled that her father's education was obstructed by discrimination because he was Aboriginal. His lack of formal training meant that he had to work away from home cutting railway sleepers, while her mother worked at home as a dressmaker. Bancroft's father was an engineer during World War II, managing barges at Madang and Rabaul.

Following her father's advice on the importance of getting an education or a trade, Bancroft completed high school in Tenterfield before moving to Canberra in 1976 with her husband-to-be Ned Manning, who had also been her teacher. There Bancroft completed a Diploma of Visual Communications through the Canberra School of Art, followed by a Master of Studio Practice and a Master of Visual Arts (Paintings) at the University of Sydney. She never returned to live in Tenterfield, although her three sisters were living there in 2004. Her father died around 1990. Bancroft has three children: Jack was born in 1985, Ella in 1988. She separated from Manning when they were very young; her third child Rubyrose was born in 1999. Jack was awarded NSW Young Australian of the Year in 2010 for his work arranging the mentoring of Indigenous school students.

== Career ==
=== Art and design ===
Bancroft was a founding member of the Boomalli Aboriginal Artists Co-operative, one of Australia's oldest Indigenous-run artists' organisations, established in 1987. She served in the roles of chairperson, director, and treasurer during its first two decades. In 1985, she opened a shop in Sydney called Designer Aboriginals, selling the work of designers including her own fabrics, and staffed by her Indigenous female students. Bancroft, Euphemia Bostock and Mini Heath were the first Australian fashion designers invited to show their works in Paris, where Bancroft's painted designs on cloth were exhibited at the 1987 Printemps Fashion Parade. Two years later, in 1989, she contributed to a London exhibition, Australian Fashion: The Contemporary Art. Despite these successes, she moved away from the fashion industry, telling an interviewer in 2005 that she had not done fabric design for 15 years. Described as "an instinctive colourist", Bancroft has since worked primarily as a painter, and has developed "a glowing style reminiscent of stained glass windows". She has cited as influences the American painter Georgia O'Keeffe, European painters Joan Miró, Wassily Kandinsky, and Marc Chagall, and Australian Indigenous artists such as Emily Kngwarreye, Rover Thomas, and Mary MacLean.

Although initially known as a fabric and textile designer, Bancroft has worked with many artistic media, including "jewellery design, painting, collage, illustration, sculpture and interior decoration". Art works by Bancroft are held by the National Gallery of Australia, the Art Gallery of New South Wales, the Art Gallery of Western Australia and the Queensland Art Gallery. The National Gallery holds one of her screenprints, Entrapped, created in 1991. Between 1989 and 2006, Bancroft held eight solo exhibitions and participated in at least 53 group exhibitions, including shows at the Australian Museum in Sydney, the National Gallery of Australia in Canberra, and the National Gallery of Victoria. Her art has been exhibited in Indonesia, New Zealand, the US, France and Germany.

In 2004, Bancroft was commissioned to design a large mural covering the exterior of a sports centre housing two basketball courts at Tempe Reserve in Marrickville, New South Wales. The mural depicts a snake, a man, and a woman, representing both biblical and Indigenous Australian creation stories. It also includes the goanna, the ancestral totem of the Marrickville area's original inhabitants, the Wangal people.

Bancroft ventured into illustrating children's books in 1993, when she provided the artwork for Fat and Juicy Place written by Dianna Kidd. The book was shortlisted for the Children's Book Council of Australia's Book of the Year and won the Australian Multicultural Children's Book Award. In the same year, she illustrated Stradbroke Dreamtime by Indigenous activist and writer Oodgeroo Noonuccal. She was the third artist to have provided images for successive editions of the book, of which the first edition was released in 1972. Bancroft has since contributed artwork for over 20 children's books, including some by prominent Australian writer and artist Sally Morgan, whom she regards as a mentor and friend. These books include Dan's grandpa (1996) and Sam's bush journey (2009). The two artists collaborated on an exhibition of prints at Warrnambool Art Gallery in Victoria in 1991. Researcher and museum curator Margo Neale has described the art of both Bancroft and Morgan as depicting "their relationship to country and family in generally high-keyed works, celebrating and commemorating through personal or collective stories in mainly figurative narratives."

As well as working with established writers, Bancroft has created a number of children's books in her own right, including An Australian 1 2 3 of Animals and An Australian ABC of Animals, which have been favourably reviewed as imaginative and well-illustrated. Her style of illustration has been described as "bold and mysterious", and as "traditional Australian Aboriginal representation rendered in bright, eye-catching colors." In 2009 Bancroft received the Dromkeen Medal for her contribution to children's literature. In May 2010, the Governor-General of Australia Quentin Bryce launched Bancroft's latest book, Why I Love Australia. A long-time supporter of Bancroft's work, Ms Bryce said: "Why I love Australia is a work and title that, again, speaks volumes of its author and illustrator. It simply and exquisitely rejoices in telling a story of this magnificent, sacred land we share: the mountains, rivers and gorges; seas and coral reefs; grasslands and bushlands; saltpans and snow; houses and streets; the jeweled night sky, and so much more."

Bancroft's art has also appeared in the publications of a number of other individuals and organisations, including as cover art for books from the Australian Museum and the New South Wales Education Department, for Larissa Behrendt's novel Home, and for Roberta Sykes's controversial autobiographical narratives Snake Cradle and Snake Dancing, among others.

=== Administration and activism ===
Bancroft has been active in arts organisations, and served two terms on the board of the National Gallery of Australia during the 1990s. She was chair of the Visual Arts Board of the New South Wales Ministry for the Arts, and of the National Indigenous Arts Advocacy Organisation from 1993 to 1996. In the lead-up to the 2000 Summer Olympics in Sydney, Bancroft was a member of the design committee that advised on the development of the games' official logo, and has acted as a judge for the $35,000 Country Energy Art Prize. Bancroft was a member of the board of directors of the Australian copyright collection agency, Viscopy, and while serving in that position has been an advocate of resale royalty rights for artists. She has observed that "resale royalties are an intrinsic link to the improvement of the inherent rights of Australian artists to a fair income". She was a member of the Museum of Contemporary Art Australia's Artist Advisory Group in 2005, and is a member of the museum's artists board. She has served on the board of the Indigenous training organisation, Tranby Aboriginal College.

Within and beyond her artistic works, Bancroft has demonstrated concern for a range of social issues, particularly those affecting Indigenous Australians. Her painting Prevention of AIDS (1992) was reproduced on posters and postcards aimed at raising awareness of HIV/AIDS, and was one of several of her images commissioned by the federal Department of Health to highlight issues regarding the disease in the Indigenous community. In 2000, two years after the death of activist Mum (Shirl) Smith, Bancroft and the Boomalli Aboriginal Artists Co-operative organised a fund-raising exhibition of art works in Smith's honour.

As of 2009, Bancroft was a director of the Australian Indigenous Mentoring Experience, a not-for-profit organisation that aims to increase senior high school and university admission rates for Indigenous students. She has taught and mentored Indigenous school students such as Jessica Birk, a winner of the Australia Council's inaugural Emerging and Young Artist Award in May 2009.

In 2021, Bancroft was inaugural recipient of the A$30,000 NSW Aboriginal Creative Fellowship.

Since February 2023, she has served as a board member of the Australian Society of Authors.

Bancroft was appointed a Member of the Order of Australia in the 2024 King's Birthday Honours for "significant service to the arts, and to the Indigenous community".

She was awarded the 2024 Lady Cutler Award for her "distinguished service to children's literature" with a particular focus on Aboriginal children's literature. She received a Red Ochre Award for Lifetime Achievement in Artistic Excellence in 2026.

== Selected published works ==
- Walking the boundaries (illustrator), Angus & Robertson, 1993, ISBN 0-207-17796-1
- Stradbroke dreamtime (illustrator), Angus & Robertson, 1993, ISBN 0-207-17938-7
- Dirrangun (illustrator), Angus & Robertson, 1994, ISBN 0-207-18482-8
- Dan's Grandpa (illustrator), Fremantle Press, 1996, ISBN 1-86368-159-0
- Leaving (illustrator), Roland Harvey, 2000, ISBN 0-949714-75-5
- The Outback (illustrator), with Annaliese Porter, Magabala Books, 2005, ISBN 1-875641-86-6
- An Australian ABC of Animals, Little Hare Books, 2005, ISBN 1-877003-97-2
- Ready to Dream (illustrator), Bloomsbury, 2008, ISBN 978-1-59990-049-0
- An Australian 1, 2, 3 of animals, Little Hare Books, 2009, ISBN 978-1-921541-11-7
- W is for wombat: my first Australian word book, Little Hare Books, 2009, ISBN 978-1-921541-17-9
- Why I love Australia, Little Hare Books, 2010, ISBN 978-1-921541-78-0
- Colours of Australia, Hardie Grant Egmont, 2016, ISBN 978-1-742976-91-4742976914
- Shapes of Australia, Little Hare Books, 2017, ISBN 978-1-760129-28-6
- Clever crow = Wäk L̲iya-Djambatj, Magabala Books, 2018, ISBN 978-1-922142-61-0
- 1, 2, 3 of Australian animals, Little Hare Books, 2019, ISBN 978-1-921272-85-1
- Coming Home to Country, Little Hare Books, 2020, ISBN 978-1-760501-92-1

== Major collections ==
- Artbank
- Art Gallery of New South Wales
- State Library of New South Wales
- Art Gallery of Western Australia
- Australian Museum
- Department of the Prime Minister and Cabinet (Australia)
- National Gallery of Australia
- National Museum of Australia
- New York Public Library Print Collection
- Newark Museum
- Parliament House Art Collection
- Queensland Art Gallery

== See also ==
- Contemporary Indigenous Australian art
