= Paddy Nyunkuny Bedford =

Australian artist (1922–2007)

- Born: c.1920/1922 Bedford Downs, East Kimberley, Western Australia, Australia
- Died: 14 July 2007; East Kimberley, Western Australia
- Other names: Kuwumji, Nyunkuny, Guwumji
- Known for: Painting, contemporary Indigenous Australian art

Paddy Nyunkuny Bedford (circa 1920/1922 – 14 July 2007), aka Goowoomji, was a contemporary Aboriginal Australian painter and printmaker from Warmun in the Kimberley in Western Australia. He was one of eight Australian artists selected for an architectural commission for the roof and ceilings of the Musée du quai Branly in Paris, France.

== Early life and education ==
Paddy Nyunkuny Bedford was born in the East Kimberley around 1920 or 1922 at a property which gave him his surname – Bedford Downs Station. He grew up on Bedford Downs Station and worked as a stockman and road builder for the Western Australian Main Roads Department. The station's owner Paddy Quilty was the source of Bedford's given name, but Bedford's judgement of Quilty was at best forgiving, and could be harsh. Quilty was reputed to have been involved in a massacre of Indigenous people in the region before Bedford's birth, and Bedford's response to an invitation to visit Quilty's grave was "Why should I go see that old fucking bastard?". In Bedford, he was heavily involved in traditional Gija law and ceremony, and became a senior lawman.

Life for Bedford, like his parents, was hard and shaped by the harsh racial politics of early 20th century Australia. Bedford left Bedford Downs in the early 1970's as a result of the 1969 Pastoral Award legislation that resulted in the eviction of many Aboriginal workers. His parents survived but were displaced by incidents that involved the killing of Indigenous people. Many Gija people have recorded stories and painted as a means to explain massacres that occurred in their country. Bedford was at one stage sent to a leprosarium, despite not having leprosy. When he married Emily Watson and had children, the children were taken away to a mission.

Bedford, like many of the Indigenous men in the Kimberley, worked as a stockman, but was paid in rations. When the law in 1969 required equal pay for black and white alike, station owners responded by laying off their indigenous workforce, including Bedford. He worked for a while on road building, but ended up forced on to welfare by injury.

== Art practice and career ==
Bedford was familiar with body-painting as a young man. He commenced painting on canvas in around 1997 or 1998, together with other artists from the Warmun / Turkey Creek locality, and encouraged by former gallerist Tony Oliver.

Bedford's painting is loosely representational of landscape, and was influenced by the work of Rover Thomas. Although strongly influenced by traditional techniques and iconography from The Dreaming, it also addresses black-white relationships and historical events in his country. He painted a series illustrating the poisoning murders of Gija men on Bedford Downs in the 1910s. Bedford's homeland is featured in several of his works, with Old Bedford (2005) being a popular example. Bedford's work is unlike other Aboriginal work in that it features bolder, more vibrant colors. For examples, his pieces Doowoonan (2005) and Mount King (2005) both feature ambiguous, bright red and blue figures that rest on a black background. Bedford also explores a wide range of mediums, including ochre pigments with acrylic binder on canvas and board, as well as gouaches and pastels on paper.

Bedford retired at Turkey Creek—a Warmun Aboriginal community established in the beginning of the 1970s that sought to provide shelter for workers that had been displaced due to the change in employment conditions. He began painting for exhibition after the establishment of the Jirrawun Aboriginal Art group at Rugun, a small community 50 km (31 mi) north of Warmun, in 1998 by Freddie Timms and Tony Oliver. Bedford was one several artists who owned Jirrawun Arts, a company established to assist the development and sale of works by indigenous artists from parts of the Kimberley. Following the death of Bedford, the remaining owners decided to wind up the business and sell its assets.

Some notable works include Joowarringayin-Devil Dreaming, Thoowoonggonarrin, Mt King - Emu Dreaming, Lightning Creek, and Cockatoo - Jawoorraban.

== Death and legacy ==
Bedford died on 14 July 2007.

His art remains among Australia's most collectible, and has decorated aircraft as part of Qantas' Indigenous Flying Art series.

== Collections and exhibitions ==
Bedford was one of eight Australian artists selected for an architectural commission for the Musée du quai Branly, Paris, which opened in 2006. Their work adorns the roof and ceilings of one of its buildings.

In addition to a number of solo exhibitions, his work was included in major group exhibitions such as Blood on the spinifex at the Ian Potter Museum of Art (2002–2003) and True Stories at the Art Gallery of New South Wales (2003). A major retrospective exhibition of his work at the Museum of Contemporary Art Australia was curated by Russell Storer in 2007.

His work is represented in numerous major Australian and international collections, including the National Gallery of Australia, National Gallery of Victoria, Art Gallery of New South Wales, Art Gallery of Western Australia and the Musée du quai Branly.
