= Phyllis Thomas =

Australian painter (1940–2018)

- Born: 1940
- Died: 2018 (aged 77–78)

Phyllis Thomas (1940–2018) was an Australian painter.

== Biography ==
Thomas was born in 1933 or 1940. Her painting was influenced by the work of Queenie McKenzie. Her work was included in the 2016 exhibition Telling Tales at the Museum of Contemporary Art Australia. She died in 2018.

Her work is in the collection of the Art Gallery of New South Wales, the Auckland Art Gallery, and the National Gallery of Victoria.
