= Contemporary Indigenous Australian art =

Modern art work produced by Aboriginal Australians and Torres Strait Islander people

Contemporary Indigenous Australian art is the modern art work produced by Indigenous Australians, that is, Aboriginal Australians and Torres Strait Islander people. It is generally regarded as beginning in 1971 with a painting movement that started at Papunya, northwest of Alice Springs, Northern Territory, involving Aboriginal artists such as Clifford Possum Tjapaltjarri and Kaapa Tjampitjinpa, and facilitated by white Australian teacher and art worker Geoffrey Bardon. The movement spawned widespread interest across rural and remote Aboriginal Australia in creating art, while contemporary Indigenous art of a different nature also emerged in urban centres; together they have become central to Australian art. Indigenous art centres have fostered the emergence of the contemporary art movement, and as of 2010 were estimated to represent over 5000 artists, mostly in Australia's north and west.

Contemporary Indigenous artists have won many of Australia's most prominent art prizes. The Wynne Prize has been won by Indigenous artists on at least three occasions, the Blake Prize for Religious Art was in 2007 won by Shirley Purdie with Linda Syddick Napaltjarri a finalist on three occasions, while the Clemenger Contemporary Art Award was won by John Mawurndjul in 2003 and Judy Watson in 2006. There is a national art prize for Indigenous artists, the National Aboriginal & Torres Strait Islander Art Award, which in 2013 was won by Jenni Kemarre Martiniello from Canberra.

Indigenous artists, including Rover Thomas, have represented Australia at the Venice Biennale in 1990 and 1997. In 2007, a painting by Emily Kngwarreye, Earth's Creation, was the first Indigenous Australian art work to sell for more than A$1 million. Leading Indigenous artists have had solo exhibitions at Australian and international galleries, while their work has been included in major collaborations such as the design of the Musée du quai Branly. Works by contemporary Indigenous artists are held by all of Australia's major public galleries, including the National Gallery of Australia, which in 2010 opened a new wing dedicated to its Indigenous collection.

The figurative "dot painting" produced by Western Desert artists is among the most well-known styles of contemporary Aboriginal art.

== Origins and evolution ==
Aboriginal Australian art can claim to be "the world's longest continuing art tradition". Prior to European settlement of Australia, Indigenous people used many art forms, including sculpture, wood carving, rock carving, body painting, bark painting, and weaving. Many of these continue to be used both for traditional purposes and in the creation of art works for exhibition and sale. Some other techniques have declined or disappeared since European settlement, including body decoration by scarring and the making of possum-skin cloaks. However, Indigenous Australians also adopted and expanded the use of new techniques including painting on paper and canvas. Early examples include the late nineteenth century drawings by William Barak.

=== Early initiatives ===
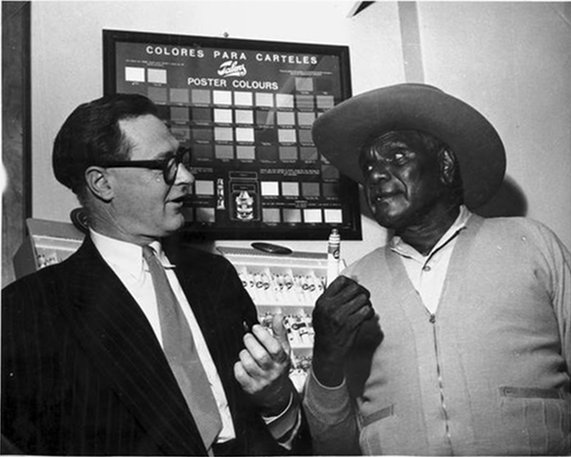
Albert Namatjira, right, with portraitist William Dargie

In the 1930s, artists Rex Battarbee and John Gardner introduced watercolour painting to Albert Namatjira, an Indigenous man at Hermannsberg Mission, south-west of Alice Springs. His landscape paintings, first created in 1936 and exhibited in Australian cities in 1938, were immediately successful, and he became the first Indigenous Australian watercolourist as well as the first to successfully exhibit and sell his works to the non-Indigenous community. Namatjira's style of work was adopted by other Indigenous artists in the region beginning with his close male relatives, and they became known as the Hermannsburg School or as the Arrernte Watercolourists.

Namatjira died in 1959, and by then a second initiative had also begun. At Ernabella, now Pukatja, South Australia, the use of bright acrylic paints to produce designs for posters and postcards was introduced. This led later to fabric design and batik work, which is still produced at Australia's oldest Indigenous art centre.

=== Papunya Tula ===
While the initiatives at Hermannsburg and Ernabella were important antecedents, most sources trace the origins of contemporary Indigenous art, particularly acrylic painting, to Papunya, Northern Territory, in 1971. An Australian school teacher, Geoffrey Bardon arrived at Papunya and started an art program with children at the school and then with the men of the community. The men began with painting a mural on the school walls, and moved on to painting on boards and canvas. At the same time, Kaapa Tjampitjinpa, a member of the community who worked with Bardon, won a regional art award at Alice Springs with his painting Gulgardi. Soon over 20 men at Papunya were painting, and they established their own company, Papunya Tula Artists Limited, to support the creation and marketing of works. Although painting took hold quickly at Papunya, it remained a "small-scale regional phenomenon" throughout the 1970s, and for a decade none of the state galleries or the national gallery collected the works, with the notable exception of the Museum and Art Gallery of the Northern Territory, that acquired 226 of the early Papunya boards.

=== Evolution ===
After being largely confined to Papunya in the 1970s, the painting movement developed rapidly in the 1980s, spreading to Yuendumu, Lajamanu, Utopia and Haasts Bluff in the Northern Territory, and Balgo, Western Australia. By the 1990s artistic activity had spread to many communities throughout northern Australia, including those established as part of the Outstation movement, such as Kintore, Northern Territory and Kiwirrkurra Community, Western Australia. As the movement evolved, not all artists were satisfied with its trajectory. What began as a contemporary expression of ritual knowledge and identity was increasingly becoming commodified, as the economic success of painting created its own pressures within communities. Some artists were critical of the art centre workers, and moved away from painting, returning their attention to ritual. Other artists were producing works less connected to social networks that had been traditionally responsible for designs. While the movement was evolving, however, its growth did not slow: at least another 10 painting communities developed in central Australia between the late 1990s and 2006.

Writing of the changing attitudes to Indigenous Australian art in a 2002 memoir, British businessman Alistair McAlpine (1942–2014) noted:

One of the great changes in Australia as a whole is the art world's attitude to Aboriginal painting and sculpture–people love it, where once they ignored it entirely. Aboriginal paintings now fetch hundreds of thousands of dollars. There was recently one small hitch when one Aboriginal artist won a $50,000 art prize. 'Now I can afford to give up painting,' she announced to the assembled press–she was, however, quickly corrected, and the statement adjusted to 'Now I have the freedom to paint.'

Indigenous art cooperatives have been central to the emergence of contemporary Indigenous art. Whereas many western artists pursue formal training and work as individuals, most contemporary Indigenous art is created in community groups and art centres. The number of people involved, and the small sizes of the places in which they work, mean that sometimes a quarter to a half of community members are artists, with critic Sasha Grishin concluding in 2007 that the communities include "the highest per capita concentrations of artists anywhere in the world".

In 2025, the peak body representing Central Desert Australian Indigenous art centres, Desart (incorporated in 1993), had 39 member centres. It mounts the Desert Mob exhibition and event at the Araluen Arts Centre in Mparntwe (Alice Springs) each year.

The Association of Northern, Kimberley and Arnhem Aboriginal Artists (ANKAAA; now Arnhem, Northern and Kimberley Artists, or ANKA), the peak body for northern Australian communities, had almost 50 member centres in 2025. The centres represent large numbers of artists – ANKAA estimated that in its member organisations included up to 5000 that year.

The Aboriginal Art Association of Australia (AAAA), incorporated in January 1999, advocates for all industry participants, including artists, galleries, and dealers. It lobbies and informs governments on behalf of its members on a range of matters.

== Styles and themes ==
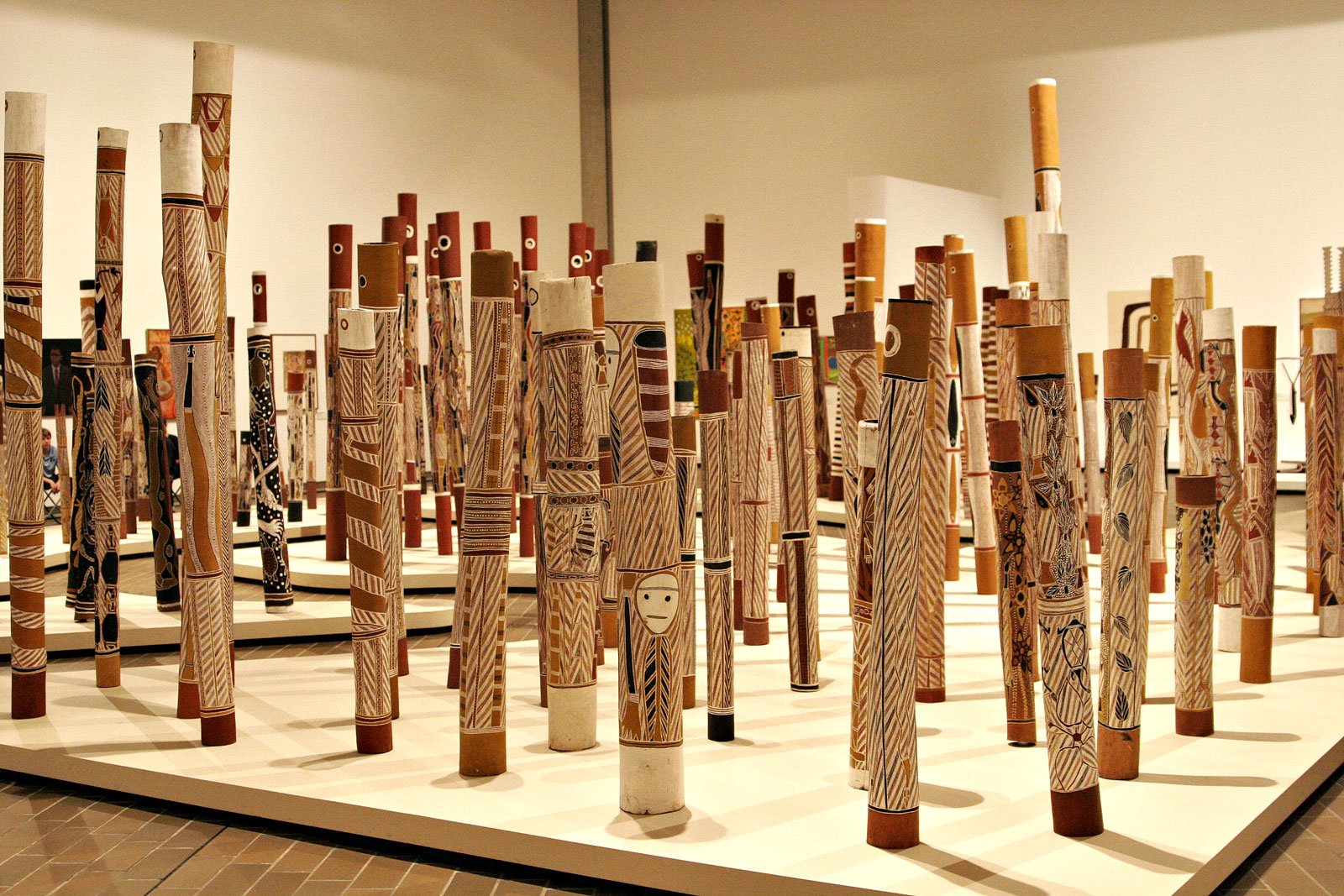
Aboriginal Memorial by Ramingining artists from Arnhem Land

Indigenous art frequently reflects the spiritual traditions, cultural practices and socio-political circumstances of Indigenous people, and these have varied across the country. The works of art accordingly differ greatly from place to place. Major reference works on Australian Indigenous art often discuss works by geographical region. The usual groupings are of art from the Central Australian desert; the Kimberley in Western Australia; the northern regions of the Northern Territory, particularly Arnhem Land, often referred to as the Top End; and northern Queensland, including the Torres Strait Islands. Urban art is also generally treated as a distinct style of Indigenous art, though it is not clearly geographically defined.

=== Desert art ===
Indigenous artists from remote central Australia, particularly the central and western desert area, frequently paint particular 'dreamings', or stories, for which they have personal responsibility or rights. Best known amongst these are the works of the Papunya Tula painters and of Utopia artist Emily Kngwarreye. The patterns portrayed by central Australian artists, such as those from Papunya, originated as translations of traditional motifs marked out in sand, boards or incised into rock. The symbols used in designs may represent place, movement, or people and animals, while dot fields may indicate a range of phenomena such as sparks, clouds or rain.

In the late 1980s and early 1990s the work of Emily Kngwarreye, from the Utopia community north east of Alice Springs, became very popular. Her styles, which changed every year, have been seen as a mixture of traditional Aboriginal and contemporary Australian. Her rise in popularity has prefigured that of many Indigenous artists from central, northern and western Australia, such as her niece Kathleen Petyarre, Angelina Pwerle, Minnie Pwerle, Dorothy Napangardi, Lena Pwerle, and dozens of others, all of whose works have become highly sought after.

There are some figurative approaches in the art of those of central Australia, such as among some of the painters from Balgo, Western Australia. Some central Australian artists whose people were displaced from their lands in the mid-twentieth century by nuclear weapon tests have painted works that use traditional painting techniques but also portray the effects of the blasts on their country.

==== APY lands ====
Anangu Pitjantjatjara Yankunytjatjara, in remote north-western South Australia, is renowned for its artists, who are always well-represented in any exhibitions and awards for Indigenous Australian artists. In 2017, APY artists earned 25 nominations in the prestigious Telstra National Aboriginal & Torres Strait Islander Art Awards; two were named as finalists in the Archibald Prize; 14 APY artists' work made the shortlist for the 2019 A$50,000 Wynne Prize for landscape painting; and in 2019, APY artists also won or were shortlisted for the Ramsay Art Prize, the Sir John Sulman Prize, the John Fries Award, and others. Nici Cumpston, artistic director of Tarnanthi Festival at Art Gallery of South Australia, regularly visits the APY art centres.

The APY Art Centre Collective is as of 2020 a group of ten Indigenous-owned and -governed enterprises which supports artists from across the Lands and helps to market their work. The collective supports collaborative regional projects, such as the renowned Kulata Tjuta project, and the APY Photography initiative. Seven art centres across the Lands support the work of more than 500 Anangu artists, from the oldest one, Ernabella Arts, to Iwantja Arts at Indulkana, whose residents include award-winning Vincent Namatjira. Other APY centres are Tjala Arts (at Amata), Kaltjiti Arts, Mimili Maku Arts and Tjungu Palya (Nyapari). As well as the APY centres, Maruku Arts from Uluru, Tjanpi Desert Weavers based in Alice Springs, and Ara Iritja Aboriginal Corporation bring the number up to ten.

The Collective has galleries in Darlinghurst, Sydney and, since May 2019, a gallery and studio space on Light Square in Adelaide.

=== The Top End ===
In Arnhem Land in the Northern Territory, men have painted their traditional clan designs. The iconography however is quite separate and distinct from that of central Australia. In north Queensland and the Torres Strait many communities continue to practice cultural artistic traditions along with voicing strong political and social messages in their work.

=== Urban art ===
In Indigenous communities across northern Australia most artists have no formal training, their work being based instead on traditional knowledge and skills. In southeast Australia other Indigenous artists, often living in the cities, have trained in art schools and universities. These artists are frequently referred to as "urban" Indigenous artists, although the term is sometimes controversial, and does not accurately describe the origins of some of these individuals, such as Bronwyn Bancroft who grew up in the town of Tenterfield, New South Wales, Michael Riley who came from rural New South Wales near Dubbo and Moree, or Lin Onus who spent time on his father's traditional country on the Murray River near Victoria's Barmah forest. Some, like Onus, were self-taught while others, such as artist Danie Mellor or artist and curator Brenda Croft, completed university studies in fine arts.

=== Contemporary Torres Strait Islander art ===
In the 1990s a group of younger Torres Strait Island artists, including the award-winning Dennis Nona (b. 1973), started translating traditional skills into the more portable forms of printmaking, linocut, and etching, as well as larger scale bronze sculptures. Other outstanding artists include Billy Missi (1970–2012), known for his decorated black and white linocuts of the local vegetation and eco-systems, and Alick Tipoti (b.1975). These and other Torres Strait artists have greatly expanded the forms of Indigenous art within Australia, bringing superb Melanesian carving skills as well as new stories and subject matter. The College of Technical and Further Education on Thursday Island was a starting point for young Islanders to pursue studies in art. Many went on to further art studies, especially in printmaking, initially in Cairns, Queensland and later at the Australian National University in what is now the School of Art and Design. Other artists such as Laurie Nona, Brian Robinson, David Bosun, Glen Mackie, Jomen Nona, Daniel O'Shane, and Tommy Pau are known for their printmaking work.

An exhibition of Alick Tipoti's work, titled Zugubal, was mounted at the Cairns Regional Gallery in July 2015.

== Media ==
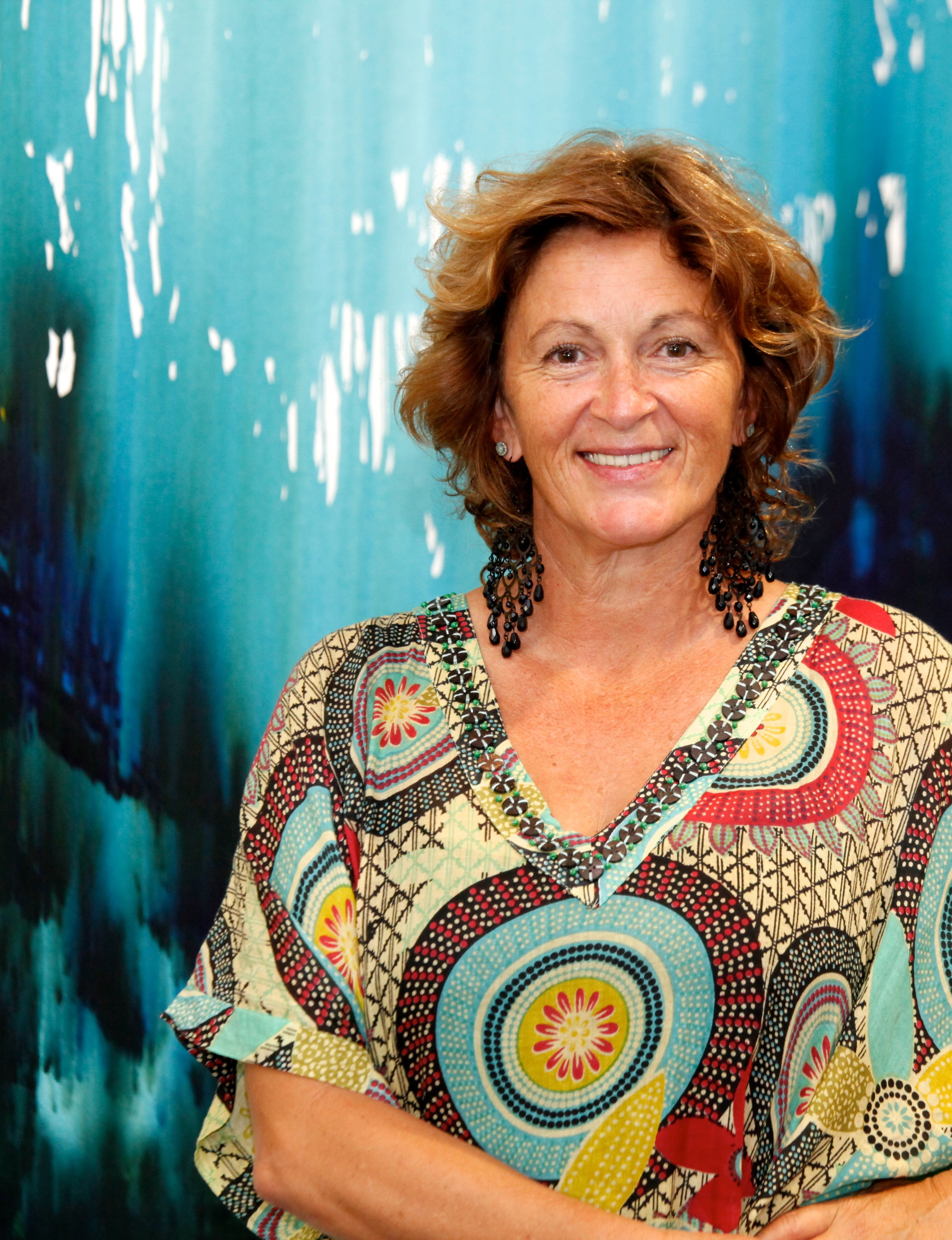
Bronwyn Bancroft, Sydney-based artist who has worked in a wide range of media including textiles, painting and sculpture

Anthropologist Nicholas Thomas observed that contemporary Indigenous art practice was perhaps unique in how "wholly new media were adapted so rapidly to produce work of such palpable strength". Much contemporary Indigenous art is produced using acrylic paint on canvas. However other materials and techniques are in use, often in particular regions. Bark painting predominates amongst artists from Arnhem Land, who also undertake carving and weaving. In central Australian communities associated with the Pitjantjatjara people, pokerwork carving is significant. Aboriginal and Torres Strait Islander printmaking was in 2011 described by the National Gallery's senior curator of prints and drawings as "the most significant development in recent printmaking history".

Textile production including batik has been important in the northwestern desert regions of South Australia, in the Northern Territory's Utopia community, and in other areas of central Australia. For a decade before commencing the painting career that would make her famous, Emily Kngwarreye was creating batik designs that revealed her "prodigious original talent" and the modernity of her artistic vision. A wide range of textile art techniques, including dyeing and weaving, is particularly associated with Pukatja, South Australia (formerly known as Ernabella), but in the mid-2000s the community also developed a reputation for fine sgraffito ceramics. Hermannsburg, originally home to Albert Namatjira and the Arrente Watercolourists, is now renowned for its pottery.

Amongst urban Indigenous artists, more diverse techniques are in use such as silkscreen printing, poster making, photography, television and film. One of the most important contemporary Indigenous artists of his generation, Michael Riley worked in film, video, still photography and digital media. Likewise, Bronwyn Bancroft has worked in fabric, textiles, "jewellery design, painting, collage, illustration, sculpture and interior decoration". Nevertheless, painting remains a medium used by many 'urban' artists, such as Gordon Bennett, Fiona Foley, Trevor Nickolls, Lin Onus, Judy Watson, and Harry Wedge.

== Exhibitions ==
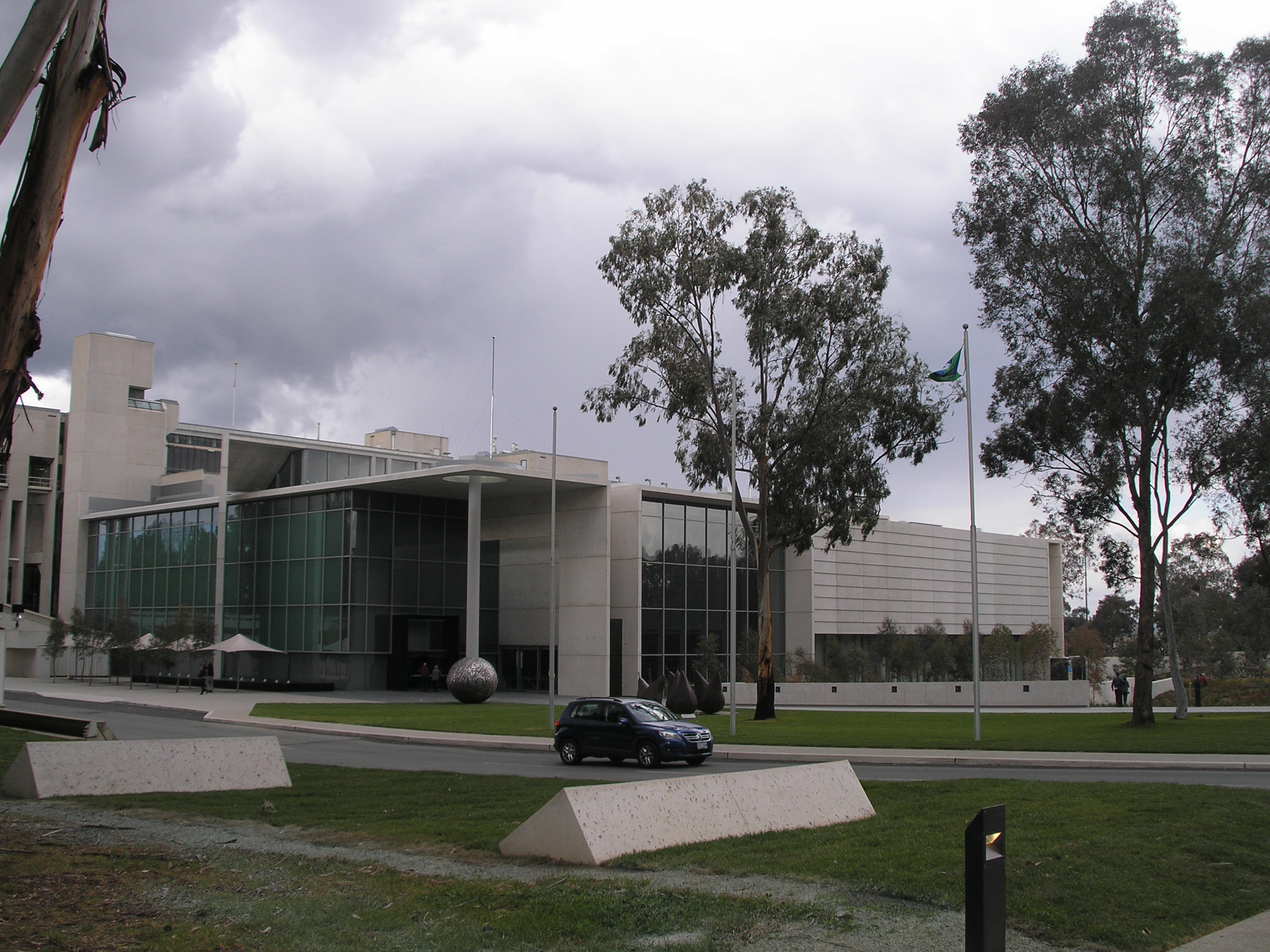
National Gallery of Australia's extension, completed in 2010, which houses a representative collection of Indigenous art, including the Aboriginal Memorial

The public recognition and exhibition of contemporary Indigenous art was initially very limited: for example, it was only a minor part of the collection of the National Gallery of Australia (NGA) when its building was opened in 1982. Early exhibitions of major works were held as part of the Sydney Biennales of 1979 and 1982, while a large-scale sand painting was a feature of the 1981 Sydney Festival. Early private gallery showings of contemporary Indigenous art included a solo exhibition of bark paintings by Johnny Bulunbulun at Hogarth Gallery in Sydney in 1981, and an exhibition of western desert artists at Gallery A in Sydney, which formed part of the 1982 Sydney Festival.

In 1988 the Aboriginal Memorial was unveiled at the National Gallery of Australia in Canberra made from 200 hollow log coffins, which are similar to the type used for mortuary ceremonies in Arnhem Land. It was made for the bicentenary of Australia's colonisation, and is in remembrance of Aboriginal people who had died protecting their land during conflict with settlers. It was created by 43 artists from Ramingining and communities nearby. In that same year, the new Parliament House in Canberra opened with a forecourt featuring a design by Michael Nelson Jagamarra, laid as a mosaic.

There are now a number of regular exhibitions devoted to contemporary Indigenous art. Since 1984, the National Aboriginal and Torres Strait Islander Art Award exhibition has been held in the Northern Territory, under the auspices of the Museum and Art Gallery of the Northern Territory. In 2007, the NGA held the first National Indigenous Art Triennial (NIAT), which included works by thirty contemporary Indigenous artists such as Richard Bell, Danie Mellor, Doreen Reid Nakamarra and Shane Pickett. Despite its name, the second triennial was not held until 2012, and was titled unDisclosed. The third Triennial, Defying Empire, was held in 2017, with the title referencing the 50th anniversary of the 1967 referendum.

The Araluen Centre for Arts and Entertainment, a public art gallery in Alice Springs, hosts the annual Desert Mob exhibition, representing current painting activities across Australia's Aboriginal art centres.

Several individual artists have been the subject of retrospective exhibitions at public galleries. These have included Rover Thomas at the National Gallery of Australia in 1994, Emily Kngwarreye, at the Queensland Art Gallery in 1998, John Mawurndjul at the Tinguely Museum in Basel, Switzerland in 2005, and Paddy Bedford at several galleries including the Museum of Contemporary Art, Sydney in 2006–07.

Internationally, Indigenous artists have represented Australia in the Venice Biennale, including Rover Thomas and Trevor Nickolls in 1990, and Emily Kngwarreye, Judy Watson and Yvonne Koolmatrie in 1997. In 2000, a number of individual artists and artistic collaborations were shown in the prestigious Nicholas Hall at the Hermitage Museum in Russia. In 2003, eight Indigenous artists – Paddy Bedford, John Mawurndjul, Ningura Napurrula, Lena Nyadbi, Michael Riley, Judy Watson, Tommy Watson and Gulumbu Yunupingu – collaborated on a commission to provide works that decorate one of the Musée du quai Branly's four buildings completed in 2006.

In 2005, the Australian Research Council and Land & Water Australia supported an artistic and archaeological collaboration through the project Strata: Deserts Past, Present and Future, which involved Indigenous artists Daisy Jugadai Napaltjarri and Molly Jugadai Napaltjarri.

In London, Tate Modern's exhibition, A Year in Art: Australia 1992, which opened in June 2021, was extended until September 2022 owing to its popularity. In mid-2022, the National Gallery Singapore opened a major exhibition, Ever Present: First Peoples Art of Australia, which is the most extensive show of its type to tour Asia.

== Collections ==
=== Australia ===
Contemporary Indigenous art works are collected by all of Australia's major public galleries. The National Gallery of Australia has a significant collection, and a new wing was opened in 2010 for its permanent exhibition. Some state galleries, such as the Art Gallery of New South Wales, the National Gallery of Victoria (NGV), the Art Gallery of Western Australia; and the Museum and Art Gallery of the Northern Territory, have gallery space permanently dedicated to the exhibition of contemporary Indigenous art. The NGV's collection includes the country's main collection of Indigenous batik.

South Australia has many galleries showcasing Aboriginal art. The Art Gallery of South Australia has an extensive collection, as well as being host to Tarnanthi, which includes an exhibition, art fair, and other activities across the state every two years, led by curator Nici Cumpston. Flinders University Museum of Art has been collecting Aboriginal and Torres Strait Islander art since the early 1980s. Others showcasing Indigenous art include JamFactory craft and design centre; Samstag Museum of Art; Tandanya National Aboriginal Cultural Institute; Nexus Arts; and the smaller but notable Hugo Michell Gallery.

The Araluen Centre for Arts & Entertainment in Alice Springs hosts the country's largest collection of works by Albert Namatjira.

=== International galleries ===
Galleries outside Australia acquiring contemporary Indigenous art include the British Museum and the Victoria and Albert Museum in London. The Rebecca Hossack gallery in London has been credited with "almost single-handedly" introducing Australian Indigenous art to Britain and Europe since its opening in 1988.

The Musée du Quai Branly in Paris, France, which opened in 2006, has an "Oceania" collection. It also commissioned paintings on the roof and ceilings of its building on the rue de l'Université, housing the museum's workshops and library, by four female and four male contemporary Aboriginal artists: Lena Nyadbi, Judy Watson, Gulumbu Yunupingu, Ningura Napurrula; John Mawurndjul, Paddy Nyunkuny Bedford, Michael Riley, and Yannima Tommy Watson.

New York's Metropolitan Museum of Art acquires Indigenous art. Other permanent displays of Indigenous art outside Australia are found at Seattle Art Museum and Glasgow's Gallery of Modern Art.

Museums dedicated solely to Indigenous art (contemporary and traditional) outside of Australia include the following:

- The Kluge-Ruhe Aboriginal Art Collection of the University of Virginia, which opened in its current location in 1999, exhibits solely Australian Aboriginal art, and regularly mounts exhibitions.
- The La Grange museum for Australian Aboriginal art in the village of Môtiers, near Neuchâtel, Switzerland, is one of the few museums in Europe that dedicates itself entirely the art and culture of Aboriginal Australian peoples. During seasonal exhibitions, works of art by internationally renowned artists are shown. It opened in 2008.

The Museum of Contemporary Aboriginal Art, in Utrecht, Netherlands, was dedicated to contemporary Aboriginal Australian art, but closed in 2017.

== Awards ==
=== Individual winners ===
Contemporary Indigenous art works have won a number of Australia's principal national art prizes, including the Wynne Prize, the Clemenger Contemporary Art Award and the Blake Prize for Religious Art. Indigenous awardees have included Shirley Purdie, 2007 winner of the Blake Prize with her work Stations of the Cross; 2003 Clemenger Award winner John Mawurndjul, and 2006 Clemenger winner Judy Watson. The Wynne Prize has been won by contemporary Indigenous artists on several occasions, including in 1999 by Gloria Petyarre with Leaves; in 2004 by George Tjungurrayi; and in 2008 by Joanne Currie Nalingu, with her painting The river is calm.

As well as winning major prizes, Indigenous artists have been well represented among the finalists in these competitions. The Blake Prize has included numerous Indigenous finalists, such as Bronwyn Bancroft (2008), Angelina Ngal, Cowboy Loy Pwerl, Genevieve Kemarr Loy and Irene (Mbitjana) Entata (2009), Dinni Kunoth Kemarre, Elizabeth Kunoth Kngwarray (2010), and Linda Syddick Napaltjarri (on three occasions).

=== Indigenous art prizes ===
Australia's major Indigenous art prize is the National Aboriginal & Torres Strait Islander Art Award. Established by the Museum and Art Gallery of the Northern Territory in 1984, the award includes a major winner and several category awards, including: one for bark painting, one for works on paper, one for three-dimensional works and, introduced for the first time in 2010, one for new media. Winners of the major prize have included Makinti Napanangka in 2008, and Danie Mellor in 2009.

In 2008, the Art Gallery of Western Australia established the Western Australian Indigenous Art Awards, which include the country's most valuable Indigenous art cash prize of A$50,000, as well as a A$10,000 prize for the top Western Australian artist, and a A$5000 People's Choice Award, all selected from the field of finalists, which includes 15 individuals and one collaborative group. The 2009 winner of the main prize was Ricardo Idagi, while the People's Choice award was won by Shane Pickett. In 2013, Churchill Cann won the Best West Australian Piece (A$10,000) and North Queensland artist Brian Robinson won the Best Overall prize (A$50,000).

Wayne Quilliam was awarded the 2009 NAIDOC Artist of the Year for his many years of work on the local and international scene working with Indigenous groups throughout the world.

The National Indigenous Heritage Art Awards were held in Canberra from 1993 until 2000, with entries exhibited at Old Parliament House.

== Benefits and costs ==
The flowering of Indigenous art has delivered economic, social and cultural benefits to Indigenous Australians, who are socially and economically disadvantaged compared to the Australian community as a whole. The sale of art works is a significant economic activity for individual artists and for their communities. Estimates of the size of the sector vary, but placed its value in the early 2000s at A$100 to 300 million, and by 2007 at half a billion dollars and growing. The sector is particularly important to many Indigenous communities because, as well being a source of cash for an economically disadvantaged group, it reinforces Indigenous identity and tradition, and has aided the maintenance of social cohesion. For example, early works painted at Papunya were created by senior Aboriginal men to help educate younger generations about their culture and their cultural responsibilities.

"There is currently an upsurge in interest in Aboriginal art among the Australian public and overseas visitors...The resultant pressure on artists to produce has led ultimately to a collapse or emasculation of the art form. Aboriginal art is now under incredible strain to fulfil white demands on Aboriginal culture."

— Indigenous Australian activist Djon Mundine, writing during Australia's bicentennial year, 1988.

Fraud and exploitation have been significant issues affecting contemporary Indigenous Australian art, especially after the 1990s boom. Indigenous art works were reproduced without artists' permission, including by the Reserve Bank of Australia when it used a David Malangi painting on the one-dollar note in 1966. Similar appropriation of material has taken place with fabric designs, T-shirts, and carpets. One of the main reasons the Warlukurlangu Artists movement, based at Yuendumu was established, and later flourished, was due to the feeling of exploitation amongst artists. In the 2000s, there were claims of artists being kidnapped, or relocated against the wishes of their families, by people keen to acquire the artists' paintings. In August 2006, following concerns raised about unethical practices in the Indigenous art sector, the Australian Senate initiated an inquiry into issues in the sector, which published its report in 2007.

Artists, particularly in the remoter parts of Australia, sometimes paint for outlets other than the Indigenous art centres or their own companies. They do this for economic reasons; however, the resulting paintings can be of uneven quality, and of precarious economic value. Doubts about the provenance of Indigenous paintings, and about the prices paid for them, spawned media scrutiny around 2006, an Australian parliamentary inquiry, and were a factor limiting the growth in value of works. Questions regarding the authenticity of works have arisen in relation to particular artists, including Emily Kngwarreye, Rover Thomas, Kathleen Petyarre, Turkey Tolson Tjupurrula, Ginger Riley Munduwalawala, and Clifford Possum Tjapaltjarri; in 2001 an art dealer was jailed for fraud in relation to Clifford Possum's work. These pressures led in 2009 to the introduction of a commercial code of conduct, intended to establish "minimum standards of practice and fair dealing in the Indigenous visual arts industry". However, persistent problems in the industry in September 2012 led the chair of the code's administering body Indigenous Art Code, Ron Merkel, to call for the code to be made mandatory for art dealers.

Prices fetched in the secondary market for Indigenous art works vary widely. Until 2007, the record at auction for an Indigenous art work was $778,750 paid in 2003 for a Rover Thomas painting, All That Big Rain Coming from the Top Side. In 2007, a major work by Emily Kngwarreye, Earth's Creation, sold for $1.056 million, a new record that was however eclipsed only a few months later, when Clifford Possum's epic work Warlugulong was bought for $2.4 million by the National Gallery of Australia. At the same time, however, works by prominent artists but of doubtful provenance were being passed in at auctions.

In 2003 there were 97 Indigenous Australian artists whose works were being sold at auction in Australia for prices above $5000, with the total auction market worth around $9.5 million. In that year Sotheby's estimated that half of sales were to bidders outside Australia. Despite concerns about supply and demand for paintings, the remoteness of many of the artists, and the poverty and health issues experienced in the communities, in 2007 it was estimated that the industry worth close to half a billion Australian dollars each year, and growing rapidly. By 2012, the market had changed, with older works fetching higher prices than contemporary paintings.

A 2011 change in Australian superannuation investment rules resulted in a sharp decline in sales of new Indigenous art. The change prohibits assets acquired for a self-managed superannuation fund from being "used" before retirement; in particular, an artwork must be kept in storage rather than displayed.

== Influence on non-Indigenous artists ==
Initially a source of ethnographic interest, and later an artistic movement with roots outside Western art traditions, Indigenous art was influenced by, and had influence upon, few European Australian artists. The early works of Margaret Preston sometimes expressed motifs from traditional Indigenous art; her later works show a deeper influence, "in the use of colours, in the interplay of figuration and abstraction in the formal structure". In contrast, Hans Heysen, though he admired fellow landscapist Albert Namatjira and collected his paintings, was not influenced by his Indigenous counterpart. The contemporary Indigenous art movement has influenced some non-Indigenous Australian artists through collaborative projects. Indigenous artists Gordon Bennett and Michael Nelson Jagamarra have engaged in both collaborative artworks and exhibitions with gallerist Michael Eather, and painter Imants Tillers, the Australian-born son of Latvian refugees.

== Assessment ==
Professor of art history Ian McLean described the birth of the contemporary Indigenous art movement in 1971 as "the most fabulous moment in Australian art history", and considered that it was becoming one of Australia's founding myths, like the ANZAC spirit. Art historian Wally Caruana called Indigenous art "the last great tradition of art to be appreciated by the world at large", and contemporary Indigenous art is the only art movement of international significance to emerge from Australia. Leading critic Robert Hughes saw it as "the last great art movement of the 20th century", while poet Les Murray thought of it as "Australia's equivalent of jazz". Paintings by the artists of the western desert in particular have quickly achieved "an extraordinarily widespread reputation", with collectors competing to obtain them. Some Indigenous artists are regarded as amongst Australia's foremost creative talent; Emily Kngwarreye has been described as "one of the greatest modern Australian painters", and "among the best Australian artists, arguably amongst the best of her time." Critics reviewing the Hermitage Museum exhibition in 2000 were fulsome in their praise, one remarking: "This is an exhibition of contemporary art, not in the sense that it was done recently, but in that it is cased in the mentality, technology and philosophy of radical art of the most recent times. No one, other than the Aborigines of Australia, has succeeded in exhibiting such art at the Hermitage".

The assessments have not been universally favourable. When an exhibition was held in the United Kingdom in 1993, a reviewer in The Independent described the works as "perhaps the most boring art in the world". Museum curator Philip Batty, who had been involved in assisting the creation and sale of art in central Australia, expressed concern at the effect of the non-Indigenous art market on the artists – particularly Emily Kngwarreye – and their work. He wrote "there was always a danger that the European component of this cross-cultural partnership would become overly dominant. By the end of her brief career, I think that Emily had all but evacuated this intercultural domain, and her work simply became a mirror image of European desires". Outstanding art works are mixed with poor ones, with the passage of time yet to filter the good from the bad.

=== 2020s resurgence ===
There was evidence of a resurgence of interest in contemporary Australian Indigenous art in the early 2020s, both at home and abroad. Works at the Fremantle Arts Centre's 2022 Revealed exhibition, featuring early-career artists, sold three-quarters of the works on the first night. In London, England, Tate Modern's exhibition, A Year in Art: Australia 1992, which opened in June 2021, was extended until September 2022 owing to its popularity. In 2022, Sotheby's in New York moved its annual Australian Indigenous art sale from the winter off-season to the May "marquee month", with the highest-selling work going for just over one million Australian dollars. In mid-2022, the National Gallery Singapore opened a major exhibition, Ever Present: First Peoples Art of Australia, which is the most extensive show of its type to tour Asia.

== See also ==
- APY Art Centre Collective
- Indigenous Australian art
- List of Indigenous Australian art movements and cooperatives
- Torres Strait Islander art

== Bibliography ==
- Bedford, Paddy and Russell Storer (2006). Paddy Bedford. Sydney: Museum of Contemporary Art. ISBN 1-921034-16-5.
- Butler, Roger (2011). "Print – Matters". In Jaynie Anderson (ed.). The Cambridge Companion to Australian Art. Cambridge: Cambridge University Press. pp. 97–108. ISBN 978-1-107-60158-1.
- Carty, John; French, Alison (2011). "Art of Central Australia: Refigured Ground". In Jaynie Anderson (ed.). The Cambridge Companion to Australian Art. Cambridge: Cambridge University Press. pp. 122–142. ISBN 978-1-107-60158-1.
- Caruana, Wally (2003). Aboriginal Art (2nd ed.). London: Thames & Hudson. ISBN 978-0-500-20366-8.
- Croft, Brenda (2006). Michael Riley: Sights Unseen. Canberra: National Gallery of Australia. ISBN 0-642-54162-0.
- Croft, Brenda, ed (2007). Culture Warriors: National Indigenous Art Triennial 2007. Canberra: National Gallery of Australia. ISBN 978-0-642-54133-8.
- Cubillo, Franchesca; Wally Caruana, eds. (2010). Aboriginal & Torres Strait Islander Art: Collection Highlights. Canberra: National Gallery of Australia. ISBN 978-0-642-33414-5.
- Dussart, Francoise (2006). "Canvassing identities: reflecting on the acrylic art movement in an Australian Aboriginal settlement". Aboriginal History. 30: 156–168.
- (no editor) (1996). Emily Kngwarreye – Paintings. North Ryde New South Wales: Craftsman House / G + B Arts International. ISBN 90-5703-681-9.
- Genocchio, Benjamin (2008). Dollar Dreaming. Prahran, VIC: Hardie Grant Books. ISBN 978-1-74066-609-1.
- Greer, Germaine, ed (2004). Whitefella Jump Up: The Shortest Way to Nationhood. London: Profile Books. ISBN 1-86197-739-5.
- Horton, David, ed (1994). Encyclopaedia of Aboriginal Australia. Volume 1. Canberra: Aboriginal Studies Press for the Australian Institute of Aboriginal and Torres Strait Islander Studies. ISBN 978-0-85575-234-7.
- Jenkins, Susan (2004). No Ordinary Place: the Art of David Malangi. Canberra: National Gallery of Australia. ISBN 0-642-54179-5.
- Johnson, Vivien (1994). Aboriginal Artists of the Western Desert: A Biographical Dictionary. Roseville East, NSW: Craftsman House. ISBN 976-8097-81-7.
- Johnson, Vivien, ed (2007). Papunya Painting: Out of the Desert. Canberra: National Museum of Australia. ISBN 978-1-876944-58-2.
- Johnson, Vivien (2010). Once Upon a Time in Papunya. Sydney: University of New South Wales Press. ISBN 978-1-74223-007-8.
- Kleinert, Sylvia and Margot Neale, eds (2000). The Oxford Companion to Aboriginal Art and Culture. Oxford: Oxford University Press. ISBN 0-19-550649-9.
- McCulloch, Alan; Susan McCulloch and Emily McCulloch Childs (2006). The New McCulloch's Encyclopedia of Australian Art. Fitzroy, Victoria: Aus Art Editions in association with The Miegunyah Press. ISBN 0-522-85317-X.
- McCulloch, Susan and Emily McCulloch Childs (2008). McCulloch's Contemporary Aboriginal Art: The Complete Guide. 3rd edition. Balnarring, Victoria: McCulloch & McCulloch. ISBN 978-0-9804494-2-6.
- McLean, Ian (2011). "The Gift that Time Gave: Myth and History in the Western Desert Painting Movement". In Jaynie Anderson (ed.). The Cambridge Companion to Australian Art. Cambridge: Cambridge University Press. pp. 180–192. ISBN 978-1-107-60158-1.
- Morphy, Howard (2011). "Coming to Terms with Aboriginal Art in the 1960s". In Jaynie Anderson (ed.). The Cambridge Companion to Australian Art. Cambridge: Cambridge University Press. pp. 153–167. ISBN 978-1-107-60158-1.
- Morphy, Howard (1999). Aboriginal Art. London: Phaidon. ISBN 0-7148-3752-0.
- Murphy, John, ed (2009). Gallery A Sydney 1964–1983. Campbelltown NSW: Campbelltown Arts Centre, and Newcastle NSW: Newcastle Region Art Gallery. ISBN 978-1-875199-67-9.
- Rothwell, Nicholas (2007). Another Country. Melbourne: Black Inc. ISBN 978-1-86395-382-5.
- Ryan, Judith (2008). Across the Desert: Aboriginal Batik from Central Australia. Melbourne: National Gallery of Victoria. ISBN 978-0-7241-0299-0.
- Ryan, Judith; Carol Cooper and Joy Murphy-Wandin (2003). Remembering Barak. Melbourne: National Gallery of Victoria. ISBN 0-7241-0222-1.
- Senate Environment, Communications, Information Technology and the Arts Committee (2007). Indigenous Art – Securing the Future. Australia's Indigenous Visual Arts and Craft Sector. Canberra: The Senate. ISBN 978-0-642-71788-7.
- Thomas, Nicholas (1999). Possessions. Indigenous Art / Colonial Culture. London: Thames and Hudson. ISBN 0-500-28097-5
