= Nyuju Stumpy Brown =

Australian artist (1924–2011)

- Born: 1 July 1924; Canning Stock Route, Ngapawarlu, Western Australia
- Died: 13 September 2011 (aged 87); Fitzroy Crossing, Western Australia
- Other names: Kumanjayi Brown
- Occupation: Painter
- Children: 3
- Relatives: Rover Thomas (brother)

Nyuju Stumpy Brown (1 July 1924 – 13 September 2011) was a Wangkatjungka Indigenous Australian painter and law woman, a prominent figure in the law and culture of Fitzroy Crossing, Western Australia.

== Early life ==
Nyuju Stumpy Brown was born 1 July 1924 on the Canning Stock Route in Ngapawarlu, Western Australia. She grew up in the Great Sandy Desert. She was also known as Kumanjayi Brown. When her parents died while she was young, Brown was then raised by her drover uncle, Jamali Wally Darlington. Her brother, Rover Thomas, was an artist. Darlington took Brown, by camel, to the Catholic Mission in Balgo where she learned English before they moved to Fitzroy Crossing. She said in an interview that she had never seen a white person until she was 15 years old.

Early on, Brown, as a domestic worker at Emmanuel Station in Fitzroy Crossing. was not paid a wage, but received meat and tobacco in a barter arrangement.

== Career ==
Brown was to become a "law woman", a prominent figure in the law and culture of the Fitzroy Crossing community. She ran the corroboree (Nyanpi) ceremonies for the town's children. Brown was also in charge of Women's Law from Wangkatjungka to Balgo.

Her paintings were held in collections at the National Gallery of Australia, the National Gallery of Victoria, the Berndt Museum of Anthropology, Northern Territory University, and the Lepley Collection. She participated in numerous group exhibitions.

== Artistry ==
Brown had a spontaneous painting style that incorporated strong colours. Several of her works included a circle as a symbol for various subjects including geographical places, waterholes, and bush foods.

While describing her work Pura (2003), art curator Wally Caruana stated, "Her canvases have a jewel-like quality about them that are one part Venetian glass, two parts Hundertwasser, and five parts Great Sandy Desert with a twist of Lower Manhattan graffiti."

Caruana added that:

"It came as no surprise to learn she [Brown] had worked with other senior artists on two huge canvases that were used in a native title action in 1996. "In the hearings, claimants stand on their section of the `map' and describe their relationship to their land and the relationship to the land of neighbouring groups. In each painting, the only concession to Western mapping is the depiction of the Canning Stock Route as a point of reference for those comparing the painting to a European map of the region."

== Personal life ==
Brown spoke Wangkatjunga. She married Fitzroy Mission church leader, Pukulu. They had three daughters. In 1992, she later married Hitler Pamba, lawman and fellow Wangkatjunga artist and lived in the Mindi Rardi section of Fitzroy.

== Death ==
After a stroke in 2007, Brown retired from painting.

She died in September 2011.

== Awards ==
Brown won a Kimberley Art Prize in 2005.

== See also ==
- Indigenous Australian art
