= Stacy Mader =

Australian astronomer

- Born: Wyndham, Western Australia
- Education: University of Wollongong
- Scientific career
- Fields: Astrophysics
- Workplaces: CSIRO
- Academic advisors: Bill Zealey

Stacy Lyall Mader is an Australian astronomer. He is a Senior Experimental Scientist at CSIRO Astronomy and Space Science, and was the first Aboriginal Australian to obtain a PhD in astronomy.

== Early life, education and research ==
Mader is a Gidja man from Wyndham, in the Kimberly region of Western Australia. He received a Bachelor of Science with Honours in Physics from the University of Western Australia in 1993, and then Masters (1995) and PhD (2000) degrees from the University of Wollongong. His PhD thesis, entitled "Giant Herbig-Haro Flows: Identification And Consequences", studied outflows in star-forming regions. His subsequent research has covered neutral and ionized gas in galaxies, protostars, and the search for extraterrestrial intelligence. Mader was also part of the Voyager II and Mars missions in 2003/2004 respectively.

== Career ==
Mader joined CSIRO's Parkes Observatory in 1999. He supports astronomical observations and spacecraft tracking with Parkes, and observations with the Australian Square Kilometre Array Pathfinder.

Mader has programmed several astrophysics related tools, an example being a program to calculate the position of the sun, moon, and other planets and any given time.

== Honors and awards ==
- NASA Group Achievement Award (2003)
- NASA Group Achievement Award (2013)
- CSIRO Chairman’s Medal (2015)
- NASA Group Achievement Award (2019)
