= Mistake Creek massacre =

1915 frontier massacre of Indigenous Australians in Australia

- Part of Australian frontier conflicts
- Location: 16°55′37″S 128°14′31″E; Mistake Creek, East Kimberley, Western Australia
- Date: 28 March 1915
- Target: Gija people
- Attack type: Mass shooting
- Weapons: Rifles; Revolvers
- Deaths: 8–32
- Perpetrators: Michael Ratigan and two of his Aboriginal employees
- No. of participants: 3 attackers and up to 35 Gija people
- Motive: Reprisal for the theft of a cow
- Accused: Michael Rhatigan and Nipper
- Charges: Murder
- Verdict: Michael Rhatigan: Never tried; Nipper: Not Guilty
- Convictions: None
- Convicted: None

The Mistake Creek massacre was a massacre of Indigenous Australians that took place in Western Australia in 1915.

== Massacre ==
On 28 March 1915, between 8 and 32 Gija people were shot and killed, and their bodies burned, at Mistake Creek in the East Kimberley. Exactly who was responsible and why the massacre occurred have remained uncertain, but the perpetrators are believed to have been an ex-policeman and telegraph linesman from Warmun (then known as Turkey Creek) called Michael "Mick" Rhatigan and two of his Indigenous employees, Jim Wynne and Nipper. Rhatigan had been involved in earlier massacres of Aboriginal people during his time as a police constable, including one in 1895 where around 20 people were killed.

According to Gija oral history, the motive was the mistaken belief that one of Rhatigan's milking cows had been killed and eaten by members of the camp that was attacked. The oral history accounts state that Rhatigan was directly involved in the massacre, with Wynne and Nipper assisting. There is some suggestion that Wynne, who was not Gija himself, had encouraged the massacre in some way, possibly due to a dispute over a woman. The Gija oral history seems to have been derived from accounts given by survivors of the massacre.

== Aftermath ==
Rhatigan and Nipper were arrested. Wynne was shot dead by police whilst trying to escape after he was seen near one of the bodies and tried to run away after refusing orders to surrender. A coroner's inquest held at Turkey Creek acquitted Rhatigan of any wrongdoing, while Nipper was ordered to face trial for the murder of eight people. Wynne's death was ruled a "justifiable homicide", and the constable who shot Wynne was commended by the jury for his "promptness" in shooting him as he was allegedly "a most dangerous character". Nipper was found not guilty and was released, and later worked at the police stables in Perth.

Rhatigan remained a telegraph linesman at Turkey Creek until his death in 1920. His son, John Rhatigan, became a long-serving Labor politician in the Western Australian Legislative Assembly.

== Differing versions ==
In 2001 controversy arose following a visit by the Governor General, William Deane, to the site of the massacre. According to columnist Miranda Devine, reporting on historian Keith Windschuttle's version of events, Deane personally apologised for the events at Mistake Creek and for other frontier killings by white people, mentioning Rhatigan and his employees had committed the massacre over the mistaken belief that a cow had been stolen. Windschuttle asserted that there were no Europeans involved in the massacre, and that it was a drastic escalation of a dispute over a woman. He stated that Wynne and Nipper were the only ones involved, starting a debate on the actual details of the massacre.

Windschuttle's account was vigorously rebutted by WA historian Cathie Clement, who also said the Windschuttle's reporting of Deane's visit was factually incorrect, and that he did not actually make an apology at all, citing the original sources of that story. She also stated that Windschuttle's version of the reporting of events passed down in oral history and related by Patrick O'Brien was incorrect, and had been corrected by O'Brien.

Later research has shown that the oral and visual histories are significant, and today they are given more weight than they were in the past, when they were often dismissed in favour of colonial representations of history.

== In art ==
Gija people from Warmun (Turkey Creek) community have depicted the massacre in their artworks.

A painting by well-known Aboriginal artist Queenie McKenzie depicting the massacre was bought by the National Museum of Australia in 2005, but was not put on display as it was claimed to depict an "event which never occurred". Ian McLean, University of Melbourne's Hugh Ramsay chair of Australian Art History, said that this was a political decision, made in the era of the "history wars". In July 2020 it was put on display as part of a new exhibition titled Talking Blak to History at the Museum.

== See also ==
- List of massacres of Indigenous Australians
