= Warmun Community, Western Australia =

Town in Western Australia

Warmun Community
- Town
- Interactive map of Warmun Community
- Coordinates: 17°02′00″S 128°13′00″E
- Country: Australia
- State: Western Australia
- LGA: Shire of Halls Creek
- Location: 3,009 km (1,870 mi) north east of Perth, Western Australia; 858 km (533 mi) east of Broome

Government
  - State electorate: Kimberley
  - Federal division: Durack

Area
  - Total: 20.3 km^{2} (7.8 sq mi)
- Elevation: 207 m (679 ft)

Population
  - Total: 457 (SAL 2021)
- Postcode: 6743

Warmun (also known as Turkey Creek or Warmun Community) is a township and locality in the Kimberley region of Western Australia, located on the Great Northern Highway, 3,000 kilometres (1,900 mi) northeast of Perth, Western Australia. The closest populated town is Halls Creek, about 160 km (99 mi) to the south. It is about 200 km (120 mi) south of Kununurra. Turkey Creek is a small creek that runs through the community.

== History ==
The Gija people are the traditional owners of the area, having inhabited it for thousands of years. Its name in Gija language is Warrmarn.

The area was settled by European pastoralists in the 19th century but the community was established in 1901 when the state government built a ration depot at Turkey Creek.

=== Mistake Creek massacre ===
In March 1915, Michael Rhatigan, a telegraph linesman based at Turkey Creek, together with his two Aboriginal employees, Joe Wynne and Nipper, shot dead twelve Gija people at Mistake Creek in the East Kimberley, in an incident which became known as the Mistake Creek massacre. They initially rushed an Aboriginal camp killing six men, burning their remains. Six women were later rounded up and shot dead. A police squad was sent to track down and capture Rhatigan and his accomplices. Rhatigan and Nipper were arrested, while Wynne was shot dead by police. A coroner's inquest held at Turkey Creek acquitted Rhatigan of any wrongdoing, while Nipper was ordered to face trial for the murder of eight people. Nipper was found not guilty and was released. He later worked at the police stables in Perth. According to local Aboriginal oral history, the massacre was in reprisal for the killing of Rhatigan's cow; the cow was later claimed to have been found alive after the massacre had taken place.

Rhatigan remained a telegraph linesman at Turkey Creek until his death in 1920. His son, John Rhatigan, became a long serving Labor Party politician in the Western Australian Legislative Assembly.

=== 2011 floods ===
Devastating flash flooding occurred in March 2011, affecting most of the houses, the school, the clinic, and the Warmun Art Centre, including its new gallery. At that time, Turkey Creek ran through the centre of the community. The whole community was evacuated, but there were no deaths, and all buildings were eventually rebuilt on higher ground.

== Climate ==
Climate data for Warmun (1991–2020 normals, extremes 1962–present)
Month	Jan	Feb	Mar	Apr	May	Jun	Jul	Aug	Sep	Oct	Nov	Dec	Year
Record high °C (°F)	46.1 (115.0)	43.7 (110.7)	43.4 (110.1)	41.5 (106.7)	38.6 (101.5)	37.3 (99.1)	37.2 (99.0)	40.0 (104.0)	41.5 (106.7)	44.9 (112.8)	46.5 (115.7)	45.7 (114.3)	46.5 (115.7)
Mean daily maximum °C (°F)	36.9 (98.4)	35.9 (96.6)	36.1 (97.0)	35.4 (95.7)	32.1 (89.8)	29.7 (85.5)	29.9 (85.8)	32.3 (90.1)	36.7 (98.1)	38.8 (101.8)	39.4 (102.9)	37.8 (100.0)	35.1 (95.2)
Daily mean °C (°F)	30.8 (87.4)	30.1 (86.2)	29.8 (85.6)	28.1 (82.6)	24.5 (76.1)	21.8 (71.2)	21.5 (70.7)	23.5 (74.3)	28.1 (82.6)	30.9 (87.6)	32.3 (90.1)	31.5 (88.7)	27.7 (81.9)
Mean daily minimum °C (°F)	24.7 (76.5)	24.4 (75.9)	23.4 (74.1)	20.7 (69.3)	16.9 (62.4)	13.9 (57.0)	13.0 (55.4)	14.6 (58.3)	19.6 (67.3)	23.0 (73.4)	25.2 (77.4)	25.2 (77.4)	20.4 (68.7)
Record low °C (°F)	19.0 (66.2)	18.0 (64.4)	14.9 (58.8)	10.9 (51.6)	4.5 (40.1)	2.0 (35.6)	1.0 (33.8)	4.2 (39.6)	6.8 (44.2)	10.4 (50.7)	15.4 (59.7)	17.0 (62.6)	1.0 (33.8)
Average precipitation mm (inches)	205.1 (8.07)	211.2 (8.31)	135.6 (5.34)	28.5 (1.12)	12.0 (0.47)	5.2 (0.20)	1.8 (0.07)	0.5 (0.02)	4.5 (0.18)	35.7 (1.41)	77.3 (3.04)	149.4 (5.88)	866.8 (34.13)
Average precipitation days (≥ 1 mm)	13.2	13.1	8.8	2.2	1.1	0.4	0.3	0.1	0.5	3.2	6.6	11.4	61.0
Average dew point °C (°F)	21.3 (70.3)	21.9 (71.4)	19.0 (66.2)	13.4 (56.1)	9.6 (49.3)	7.2 (45.0)	5.3 (41.5)	4.4 (39.9)	8.7 (47.7)	12.3 (54.1)	16.7 (62.1)	20.0 (68.0)	13.3 (55.9)
Source 1: National Oceanic and Atmospheric Administration
Source 2: Bureau of Meteorology

== Governance ==
The community is managed through its incorporated body, Warmun Community (Turkey Creek) Incorporated, which was incorporated under the Associations Incorporation Act, 1895-1969 (WA) in 1977.

== Facilities and attractions ==
The Ngalangangpum School was established in town at the request of the community. Built in 1979, the school allowed students to stay in town rather than attend St Joseph's School in Wyndham and only come home over the holidays. The school was significantly upgraded in 1987, then again in 1990 so that secondary schooling could occur in town, and again in 2001.

== Art ==
Warmun art has an international reputation. In 1975, artists Rover Thomas and Paddy Jaminji began to collaborate in their art practice at Warmun, setting the course for contemporary Aboriginal art in the east Kimberley. Significant past artists, leaders and elders at Warmun include Queenie McKenzie, Madigan Thomas, Hector Jandany, George Mung Mung (c.1921–1991), and Jack Britten. Rover Thomas and Queenie MacKenzie in particular are recognised as pioneers of contemporary Indigenous art in Australia.

British businessman Alistair McAlpine (1942–2014), wrote of the artistic reputation of the area in a 2002 memoir:

But Turkey Creek, for all its lack of modern facilities, is the home of one of Australia's most exciting schools of painting. It first came to fame when Rover Thomas, one of its citizens, represented Australia at the Venice Biennale. His friend Paddy Tjamati was another of Turkey Creek's painters who broke away from the idea of simply reproducing tribal patterns on canvas. These two artists painted the landscapes of their country on dismembered tea-chests (..) Since the days of Paddy Tjamati and Rover Thomas's early efforts, a great deal of interest has been paid to the work of the painters from Turkey Creek.

=== Warmun Art Centre ===
==== History ====
Warmun Art Centre was established in 1998 by Rover Thomas, Queenie McKenzie, Madigan Thomas, Hector Jandany, and others, as a community-owned and -controlled centre that maintains, supports and promotes Gija art, language and culture.

The 2011 floods rose quickly around the art centre, causing around 600 works in the gallery to float away in the water. The Warmun community collection, an art collection of great significance consisting of around 400 works, was locked away in a secure room, and although they were water-damaged, they were able to be restored by expert conservationists at Melbourne University. The artworks were returned to the art centre in June 2013, after the building had been rebuilt, located on a riverbank opposite the residential area.

The art centre was closed for two years and two months during the COVID-19 pandemic in Australia. During this time the interior was redecorated, and works were shown through new virtual software, while the artists worked from home. Online sales continued and strong demand continued. The centre reopened in May 2022, owing to its location away from the residents, to whom access continued to be restricted. Visitors are obliged to follow COVID-19 prevention protocols, including taking a rapid antigen test before entry.

==== Goals, style and themes ====
The primary goal of the centre is "the conservation of culturally and socially significant objects and knowledge systems", using art to achieve this. All profits are returned to the community.

Artists at the centre are known for their distinctive style, using ochre and other natural pigments on canvas to represent traditional Dreaming stories as well as everyday life of the people. The typical style is described as "simple and uncluttered, painted with natural ochre, with shapes being defined by rows of white dots". The Gija artists' work often includes topographical maps in painted with ochre, sometimes using gum gathered from local bloodwood trees as a fixative.

Members of the Gija people from the Warmun community have depicted the Mistake Creek massacre in their artworks.

==== Collections and contemporary artists ====
The work of Warmun artists is held and has been exhibited in significant local and international collections, including the Art Gallery of Western Australia, Art Gallery of New South Wales, the National Gallery of Australia and National Gallery of Victoria (NGV).

Mabel Juli, Shirley Purdie and Lena Nyadbi are particularly well-known names in the art world.

Other notable contemporary artists among the more than 60 artists at the centre include:

- Gordon Barney (husband of Shirley Purdie)
- Patrick Mung Mung
- Phyllis Thomas
- Churchill Cann
- Betty Carrington
- Madigan Thomas
- Phyllis Thomas (died 5 November 2018)
- Rammey Ramsey
- Evelyn Malgil
- Peggy Patrick
- Nancy Nodea
- Lorraine Daylight
- Tommy Carroll
- Mary Thomas (b. 1944)
