= Trevor Nickolls =

Aboriginal Australian artist

Trevor Nickolls (8 June 1949 – 29 September 2012) was a Ngarrindjeri Aboriginal Australian artist, known for his high-key acrylic paintings juxtaposing Western Desert 'dot-painting' and Arnhem Land 'cross-hatching' with western symbolism. He was recognised for the concurrent themes exploring industrial and spiritual societal experience, and European Australian and Indigenous Australian themes, which he referred to as "Machinetime and Dreamtime".

== Early life and education ==
Trevor Nickolls was born in 1949 in Port Adelaide, a suburb of Adelaide in the state of South Australia, Australia. He studied Western art theory and did not encountered traditional Aboriginal art in a meaningful way until his post-graduate degree at the Victorian College of the Arts in the late 1970s. He met Warlpiri artist Dinny Nolan Tjampitjinpa, a member of the influential Papunya school, and travelled throughout Arnhem Land, gaining practical experience of links between life, culture and land. He described the experience saying:

"I was right in it. It wraps itself around you, full of spirit, the space, the Dreaming, imagining how it was once."

== Artist ==
In 1990 he became the first Aboriginal Australian to be exhibited in the Australian Pavilion at the Venice Biennale alongside Rover Thomas.

In 2013 he posthumously won the Blake Prize for his work Metamorphosis.
