= Hector Jandany =

Australian artist (c. 1927–2006)

Hector Jandany (c. 1927–10 September 2006) was an Australian painter and a representative of Aboriginal art.

== Life ==
He was born in 1929 in Warmun (Turkey Creek). His father died when he was still very young, but his mother got remarried soon after. When he was about 10 years old, he went with his relatives to Argyle to see his father's country. Jandany stayed there with his relatives for a long time and worked as a stockman for some time . He eventually changed a lot of jobs, working on the Texas Downs station and as a cook. His position as a chairman at the school of Warmun had an important impact on his life. There, he tried to reinforce the teaching of the local culture, which had a strong impact into the school.

== Art ==
Jandany's art is strongly influenced by his personal experiences as well as the Aboriginal tradition. Thus, his mother's country is a constant motif in his paintings. He also often paints traditional dreaming stories from the Ngarrgoorroon country. He is particularly known for using earth tones and for his restrained use of colour. He has participated in numerous exhibitions since 1990.

== Sources ==
- Useful information about Jandany and pictures of his paintings at Short Street Gallery
- Similar content in Art Place site
- Hector Chundaloo Jandany, c. 1927-2006
