= Gija people =

Aboriginal Australians of Western Australia

Gija, also spelt Gidja and Kija, alternatively known as the Lungga, (Note: This is the term used by the ethnographer Phyllis Kaberry in her 1930s studies.) refers to Aboriginal Australians from the East Kimberley area of Western Australia, about 200 kilometres (120 mi) south of Kununurra. In the late 19th century pastoralists were fiercely resisted by Gija people, many of whom now live around localities such as Halls Creek and Warmun (also known as Turkey Creek).

== Language ==
Gija does not belong to the Pama-Nyungan language family which covers most Australian Aboriginal tongues, but is a member of the small Jarrakan language group. It is still spoken by from 100 to 200 people.

A Gija-English dictionary was published in 2022, while a book of Gija terms for the plants and animals encountered and used by Gija people was published in 2018.

== Country ==
The Gija's traditional territory consisted of an estimated 32,000 square kilometres (12,500 mi^{2}), on Salmond, Chamberlain, and Wilson rivers. The western boundary ran up to the foothills of the Bluff Face Range. They also lived and hunted around the upper Margaret River, above the Ramsay Range gorge. Their easternmost lands ran as far as Halls Creek and Alice Downs. Sites associated with the Gija are Macphee Creek, as far north as Sugarloaf Hill, the Durack Range, Lissadell and Turkey Creek Station, Fig Tree Pool and the headwaters of Stony River.

== Massacres ==
In July 1886, during the Kimberley gold rush, a group of prospectors conducted a punitive expedition against the Gija in response to the spearing death of miner Fred Marriot. A contemporary diary entry by New Zealand prospector George Hales recorded that the prospectors "bailed up a large number of blacks in a gully who showed fight, they proceeded to slaughter them with repeating rifles" and that "a great many were killed, some say at least a hundred". Oral history accounts from Gija sources agree that a large-scale massacre took place at a site known as Spear Gully and suggest that Marriot was killed for abducting a woman or providing poisoned flour.

The last known massacre of the Gija people took place at Bedford Downs Station in 1924, when, according to Gija tradition, Paddy Quilty and others at the Bedford station took tribesmen off the station and fed them food laced with strychnine. The corpses of those killed were then heaped up and burnt on a funeral pyre to eliminate traces of the killings.

== Modern period ==
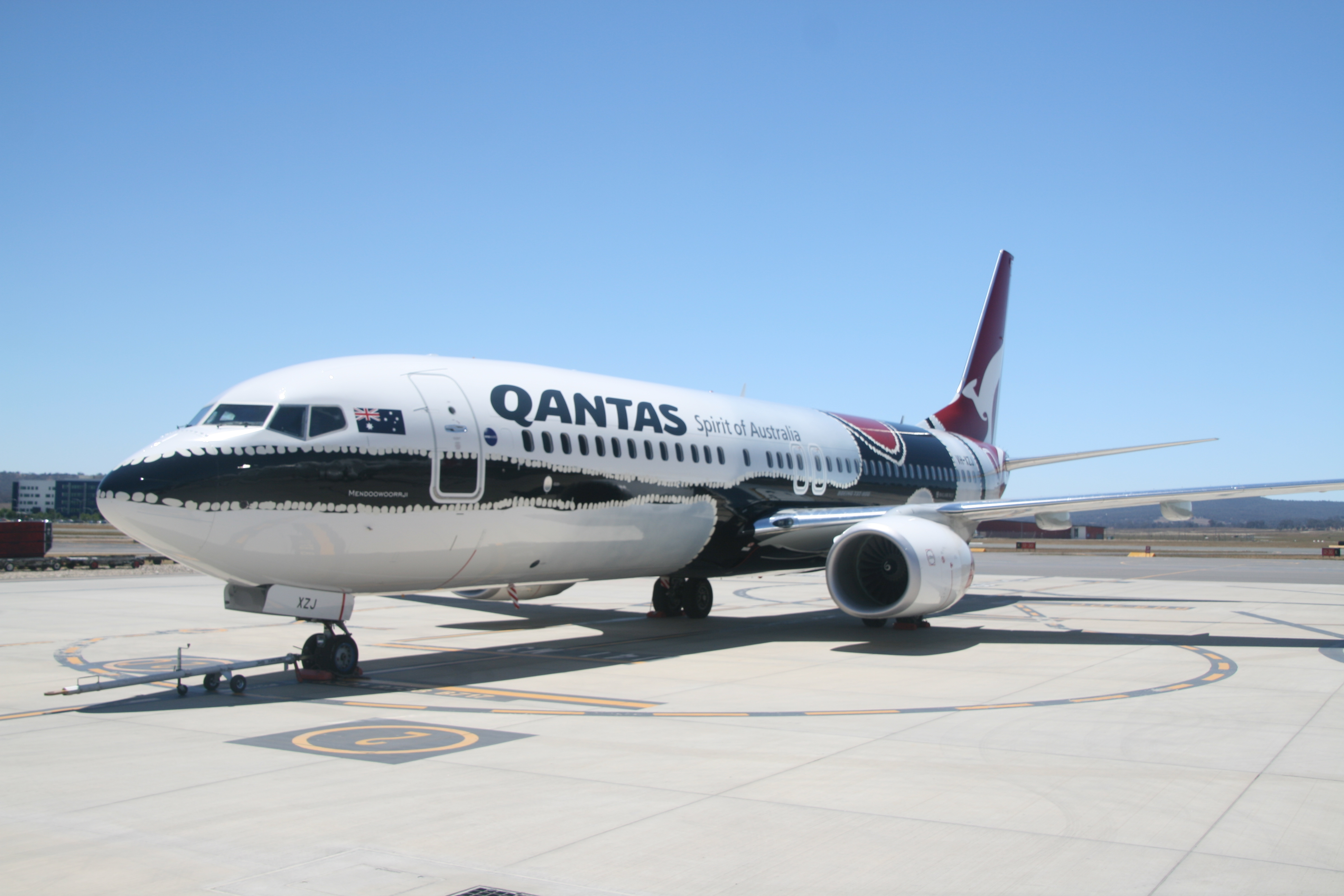
Qantas Boeing 737 with "Mendoowoorrji" paint scheme, inspired by Paddy Bedford's artwork "Medicine Pocket", itself inspired by the region inhabited by the Gija people

In 1979, mining explorations teams discovered pink and reddish diamonds, quite rare at the time, at Smoke Creek and at Barramundi Gap, a key site in Gija female dreaming. Subsequently the Argyle diamond mine was established. Employment of local people remained low, 10% in 2003, when strategies changed. Now a quarter of the workforce is recruited from local indigenous people.

The Gija have maintained a strong tradition of cultural preservation and active programs include a repository of teaching materials and artwork. Qantas adapted Paddy Bedford's artwork for use on a Boeing 737.

== Notable people ==
- Paddy Bedford (1922–2007), Gija artist
- Josie Farrer, Australian parliamentarian. Member of the Legislative Assembly of Western Australia since 2013, representing the seat of Kimberley.
- Stacy Mader, the first Aboriginal Australian to obtain a PhD in astronomy.
- Lena Nyadbi, Gija artist whose works on barramundi scale designs have been exhibited in Paris, notable on the roof of the Musee du Quai Branly, and only viewable from the Eiffel Tower. The work was commissioned by the Museum; Nyadbi's design represents the dreaming story of the barramundi, eluding capture to shed its scales across the landscape. The scales are metaphors for the pink Argyle diamonds, now mined by Rio Tinto on Gija land. With the positioning on the rooftop, Nyadbi's intent was to have the barramundi appear poised to flip back into the Seine.

== Sources ==
- Ferrell, Robyn (2012). Sacred Exchanges: Images in Global Context. Columbia University Press. ISBN 978-0-231-14880-1.
- Kaberry, Phyllis M. (June 1935). "The Forrest River and Lyne River Tribes of North-West Australia: A Report on Field Work". Oceania. 5 (4): 408–436. doi:10.1002/j.1834-4461.1935.tb00163.x. JSTOR 40327811.
- Kaberry, Phyllis M. (June 1937). "Subsections in the East and South Kimberley Tribes of North-West Australia". Oceania. 7 (4): 436–458. doi:10.1002/j.1834-4461.1937.tb00397.x. JSTOR 40327647.
- McGregor, William B. (2013). The Languages of the Kimberley, Western Australia. Routledge. ISBN 978-1-134-39602-3.
- Miller, Nick (7 June 2013). "Dreamtime art celebrated on rooftops of Paris". The Sydney Morning Herald.
- "Paris museum to host rooftop Aboriginal artwork". Australian Broadcasting Commission. 29 April 2013.
- Shirley Purdie; Peggy Patrick; Lena Nyadbi; et al. (2018). Gija Plants and Animals: Aboriginal Flora and Fauna Knowledge from the east Kimberley, north Australia. Northern Territory Botanical Bulletin. Vol. 47. Batchelor: Batchelor Press. ISBN 978-1-74350-130-6. OCLC 1066318745. S2CID 155990126. Wikidata Q109466091.
- Tasker, Sarah-Jane (31 March 2012). "Pink diamonds still Argyle's best friend". The Australian.
- Thomas, Geoffrey (9 November 2013). "Qantas unveils aircraft's Aboriginal art". The West Australian.
- Tindale, Norman Barnett (1974). "Kitja (WA)". Aboriginal Tribes of Australia: Their Terrain, Environmental Controls, Distribution, Limits, and Proper Names. Canberra: Australian National University. ISBN 978-0-708-10741-6. LCCN 75516991. OCLC 3052288. OL 4795942M. Wikidata Q128257949. Archived from the original on 20 March 2020.
- Kofod, Frances Mary; Eileen Bray; Rusty Peters; Joe Blythe; Anna Crane (2022). Gija dictionary. Canberra: Aboriginal Studies Press. ISBN 978-1-922752-11-6. Wikidata Q131317487.
