= Queenie McKenzie =

Australian artist (c. 1915–1998)

- Born: Mingmarriya circa 1915; Old Texas Station, East Kimberley, Western Australia, Australia
- Died: 16 November 1998 (aged 82–83); Warmun (Turkey Creek), East Kimberley, Western Australia, Australia
- Other names: Garagarag, Mingmarriya, Queenie Nakarra, Gara-garag
- Known for: Painting, contemporary Indigenous Australian art

Queenie McKenzie (Nakarra) (formerly Oakes, or Mingmarriya) (c. 1915 – 16 November 1998) was an Aboriginal Australian artist. She was born on Old Texas Station, on the western bank of the Ord River in the East Kimberley.

== Early life ==
McKenzie's mother was Malngin and Gurundji and her father was a white horse-breaker.

Under the existing policy during the time of her youth, McKenzie was at risk of removal by the government to an institution, as was the fate of many Aboriginal children with mixed parentage at the time. The government policy at the time (which lasted until 1970) sought to institutionalize mixed-race children. Her mother, however, prevented the displacement of her child by reportedly blackening her skin with charcoal, and the young girl grew up working for the stockmen of the cattle station at Texas Downs. She grew up amongst the Gija people and Gija was her first language.

McKenzie was an advocate and a healer while serving as a camp cook at the station and befriended Rover Thomas in the 1980s. One time, Thomas was thrown off his horse which trampled him, tearing his scalp and Mckenzie sewed it back together.

Mckenzie was inspired by Thomas and began learning to paint. Although she never received any formal training, Thomas encouraged her as she painted landscape paintings of the station. However, in the 1970s, Aboriginal workers on big cattle stations were laid off, and so Mckenzie with her husband, Charlie, settled in Warmun. Before they were forced to leave, Aboriginal people were unable to access their ancestral lands where the station was and Mckenzie went to the State Parliament in Perth to fight for this right. In the Warmun community, other prominent artists emerged such as Hectoro Jandany, George Mung Mung, Jack Britten, Paddy Jaminji, and Hector Chundaloo.

McKenzie lived her entire life in the Shire of Wyndham-East Kimberley, knew the landscape intimately, and is quoted as saying: "Every rock, every hill, every water, I know that place backwards and forwards, up and down, inside out. It's my country and I got names for every place". McKenzie took two Aboriginal names, once stating, "my name been grow up from these hills". Mingmarriya references the country near Dingo Springs on Texas Downs Station east of Warmun (Turkey Creek), Western Australia where the artist lived and painted.

== Career ==
After many years of ceremony painting, her skills improved. She enjoyed using natural ochres that came from the land of Warmun including reds, whites, browns, blacks, and yellows. Pink was her favourite colour and she incorporated that into her work as well. She would use dots and large areas of flat colour to create them, and her paintings had narrative meaning and symbolism behind them. Her paintings depicted the landscape of the Warmun region and its ceremonies during the 1970s. She constructed her paintings with hills and ridges approaching a horizon and the key landmarks of the region were characterized by the ochres she chose to represent each hill and tree to give them meaning. Not only did she do landscape paintings, but she also depicted events that affected her community such as Blackfella Massacre which shows an incident between the police and Aboriginal people in 1922, along with "Living with Alcohol" in 1994. Other examples that allude to important events include The Horse Creek Massacre and The Great Flood of 1922. Over 154 works, her most famous pieces include Texas Downs, Balinji, My country- Texas Downs which highlights her landscape pieces. She also enjoyed painting owls which include pieces such as Mook Mook Owls with Young and Domboyn Owls.

In the 1980s, McKenzie became an important voice for women of the Warmun community and reintroduced the Women's Law which was a shelter that protected women from domestic violence. She also led a project supported by the Heritage Council of Western Australia to record mythological, historical, and women's ceremonial sites in the area to keep those stories alive for future generations. Mckenzie and her husband never had any children, but she helped raise many children in Warmun and taught Gija at the school.

McKenzie benefited from the Waringarri Aboriginal Arts Corporation. In 1993, former Arts Minister Peter Foss stated about the organization, "This organisation is doing an enormous amount to ensure that Aboriginal art is respected in terms of copyright and moral rights, and that Aboriginal artists are recompensed properly for their work".

A painting by McKenzie depicting the Mistake Creek massacre was bought by the National Museum of Australia in 2005, but due to controversy over the facts of the event, part of the History Wars, it had never been hung. From July 2020 it was put on display as part of a new exhibition titled "Talking Blak to History" at the Museum.

== Collections ==
- Art Gallery of New South Wales
- Art Gallery of Western Australia
- Holmes à Court Collection
- Kluge-Ruhe Aboriginal Art Collection of the University of Virginia
- National Gallery of Australia

== Commercial success ==
McKenzie had her work shown in the first major showing of Kimberley, Images of Power, at the National Gallery of Victoria in 1993. In April 1994, McKenzie, with other Aboriginal women, had an exhibition titled Bush Women at Fremantle Arts Centre.

In 1995, she had her first solo exhibition titled Gara-Garag: My Life Longa Texas premiered in Waringarri Aboriginal Arts at William Mora Galleries. She also created her first prints in 1995 with Frank Gohier at the Northern Territory University Printmaking Workshop in Darwin, which were selected for the Fremantle Print Award. Also in 1995, Mckenzie's work was featured in The National Women's Art Exhibition at Hogarth Galleries.

In 1998 she was chosen to create fine art prints for the 2000 Sydney Olympics commemoration of Australian culture.

She established the very first community-owned art centre for Gija artists in August 1998 for Warmun artists which is called Warmun Art Centre. Later in 2004, she was included in exhibition at the AAMU Museum of Contemporary Aboriginal Art in Utrecht, Explained II, A Closer Look at Aboriginal Art.

McKenzie's art remains among Australia's most collectible. Her works have sold at auction for $8000 to $92000. McKenzie has also been consistently included within the Australian Indigenous Art Market top 100 index, ranking 21st in 2014.

Her works are held in the National Gallery of Australia, the National Gallery of Victoria, the Art Gallery of South Australia and Art Gallery of Western Australia, among others.

== Legacy ==
Throughout the final years of McKenzie's life, the artist exhibited concern for the cultural future of her community, and wished for the Texas Downs station to be returned to the Texas Mob. Though she died before witnessing her wishes manifest, McKenzie's importance has been recognised by the government of Western Australia, which declared her as a "State Living Treasure" the year of her death.

McKenzie was included in the Moorditj-Australian Indigenous Cultural Expressions CD-ROM, along with other Western Australian artists Jack Davis, Alma Toomath, Betty Egan, Michele Broun, the Pigram Brothers, Footprince, Wayne Barker, Sally Morgan, Jimmy Chi and Mary Pantjiti McLean.

In Western Australia, all pastoral land leases are up for renewal or surrender in 2015, including the Texas Downs station.

McKenzie was cited as an important influence on the work of the Australian ceramic artist Pippin Drysdale. She died on 16 November 1998, in Western Australia.
