= Rover Thomas =

Indigenous Australian artist (1926–1998)

- Born: 1926; Western Australia, Australia
- Died: 11 April 1998 (aged 71–72); Warmun (Turkey Creek), East Kimberley, Western Australia, Australia
- Other names: Roba, Juluma, Joowoorroo/Juwurru
- Occupations: Stockman, artist
- Known for: Painting
- Notable work: 'All That Big Rain Coming from the Top Side' (1991)'Railway Bridge, Katherine' (1984), 'Bedford Downs Massacre' (1985), 'Two men dreaming' (1985), 'The Story of Owl (Dumbiny)' (1988), 'Yari country' (1989), 'Barramundi Dreaming' (1989), 'Cyclone Tracy' (1991).
- Relatives: Nyuju Stumpy Brown (sister)

Rover Thomas Joolama (c.1926 – 11 April 1998), commonly known as simply Rover Thomas, was a Wangkajunga and Kukatja Aboriginal Australian artist.

== Early life ==
Rover Thomas was born in 1925 near Gunawaggii, at Well 33 on the Canning Stock Route, in the Great Sandy Desert of Western Australia. At the age of 10 Thomas and his family moved to the Kimberley where, as was usual at the time, he began work as a stockman. Later in his life Thomas lived at Turkey Creek.

Rover Thomas and his Uncle Paddy Jaminji first started painting dance boards on dismembered tea chests for the Krill Krill ceremony in 1977. Thomas was inspired to paint by a mystical experience of being visited by his deceased kinship mother after the disaster of Cyclone Tracy, which he interpreted as a warning against the decline of Indigenous cultural practices. The Krill Krill ceremony included dances, songs and the painted boards tracing the woman's after-life journey from her death near Derby back to the place of her birth near Turkey Creek. He would return to the theme of Cyclone Tracy in a later work now in the National Gallery of Australia collection.

== East Kimberley School ==
In the early 1980s, Rover Thomas started painting ochre on canvas and soon became a pioneer artist of what was later known as the East Kimberley School.

One series of paintings from this time depicted massacre sites from the frontier wars in the Kimberley. Notable works include 'Bedford Downs Massacre' and 'Camp at Mistake Creek'. A National Gallery of Victoria curator noted the works dual roles as history painting and landscape painting:

While these images describe actual events of cultural and social importance as remembered and passed down in oral history; they are at the same time, superb planer constructions of colour and form as in the dominant, central black shape and contrasting 'country' of Lake Paruku.

Thomas likened the works of American abstract expressionist Mark Rothko to his own work saying: 'That bugger paints like me!’.

Rover Thomas was inspired by many East Kimberley artists who heed follow including Queenie McKenzie, Freddie Timms and Paddy Bedford

== Exhibitions ==
He was the subject of the important solo exhibition Roads Cross: The Paintings of Rover Thomas, National Gallery of Australia, Canberra in 1994.

In 2000, Thomas's work was among that of eight individual and collaborative groups of Indigenous Australian artists shown in the prestigious Nicholas Hall at the Hermitage Museum in Russia. The exhibition received a positive reception from Russian critics, one of whom wrote:

This is an exhibition of contemporary art, not in the sense that it was done recently, but in that it is cased in the mentality, technology and philosophy of radical art of the most recent times. No one, other than the Aborigines of Australia, has succeeded in exhibiting such art at the Hermitage.

== Awards and recognition ==
In 1990 Thomas was awarded the John McCaughey Prize at the Art Gallery of New South Wales.

In 1990 he became the first Aboriginal Australian to exhibit in the Venice Biennale, alongside Trevor Nickolls.

== Collections ==
Thomas' work is held in many major collections, including:

- Art Gallery of New South Wales, Sydney
- Art Gallery of South Australia, Adelaide
- Art Gallery of Western Australia, Perth
- Berndt Museum of Anthropology, University of Western Australia
- Holmes à Court Collection, Perth, WA
- The Kelton Foundation, Santa Monica, California, U.S.
- Museum and Art Gallery of the Northern Territory, Darwin, Northern Territory
- National Gallery of Australia, Canberra
- National Gallery of Victoria, Melbourne
- Queensland Art Gallery, Brisbane

== See also ==
- Indigenous Australian art

== Bibliography ==
- McAlpine, Lord Alistair (2002). Adventures of a Collector. Allen and Unwin. ISBN 1-86508-786-6.
- Van Den Bosch, Annette (2005). Australian Art World: Aesthetics in a Global Market. Allen and Unwin. ISBN 1-74114-455-8.
