= List of Indigenous Australian art movements and cooperatives =

Australian Indigenous art movements and cooperatives have been central to the emergence of Indigenous Australian art. Whereas many western artists pursue formal training and work as individuals, most contemporary Indigenous art is created in community groups and art centres.

Indigenous art centres put high value on social inclusion; they support major artists and foster emerging ones; they encourage participation and professional development of young people as artists or related workers, to provide employment and income. They focus on community rather than the art market: family connection, along with activities that celebrate Aboriginal and help to protect culture.

The cooperatives or art centres listed below reflect the diversity of art across Indigenous Australia, where art, particularly for remote communities, is a significant source of income and livelihood.

== Peak groups ==
The following organisations represent, or include, a number of Indigenous art cooperatives:

=== Aboriginal Art Association of Australia ===
The Aboriginal Art Association of Australia (AAAA), which advocates for all industry participants, including artists, galleries, and dealers, whether independent or affiliated to an art centre, was founded in Alice Springs (Mparntwe) in November 1998 and incorporated in January 1999, with over 60 financial member organisations during its first year. The Association continues to lobby and inform governments on behalf of its members on a range of matters, including the future direction and development of the arts (particularly Indigenous); codes of conduct, and resale royalties.

Art curator and dealer Adam Knight was formerly the vice president of the AAAA. He took over as president of the organisation in 2018.

=== Arnhem, Northern and Kimberley Artists ===
The Arnhem, Northern and Kimberley Artists, Aboriginal Corporation (ANKA) is the peak body for Aboriginal artists and Aboriginal-owned community art centres across around a million square kilometres in the Top End of the Northern Territory and Western Australia. It is a not-for-profit Aboriginal Corporation.

The organisation was founded as the Association of Northern, Central and Arnhem Aboriginal Artists (ANCAAA) in 1987, which covered art centres in Northern and Central Australia; however in 1992 a separate association for the central regions was created, known as Desart, while ANCAAA continued to support artists in Northern Australia. In 1995, renamed Association of Northern, Kimberley and Arnhem Aboriginal Artists (ANKAAA), the requirement for all Indigenous governance was formalised at a board meeting, with a new all-Indigenous board elected from the four regions: Arnhem Land, the Kimberley, Darwin/Katherine, and the Tiwi Islands.

In 2000 the association undertook a strategic planning process and the new name (ANKA) was adopted. As of 2020 ANKA represents nearly 50 Aboriginal-owned remote community art centres, and more than 5000 artists.

The head office of ANKA is in Darwin.

=== Desart ===
Desart was founded in 1992 as a split from ANCAAA, to focus on Central Desert artists, and incorporated in 1993. In 2016, it represented over 8000 artists. In 2021, it had 37 independent Central Australian Aboriginal art centres, representing over 11,000 artists, located in the southern part of the Northern Territory, the APY Lands of South Australia, and Ngaanyatjarra country in Western Australia. Desart is governed by an all-Aboriginal committee elected by the members. As of January 2024 it has 30 member centres.

In 2022, Desart took on management responsibilities, being fully Aboriginal-owned for the first time in that year. In April 2022 Philip Watkins, CEO of Desart, was appointed for a three year term to the board of the Australia Council, the chief arts funding body of the federal government. In September 2024 he was appointed co-chair, with Rachael Maza, of First Nations Arts, a newly-established division of the Australia Council focused on Aboriginal and Torres Strait Islander arts, for a term of four years.

The functions of Desart include advocacy for the art centres, and delivering "programs that build strong business practice, improve infrastructure, support governance, and promote Aboriginal art and culture".

Desart also runs "Desert Mob", an annual event occurring each September or October that includes an exhibition in Araluen Arts Centre in Mparntwe (Alice Springs), the Desert Mob Symposium, a marketplace, demonstrations, and other events such as workshops and visits to studios and art centres. The 32nd edition of Desert Mob in 2023 included artwork from 35 art centres, curated by Hetti Kemarr Perkins and Aspen Nampin Beattie. There were also short films from Tjanpi Desert Weavers, and fashion shows.

== Indigenous art movements and cooperatives ==
There is a wide range of art centres. They are all Indigenous-owned and/or controlled and are all not-for-profit organisations or, in a few cases, companies owned by the artists (Papunya Tula; Jirrawun Arts). The oldest is Ernabella Arts, formed in 1948. The largest by sales in 2006 were Papunya Tula and Warlayirti.

Name of centre	Location or nearest town	Year established	Major artists associated with centre
Aboriginal Australia Art & Culture	Alice Springs, Northern Territory	1973	
Araluen Arts Centre	Alice Springs, NT		
Artists of Ampilatwatja	Ampilatwatja, NT	1999	
Barkly Regional Arts	Tennant Creek, NT		Artists of the Barkly, a collective representing 50+ artists in Tennant Creek, Wutunugurra (Epenarra), Owairtilla (Canteen Creek), Kulumindini (Elliott), and Mungkarta (McLaren Creek)
Bima Wear	Nguiu, Bathurst Island, Tiwi Islands, NT	1969	
Boomalli Aboriginal Artists Co-operative	Sydney, NSW	1987	Bronwyn Bancroft, Michael Riley, Harry Wedge
Buku-Larrnggay Mulka Centre	Yirrkala, NT	1976	
Bula'Bula Arts	Ramingining, Central Arnhem Land, NT	1990	
Elcho Island Arts	Elcho Island, NT	1992	
Ernabella Arts	Pukatja, South Australia	1948	
Hermannsburg Potters	Hermannsburg, NT	1990	
Ikuntji	Haast's Bluff, NT	1992	Daisy Jugadai Napaltjarri, Molly Jugadai Napaltjarri
Injalak Arts	Gunbalanya, NT	1989	Lofty Bardayal Nadjamerrek, Jimmy Namarnyilk, England Banggala, Glen Namundja, Graham Badari, Gabriel Maralngurra, Isaiah Nagurrgurrba
Iwantja Arts	Anangu Pitjantjatjara Lands, South Australia	1995	Vincent Namatjira
Jirrawun Arts	Wyndham, Western Australia	not known	Paddy Bedford, Freddy Timms
Kaltjiti Arts	Fregon	2013	
Keringke Arts	Santa Teresa, Northern Territory	1989	
Mangkaja	Fitzroy Crossing, Western Australia	early 1980s	
Maningrida Arts & Culture	Maningrida, Northern Territory	c.1966	John Mawurndjul
Maruku Arts	Uluru, NT	1984	
Mimi Aboriginal Art and Craft	Katherine, NT	1978	Bill Yidumduma Harney
Mimili Maku Arts	Mimili	SA	
Minyma Kutjara Arts Project	Irrunytju (Wingellina)	2001 (formerly Irrunytju Arts)	Yannima Tommy Watson
Papunya Tjupi Arts	Papunya	NT	
Papunya Tula	NT	1972	Anatjari Tjakamarra, Eileen Napaltjarri, Tjunkiya Napaltjarri, Makinti Napanangka, Pansy Napangardi, Timmy Payungka Tjapangati, Clifford Possum Tjapaltjarri, Doreen Reid Nakamarra, Billy Stockman Tjapaltjarri
ProppaNOW	Brisbane, Queensland	2002	Richard Bell, Vernon Ah Kee, Megan Cope, Jennifer Herd, Tony Albert, Gordon Hookey
Spinifex Arts Project	Tjuntjuntjarra	NT	
Titjikala	Titjikala, Northern Territory	not known	
Tjanpi Desert Weavers	Central Australia (NT, SA, WA)	1995	
Tiwi Designs	Tiwi Islands, NT	1968	
Tiwi Island Artists	Tiwi Islands, NT	1998	
Tjala Arts	Amata, SA	1997	
Tjanpi Desert Weavers	Alice Springs, NT		
Utopia	Alice Springs, NT	1985	Abie Loy Kemarre, Emily Kame Kngwarreye, Kudditji Kngwarreye, Betty Mbitjana, Gloria Petyarre, Kathleen Petyarre, Greeny Purvis Petyarre (c. 1930–2010, husband of Kathleen), Angelina Pwerle, Jeannie Mills Pwerle, Lena Pwerle, (born c. 1934), Minnie Pwerle
Utopia Art Centre	Urapuntja (Utopia), NT	2020	
Waralungku Arts	Borroloola, NT	2003	
Waringarri Aboriginal Arts	Kununurra, Western Australia	early 1980s	
Warlayirti Artists	Balgo, Western Australia	1987	Susie Bootja Bootja Napaltjarri, Takariya Napaltjarri, Topsy Gibson Napaljarri, Helicopter Tjungurrayi
Warlukurlangu Artists	Yuendumu, NT	1985	Sheila Brown Napaljarri, Helen Nelson Napaljarri, Norah Nelson Napaljarri, Shorty Jangala Robertson, Liddy Walker, Dorothy Napangardi, Paddy Japanangka Lewis, Paddy Japaljarri Sims, Paddy Japaljarri Stewart, Mary Anne Nampijinpa Michaels
Warmun Art Centre	Warmun (Turkey Creek, Western Australia)	1998	Shirley Purdie
Yarrenyty Arltere Artists	Alice Springs, NT	2008	Shirley Purdie
