= Kathleen Ngale =

Australian Aboriginal artist (c. 1930 – 2021)

Kathleen Ngale (alternative spellings include Kngale, Kngala, Kngal, Ngala etc.) is a senior Australian Aboriginal artist, born c. 1930 in the Utopia region of Central Australia. She died in 2021. Kathleen Ngale belongs to the oldest-living generation of Utopia artists and has been compared to Emily Kngwarreye, Minnie Pwerle and Kathleen Petyarre.

== Life ==
Kathleen Ngale was born around 1930 at the Camel Camp Station, 250 km north-east of Alice Springs, where she still lives with her extended family. She started working in Batik in 1979 and pursued her work in that medium until she, along with many other Aboriginal artists, was introduced in the late 1980s to painting in acrylic colours on canvas. Her work since then has come to be seen as some of the most sophisticated and complex in the Aboriginal art scene. She has been featured in many exhibitions, both in Australia and overseas, and she was a finalist in the National Aboriginal and Torres Strait Islander Award in both 2000 and 2008. Kathleen Ngale is now the senior custodian of the cultural knowledge of her country, Arlparra. Her younger sisters Polly Ngale and Angelina Pwerle Ngale are also artists.

== Work ==
Kathleen Ngale's works are a depiction of her country, Arlparre, and its 'Bush Plum' (anwekety) Dreaming. Her paintings are made up of numerous layers of superimposed dots, creating a feeling of depth, light and movement. There is virtually as much hidden in these works as there is visible in a surface reading, with many underdotting colour planes shimmering through the top layers in a highly complex interplay. Her subtly dotted underpainting often consists of yellows, reds, purples, greens, over which she then often applies a thick layer of overdotting which almost obscures the underdotting altogether or fuses with it to create a surface of delicate, fragile colour softer than the original underdotting, red and white often fusing into a translucent, fleshy white/pink. The colour is often thickly applied or washed out, but then in the surface of the same canvas the overdotting can in some parts become very sparse, allowing the viewer to see down through the painting's surface into a field of deep or 'negative' space. Sasha Grishin, Sir William Dobell Professor of Art History at the Australian National University, wrote in 2009: "Although Kathleen Kngale has been painting for over two decades, it is only in recent years that she has been acclaimed as one of the most significant and exciting artists in contemporary Utopia painting, creating memorable and visually dazzling paintings... She is an artist who has created an [sic] unique and distinctive stylistic language, one of great visual power and spiritual resonance."

Her works (as well as those of her sister Polly, born c. 1940) have become sought after in recent years.

== Selected exhibitions ==
- 1992 Modern Art-Ancient Icon – The World Bank, Washington, US
- 2000 Urapunja artists in Brisbane, Micheal Sourgnes
- 2000 Out of the Desert, Desert Gallery – Sydney
- 2001 Utopia a Special Painting Place – Bett Gallery, Hobart, Tasmania
- 2002 Two sisters, Kathleen and Polly, Lorraine Diggins, Melbourne
- 2002 Australian Modern, Fondazione Mudima, Milan, Italy
- 2004-2006 ArtParis International Contemporary Art Fair, Grand Palais, Paris
- 2005 October Gallery, London
- 2006 Galerie Clément, Vevey, Switzerland
- 2006 Lorraine Diggins exhibition, London
- 2006 Senior Women of Utopia, GalleryG, Brisbane
- 2007 Patterns of Power, art from the Eastern Desert, Simmer on the Bay Gallery, Sydney
- 2008 Emily Kngwarreye and Her Legacy, Tokyo, Japan
- 2008 Galerie Brenart, 221 Avenue Louise, Bruxelles (Brussels), Belgium
- 2014 Visions of Utopia, Mitchell Fine Art, Brisbane
- 2017 Desert Dots II, Utopia Lane Gallery, Melbourne
- 2018 Beyond the Veil, Olsen Gruin Gallery, New York

== Selected collections ==
- National Gallery of Australia
- National Gallery of Victoria, Melbourne
- Thomas Vroom Collection, Utrecht, the Netherlands
- Holmas a Court Collection, Perth
