= Indigenous Australian art =

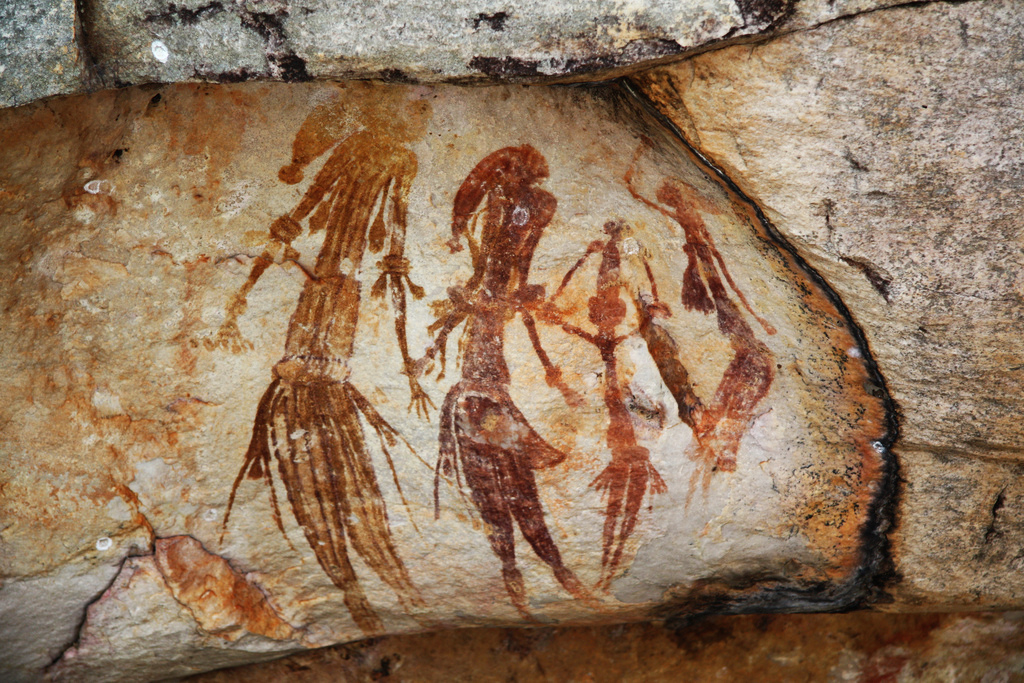
Gwion Gwion rock art found in the north-west Kimberley region of Western Australia

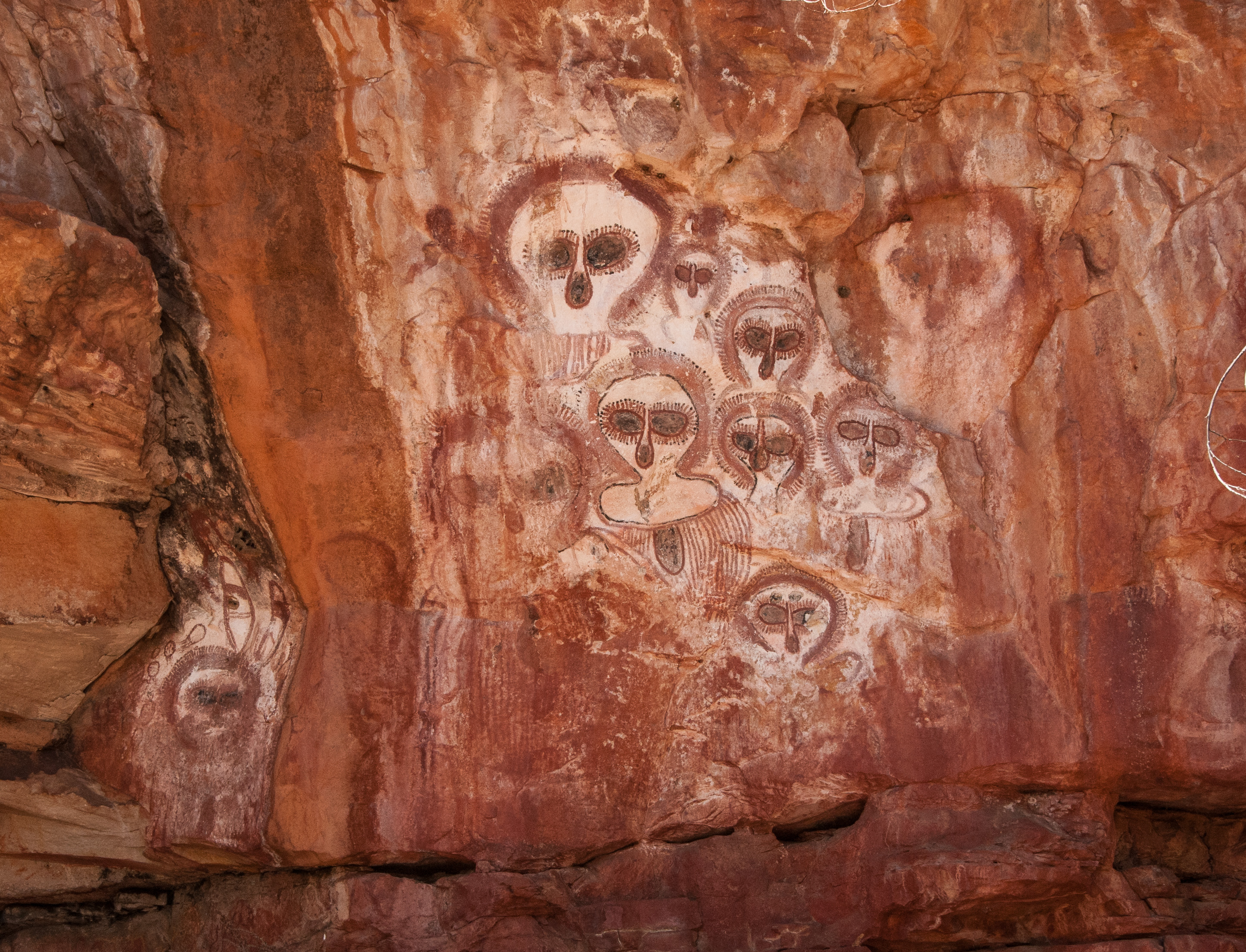
Pictographs known as Wandjina in the Wunnumurra Gorge, Barnett River, Kimberley, Western Australia

Indigenous Australian art includes art made by Aboriginal Australians and Torres Strait Islanders, including collaborations with others. It includes works in a wide range of media including painting on leaves, bark painting, wood carving, rock carving, watercolour painting, sculpting, ceremonial clothing and sandpainting. The traditional visual symbols vary widely among the differing peoples' traditions, despite the common mistaken perception that dot painting is representative of all Aboriginal art.

== Traditional Aboriginal art ==
There are many types of and methods used in making Aboriginal art, including rock painting, dot painting, rock engravings, bark painting, carvings, sculptures, weaving, and string art. Australian Aboriginal art is the oldest unbroken tradition of art in the world.

=== Stone art ===
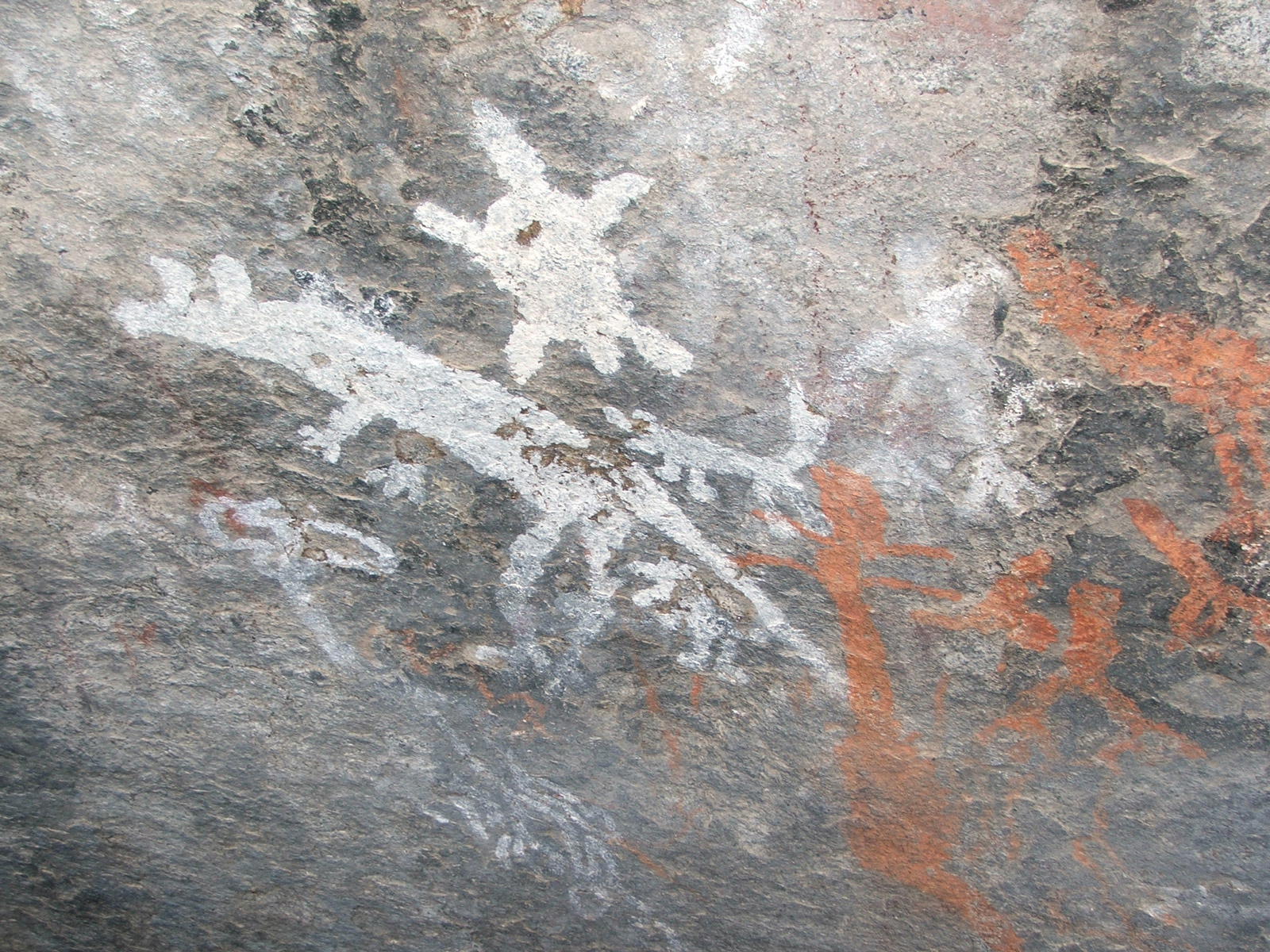
Aboriginal rock painting at Namadgi National Park featuring a kangaroo, dingoes, emus, humans and an echidna or turtle

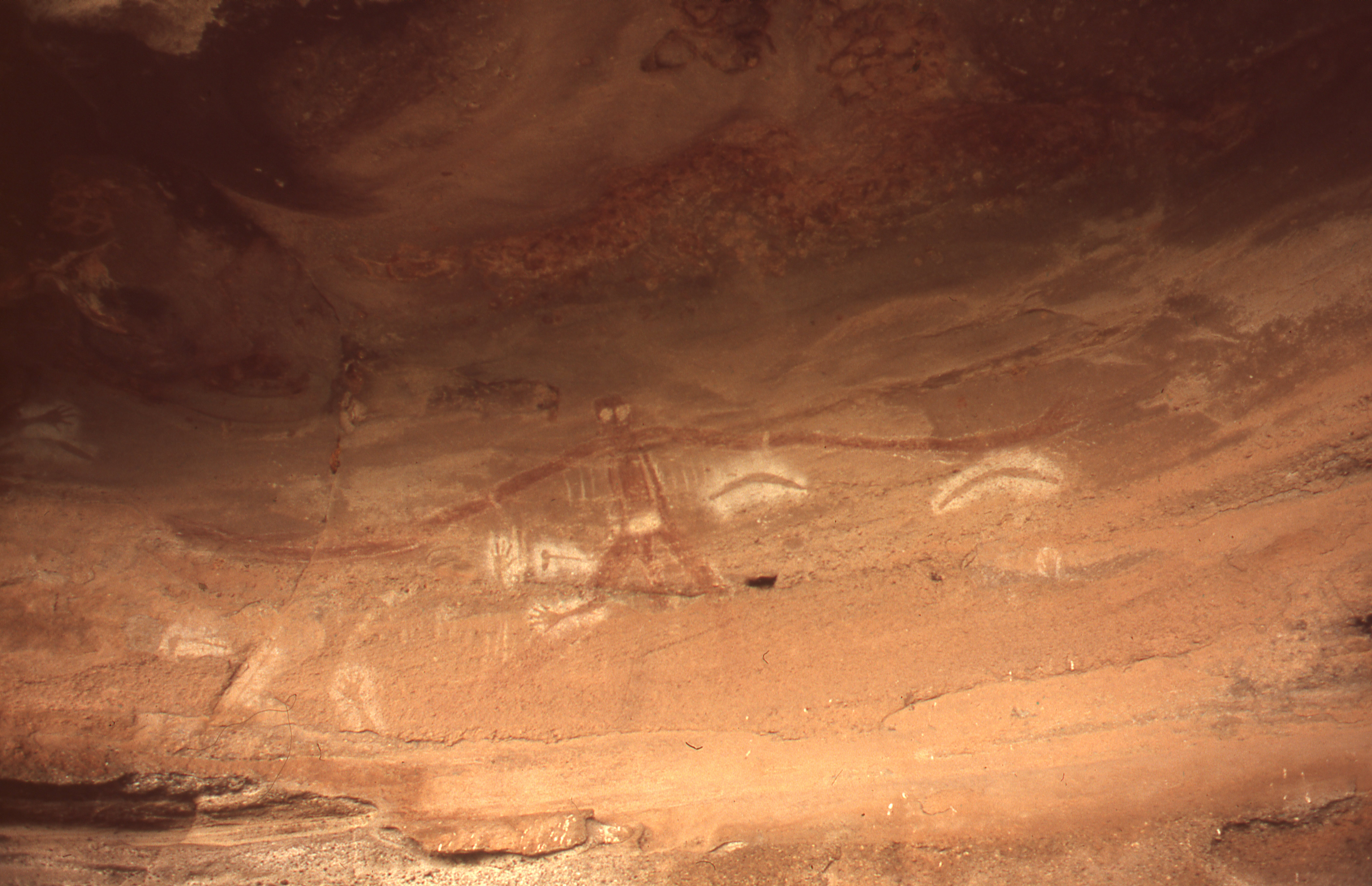
Painting of Baiame made by an unknown Wiradjuri artist in Baiame's cave, near Singleton, New South Wales. Notice the length of his arms which extend to the two trees either side.

Rock art, including painting and engraving or carving (petroglyphs), can be found at sites throughout Australia. Examples of rock art have been found that are believed to depict extinct megafauna such as Genyornis and Thylacoleo in the Pleistocene era as well as more recent historical events such as the arrival of European ships.

The oldest examples of rock art, in Western Australia's Pilbara region and the Olary district of South Australia, are estimated to be up to around 40,000 years old. The oldest firmly dated evidence of rock art painting in Australia is a charcoal drawing on a small rock fragment found during the excavation of the Narwala Gabarnmang rock shelter in south-western Arnhem Land in the Northern Territory. Dated at 28,000 years, it is one of the oldest known pieces of rock art on Earth with a confirmed date. It is thought this decorated fragment may have once formed part of a larger ceiling artwork, however, the shape of the original motif is unknown. The oldest reliably dated unambiguous, in-situ rock art motif in Australia is a large painting of a macropod from a rock shelter in Western Australia's Kimberley region, radiometrically dated in a February 2021 study at approximately 17,300 years old.

Gwion Gwion rock art (the "Bradshaw rock paintings", also referred to as Giro Giro"), initially named after Joseph Bradshaw, who first reported them in 1891, consists of a series of rock paintings on caves in the Kimberley region of Western Australia. A 2020 study puts this art at about 12,000 years old.

The Maliwawa Figures were documented in a study led by Paul Taçon and published in Australian Archaeology in September 2020. The art includes 572 images across 87 sites in northwest Arnhem Land, from Awunbarna (Mount Borradaile) area across to the Wellington Range. They are estimated to have been drawn between 6,000 and 9,400 years ago. The find is described as very rare, not only in style, but in their depiction of bilbies (not known historically in Arnhem Land) and the first known depiction of a dugong. The art, all paintings in red to mulberry colour apart from one drawing, and in a naturalistic style, had not been described in the literature before this study. They are large, and depict relationships between people and animals, a rare theme in rock art. Bilbies, thylacines and dugong have been extinct in Arnhem land for millennia. The art was first seen by the 2008-2009 researchers, but were only studied in field research lasting from 2016 to 2018. The figures were named by Ronald Lamilami, a senior traditional owner. According to Tacon, "The Maliwawa back-to-back figures are the oldest known for western Arnhem Land and it appears this painting convention began with the Maliwawa style. It continues to the present with bark paintings and paintings on paper". Taçon draws comparisons between the Maliwawa Figures and George Chaloupka's Dynamic Figures style, where the subject matter consists of about 89 percent humans, compared with 42% of the Maliwawa Figures. There is, however, much complexity and debate regarding the classification of rock art style in Arnhem Land.

Other painted rock art sites include Laura, Queensland, Ubirr, in the Kakadu National Park, Uluru, and Carnarvon Gorge.

Rock engraving, or petroglyphs, are created by methods which vary depending on the type of rock being used and other factors. There are several different types of rock art across Australia, the most famous of which is Murujuga in Western Australia, the Sydney rock engravings around Sydney in New South Wales, and the Panaramitee rock art in Central Australia. The Toowoomba engravings, depicting carved animals and humans, have their own peculiar style not found elsewhere in Australia.

The rock engravings at Murujuga are said to be the world's largest collection of petroglyphs and includes images of extinct animals such as the thylacine. Activity prior to the last ice age until colonisation is recorded.

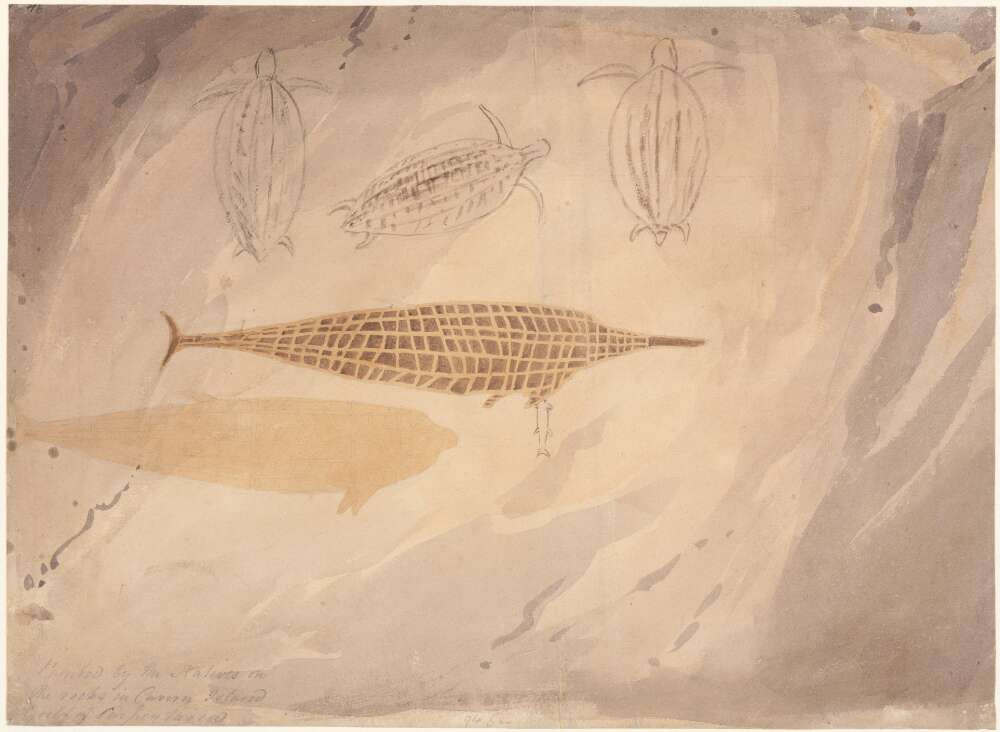
William Westall (1803) Chasm Island, native cave painting, 1803, watercolour

The first European discovery of Aboriginal rock paintings took place on 14 January 1803. During a surveying expedition along the shores and islands of the Gulf of Carpentaria, British navigator and explorer Matthew Flinders made landfall on Chasm Island.

Within the island's rock shelters, Flinders discovered an array of painted and stenciled patterns. To record these images, he enlisted the ship's artist, William Westall. Westall's two watercolour sketches are the earliest known documentation of Australian rock art.

=== Stone arrangements ===
Aboriginal stone arrangements are a form of rock art constructed by Aboriginal Australians. Typically they consist of stones, each of which may be about 30 cm in size, laid out in a pattern extending over several metres or tens of metres. Each stone is well-embedded into the soil, and many have "trigger-stones" to support them. Particularly fine examples are in the state of Victoria, where some examples have very large stones. For example, the stone arrangement at Wurdi Youang consists of about 100 stones arranged in an egg-shaped oval about 50 metres (160 ft) across. The appearance of the site is similar to that of the megalithic stone circles found throughout Britain (although the function and culture are presumably completely different). Although its association with Aboriginal Australians is well-authenticated and beyond doubt, the purpose is unclear, although it may have a connection with initiation rites. It has also been suggested that the site may have been used for astronomical purposes. Smaller stone arrangements are found throughout Australia, such as those near Yirrkala, which depict accurate images of the praus used by Macassan Trepang fishermen and spear throwers.

=== Wood carvings ===
Wood carving has long been an essential part of Aboriginal culture, requiring wood, sharp stone to carve, wire and fire. The wire and fire were used to create patterns on the object by heating the wire with the fire and placing it on the wood carving.

Wood carvings such as those by Central Australian artist Erlikilyika shaped like animals, were sometimes traded to Europeans for goods. The reason Aboriginal people made wood carvings was to help tell their Dreaming stories and pass on their group's lore and essential information about their country and customs. They were also used in ceremonies, such as the ilma.

Aboriginal people from the Tiwi Islands traditionally carved pukumani grave posts, and since the 1960s have been carving and painting iron wood figures.

=== Bark painting ===
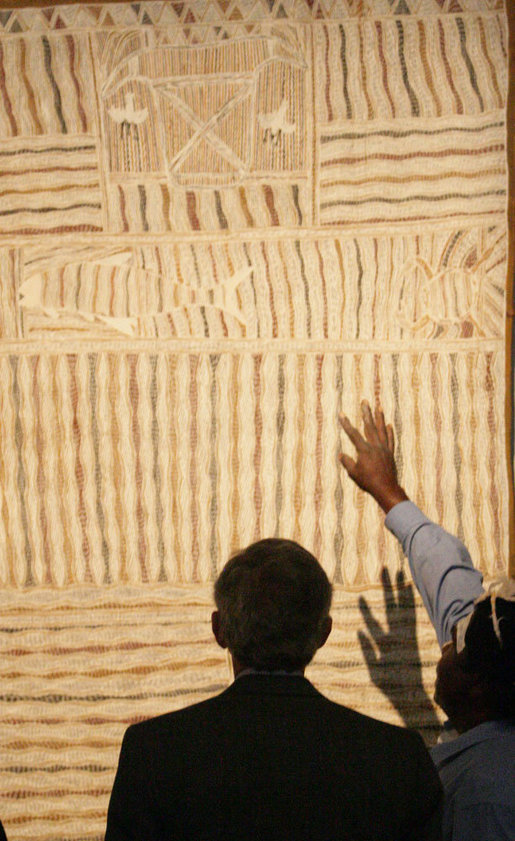
US President George W. Bush examines a Yirrkala bark painting at the Australian National Maritime Museum, 2007

Bark painting, where painting is done using ochres on the dried bark stripped off trees, is an old tradition. The earliest European find was in a shelter in Tasmania around 1800, and other painted bark shelters were found in Victoria and NSW. These were drawn with charcoal, and then painted or scratched onto bark which had been blackened by smoke. Painted bark baskets were used in death rituals on Melville and Bathurst Islands, and bark coffins and belts were painted in northeast Arnhem Land. Bark painting has continued into contemporary times.

Styles in bark painting in Northern Australia, especially in Arnhem Land, include cross-hatching, or rarrk, and x-ray style.

=== Baskets and weaving ===
Baskets, sometimes coiled baskets, were created by twisting bark, palm-leaf, and feathers; some of the baskets were plain and some were created with feather pendants or feathers woven in the frame of the basket. The artists used mineral and plant dyes to colour the palm-leaves and bark of the hibiscus. These string bags and baskets were used in ceremonies for religious and ritual needs; the baskets might have been also used for carry things back to the village.

Basket weaving has been traditionally practised by the women of many Aboriginal Australian peoples across the continent for centuries.

=== Jewellery ===
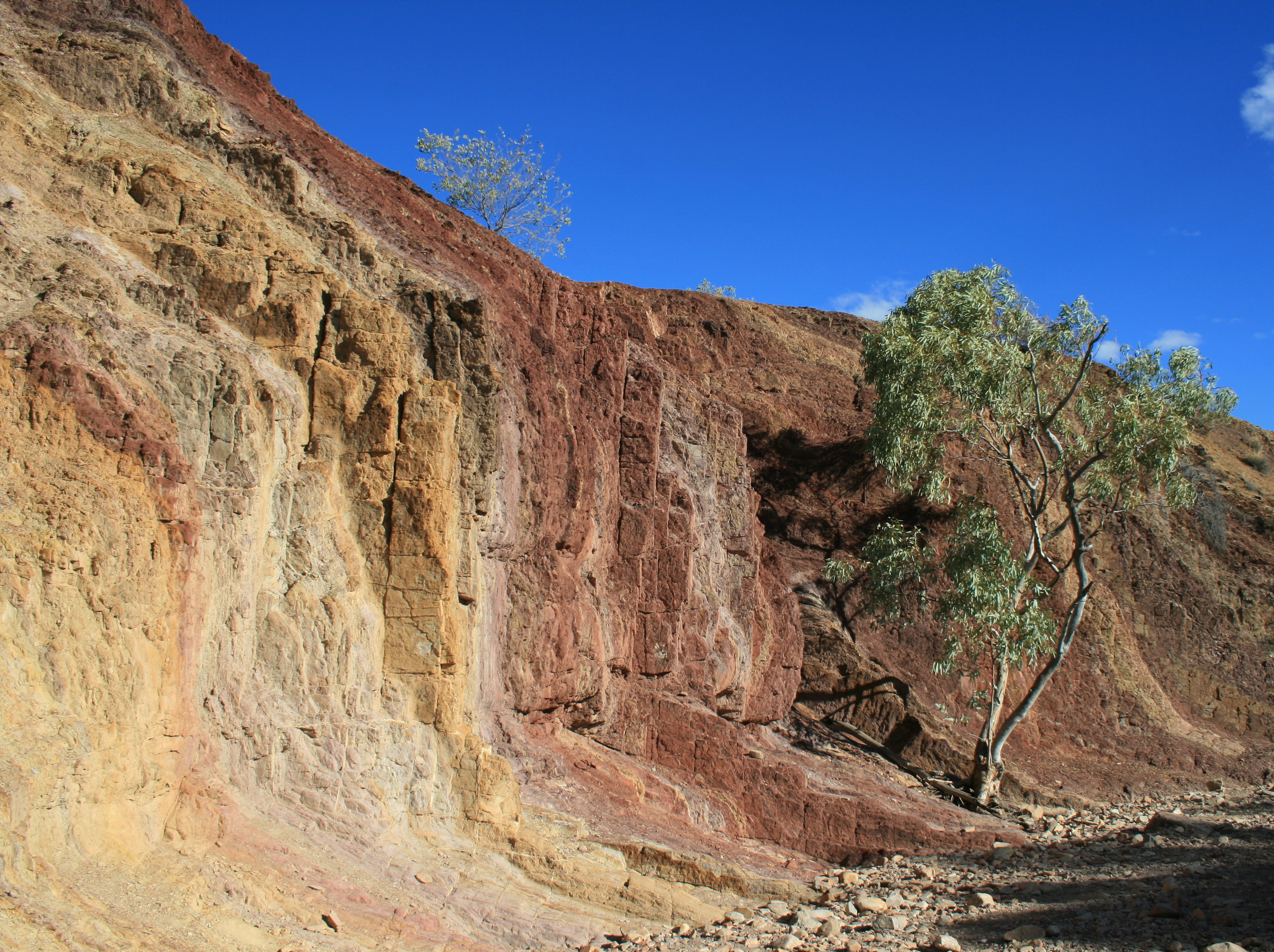
Ochre pits in central Australia where a variety of clay earth pigments were obtained

Aboriginal people created shell pendants which were considered high value and often used for trading goods. These shells were attached to string, which was handmade from human hair and sometimes covered with a type of grease and red ochre. This jewellery would sometimes be hung around a man's neck or waist for use during ceremonies.

=== Kalti paarti ===
Kalti paarti carving is a traditional art form made by carving emu eggs. It is not as old as some other techniques, having originated in the nineteenth century.

=== Symbols and sacred aspects ===
Certain symbols within the Aboriginal modern art movement retain the same meaning across regions, although the meaning of the symbols may change within the context of a painting. When viewed in monochrome other symbols can look similar, such as the circles within circles, sometimes depicted on their own, sparsely, or in clustered groups.

Many paintings by Aboriginal artists, such as those that represent a Dreaming story, are shown from an aerial perspective. The narrative follows the lie of the land, as created by ancestral beings in their journey or during creation. The modern-day rendition is a reinterpretation of songs, ceremonies, rock art, body art, and ceremonies (such as awelye) that was the norm for many thousands of years.

Whatever the meaning, interpretations of the symbols should be made in context of the entire painting, the region from which the artist originates, the story behind the painting, and the style of the painting.

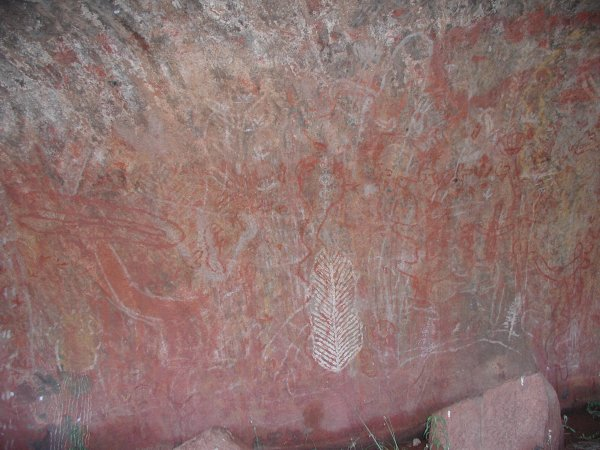
Aboriginal art at Uluru

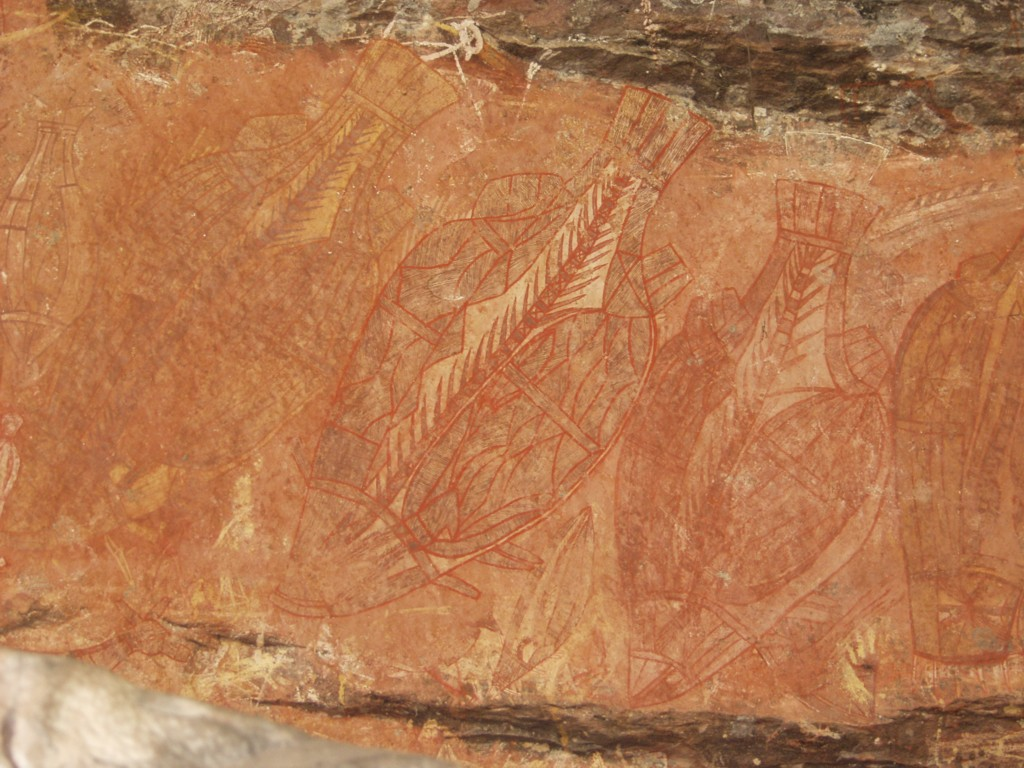
Aboriginal art showing barramundi fish

Some natural sites are sacred to Aboriginal people, and often the location where seasonal rituals were performed. During these rituals the Aboriginal people created art such as feather and fibre objects, they painted and created rock engravings, and also painted on bark of the Eucalyptus tetrodonta trees. While stories differed among the clans, language groups, and wider groups, the Dreaming (or Jukurrpa) is common to all Aboriginal peoples. As part of these beliefs, during ancient times mythic Aboriginal ancestor spirits were the creators of the land and sky, and eventually became a part of it. The Aboriginal peoples' spiritual beliefs underpin their laws, art forms, and ceremonies. Traditional Aboriginal art almost always has a mythological undertone relating to the Dreaming.

Wenten Rubuntja, an Indigenous landscape artist, says it is hard to find any art that is devoid of spiritual meaning:

Doesn't matter what sort of painting we do in this country; it still belongs to the people, all the people. This is worship, work, culture. It's all Dreaming.

Story-telling and totem representation feature prominently in all forms of Aboriginal artwork. Additionally, the female form, particularly the female womb in X-ray style, features prominently in some famous sites in Arnhem Land. X-ray styles date back all the way to 2000–1000 BCE. It is an Indigenous technique where the artist creates conceptualised X-ray, transparent, images. The mimi, spirits who taught the art of painting to the Aboriginal people, and ancestors are "released" through these types of artwork.

=== Traditional cultural expressions ===
Traditional knowledge and traditional cultural expressions are both types of indigenous knowledge, according to the definitions and terminology used in the UN Declaration on the Rights of Indigenous Peoples and by the World Intellectual Property Organization's (WIPO) Intergovernmental Committee on Intellectual Property and Genetic Resources, Traditional Knowledge and Folklore. "Traditional cultural expressions" is used by WIPO to refer to "any form of artistic and literary expression in which traditional culture and knowledge are embodied. They are transmitted from one generation to the next, and include handmade textiles, paintings, stories, legends, ceremonies, music, songs, rhythms and dance".

Leading international authority on Indigenous cultural and intellectual property, Australian lawyer Terri Janke, says that within Australian Indigenous communities, "the use of the word 'traditional' tends not to be preferred as it implies that Indigenous culture is locked in time".

=== Vandalism and other threats ===
Many culturally as well as historically significant sites of Aboriginal rock paintings have degraded over time, as well as being desecrated and destroyed by encroachment of early settlers and modern-day visitors (including erosion caused by excessive touching); clearing for development of industries; and wanton vandalism and graffiti in criminal acts of destruction. Some recent examples are cited below.

In 2022, in an event which made news around the world, unique 30,000-year-old artwork at Koonalda Cave on the Nullarbor Plain in South Australia, which had been heritage-listed in 2014 because of its rarity, was vandalised and much of the artwork rendered unrecoverable. The site was of great significance to the Mirning people.

In 2023, three large panels of rock art were removed from Murujuga in Western Australia, in order to build a new fertiliser factory. Several archaeologists have urged others to join Aboriginal voices in protesting against this type of damage to cultural sites.

In late 2023 and early 2024, the Bulgandry Aboriginal art site in the Brisbane Water National Park, an ancient Aboriginal art site in New South Wales, was vandalised twice within a few months. NSW National Parks and Wildlife Service closed off one walking track to the site, installed signs, and installed surveillance cameras, in a bid to prevent further damage.

== Traditional Torres Strait Islander art ==
Mythology and culture, deeply influenced by the ocean and the natural life around the islands, have always informed traditional artforms. Featured strongly are turtles, fish, dugongs, sharks, seabirds and saltwater crocodiles, which are considered totemic beings.

Elaborate headdresses or dhari (also spelt dari), as featured on the Torres Strait Islander flag, are created for the purposes of ceremonial dances. The dari was historically worn by Torres Strait warriors in battle. It is seen as a powerful symbol of the Torres Strait Islander people, today representing peace and harmony. World-renowned artist Ken Thaiday Snr has created elaborate dharis using modern materials in his contemporary artwork.

Torres Strait Islander people are the only culture in the world to make turtleshell masks, known as krar (turtleshell) in the Western Islands and le-op (human face) in the Eastern Islands.

Prominent among the artforms is wame (alt. wameya), many different string figures.

The Islands have a long tradition of woodcarving, creating masks and drums, and carving decorative features on these and other items for ceremonial use. From the 1970s, young artists were beginning their studies at around the same time that a significant re-connection to traditional myths and legends was happening. Margaret Lawrie's publications, Myths and Legends of the Torres Strait (1970) and Tales from the Torres Strait (1972), reviving stories which had all but been forgotten, influenced the artists greatly. While some of these stories had been written down by Haddon after his 1898 expedition to the Torres Strait, many had subsequently fallen out of use or been forgotten.

== Differing traditions ==
Traditional symbols vary widely among different groups of Aboriginal people, which are usually related to language groups. Since dot painting became popular from the 1970s, and was further developed in contemporary Indigenous art, it has become a common perception that all Aboriginal art uses dot symbolism. New South Wales artist Shane Smithers has pointed out that roadside representations of Aboriginal art in his country do not represent his people's (Dharug and Dharawal) art and symbolic traditions, which uses lines rather than dots, which are a visual language from the Western Desert region.

== Contemporary Aboriginal art ==
=== Modern Aboriginal artists ===
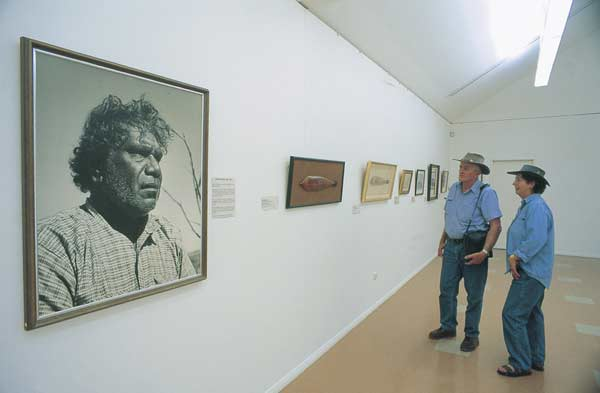
Picture of Albert Namatjira at the Albert Namatjira Gallery, Alice Springs Cultural Precinct, in 2007

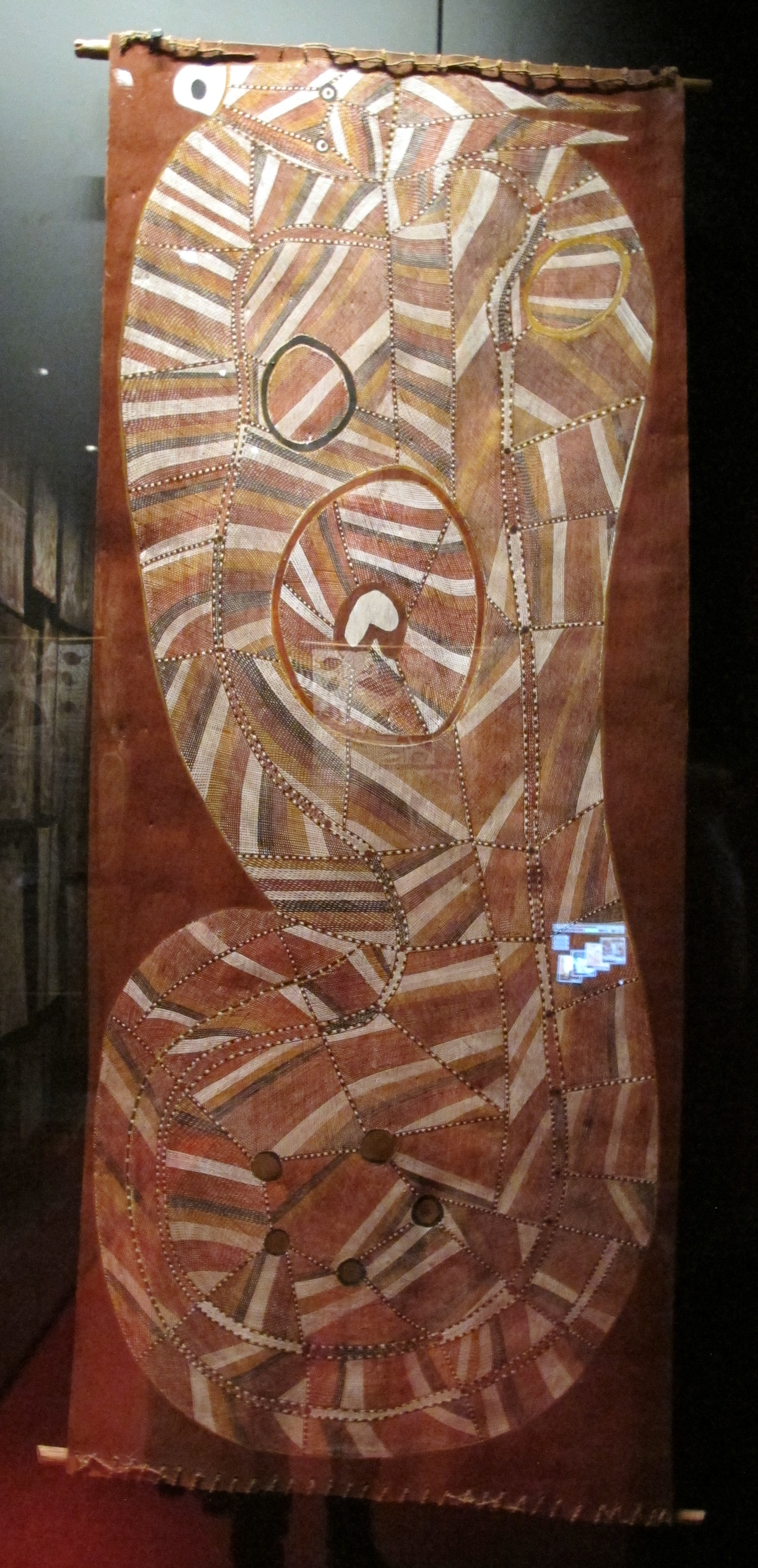
Rainbow Serpent by John Mawurndjul, 1991

In the 1930s, artists Rex Battarbee and John Gardner introduced watercolour painting to Albert Namatjira, an Indigenous man at Hermannsberg Mission, south-west of Alice Springs. His landscape paintings, first created in 1936 and exhibited in Australian cities in 1938, were immediately successful, and he became the first Indigenous Australian watercolourist as well as the first to successfully exhibit and sell his works to the non-Indigenous community. Namatjira's style of work was adopted by other Indigenous artists in the region beginning with his close male relatives, and they became known as the Hermannsburg School or as the Arrernte Watercolourists.

In 1988 the Aboriginal Memorial was unveiled at the National Gallery of Australia in Canberra made from 200 hollow log coffins, which are similar to the type used for mortuary ceremonies in Arnhem Land. It was made for the bicentenary of Australia's colonisation, and is in remembrance of Aboriginal people who had died protecting their land during conflict with settlers. It was created by 43 artists from Ramingining and communities nearby.

In the late 1980s and early 1990s the work of Emily Kngwarreye, from the Utopia community north east of Alice Springs, became very popular. Her styles, which changed every year, have been seen as a mixture of traditional Aboriginal and contemporary Australian. Her rise in popularity has prefigured that of many Indigenous artists from central, northern and western Australia, such as her niece Kathleen Petyarre, Angelina Pwerle, Minnie Pwerle, Dorothy Napangardi, and many others.

=== Papunya Tula and dot painting ===
In 1971–1972, art teacher Geoffrey Bardon encouraged Aboriginal people in Papunya, north west of Alice Springs to put their Dreamings onto canvas. Dot painting emerged in Indigenous Australian communities, particularly during the Papunya Tula art movement in the 1970s. The dots were used to cover secret-sacred ceremonies. Originally, the Tula artists succeeded in forming their own company with an Aboriginal Name, Papunya Tula Artists Pty Ltd. The Papunya Collection at the National Museum of Australia contains over 200 artefacts and paintings, including examples of 1970s dot paintings.

=== Issues ===
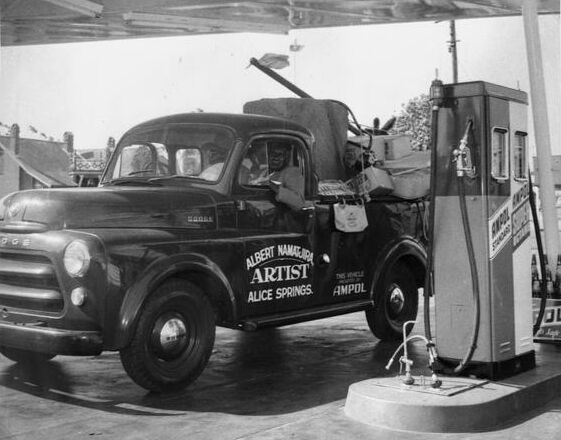
Albert Namatjira refuelling for a trip to Alice Springs, around 1948

There have been cases of some exploitative dealers who have sought to profit from the success of the Aboriginal art movements, particularly after art sales boomed between 1994 and 1997. In August 2006, following concerns raised about unethical practices in the Indigenous art sector, the Australian Senate initiated an inquiry into issues in the sector, with its report published in 2007.

=== Aboriginal art movements and cooperatives ===
Australian Indigenous art movements and cooperatives have been central to the emergence of Indigenous Australian art. Whereas many western artists pursue formal training and work as individuals, most contemporary Indigenous art is created in community groups and art centres. One of the main reasons the Yuendumu movement, based at Warlukurlangu Artists was established, and later flourished, was due to the feeling of exploitation amongst artists.

== Contemporary Torres Strait Islander art ==
In the 1990s a group of younger Torres Strait Island artists, including the award-winning Dennis Nona (b. 1973), started translating traditional skills into the more portable forms of printmaking, linocut, and etching, as well as larger scale bronze sculptures. Other outstanding artists include Billy Missi (1970–2012), known for his decorated black and white linocuts of the local vegetation and eco-systems, and Alick Tipoti (b.1975). These and other Torres Strait artists have greatly expanded the forms of Indigenous art within Australia, bringing superb Melanesian carving skills as well as new stories and subject matter. The College of Technical and Further Education on Thursday Island was a starting point for young Islanders to pursue studies in art. Many went on to further art studies, especially in printmaking, initially in Cairns, Queensland and later at the Australian National University in what is now the School of Art and Design. Other artists such as Laurie Nona, Brian Robinson, David Bosun, Glen Mackie, Joemen Nona, Daniel O'Shane, and Tommy Pau are known for their printmaking work.

== In international museums ==
Australian Indigenous art has been much studied in recent years and has gained much international recognition. The Rebecca Hossack gallery in London has been credited with "almost single-handedly" introducing Australian Indigenous art to Britain and Europe since its opening in 1988.

The Musée du Quai Branly in Paris, France, which opened in 2006, has an "Oceania" collection. It also commissioned paintings on the roof and ceilings of its building on the rue de l'Université, housing the museum's workshops and library, by four female and four male contemporary Aboriginal artists: Lena Nyadbi, Judy Watson, Gulumbu Yunupingu, Ningura Napurrula; John Mawurndjul, Paddy Nyunkuny Bedford, Michael Riley, and Yannima Tommy Watson.

Museums dedicated solely to Indigenous art outside of Australia include the following:

- The Kluge-Ruhe Aboriginal Art Collection of the University of Virginia, which opened in its current location in 1999, exhibits solely Australian Aboriginal art, and regularly mounts exhibitions.
- The La Grange museum for Australian Aboriginal art in the village of Môtiers, near Neuchâtel, Switzerland, is one of the few museums in Europe that dedicates itself entirely the art and culture of Aboriginal Australian peoples. During seasonal exhibitions, works of art by internationally renowned artists are shown. It opened in 2008.
- The Museum of Contemporary Aboriginal Art, in Utrecht, Netherlands, was dedicated to contemporary Australian Aboriginal art, but closed in 2017.

== See also ==
- Australian art
- Australian Aboriginal fibre sculpture
- Dampier Rock Art Precinct
- List of Indigenous Australian art movements and cooperatives
- List of Indigenous Australian visual artists
- List of Stone Age art
- Memorial pole
- Panaramitee Style
