= Petyarre =

Petyarre is a surname. Notable people with surname include.

- Gloria Petyarre (born 1938), Australian Aboriginal artist
- Jeanna Petyarre (born 1950), Australian Aboriginal artist
- Kathleen Petyarre (c.1940-2018), Australian Aboriginal artist
- Nancy Petyarre (1934/1939-2009), Australian Aboriginal artist
