= Josepha Petrick Kemarre =

Anmatyerre-speaking Indigenous Australian artist

- Born: circa 1945 or 1953; Santa Teresa Mission, Northern Territory, Australia
- Known for: Painting
- Movement: Contemporary Indigenous Australian art

Josepha Petrick Kemarre (born ca. 1945 or ca. 1953, date uncertain) is an Anmatyerre-speaking Indigenous Australian artist from Central Australia. Since first taking up painting around 1990, her works of contemporary Indigenous Australian art have been acquired by several major collections including Artbank and the National Gallery of Victoria. Her paintings portray bush plum "dreaming" and women’s ceremonies (known as Awelye). One of her paintings sold at a charity auction for A$22,800. Josepha Petrick's works are strongly coloured and formalist in composition and regularly appear at commercial art auctions in Australia. Her art appears to have survived the huge contraction of the primary art market in Australia since 2008. There is no existing Catalogue raisonné of Josepha Petrick's artworks, to date, no fakes have been cited.

== Personal background ==
Josepha Petrick Kemarre is an Anmatyerre-speaking Indigenous Australian, born around 1945 or 1953 at the Santa Teresa Mission, near Alice Springs in Australia's Northern Territory. (Note: Kemarre is a skin name, one of eight used to denote the subsections or subgroups in the kinship system of the Anmatyerre people. These names define kinship relationships that influence preferred marriage partners and may be associated with particular totems. Although they may be used as terms of address, they are not surnames in the sense used by Europeans. Thus Josie Petrick is the element of the artist's name that is specifically hers.)

When Josepha Petrick began painting for Mbantua Gallery in central Australia, she indicated that her name was Josepha rather than Josie, and that this was how she henceforth wished to be known; however Mbantua's biography is the only source that has used that version of her name.

After marrying Robin Petyarre, brother of artist Gloria Petyarre, Josepha Petrick moved to the region of Utopia, north-east of Alice Springs, which is where she was living when she began painting around 1990. They had seven children, one of whom, Damien Petrick, went on to become an artist like his mother. By 2008, Josie Petrick's husband had died, and Petrick was dividing her time between Alice Springs and Harts Range, to its north-east.

== Professional background ==
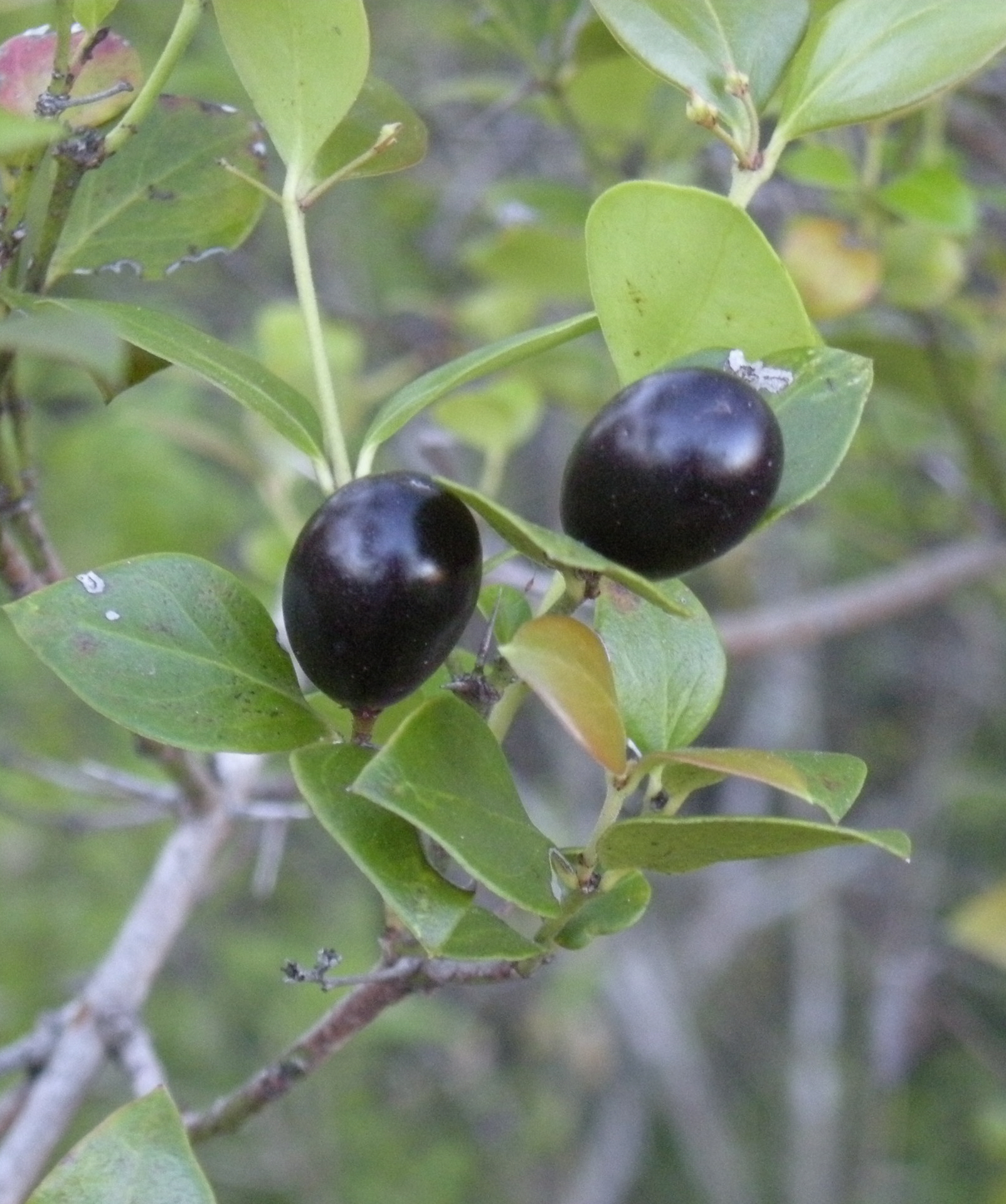
Carissa spinarum is represented in Josie Petrick's paintings of bush plum dreaming.

Contemporary Indigenous art of the western desert began in 1971 when Indigenous men at Papunya created murals and canvases using western art materials, assisted by teacher Geoffrey Bardon. Their work, which used acrylic paints to create designs representing body painting and ground sculptures, rapidly spread across Indigenous communities of central Australia, particularly after the introduction of a government-sanctioned art program in central Australia in 1983. By the 1980s and '90s, such work was being exhibited internationally. The first artists, including all of the founders of the Papunya Tula artists' company, were men, and there was resistance among the Pintupi men of central Australia to women also painting. However, many of the women wished to participate, and in the 1990s many of them began to paint. In the western desert communities such as Utopia, Kintore, Yuendumu, Balgo, and on the outstations, people were beginning to create art works expressly for exhibition and sale.

=== Career ===
A painting by Josie Petrick, showing the 'bush plum' pattern characteristic of her works.

Josepha Petrick began painting about 1990 or 1992 as part of the contemporary Indigenous art movement that had begun at Papunya in the 1970s. By 1998 her work was being collected by both private and public institutions, such as Charles Sturt University, and in 2005 a work was purchased by the National Gallery of Victoria. Her career received a significant boost when her work was included in the National Gallery of Victoria's 2006 Landmarks exhibition and its catalogue; her painting was printed opposite that of Yannima Tommy Watson, who was by this time famous, particularly for his contribution to the design of a new building for the Musée du quai Branly. Petrick's paintings have been included at exhibitions in several private galleries in Melbourne and Hong Kong, as well as at the Australian embassy in Washington in 2001.

In 2006 a commissioned work by Petrick was exhibited at Shalom College at the University of New South Wales as part of a charity fundraising exhibition. It sold for A$22,000. As of the end of 2008, the highest recorded auction price for an item of Petrick's work was $22,800, set in May 2007. An image based on a triptych by Petrick, Bush Berries, appears on the cover of a book on the visual perception of motion, Motion Vision.

Central Australian artists frequently paint particular "dreamings", or stories, for which they have responsibility or rights. These stories are used to pass "important knowledge, cultural values and belief systems" from generation to generation. Paintings by Petrick portray two different groups of dreamings, rendered in two distinct styles. Bush plum dreaming represents a plant of the central Australian desert which is "a source of physical and spiritual sustenance, reminding [the local Indigenous people] of the sacredness of [their] country". These paintings are undertaken with red, blue and orange dots that represent the fruit at different stages in its development. She also paints women’s ceremonies (Awelye) and dreamings, and these are created using rows of coloured dots and include representations of women's ceremonial iconography.

Journalist Zelda Cawthorne described Petrick as one of the "finest contemporary Aboriginal artists". Art consultant Adrian Newstead has ranked her as amongst the country's top 200 Indigenous artists, noting that she has become "known for innovative works that create a sense of visual harmony through fine variegated fields of immaculately applied dotting". Her style is described by Indigenous art writers Birnberg and Kreczmanski as an "interesting, modern interpretation of landscape".

Petrick's work is held in a variety of public and private collections, including Artbank, the Charles Sturt University Collection, the Holmes a Court Collection, and the National Gallery of Victoria.
