= Alyawarre =

Aboriginal Australian people of Central Australia region in the Northern Territory

The Alyawarre, also spelt Alyawarr and also known as the Iliaura, are an Aboriginal Australian people, or language group, from the Northern Territory. The Alyawarre are made up of roughly 1,200 associated peoples and actively engage in local traditions such as awelye painting.

== Country ==
Norman Tindale's estimate in 1974 assigned to the Alyawarre traditional tribal lands extending over some 17,800 square miles (46,000 km^{2}), taking in the Sandover and Bundey Rivers, as well as Ooratippra and Fraser Creeks. Notable sites associated with their nomadic world include Mount Swan, northern flank of Harts Range, Plenty River north and west of Ilbala, Jervois Range, Mount Playford and the Elkedra River. They were also present at MacDonald Downs and Huckitta.

The Utopia community, 250 kilometres (160 mi) north-east of Alice Springs, is partly on Alyawarre land, partly on land of the Anmatyerre.

== Language ==
The Alyawarre people speak a dialect of Upper Arrernte known as Alyawarre.

== Social organisation ==
The Alyawarre had a four-section marriage system.

- Pitjara
- Kngwarija
- Kimara
- Pula

== Demography ==
C. L. Yallop estimated the Alyawarre community to number 500-600 people in 1969. They were mainly concentrated at Lake Nash, the Georgina River, McDonald Downs, on the Bundey River, and the Warrabri Reserve.

In the 2016 Australian Census, there were 347 Alyawarre recorded in the "Utopia - Arawerr - Arlparra" Indigenous location. Only 4% of households only spoke English at home.

== Native title ==
In 1980 the Alyawarre made a land claim together with the Anmatyerre for the Utopia pastoral lease. In the same year, the lodged a claim along with the Wakaya people for land around the remote outstation of Purrukwarra. As a result, they were handed back 2,065 square kilometres (797 sq mi) on 22 October 1992, while the Wakaya were given 1,874 square kilometres (724 sq mi), both only small parts of the original claim.

== Alternative spellings ==
- Aliawara, Alyawara, Alyawarra
- Alyawarr, Aljawarra
- Ilawara
- Iliaura, Illiaura, Iljaura, Ilyaura
- Illura
- Ilyowra Illyowra
- Jaljuwara
- Yalyuwara

Source: Tindale 1974, p. 226

== Some words ==
- agira (kangaroo)
- aranga (emu)
- aringka (dog, dingo)
- irampa (honey-ant)

Source: Yallop 1969, pp. 195–197

== Notable people ==
- Emily Kame Kngwarreye, artist
- Ngarla Kunoth who played Jedda in the 1956 Chauvel film of the same name, now Chancellor of Batchelor Institute of Indigenous Tertiary Education
- Kathleen Petyarre is an Alyawarre / Eastern Anmatyerre artist
- Gloria Petyarre, artist
- Nancy Petyarre, artist
- Jeanna Petyarre, artist
- Minnie Pwerle, artist (from Alyawarre and Anmatyerre language groups)
- Elkin Reilly, Australian rules footballer
- Barbara Weir, artist

== Sources ==
- Allan, Susan (7 May 1999). "The Art of the "Dreaming": Review: Emily Kame Kngwarreye retrospective". World Socialist Website.
- "Arawerr - Arlparra". 2016 Census QuickStats: Utopia. Australian Bureau of Statistics.
- Denham, Woodrow W. (June 1974). "Infant Transport among the Alyawara Tribe, Central Australia". Oceania. 44 (4): 253–277. doi:10.1002/j.1834-4461.1974.tb01820.x. JSTOR 40330147.
- Denham, Woodrow W. (May 2014). "Residential Group Compositions among the Alyawarra". Mathematical Anthropology and Cultural Theory. 6 (1): 1–132.
- Eylmann, Erhard (1908). Die Eingeborenen der Kolonie Südaustralien (PDF). Berlin: D.Reimer – via Internet Archive.
- "From the days of whips and guns now we have our land back". Central Land Council. October 1992.
- Office of the Aboriginal Land Commissioner (1981). Anmatjirra and Alyawarra land claim to Utopia pastoral lease. Canberra: Australian Government Publishing Service. ISBN 978-0-642-05076-2.
- Spencer, Sir Baldwin; Gillen, Francis J. (1899). Native tribes of Central Australia (PDF). Macmillan Publishers – via Internet Archive.
- Strehlow, Carl (1910). Die Aranda- und Loritja-stämme in Zentral-Australien (PDF) (in German). Vol. 3. Frankfurt am Main: Städtisches Völker-Museum – via Internet Archive.
- Tindale, Norman Barnett (1974). "Iliaura (NT)". Aboriginal Tribes of Australia: Their Terrain, Environmental Controls, Distribution, Limits, and Proper Names. Australian National University Press. ISBN 978-0-708-10741-6. Archived from the original on 20 March 2020.
- Yallop, C. L. (1969). "The Aljawara and Their Territory". Oceania. 39 (3): 187–197. doi:10.1002/j.1834-4461.1969.tb01005.x. JSTOR 40329775.
