= Angelina Pwerle =

Australian Indigenous artist (born c. 1939)

- Born: c. 1939
- Known for: Painting
- Movement: Indigenous Australian art

Angelina Pwerle (pronounced 'Pull-uh'; born c. 1939) is an Australian Aboriginal artist. Her work is held by the Metropolitan Museum of Art, the National Gallery of Australia and other major institutions.

== Early life ==
Angelina Pwerle, an Anmatyerr woman, was born around 1939 at the Utopia homestead, in the region of Central Australia, about 250 km (160 mi) northeast of Alice Springs, more than 25 years before the pastoral property was returned to its traditional owners.

== Work ==
Untitled, 2023 (150 x 100 cm)

Angelina Pwerle began working with batik in 1977 under the instruction of Yipati Kuyata, a Pitjantjatjara artist from Ernabella. In 1986, she became a founding member of the Utopia Women’s Batik Group, alongside Emily Kame Kngwarreye and others. She took up the medium of acrylic paint on canvas in the Australian summer of 1988-9.

She has painted for Delmore Gallery since 1989.

Pwerle's first solo exhibition took place at Niagara Galleries in Melbourne in 1996. She continues to exhibit with the gallery, most recently in 2026.

Describing his introduction to the artist, Niagara Galleries director Bill Nuttall said: "I knew Angelina did sculpture. But after Emily [Kame Kngwarreye] passed away, Rodney [Gooch, art advisor] said to me: 'You know Angelina paints, too and she's just as good as Emily.' He sent me a small Bush Plum painting, and I was floored."

The work Pwerle has produced since 1988 can be divided into three main styles: abstract, naive, and ritual. Her abstract paintings are composed of numerous tiny dots and can be described as pointillist works. Her naive paintings depict the Atham-areny spirit people. Her ritual work consists of woodcarvings that reflect her deep knowledge of ceremony.

Pwerle's work appeared in Hosfelt Gallery's 20th Anniversary Exhibition in San Francisco alongside works by Jean-Michel Basquiat and Ed Ruscha. She was the subject of solo shows at Hosfelt Gallery in 2013 and 2018.

Pwerle is the subject of the 2012 documentary film Bush Plum: The Contemporary Art of Angelina Pwerle.

Her work was featured in the exhibition Marking the Infinite: Contemporary Women Artists from Aboriginal Australia, which toured the United States and Canada in 2016–2019. In the book published alongside the exhibition, curator Anne Marie Brody writes: "Pwerle's works are, like the late masterpieces of Mark Rothko or Claude Monet, deep crystallizations at the far frontier of creative endeavor."

Pwerle herself describes her practice as "a constant engagement" and "a spiritual connection to place."

=== Bush Plum paintings ===
Bush Plum, 2008 (120 x 90 cm)

Pwerle's best-known works are a depiction of her country's Bush Plum (anwekety) Dreaming.

These canvases characteristically feature an intense concentration of tiny dots which, says curator Nici Cumpston, "gives the overall effect of a subtly textured, shimmering surface."

Pwerle uses a wooden skewer to make these minuscule marks on the surface of her canvases.

In 2022, National Gallery of Australia director Nick Mitzevich told the Financial Times: "The way her practice has developed is extraordinary. She has refined the Central Desert dotting technique and used it to create abstract visions that are quite distinct from those made by her contemporaries".

Writing in The Monthly, Patrick Witton describes a Bush Plum composition as "a constellation of minute dots that cluster and crack forth across the canvas, capturing at once the granular and the expansive".

== Resale market ==
In 2022, the Financial Times described Pwerle as "an insider’s secret whose work is tightly held." Dealer D'Lan Davidson commented: "Although her paintings are part of major private collections, the significant works have rarely shown in the secondary market to date."

In May 2023, Sotheby's sold a painting by Pwerle with Niagara Galleries provenance for US $120,650 at auction in New York. In May 2025, Sotheby's sold a painting by Pwerle with Niagara Galleries provenance for US $127,000 at auction in New York.

== Collections ==
Institutions that hold two or more works by Pwerle include:

- Metropolitan Museum of Art
- National Gallery of Australia
- Fine Arts Museums of San Francisco
- National Gallery of Victoria
- Art Gallery of New South Wales
- Art Gallery of South Australia

== Orthography ==
She is also sometimes known by the first name Angeline and the surnames Ngal, Ngale and Kngale. There is some dispute among Australian art dealers about which names are "correct." However, most institutions, including the National Gallery of Australia and Sotheby's, now refer to her as Angelina Pwerle.

Speaking to Art Monthly Australasia in 2016, Pwerle herself explained: "Pwerle is the same as Ngale, just in another language." In Alyawarr country, Angelina is referred to as Pwerle, and in Anmatyerre country she is referred to as Ngale.

== Personal life ==
Pwerle speaks only her native Anmatyerr language and rarely leaves the Utopia region.

She is the younger sister of artists Kathleen Ngale and Polly Ngale.
