= Ampilatwatja =

Community in Northern Territory

Ampilatwatja Northern Territory
- Coordinates: 21.6579548°S 135.2265754°E
- Population: 515 (2021)
- Postcode(s): 0872
- Elevation: 397 m (1,302 ft)
- Time zone: ACST (UTC+9:30)
- LGA(s): Barkly Regional Council
- Region: Barkly Tableland

Ampilatwatja is a small community in the Northern Territory of Australia located 325 km (202 mi) northeast of Alice Springs.

== Governance and description ==
Ampilatwatja is administered by the Barkly Regional Council and is within the Utopia aboriginal homeland. The community has a school and the Ampilatwatja Health Centre.

There have been ongoing infrastructure issues affecting the community for years, including water quality, internet and mobile access, as well as road access issues.

== Demographics ==
Ampilatwatja lies within the land of the Alyawarre people.

As of 2021 there were 515 people, with a median age of 24. 90.4% of residents were Aboriginal and/or Torres Strait Islander people. There were 77 households and 82% spoke Alyawarr language at home.

== Art ==
Artists of Ampilatwatja is an art centre, founded in 1999. The paintings produced by the artists are distinctive, "due to the application of fine dots and the often bright and child-like figurative depiction of the land". Most of the artists paint Arreth, meaning "strong bush medicine", showing their deep connection to country.
