= Nancy Petyarre =

Aboriginal Australian artist (died 2009)

Nancy Kunoth Petyarre (between 1934 and 1939 – August 2009) was an Australian Aboriginal artist who lived in Utopia, 170 miles north east of Alice Springs. The second eldest of the famous and prolific 'seven famous Petyarre sisters' of Utopia (Ada Bird, Myrtle Petyarre, Violet Petyarre, Jeanna Petyarre and most notably Kathleen Petyarre and Gloria Petyarre), she was not herself a prolific artist.

Nancy Kunoth Petyarre was best known for her fine dot designs representing the skin on the back of Arnkerrthe, the Mountain Devil Lizard. She is buried next to Emily Kame Kngwarreye in a little-known spot along the Sandover Highway.

Petyarre was born at Soakage Bore, near Waite River, about 50 kilometres north-east of Alice Springs, sometime between 1934 and 1939 (reports conflict, and records do not exist). She grew up with four brothers, speaking the Anmatyerre language, in the area known as Utopia, where her parents, Topsey Pwerle and Mick Kngwarreye had lived traditional lives in the desert.

It was not until she was in her forties, in the 1980s, that Nancy started painting. She worked first on batik and later on canvas. She also made carvings which have featured in many exhibitions. Her most famous works are "Mountain Devil Dreaming" and "Body Paint". Her first exhibition came when she was believed to be around 50 years old, at Sydney's S. H. Ervin Gallery as part of a group show in 1989.

Her work is represented in the collections of:

- Museum and Art Gallery of the Northern Territory, Darwin, Australia
- The National Gallery of Australia
- The Art Gallery of New South Wales
- The Robert Holmes à Court Collection, Western Australia in a book entitled Utopia – A Picture Story, 88 Silks batiks, 1990, Anne Brody
- The National Gallery of Victoria, Melbourne, Australia.
