= Minnie Pwerle =

Australian artist (died 2006)

- Born: between 1910 and 1922 near Utopia, Northern Territory, Australia
- Died: 18 March 2006
- Known for: Painting
- Movement: Contemporary Indigenous Australian art

Minnie Pwerle (also Minnie Purla or Minnie Motorcar Apwerl; born between 1910 and 1922 – 18 March 2006) was an Australian Aboriginal (Alyawarre/Anmatyerre) artist. She came from Utopia, Northern Territory (Unupurna in local language), a cattle station in the Sandover area of Central Australia 300 kilometres (190 mi) northeast of Alice Springs.

Minnie began painting in 2000 at about the age of 80, and her pictures soon became popular and sought-after works of contemporary Indigenous Australian art. In the years after she took up painting on canvas until she died in 2006, Minnie's works were exhibited around Australia and collected by major galleries, including the Art Gallery of New South Wales, the National Gallery of Victoria and the Queensland Art Gallery. With popularity came pressure from those keen to acquire her work. She was allegedly "kidnapped" by people who wanted her to paint for them, and there have been media reports of her work being forged. Minnie's work is often compared with that of her sister-in-law Emily Kame Kngwarreye, who also came from the Sandover and took up acrylic painting late in life. Minnie's daughter, Barbara Weir, is a respected artist in her own right.

== Personal life ==
The location of Utopia station, north-east of Alice Springs

Minnie was born in the early 20th century near Utopia, Northern Territory, 300 kilometres (190 mi) north-east of Alice Springs, Northern Territory. Utopia was a cattle station that was returned to Indigenous ownership in the late 1970s. It is part of a broader region known as the Sandover, containing about 20 Indigenous outstations and centred on the Sandover River. Minnie was one of the traditional owners of Utopia station recognised in the 1980 Indigenous land claim made over the property; her particular country was known as Atnwengerrp.

Pwerle (in the Anmatyerre language) or Apwerle (in Alyawarr) is a skin name, one of 16 used to denote the subsections or subgroups in the kinship system of central Australian Indigenous people. These names define kinship relationships that influence preferred marriage partners, and may be associated with particular totems. Although they may be used as terms of address, they are not surnames in the sense used by Europeans. Thus "Minnie" is the element of the artist's name that is specifically hers.

Estimates of Minnie's birthdate vary widely. The National Gallery of Victoria estimates around 1915; Birnberg's biographical survey of Indigenous artists from central Australia gives a birth date of around 1920; The new McCulloch's Encyclopedia of Australian Art suggests around 1922; Elizabeth Fortescue's biographical essay in Art of Utopia offers a range between 1910 and 1920. The uncertainty arises because Indigenous Australians often estimate dates of birth by comparison with other events, especially for those born before contact with European Australians. Minnie was one of six children, and had three sisters: Molly, born around 1920, Emily, born around 1922, and Galya, born in the 1930s. She was of the Anmatyerre and Alyawarre Aboriginal language groups.

In about 1945, Minnie had an affair with a married man, Jack Weir, described by one source as a pastoral station owner, by a second as "an Irish Australian man who owned a cattle run called Bundy River Station", and by another as an Irish "stockman". A relationship such as that between Minnie and Weir was illegal, and the pair were jailed; Weir died shortly after his release. Minnie had a child from their liaison, who was partly raised by Minnie's sister-in-law, artist Emily Kngwarreye, and became prominent Indigenous artist Barbara Weir. Barbara Weir was one of the Stolen Generations. At about the age of nine, she was forcibly taken from her family, who believed she had then been killed. The family were reunited in the late 1960s, but Barbara did not form a close bond with Minnie. Barbara married Mervyn Torres, and as of 2000 had six children and thirteen grandchildren.

Minnie went on to have six further children with her husband "Motorcar" Jim Ngala, including Aileen, Betty, Raymond and Dora Mpetyane, and two others who by 2010 had died. Her grandchildren include Fred Torres, who founded private art gallery DACOU in 1993, and artist Teresa Purla (or Pwerle).

Minnie began painting in late 1999 or 2000, when she was almost 80. When asked why she had not begun earlier (painting and batik works had been created at Utopia for over 20 years), her daughter Barbara Weir reported Minnie's answer as being that "no-one had asked her". By the 2000s, she was reported as living at Alparra, the largest of Utopia's communities, or at Urultja (also Irrultja, again in the Sandover region). Sprightly and outgoing, even in her eighties she could outrun younger women chasing goannas for bushfood, and she continued to create art works until two days before her death on 18 March 2006. She was outlived by all her sisters except Maggie Pwerle, mother of artists Gloria and Kathleen Petyarre (or Pitjara).

== Career ==
In the 1970s and 1980s Utopia became well known for the design and production of batiks. By 1981 there were 50 artists at Utopia creating batik works; 88 artists participated in a major design project supported by the Central Australian Aboriginal Media Association. Although several sources comment that artistic activity at Utopia began with batik and only later moved to painting, they do not state whether or not Minnie was a textile artist before she took up the brush. The National Gallery of Victoria's brief biography suggests that she did not participate in the making of batik, but she was aware of it.

A painting by Minnie Pwerle, showing characteristic pendulous outlines, depicting body painting designs, and circles representing bush tomato, bush melon, and northern wild orange bushfoods

When Minnie decided to take up painting in 2000 while she waited for her daughter Barbara to complete a canvas in an Adelaide workshop, the reception was immediately positive: she had her first solo exhibition that same year at Melbourne's Flinders Lane Gallery. She was first selected to exhibit in the National Aboriginal and Torres Strait Islander Art Award in 2002. One of her pieces, Awelye Atnwengerrp, was exhibited in the 2003 Award, in which her name was given as Minnie Motorcar Apwerl (Pwerle). The artist's asking price for the picture, A$44,000, was the second-highest in the exhibition and the highest for an artist from the central and western deserts. Her painting Awelye Atnwengerrp 2 was exhibited in the 2005 competition. She was named by Australian Art Collector as one of Australia's 50 most collectible artists in 2004.

There were many group and solo exhibitions of Minnie's work at private galleries between 2000 and 2006. These included exhibitions at Japinka Gallery in Western Australia in 2003 and 2005, Adelaide's Dacou Gallery in 2000 and 2002, Sydney's Gallery Savah between 2000 and 2002 as well as in 2006, and Melbourne's Flinders Lane Gallery in 2000, 2004 and 2006, the last of which was a joint exhibition conducted with her three sisters, all of whom are artists in their own right.

Desert art specialist Professor Vivien Johnson noted that Minnie was one of the Utopia artists whose style was "radically different from [that of] all the other painting communities in the Western Desert—and stunningly successful in the market place". Her most famous fellow artist was Emily Kngwarreye, whose painting Earth's Creation in 2007 sold for over $1 million, setting a record for the price paid for a painting by an Indigenous Australian artist. Unlike Minnie, Emily had been an active participant in the early batik movement at Utopia.

Minnie (like Emily) was often placed under considerable pressure to produce works. She was reportedly "kidnapped" by people "keen to go to often quite bizarre lengths to acquire" her work. Minnie's experience reflected broader issues in the industry surrounding artists, who were often older, had limited education or English language ability, and faced serious poverty both themselves and amongst their families. In addition to being pressured to paint by others, there were media reports suggesting that some of the vast number of paintings traded under Minnie's name were not created by her at all.

== Style of painting ==
Minnie's style was spontaneous, and typified by "bold" and "vibrant" colour executed with great freedom. Her works, such as Anunapa, Akali held by the National Gallery of Victoria, were executed in acrylic (often referred to as synthetic polymer) paint on canvas. As with other contemporary artists of the central and western deserts, her paintings included depictions of stories or features for which she had responsibility within her family or clan, such as the Awelye Atnwengerrp dreaming (or Women's Dreaming). Indigenous art expert Jenny Green believes Minnie's work continues the tradition of "gestural abstractionism" established by Emily Kngwarreye, which contrasted with the use of recognisable traditional motifs—such as animal tracks—in the works of Western Desert artists. Brisbane artist and gallerist Michael Eather has likened her work not only to that of Emily, but also to Australian abstract impressionist artist Tony Tuckson.

Minnie's paintings include two main design themes. The first is free-flowing and parallel lines in a pendulous outline, depicting the body painting designs used in women's ceremonies, or awelye. The second theme involves circular shapes, used to symbolise bush tomato (Solanum chippendalei), bush melon, and northern wild orange (Capparis umbonata), among a number of forms of bushfood represented in her works. Together, the designs were characterised by one reviewer as "broad, luminescent flowing lines and circles".

== Legacy ==
Minnie's art was quickly added to major public collections such as the Art Gallery of NSW, Art Gallery of South Australia, National Gallery of Victoria and Queensland Art Gallery. It was also included in a 2009 exhibition of Indigenous Australian painting at the New York Metropolitan Museum of Art. Her works later formed the basis of a series of designer rugs, and, together with paintings by her sisters, illustrated the cover of art critic Benjamin Genocchio's book, Dollar Dreaming. Described by art dealer Hank Ebes as the works of "a genius", Minnie's paintings were typically selling for $5,000 in 2005; the highest price fetched on the secondary market at that time was $43,000.

Regarded as one of Australia's leading contemporary women artists, Minnie ranks alongside other notable Indigenous female painters Dorothy Napangardi, Gloria Petyarre and Kathleen Petyarre. One of a number of women such as Emily Kngwarreye who dominated central and western desert painting in the first decade of the 21st century, Minnie is considered to be one of Australia's best-known Indigenous artists, whose work "the market couldn't get enough [of]".

== Major collections ==
- Art Gallery of NSW
- Art Gallery of South Australia
- Kelton Foundation
- Kreglinger Collection
- National Gallery of Victoria
- Queensland Art Gallery
- Thomas Vroom Collection
- Hank Ebes Collection
- AMP Collection
