= Barbara Weir =

Aboriginal Australian artist

- Born: c. 1945 near Utopia, Northern Territory, Australia
- Died: 3 January 2023
- Known for: Painting
- Movement: Contemporary Indigenous Australian art

Barbara (originally Florrie) Weir (c. 1945 – 3 January 2023) was an Australian Aboriginal (Note: Weir self-identified as Aboriginal and was recognised by her community as such. The term has been used in the High Court of Australia to mean "a person of Aboriginal descent, albeit mixed, who identifies himself as such and who is recognised by the Aboriginal community as an Aboriginal ..." This definition is widely accepted and has its origins in work of the Australian Department of Aboriginal Affairs in the 1980s. Being Aboriginal or Indigenous has nothing to do with skin colour; a key element is self-identification and Indigenous community recognition.) artist and politician. One of the Stolen Generations, she was removed from her Aboriginal family and raised in a series of foster homes. In the 1970s Weir returned to her family territory of Utopia, 300 kilometres (190 mi) northeast of Alice Springs. She became active in the local land rights movement of the 1970s and was elected the first woman president of the Indigenous Urapunta Council in 1985. After starting to paint in her mid-forties, she also gained recognition as a notable artist of Central Australia. She also managed the artistic career of her own mother, Minnie Pwerle, who was also a noted artist.

== Early life and education ==
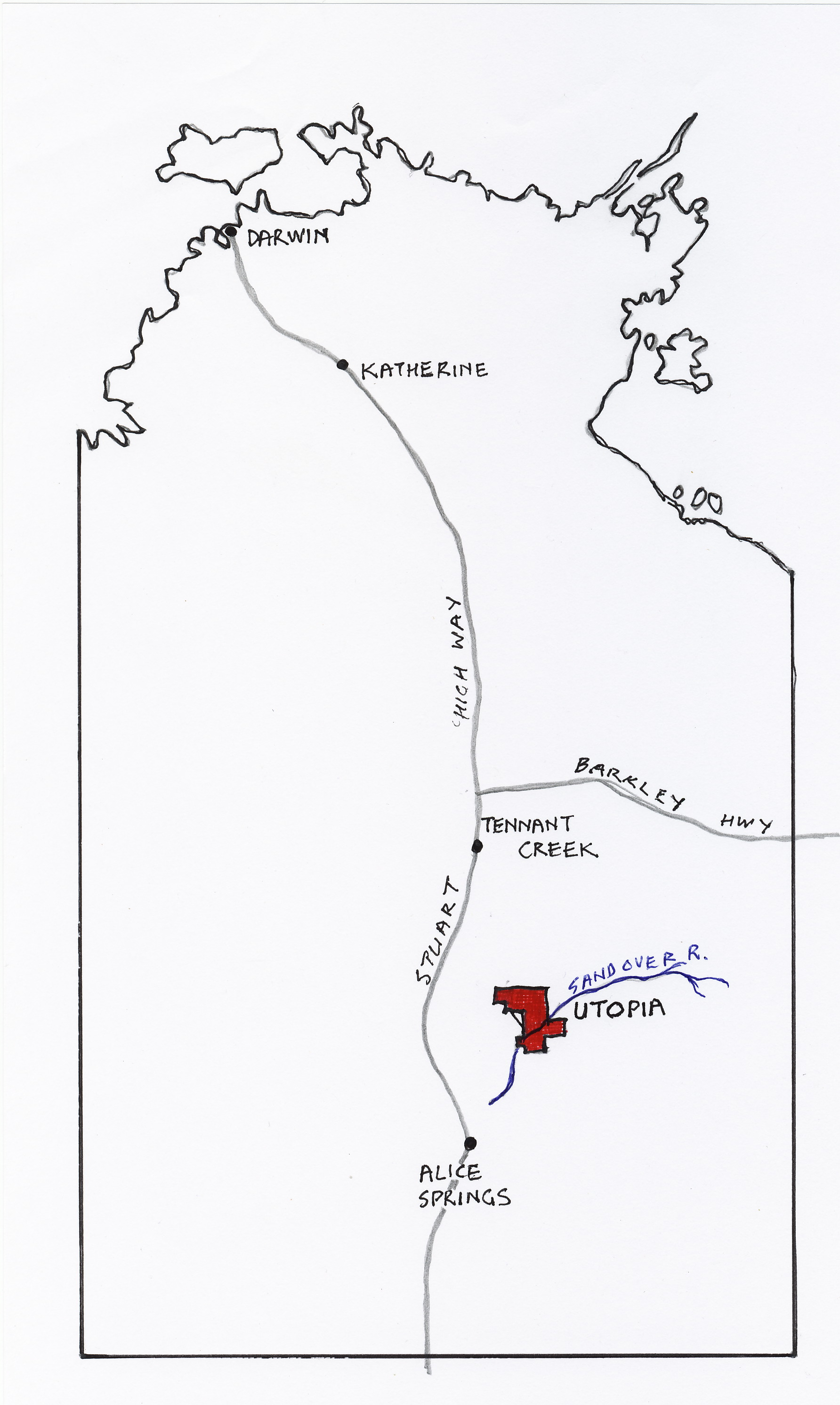
The location of Utopia station, north east of Alice Springs

Barbara Weir was born about 1945 at Bundey River Station, a cattle station in the Utopia region (called Urupunta in the local Aboriginal language) of the Northern Territory. Her parents were Minnie Pwerle, an Aboriginal woman, and Jack Weir, a married Irish man described by various sources as a pastoral station owner, "an Irish Australian man who owned a cattle run called Bundy River Station", or an Irish stockman. Under the anti-miscegenation racial laws of the time, their relationship was illegal, and the two were jailed. Weir died not long after his release. Pwerle named their daughter Barbara Weir.

Weir was partly raised by Pwerle's sister-in-law Emily Kngwarreye (Kngwarreye herself took up art in her eighties and became a prominent artist.) Weir grew up in the area until about age nine. One of the Stolen Generations, she was forcibly removed from her Aboriginal family by officials; the family falsely believed that she was later killed. This was done under the Aborigines Protection Amending Act 1915, which authorized government or assigned officers in the territories to take half-caste children to be raised in British institutions to assimilate them to European culture. Some, like Weir, were "fostered out", and she grew up in a series of foster homes in Alice Springs, Victoria, and Darwin. Boys were usually prepared for manual jobs and girls for domestic service.

== Marriage and family ==
In Darwin, at age 18 and working as a maid, Weir married Mervyn Torres. It was Torres who in 1963 or 1968, when passing through Alice Springs, asked someone about Weir's mother; he discovered that Pwerle was alive and living at Utopia. Mother and daughter were reunited but, although Weir regularly visited her family at Utopia, she did not form a close bond with her mother at first. Weir and Torres had six children before they divorced in 1977. She then moved permanently to Utopia with her mother and family. As of 2000 she had thirteen grandchildren.

== Political career ==
Weir was active in the local land rights movement of the 1970s, working to recover Aboriginal territory. She was elected as the first woman president of the Indigenous Urapunta Council in 1985. As of 2008 she was living in Alice Springs.

== Artistic career ==
In midlife, Weir began to explore Aboriginal artistic traditions. She first painted in 1989 at the age of about 45. Five years later in 1994, she was one of a group of ten Utopia women who traveled to study batik in Indonesia. Her paintings include representations of particular plants and "dreamings", inspired by deep Aboriginal traditions. Her works have been exhibited at and collected by major institutions. Art expert Jenny Green has commented, "In some of her paintings residual traces of women's ceremonial designs are almost entirely obscured by the heavy textural application of natural ochres."

After Weir's mother Minnie Pwerle took up painting in 2000, she quickly became a successful artist. Weir played a significant role in managing her mother's artistic career, including regularly preventing her from being "kidnapped" by people wanting the aging artist to paint for them.

== Major collections ==
- Art Gallery of South Australia
- Artbank
- Queensland Art Gallery
- Hank Ebes Collection
- AMP Collection
