= Awelye =

Aboriginal Australian ceremonial tradition involving body painting

Awelye (also "Yawulyu" in Warlpiri and Warumungu nations) is a ceremonial tradition that includes body painting and is practiced by women by the Anmatyerre and Alyawarr indigenous nations in the Northern Territory, Australia. The term can also be used to describe the songs, dances, totems, knowledge of country, and Dreamtime stories that are part of awelye. The practice of awelye is still actively performed throughout Central Australia for both social and healing purposes.

Equivalent male ceremonies include pujjarli (also yilpinji).

== Significance ==
The practice of awelye is a collective form of matrilineal kinship and sharing of knowledge of the land, customs, and Dreamtime stories. Teachings are expressed in different modalities such as song, rhythm, melody, gestures and dance, gathering, graphic imagery, totem objects, and spatial orientation. Within awelye, there are many differentiated roles and relationships which form a complex whole.

Awelye is important to kin bonding, education of country, and the passing on of tradition, which is done through gradual participation of the young. Furthermore, as Linda Barwick has observed, awelye has an increasingly important role in "the political and social recognition of performance in gaining and continuing to assert rights to land in contemporary Australian society".

== Continuation ==
Awelye is still actively practised by Anmatyerre and Alyawarr peoples. Although, rapid post-colonial social and demographic changes such as the degeneration of clan family structures into smaller nuclear family units, has made it difficult for the intergenerational transmission (colloquially referred to as "holding onto") of awelye practices. Many younger generations are separated from community estates for educational, health, and employment opportunities in larger towns and cities. Additionally, the introduction of television and radio has succeeded most ceremonial traditions as the dominant form of entertainment.

== Interpretation ==
Australian public intellectual Germain Greer has observed, "though Aborigines have no tradition of making portable paintings; they are all painters. Part of 'awelye', is painting the body with ceremonial designs."
