= Desert Mob =

Australian Indigenous art exhibition

Desert Mob is Central Australia's largest First Nations art and cultural event and exhibition, held in Alice Springs/Mparntwe annually since 1991.

== History ==
Developed by the Araluen Arts Centre, the first Desert Mob exhibition was held in 1991. Artwork is selected by Aboriginal art centres from across the Central Australia region, the birthplace of the Western desert art movement.

It is delivered in partnership with Desart, the peak body for Central Australian art centres. It now features an annual multi-gallery exhibition of more than 200 works, symposium, marketplace and other associated events.
