= Dorothy Napangardi =

Australian artist (died 2013)

- Born: c.1950s Wilkinkarra (Lake Mackay), Western Australia
- Died: 1 June 2013
- Known for: Painting
- Notable work: Salt on Mina Mina (2001)
- Movement: contemporary Indigenous Australian art
- Awards: Winner, National Aboriginal & Torres Strait Islander Art Award: 2001

Dorothy Napangardi (born early 1950s – 1 June 2013) was a Warlpiri speaking contemporary Indigenous Australian artist born in the Tanami Desert and who worked in Alice Springs.

== Life ==
Dorothy Napangardi was the daughter of Indigenous Australians Jeannie Lewis Napururrla and Paddy Lewis Japanangka, born in the early 1950s in a location referred to as Mina Mina, near Lake Mackay in the Tanami Desert. Napangardi (in Warlpiri) or 'Napangati' (in Western Desert dialects) is a skin name, one of sixteen used to denote the subsections or subgroups in the kinship system of central Australian Indigenous people. These names define kinship relationships that influence preferred marriage partners and may be associated with particular totems. Although they may be used as terms of address, they are not surnames in the sense used by Europeans. Thus 'Dorothy' is the element of the artist's name that is specifically hers.

She grew up in the settlement town of Yuendumu, and spent most of her life in Alice Springs, where she began painting in 1987. She had little formal schooling, but was instructed in the historic Dreaming of her people. 'Dreaming' is an imprecise English translation of the Warlpiri word 'Jukurrpa', which describes the origins and journeys of ancestral beings in the land, and identifies the sacred places where the spirits reside. The Jukurrpa theme, generally, is one of the inseparability of the self from the environment and usually includes travelling across the land. These are notions than can also be found in Napangardi's art, with its profusion of intersecting lines suggesting spiritual meaning and evocative depth. In the words of a Warlpiri speaker quoted in a catalogue of Napangardi’s work: "To me, Dorothy’s work is like Yapa (people) running through and across their country, moving across their pathways when they go travelling."

Napangardi was killed in a car accident on 1 June 2013.

== Art ==
=== Background ===
The contemporary Indigenous Australian art movement began in the western desert in 1971, when Indigenous men at Papunya took up painting, led by elders such as Kaapa Tjampitjinpa, and assisted by teacher Geoffrey Bardon. This initiative, which used acrylic paints to create designs representing body painting and ground sculptures, rapidly spread across Indigenous communities of central Australia, particularly following the commencement of a government-sanctioned art program in central Australia in 1983. By the 1980s and 1990s, such work was being exhibited internationally. The first artists, including all of the founders of the Papunya Tula artists' company, had been men, and there was resistance amongst the Pintupi men of central Australia to women painting. However, many women in the communities wished to participate, and in the 1990s many began to create paintings. In the western desert communities such as Kintore, Yuendumu, Balgo, and on the outstations, people were beginning to create art works expressly for exhibition and sale. In this context, in Alice Springs, Dorothy Napangardi began to learn alongside Polly Watson Napangardi, Margaret Lewis and Eunice Napangardi.

=== Career ===
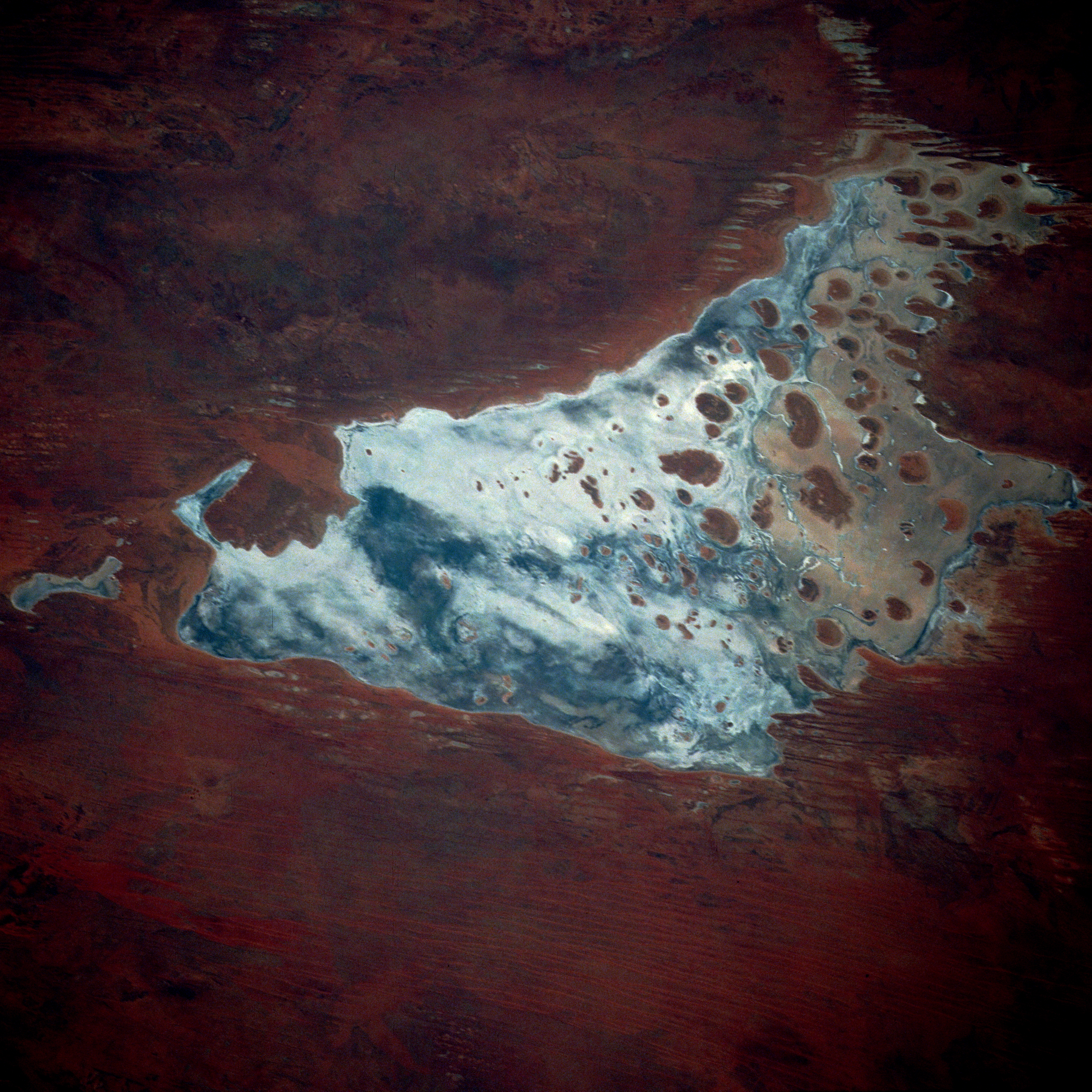
Lake Mackay in central Australia, where Dorothy Napangardi was born.

In 2001 Napangardi won first prize in the 18th National Aboriginal & Torres Strait Islander Art Award for her work Salt on Mina Mina, after winning lesser prizes in the same festival in 1991 and 1999.

She had many exhibitions in Australia and overseas. In 2002, the Museum of Contemporary Art, Sydney hosted an exhibition (Dancing up country) of Napangardi's work. Discussing the artist's work, expert Christine Nicholls wrote that "Dorothy Napangardi’s success as an artist lies in her ability to evoke a strong sense of movement on her canvases, an effect she achieves because of her remarkable spatial sense and compositional ability... [Her work] can be appreciated on multiple levels", though indigenous commentators tend to see painting as "a stage for human activity, rather than seeing the geometric aspects of the work." At the time of the exhibition, fellow artist Kathleen Petyarre thought there were parallels between Napangardi's approach to her work and that of Emily Kngwarreye.

Internationally, US-based Crown Point Press published a series of her prints and exhibited her paintings and prints in its gallery in San Francisco. The Hosfelt Gallery in San Francisco exhibited her paintings in a solo exhibition in 2005. She was included in a range of group shows, including in 2001 at the Sammlung Essl Museum in Vienna, Austria.

Napangardi’s work is found in many museums around the world, including the National Gallery of Australia, Canberra; the National Gallery of Victoria, the Art Gallery of South Australia, Adelaide, Queensland Museum, Brisbane, the Museum of Contemporary Art, Sydney, the Kluge-Ruhe Aboriginal Art Collection of the University of Virginia, Charlottesville, the Linden Museum, Stuttgart, Germany, and the Metropolitan Museum of Art, New York City.

She lived and worked in Alice Springs.

== Legacy ==
A retrospective exhibition of Dorothy Napangardi's work, Dorothy Napangardi Retrospective: The art and life of Dorothy Napangardi (1952–2013), was held at the Japingka Gallery (Perth, Western Australia) in 2020. The retrospective showed the artist’s journey towards the refined style of the later Mina Mina paintings that established her career as an outstanding artist. Thirty-six paintings and eleven limited edition prints were exhibited and available for sale.
