= Anmatyerr =

Aboriginal Australian people of Central Australia

The Anmatyerr (also spelt Anmatyerre, Anmatjera, Anmatjirra, Amatjere and other variations) are an Aboriginal Australian people of the Northern Territory, who speak one of the Upper Arrernte languages.

== Language ==
Anmatyerr is divided into Eastern and Western dialects, both dialects of Upper Arrernte. The linguist Jennifer Green has been key to documenting the Anmatyerr language and the anthropologist Jason M. Gibson has written about Anmatyerr history, language and ceremonial practice.

== Country ==
In 1974 the traditional lands of the Anmatyerr people in N.B. Tindale's Aboriginal Tribes of Australia were described as covering an area of 2.9 million hectares (7.2 million acres). He specifies its central features as encompassing the Forster Range, Mount Leichhardt (Arnka), Coniston, Stuart Bluff Range to the east of West Bluff; the Hann and Reynolds Ranges (Arwerlt Atwaty); the Burt Plain north of Rembrandt Rocks and Connor Well. Their eastern frontier went as far as Woodgreen. To the northeast, their borders lay around central Mount Stuart (Amakweng) and Harper Springs.

== Communities ==
Anmatyerr communities located within the region include Nturiya (Old Ti Tree Station), Ti-Tree Pmara Jutunta (6 Mile), Willowra, Laramba (Napperby Station) and Alyuen. What is today known as the Anmatyerr region has overlap with Warlpiri, Arrernte and Alyawarr language communities. Many people come from two or three different language groups. The Utopia community, 250 km (160 mi) northeast of Alice Springs, and set up in 1927, is partly on Alyawarr land, partly on land of the Anmatyerr. As a specialist in Arandic culture and language T. G. H Strehlow also worked with Anmatyerr people throughout his career, recording much of their ceremonial traditions.

== Alternative names ==
- Anmatjara
- Imatjera
- Janmadjara/Janmadjari (Warlpiri exonym)
- Janmatjiri (Pintupi exonym)
- Nmatjera
- Unmatjera (mainly an Aranda exonym)
- Urmitchee
- Yanmedjara, Yanmadjari

== Notable people ==
- Gwoya/Kwatye Jungarrayi, aka "One Pound Jimmy", was the first named Aboriginal person to appear on an Australian postage stamp, in 1950. Gwoya is the Anmatyerr word for 'water', Kwatye.
- Clifford Possum Tjapaltjarri and Tim Leura Tjapaltjarri, stepsons of Gwoya/Kwatye Jungarrayi, were Anmatyerr artists credited as leaders of the Contemporary Indigenous Australian art movement.
- Tim Leura Tjapaltjarri/Peltharr, was a key innovator of the desert painting movement
- Kaapa Tjampitjinpa was closely related to Anmatyerr families at Napperby Station
- Emily Kngwarreye was an Anmatyerr artist who lived at Utopia community.
- Michael Long (footballer), Australian rules footballer
- Ben Long, Australian rules footballer
- Jake Long, Australian rules footballer
- Kathleen Petyarre, Gloria Petyarre, and Jeanna Petyarre and two other sisters, nieces of Emily Kngwarreye, are well-known Alyawarre / Eastern Anmatyerre artists, also at Utopia.
- Minnie Pwerle was an Alyawarr / Anmatyerr artist.

== Sources ==
- Breen, Gavan (2001). "Chapter 4: The wonders of Arandic phonology". In Simpson, Jane; Nash, David; Laughren, Mary; Austin, Peter; Alpher, Barry (eds.). Forty years on: Ken Hale and Australian languages (pdf). Pacific Linguistics 512. ANU. Research School of Pacific and Asian Studies. (Pacific Linguistics). pp. 45–69. ISBN 085883524-X – via ResearchGate.
- Gibson, Jason M. (2020). Ceremony Men. SUNY Press. ISBN 978-143847855-5.
- Meggitt, M. J. (September 1955). "Notes on the Malngjin and Gurindgi aborigines of Limbunya, Northern Territory". Mankind. 5 (2): 45–50. doi:10.1111/j.1835-9310.1955.tb01418.x.
- Meggitt, M. J. (August 1961). "The Bindibu and Others". Man. 61: 143. JSTOR 2796739.
- Radcliffe-Brown, Alfred (1911). "Marriage and descent in North Australia". Science of Man. 13–14 (3–4). Sydney: 63–64, 81–82.
- Spencer, Sir Baldwin; Gillen, Francis J. (1904). Northern Tribes of Central Australia (PDF). Macmillan Publishers – via Internet Archive.
- Strehlow, T. G. H. (1947). Aranda traditions. Melbourne University Press.
- Strehlow, T. G. H. (1965). "Culture, social structure, and environment". In Berndt, R. M.; Berndt, C. H. (eds.). Aboriginal Man in Australia. Angus & Robertson. pp. 121–145.
- Tindale, Norman Barnett (1974). "Anmatjera (NT)". Aboriginal Tribes of Australia: Their Terrain, Environmental Controls, Distribution, Limits, and Proper Names. Australian National University Press. ISBN 978-0-708-10741-6. Archived from the original on 8 September 2005.
