= Jeanna Petyarre =

Australian artist (born 1950)

Jeannie Petyarre
- Born: Jeanna Petyarre; 1950s Utopia homelands
- Notable work: batik, painting

Jeanna Petyarre (b. 1950s), also known as Jeannie Petyarre, is a member of a family of artists that includes Kathleen Petyarre, Ada Bird Petyarre and Emily Kame Kngwarreye. Jeanna Petyarre is from the Utopia district of Central Australia. Her works feature in a number of collections including the National Gallery of Australia in Canberra, and the Holmes à Court Collection in Perth, as well as many private collections.

== Early life & Career ==
Jeanna Petyarre was born c.1950s into the Petyarre artist family at Boundary Bore, an outstation on the Utopia homelands, 270km north east of Alice Springs.

Jeanna began her painting career in the 1980s, with her works predominantly representing the traditional plants that her people collect and use as food sources and for medicinal purposes, specifically the Bush Yam and Bush Medicine Leaves. Jeanna was encouraged by her aunt, Emily Kngawarreye to continue to paint her families 'Dreaming stories', a collection of family art works which include Bush Medicine, Bush Yam Dreaming, and Wildflower Dreaming.

Originally from the Indonesian Islands, Batik textiles were introduced to Australia enmass in the early 1970s, where aboriginal artists developed it further as their own craft. In 1988, Jeanna joined a group of women who would go on to produce Batik work using desert design on silk and cotton.

== Exhibitions ==
Exhibitions include:

- 1989 Utopia Women's Paintings the first works on canvas
- 1990 A Picture Story exhibition of 88 works on silk from the Holmes a Court Collection by Utopian artists which toured Eire and Scotland
- 1993 Central Australian Aboriginal Art and Craft Exhibition, Araluen Centre, Alice Springs
- 2005 Cicada Trading, Illayda, Istanbul, Turkey
- 2005 Cicada Trading, Milan, Italy
- 2006 Cicada Trading, Dubai, United Arab Emirates; 2006 Cicada Trading, Annual Clear Lake Exhibition of Aboriginal Paintings, Houston, USA
- 2006 Cicada Trading, Paris, France
- 2006 Cicada Trading, Bahrain Art Society, the Kingdom of Bahrain
- 2006 Cicada Trading, Abu Dhabi, United Arab Emirates
- 2006 Colours of Utopia, Japingka Gallery, Fremantle WA
- 2006 Journeys of the Dreamtime: An Exhibition of Australian Aboriginal Art from the Central and Western Deserts and Cape York Peninsula, Beijing Blue, Hong Kong
- 2012 Desert Gold, Japingka Gallery, Fremantle WA
- 2021 Sounds of Summer 2, Japingka Gallery, Freemantle
- 2021 Top 20 2021, Art Mob, Hobart
- 2022 Palya – a tribute to Steve Ariston, Art Mob, Hobart
- 2023 KANANGOOR / Shimmer, Lawrence Wilson Art Gallery, University of Western Australia
