= Utopia, Northern Territory =

Aboriginal community in the Northern Territory, Australia

Coordinates: 22°15′S 134°40′E

Utopia 350 km north east of Alice Springs

Utopia, also known as Urapuntja and Amengernterneah, is an Aboriginal Australian homeland area formed in November 1978 by the amalgamation of the former Utopia pastoral lease, from which it gains its name, with a tract of unalienable land to its north. It covers an area of 3,500 km^{2} (1,400 sq mi), transected by the Sandover River, and lies on a traditional boundary of the Alyawarre and Anmatyerre people, the two Aboriginal language groups which predominate there today (85% speaking Alyawarre).

It has a number of unique elements. It is one of a minority of communities created by autonomous activism in the early phase of the land rights movement. It was neither a former mission, nor a government settlement (Aboriginal reserve), but was successfully claimed by Aboriginal Australians who had never been fully dispossessed. Its people have expressly repudiated any municipal establishment, and instead live in about 13 (or up to 16) outstations (homelands) or clan sites, each with a traditional claim to the place. The land is also differently identified as five Countries, which are reflected in Aboriginal place names, which were created by ancestors: Alhalpere, Rreltye, Thelye, Atarrkete and Ingutanka. Alhalkere, (also known as Alalgura) and Utopia Station.

Its local government authority is the Barkly Regional Council, with two elected local authorities, Ampilatwatja and Arlparra. The peak body for representing the residents is the Urapuntja Aboriginal Corporation. A permit is required for all visitors, obtainable via the Central Land Council.

The health of the inhabitants is generally better than the average Indigenous Australians' health. Utopia is known for its artists, such as Emily Kame Kngwarreye and the Petyarre sisters, and there is a community art centre at Ampilatwatja.

== History ==
Utopia and its neighbours. Outstations in red. c. 2007 map by John Price.

By 1872 the Overland Telegraph Line between Darwin and Alice Springs had been completed, which gave access to Europeans through many traditional lands. Pastoralism grew little by little. As the telegraph station to the south at Barrow Creek was constructed and inhabited, conflict between the local Kaytetye people and Europeans occurred. Punitive expeditions caused many Kaytetye, Warumungu, Anmatjerre, and Alyawarre and Warlpiri people to be killed. This conflict was part of the Australian frontier wars in Central Australia, which caused the displacement of many Aboriginal people. Alyawarra people displaced by the violence during European dispossession fled in significant numbers across Wakaya country to Soudan and stations on the Barkly Tableland, later moving to Lake Nash and to refuges in the east in Kaytete lands and beyond.

The first European in the Ampilatwatja region was surveyor Charles Winnecke, who travelled through in 1877 and whose expedition needed help from the Anmatjerre to find water. European occupation of the Sandover region began in the early 1880s, around the southern Davenport Ranges, the Elkedra and the Bundey Rivers. The settlements did not have access to a good supply of surface water; most were abandoned by 1895 because of drought and conflict with the Aboriginal people in the area.

However, the pastoral leases occupied the better-watered land, and continued to expand. Around 1910, freehold title leases were granted by the federal government in order to establish cattle stations on Alyawarr land, aiming to bring white settlers and development to this part of the continent. Traditional owners lost rights to culturally significant sites as well as to their traditional hunting areas.

Early pastoralists named Utopia in the 1920s, as a utopia in which they could catch rabbits by hand because there were so many of them.

The land which later became Utopia Station was first leased in 1928, but Aboriginal culture remained strong in this region. Many Aboriginal people worked on Utopia and other nearby stations, with men employed as stockmen and women as domestic servants. The name is said to have originated with German settlers, brothers Trot and Sonny Kunoth, who acquired the pastoral lease in the 1930s, but others have suggested that it could be a corruption of Uturupa, meaning "big sandhill", referring to an area northwest of Utopia.

In 1940, the land around Ampilatwatja was taken up by John "Nugget" Morton, who was connected to the 1928 Coniston Massacre, and he created Ammaroo Station. By 1947, the entire land through the Sandover subdivision had been occupied.

Relations between the Aboriginal people and cattlemen appear to have been problematic north of Utopia in Alyawarra/Anmatjirra/Kaititja country, but more cooperative in the south: Utopia, MacDonald Downs, Mt Swan, and Bundey River. The Chalmers family, who had owned the adjacent MacDonald Downs station since 1923, acquired the lease in 1965. They sold the lease of Utopia as a going concern to the Aboriginal Land Fund, before it was handed back to the Anmatyerr and Alyawarr people as Aboriginal freehold land in 1979–1980 under the Aboriginal Land Rights (Northern Territory) Act 1976. The Central Land Council had lodged the claim on 20 November 1978. Five clans (one Anmatyerre and four Alyawarre) became legal owners of the station.

Alyawarr people took up work as drovers and fencers on Ammaroo Station the 1960s and 1970s, and in 1976 they were granted a small plot at what was known as Honeymoon Bore, about 10 kilometres (6.2 mi) from the station, by the government; this later developed into Ampilatwatja, the biggest community in Utopia.

During the Outstation movement of the 1970s and 1980s, many Aboriginal people created and moved to tiny communities known as outstations or homelands, as a move towards autonomy and self-sufficiency. There are 16 outstations in Utopia, 13 of these being small family outstations, two (Irrultja and Arawerr) classed as "minor communities" and Ampiliwatja, with a population of 350, classed as a "major community" (see also below).

In 1976 Utopia pastoral lease No. 637 was acquired by the Aboriginal Land Fund Commission. In the 1990s Utopia Station was returned to traditional ownership, and around that time, the Alyawarr people of Ampilatwatja lodged a land claim for their traditional homelands.

In 2013, Utopia lent its name to, and was a major focus of, a documentary film by John Pilger named Utopia, highlighting historical and current issues faced by Indigenous communities across Australia.

== Governance, population and services ==
Prior to 1 July 2008, Urapuntja Aboriginal Corporation was the local government authority responsible for service delivery to the people who live on the Angarapa and Alyawarra Land Trusts. On this date, there was an amalgamation of councils into a new shire framework, but the Corporation remains the peak representative body for residents.

As of 2017 provision of services to Utopia is split between several bodies: Barkly Regional Council ("Shire" until 2014) has responsibility for aged care and night patrol services, while the neighbouring Central Desert Regional Council has responsibility for road maintenance, and Urapuntja has responsibility for administering mail and Centrelink. This arrangement has led to some confusion on occasion.

The council ward covering Utopia is Alyawarr. There are also two local authorities, which serve to advise the council on service delivery plans, give advice on Council community and social projects to improve the life of residents, and alert Council to new issues in the community. The two local authorities in Utopia are Arlparra and Ampilatwatja.

In the 2016 Australian census, the population of the Utopia - Arawerr - Arlparra Indigenous location was 401, all Aboriginal, 85% of whom identified as Alyawarr. Only 4% of households only spoke English at home. However the population can vary enormously, depending on seasonal, social and cultural events, and is estimated to be around 1,000 people in total. The population of the small outstations can vary between 20 and 100 people.

=== List of communities in Utopia ===
Today the largest centre is Ampiliwatja (about 350 people), with Irrultja and Arawerr next in size. The 13 family outstations are:

- Irrmarne
- Indaringinya
- Ngkwarlerlanem
- Inkawenyerre
- Atnwengerrpe
- Amengernterneah (clinic, Urapuntja)
- Atheley
- Iylentye
- Artekerr
- Inkwelaye
- Arlparra (store, Urapuntja)
- Illeuwurru/Illuraharra

Ampilatwatja (pronounced um-bludder-witch) is located in the heart of Alyawarr country, on the Sandover Highway, and is considered the "cultural heart" of the country, with many local artists living in this region. The Community Art Centre was established in 1999. The people of this area have close ties to the people who live at Alpurrurulam (Lake Nash).

Alhalkere, also known as Alalgura and formerly Utopia Station, lies adjacent to Utopia (and sometimes included in Utopia), and is the birthplace of Emily Kame Kngwarreye. Utopia is also described as a grouping of five Countries, named after the ancestors who created them, giving them Indigenous place names: Alhalpere, Rreltye, Thelye, Atarrkete and Ingutanka.

=== Services and facilities ===
The Utopia clinic is at Amengernternenh, and it services other small outstations such as Antarrengeny, Ngkwarlerlaner, and Arnkawwenyerr. It is "community-controlled". Aboriginal health workers are employed at some of the outstations.

Community facilities in Arlparra, about 17 kilometres (11 mi) south of the clinic, include a general store (with limited supplies of fresh food), sports centre, police station (built during The Intervention in 2007 and staffed by two officers), the main school and a campus of the Batchelor Institute, a tertiary education facility, and an aged care facility. Three other schools are based at Soapy Bore homeland, Apungalindum homeland and "the Health Clinic homeland.

There is an airstrip at Ampilatwatja, used mostly for mail and the Royal Flying Doctor Service.

There are other stores at Red-Gum Station and Three Bores.

The power station at Arlparra generates and provides power to all homelands in the Utopia region, Ampilatwatja community, Ammaroo Station, Irrultja and Atnwengerrpe Homelands. All bores on homelands are electrified, apart from two operated by solar power.

A permit is required for all visitors, obtainable via the Central Land Council.

=== Prohibition ===
The Utopia region is a dry community, and alcohol is strictly prohibited. There is a night patrol operated by the Urapuntja Aboriginal Corporation.

== Health and well-being ==
The 30-year history of Utopia (until 2011) is a record of self-determination against a background of well-developed communal will and widespread participation. The era of settlement included some profitable relations with white pastoralists and some degree of continuous Indigenous occupation. The community has had some success in mitigating the clinical disorders associated with transition to sedentary life, and minimising the advent of destructive behaviours and intoxicants. In addition, they have maintained a strong commitment to traditional practices and customs, which support identity in the face of coercive change. Sanitation issues such as the lack of rubbish collection and poor hygiene are significant obstacles to greater well-being.

A series of population health surveys carried out between 1986 and 2004 showed that Utopia people were significantly healthier than comparable groups, particularly their rates of mortality. This has been attributed to the more active "outstation way of life" and the consumption of traditional foods. Community living, cultural factors and the primary health care facility were also important factors.

In 2014, the borehole supplying water to the community of Utopia was broken during maintenance by Barkly Regional Council, and delivery of water via truck was irregular and insufficient, leading to the spread of disease. While there was dispute by authorities about the extent of the water shortage the Northern Territory government eventually agreed to fund the bore repairs, and money raised by a crowdfunding campaign was transferred to the Urapuntja Health Service.

== Art ==
Body painting and sand paintings have always been important aspects of ceremony, and there has been a tradition of woodcarving which still continues, such as in the work of Josie Kunoth Petyarr, Dinni Kunoth Kemarr and Trudy Raggett Kemarr. Batik was introduced in 1977 and proved to be a very popular medium among the artists.

In 1987, Rodney Gooch from the Central Australian Aboriginal Media Association (CAAMA) took over the Utopia Batik Group and encouraged the women to depict their stories and country on batik. This project culminated in the exhibition Utopia: A Picture Story, in which 88 artists contributing (all women, except for two and which was shown in Adelaide, Sydney, Perth and Melbourne and then travelled to Ireland, Germany, Paris and Bangkok.

In 1989, artworks on silk by women artists from Utopia were exhibited in the very first exhibition in the Tandanya National Aboriginal Cultural Institute in Adelaide, entitled Utopia — A Picture Story.

The artists continued to experiment with many media and styles, with the dominating styles being "gestural abstractionism", such as the work of Emily Kame Kngwarreye, and the fine stippling techniques, as seen in the work of the Ngal sisters and Kathleen Petyarre.

Utopia's Aboriginal artists have been remarkably successful, and continue to produce distinctive works that are collected by people in Australia and all over the world. Notable artists from Utopia include Emily Kame Kngwarreye; Angelina Pwerle; seven sisters including Gloria Petyarre, Kathleen Petyarre, Nancy Petyarre and Jeanna Petyarre, and their extended family members Elizabeth Kunoth Kngwarray (Kngwarreye) and others; Polly and Kathleen Ngal; Ruby, Lucky, Sarah and Hazel Morton; and many others.

=== Art centres ===
The Community Art Centre at Ampilatwatja, now known as Artists of Ampilatwatja, was established in 1999, and most artists based there paint landscapes and "Arreth" themes, which means paying homage to their traditional bush medicine, rather than Dreaming stories. The style is distinctive and different from most other Aboriginal artists, marked by their application of fine dots, and "often bright and child-like figurative depiction of the land".

There is also another, more recently established art centre, the Utopia Art Centre, established in 2020. It is located at Urapuntja and represents Alyawarr artists. where local artists Jennifer Purvis Kngwarreye (granddaughter of Emily Kame Kngwarreye, and an elder of the community) work. Jennifer's work (among others from the art centre) was exhibited at the Araluen Arts Centre in Alice Springs as part of the 30th annual Desert Mob exhibition in 2021, and bought by Artbank. The centre is 100% Indigenous-owned and -run, and as of December 2023, the manager is Sophie Lunn.

=== Some artists ===
- Abie Loy Kemarre
- Kudditji Kngwarreye,
- Betty Mbitjana
- Emily Kame Kngwarreye
- Elizabeth Kunoth Kngwarray (Kngwarreye)
- Jennifer Purvis Kngwarreye
- Gloria Petyarre
- Greeny Purvis Petyarre (c. 1930–2010, husband of Kathleen)
- Jeanna Petyarre
- Kathleen Petyarre
- Nancy Petyarre
- Angelina Pwerle
- Minnie Pwerle c. 1910–1922–2006)
- Jeannie Mills Pwerle
- Lena Pwerle, (born c. 1934)
- Janelle Stockman
- Barbara Weir

== Other notable residents ==
- Rosalie Kunoth-Monks, Chancellor of Batchelor Institute of Indigenous Tertiary Education. She played the title role at age 14 in the 1955 Charles Chauvel film, Jedda.
