= Gloria Petyarre =

Aboriginal Australian artist (1942–2021)

- Born: 1942; Mosquito Bore, Utopia, Northern Territory, Australia
- Died: 8 June 2021 (aged 78–79); Alice Springs
- Other names: Gloria Tamerre Petyarre, Pitjara
- Occupation: Painter
- Known for: Painting, contemporary Indigenous Australian art

Gloria Petyarre (1942–2021), also known as Gloria Pitjara, was born in Utopia, Northern Territory, Australia. She was an Aboriginal Australian artist from the Anmatyerre community, just north of Alice Springs. One of her best known work groups is "Bush Medicine".

Petyarre started as an artist in the Women's Batik Group in 1977, which was launched by the CAAMA (Central Australian Aboriginal Media Association). She continued her artwork through her paintings while also working with one of her six sisters, Kathleen Petyarre.

Petyarre died on 8 June 2021 in Alice Springs.

== Career and artistic impacts ==
Petyarre started her art career in the Women's Batik group and was known for Batik paint style. In 1999, she won the Wynne Prize with her piece Leaves at the Art Gallery of New South Wales. The Australian magazine Art Collector called her "one of our most collectable indigenous artists".[1] As of 2014, her overall career rank on the Australian indigenous art market was 13.[2] Her piece was known for its strokes and paint style, which furthered her career.

She became a travelling artist after the art exhibit in 1988 that was initiated by CAAMA. This art exhibit was held at the E.H. Sherwin Gallery in Sydney. Petyarre then travelled around the world to display her picture story exhibition, going to Ireland, England, India, and the U.S.

== Art style ==
Petyarre used batik, and she was known for her big leaf paintings. She mixed colours on her canvas, and used big and wide strokes in her works. Petyarre worked in the Women's Batik Group with some of her family, like her sister Kathleen Petyarre and well-known aunt Emily Kame Kngwarreye. Her work, such as "Bush Medicine" was influenced by huge brush strokes and heavy lines. She also created feather-like strokes with vivid colours, like her piece "Thorny Mountain Devil Lizard Dreaming". Her style ranged from landscapes and natural tones, to vivid colours and smaller strokes.

Petyarre's work is sold online, and can be found in National Gallery of Australia.

Petyarre lived at an outstation community in Utopia after 1977, where she started batik painting, exhibiting in shows around Australia for ten years. She began work on the "Summer Project" in 1989 which involved translating the batik paintings onto canvas. She was one of the founding members of this Utopia Women's Batik Group. She painted an original subject titled Leaves as well as body paint designs and several Dreamtime stories such as pencil yam, bean, emu and mountain devil lizard and small brown grass. Her paintings – monochromatic or multi-coloured – have well defined segments filled with curved lines. Her style was known for its abstract fields and bright colours.

== Family ==
Petyarre had six sisters, all of whom have received international recognition, foremost among them Kathleen Petyarre and Nancy Petyarre.

== Collections ==
- University of New South Wales Art Collection, Sydney
- National Gallery of Australia, Canberra
- Art Gallery of New South Wales, Sydney
- Kluge-Ruhe Aboriginal Art Collection, University of Virginia, Charlottesville
- Museum and Art Gallery of the Northern Territory, Darwin
- Allen, Allen and Hemsley
- Victorian Museum
- Powerhouse Museum, Sydney
- Westpac Collection, New York
- Gold Coast City Art Gallery
- Holmes à Court Collection
- Art Gallery of Ballarat
- Levi and Kaplan Collection, Seattle Art Museum, Seattle
