= Kathleen Petyarre =

Australian artist (c. 1940–2018)

- Born: Kweyetwemp Petyarre c. 1940; Atnangkere, Northern Territory, Australia
- Died: 24 November 2018; Alice Springs, Australia
- Notable work: Mountain Devil Lizard, Thorny Devil, Green Pea, Women Hunting Ankerr (Emu)
- Movement: Contemporary Indigenous Australian art
- Awards: National Aboriginal and Torres Strait Islander Art Award (1996)

Kathleen Petyarre (born Kweyetwemp Petyarre; c. 1940 – 24 November 2018, Alice Springs) was an Australian Aboriginal artist. Her art refers directly to her country and her Dreamings. Petyarre's paintings have occasionally been compared to the works of American Abstract Expressionists Jackson Pollock and Mark Rothko, and even to those of J. M. W. Turner. She has won several awards and is considered one of the "most collectable artists in Australia". Her works are in great demand at auctions.

== Background ==
Kathleen Petyarre was born at Atnangkere, an important water soakage for Aboriginal people on the western boundary of Utopia Station, 240 km (150 miles) north-east of Alice Springs in Australia's Northern Territory. She belonged to the Alyawarre/Eastern Anmatyerre clan and spoke Eastern Anmatyerre, with English as her second language. Petyarre was the niece of the influential Aboriginal artist Emily Kame Kngwarreye and had several sisters who are also well-known artists in their own right, among them Gloria, Violet, Myrtle and Jeanna Petyarre. Kathleen, with her daughter Margaret and her sisters, settled at Iylenty (Mosquito Bore) at Utopia Station, near her birthplace.

Petyarre was introduced to the batik medium at a hippy commune on a visit to Wollongong, New South Wales, and began making her own batik in 1977 with the support and encouragement of the linguist and adult education instructor Jenny Green. Petyarre continued to produce batiks with other women at Utopia until the late 1980s, when, prompted by allergies to the chemicals they were using, she began developing her signature style of painting with acrylic on canvas.

== Style ==
Petyarre's technique consisted of layering very fine dots of thin acrylic paint onto the canvas, evoking the Aboriginal custom of ceremonial body painting, to carefully construct abstract landscapes that reveal a remarkable depth when viewed up close. The dots are used to represent, among other things, flowers and spinifex, or animated clouds of sand, hail or even bush seeds. Meanwhile, various shapes and colours are used to depict geographical features such as sand-hills, watercourses and rockholes. Her imagery has been described as "simultaneously macro- and microcosmic".

Most of Petyarre's paintings detail the journeys of her Dreaming Ancestor, Arnkerrth, the Old Woman Mountain Devil, and are indicative of the Aborigines' traditional land navigation skills. She adopted an aerial view typical of her region's artworks to reconstruct memorised landscapes and express her Dreamings as "a barely tangible, shadowy palimpsest, overwritten, as it were, by the surface colours and movement". She described her paintings as "like looking down on my country during the hot time, when the country changes colour... I love to make the painting like it’s moving, travelling, but it’s still our body painting, still our ceremony."

From about 2003–2004, Petyarre's style became bolder, with clusters of larger dots and stronger lines alongside the very fine textures for which the artist is known. While this style was decried in some quarters as being less refined, it has also been hailed as a logical artistic development towards a more powerful and dramatic mode of expression, "perhaps more abstract, certainly more modern in its technicality and presentation" (text Gallerie Australis, Adelaide).

== Reputation ==
Petyarre's rise to international recognition began at the Aboriginal Art from Utopia exhibition at the Gallery Gabrielle Pizzi, Melbourne, on 31 October 1989. Despite remaining a relative unknown for the years to follow, she surprised the art world in 1996 by selling out her first solo exhibition, Kathleen Petyarre: Storm in Atnangkere Country, at Melbourne's Alcaston House Gallery.

Her considerable reputation as one of Australia's most original indigenous artists was confirmed by her regular inclusion in exhibitions at renowned international museums and galleries. A book about her art, Genius of Place, was published in 2001 in conjunction with a solo exhibition of her works at the Museum of Contemporary Art Australia in Sydney, and her paintings can be found in public and private collections all over the world. Her work was selected, along with just a handful of Aboriginal artists, for inclusion in the permanent collection of the Musée du Quai Branly in Paris.

== Controversy ==
In 1996, Petyarre was the Overall Winner of the 13th Telstra National Aboriginal & Torres Strait Islander Art Awards. Controversy arose in 1997 when Petyarre's estranged partner of ten years, Ray Beamish, claimed that he had been a major contributor to the winning painting, Storm in Atnangkere Country II, which currently hangs at the Museum and Art Gallery of the Northern Territory in Darwin.

This controversy, which shook the Aboriginal art market at the time, brought attention to the communal nature of art production in her culture and resulted in a much stricter emphasis being put on the documentation of authorship in Aboriginal paintings.

Petyarre’s name was eventually cleared and she retained her award. She went on to criticise Beamish for appropriating “her birthright” (her Dreaming) in his own paintings.

== Awards ==
- 1996 Overall Winner of the Telstra 13th National Aboriginal & Torres Strait Islander Art Award, Darwin, NT, Australia
- 1997 Overall Winner of the Visy Board Art Prize, the Barossa Vintage Festival Art Show, Nurioopta SA, Australia
- 1998 Finalist, Seppelt Contemporary Art Awards 1998 – Museum of Contemporary Art Australia, Sydney, Australia
- 1998 Winner, People's Choice Award, Seppelt Contemporary Art Awards 1998, Museum of Contemporary Art Australia, Sydney, NSW, Australia

== Exhibitions ==
=== Solo exhibitions ===
- 2008 Kathleen Petyarre, Metro 5 Gallery, Melbourne, Australia
- 2004 Old Woman alex award , Coo-ee Aboriginal Art Gallery, Sydney, Australia
- 2003 Ilyenty – Mosquito Bore, Recent Paintings, Alcaston Gallery, Melbourne, Australia
- 2001 Genius of Place: The Work of Kathleen Petyarre, Museum of Contemporary Art Australia, Sydney, Australia
- 2000 Landscape, Truth and Beauty – Recent Paintings by Kathleen Petyarre, Alcaston Gallery, Melbourne, Australia
- 1999 Recent Painting by Kathleen Petyarre, Coo-ee Aboriginal Art Gallery, Mary Place Gallery, Sydney, Australia
- 1998 Arnkerrthe – My Dreaming, Alcaston House Gallery, Melbourne Australia
- 1996 Kathleen Petyarre: Storm in Aknangkerre Country, Alcaston House Gallery, Melbourne, Australia

=== Selected group exhibitions ===
- 2007 Gallery Anthony Curtis, Boston MA, USA
- 2007 Galerie Rigassi, Bern, Switzerland
- 2006 Prism – Contemporary Australian Art, Bridgestone Museum of Art, Tokyo, Japan
- 2006 National Museum of Women in the Arts, Washington DC, USA
- 2006 Hood Museum of Art, Dartmouth College, New Hampshire, USA
- 2006 Galerie Clément, Vevey, Switzerland
- 2002 Gallerie Commines, Paris, France
- 2000 New Directions in Contemporary Aboriginal Painting, Songlines Gallery, San Francisco, USA
- 2000 Kathleen Petyarre, Retrospective Exhibition, Museum of Contemporary Art Australia, Sydney, Australia
- 1995 Ludwig Forum für Internationale Kunst, Aachen, Germany
- 1991 Royal Hibernian Academy, Dublin, Ireland
- 1989 Aboriginal Art from Utopia, Gallery Gabrielle Pizzi, Melbourne, Australia

== Major collections ==
- Royal Collection of HM Queen Elizabeth II
- Metropolitan Museum of Art, New York, USA
- Musée des Confluences, Lyon, France
- Musée du quai Branly, Paris, France
- AAMU Museum for Contemporary Aboriginal Art, Utrecht, The Netherlands
- National Gallery of Australia, Canberra, Australia
- National Gallery of Victoria, Melbourne, Australia
- Art Gallery of South Australia, Adelaide, Australia
- Museum and Art Gallery of the Northern Territory, Darwin, Australia
- Aboriginal and Torres Strait Islander Commission (ATSIC) Collection, Australia
- Edith Cowan University, Perth Australia
- Flinders University Art Museum, Adelaide, Australia
- Royal Palace Museum, Ubud, Bali, Indonesia
- Kluge-Ruhe Aboriginal Art Collection, University of Virginia, USA
- Peabody Museum of Archaeology and Ethnology, Harvard University, Massachusetts, USA
- Riddock Regional Art Gallery, Mount Gambier, Australia
- Essl Collection, Vienna, Austria
- BHP Billiton Collection, Melbourne, Australia
- Holmes à Court Collection, Perth, Australia
- The Kelton Foundation, Los Angeles, California, USA
- Kerry Stokes Collection, Perth, Australia
- Levi-Kaplan Collection, Seattle, Washington, USA
- University of South Australia, Adelaide, Australia
- Adelaide Festival Centre Trust Collection, Adelaide, Australia
- Seattle Art Museum, Seattle, Washington, USA (permanent loan)
- Art Gallery of Western Australia, Perth, Australia (permanent loan)
- Biebuyck Family Collection, Boston, Massachusetts
