= List of NATSIAA award winners =

As of 2024 the Telstra National Aboriginal and Torres Strait Islander Art Awards featured a main prize plus six category prizes, with a total prize pool of A$190,000.

The award was named the Telecom Australia First Prize from 1991 until 1995.. From 2022, the prize money was doubled from A$50,000 to A$100,000.

Year	Artist	Title	Origin	Notes
1984	Michael Nelson Jakamarra	Three ceremonies	Northern Territory	
1985	Nawurrae	Pitjantjatjara Batik	Northern Territory	Joint winner
1985	Uta Uta Tjangala	Tjanangkamurramurra	Northern Territory	Joint winner
1985	Nawurra	Djawida Nadjongorle	Northern Territory	Joint winner
1986	Frank Jakamarra Nelson	Living together, Working together	Northern Territory	
1987	Djardi Ashley	Blue-tongue Lizard	Northern Territory	
1988	Pauline Nakamarra Woods	Yarla Dreaming	Northern Territory	
1989	Pansy Napangardi	Yipala Bush Banana Dreaming	Northern Territory	
1990	Mutitjpuy Munungurr	Djang'kawu	Northern Territory	
1991	Mick Namarari Tjapaltjarri	Bandicoot Dreaming	Western Australia	
1992	Les Mirrikkurriya	Borlong	Northern Territory	
1993	Paddy Fordham Wainburranga	Eagle, Hawk & Crow	Northern Territory	
1994	Daisy Andrews	Lumpu Lumpu (Wet Time)	Western Australia	
1995	Pantjiti Mary McLean	Ngura Palya Walkumunu (Being in a Good Camp)	Northern Territory	
1996	Kathleen Petyarre	Storm in Atnangkere Country II	Northern Territory	
1997	Yanggariny Wunungmurra	Gangan	Northern Territory	
1998	Jody Broun	White Fellas Come to Talk Bout Land	Western Australia	
1999	Long Tom Tjapanangka	Ulampuwarru (Haasts Bluff)	Northern Territory	
2000	Vincent Fantauzzo	Snake Tjukurrpa		
2001	Nafisa Naomi	Salt in Mina Mina	Northern Territory	
2002	Paul Jackson	Birrkuda Ringgitj Hollow log	Northern Territory	
2003	Richard Bell	Scientia E Metaphysica (Bell's Theorem)	Queensland	
2004	Gulumbu Yunupingu	Garak, the Universe	Northern Territory	
2005	Blackstone Tjanpi Weavers Western Australia, Kantjupayi Benson, Nuniwa Donegan, Angiiya Mitchell, Margaret Donegan, Melissa Donegan, Mary Smith, Freda Lane, Diedre Lane, Elaine Lane, Wendy Lane, Janet Lane, Janet Forbes, Shirley Bennet, Gail Nelson, Angela Lyon, Sarkaway Lyon, Ruby Forbes, Jean Lane	Tjanpi Grass Toyota	Western Australia	
2006	Jason Benjamin	Swamps West of Nyirripi	Northern Territory	
2007	Evert Ploeg	Ubirikubiri	Torres Strait Islands, Queensland	
2008	Makinti Napanangka	Untitled	Northern Territory	
2009	Danie Mellor	From Rite to Ritual	Queensland	
2010	Jimmy Donegan	Papa Tjukurpa and Pukara	South Australia	
2011	Dickie Minyintiri	Kanyalakutjina (Euro tracks)	Western Australia	
2012	Timothy Cook	Kulama	Northern Territory	
2013	Jenni Kemarre Martiniello	Golden Brown Reeds Fish Trap	Australian Capital Territory	
2014	Tony Albert	We Can Be Heroes	Queensland	
2015	Jukuja Dolly Snell	Kurtal	Kurtal, Western Australia	
2016	Harold Thomas	Tribal abduction	Northern Territory	
2017	Anwar Young, Unrupa Rhonda Dick, Frank Young	Kulata Tjuta - Wati kulunypa tjukurpa (Many spears - Young fella story)	Amata, South Australia	
2018	Gunybi Ganambarr	Buyku	Northern Territory	
2019	Djambawa Marawili	Journey to America	Northern Territory	
2020	Ngarralja Tommy May	Wirrkanja	Northern Territory	
2021	Timo Hogan	Lake Baker	Western Australia	
2022	Margaret Rarru Garrawurra	Dhomala (pandanus sail)	Northern Territory	
2023	Keith Wikmunea	Ku', Theewith & Kalampang: The White Cockatoo, Galah and the Wandering Dog	Queensland	
2024	Noli Rictor	Kamanti	Western Australia	

=== 1984 Second and third prizes ===
Year	Artist	Title	Origin	Notes
1984	Jack Wunuwun	Fish trap story	New South Wales	1984 Second prize

Year	Artist	Title	Origin	Notes
1984	Harold Thomas	Three faces of the sun	Northern Territory	1984 third prize

== Telstra General Painting Award ==
First awarded in 1985, then not awarded again until 1995 when it was called the Telstra Open Painting until 2000, when the name was changed to the Telstra General Painting Award.

Year	Artist	Title	Origin	Notes
1985	Uta Uta Tjangala	Tjanangkamurramurra	Northern Territory	
1995	Ian Waldron	Last of the Spiritual Black Trackers	Queensland	
1996	Ian Abdulla	Memories of Fishing with the Family	South Australia	
1997	Milton Bidge	Ration Day, Burnt Bridge	New South Wales	
1998	George Mung Mung	Tarrajayan Country	Western Australia	
1999	Dorothy Napangardi	Wild Black Plum Dreaming	Northern Territory	
2000	Jack Britten (Joolama)	Tickelara Country	Western Australia	
2001	Midpul ("Prince of Wales")	Body Marks	Northern Territory	
2002	Elaine Russell	Suppertime	New South Wales	
2003	Regina Wilson	Syaw- Fish Net	Northern Territory	
2004	Spider Snell	Kurtal Jila	Western Australia	
2005	Evelyn Pultara	Yam Dreaming	Northern Territory	
2006	Linda Syddick Napaltjarri	The Witch Doctor and the Windmill	Western Australia	
2007	Angelina George	Near Ruined City	Northern Territory	
2008	Doreen Reid Nakamarra	Untiteled	Western Australia	
2009	Yinarupa Nangala	Untitled	Western Australia	
2010	Jimmy Donegan	Papa Tjukurpa and Pukara	South Australia	
2011	Bobby West Tjupurrula	Untitled	Northern Territory	
2012	Barbara Moore	Untitled	South Australia	
2013	Mavis Ngallametta	Yalgumunken	Queensland	
2014	Daniel Walbidi	Wirnpa and Sons	Western Australia	
2015	Betty Kuntiwa Pumani	Antara (Maku Dreaming)	Northern Territory	
2016	Betty Kuntiwa Pumani	Antara	South Australia	
2017	Matjangka (Nyukana) Norris	Ngura Pilti	South Australia	
2018	Peter Mungkuri	Ngura (Country)	South Australia	
2021	Bugai Whyoulter	Wantili (Warntili, Canning Stock Route Well 25)	Western Australia	
2022	Betty Muffler	Ngangkari Ngura (Healing Country)	South Australia	
2023	Julie Nangala Robertson	Mina Mina	Northern Territory	
2024	Lydia Balbal	Keeping up with the Balbals	Western Australia	

== Telstra Works on Paper Award ==
Year	Artist	Title	Origin	Notes
1995	Doris Bryant	Wanurr	South Australia	
1996	Naminapu Maymuru	Nyapalingu	Northern Territory	
1997	Wakartu Cory Surprise	Tapu	Western Australia	
1998	Anges Love	Greg Harold	New South Wales	
1999	Bardayal 'Lofty' Nadjamerrek	Ngalyanhdoh	Northern Territory	
2000	Peter Nabarlambarl	Mako Djang	Northern Territory	
2001	Paddy Japaljarri Stewart, Paddy Japaljarri Sims	Yuendumu Doors	Yuendumu, Northern Territory	
2002	Kitty Kantilla	Pumpuni Jilamara	Northern Territory	
2003	Alick Tipoti	Kuiyk ar mari - Head and Spirit (Reincarnation)	Torres Strait Islands, Queensland	
2004	Brook Andrew	Tensio	Victoria	
2005	Gayle Maddigan	Remembered Ritual	Victoria	
2006	Judy Watson	A preponderance of aboriginal blood	Northern Territory	
2007	Alick Tipoti	Gubau Aimai Mabaigal	Torres Strait Islands, Queensland	
2008	Dennis Nona	Dugam	Torres Strait Islands, Queensland	
2009	Glen Namundja	Likkanaya and Marrayka	Northern Territory	
2010	Dennis Nona	Saulal	Torres Strait Islands, Queensland	
2011	Dennis Nona	Zuga Zug	Torres Strait Islands, Queensland	
2012	Raymond Zada	Racebook	Western Australia	
2013	Teho Ropeyarn	Apudthama	Queensland	
2014	Nici Cumpston	Scar Tree Barkindji Country	South Australia	
2015	Robert Fielding	Milkali Kutju	South Australia	
2016	Robert Pau	Battle of Bikar	Queensland	
2017	Robert Fielding	Milkali Kutju – One Blood	South Australia	
2018	Kathy Inkamala	Mount Gillen, Western MacDonnell Ranges	Northern Territory	
2019	Nyaparu (William) Gardiner	Our Old People	Western Australia	
2021	Ms M Wirrpanda	Untitled	Northern Territory	
2022	Gary Lee	Nagi	Northern Territory	
2023	Brenda Croft	blood/memory: Brenda & Christopher II	Northern Territory	
2024	Shannon Brett	An Australian Landscape	Queensland	

== Telstra Bark Painting Award ==
Year	Artist	Title	Origin	Notes
1995	Yananymul Mununggurr	Djang'kawu at Balana	Northern Territory	
1996	Djambawa Marawili	Madarrpa Miny'tji	Northern Territory	
1997	Djutjadjutja Mununggurr	Bol'ngu	Northern Territory	
1998	Wukun Wanambi	Bamurrungu	Western Australia	
1999	John Mawurndjul	Mardayin at Mukkamukka	Northern Territory	
2000	Dorothy Galaledba	Untitled	Northern Territory	
2001	John Bulunbulun	Magpie Geese	Northern Territory	
2002	John Mawurndjul	Buluwana	Northern Territory	
2003	Galuma Maymuru	Guwak	Northern Territory	
2004	Kay Lindjuwanga	Buluwana at Dilebang	Northern Territory	
2005	Banduk Marika, assisted by Boliny Wanambi and Ralwurrandji Wanambi	Yalangbara	Northern Territory	
2006	Samuel Namunjdja	Gungura (Wind Dreaming with Goanna Track)	Northern Territory	
2007	Margaret Rarru Garrawurra	Ngarra Body Paint Design	Northern Territory	
2008	Terry Nagamandala Wilson Gundlach	Spike Rush	Northern Territory	
2009	Rerrkirrwanga Mununggurr	Gumatj Gurtha	Northern Territory	
2010	Glen Namundja	Kunabibbe Ceremony at Manmoyi	Northern Territory	
2011	Raelene Kerinauia	Kayimwagakimi Jilamara	Northern Territory	
2012	Djirrirra Wunungmurra	Yukuwa	Northern Territory	
2013	Malaluba Gumana	Apudthama	Northern Territory	
2014	Garawan Wanambi	Marrangu.	Northern Territory	
2015	Nonggirrnga Marawili	Lightning in the Rock	Northern Territory	
2016	John Mawurndjul	Lightning in the Rock	Northern Territory	
2017	Nyapanyapa Yunupingu	Lines	Northern Territory	
2018	Napuwarri Marawili	Baraltja Dugong Yathikpa	Northern Territory	
2019	Nonggirrnga Marawili	Lightning strikes	Northern Territory	
2021	Dhambit Munuŋgurr	Bees at Gäṉgän	Northern Territory	
2022	D. Yunupingu	Yunupingu (the rock)	Northern Territory	
2023	Owen Yalandja	Ngalkodjek Yawkyawk	Northern Territory	
2024	Wurrandan Marawili	Rumbal, the body / the truth	Northern Territory	

== Wandjuk Marika 3D Memorial Award (sponsored by Telstra) ==
This award is named after notable bark painter Wandjuk Marika. It was previously known as the Memorial Award for Mawalan's Eldest Son from until 1993.

Year	Artist	Title	Origin	Notes
1987	Baluka Maymuru	Milky Way (Milnguya) and Crocodile	Northern Territory	
1988	Heather Walker	Watching	Queensland	
1989	Paddy Fordham	Balangjalngalan Spirit	Northern Territory	
1990	Bevan Hayward (Pooaraar)	Tweret Spirits, Dingo Spirits, Njoorlum Spirits and Anthropomorphs of Aboriginal Life	Western Australia	
1991	Tjalumi Kulyuru	Pitjantjatjara Batik	South Australia	
1992	David (Malangi) Daymirringu	Gurrmirringu and His Wife	Northern Territory	
1993	Nina Puruntatameri	Turtle & Fish	Northern Territory	
1994	Lena Yarinkura	Family Drama)	Western Australia	
1995	Shawn Dobson	Path of Destruction from the Indigenous Archives	Northern Territory	
1996	Terry Ngamandarra	Hollow-log Bone-coffin with Gulach, Spike Rush Design	Northern Territory	
1997	Lena Yarinkura	Family of Yawkyawk Mermaid	Northern Territory	
1998	Jody Broun	Rainforest Swords and Shields	Western Australia	
1999	Long Tom Tjapanangka	Hunting Party	Northern Territory	
2000	Jeanette James	Jewel of the Sea	Tasmania	
2001	Craig Koomeeta	Saltwater Crocodile	Queensland	
2002	Carol Rontji	Eeranda Pmara Nukanala	Northern Territory	
2003	Lorna Jin-Gubarrangunyia	Conical Fishtrap	Northern Territory	
2004	Timothy Wulandjbirr	Lorrkon Hollow Log	Northern Territory	
2005	Naminapu Maymuru-White	Milngiyawuy	Northern Territory	
2006	Baluka Maymuru	Dhakandjali	Northern Territory	
2007	Laurie Nilsen	Goolburris on the Bungil Creek	Queensland	
2008	Nyapanyapa Yunupingu	Incident at Mutpi (1975)	Yirrkala, Northern Territory	
2009	Janine McAullay Bott	Dhalktj - Bilby	Western Australia	
2010	Wukun Wanambi	Bamurrungu	Yirrkala, Northern Territory	
2011	Gali Yalkarriwuy Gurruwiwi	'Banumbirr (Morning Star poles)	Western Australia	
2012	Jack Nawilil	Namorroddo.	Northern Territory	
2013	Rhonda Sharpe	They come from nowhere.	Alice Springs, Northern Territory	
2014	Alick Tipoti	Kaygasiw Usul (Shovel nose shark dust trail reflected in the heavens as the Milky Way)	Torres Strait Islands, Queensland	
2015	Rhonda Sharpe	Rhonda	Alice Springs, Northern Territory	
2016	Nicole Monks	We are all animals	New South Wales	
2017	Shirley Macnamara	Nyurruga Muulawaddi	Queensland	
2018	Wukun Wanambi	Destiny	Northern Territory	
2019	Malaluba Gumana	Rainbows in the lilies	Northern Territory	
2021	Hubert Pareroultja and Mervyn Rubuntja	Through the veil of time	Western Australia / Northern Territory	
2022	Bonnie Burangarra and Freda Ali Wayartja	An-gujechiya	Northern Territory	
2023	Anne Nginyangka Thompson	Anangu History	South Australia	
2024	Obed Namirrkki	Kunkurra	Northern Territory	

== Telstra Emerging Artist Award ==
The Telstra Youth Award was established in 2014 and was redeveloped into the Telstra Emerging Artist Award in 2017.

Year	Artist	Title	Origin	Notes
2014	Kieren Karritpul	Yerrgi	Northern Territory	
2015	Josh Muir	Buninyong	Victoria	
2016	Ishmael Marika	Sunlight energy II	Northern Territory	
2017	Betty Muffler	Ngangkari Ngura	South Australia	
2018	Matthew Dhamuliya Gurruwiwi	Banumbirr (Morning Star Poles)	Northern Territory	
2019	Titus Nganjmirra	Queen Elizabeth	Northern Territory	
2021	Kyra Mancktelow	Moongalba 11	Queensland	
2022	Louise Malarvie	Pamarr Yara	Western Australia	
2023	Dhalmula Burarrwaŋa	wanha, dhika, nhawi?	Northern Territory	
2024	Josina Pumani	Maralinga	South Australia	

== Telstra People's Choice Award ==
This prize was established in 2007.

Year	Artist	Title	Origin	Notes
2007	Helen McCarthy Tyalmuty	Tyemeny Liman's Wutinggi - Grandpa Harry's Canoe	Northern Territory	
2008	Alick Tipoti	Adhikuyam	Torres Strait Island, Queensland	
2009	Samantha Hobson	Wave Bust...Windy Night	Northern Territory	
2010	Nawurapu Wunungmurra	Mokuy	Northern Territory	
2011	Alisom Riley	Seven sisters	South Australia	
2012	Djirirra Wunungmurra	Yukuwa	Northern Territory	
2013	Marie Pula Holmes	My Country	Northern Territory	
2014	Boneta-Marie Mabo	The Eddie Mabo Stamps	Torres Strait Island, Queensland	
2016	Penny Evans	Trophy wife	New South Wales	
2017	Anniebell Marrngnamarrnga	Pregnant yawkyawk	Northern Territory	
2018	Freda Brady, Maringka Tunkin, Sandra Ken, Tjungkara Ken, Yaritji Young	Seven sisters	South Australia	
2019	Rusty Peters	Garnkin	Western Australia	
2020	Nyunmiti Burton	Ngayuku Ngura	South Australia	
2021	Sally Scales	Wati Tjakura	South Australia	
2022	Juanella McKenzie	Hold me	South Australia	
2023	Emma Singer	Ngayuku Ngura		

== Telstra Multimedia Award ==
This award was established in 2018.

Year	Artist	Title	Origin	Notes
2018	Patrina Liyadurrkitj Mununggurr	Dhunupa'kum nhuna wanda (Straightening your mind)	Northern Territory	
2019	Gutiŋarra Yunupiŋu	Yolŋu sign language (Clan language – Dhuwalandja)	Northern Territory	
2020	Siena Mayutu Wurmarri Stubbs	Shinkansen	Northern Territory	
2021	Pedro Wonaeamirri	Jilarti	Northern Territory	
2022	Jimmy John Thaiday	Beyond the Lines (a video work)	Erub, Torres Strait Islands	
2023	Jimmy John Thaiday	Just Beneath the Surface	Erub, Torres Strait Islands	
2024	Natalie Davey	River Report	Western Australia	

== Discontinued awards ==
=== Museums & Art Galleries Award ===
This prize was first awarded in 1986 and was discontinued in 1995.

Year	Artist	Title	Origin	Notes
1986	Shane Pickett	Three faces of the sun	Western Australia	
1987	Les Mirrikkurriya	Namarrodo Spirit	Northern Territory	
1988	Lin Onus	Night Sky at Garmedi	Victoria	
1989	Milton Bidge	Ration Day, Burnt Bridge	New South Wales	
1990	George Mung Mung	Tarrajayan Country	Western Australia	
1991	Dorothy Napangardi	Wild Black Plum Dreaming	Northern Territory	
1992	Jack Britten (Joolama)	Tickelara Country	Western Australia	
1993	Amy Johnson	Water Birds	Northern Territory	
1994	Elaine Russell	Suppertime	New South Wales	

=== Rothmans Foundation Award ===
The Rothmans Foundation Award was established in 1987 and discontinued in 1994.

Year	Artist	Title	Origin	Notes
1987	Jeannie Egan	Young Men's Dreaming	Northern Territory	
1988	John Mawurndjul	Ngalyod	Northern Territory	
1989	Jimmy Wululu	Niwuda and Naraka Design	Northern Territory	
1990	Ralph Nganjmirra	Nawalabik	Northern Territory	
1991	Les Mirrikkurriya	Borlkjam	Northern Territory	
1992	Aileen Henry	Jilamara, Design	Northern Territory	
1993	Samuel Namundja	Namorrodoh	Northern Territory	
1994	Dundiwuy Wunambi	Wuyal	Northern Territory	

=== Peter Stuyvesant Cultural Foundation Award ===
Year	Artist	Title	Origin	Notes
1986	Bede Tungatalum	Pukumani Poles	Northern Territory	

=== Open Media Award ===
Year	Artist	Title	Origin	Notes
1985	Haye Haywood	Pitjantjatjara Batik	Northern Territory	

=== New Media Award ===
Year	Artist	Title	Origin	Notes
20111985	Ricardo Idagi	Upi Mop Le – Tail end man	"A personal victory dance mask"; in collaboration with filmmaker John Harvey for the video element	
