= Bluethumb Art Gallery =

Bluethumb is an Australian online art marketplace that was started in 2011 by brothers Edward and George Hartley, Bluethumb now exhibits over 20,000 emerging and established Australian artists’ work, including Archibald Prize finalists Kim Leutwyler, Loribelle Spirovski, Julius Killerby and Mertim Gokalp. In November 2015, Bluethumb represented Australia at the Creative Business Cup in Copenhagen after winning QUT Creative Enterprise Australia's Creative3 Pitch.

Since representing Australia in the Creative Business Cup, Bluethumb have secured two rounds of funding. Adam Schwab and Jeremy Same, who are the co-founders of the AussieCommerce Group and Lux Group, invested in 2015, soon after the competition. The funds were used to expand the artwork on the site and invest in technology and marketing. In 2017, Bluethumb secured a capital raise from QUT Creative Enterprise Australia and Grand Prix Capital, with follow on investment from Adam Schwab and Jeremy Same. Bluethumb used this investment to build an ethical and transparent gallery platform for Indigenous art centres to sell their artists' work online.

== Bluethumb Art Prize ==
The Bluethumb Art Prize' was established in 2016. It is free to enter and submissions are online, with the artists able to change their artwork entry at any time before entries close. Art is for sale throughout the exhibition process. By eliminating many of the usual hurdles artists face when entering prizes, the inaugural Bluethumb Art Prize was well received and had more entries than that year's Archibald Prize. The 2016/2017 winner of the $10,000 prize was Kirsten Sivyer with a surrealist painting titled Home Away From Home. The runner-up was Jimmy Donegan, the 2010 National Aboriginal & Torres Strait Islander Art Award winner, with his painting The Pukara Rock Hole.

The Bluethumb Art Prize 18 was launched late 2017. It received 2,346 entries, double that of the inaugural year, making it Australia's biggest new art prize. Four category awards were added, each valued at $2,000: Works on Canvas and Board, Works on Paper, Photography and Other Media. The highest scoring artwork of these four category winners received the overall prize of $10,000. In addition to these prizes, all finalists were eligible for the People's Choice Award, voted for by the public online. Melbourne-based artist Kim Hyunji won the Works on Canvas award and the $10,000 overall Bluethumb Art Prize with her oil painting, Painless (Luke). She also went on to win the People's Choice. The winner of the Works on Paper Award was Erin Nicholls for Smoke, Illawanti Ungkutjuru Ken, of Tjanpi Desert Weavers, won the Other Media Award for her woven basket Patupiri Wiltja, while Alice Blanch received the Photography Award for her mysterious, moody piece, A Shifting Stillness #4.

== Bluethumb - Uncover Australian Art app ==
In November 2013 Bluethumb released the Bluethumb – Uncover Australian Art app for iOS and Android. It is the first Australian art app to allow visual artists to sell their artwork directly through an app and won Best Shopping App in the Australian Mobile & App Design Awards 2014.

== See also ==
- SALA Festival
- List of Art museums and galleries in Australia
