= Scales (surname) =

The surname Scales has more than one possible origin.

In some cases, the surname may originate from a name for someone who lived near huts or sheds. In such cases, the surname is derived from the Middle English scale, schole, scole, meaning "(temporary) hut, shed, shieling" (from Old Scandinavian skáli). The surname may also originate from a specific place name of the same meaning, such as Scole (Norfolk), or from various other places called Scales or Scholes, mainly in northern England. The surname first appeared on record in Ireland, in Limerick, in the fourteenth century. The surname can be rendered in Irish as de Scéalas.

In other cases, the surname originates from a place name in France. In such cases, it is derived from Écalles-Alix in Seine-Maritime, or from Escalles in Pas-de-Calais.

People with the surname include:

- Alfred Moore Scales (1827–1892), American politician from North Carolina and Confederate Army general
- Derek P. Scales (1921–2004), Australian literary scholar
- Dwight Scales (born 1953), American football player
- George Scales (1900–1976), American baseball player and manager
- Harvey Scales (1940–2019), American singer, songwriter, and producer
- Helen Scales, British marine biologist
- John Scales (born 1966), English football player
- John N. Scales (born 1932), American politician from Pennsylvania
- Junius Scales (1920–2002), American communist
- Patrick Scales (American football) (born 1988), American football player
- Patrick Scales (musician) (born 1965), German bass player
- Prunella Scales (1932–2025), English actor
- Robert H. Scales (1944–2024), American major general
- Sally Scales (born 1989), Australian artist, and arts coordinator
- Tegray Scales (born 1996), American football player
- Thomas Scales (1786–1860), British abolitionist
- Baron Scales, a title in the Peerage of England, including a list of people named de Scales

== See also ==
- Charley Scalies (1940–2025), American actor
