= Gorman (brand) =

Australian fashion label

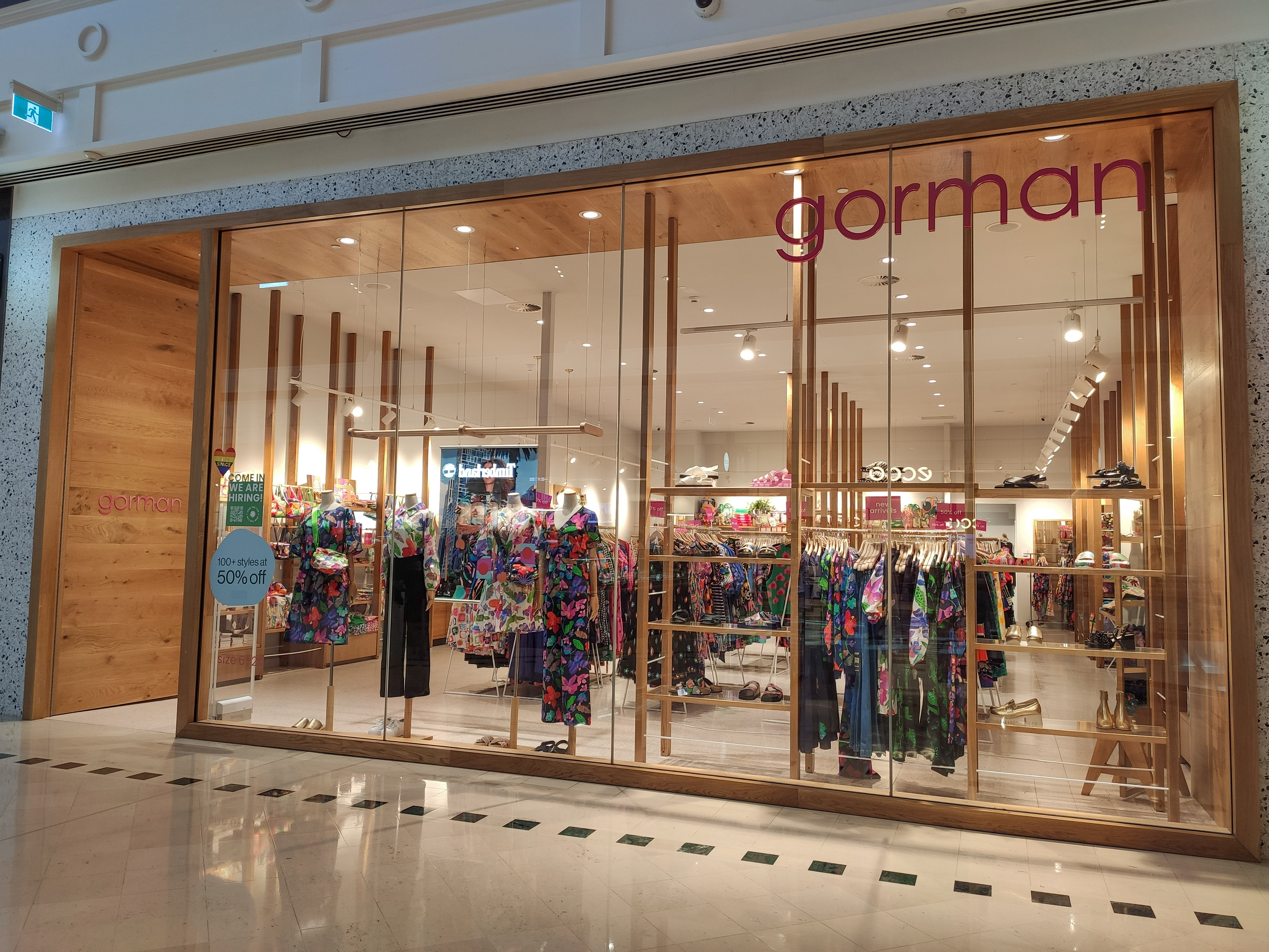
- Gorman store in Karrinyup Shopping Centre
- Type: Private
- Industry: Retail; Fashion
- Founded: 1999; 27 years ago
- Founder: Lisa Gorman
- Website: gormanshop.com.au

Gorman is an Australian women's fashion label founded by Lisa Gorman in 1999. It sells clothing items for women.

== History ==
Gorman was launched in 1999 by Lisa Gorman, with the collection ‘Less Than 12 Degrees’ at the now-defunct fat 52 boutique. By 2003, the label was stocked in 55 retailers in Australia and 15 in Japan. The first Gorman boutique opened in 2004 in Prahran, Melbourne. In 2010, the company was purchased by Factory X, and by the mid-2010s, Gorman was considered a well recognized Australian clothing brand, with fans of the brand referring to themselves as “Gormies”.

By November 2021, the brand had more than 50 stores located throughout Australia.

== Brand collections ==
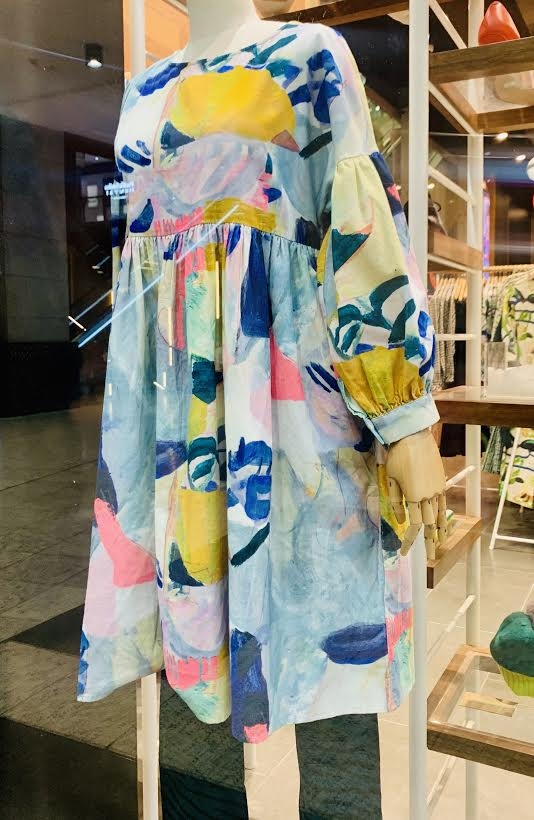
A Gorman dress, as seen in the front window of its store at The Galeries, Sydney

The label is known for its collaborations with Australian and international artists as part of each seasonal collection. These artists include: Atelier Bingo, Mirka Mora, Miranda Skoczek, Monika Forsberg, Liz Payne, Dana Kinter, Elke Kramer, Miso, Rhys Lee, Rachel Castle, Ellie Malin, Alexander Kori Girard and Cornelia O’Donovan. The Gorman 2019 Mangkaja collection collaborated with Aboriginal artists Ngarralja Tommy May (2020 winner of the Telstra Award) and Sonia Kurarra from Fitzroy Crossing in Western Australia's far north.

In 2021, Lisa Gorman retired as the brand's creative director.

== Manufacturing ==
In 2016, the Gorman label received negative publicity after Factory X featured on Oxfam’s annual “Naughty List” for not disclosing its suppliers. In April that year, the brand attracted additional criticism when it received an “F” in the Baptist World Aid fashion report for choosing not to participate in the survey.

The brand responded with the statement “Gorman's decision not to publicly disclose the identity of its manufacturers is not “naughty”. [The] Gorman team have worked closely with their manufacturers on the development of techniques, trims and treatments that are key to Gorman's point-of-difference in the marketplace. We are currently not prepared to share the details of our manufacturers with our competitors”.

In subsequent years, Gorman has worked with charitable organizations which compile these lists and has received "B" grades.
