= Comparative Literary Studies: An Introduction =

1973 book by Siegbert Salomon Prawer

- Editors: Siegbert Salomon Prawer
- Language: English
- Subject: comparative literature
- Publisher: Duckworth Books
- Media type: Print (Hardcover)
- Pages: 180 pp.
- ISBN: 978-0064956987

Comparative Literary Studies: An Introduction is a 1973 textbook by Siegbert Salomon Prawer in which the author provides an introduction to comparative literature.

== Reception ==
Alireza Anoushirvani (from Shiraz University) calls the book one of the most authentic books taught in Western universities. In a review published in AUMLA, Derek P. Scales (from the ANU) writes: "One cannot but be impressed by the range of Professor Prawer's reading, his familiarity with so many works in various literatures which have been the subject of comparative studies, and his awareness of what has been written by so many scholars in the fields designated by his several chapter headings".
