= Jukuja Dolly Snell =

Australian Aboriginal artist (1933–2015)

- Died: 30 December 2015
- Occupation: Artist
- Awards: National Aboriginal & Torres Strait Islander Art Award (NATSIAA)

Jukuja Dolly Snell (born c. 1933 – 30 December 2015) was an artist from Western Australia, who won the 2015 Telstra National Aboriginal and Torres Strait Islander Art Award.

== Biography ==
Snell was born in 1933, near a jila called Kurtal. Her father was Lawalawa, the custodian of Kurtal. A painting by Ngarralja Tommy May (2020 winner of the Telstra Award) shows Lawalawa in death, left at a waterhole called Jitirr by his family as he was too weak to travel further. In 2007, Snell painted Jitirr.

After the death of her father, she and her mother moved around the region, visiting places which included Balgo, Warnku, Louisa Downs Station, Bohemia Downs Station and Christmas Creek Station. They spoke the Wangkatjungka language. In later life she remembered seeing a white man and a sheep for the first time. The movement out of the desert by many became known as the Walmajarri diaspora. Whilst she was working at the stations with her mother, she met her husband Nyirlpirr Spider Snell. They were together for many years until they officially married in 1986 at Burawa Mission. They had two children, Henry and Dorothy, as well as adopting the artist Lisa Uhl. Dorothy went on to have eight children, who Dolly helped look after; these grandchildren referred to Dolly as the 'Kurtal Queen'.

== Artistic career ==
Snell began painting in the 1980s as a result of Australian governmental investment in Aboriginal education. She was one of the founding members of Karrayili Adult Education Centre and later Mangkaja Arts Resource Agency. Her influence was felt as she became known as one of the artists that shaped the surge in interest in Aboriginal art in the 1990s.

=== Exhibitions ===
Snell's work was first shown in 1991 in Karrayili at Tandanya, Adelaide. In 1993, her work was part of 'Images of Power: Aboriginal Art of the Kimberley' at the National Gallery of Victoria. In 1994, her works displayed in 'This is my country', a Mangkaja Arts Group exhibition held at Artspace, Claremont, part of the Festival of Perth. She was also part of the group of artists who painted the giant canvas Ngurrara II in 1997. In 2007, she was part of an international group show in 2009 organised by Ildiko Kovacs, entitled 'Sitting Down with Jukuja and Wakarta'. The artists worked alongside each other for three weeks, learning before presenting their work together. Her first solo show was in Darwin in 2014 at the Outstation Gallery, and was called 'Kurtal: New Work by Dolly Snell'.

=== In film ===
Snell featured in the 2015 documentary Putuparri and the Rainmakers, which was directed by Nicole Ma. In it, her grandson Tom narrates the struggles of the people of the area to have their claim to their ancestral lands constituted.

=== Telstra Award ===
In 2015, Snell was awarded the Telstra National Aboriginal and Torres Strait Islander Art Award for her painting Kurtal, which depicts the place she was born. Whilst painting Kurtal, Snell sang songs she was taught by her grandmother. It took three weeks to paint.

She was a leader of women's ceremonial law in the Wangkatjungka community. She died on 30 December 2015 in Fitzroy Crossing.

=== Themes ===
Snell's paintings revolve around themes close to the country around Kurtal. They include: the jila (waterhole), jilji (sandhills) and surrounding country in the Great Sandy Desert. She also paints mangarri (bush tucker) and local plants. Her work is known for its bright colours and bold style.

=== Work in public collections ===
- Art Gallery of New South Wales: Living Water, Kurtal.
- National Museum of Australia: Jitirr; Kartamarti.
- National Gallery of Victoria: Jitirr; Untitled; Kalpartujarra.
- Artbank, Sydney: various.
- Flinders University Museum of Art
