= Betty Muffler =

Aboriginal Australian artist and healer

Betty Muffler is an Aboriginal Australian artist and ngangkari (healer). She is a senior artist at Iwantja Arts, in Indulkana in Aṉangu Pitjantjatjara Yankunytjatjara (APY Lands), South Australia, known for a series of works on large linen canvases called Ngangkari Ngura (Healing Country).

== Early life ==
Muffler was born near Watarru, South Australia, in 1944, of the Pitjantjatjara and Yankunytjatjara peoples. She refers to a place called Yalungu, south of Waturru, as her land, where emus visit a waterhole. She grew up at the Ernabella Mission in Pukatja in the aftermath of the British nuclear tests at Maralinga and Operation Totem at Emu Field in the late 1950s and early 1960s. Seeing the deaths and dislocation caused by the tests has inspired much of her artwork, and she has expressed healing as a recurrent theme in her work.

== Artistic career ==
Muffler only started to paint late in life, joining the artists at Iwantja Arts in Indulkana. She works in several mediums, notably painting, drawing, printmaking and sculpture. Her personal tjukurpa (a complex concept, often translated as The Dreaming) is the emu, but her artwork also embodies other elements of her culture's tjukurpa. Many of her paintings are identically titled, Ngangkari Ngura (Healing Country), and use acrylic paint on linen. They all depict her Country, and a connection to her songlines.

She attended law and culture events held by the Ngaanyatjarra Pitjantjatjara Yankunytjatjara (NPY) Women’s Council, where she learnt to weave tjanpi baskets, subsequently making large baskets for Tjanpi Desert Weavers.

Muffler won "Best emerging artist" at the National Aboriginal and Torres Strait Islander Art Awards (a.k.a. NATSIAA awards) in 2017, with Ngangkaṟi Ngura (Healing Country).

Nici Cumpston, curator of Aboriginal and Torres Strait Islander Art and artistic director of the Tarnanthi exhibitions at the Art Gallery of South Australia (AGSA) in Adelaide, regards Muffler's "meteoric rise" as well-deserved, and included Muffler's work in the 2020 Open Hands exhibition, which was dedicated to the work of senior women artists in remote communities.

Muffler's work was featured on the cover of the September 2020 issue of Vogue Australia, in the form of specially-commissioned work, another iteration of Ngangkaṟi Ngura (Healing Country). The work was commissioned in collaboration with the National Gallery of Australia, during the early months of the COVID-19 pandemic in Australia, as part of a global campaign called "Vogue Hope". The work featured on Vogue was hung in the Know My Name exhibition at the National Gallery of Australia, having been gifted to the gallery by Vogue Australia.

== Healing practice ==
Her traditional healing, or ngangkari, practice was taught to her by her aunties on her father's side of the family, and she uses her healing talents to work with the NPY Women’s Council and other medical practitioners on the APY Lands. She has also worked in hospitals in Adelaide, Coober Pedy, Whyalla and Alice Springs, helping to heal the spirits of anangu. She says that she doesn't always need to travel physically to the person, because her eagle spirit can fly across the desert looking for sick people. Her renown as a healer caused high demand for her work during the COVID-19 pandemic, to help heal anxiety in the APY Lands.

== Other roles ==
Muffler is a director for Iwantja Arts, and a cultural advisor to the APY Collective, which comprises ten Indigenous-owned artistic enterprises.

== Recognition and awards ==
- 2017: Winner, Telstra Emerging Artist Award at the National Aboriginal and Torres Strait Islander Art Awards (NATSIAA)
- 2018: Finalist, John Fries Award
- 2020: Finalist, Wynne Prize at the Art Gallery of New South Wales
- 2022: Winner, Telstra General Painting Award at NATSIAA

== Collections and exhibitions ==
- Australian War Memorial, Ngangkari Ngura (Healing Country) (2017)
- Tarnanthi 2020: Open Hands at the Art Gallery of South Australia, Ngangkari Ngura (Healing Country) (2020), a series of paintings
- The National 2021: New Australian Art at the Art Gallery of New South Wales, Ngangkaṟi Ngura (Healing Country) (2020), with Maringka Burton

== Personal life ==
Muffler married a man from Iwantja, and has two sons and a daughter there as well as family in Coober Pedy, and many grandchildren.
