= Harold Thomas (artist) =

Australian artist and activist (born 1947)

Harold Joseph Thomas
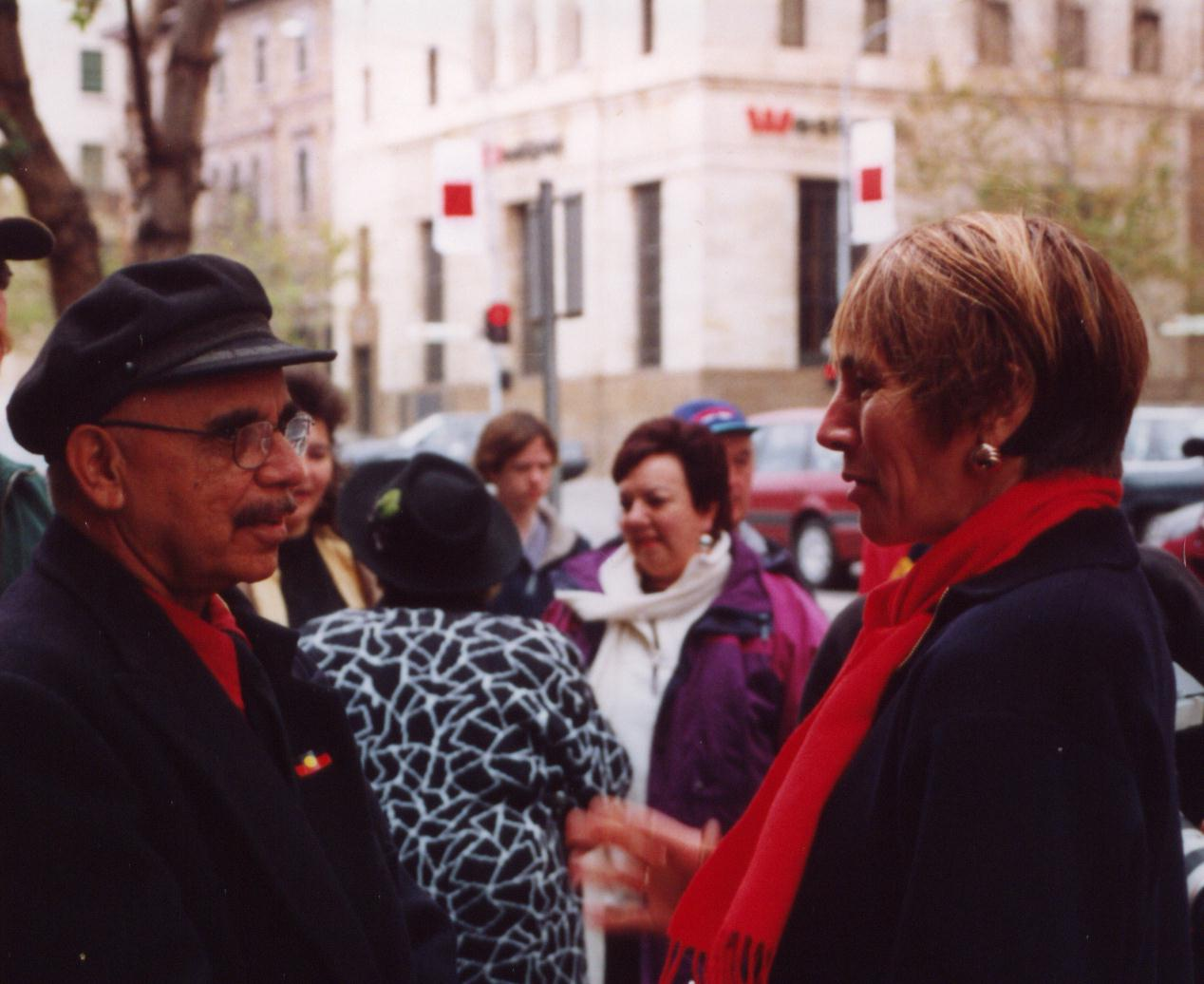
- Harold Thomas with Jane Lomax-Smith in Adelaide commemorating the 30th anniversary of the Australian Aboriginal flag, 8 July 2001
- Born: 1947 (age 78–79); Alice Springs, Northern Territory, Australia
- Education: South Australian School of Art
- Notable work: Australian Aboriginal flag

Harold Joseph Thomas (born 1947), also known as Bundoo, is an Aboriginal Australian artist and former activist, known for designing and copyrighting the Australian Aboriginal flag. He claims to have designed the flag in 1971 as a symbol of the Aboriginal land rights movement, and in 1995 it was made an official "Flag of Australia". After this, his assertion of copyright over his design was upheld by the Federal Court, eventually transferring that copyright to the Commonwealth of Australia and making it freely available for public use in January 2022.

== Early life and education ==
Harold Joseph Thomas (Bundoo) was born in 1947 to a Wombai father and Luritja mother in Alice Springs, Northern Territory. He was one of 13 children but the family did not all live under one roof as the children were taken from there at different stages. He remembers drawing and painting on pieces of paper from an early age.

At seven years old, he was removed from his family as part of the Stolen Generations and was taken to St Francis House, in South Australia, where he lived until he was eleven. He was later fostered by Reverend Donald Wallace and his family, who enroled him at Willunga High School. He attended an Adelaide independent school, Pulteney Grammar.

In 1966, aged 17, Thomas won a scholarship to study at the South Australian School of Art, graduating with Honours in 1969, becoming the first Aboriginal person to graduate from an Australian art school. While there he studied watercolor painting under Reg Campbell who he remembered as being a eccentric teacher. In 1968 he held his first exhibition of watercolour paintings in Adelaide, which was opened by then premier Don Dunstan.

It was while he was studying that he became involved in the civil rights movement.

== Art practice and career ==
In 1970, he was the first Aboriginal person to be employed at the South Australian Museum, working as a survey artist. This gave him access to a huge collection of Aboriginal artefacts as well as a wide range of art.

His main artistic influences include painters Caravaggio, Francisco Goya and Eugène Delacroix.

In 1972, he moved to Humpty Doo, nearby to Darwin, and started painting the landscape and wildlife, especially watercolours. He changed his subject matter and style dramatically in 2016, when he started painting representations of Aboriginal people's first and subsequent contact with European colonisers, including the frontier wars.

In 2016 his painting Tribal Abduction, a scene of an Aboriginal baby being torn from their mother's breast by police, depicting a scene relating to the Stolen Generations (of which he is a member,) won the top prize of A$50,000, the Telstra Art Award, in the 33rd Telstra National Aboriginal and Torres Strait Islander Art Awards (NATSIAAs).

The Australian Aboriginal flag as designed by Harold Thomas.

== Australian Aboriginal flag ==
Thomas says he designed the flag in 1970 to lead a demonstration at the NADOC (now NAIDOC) march. It was first flown at a land rights rally on 9 July 1971 in Adelaide, South Australia, as a symbol of the Aboriginal land rights movement. In 1972 it was adopted by the Aboriginal Tent Embassy in Canberra.

In 1991, he created a number of watercolour paintings for a set of limited prints to celebrate 20 years of the flag.

On 14 July 1995 the flag was made an official "Flag of Australia". In 1997 Thomas was involved in a high-profile case in the Federal Court and the High Court, to assert copyright over his design. The outcome was that he was declared the copyright owner of the flag's design, according to copyright law of Australia.

In 2010 Thomas was involved in a dispute with Google over its intended use of a 12-year-old Australian girl's artwork incorporating the Australian Aboriginal flag into its logo. Thomas refused to allow Google to use the image featuring the flag after negotiations over compensation failed. Thomas claimed that Google had opened negotiations with a request for free use of the flag and, while he allowed free use to non-commercial operations that gave health, educational, legal and other assistance to Aboriginal people, he charged a fee to commercial operations.

Thomas went on to give exclusive commercial rights to three companies, "one to reproduce flags, and the others to reproduce the image on objects and clothing". One of these companies, WAM Clothing, issued infringement notices to various organisations, including the AFL, NRL, and Aboriginal non-profits.

On 21 December 2021 Thomas created the authentic digital representation of the flag, minted as a non-fungible token (NFT) to commemorate the 50th year of the flag. On 25 January 2022, after three years of negotiation, Thomas assigned the copyright of the flag to the Commonwealth of Australia, in a deal that makes it free for public use by anybody. He said he hoped that the democratisation of the flag would "provide comfort to all Aboriginal people and Australians to use the flag". In February 2022 it was revealed that the Morrison government paid A$13.75m to Thomas to assume copyright. It also paid A$6.3m to two non-Indigenous businesses who held licences to use the flag.

== Other work ==
In 1972, Thomas illustrated Tales told to Kabbarli: Aboriginal legends collected by Daisy Bates (stories collected by author Daisy Bates, retold by Barbara Ker Wilson). He also did the illustrations for Jagardoo: Poems from Aboriginal Australia (1977), by Jack Davis, and Kurkali the Lizard (1994), a children's picture book by Charlie Stream.

In 1973-4, he produced and directed a mythological play called Pelicans Dream.

In 1995, he was chair of the Northern Territory Stolen Generation Committee.

== Recognition and awards ==
- 1971: honorary degree in social anthropology from the University of Adelaide
- 1984: work selected to hang in the inaugural NATSIAA award exhibition
- 1985: work selected to hang in the 2nd NATSIAA award exhibition
- 1987: official portrait artist for Northern Territory Government; paintings administrators and chief ministers put on display at Parliament House, Darwin
- 2016: Tribal Abduction, Telstra Art Award, in the 33rd NATSIAAs
- 2017: Myal Creek Massacre, a painting depicting the 1838 Myall Creek massacre in New South Wales, selected as a finalist in the NATSIAA Awards
- 2017: Tribal Abduction hung in the foyer of Charles Darwin University
- 2023: received an Honorary Doctor of Arts from Charles Darwin University in recognition of his contribution to fine arts and Aboriginal rights activism

== Personal life ==
Thomas has lived in Humpty Doo in Northern Territory, near Darwin, since the 1990s.

== Selected exhibitions ==
- 1986: New Works, Framed Gallery, Darwin, Northern Territory
- 1987: Northern Light, Birukmarri Gallery, Fremantle
- 1990: group exhibition, Balance
- 1990: Views, Visions, Influences, Queensland Art Gallery, Brisbane
- 1991: prints, at Tandanya, Adelaide, South Australia
- 1991: prints, at Sydney Opera House
- 1993: 10th NATSIAA exhibition, Museum and Art Gallery of the Northern Territory; "Bungalo Boy" purchased by the museum
