= Yinarupa Nangala =

Australian artist

- Born: c. 1961
- Movement: Papunyatula

Yinarupa Nangala (born c. 1961 or c. 1958) is a Pintupi from Western Australia. just west of the Kiwirrkurra community. Her works are held in major art collections including the Art Gallery of NSW, Museum and Art Gallery of the Northern Territory, and the National Gallery of Victoria.

== Career ==
Nangala began to paint in 1996, when her children were older. In the late 2000s, she began to be recognised for her classic Pintupi painting style.

In 2009, Nangala won the Telstra General Painting Award at the National Aboriginal and Torres Strait Islander Art Awards held in The Northern Territory. In 2008, 2014, 2015 and 2016 she was a finalist in the same award.

In 2010 she received an honourable mention at the 36th Alice Art Prize. In 2014 she was a finalist in the Wynne Prize at the Art Gallery of NSW.

Yinarupa has held solo as well as group exhibitions. Her works are held in major art collections including the Art Gallery of NSW, Museum and Art Gallery of the Northern Territory, and the National Gallery of Victoria.

== Works ==
Nangala paints her traditional land, specifically areas that are important to the Pintupi women and their ceremonies. Many of the sacred designs are related to the rock-hole site of Mukula (near Juniper Well in Western Australia) and the rock-hole site of Marrapinti (west of the Pollock Hills in Western Australia). Her designs are also associated with the women gathering bushfoods such as the kampurarrpa berries (desert raisin, Solanum centrale) and pura (bush tomato, Solanum chippendalei). The ‘U’ shapes in the paintings represent the women while the circles represent the berries.

== Personal life ==
Nangala is the daughter of the late Anatjari Tjampitjinpa, founding member of the Papunya Tula art movement. Her late husband was Yala Yala Gibbs Tjungurrayi, also a Papunya Tula artist.
