= NPY Women's Council =

Women's community organisation in central Australia

The Ngaanyatjarra, Pitjantjatjara and Yankunytjatjara Women's Council (NPY Women's Council, NPYWC) is a community-based community organisation formed in 1980 delivering services to the Ngaanyatjarra, Pitjantjatjara and Yankunytjatjara women in the central desert region of Australia across the borders of the Northern Territory, South Australia, Western Australia with its headquarters in Alice Springs. It provides a range of community, family, research and advocacy services.

It addresses the common interests and family and cultural connections of women and their communities in its area of coverage, being:

- Anangu Pitjantjatjara Yankunytjatjara (APY) Lands in South Australia;
- the Ngaanyatjarra Lands (including the Shire of Ngaanyatjarraku) both leasehold and native title lands in Western Australia; and
- Imanpa, Mutitjulu, Kaltukatjara and Aputula in the Northern Territory.

The Women's Council has been an advocate of the Northern Territory Emergency Response.

== Awards ==
The NPY Women's Council has achieved recognition for its work, awards include:

- winner of the 2012 Indigenous Governance Awards presented by Reconciliation Australia and BHP Billiton
- Deadly Awards
  - 2012 Outstanding Achievement in Cultural Advancement Tjanpi Desert Weavers (also the 2005 Telstra National Aboriginal & Torres Strait Islander Art Award
  - 2011 Outstanding Achievement in Aboriginal & Torres Strait Islander Health No Safe Amount – The effects of alcohol in pregnancy (NPYWC Child Nutrition Program) (also a campaign finalist with Halo Productions for the Australian Film and Animation Festival and Highly Commended at the National Drug and Alcohol Awards)
- 2011 International Sigmund Freud Prize from the City of Vienna to the Ngangkari (traditional healers) program (also the 2009 Mark Sheldon Prize from the Royal Australian and New Zealand College of Psychiatrists (RANZCP) and 2009 Dr Margaret Tobin Award for excellence in the provision of mental health services to those most in need)
- 2005 Women in Community Policing Award, Australasian Policewomen’s conference, Darwin
- 2000 Human Rights and Equal Opportunity Commission Award to NPY Women’s Council in the Community Sector
