= Siegbert Salomon Prawer =

Literary scholar (1925–2012)

S. S. Prawer FBA
- Born: Siegbert Salomon Prawer; 15 February 1925; Cologne, Germany
- Died: 5 April 2012 (aged 87); Oxford, England
- Spouse: Helga Schaefer (m. 1949; died 2002)

Academic background
- Education: Jesus College, Cambridge; Christ's College, Cambridge; University of Birmingham
- Thesis: A Critical Analysis of 24 Consecutive Poems from Heine's Romanzero (1953)
- Academic advisor: Brian Downs
- Influences: Roy Pascal

Academic work
- Discipline: Literature
- Sub-discipline: Comparative literature; German literature
- Institutions: University of Birmingham; Westfield College, London; Queen's College, Oxford

Siegbert Salomon Prawer FBA (15 February 1925 – 5 April 2012) was Taylor Professor of the German Language and Literature at the University of Oxford.

== Life and works ==
Prawer was born on 15 February 1925 in Cologne, Germany, to Jewish parents Marcus and Eleanora (Cohn) Prawer. Marcus was a lawyer from Poland and Eleanora's father was cantor of Cologne's largest synagogue. His sister Ruth was born in 1927. The family fled the Nazi regime in 1939, emigrating to Britain.

Educated at King Henry VIII School, Coventry, and Jesus College, Cambridge, he was lecturer at the University of Birmingham from 1948 to 1963, Professor of German at Westfield College, London, from 1964, and became Taylor Professor of the German Language and Literature at the University of Oxford in 1969. He was awarded his PhD by Birmingham University in 1953 (PhD, University of Birmingham, Department of German, 1953, 'A critical analysis of 24 consecutive poems from Heine's Romanzero').

He was a Fellow (then an Honorary Fellow) of Queen's College, Oxford, and an Honorary Fellow of Jesus College, Cambridge.

He had academic interests in German poetry and lieder, Romantic German literature, especially E. T. A. Hoffmann and Heinrich Heine, comparative literature and also in film, particularly horror films.

His sister was the writer Ruth Prawer Jhabvala. He made a cameo appearance in the Merchant-Ivory film Howards End (for which his sister wrote the Academy Award-winning screenplay).

Prawer died on 5 April 2012 in Oxford, England.

== Publications ==
- 1952: German Lyric Poetry: a critical analysis of selected poems from Klopstock to Rilke. London: Routledge & Kegan Paul
- 1960: Mörike und seine Leser. Stuttgart: Ernst Klett
- 1960: Heine. Buch der Lieder. London: Edward Arnold
- 1961: Heine the Tragic Satirist: a study of the later poetry 1827-56. Cambridge: Cambridge University Press
- 1964: Penguin Book of Lieder. Harmondsworth: Penguin Books, editor and translator
- 1969: Essays in German Culture, Language and Society. London: University of London, editor with R. Hinton Thomas, Leonard Wilson Forster, Roy Pascal
- 1970: Heine's Shakespeare: a study on contexts: inaugural lecture delivered before the University of Oxford on 5 May 1970. Oxford: Clarendon Press
- 1970: The Romantic Period in Germany: essays by members of the London University Institute of Germanic Studies, editor
- 1971: Seventeen Modern German Poets. London: Oxford University Press, editor
- 1973: Comparative Literary Studies: An Introduction. London: Duckworth
- 1976: Karl Marx and World Literature. Oxford: Clarendon Press
- 1980: Caligari's Children: the film as tale of terror. Oxford: Oxford University Press
- 1983: Heine's Jewish comedy: a study of his portraits of Jews and Judaism. Oxford: Clarendon Press
- 1984: A. N. Stencl, Poet of Whitechapel. Oxford: Oxford Centre for Postgraduate Hebrew studies. 1st Stencl Lecture
- 1984: Coal-Smoke and Englishmen: a study of verbal caricature in the writings of Heinrich Heine. London: Institute of Germanic Studies, University of London
- 1986: Frankenstein's Island: England and the English in the writings of Heinrich Heine. Cambridge: Cambridge University Press
- 1992: Israel at Vanity Fair: Jews and Judaism in the Writings of W. M. Thackeray. Leiden: Brill
- 1997: Breeches and Metaphysics: Thackeray's German discourse. Oxford: Legenda
- 2000: W. M. Thackeray's European Sketch Books: a study of literary and graphic portraiture. Oxford, New York: P. Lang
- 2002: The Blue Angel. (BFI Film Classics.) London: British Film Institute
- 2004: Nosferatu: Phantom der Nacht. (BFI Film Classics.) London: British Film Institute
- 2005: Between Two Worlds: the Jewish presence in German and Austrian film, 1919-1933. (Film Europa: German Cinema in an International Context) New York, Oxford: Berghahn Books
- 2009: A Cultural Citizen of the World: Sigmund Freud's knowledge and use of British and American writings. Oxford: Legenda

Awards
Preceded by Włodzimierz Brus	Deutscher Memorial Prize; 1977	Succeeded by Rudolf Bahro
