= Baluka Maymuru =

Australian artist

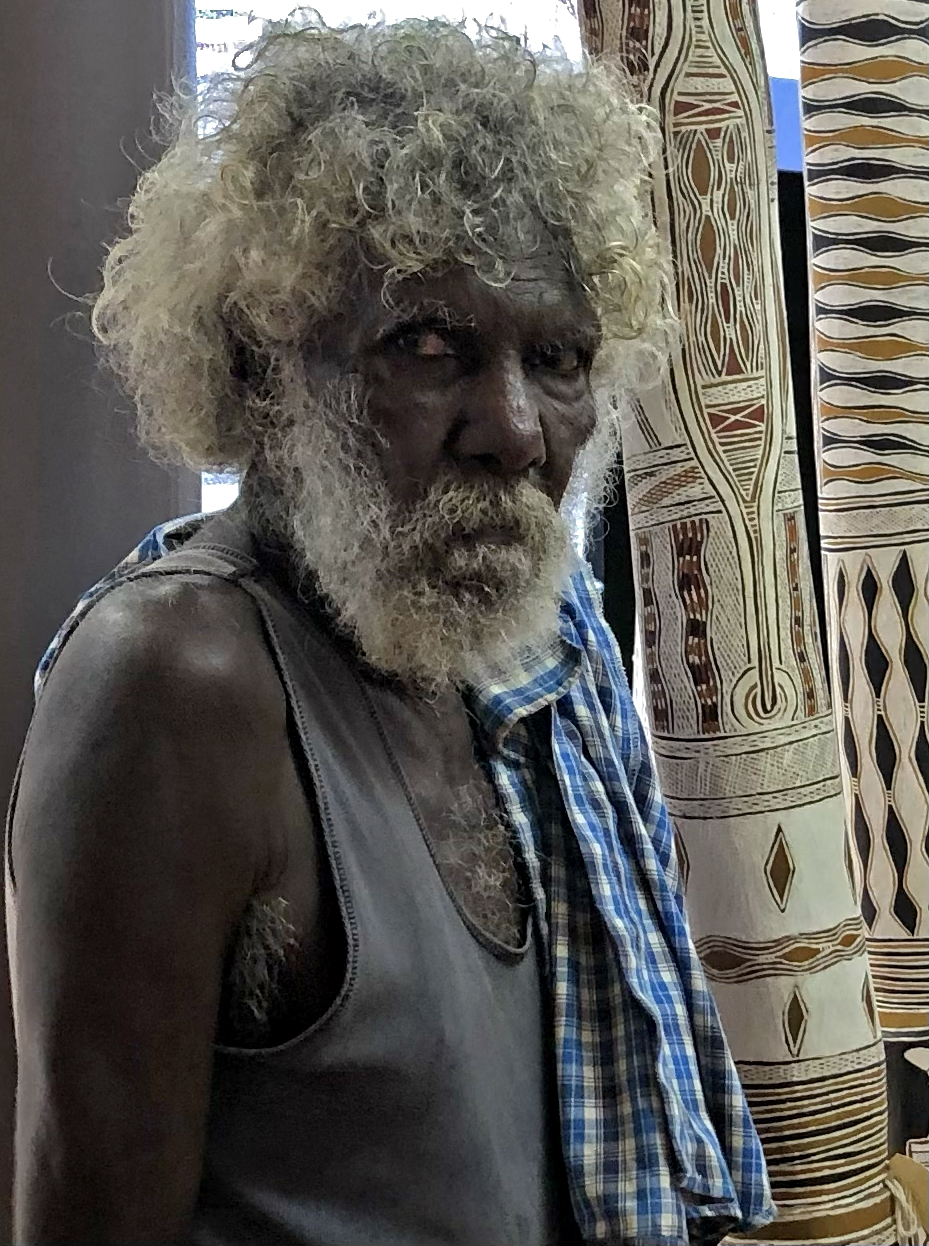
- Born: 1947; Yirrkala, Australia
- Died: 2024 (aged 76–77); Yirrkala
- Resting place: Yirrkala
- Children: Paul Wutjin Maymuru
- Father: Nänyin Maymuru

Baluka Maymuru (1947–2024) was an Aboriginal Australian artist from Yirrkala, Australia. He was the head of the Manggalili clan. Baluka was clan leader of the Belaŋ group of these people; in unison, he belongs to the Yirritja moiety, affirming his responsibilities in ceremony and his artistic freedom within the Yolŋu society. He was the son of artist Nänyin' Maymuru and the nephew of Narritjin Maymuru, one of the most significant painters of Yirrkala.

The artworks of the Maymuru family represent the creation of their country, Djarrakpi. The creation stories present in the bark paintings of Narritjin and his son Banapana are realized in Baluka's sculptures.

== Personal life ==
Based on tradition, the senior men of the clan titled goli'mi (translated to captain), were responsible for distributing food, primarily meat, to through the clan. As one of the senior men, Maymuru was often in charge of distributing turtle or dugong meat.

In 2013, Maymuru sent a live turtle to Yilpara instead of attending a ceremony. He sent it to a senior painter, Bakulangay Marawili, so that he could share it with his community. Maymuru showed the importance of turtles by including them in his paintings, such as Mangalili Monuk.

== Career ==
Maymuru was a sculptor, painter and printmaker. His paintings are done on bark with natural pigments. He mostly painted images that represented the saltwater homeland of Djarrakpi near Cape Shield.

Maymuru contributed bark painting to the Saltwater project, which was an effort by the Yolngu people of north east Arnhem Land to affirm ownership of the saltwater coastline. Those saltwater paintings were used as evidence in the Blue Mud Bay case. His artworks of sea-country clearly demonstrate the natural and deep relationship between land, sea, and water. His pole installation for the Blue Mud Bay sea rights claim shows water as a circulating force and a connector. The water images incorporate the rivers and currents of Blue Mud Bay, the stars of the Milky Way (represented as a river that crosses the sky), the rain-producing cumulo-nimbus clouds, and the mangrove leaves, which combine fresh and salt water to create a life-sustaining wet environment. In July 2008, a landmark High Court of Australia judgement recognised that the traditional owners had control over access to the coastal waters along approximately 80% of the Northern Territory's coastline. The traditional paintings were deemed with legal title deeds equivalent to the sea rights in the intertidal zones from the low-mark tide to the high-mark tide. The legal argument was successful in proving that sacred sites exist in the material and spiritual dimensions for both sea and land.

Maymuru’s bark painting Yingapungapu (1986), in the National Gallery of Victoria collection, depicts these sacred designs of ancestral beings used in funeral ceremonies. There is a sand sculpture and canoe seen in the painting. Representations of the cycle of death and cultivation are seen in the Manggalili art.

Baluka was also one of the handful of artists to have produced work for both the 1996 John W. Kluge commission and the 2017-19 Kluge-Ruhe Maḏayin commission. Baluka curated the Manggalili clan section of the exhibition Maḏayin: Eight Decades of Aboriginal Australian Bark Painting from Yirrkala and contributed the essay "Dhuwala Romdja Balanyaya Malanynha | This Law We Hold" to the exhibition catalogue. As the artist representing his clan, Baluka feels a responsibility of upholding and passing on Yolŋu law, particularly through his paintings. This duty reflects his connection to his clan and homeland as well as an international position — one delegated to share heritage in these exhibitions.

In 2003, Maymuru collaborated with Djambawa Marawili and Gawirrin Gumana to produce a ḻarrakitj for a fellow clan member.

He won the Wandjuk Marika 3D Memorial Award at the National Aboriginal & Torres Strait Islander Art Awards in 1987 and 2006.

== Notable artworks ==
One of the artworks by Maymuru was Mangalili Monuk, a bark painting created in 1998. The painting features the ancestors Dulawarri and Bargarrnal (dingoes), Guthiny (rat), Galayarr (heron), Balin (barramundi) Gayitj (the lightning serpent), Minyga (garfish), Makani (queenfish), Balamaynu (hawkesbill turtle), Yambirrku (parrot fish), Getkit (terns) and Gopu (tuna). It represents the natural world that Maymuru lived in, particularly the fish that were prevalent in the area, and the flow of sacred waters from the Maywundji into the salt water of Milniyawuy from the bottom-up. One of the panels illustrates the clan territories across land, waters and sea, which weaves these different aspects together. The fish shown cannot be identified taxonomically with confidence. However, based on their elongated forms and dorsal and anal fin characteristics, they may be mackerel (Scombridae), perhaps showing the pinnulae of mackerel fin rays. Spanish mackerel was the most important (40%) of the total catch among the 75 species taken during studies at Yorke Island in the Torres Strait from 1984 to 1986.

His dedication in ceremonial commitments required him to travel further distances from his homeland which meant producing less art than his peers; his work is still very respectable with technique and sacredness, seen on his memory poles, or ḻarrakitj. These are painted hollow-log branches used for honouring the dead, historically with bones contained inside.

Maymuru used sacred miny’tji designs and natural pigments to cover the ḻarrakitj that include secret messages–of clan symbols, moiety affiliation, and geography – primarily readable to initiated Yolŋu. His three-dimensional sculptures reflect the creation stories of Djarrakpi, the homeland, and are recognized to share qualities and themes similar to his father and uncle who also created ancestral imagery on bark. The Seattle Art Museum contains ceremonial sculptures by Baluka—four larrakitj from 2001 that are painted with natural earth pigments. This has ancestral ties to Djarrakpi, the name of the piece. Through the designs, Maymuru reflects sacred knowledge of the clan.

== Notable exhibitions ==
- Aratjara, Art of the First Australians, Kunstsammlung Nordrhein-Westfalen, Dusseldorf, 24 April-4 July 1993 (and touring).
- Miny'tji – Paintings from the East, National Gallery of Victoria, Melbourne, 1995.
- Native Title, Museum of Contemporary Art, Sydney, 1997.
- Saltwater Country – Bark Paintings from Yirrkala, Drill Hall Gallery, Canberra, ACT, John Curtin Gallery, Curtin Uni, Perth, WA; Australian National Maritime Museum, Darling Harbour, Sydney, NSW; Museum of Modern Art at Heide, Melbourne, VIC; Araluen Art Centre, Alice Springs, NT; Queensland University of Technology Art Museum, Brisbane, Qld; 1999-2001.
- Maḏayin: Eight Decades of Aboriginal Australian Bark Painting from Yirrkala. Hood Museum of Art, Dartmouth College, Hanover, New Hampshire, September 3–December 4, 2022; American University Museum, Washington, DC, January 28–May 21, 2023; The Fralin Museum of Art at the University of Virginia, Charlottesville, February 22–July 21, 2024; Asia Society Museum, New York, September 16, 2024 – January 5, 2025.
