= Moonah Arts Centre =

Arts centre in Hobart, Tasmania

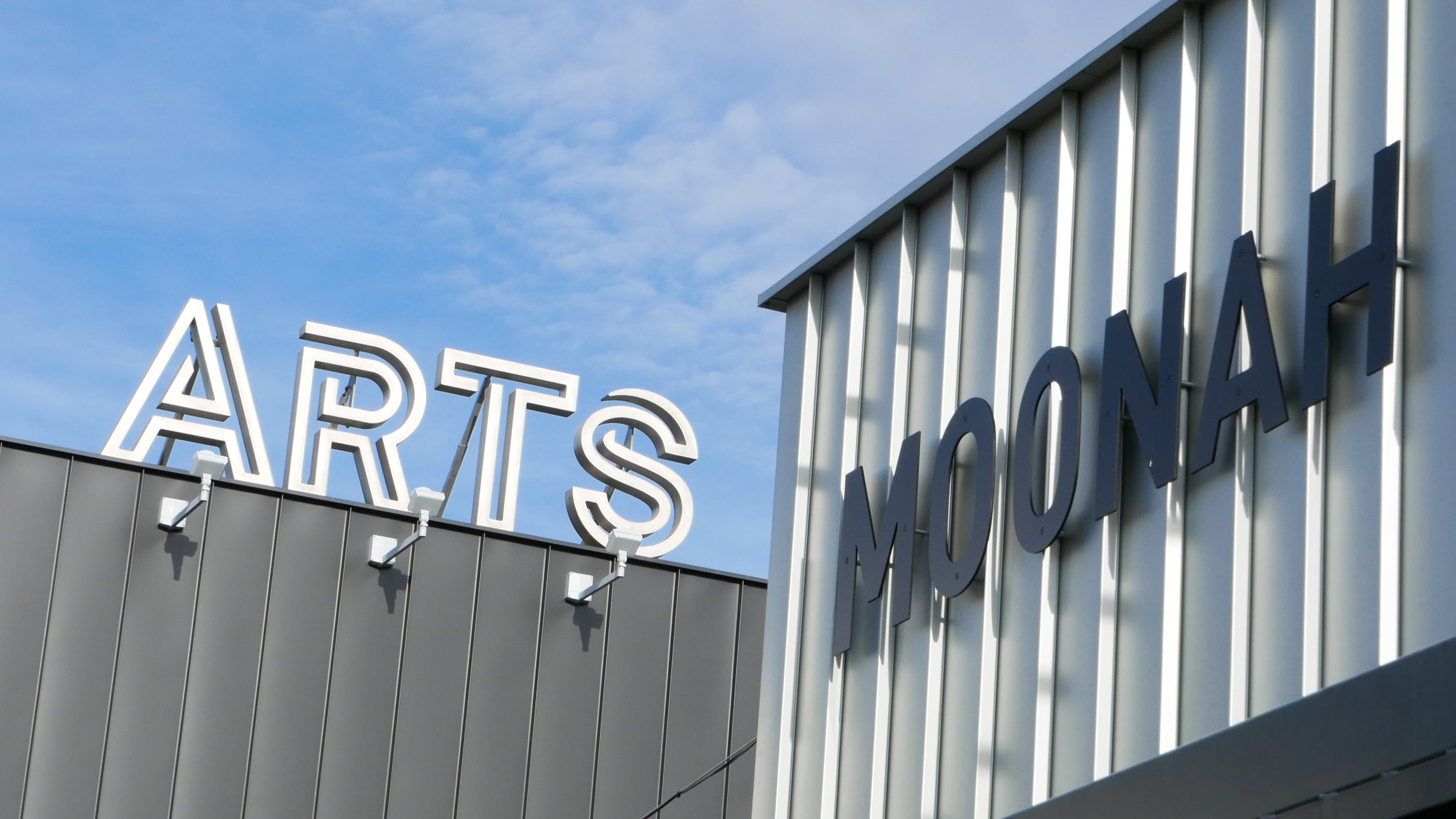
- Moonah Arts Centre signage, 2024
- Interactive map of Moonah Arts Centre
- Address: 23–27 Albert Road
- Location: Moonah, Tasmania, Australia
- Coordinates: 42°50′53.79″S 147°17′42.99″E
- Owner: Glenorchy City Council
- Operator: Glenorchy City Council
- Type: Multi-arts centre

Construction
- Built: 2013–2015
- Opened: 6 March 2015
- Cost: A$4 million
- Architects: Morrison & Breytenbach Architects

Website
- www.moonahartscentre.org.au

Moonah Arts Centre (MAC) is a publicly funded multi-arts hub in Moonah, Tasmania, a northern suburb of Hobart. Since opening on 6 March 2015 at a cost of AU$4 million, the centre stages exhibitions, live music, theatre, workshops and community festivals year-round. MAC is owned and operated by the Glenorchy City Council.

== History ==
Moonah Arts Centre began in 1994 in the former Moonah Community Hall at 65 Hopkins Street, becoming a focal point for community arts in Hobart’s northern suburbs. Growing patronage prompted Glenorchy City Council to pursue a larger venue; Commonwealth and state grants, secured in part through federal MP Andrew Wilkie helped fund the new facility on Albert Road from 2013. The centre opened to the public on 6 March 2015 with performances and a group exhibition that ABC News described as “the perfect complement" to the nearby Museum of Old and New Art.

=== Building ===
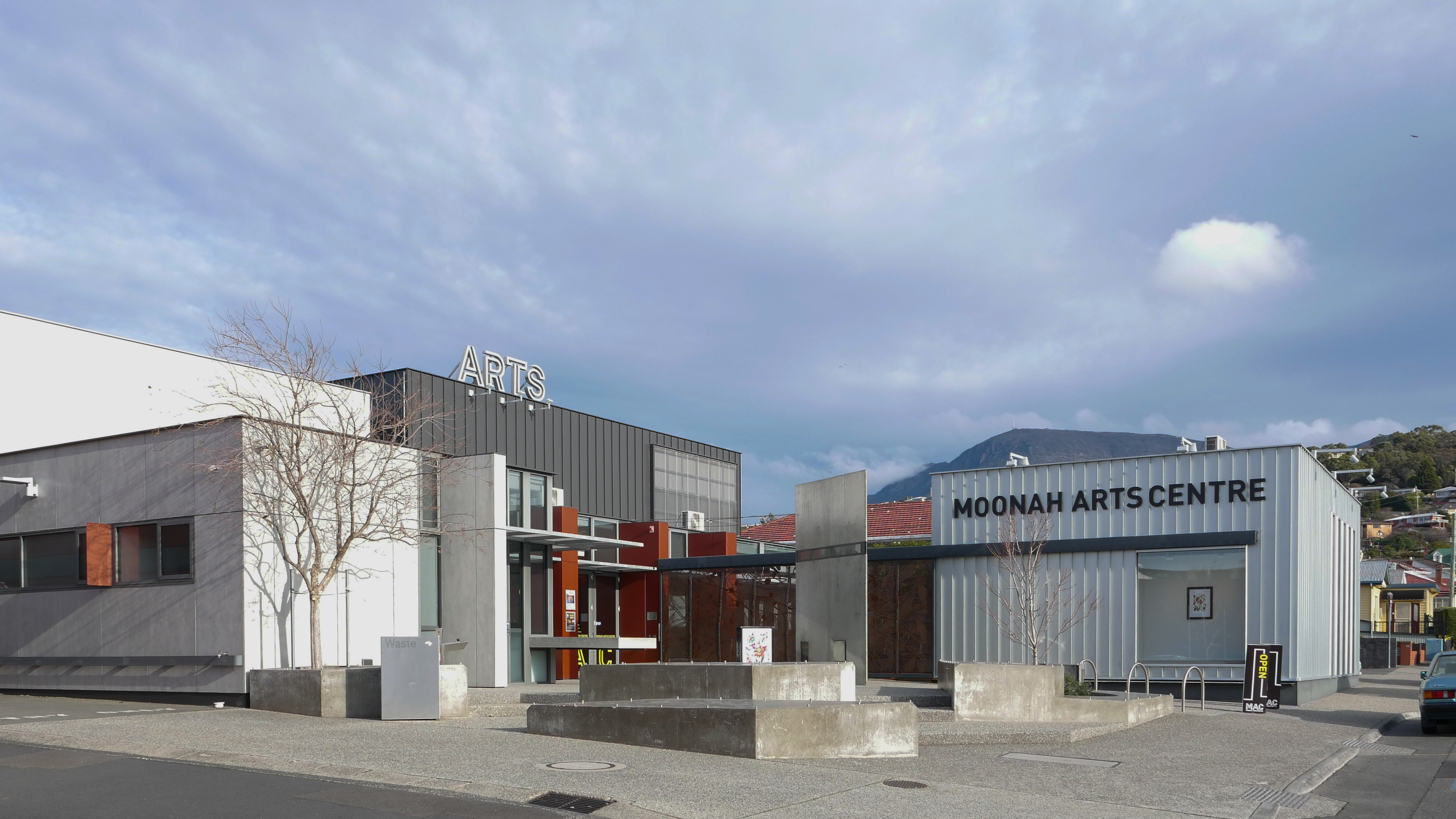
Moonah Arts Centre, c. 2024

Designed by Morrison & Breytenbach Architects, the building received the Alan C Walker Award for Public Architecture, and the Colorbond Award for Steel Architecture, at the 2015 Tasmanian Architecture Awards.

The two-storey complex articulates four principal volumes: the “light box”, “sound box”, “treasure box” and an open courtyard in contrasting cladding and form. Galleries can combine for large shows or divide for smaller installations, while a black-box studio hosts music, theatre and film. Inclusive design features include ramped access, hearing loops and all-gender amenities; sustainable measures range from passive solar orientation to recyclable aluminium façades.

Outside the entrance stands Frida’s Carload, a mosaic-tiled sculpture by Tasmanian artist Tony Woodward that has become a local landmark.

== Programme ==
=== Ongoing series ===
- Friday Nights Live, a continuing concert series featuring Tasmanian musicians.
- Glenorchy Open Art Exhibition, an annual community survey show established in 2018.
- Moonah Music, free family-friendly live-music afternoons held monthly.

=== Selected exhibitions (chronological) ===
- 2021 – Interplay, a craft and design showcase of local makers.
- 2022 – The Soup Collective, Church of Harridans Witnessers, exploring queer ageing and religious discrimination.
- 2023 – Treasured Lives, a group exhibition on hoarding and mental health produced with Anglicare Tasmania.
- 2024 – Dance of Colour, an international exhibition by Ukrainian folk artist Anna Mykhalchuk.

=== Festival partnerships (chronological) ===
- 2016 – Dark Mofo: jazz pianist Tom Vincent’s octet work Dhāraṇī, performed 14–15 June.
- 2024 – Ten Days on the Island: SA/MOA, another Pasifika collaboration.
- 2024 – Mona Foma:
  - The Shruti Sessions residency, featuring Debashish Bhattacharya and TextaQueen’s Bollywouldn’t mural (18–25 February).
  - Tabla player Jay Dabgar and santoor player Vinay Desai in concert (30 March).
- 2025 – Ten Days on the Island: Pasifika–First Nations project LUMI.

== Governance and funding ==
Moonah Arts Centre is owned and funded by Glenorchy City Council. Capital costs for the 2015 building totalled A$4 million, comprising council funds, a federal contribution of A$2.5 million and a state grant of A$1 million.

== See also ==
- Museum of Old and New Art
- Glenorchy Art and Sculpture Park
- List of art museums and galleries in Australia
