= Paddy Japaljarri Stewart =

Australian artist (1940–2013)

- Born: 30 June 1935; Mungapunju, south of Yuendumu, Tanami Desert, Australia
- Died: 30 November 2013 (aged 78)
- Style: Acrylic paint on canvas and linen
- Movement: Contemporary Indigenous Australian art

Paddy Japaljarri Stewart (30 June 1935 – 30 November 2013) was an Aboriginal Australian artist from Mungapunju, south of Yuendumu. He was chairman of the Warlukurlangu Artists Committee. Stewart was one of the artists who contributed to the Honey Ant Dreaming mural on the Papunya school wall in 1971, said to be the genesis of the modern Aboriginal art movement.

The people of Yuendumu in the early 1980s began transferring their traditional ochre ground paintings to canvas, and then to the doors. In 1983, Stewart along with four other artists painted 30 of the Yuendumu school doors with Dreaming designs, creating what became known as the Yuendumu Doors. The painted doors were also intended to remind the Yuendumu schoolchildren of a web of sites and obligations extending across their country. The entire series of Yuendumu Doors was acquired and restored by the South Australian Museum after the school was upgraded in 1995. Twelve of the best doors were selected for a travelling exhibition that toured Australia for three years; the Yuendumu Doors are now at the South Australian Museum.

In 1985 the Warlukurlangu Artists Association was established in Yuendumu, and the cooperative held its first major exhibition that year.

In May 1989, Stewart travelled to Paris to create a painting at the Centre Georges Pompidou.

In 2004 Stuart Macintyre wrote in a A concise history of Australia that Stewart recorded his testimony in his own language in 1991. "He evokes the continuity of dreaming from Grandfather and father to son and grandson, down the generations and across the passages of time; yet the insistence on the obligation to preserve and transmit his three jukurrpass attest to the corrosive possibility of secular change. He goes on to aver that the maintenance of Dreaming has to be really strict', so that his family will not lose it like paper, or throw it away or give it away to other families.

"My father's grandfather taught me first, and after a while my father taught me the same way as his father told jukurrpa [Dreaming], and then my father is telling the same story about what his father told him and now he is teaching me to live the same kind of jukurrpa and follow the way what my grandfather did, and then teach what my father did, and then I'm going to teach my grandchildren the same way as my father taught me. When my father was alive this is what he taught me. He taught me the traditional ways like the traditional designs in body or head of kangaroo Dreaming (that's what we call marlu Dreaming) and eagle Dreaming. He taught me to sing song for the big ceremonies. People who are related to us in a close family, they have to have the same sort of jukurrpa Dreaming, and to sing songs in the same way that we do our actions like dancing, and painting on our bodies or shields or things, and this is what my father taught me. My dreaming is the kangaroo dreaming, the Eagle Dreaming and the budgerigar Dreaming, so I have three kinds of Dreaming in my jukurrpa and I have to hang onto it. This is what my father taught me, and this is what I have to teach my sons the same way my father taught me, and thats way it will go on from grandparent to sons, and follow that jukurrpa. No-one knows when it will end."

Hanging on to tradition was key in his life. Early in his life he worked as a chef in Papunya, and since retained his nickname "Cookie". Japaljarri's work is one of the most plagued by fake copies, and was centre to one of the first art forgery cases to be heard in Australia. He is also one of the first Aboriginal artists to achieve a high international profile in the late 1980s. Stewart taught the children Jukurrpa (dreaming) art. It taught young artists that painting can be your own free expression.

In 1995, the Canberra Medical Society, specifically doctors Martin Duncan and Cam Webber, went to the remote Yuendumu settlement where they removed cataracts from five Aboriginal artists, including Stewart who had one of the most difficult conditions.

In 2001 Stewart and Paddy Japaljarri Sims, won the $4,000 Telstra Work on Paper Award from the National Aboriginal Art Award (now Telstra National Aboriginal and Torres Strait Islander Art Award).

Stewart died on 30 November 2013.
