= List of art museums and galleries in Australia =

This is an incomplete list of art museums and galleries in Australia:

Gallery	Est.	End	City	State	Ref.
Ararat Gallery TAMA (Textile Art Museum Australia)	1968		Ararat	Vic	
Art Gallery of New South Wales (AGNSW)	1880		Sydney	NSW	
Art Gallery of South Australia (AGSA)	1881		Adelaide	SA	
Art Gallery of Western Australia (AGWA)	1895		Perth	WA	
Artbank	1980		Sydney	NSW	
Australian Centre for Contemporary Art	2002		Melbourne	Vic	
Ballarat Fine Art Gallery	1884		Ballarat	Vic	
Benalla Art Gallery	1975		Benalla	Vic	
Bendigo Art Gallery	1887		Bendigo	Vic	
Bluethumb Art Gallery	2011		Adelaide	SA	
Brummels Gallery	1956	1980	Melbourne	Vic	
Bunbury Regional Art Gallery	1987		Bunbury	WA	
Canberra Museum and Gallery	1998		Canberra	ACT	
Carrick Hill	1983		Adelaide	SA	
Castlemaine Art Museum	1913		Castlemaine	Vic	
Central Goldfields Art Gallery	1996		Maryborough	Vic	
Centre for Contemporary Photography (CCP)	1986		Melbourne	Vic	
Convent Gallery	1988		Daylesford	Vic	
Drill Hall Gallery (Australian National University)	1998		Canberra	ACT	
East Gippsland Art Gallery	1992		Bairnsdale	Vic	
Firstdraft	1986		Sydney	NSW	
Flinders University Museum of Art (FUMA)	1978		Adelaide	SA	
Gallery A	1959	1970	Melbourne	Vic	
Gallery A	1964	1983	Sydney	NSW	
Gallery A	1964	1970	Canberra	ACT	
Geelong Art Gallery	1895		Geelong	Vic	
Gertrude Contemporary Art Spaces	1985		Melbourne	Vic	
Gippsland Art Gallery	1965		Sale	Vic	
Gold Coast City Art Gallery	1986		Gold Coast	Qld	
Griffith University Art Museum	1974		Brisbane	Qld	
Hamilton Gallery	1961		Hamilton	Vic	
Heide Museum of Modern Art	1981		Melbourne	Vic	
Horsham Regional Art Gallery	1983		Horsham	Vic	
Hyphen – Wodonga Library Gallery			Wodonga	Vic	
Ian Potter Museum of Art, University of Melbourne	1998		Melbourne	Vic	
La Trobe Art Institute	2013		Bendigo	Vic	
Latrobe Regional Gallery	1971		Morwell	Vic	
Mildura Arts Centre	1956		Mildura	Vic	
Moonah Arts Centre	2015		Hobart	TAS	
Museum and Art Gallery of the Northern Territory	1970		Darwin	NT	
Museum of Contemporary Art Australia	1991		Sydney	NSW	
Museum of Contemporary Art, Brisbane	1987	1994	Brisbane	Qld	
Museum of Modern Art Australia (MoMAA)	1958	1966	Melbourne	Vic	
Museum of Old and New Art	2011		Hobart	Tas	
National Art Glass Gallery	1979		Wagga Wagga	NSW	
National Gallery of Australia	1967		Canberra	ACT	
National Gallery of Victoria (NGV)	1861		Melbourne	Vic	
National Portrait Gallery (Australia)	1998		Canberra	ACT	
Newcastle Art Gallery	1957		Newcastle	NSW	
New England Regional Art Museum (NERAM)	1983		Armidale	NSW	
Norman Lindsay Gallery and Museum	1970		Faulconbridge	NSW	
Perth Institute of Contemporary Arts (PICA)	1988		Perth	WA	
Peter Bray Gallery	1951	1957	Melbourne	Vic	
Post Office Gallery (University of Ballarat)	2002		Ballarat	Vic	
Queen Victoria Museum and Art Gallery	1891		Launceston	Tas	
Queensland Art Gallery	1895		Brisbane	Qld	
Queensland Gallery of Modern Art	2006		Brisbane	Qld	
QUT Art Museum (Queensland University of Technology)			Brisbane	Qld	
Rockhampton Museum of Art	2022		Rockhampton	Qld	
Samstag Museum (Anne & Gordon Samstag Museum of Art)	1977		Adelaide	SA	
Sedon Galleries	1925	1959	Melbourne	Vic	
S. H. Ervin Gallery	1978		Sydney	NSW	
Stanley Coe Gallery	1949		Melbourne	Vic	
Storey Hall (RMIT University)	1996		Melbourne	Vic	
Swan Hill Regional Art Gallery	1966		Swan Hill	Vic	
Shepparton Art Museum (SAM)	1936		Shepparton	Vic	
Tandanya National Aboriginal Cultural Institute	1989		Adelaide	SA	
TarraWarra Museum of Art	2000		Healesville	Vic	
Tasmanian Museum and Art Gallery	1843		Hobart	Tas	
Tye's Gallery	1940	1955	Melbourne	Vic	
UQ Art Museum (University of Queensland)			Brisbane	Qld	
USC Art Gallery (University of the Sunshine Coast)			Sippy Downs	Qld	
Velasquez Gallery	1940	1955	Melbourne	Vic	
Wangaratta Art Gallery	1987		Wangaratta	Vic	
Warrnambool Art Gallery	1886		Warrnambool	Vic	
Wollongong Art Gallery	1978		Wollongong	NSW	

== See also ==
- List of museums in Australia
