= Ishmael Marika =

Yolngu musician and filmmaker

- Born: 1991 (age 34–35); Nhulunbuy, Eastern Arnhem Land, Australia
- Occupations: Musician, Filmmaker
- Parents: Gary Waninya (also written "Wanyubi") Marika (father); Yalmakany Marawili (mother)

Ishmael Marika (born 1991) is a Yolngu (also written Yolŋu) musician, filmmaker, director and producer. His installations have been exhibited in many of Australia's most important museums, including the Museum of Contemporary Art in Sydney and the Art Gallery of South Australia in Adelaide. He is currently the Creative Director for the pre-eminent Indigenous media unit in Australia, the Mulka Project, based at Buku-Larrnggay Mulka Art Centre at Yirrkala in Northeast Arnhem Land. The Mulka Project seeks to preserve and disseminate the sacred languages and cultural practices of the Yolngu people by collecting and archiving photographs, audio and video. It has also received global recognition from academics and museums as a leading example of Indigenous-led digital archiving. Under Marika’s direction, the Mulka Project has developed a vast digital archive housing ceremonial footage, oral histories, and language recordings. The project also exemplifies what scholars call the “Indigenous hybrid economy,” blending cultural production, local employment, and digital innovation to support sustainable livelihoods in remote communities.

== Life ==
Ishmael was born in Nhulunbuy, Australia, to mother Yalmakany Marawili, and father Gary Waninya (also written Wanyubi) Marika. His mother is a Yirralka Ranger and exhibited artist, and sister to Djambawa Marawili. His father is a prominent artist who has an Order of Australia for services to Indigenous Health. His mother's side of the family belongs to the Madarrpa clan and his father's side belongs to the Rirratjingu clan. His maternal grandmother is Dhudu Djapu. His paternal grandfather's side is Dhalwangu. Ishmael's father is also an elder of the Rirratjingu clan and his grandfather, Milirrpum, represented his people as the lead plaintiff in the first Land Rights case —Milirrpum v Nabalco Pty Ltd, also known as the Gove Land Rights Case, in 1971. Marika’s paternal and maternal lineage places him within a long-standing Yolngu tradition of ceremonial authority, land custodianship, and legal activism.

Marika spent his youth in Yilpara, a school in the East Arnhem Region, Australia. He attended Nhulubuy Primary School before moving to Melbourne, Australia to complete years 8 and 9. He then attended a school in Darwin, the capital of Australia's Northern Territory, finishing years 10 to 12. In 2016, Marika was named Telstra Youth of the Year for his contributions to Indigenous music and filmmaking. In 2009, he returned to Yirrkala in the East Arnhem Shire in the Northern Arnhem Territory of Australia. Here he spent 6 months working as ranger before beginning his work with the Mulka Project in 2010, where he currently is Creative Director. In recognition of his cultural and artistic achievements, Marika was awarded the Telstra Youth of the Year award in 2016.

== Career ==
Ishmael Marika grew up with traditional music and began singing at the age of 10. He has continued to write songs that tell the traditional stories of his people about the creation of the world, the relationship between man and his natural environment, behaviours and etiquette of his people, and more. In 2015, Marika was one of several Indigenous artist fellows invited to the British Museum to respond to historical collections and share perspectives on repatriation and cultural authority. During this London exhibition, Marika’s contributed to new reflections on the museum’s legacy as a colonial institution and the role of Yolngu artists in cultural diplomacy.

In 2016, Marika earned critical acclaim for his song “Two Sisters Journey.” The song won the NT Traditional Song of the Year award in 2016. In addition to songwriting, Ishmael has worked on numerous cultural productions for the Yolngu people, with the permission of the elders, including documentations of various ceremonial traditions such as the dhapi and baparru ceremonies. In 2017, Marika collaborated with Martu artist Curtis Taylor for the exhibition In Cahoots at the Fremantle Arts Centre, producing a spear installation that symbolized both horror storytelling and cross-cultural knowledge exchange. The artists crafted over 70 spears together using traditional techniques, with the work displayed as a dramatic suspended array exploring Indigenous collaboration and shared storytelling forms. His first and most widely-known documentary, is titled Wanga Watangumirri Dharuk (2010), about Yolngu land rights—a subject with familial importance to him. This documentary has appeared at several music festivals, and was privately screened for East Timor former President José Ramos-Horta. The film was also included in the Darwin Festival and received strong audience engagement for its treatment of Indigenous sovereignty.

Marika’s filmmaking aligns with Indigenous scholar Marcia Langton’s argument that Aboriginal film functions as political self-representation and cultural reclamation. In 2013, Marika created a work titled My Grandfather Passing on a Message, which features a tape recording of his grandfather and English subtitles. The goal of this display was not only to catalogue important Yolngu knowledge for future generations, but also to share culture with outsiders. This work is considered a pivotal example of Marika’s effort to translate oral knowledge into audiovisual form while maintaining cultural sensitivity.

In 2014, he released a second film, Galka, a drama film about Yolŋu sorcery. Galka appeared at the Garma Festival of Traditional Cultures in 2014, where it received a standing ovation. In 2016, Marika co-authored an article in Artlink magazine discussing the Mulka Project’s role in documenting and digitizing sacred Yolngu knowledge while respecting cultural protocols. Since this, Marika has produced a number of other films including Gapu Ga Gunda: The Art of Nongirrngga Marawili (2015), and a 5 episode installment titled Wunya’Gali (The Other Side) in 2017, commissioned by Transport for NSW.

In 2022, Marika’s work Gapu Muŋurru ga Baḻamumu Mirikindi (Deep Waters of the Dhuwa and Yirritja Moieties) opened the Madayin exhibition at the Hood Museum of Art in New Hampshire. This 11-minute video work featured Yolngu elders singing ancestral songlines over ocean imagery and served as a ceremonial welcome to the gallery, visually linking the sacred bark paintings with Yolngu kinship principles. The Madayin project was initiated by Yolngu leaders and curated according to Yolngu principles of gurrutu (kinship), with curators such as Wukun Wanambi arranging bark paintings based on clan relationships rather than chronology. Marika contributed video works and was part of the broader Yolngu curatorial team.

Marika’s video installations, including Gapu Muŋurru ga Baḻamumu Mirikindi, were used throughout Madayin to “reunite” the paintings with ancestral spirits, an act of cultural revitalization and ceremonial presence. As Wukun Wanambi explains, the Madayin exhibition only reveals ‘the surface’ (garrwar) of Yolngu knowledge, preserving sacred meanings that remain restricted even as the exhibition invites global audiences into Yolngu ways of seeing. Working within the Mulka Project's goal to facilitate culture in Arnhem Land, Marika collaborated with Martu artist Curtis Taylor, learning how to make spears from clan elders in order to create a work of art that crosses language groups. This project, titled Scars, reflects on intergenerational knowledge transfer and the visible and invisible marks of cultural continuity.

Through this and similar projects, Marika facilitates cultural transmission across generations, making sacred knowledge accessible to younger Yolngu audiences while preserving its authority. In all, 70 spears were crafted and displayed at Fremantle Arts Centre from November 2017 until January 2018. He has also created other large-screen film projects, including a piece in 2017 that is displayed at Wynyard Station in Sydney. Also in 2017, for the Tarnanthi Festival—a yearly Aboriginal art showcase—Marika developed a moving-image to accompany a work by artist Nawurapu Wunungmurra. Marika’s display depicted traditional Yolngu dance that is performed to greet fishermen arriving in northeast Arnhem Land. He has also led workshops and mentorship programs through the Mulka Project, training younger Yolngu in filmmaking and digital storytelling to continue cultural preservation efforts. In a curatorial statement quoted during the 2019 Tarnanthi Festival, Marika reflected on the Yolngu philosophy of gurrutu, saying: ‘For outsiders, I want them to see and understand the connections the people here have… We’re linked. Everybody is linked.'

Starting in 2022, Marika began traveling to the United States as part of the Yolngu curatorial staff for the Madayin exhibition, which features 8 decades of bark paintings, as well as two video installations created by Marika and the Mulka Project. This exhibition reflects Marika’s commitment to preserving Yolngu law and knowledge using both bark painting and cutting-edge digital media. Marika reflects on MADAYIN: Eight Decades of Aboriginal Australian Bark Painting from Yirrkala. Starting in 2022, Marika traveled to the United States both as a participating artist and curatorial advisor for the Madayin exhibition, reflecting the dual roles Indigenous artists often assume in cultural preservation. Marika reflects upon the opening of MAḎAYIN at the Hood Museum of Art. In 2023, Marika's work Djarraṯawun was featured at the Enlighten Festival in Canberra, where Yolngu songlines and natural forces were projected onto the National Gallery of Australia’s façade.

== Awards and nominations ==
Telstra Youth of the Year at the National Aboriginal & Torres Strait Islander Awards (NATSIA) for Sunlight Energy in 2016.

NT Traditional Song of the Year at the National Indigenous Music Awards (NIMA) with a recording of "Two Sisters Journey."

NT Young Achiever of the Year Award in 2015 Marika’s creative works frequently address themes of ancestral law, environmental change, and cross-cultural communication, blending traditional Yolngu perspectives with contemporary artistic methods. His work is part of a broader cultural movement where Indigenous artists assert sovereignty and continuity through both traditional and contemporary forms of expression.
