= Jody Broun =

Indigenous Australian artist and activist

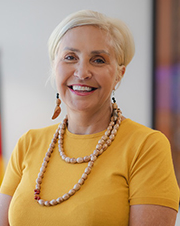
- Born: Jody Broun; 1963 (age 62–63); Perth, Western Australia
- Occupations: Public servant and activist
- Awards: Telstra National Aboriginal and Torres Strait Islander Art Award (1998); Canberra Art Prize (2005)

Jody Broun (born 1963) is an Indigenous Australian artist and activist with a long-standing career, most recently with her current position being Chief Executive Officer of the National Indigenous Australians Agency. She has completed a Diploma of Teaching, Bachelor of Education and a Masters in Philosophy. In 1998 she was awarded first prize in the Telstra National Aboriginal and Torres Strait Islander Art Award for her artwork "White Fellas Come To Talk Bout Land" and in 2005 Broun was awarded first place in the Canberra Art Prize for her artwork "Half-Time Game". Along with these major awards Broun has displayed many artworks in solo and group exhibitions, winning many other awards, and grants. Broun is a Yindjibarndi woman with family connection from the Pilbara region in North Western Australia, and is known for her dedication to Indigenous communities in Australia.

== Personal life ==
Jody Broun was born in Perth, Western Australia in 1963 and has since then moved around Australia for various positions relating to her career. Broun is a Yindjibarndi woman with family connection from the Pilbara region in North Western Australia. She has one sister, Michelle Broun, who is a sculpture artist.

Jody Broun's mother was part of the Stolen Generation and as a child was taken from her family and forced to live on a mission. Her mother was unable to meet her family again until she was an adult. Due to this, when Jody Broun was a child she had strong ties to her traditional country and family. Broun's love for country was instilled from a young age where she learnt the stories of her people and visited her traditional Pilbara land regularly. She established a closeness with both her relatives and her native land. The closeness between Broun, the people and the traditional land has had a large influence on her artworks, with may of her paintings reflecting the Pilbara scenery. This influence is demonstrated in her artworks through the use of rich colours, shapes and vast landscapes.

Broun was raised in Perth, Western Australia and continued living there until she moved to Sydney in 2003. During this time Broun lived in both Perth Western Australia and Sydney New South Wales, she pursued a career with a focus on the rights and welfare of Indigenous Australians. This is portrayed through her work as a high school teacher at Clontarf Aboriginal College, being a contemporary Indigenous artist, Executive Director of Aboriginal Housing and Infrastructure (Western Australia), Director General of NSW Department of Aboriginal Affairs NSW and most recently the Chief Executive of Aboriginal Housing Office New South Wales.

== Career ==
Jody Broun has spent the last 30 years of her career with a focus on Aboriginal affairs at both state and national levels. In the first part of her career, Broun worked in Western Australia, and more recently, she has worked in New South Wales. Broun's main aspect and commitment of her career is to the education of Aboriginal people. Along with this Broun has spent the previous 8 years in leadership roles at the New South Wales Department of Aboriginal Affairs. Most recently Broun has become the new Chief Executive of the Aboriginal Housing Office, where she currently (2019) works. This role involves ensuring that Aboriginal and Torres Strait Islander people have access to quality and affordable housing.

Jody Broun completed her Diploma of Teaching (1984) at Nedlands Teachers College and Bachelor of Education (1987) at Edith Cowan University. In 1987 Broun had her first artwork displayed in a Group Exhibition for Contemporary Aboriginal Artists Exhibition, in Burrukmarri Gallery, Fermantle, Western Australia. Broun spent most of the next decade teaching at Clontarf Aboriginal College in Perth. During this time Broun was also completing her Masters in Philosophy, Aboriginal literature (1992) through the University of Western Australia. In 1993 Broun had her first solo exhibition displayed in BaraguGnara, in the Hills country. After leaving Clontarf Aboriginal College 1993, Broun worked as the Executive Director of Aboriginal Housing and Infrastructure for the Department of Housing and Works Western Australia for 9 years. This role involved implementing housing and infrastructural programs statewide. It also involved influencing the mainstream policy and servicing of the Aboriginal Housing Board. During this time, Jody Broun won the Telstra Aboriginal and Torres Strait Islander Arts Award (1998).

In 2003 Broun left the Department of Housing and Works, and moved from Perth to Sydney to work as the director general for the NSW Department of Aboriginal Affairs for the next 7 years. In this role Broun acted as a principal advisor, leading and managing the Aboriginal Affairs department. Along with this, she led policies on Aboriginal programs for combating child sexual assault, community development and empowerment, employment and housing. Whilst working as the director general, Broun won the Canberra Art Prize (2005).

In 2011 Jody Broun joined the National Congress of Australia's First Peoples and was elected as Co-Chairperson for the next 2 years and 2 months. During this time Broun advocated for national policy with a focus on health policies. Alongside this, Broun was involved with the Constitutional Recognition of Aboriginal and Torres Strait Islander people. After working as the Co-Chairperson, Broun took 9 months off to be self employed. In May 2014 she was appointed as the Director of NSW/ACT Australian Red Cross, where she remained for the next 4 years and 7 months. This role involved the management of over 300 employees and 6000 volunteers. Alongside this Broun assisted with the delivering of services and programs to disadvantaged people. Finally in November 2018, Jody Broun started work at the Aboriginal Housing Office as the Chief Executive, where she still currently works (as of 2019). The Aboriginal Housing Office has been put in place to provide affordable housing to Aboriginal and Torres Strait Islander people.

During her career, Broun has received grants, awards, and commissions for a variety of works including solo and group exhibitions at a variety of collections. This includes solo exhibitions from 1993 to 2007, and group exhibitions from 1987 to 2008.

Between the years of 1996 and 2010, Broun completed multiple publications and broadcasts on a variety of platforms, including books and magazines. These publications were on variety of topics including Aboriginal affairs and her artworks.

== Activism ==
Jody Broun has been a longstanding advocate for Indigenous rights and has made multiple public statements and appearances on various occasions advocating for Aboriginal and Torres Strait Islander people, on a number of issues.

In an interview most recently (September 2018) with Senior Rights Service, Jody Broun advocated for Aboriginal and Torres Strait Islander people through speaking on the ongoing racism and the barriers that they face when accessing services and service providers. Through the barriers of racism, Broun argues Indigenous people are left vulnerable as these barriers limit their ability to access services including, government institutions and emergency services. As of 2013, Broun was a co-chairman of the Close The Gap Coalition, regarding life expectancy of Aboriginal and Torres Strait Islanders, and putting an end to the Northern Territory intervention. In 2013, Jody Broun also attended a rally in Victoria Park on 26 January in protest against Australia Day. Broun spoke to the crowd, acknowledging the history and survival of Indigenous culture, along with ongoing social justice movements of Indigenous Australians.

In 2011 Broun wrote a July/August issue in the Indigenous Law Bulletin titled "Shaping Change: The National Congress of Australia's First Peoples Explores The Path Towards Constitutional Reform". This five page article was written during the time when Jody Broun was a Co-Chair of the National Congress of Australia's First Peoples. This article outlined the need for constitutional recognition of Aboriginal and Torres Strait Islander peoples in terms of reform and the inclusion of Indigenous perspectives in constitution.

== Artistic style ==
Jody Broun is a contemporary Indigenous artist with a distinct artistic style. This involves drawing on influencers of country and the history of Indigenous Australians in colonial Australia. The artworks are focused on capturing the importance of community and what is important to the people. Colonialism is also reflected in her artworks, and is very prominent in 'White Fellas Come To Talk Bout Land'. These themes are depicted by the use of contrasting vibrant colours portraying the community of the Indigenous people that live in outback Australia. These colours represent the red earth of the outback and the strikingly clear blue sky, along with the unique fish eye lens perspective, as demonstrated in her "White Fellas Come To Talk Bout Land" award-winning artwork. Broun depicts the Western Desert styled painting using an aerial perspective also portrayed in her 1999 award-winning artwork. Broun's artworks are painted on large canvases with the use of acrylic paints. An example of this is portrayed in her 2000 artwork called "After the land meeting at Millstream" painted with acrylic paint on a 185 x 152 cm canvas depicting the Millstream in Western Australia of the Northwest region.

Other paintings that portray the artistic style of Jody Broun include:

- "Bringing Home the Killer" painted on Belgian linen (1220 mm x 910 mm) with acrylic paint
- "Sorry Business" painted on linen (1220 mm x 1220 mm) with acrylic paint
- "The Brough Line" painted on linen (1520 mm x 1220 mm) with acrylic paint
- "The Burden of Proof" painted on Belgian linen (1800 mm x 1600 mm) with acrylic paint
- "The Good Country" painted on linen (1200 mm x 1200 mm) with acrylic paint
- "The Protector" painted on linen (750 mm x 1000 mm) with acrylic paint
- "The Whiter Side of Life" painted on linen (1520 mm x 1220 mm) with acrylic paint
- "Waiting for the Emu" painted on linen (1000 mm x 1000 mm) with acrylic paint

== Major awards and placings ==
Jody Broun has won a variety of awards and has been nominated for many others between the years of 1993 and 2008. Broun has also been given grants and commissions for her artworks between the same years of 1993 and 2008. Her first main major award that has been awarded to Broun is the Telstra National Aboriginal and Torres Strait Islander Art Award presented to her in Darwin Northern Territory, 1998 for the artwork "White Fellas Come To Talk Bout Land". In 1999, 2000, 2001, 2003, and 2005 Broun was a finalist for the Telstra National Aboriginal and Torres Strait Islander Art Award awarded from Darwin Northern Territory.

In 2003, Jody Broun was a finalist for the Tattersalls Art Award from Brisbane, Queensland.

In 2005 Jody Broun won the Canberra Art Prize for her artwork "Half-Time Game". In the same year she also was a finalist for the Walkom Manning Art Prize from Taree New South Wales, the Heysen Prize for Australian Landscape from Hahndorf Academy South Australia, the Billigen Art Prize from Billigen New South Wales, and City Whyalla Art Prize from Whyalla, South Australia.

In 2006 Broun was a finalist for the Sunshine Coast Art Prize from Caloundra Queensland, the Heysen Prize for Australian Landscape from Hahndorf Academy South Australia, The Ergon Energy Central Queensland Art Award from Rockhampton Art Gallery Queensland, and the Stanthorpe Art Prize from Stanthrope Queensland.

Many of Broun's artworks have been used for Indigenous focused print. This includes and can be seen in Broun's artwork that was used in 1993 as Inaugural Equal Opportunities Calendar. Along with her 2002 artwork that was used as the Cover Design for the State Law Publisher (located in Perth, Western Australia), titled "Putting the Picture Together: The Gordon Inquiry into Response by Government Agencies to Complaints of Family Violence and Child Abuse in Aboriginal Communities". This theme is also prevalent and able to be seen in 2006 when Broun's artwork was used as the cover image for the Office of Indigenous Policy Coordination's calendar.

== Selected works ==
The most well-known artworks produced by Jody Broun include, "White Fellas Come To Talk Bout Land", which won the Telstra National Aboriginal and Torres Strait Islander Art Award in 1998.

Along with this award, Broun's artwork "Half-Time Game" won the Canberra Art Prize in 2005.
