= Lisa Gorman =

Australian fashion designer

- Occupation: Fashion designer
- Known for: Founder of Gorman
- Spouse: Dean Angelucci (m. 2007)
- Children: 2

Lisa Gorman is an Australian fashion designer. She established the women’s fashion label Gorman, developed the brand for 22 years, retiring as its creative director in 2021.

== Early life ==
Eldest of four daughters, Gorman grew up at the coastal town of Warrnambool in Victoria. After graduating in 1989 from St Ann's College, an all-girls school in Warrnambool, she moved to Melbourne and studied nursing. Gorman worked part-time at Royal Melbourne Hospital for eight years.

== Career ==
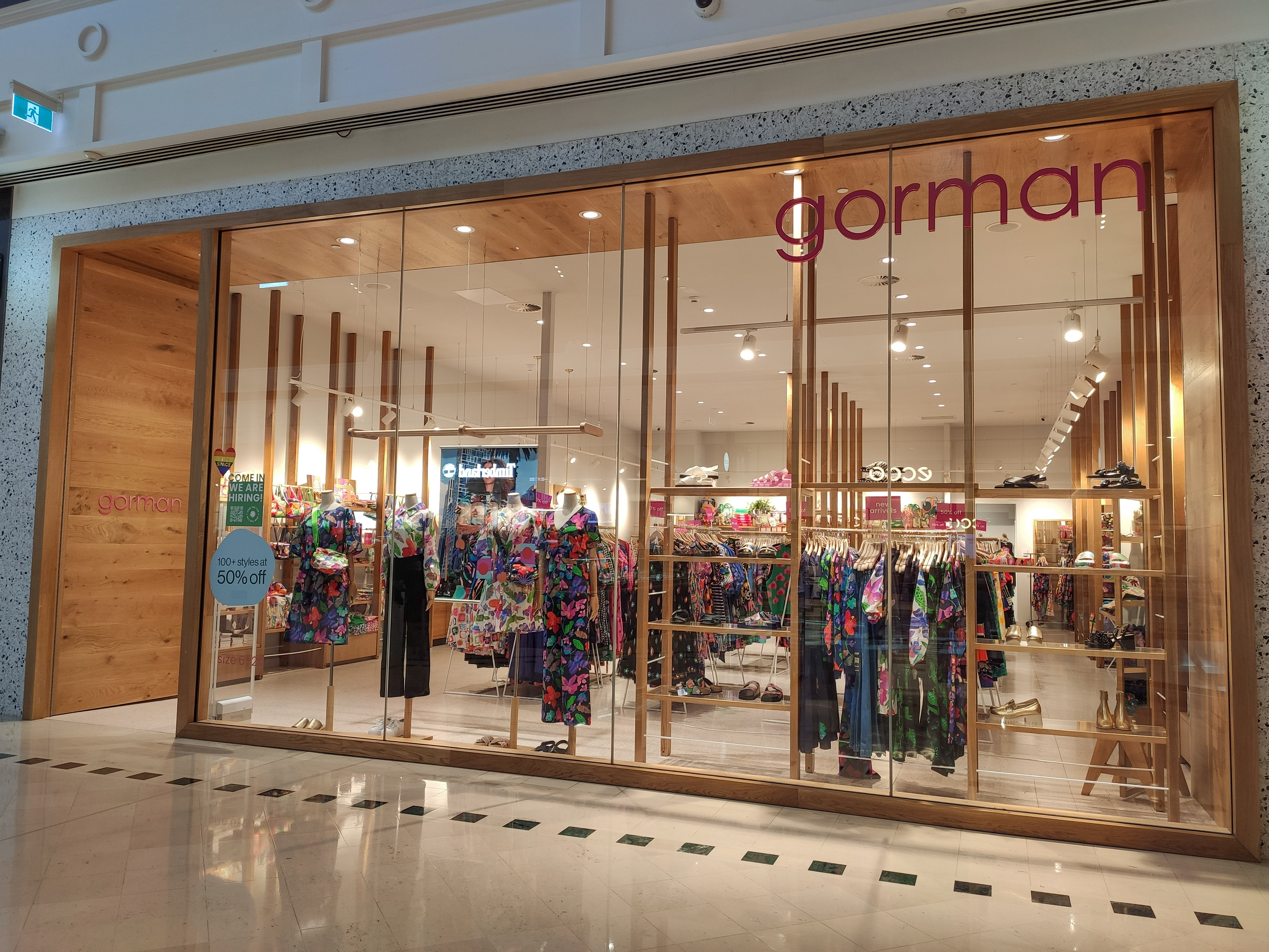
Gorman store in Karrinyup Shopping Centre

Gorman began her career in fashion as a designer for the Melbourne bridal couturier Mariana Hardwick. In 1999, she launched her label, Gorman, with a collection titled ‘Less Than 12 Degrees’ at the now-defunct fat 52 boutique. By 2003, the label was stocked in 55 retailers in Australia and 15 in Japan. In 2004, she opened the first Gorman boutique in Prahran, Melbourne.

In 2010, Gorman part-sold her brand to the fashion conglomerate Factory X, citing that she wanted to remain focused on the designing and have assistance running the growing business. By November 2021, Gorman had over 50 stores across Australia. By the mid-2010s, the label was considered one of the most "iconic" brands on the Australian fashion scene.

In November 2023, Gorman became the creative director for stationery brand Kikki.K.

== Personal life ==
Gorman lives in Fitzroy, Victoria with her husband Dean Angelucci and their two daughters.
