= Ngangkari =

Traditional healers of Anangu and Arrernte peoples of Australia

Ngangkari are the traditional healers of the Anangu, the Aboriginal peoples who live mostly in the Anangu Pitjantjatjara Yankunytjatjara (APY Lands) of South Australia and the Western Desert region, which includes parts of the Northern Territory and Western Australia. The word in the Arrernte languages of Central Australia is ngangkere. Ngangkari have been part of Aboriginal culture for thousands of years, and attend to the physical and psychic health of Anangu.

== Background ==
Ngangkari have nurtured the physical, emotional and social wellbeing of their people for thousands of years. The term applies to traditional healers of the Anangu, who live mostly in the APY Lands, which encompass about 103,000 square kilometres (40,000 mi^{2}) of South Australia, and are part of the Western Desert cultural bloc of Aboriginal peoples. The variant spelling, ngangkere, is used in translating the Arrernte languages.

Elders choose ngangkari at birth, and pass on their cultural knowledge. The powers ngangkari are given, called mapanpa, heal spiritual as well as physical ailments.

Before colonisation of South Australia the Anangu were fit, happy and healthy; living their traditional lifestyle of hunting, gathering and eating traditional foods. In these times the ngangkari were primarily needed for simple injuries such as burns and people who had been in the sun too long, but that role has changed significantly. Following colonisation, and the introduction of a number of epidemics, being moved off Country, and the introduction of drugs and alcohol (and associated issues), ngangkari are having to work harder than ever to help their people and adjust to these new demands.

== In film ==
The short documentary film Ngangkari was written and directed by Erica Glynn and shot by her son, Warwick Thornton. It was broadcast on television in 2002 as part of series 3 of Australia by Numbers, and was screened at the Berlin International Film Festival in 2013.

== Contemporary application ==
The ngangkari tradition continues to the present day, with ngangkari continuing to help people from their communities as well as in hospitals, nursing homes, gaols, hostels and a variety of health services. Ngangkari also work in partnership with the western health system in order to deliver the best health and wellbeing outcomes for their people.

Using ngangkari in partnership with western medicine has proven to be very successful and in some places, including the Royal Adelaide Hospital. Ngangkari healers are popular with clients from different backgrounds, assisting with pain management and relief and, especially for Aboriginal patients, improving attendance rates at medical appointments.

=== Word of the year shortlisting ===
The Pitjantjatjara word ngangkari, defined as an Indigenous practitioner of bush medicine, was short-listed for the Macquarie Dictionary 2019 word of the year.

== Notable ngangkari ==
Ngangkari include Pitjantjatjara artists Bill Whiskey Tjapaltjarri and Betty Muffler of Iwantja Arts, whose work was featured in the 2020 Tarnanthi exhibition as well as on the cover of the September 2020 issue of Vogue Australia. Muffler has a reputation of being one of the best ngangkari in the APY lands, and her healing powers have been in demand to help with anxiety caused by the COVID-19 pandemic in Australia (2020–2021).
