= Wukun Wanambi =

Yirrkala Aboriginal artist (1962–2022)

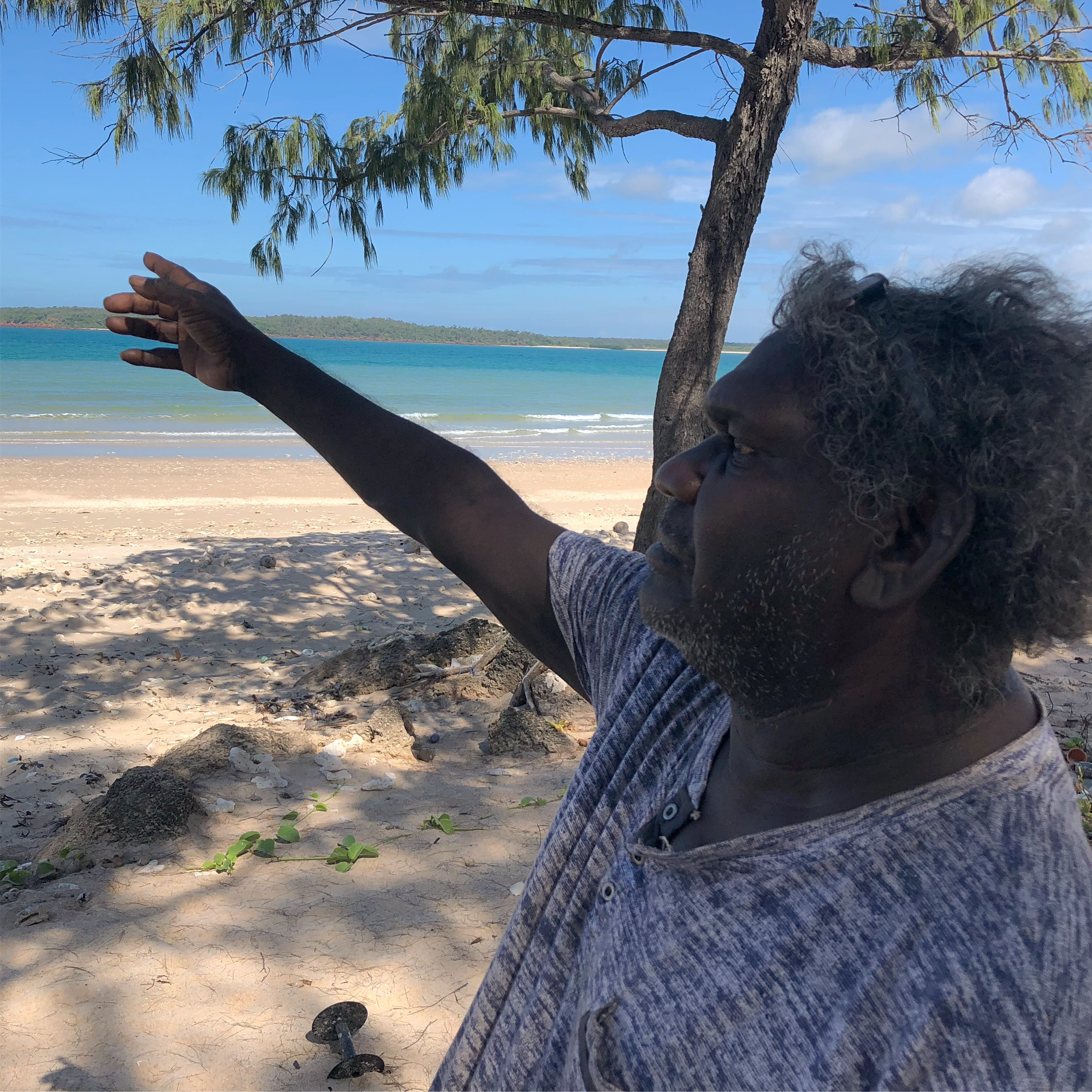
- Wanambi in 2019
- Born: 18 May 1962; Gurka'wuy, East Arnhem, NT, Australia
- Died: 1 May 2022 (aged 59); Darwin, Northern Territory
- Known for: Artist
- Father: Mithili Wanambi

Wukun Wanambi (18 May 1962 – 1 May 2022) was an Australian Yolngu painter, filmmaker, and curator of the Marrakulu clan of northeastern Arnhem Land, Northern Territory.

== Early life ==
Wukuṉ Waṉambi was born on 18 May 1962 Gurka'wuy, Arnhem Land, the eldest son in his family. His father, Mithili Wanambi, was an esteemed clan leader and renowned painter. Although he was born to a family of artists, he wished to be a politician growing up.

When Mithili died in 1981, sacred clan designs could no longer be painted because no one had the authority to paint them any more. It was not until 1997 that Djunggayi (caretakers and preservers of clan knowledge) taught Wanambi the designs.

== Career ==
From 1997, Wanambi began painting, re-introducing motifs that had not been painted since his father's death. He created works for the Saltwater Country exhibition. While Wanambi was an artist who used many different media, he is best known as a painter and sculptor who worked with natural pigments (ochres) on bark and traditional memorial poles, or larrakitj.

He also made prints at the Buku-Larrnggay Mulka Centre in Yirrkala. He served as the cultural director of The Mulka Project, the media centre in Buku-Larrŋgay Mulka, from its establishment in 2007 until his death. Through this position, he advised individuals on what they have the clan authority to depict in film. However, he was also a video artist himself, working to bridge generations by creating archival art that reconstructed ceremonial documentary archives. Rather than solidifying binaries of past and present, traditional and modern, Wanambi aimed to show the interconnectedness of time as well as the global network through the recording of ceremonial practices. Using both his artwork and his involvement with The Mulka Project, Wanambi advocated for the agency and involvement of Aboriginal peoples to cultivate a true understanding of Aboriginal cultures.

In 2014, he created his first multimedia artwork, Nhina, Nhäma Ga Ŋäma (Sit, Look and Listen), inspired by the cultural footage archive he was looking after. In 2019, he exhibited an expanded interactive version at Tarnanthi at the Art Gallery of South Australia in Adelaide. In 2020, he collaborated with the Mulka Team on Watami Manikay, now displayed at the AGNSW.

In 2017, Wanambi travelled to the United States to join the curatorial team for the exhibition Madayin: Eight Decades of Aboriginal Australian Art from Yirrkala at the Kluge-Ruhe Aboriginal Art Collection at the University of Virginia. This was Wanambi's first time working as a curator. In 2018 he served as curatorial consultant on the exhibition MIwatj at the La Trobe Art Institute.

== Awards ==
- 1998: National Aboriginal and Torres Strait Islander Art Awards (NATSIAA) – Best Bark Painting
- 2003: NATSIAA – Highly Commended (3D Work)
- 2007: Togart Contemporary Art Award (NT) - Winner of People's Choice
- 2010: NATSIAA – Wandjuk Marika 3D Memorial Award
- 2018: NATSIAA – Wandjuk Marika 3D Memorial Award

== Death and legacy ==
Wanambi died in Darwin on 1 May 2022. (Note: The date of death in this Sydney Morning Herald article (4 May), previously cited in this article, is incorrect: Latimore, Jack (4 May 2022). "Prominent Yolngu clan leader and artist Mr Wanambi dies". The Sydney Morning Herald.)

Two daughters, Dhukumul and Gaypalani Wanambi, are artists at the Buku-Larrnggay Mulka Centre in Yirrkala, with Dhukumul (his youngest) serving as a cultural director of The Mulka Project there. They were both taught to paint by their father.

== Collections ==
- Museum and Art Gallery of the Northern Territory
- Australian National Maritime Museum
- Sydney Opera House
- Harland Collection
- Kerry Stokes Collection
- NT Supreme Court-Wukidi
- Art Gallery of South Australia
- National Gallery of Australia
- Art Gallery of New South Wales
- Holmes à Court Collection
- Artbank
- Manly Regional Gallery
- Musée des Confluences, Lyon, France
- Colin and Liz Laverty, Sydney
- Museum of Contemporary Art, Sydney, NSW
- British Museum, London
- Kluge-Ruhe Aboriginal Art Collection of the University of Virginia

== Significant exhibitions ==
- 1998 NATSIAA
- 1998–2001 Saltwater
- 2001 18th NATSIAA, Museum and Art Gallery of the Northern Territory (MAGNT), Darwin
- 2001 New from Old, Annandale Galleries, Sydney, NSW.
- 2002 19th NATSIAA, MAGNT, Darwin
- 2003 Brighton International Art Festival UK
- 2003 Larrakitj Rebecca Hossack Gallery
- 2003 20th NATSIAA, MAGNT, Darwin
- 2004 Wukun Wanambi (first solo show) Raft 2, Darwin
- 2005 Wukun Wanambi Niagara Galleries, Melbourne
- 2005 Yakumirri, Raft Artspace (exhibition purchased by the Holmes a Court collection)
- 2005 22nd NATSIAA, MAGNT, Darwin
- 2005 'Yåkumirri', Holmes à Court Gallery, Perth Artbank: Celebrating 25 Years of Australian Art touring exhibition, nine regional galleries from Cairns to Bathurst
- 2006 TOGA NT Contemporary Art Award, Parliament House, Darwin
- 2006 Telstra NATSIAA
- 2006 Walking together to aid Aboriginal Health, Shalom College UNSW
- 2006 Bulayi- Small Gems, Suzanne O'Connell Gallery, Brisbane
- 2006 'Arnhem Land Ochres', Mina Mina Art Gallery, Brunswick Heads
- 2007 Galuku Gallery, Festival of Darwin, NT
- 2007 Bukulungthunmi - Coming Together, One Place, Raft Artspace, Darwin, NT
- 2008 Outside Inside - bark and hollow logs from Yirrkala, Bett Gallery Hobart, Tas
- 2008 Yarpany - Honey - bark paintings and Hollow Logs of the Marrakulu Clan, Framed Gallery, Darwin, NT
- 2008 Gapan Gallery - Bendt Prints, Garma Festival Site, Gulkula, NT.
- 2008 Galuku Gallery (Nomad Art Productions) - Berndt Prints, Darwin Festival, Botanical Gardens, Darwin, NT
- 2008, Wukun Wanambi - Niagara Galleries, Richmond, Vic
- 2009 Larrakitj - Kerry Stokes Collection, Art Gallery of Western Australia, Perth, WA
- 2009 After Berndt - Etchings from the Drawings, Indigenart Subiaco, WA
- 2009–2010 Almanac: Australian Art from the Gift of Ann Lewis AO, Museum of Contemporary Art, Sydney, NSW
- 2010 The White Show, Short Street Gallery, Broome, Western Australia
- 2010 17th Biennale of Sydney, Larrakitj - the Kerry Stokes Collection, Museum of Contemporary Art, Sydney, NSW
- 2010 Returning to Djakapurra - A Collection of Poles and Barks from Yirrkala, Redot Gallery, Singapore
- 2010 27th NATSIAA, MAGNT, Darwin, NT - Winner 3D category
- 2011 One Clan Three Hands, Niagara Galleries, Melbourne Vic 2011 Telstra NATSIAA, MAGNT Darwin NT
- 2011 Gapan Gallery, GARMA Festival, Northeast Arnhem Land, NT
- 2012 Three, Chan Contemporary Art Space, Darwin NT 2013. Finalist West Australian Indigenous Art Awards
- 2013 'Found' Annandale Galleries Sydney
- 2013 Gapan Gallery, GARMA Festival, Northeast Arnhem Land, NT
- 2014 Gapan Gallery, GARMA Festival, Northeast Arnhem Land, NT
- 2015 NATSIAA, MAGNT
- 2015 Enduring Civilisations, British Museum, London, UK
- 2015 Gapan Gallery GARMA Festival, Northeast Arnhem Land, NT
- 2015 Revolution, Nomad Art, Darwin NT
- 2015 Yirrkala Mob, Bangarra Boards, RAFT Art Space, Alice Springs, NT
- 2015 Unsettled, National Museum of Australia, Canberra
- 2019–2020 The Inside World: Contemporary Aboriginal Australian Memorial Poles, Nevada Museum of Art and touring
- 2022-2025 Maḏayin: Eight Decades of Aboriginal Australian Bark Painting from Yirrkala. Hood Museum of Art at Dartmouth College; American University Museum at the Katzen Arts Center; Fralin Museum of Art at the University of Virginia; and the Asia Society in New York City
