= Josh Muir =

Australian artist (1992–2022)

Josh Muir (1992–2022) was an Australian artist. His work dealt with themes related to Country, culture, identity, colonisation, mental health, generational trauma, addiction, loss and grief. Muir was born in Ballarat, Victoria in 1992, and died in February 2022. He was a Yorta Yorta, Gunditjmara and Barkindji man. He had two children with his partner Shanaya Sheridan.

== Exhibitions ==
A retrospective show, JXSH MVIR: Forever I Live, ran from March to July 2024 at the Koorie Heritage Trust.

In June 2024, Muir's work "Bellow With Pride Don't Hide" was displayed at Melbourne's Federation Square, presented as part of 'The Blak Infinite' program at the Rising festival.

== Collections ==
- National Gallery of Victoria (NGV), Melbourne
