= Journal of Language, Literature and Culture =

- Discipline: Literature
- Language: English
- Edited by: Emily Finlay

Publication details
- Former names: Journal of the Australasian Universities Language and Literature Association; AUMLA
- History: 1953–present
- Publisher: Taylor & Francis Online
- Frequency: Triannual

Standard abbreviations
- ISO 4: J. Lang. Lit. Cult.

Indexing
- ISSN: 2051-2856 (print); 2051-2864 (web)

Links
- Journal homepage

Journal of Language, Literature and Culture formerly known as Journal of the Australasian Universities Language and Literature Association or AUMLA (1953 –- 2012) is a triannual peer-reviewed literary journal published by Taylor & Francis Online on behalf of the Australasian Universities Language and Literature Association.
