= Ngarralja Tommy May =

Aboriginal Australian artist (1935–2022)

Ngarralja Tommy May was an Indigenous Australian artist. He won the 2020 NATSIAA Telstra Award for his tin-etching art, 'Wirrkanja'. May died in 2022.

He was a Wangkajungka/Walmajarri man born in Yarrnkurnja in the Great Sandy Desert, in 1935. His work is in the collection of the Art Gallery of Western Australia.

== Work ==
In 1997, May collaborated with over 40 other artists over a period of 12 days to produce Ngurrara Canvas II, a painting with an area of 80 square metres depicting the Great Sandy Desert. In 2019, May and four other artists worked with Lisa Gorman on limited edition clothing.
