= Sally Scales =

Australian artist

- Born: 1989 (age 36–37); Australia
- Occupation: Artist

Sally Scales (born 1989) is an Aboriginal Australian artist and activist from South Australia.

== Early life ==
Sally Scales was born in 1989. She is the daughter of Josephine Mick, cultural leader and senior artist at Ninuku Arts, and the late Ushma Scales, leather-maker and one of the co-founders of Maruku Arts and the APY Ara Irititja cultural archive. Her grandmother (Kami), was respected artist Kunmanara Wawiriya Burton, who died in March 2021.

Scales is a Pitjantjatjara woman from Pipalyatjara, South Australia in the northwestern part of the Anangu Pitjantjatjara Yankunytjatjara (APY) lands.

== Career ==
=== Leadership roles ===
Scales is a member of the National Gallery of Australia Council, an independent elected board member of the Australian Children’s Television Foundation and a member of Bangarra Dance Theatre board.

She is the youngest person and second woman to serve as the position of chair of the APY Executive Board Council. She is also a spokeswoman for the APY Art Centre Collective (APYACC), an Aboriginal-owned and -governed cultural enterprise group,

Scales is part of the Uluru Declaration Reform Youth Leadership Team, having participated in the Referendum Council regional Constitution dialogues in Ross River, Adelaide, and the national convention in Uluru in 2017. Since then, she has been involved with the leadership of Voice, Treaty and Truth. In 2022, she was appointed to the group working with the Australian Government ahead of the Voice to Parliament referendum.

== Art practice and consultancy ==
Scales took up painting in 2020, during the COVID-19 pandemic in Australia. She had her first exhibition at APY Gallery Adelaide in March–May 2021, alongside paintings by her mother Josephine Mick, which sold out. The exhibition, titled Irititja – Old, Kuwaritja – New, Ngali – Us (a generation story), was opened by Ben Quilty.

Scales also undertakes consultancy work for the Art Gallery of South Australia. She has worked on a number of projects for them, including taking the 2020 Kulata Tjuta touring exhibition to France.

== Awards and recognition ==
Scales won the National Aboriginal and Torres Strait Islander Art Awards (NATSIAA) People's Choice Award in 2021, and was named a finalist in the 2022 NATSIAAs. She was a finalist for the Roberts Family Award in 2022 (Wynne Landscape prize) for her work "Wati Tjakura".

In 2022 she was named in the BBC's list of the 100 Women, nominated by former Australian Prime Minister Julia Gillard, who noted that Scales "created wonderful art and broad human understanding. By illuminating and inspiring others, she catalyses the many changes needed to end the pernicious combination of racism and sexism".

== Personal life ==
Scales is the adoptive mother of a son named Walter.
