= Pantjiti Mary McLean =

Australian Aboriginal artist (died 2023)

Pantjiti Mary McLean (c. 1930 – 1 July 2023) was an Australian Ngaatjajarra Aboriginal artist.

== Life ==
Pantjiti Mary McLean was born circa 1930 in Kaltukatjara, Docker River, Western Australia. She met her husband Mr. Bates at Blackstone. In the 1950s she left the Western Desert walking with her husband and son to the Warburton Ranges, and then to Cosmo Newbury in the Eastern Goldfields. According to government policy of that time local Aboriginal children were to be raised and schooled by the missionaries at Mount Margaret Mission where McLean's son went too. When McLean's daughter was born, she was also taken away from her. While children were at the mission McLean was directed to work on the district sheep station where she chose to be a station hand mustering the sheep.

In the 1970s McLean moved to the Kalgoorlie Native Reserve, and then in the 1980s to the Ninga Mia Community in Kalgoorlie, where she lived until 2008. She later resided at a local aged care home in Kalgoorlie-Boulder. McLean died there on 1 July 2023.

== Art ==
During the 1980s McLean produced craftworks and traditional paintings. In 1992 she participated in the Warta Kutju (Wama Wanti) Street Art Project, where she met fibre artist Nalda Searles. Starting from 1992 McLean's paintings have been exhibited widely.

In 1993, she created her famous painting Hunting grounds depicting the ripe quandong fruit, the ripples on the surface of the waterholes, the scampering of the goanna and the laughter and song of her people. The same year a sell-out exhibition of her work in Fremantle launched her career. Throughout the 1990s she worked with artist Nalda Searles as part of the Healthway Fringe Camp Project and developed her distinctive painterly style. In 1995, McLean received a prestigious Telstra Indigenous Award.

In 2001, she was awarded an Honorary Doctorate of Letters from the Curtin University of Technology in Perth. In 2005 a book with a catalogue for a retrospective exhibition Pantjiti Mary McLean: A Big Story: Paintings and Drawings 1992–2005 was published in Adelaide. McLean's paintings are represented in all major public and many private collections around Australia.

== Selected exhibitions ==
- 1992 Central Australian Aboriginal Art & Craft, Araluen Centre, Alice Springs NT
- 1993 Hunting Grounds, Fremantle Arts Centre, Fremantle WA
- 1993 Border Art workshops Indigenous Arts exhibition, San Diego USA
- 1994 Bush Women, Fremantle Arts Centre, Perth, WA
- 1994 Gallery of Aboriginal and South Pacific Art, Sydney NSW
- 1995 12th National Aboriginal Art Award, MAGNT, Darwin NT
- 1995 Pantjiti Mary McLean. Survey Exhibition, Australia House, London UK
- 1995 Aboriginal & South Pacific Gallery, Sydney NSW
- 1996 Telstra National Aboriginal Art Award, MAGNT, Darwin NT
- 1996 Pantjti Mary McLean Recent Painting, Boomalli Aboriginal Artists Cooperative, Sydney NSW
- 1996 Language of the Land, Goldfields Art Centre with Nalda Searles, Kalgoorlie WA
- 1997 Telstra National Aboriginal Art Award, MAGNT, Darwin NT
- 1997 Off Shore On Site, Festival of the Dreaming, Casula Powerhouse Arts, Sydney NSW
- 1998 Pantjti Mary Mclean, Recent Paintings, Hogarth Gallery, Adelaide SA
- 1998 Telstra National Aboriginal Art Award, MAGNT, Darwin NT
- 1999 Go Along Now. Mustering Series, Fremantle Art Centre, Fremantle WA
- 2000 Hogarth Gallery Sydney NSW2000 “Side by Side”, Art Gallery of Western Australia
- 2000 Yuwayi Art Centre, Sydney NSW
- 2000 Telstra Award Winners Exhibition, Customs House, Sydney NSW
- 2001 Mary McLwean & Minnie Pwerle, Japingka Gallery, Fremantle WA
- 2005 Pantjiti Mary McLean: A Big Story, Paintings and drawings 1992–2005, Tandanya National Aboriginal Cultural Institute Inc., Adelaide SA
- 2014 Desert Song, Japingka Gallery, Fremantle WA

== Collections ==
- ArtBank
- Art Gallery of Western Australia
- Art Gallery of New South Wales
- Australian Capital Equity
- Berndt Museum of Anthropology, University of Western Australia
- City of Fremantle
- City of Perth
- Cruthers Collection of Women's Art
- Edith Cowan University
- Holmes à Court Collection
- Museum & Art Gallery of the Northern Territory
- National Gallery of Australia, Canberra
- National Gallery of Victoria, Melbourne
- Queensland State Art Gallery
- Tandanya Aboriginal Arts Centre, Adelaide
- University of Wollongong
