= Derek P. Scales =

Australian scholar

- Born: 3 July 1921
- Died: 28 August 2004 (aged 83)

Academic background
- Education: University of Sydney (BA), University of Paris (PhD)
- Influences: Aldous Huxley, Alphonse Karr

Derek Percival Scales (3 July 1921 – 28 August 2004) was an Australian literary scholar and former Professor of French and Dean of Faculty of Arts at the Australian National University. He was known for his works on Aldous Huxley and Alphonse Karr.

== Books ==
- Alphonse Karr: sa vie et son oeuvre (1808-1890), Derek P. Scales, Droz 1959
- Aldous Huxley and French literature, Derek P. Scales, Sydney University Press 1969
