= Tjanpi Desert Weavers =

Australian NPY region weavers

Tjanpi Desert Weavers is a social enterprise of the NPY Women's Council, representing over 400 women from 26 unique communities in the NPY (Ngaanyatjarra, Pitjantjatjara and Yankunytjatjara) region. Tjanpi is the Pitjantjatjara word for a type of spinifex grass. The weavers harvest and weave local grasses and some other materials to create handmade works and pieces of art. In producing these works, which mostly consist of baskets, jewellery, beads and fibre sculpture, the enterprise encourages women's employment and economic independence.

== History ==
Grass weaving is not a traditional pursuit in Central Australia, but once shown the basics in 1995, the women quickly applied their existing skills in spinning human hair, animal fur, string and wool. By building on these existing skills, and working together, the Tjanpi weavers maintain a strong cultural connection and connection to each other and, as a part of the program, the women come together to collect grass for their art as well as hunt, gather food, visit sacred sites, perform inma (cultural song and dance), and teach younger people.

The social enterprise of the work also enables the women to 'stay on Country' and, as one senior artist says:

We don't have to leave our lands to be basket makers

— Paniny Mick, Tjanpi Desert Weavers

The Tjanpi have a public gallery in Alice Springs.

== Exhibitions and awards ==
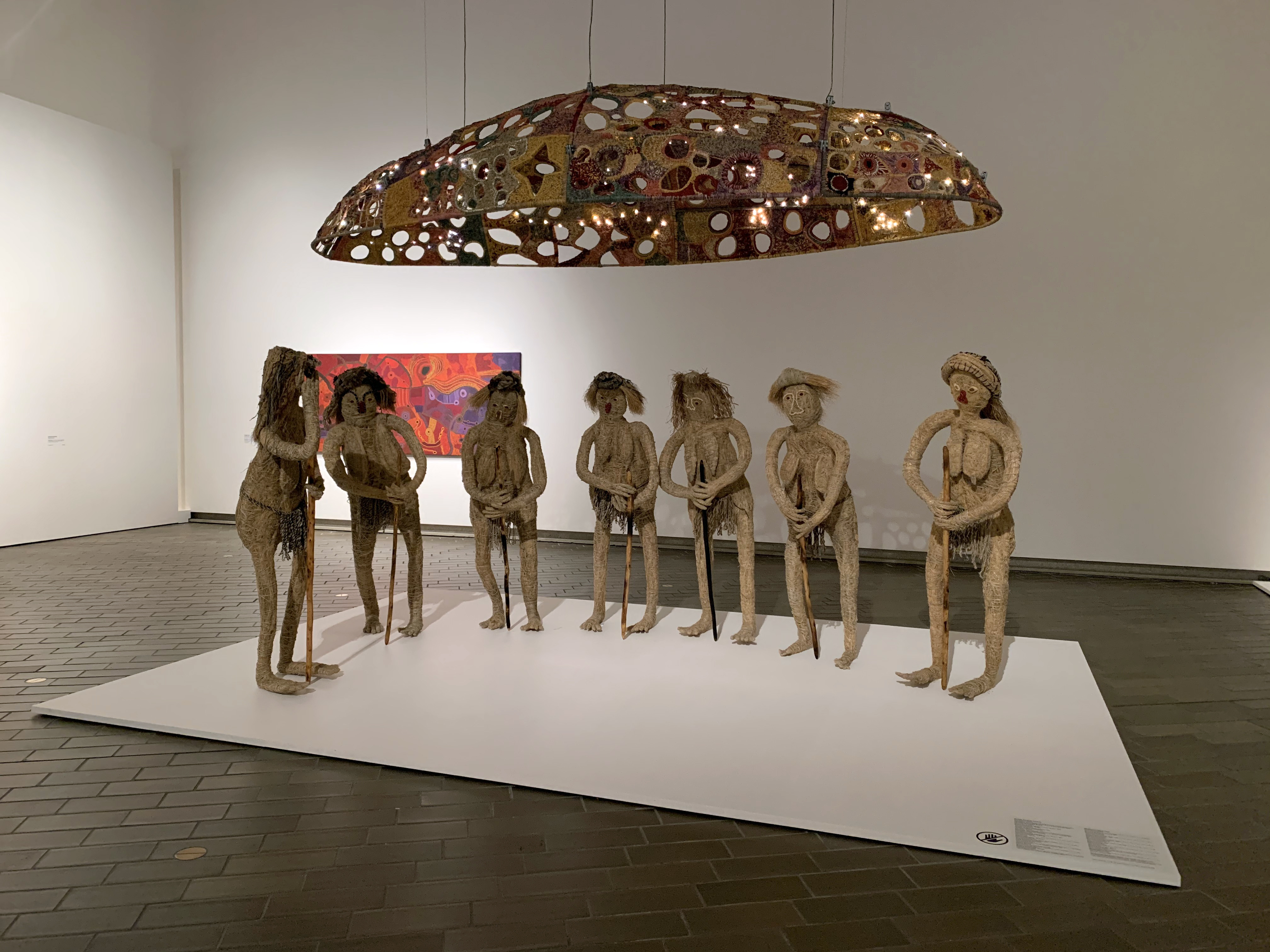
Tjanpi Desert Weavers at the Know My Name exhibition at the National Gallery of Australia in Canberra.

The Tjanpi Desert Weavers are represented in national and international public and private art collections. In 2005 a collective of 18 artists won the Telstra National Aboriginal and Torres Strait Islander Art Award for their work Tjanpi Toyota.

A collaborative work between Tjanpi Desert Weavers and artist Fiona Hall, Kuka Irititja (Animals from Another Time), originally created for the TarraWarra Biennial, formed part of the 2015 Venice Biennale. A major project with the National Museum of Australia, led to the work, Kungkarrangkalnga-ya Parrpakanu (The Seven Sisters Are Flying) in 2017.

A large-scale installation, telling the story of Kungkarangkalpa (Seven Sisters Dreaming) was commissioned as a feature of the National Gallery of Australia's 2020 Know My Name Exhibition.

== Artists ==
Tjanpi Desert Weaver artists include the following artists:

- Kanytjupayi Benson
- Nyurpaya Kaika-Burton
- Roma Butler
- Yangi Yangi Fox
- Niningka Lewis, aka Kunmanara Lewis (1945-2020)
- Paniny Mick
- Mary Katatjuku Pan
- Tjunkaya Tapaya
- Carlene Thompson
- Ilawanti Ungkutjuru
- Yaritji Young

Renowned Betty Muffler of Iwantja Arts has also made baskets for Tjanpi Desert Weavers.
