= National Aboriginal & Torres Strait Islander Art Award =

Annual Australian Indigenous art award established in 1984, awarded in Darwin, NT

The National Aboriginal & Torres Strait Islander Art Award (NATSIAA) is Australia's longest running Indigenous art award. Established in 1984 as the National Aboriginal Art Award by the Museum and Art Gallery of the Northern Territory in Darwin, and also referred to as the Telstra National Aboriginal & Torres Strait Islander Art Award, the Telstra Award, or Telstra Prize, it is open to all Aboriginal and Torres Strait Islander artists working in all media.

As of 2022 the top prize was worth A$100,000, and the total prize pool A$190,000, making it as of August 2022 the richest art prize in the country.

== History ==
The awards were established in 1984 as the National Aboriginal Art Award. Telstra has sponsored the awards since 1992.

The Darwin Aboriginal Art Fair began as a complement to NATSIAA, but is now a separate event under the umbrella of the Darwin Festival.

In 2000, the prize money for the main award was doubled from A$20,000 to A$40,000. It was increased to A$50,000 in 2014, making it the largest prize for any Indigenous art award. In 2022, the main prize was doubled to A$100,000, making it equivalent to Australia's richest art prize, the Archibald Prize for portraiture. The total prize pool, at A$190,000, makes it as of August 2022 the richest art prize in the country. Each of the category awards tripled from A$5,000 to A$15,000 at the same time.

== Categories ==
As of 2022 there are six categories of awards as well as the main prize:

- Telstra Art Award ("The Big One") – A$100,000
- Telstra General Painting Award
- Telstra Bark Painting Award
- Telstra Works on Paper Award
- Wandjuk Marika 3D Memorial Award
- Telstra Multimedia Award
- Telstra Emerging Artist Award

== List of winners ==
- List of NATSIAA award winners
