= Tony Albert =

Contemporary Australian artist (born 1981)

- Born: 1981 (age 44–45); Townsville, Queensland, Australia
- Education: Queensland College of Art
- Known for: Installation, mixed media, photography, painting

Tony Albert (born 1981) is a contemporary Aboriginal Australian artist working in a wide range of mediums, including painting, photography, and mixed media. He became the first Aboriginal Australian official war artist in 2012, and curated the 5th National Indigenous Art Triennial, After the rain, in 2025. His work is represented in major galleries and has been featured in many exhibitions.

== Early life and education ==
Tony Albert was born in 1981 in Townsville, North Queensland. Albert's family is from Cardwell, Queensland and he is a descendant of the Girramay, Yidinji, and Kuku-Yalanji peoples. His grandfather, Eddie Albert, enlisted in the Australian Army in 1940, serving in the Middle East before becoming a prisoner of war in Germany and Italy. Tony Albert has been inspired by his grandfather's service and postwar experience as an Aboriginal returned serviceman.

In 2004 he graduated from the Queensland College of Art, Griffith University, Brisbane, with a degree in Contemporary Australian Indigenous Art.

== Art practice and career ==
Albert works in a range of mediums, including painting, photography, and mixed media. His work engages with political, historical, and cultural Aboriginal and Australian history, and his fascination with kitsch "Aboriginalia".

Albert was a founding member of the urban-based Indigenous art collective ProppaNOW founded in 2004. ProppaNOW also included artists Richard Bell, Jennifer Herd, Vernon Ah Kee, Fiona Foley, Bianca Beetson, and Andrea Fisher.

Like Bell and Ah Kee, the use of text is essential to Albert's practice. Headhunter (2007), an installation consisted of various objects Albert had been collecting for several years, portrays the past racism in Australia and puts emphasis on "the commodification of Aboriginal people for consumption by the non-Indigenous population, at a time when actual engagements with Aboriginal people were rare and predominantly paternalistic."

The application of text can also be seen in Albert's photographic work such as Hey ya! (Shake it like a Polaroid picture) (2007).

Albert curated the 5th National Indigenous Art Triennial, After the rain, which featured 10 large-scale multidisciplinary art installations. It took place at the National Gallery of Australia in Canberra from 6 December 2025 until 26 April 2026, and subsequently toured to other galleries around the country, with its last scheduled showing at Orange Regional Gallery, Orange, NSW, in mid-2028.

== Awards and commissions ==
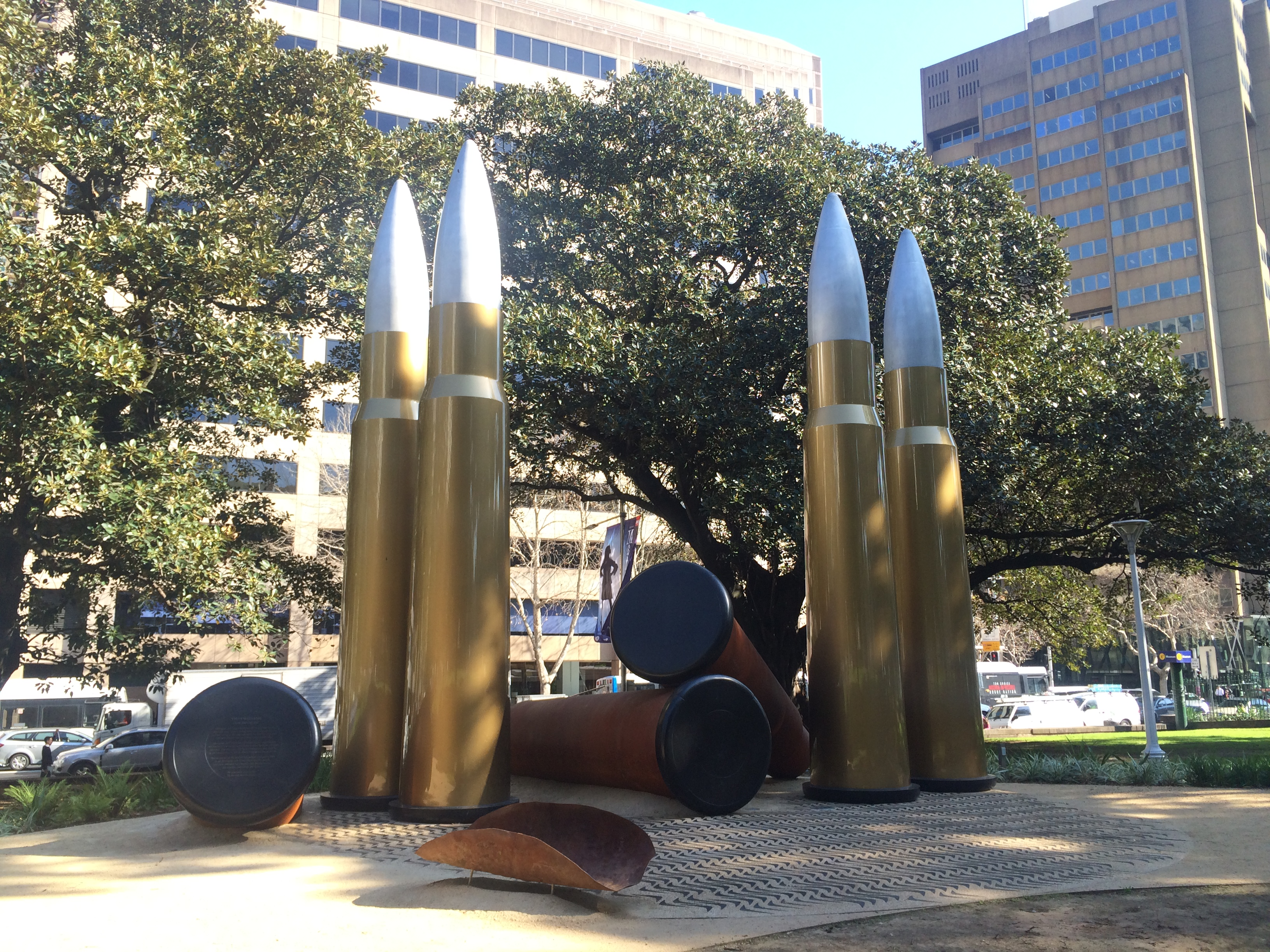
Yininmadyemi - Thou didst let fall in Hyde Park, Sydney

In 2012, Albert became the first Aboriginal Australian official war artist, and was the first artist to be attached to the Regional Surveillance Force of the Australian Army's North West Mobile Unit (NORFORCE). He trained with the new army recruits at Kangaroo Flats Training Area south of Darwin.

In 2014 Albert won first prize in the National Aboriginal & Torres Strait Islander Art Award with his work We can be Heroes, prompted by the 2012 shooting by police of two Aboriginal teenagers in Kings Cross. Albert's was the first photographic work to win the prize.

In 2015, Albert was commissioned by the City of Sydney to create Yininmadyemi - Thou didst let fall, a public work for Hyde Park, Sydney. The work serves as a memorial to Aboriginal military history and features four large upright bullets and shell casings.

In 2016 and 2017, Albert's self-portraits were finalists in the Archibald Prize.

== Exhibitions ==
Albert's work has been the subject of several solo exhibitions and over 50 group exhibitions.

In mid-2012, his work featured in the 2nd National Indigenous Art Triennial: unDISCLOSED at the National Gallery of Australia in Canberra.

In June 2024, Albert's work Crop Circles In Yoga #5 as well as his large-scale artwork BEAM ME UP The Art of Abduction were exhibited in Melbourne's Federation Square as part of "The Blak Infinite" program at the 2024 RISING: festival in Melbourne.

== Collections ==
- Art Gallery of NSW
- National Gallery of Victoria
