= Vernon Ah Kee =

Indigenous Australian artist

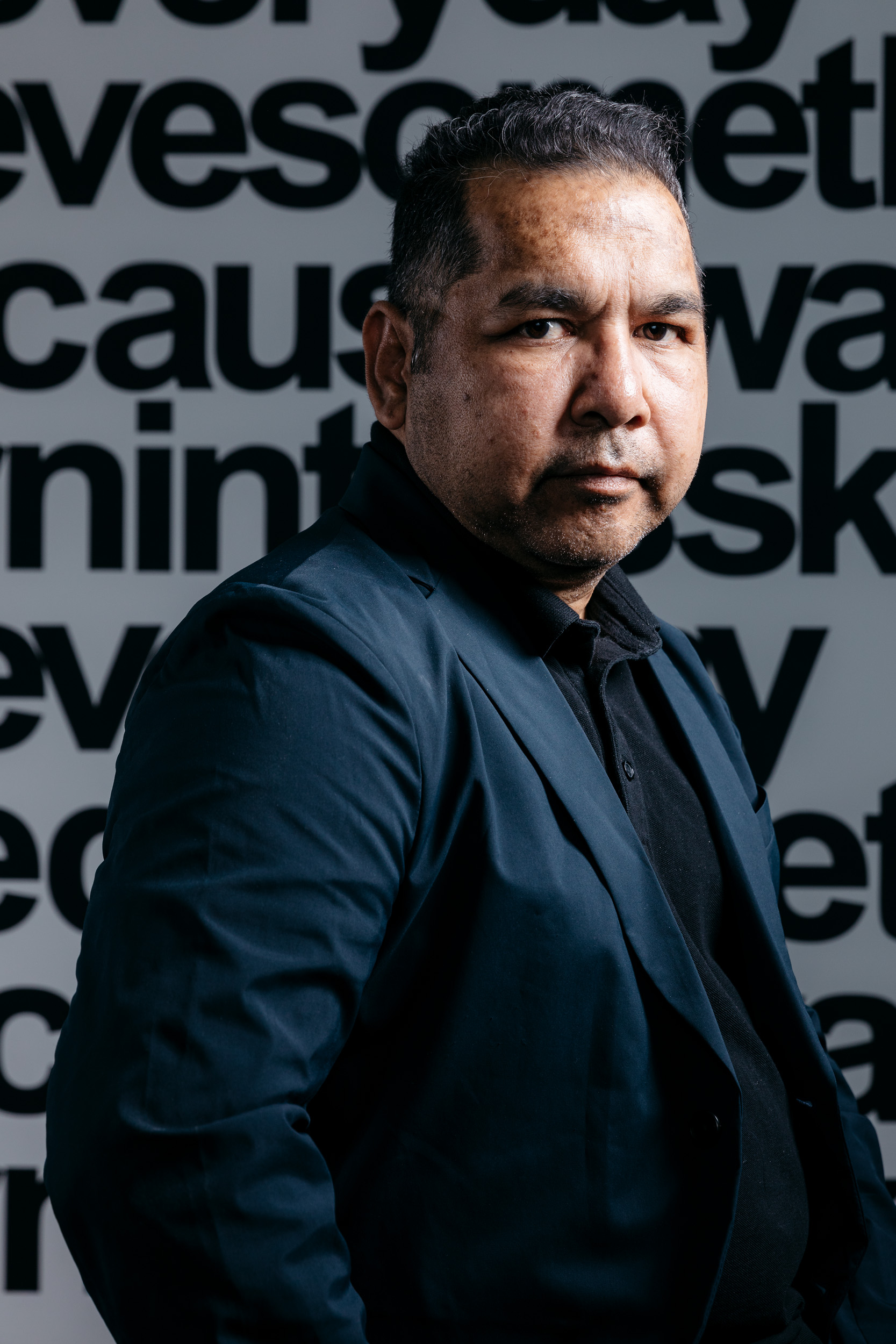
- Born: 1967 (age 58–59); Innisfail, Queensland, Australia
- Education: Queensland College of Art
- Known for: Painting, text art, installation art, mixed media
- Notable work: Tall Man
- Movement: Urban Indigenous art
- Awards: 2012 Finalist, Archibald Prize; 2012 Visual Artist of the Year, Deadly Awards; 2014 Redlands Konica Minolta Art Prize; 2018 Australia Council Visual Arts Fellowship

Vernon Ah Kee (born 1967) is a contemporary Australian artist, political activist and founding member of ProppaNOW. Based primarily in Brisbane, Queensland, Ah Kee is an Aboriginal Australian man with ties to the Kuku Yalandji, Waanji, Yidinji and Gugu Yimithirr peoples in Queensland. His art practice typically focuses on his Aboriginal Australian identity and place within a modern Australian framework, and is concerned with themes of skin, skin colour, race, privilege and racism. Ah Kee has exhibited his art at numerous galleries across Australia, including the Art Gallery of New South Wales (AGNSW) and the Museum of Contemporary Art Australia, and has also exhibited internationally, most notably representing Australia at the 2009 Venice Biennale and the 2015 Istanbul Biennial.

Ah Kee has a very diverse art practice, using a broad range of techniques and media such as painting, installation, photography and text-based art. He is particularly renowned for his manipulation of colonial language and imagery to highlight racial issues in Australia. His works are hosted in both public and private collections around the world.

In 2003, Ah Kee, along with other Indigenous Australian artists Richard Bell, Jennifer Herd and Joshua Herd, created ProppaNOW – an organisation dedicated to supporting urban Indigenous artists in Brisbane and combating cultural stereotypes.

== Personal life and education ==
Ah Kee was born in Innisfail, Queensland, in 1967 to Merv and Margaret Ah Kee, who were Indigenous rights activists. Like most other Indigenous people in Australia, the family was not included in the population census until 1971. As well as his Aboriginal heritage, he also has some Chinese ancestry from his great-grandfather, but Ah Kee has stated that he identifies more with his Indigenous heritage, saying "I think of myself as a Rainforest Aboriginal, a Buma".

His family moved to Cairns when he was 12 years old, and Ah Kee sketched avidly at this time. He attended only Catholic schools, in Cairns going to St Augustine's College (a Marist Brothers school).

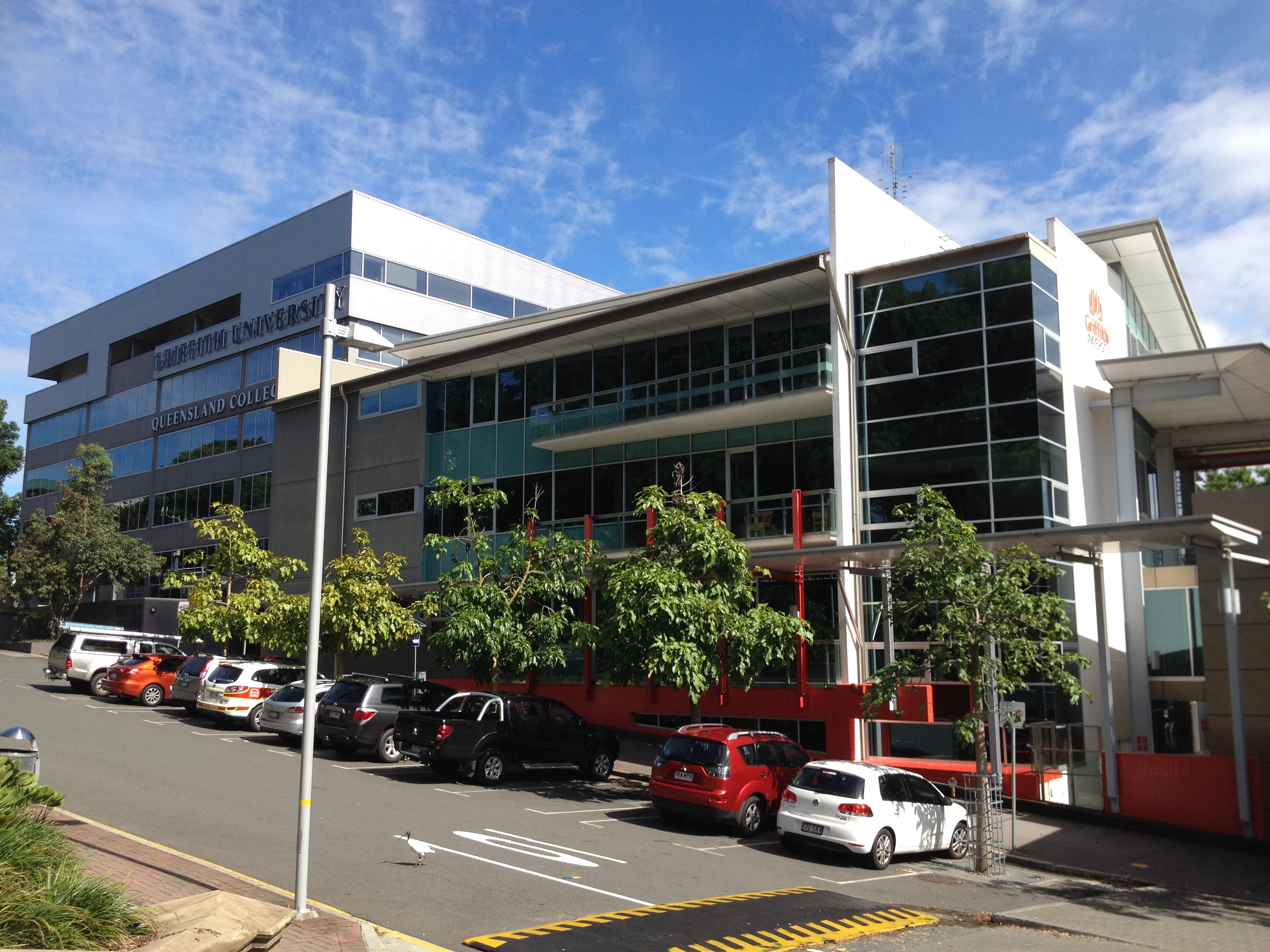
Queensland College of Art

After attending Cairns TAFE where he learned screen printing, Ah Kee started his Bachelor of Visual Art at Queensland College of Art in Brisbane in 1996. He majored in Contemporary Indigenous Australian art and earned his degree in 1998. He then went on to do honours in fine art from 1999 to 2000, and then completed a doctorate in fine art from 2001 to 2007. During his studies, he had two solo exhibitions hosted at his college's art gallery as part of his postgraduate work – whitefella normal blackfella me in 2000 and con Text in 2007.

In 2014, his father died in a car accident. In 2017 Ah Kee drew Portrait of My Father, a task that he described as a "labour of love".

Ah Kee suffered a heart attack in 2016 but managed to recover in time for his 2017 exhibition Not an animal or a plant.

== Career ==
=== Art practice ===
While Ah Kee incorporates a broad range of different art mediums, from life drawings to video installations, a consistent theme across all of his artworks is his examination of racism in Australia. Ah Kee has said that his art practice has been influenced by a wide range of artists and styles, but most significantly by other Indigenous artists such as Kevin Gilbert, Trevor Nickolls, Richard Bell and Gordon Bennett, stating that "I can see my own life and history" in their artworks. In particular, Bell and Bennett's manipulation of colonial text and images encouraged him to broaden his art practice and experiment with media beyond drawing - the text art, in particular, is a common technique among ProppaNOW artists. He also credits the politics of Malcolm X and James Baldwin, two prominent African American activists, as early inspirations for both his art practice and personal activism, as well as Barbara Kruger's propaganda-inspired art.

Many of his text-based artworks ("word art") contain colonial language that have been manipulated and rewritten to create a secondary meaning, such as his 2003 austracism being a play on the word "ostracism", and 2009 becauseitisbitter appropriating a poem from American poet Stephen Crane to portray an Indigenous experience of contemporary Australia. It has been suggested that the black and white text introduces the concept of racial relations in Australia and that the word play makes the audience think more deeply on the issues represented. The Museum of Contemporary Art Australia described his text-based art as "...point[ing] to prejudices and agendas embedded in Australian society and politics. These puns and words-within-words fuse the history and language of colonisation with contemporary experiences and issues".

Ah Kee has also engaged with drawing and painting mediums to highlight the modern Indigenous experience. fantasies of the good (2004) is a series of 13 detailed charcoal life drawings of different members of Ah Kee's family, who are all identified by name. The series uses a mug-shot style and is suggested to reference the documentation of Indigenous Australians by some anthropologists in the twentieth century; the Indigenous people who were documented were unnamed and the works were rather referred to by numbers. Ah Kee wanted to convey Australia's history of racism and has stated that "These drawings and what they represent are my evidence". His 2012 portrait, I see deadly people: Lex Wotton, depicted the titular man through bold paint strokes. Ah Kee explained that Wotton's actions during the Palm Island Riots led to him being negatively misrepresented in the media, and the artist decided that "Lex should look bold and brave" in his portrait. His 2012 exhibition of large, detailed charcoal and crayon portraits featured in the exhibition Transforming Tindale at the State Library of Queensland was based on that library's collection of anthropological photographs taken by Norman Tindale, and included some of Ah Kee's relatives.

Ah Kee has used video installation art, most notably in his exhibition Tall Man, to create confronting reflections of Australian racism. In Tall Man, Ah Kee collected and edited, alongside filmmaker and producer Alex Barnes, footage from the Palm Island riots, an event that occurred after the death of Indigenous man Cameron Doomadgee in police custody, and retold the controversial story from an Indigenous perspective. The installation played across four screens and juxtaposed a peaceful representation of Palm Island with the chaos of the riots, concluding with footage of protesters holding up signs with Christian-related statements such as "Thou shalt not covet the land no more". Maura Reilly suggests this was to reference the hypocrisy of white Australian Christians in their treatment of Indigenous peoples. In 2021, Tall Man was included in Tate Modern's 2021 exhibition A Year in Art: Australia 1992, an exhibition dedicated to Indigenous art relating to land rights and the 1992 Eddie Mabo High Court Decision.

His recent work, the island, also features a video installation, in which Ah Kee highlights Australia's 'brutal' immigration system through the recounting of an Afghan refugee couple's story, rather than wholly focusing on the experiences of Indigenous Australians.

=== proppaNOW ===
Along with Richard Bell, Jennifer Herd and Joshua Herd, all artists based in Brisbane, Ah Kee is a founding member of proppaNOW. Bell had stated in 2002: "Aboriginal art – its a white thing", saying that the industry was controlled by white people, a sentiment echoed by Ah Kee. The ProppaNOW artists seek to refute the white belief that remote Indigenous Australians are the only true Aboriginal people, and to re-establish the presence of urban Indigenous people in society. The founding members created the organisation after the government's Queensland Indigenous Artists Marketing Export Agency (QIAMEA) appeared to focus more on Indigenous artists from rural communities than on those from urban areas.

At a Canberra proppaNOW exhibition in 2007, Ah Kee displayed his artwork You Deicide. Senior Curator at the National Museum of Australia, Margo Neale, suggested that the work's deliberate misuse of deicide was a comment on the role of Christian-based religions in the "cultural terrorism" of Aboriginal people, and that the manipulation of colonial language in the work was a common "tactical device used by the proppaNOW artists".

=== Dark + Disturbing ===
Dark + Disturbing is a curatorial project by Ah Kee. In August 2015, he mounted the exhibition Dark + Disturbing: Gordon Hookey for proppaNOW at the Cairns Indigenous Art Fair, featuring the work of fellow collaborator in proppaNow, Gordon Hookey.

== Reception ==
=== Reviews and criticisms of his art ===
Ah Kee has generally received positive reviews of his art, often being praised for his clever reinventions of colonial language to highlight racism in Australia and noted for the dual personal and political nature of his art. His Tall Man exhibition, a video and text installation of the Palm Island Riots, was called a "smartly composed yet painful examination of racial relations in Australia" by Art Asia Pacific Magazine.

Art critic and broadcaster Andrew Frost reviewed some of Ah Kee's works at the Sydney Festival and quotes the artist: "this is not history, this is my life" and "this is not political, it's personal". Frost gave particular praise for the artist's charcoal drawings of his family, the form referencing the documentation of Indigenous peoples by 20th century anthropologists, finding that Ah Kee was personalising a traditionally impersonal genre.

When Ah Kee was awarded the Redlands Konica Minolta Art Prize, one of the judges, National Art School curator Judith Blackall, also noted the dual political and personal nature of Ah Kee's work and how it impacts the audience. In regard to his portrait of Lex Wotton, she stated that “Vernon’s masterful drawing technique of charcoal and acrylic paint on canvas goes from strength to strength. This portrait is particularly powerful as it shows Lex Wotton – who the artist knows well as he is married to Vernon’s cousin – in profile, with an intense gaze. Importantly, the story behind the portrait is of great significance, both personally for the artist and politically for Australia".

In Ah Kee's 2020 exhibition, The Island, Andrew Brooks suggested that the show was criticising the romanticised, white settler mythology of Australia and was trying to remind the audience of Australia's indigenous presence. Unlike Frost, Brooks determined the inclusion of the Yuendumu doors to be "a powerful statement about the continuity of Indigenous sovereignty in this country", especially in their juxtaposition with the Walpiri Dreamtime paintings. Brooks judged that the contrast between the racist graffiti of Yuendumu doors and the "vibrant" Dreamtime paintings indicated that indigenous culture was more than what white Australian culture limited it to be.

=== Awards ===
In 2012, Ah Kee was a finalist for the Art Gallery of New South Wales' Archibald Prize with his portrait I see deadly people: Lex Wotton. Wootton man is Ah Kee's cousin-in-law and was a key figure in the Palm Island Riots of 2004. In the same year, Ah Kee was also awarded Visual Artist of the Year in the Deadly Awards, the National Aboriginal & Torres Strait Islander Music, Sport, Entertainment & Community Awards.

In 2014, the A$25,000 Redlands Konika Minolta established artist prize was awarded to Ah Kee for his charcoal rendition of Lex Wotton.

In 2018, Ah Kee was awarded a Visual Arts Fellowship by the Australia Council for the Arts. The fellowship is worth up to A$80,000 and awarded to prominent artists in mid-career. Ah Kee planned to use his fellowship grant to exhibit his work in England and at other galleries abroad, as well as to produce new artworks.

== Media ==
In 2020 Ah Kee featured as one of six Indigenous artists in the ABC TV series This Place: Artist Series. The series is a partnership between the Australian Broadcasting Corporation and the National Gallery of Australia, in which the producers travelled to the countries of "some of Australia's greatest Indigenous artists to share stories about their work, their country, and their communities".

In 2010 Ah Kee was also featured in the ABC Arts documentary "Not A Willing Participant" directed by Alex Barnes and Produced by Justin Morrissey, which followed his exhibition at the 2009 Venice Biennale.

== Exhibitions ==
As of 31 December 2019, Ah Kee had displayed his art at 30 solo exhibitions and 100 group exhibitions, all around the world. He continues to create and exhibit his art in 2020, with plans to exhibit more of his work abroad. His exhibitions include:

Exhibition History
Year	Exhibition	Exhibition Type	Gallery	Place	Country
1999	If I was White	Solo	Metro Arts Centre	Brisbane	Australia
2000	The Which Way	Solo	Queensland College of Art Gallery	Brisbane	Australia
2001	whitefella normal blackfella me	Solo (Postgraduate)	Queensland College of Art Gallery	Brisbane	Australia
2002	non-People	Solo	Bellas Gallery	Brisbane	Australia
2002	Transit Narratives	Group	Centro per la Arti Visive LE VENEZIE	Treviso	Italy
2002	Transit Narratives	Group	Salone espositivo	Auronzo di Cadore	Italy
2002	Municipio	Group	Queensland College of Art Gallery	Brisbane	Australia
2002	Municipio	Group	Victorian College of the Arts	Melbourne	Australia
2003	consent	Solo	Gallery 1 of the Institute of Modern Art	Brisbane	Australia
2003	Places That Name Us	Group	Ian Potter Museum of Art	Melbourne	Australia
2003	1 Square Mile, Brisbane Boundaries	Group	Museum of Brisbane	Brisbane	Australia
2003	Abstractions	Group	The Drill Hall	Canberra, ACT	Australia
2003	This Is Not America	Group	(unmentioned)	Düsseldorf	Germany
2003	This Is Not America	Group	Queensland College of Art	Brisbane	Australia
2003	Story Place: Indigenous Art of Cape York and the Rainforest	Group	Queensland Art Gallery	Brisbane	Australia
2003	4 x 4	Group	Institute of Modern Art	Brisbane	Australia
2003	5 White Cubes	Group	Forum Kunst Art Residency	Rottweil	Germany
2003	Feedback: Art, Social Consciousness and Resistance	Group	Museum of Art	Melbourne	Australia
2004	fantasies of the good	Solo	Bellas Milani Gallery	Brisbane	Australia
2004	skin	Group	Long Gallery, Salamanca Arts Centre	Hobart, Tas.	Australia
2004	Cultural Copy: Visual Conversations on Indigenous Art and Cultural Appropriation	Group	Fowler Museum of Cultural History	Los Angeles	USA
2004	blak insights: Contemporary Indigenous Art from the Queensland Art Gallery	Group	Queensland Art Gallery	Brisbane	Australia
2004	ART TV 2004: Australian Culture Now	Group	Australian Centre for the Moving Image	Melbourne	Australia
2004	Spirit and Vision: Aboriginal Art	Group	Sammlung Essl—Kunsthaus	Klosterneuburg	Austria
2005	you must hit	Solo	Bellas Milani Gallery	Brisbane	Australia
2005	mythunderstanding	Solo	Contemporary Art Centre of South Australia	Adelaide	Australia
2005	ARC Art	Group	Design & Craft Biennial, Brisbane City Hall	Brisbane	Australia
2005	Thick and Fast	Group	The Powerhouse	Brisbane	Australia
2005	Art Urbain du Pacific	Group	Diff’ Art Pacific, The Castle of St-Auvent	Saint Auvent	France
2005	The Grey Voice	Group	Tin Sheds Gallery	Sydney	Australia
2005	Untitled	Group	The Lane Gallery	Auckland	New Zealand
2005	Face Value: Video portraiture from the Pacific	Group	Ivan Dougherty Gallery	Sydney	Australia
2005	Face Value: Video portraiture from the Pacific	Group	Museum of Brisbane	Brisbane	Australia
2006	not an animal or a plant	Solo	Bellas Milani Gallery	Brisbane	Australia
2006	Yours, Mine, Ours: The ABC of Everything	Group	Campbelltown Arts Centre	Sydney	Australia
2006	There Goes the Neighbourhood	Group	Ambleside Street Studio	Brisbane	Australia
2006	Colonial to Contemporary	Group	Dell Gallery	Brisbane	Australia
2006	The Sixth Drawing Biennale	Group	Drill Hall Gallery, ANU	Canberra	Australia
2006	MCA Collection: New Acquisitions 2006	Group	Museum of Contemporary Art	Sydney	Australia
2006	Radical Regionalism: The Empire of Shadows	Group	Museum of London	London	United Kingdom
2006	Radical Regionalism: The Empire of Shadows	Group	(unmentioned)	Ontario	Canada
2006	Queensland Live	Group (tour)	Queensland Art Gallery	Brisbane	Australia
2006	Queensland Live	Group (tour)	(unmentioned)	Gladstone, Qld	Australia
2006	Queensland Live	Group (tour)	(unmentioned)	Logan, Vic.	Australia
2006	Queensland Live	Group (tour)	(unmentioned)	Bundaberg	Australia
2006	Queensland Live	Group (tour)	(unmentioned)	Cairns	Australia
2006	Queensland Live	Group (tour)	(unmentioned)	Ipswich, Qld	Australia
2006	Queensland Live	Group (tour)	(unmentioned)	Cleveland, Qld	Australia
2006	Queensland Live	Group (tour)	(unmentioned)	Mackay, Qld	Australia
2006	Queensland Live	Group (tour)	(unmentioned)	Toowoomba, Qld	Australia
2006	Dancelines	Group	George Adams Gallery, The Arts Centre	Melbourne	Australia
2007	cant chant	Solo	Institute of Modern Art (IMA)	Brisbane	Australia
2007	unwritten	Solo	Bellas Milani Gallery	Brisbane	Australia
2007	conText	Solo (Postgraduate)	Queensland College of Art Gallery	Brisbane	Australia
2007	Drawings	Solo	Brisbane State High School	Brisbane	Australia
2007	Power & Beauty: Indigenous Art Now	Group	Heide Museum of Modern Art	Melbourne	Australia
2007	Regionalisms	Group	University of Queensland Art Museum	Brisbane	Australia
2007	National Indigenous Art Triennial: Culture Warriors	Group	National Gallery of Art	Canberra	Australia
2007	The Amersham Trophy	Group	Ambleside Street Studio, West End	Brisbane	Australia
2007	Sunshine State	Group	Smart State, Campbelltown Arts Centre	Sydney	Australia
2007	Friendly Fire	Group (ProppaNOW)	George Petelin Gallery	Gold Coast, Qld	Australia
2007	Thresholds of Tolerance	Group	School of Art Gallery	Canberra	Australia
2007	Raised by Wolves	Group	Art Gallery of Western Australia	Perth	Australia
2008	belief suspension	Solo	Artspace	Sydney	Australia
2008	borninthisskin	Solo	Milani Gallery	Brisbane	Australia
2008	Revolutions: Forms that Turn	Group	2008 Biennale of Sydney	Sydney	Australia
2008	In the space of elsewhere	Group	Stanley Picker Gallery	London	England
2008	New Millennium	Group	Lismore Regional Gallery	Lismore, NSW	Australia
2008	On Paper	Group	Milani Gallery	Brisbane	Australia
2008	Optimism	Group	Gallery of Modern Art	Brisbane	Australia
2009	Once Removed	Group	53rd Venice Biennale of Art	Venice, Italy	Australia
2009	Terra Nullius: Contemporary Art from Australia	Group	ACC Galerie	Weimar	Germany
2009	I walk the line: new Australian drawing	Group	Museum of Contemporary Art	Sydney	Australia
2009	Avoiding myth and message: Australian artists & the literary world	Group	Museum of Contemporary Art	Sydney	Australia
2010	Tall Man	Solo	Milani Gallery	Brisbane	Australia
2010	Vernon Ah Kee	Solo	City Gallery	Wellington	New Zealand
2010	Waru	Solo	Gallery of Modern Art	Brisbane	Australia
2010	Waru	Solo	Kick Arts, Contemporary Arts	Cairns, Qld	Australia
2010	Blow your house in	Solo	Mackenzie Art Gallery	Regina	Canada
2010	becauseitisbitter	Solo	Milani Gallery	Brisbane	Australia
2010	roundabout.	Group	City Gallery Wellington	Wellington	New Zealand
2010	Basil Sellers Art Prize,	Group	Ian Potter Museum of Art	Melbourne	Australia
2010	National Works on Paper Award	Group	Mornington Peninsula Regional Gallery	Melbourne	Australia
2010	Jus’ Drawn,	Group	Linden Contemporary Arts Centre	Melbourne	Australia
2010	PUTSCH proppaNOW	Group (proppaNOW	Tandanya National Aboriginal Cultural Institute	Adelaide	Australia
2011	Tall Man	Solo	Gertrude Contemporary	Melbourne	Australia
2011	Bad Sign	Solo	Milani Gallery	Brisbane	Australia
2011	Barack Commissions	Group	National Gallery of Victoria	Melbourne	Australia
2011	The Black Sea.	Group	Kickarts Contemporary Arts	Cairns, Qld	Australia
2011	Counting Coup,	Group	Museum of Contemporary Native Art	New Mexico	USA
2011	Evolving Identities: Contemporary Indigenous Art	Group	John Curtin Gallery	Perth, WA	Australia
2011	Erased: Contemporary Australian Drawing	Group (Asialink)	Nanwang Academy of Fine Arts Gallery (NAFA)	(unmentioned)	Singapore
2011	Erased: Contemporary Australian Drawing	Group (Asialink)	PSG Art Gallery, Silpakorn University	Bangkok	Thailand
2011	Erased: Contemporary Australian Drawing	Group (Asialink)	Chiang Mai University Faculty of Fine Art Gallery	Chiang Mai	Thailand
2011	Erased: Contemporary Australian Drawing	Group (Asialink)	Khon Kaen University Art Gallery	Khon Kaen	Thailand
2011	Erased: Contemporary Australian Drawing	Group (Asialink)	National Art School	Sydney	Australia
2011	Ten Years of Contemporary Art: The James Sourris Collection	Group	Gallery of Modern Art	Brisbane	Australia
2012	Hallmarks of the Hungry	Solo	Milani Gallery	Brisbane	Australia
2012	Everything Falls Apart	Group	Artspace	Sydney	Australia
2012	Propositions Part 2	Group	Milani Gallery	Brisbane	Australia
2012	Negotiating this World: Contemporary Australian Art	Group	National Gallery of Victoria	Melbourne	Australia
2012	unDisclosed: 2nd National Indigenous Art Triennial	Group	National Gallery of Australia	Canberra	Australia
2012	The Future’s Not What it Used to Be	Group	Touring Chapter Gallery	Cardiff, Wales	Australia
2012	The Future’s Not What it Used to Be	Group	Newlyn Art Gallery and Exchange	Cornwall	England
2012	Making Change: Celebrating the 40 Years of Australia-China Diplomatic Relations	Group	NAMOC	Beijing	China
2012	Making Change: Celebrating the 40 Years of Australia-China Diplomatic Relations	Group	COFA	Sydney	Australia
	Transforming Tindale	Solo	State Library of Queensland	Brisbane	Queensland
2013	Invasion Paintings	Solo	Milani Gallery	Brisbane	Australia
2013	My Country: I Still Call Australia Home	Group	Gallery of Modern Art	Brisbane	Australia
2013	Voice and Reason	Group	Gallery of Modern Art	Brisbane	Australia
2013	Sakahan: 1st International Quinquennial of New Indigenous Art	Group	National Gallery of Canada	Ottawa	Canada
2013	Shadowlife	Group	Bendigo Art Gallery	Bendigo, Vic.	Australia
2014	Brutalities	Solo	Milani Gallery	Brisbane	Australia
2014	Saltwater Country	Group	Gold Coast City Gallery	Gold Coast, Qld	Australia
2014	Subject to Ruin	Group	Casula Power House	Casula, NSW	Australia
2014	Four Rooms	Group	Adelaide Festival	Adelaide	Australia
2015	Encounters	Group	National Museum of Australia	Canberra	Australia
2015	Propositions Three	Group	Milani Gallery	Brisbane	Australia
2015	When Silence Falls	Group	Art Gallery of New South Wales	Sydney	Australia
2015	Brutal Truths,	Group	Griffith University Art Museum	Brisbane	Australia
2015	The 14th Istanbul Biennial SALTWATER: A Theory of Thought Forms	Group	(multiple venues)	Istanbul	Turkey
2015	GOMA Q	Group	Gallery of Modern Art	Brisbane	Australia
2015	Imaginary Accord	Group	Institute of Modern Art	Brisbane	Australia
2015	Blackout	Group	Sydney College of the Arts	Sydney	Australia
2015	See You at the Barricades	Group	Art Gallery of New South Wales	Sydney	Australia
2016	Sugar Spin: You, me, art and everything	Group	Gallery of Modern Art	Brisbane	Australia
2016	Everywhen: The Eternal Present in Indigenous Art from Australia,	Group	Harvard Art Museums	Cambridge, Massachusetts	USA
2016	With Secrecy and Despatch	Group	Campbelltown Arts Centre	Sydney	Australia
2016	Frontier Imaginaries	Group	Institute of Modern Art and QUT Art Museum	Brisbane	Australia
2016	Black, White & Restive	Group	Newcastle Art Gallery	Newcastle, NSW	Australia
2016	Endless Circulation: Tarrawarra Biennial,	Group	TarraWarra Museum of Art	TarraWarra, Victoria	Australia
2016	Over the Fence	Group	UQ Art Museum	Brisbane	Australia
2016	On the Origin of Art	Group	Museum of Old and New Art	Hobart, Tas.	Australia
2016	Shut Up and Paint	Group	National Gallery of Victoria	Melbourne	Australia
2017	Ode	Solo	Milani Gallery	Brisbane	Australia
2017	Will I Live	Solo	Apartment der Kunst	Munich	Germany
2017	Not a plant or an animal	Solo	National Art School Gallery	Sydney	Australia
2017	A Change Is Gonna Come	Group	National Museum of Australia	Canberra	Australia
2017	Australian Collection	Group	Permanent Hang, Queensland Art Gallery	Brisbane	Australia
2017	BOARD: Surf and Skate Cultures Meet Contemporary Art	Group	Lake Macquarie City Art Gallery	Lake Macquarie, NSW	Australia
2018	Boundary Lines	Group	Griffith University Art Museum	Brisbane	Australia
2018	2018 Adelaide Biennial of Australian Art: Divided Worlds	Group	Art Gallery of South Australia	Adelaide	Australia
2018	Riots: Slow Cancellation of the Future	Group	ifa-Galerie	Berlin	Germany
2018	Playback, Dobell	Group	Australian Drawing Biennial, Art Gallery of NSW	Sydney	Australia
2018	Hunter Red: Corpus	Group	Newcastle Gallery	Newcastle, NSW	Australia
2019	Shadow Light	Group	Milani Gallery	Brisbane	Australia
2019	cantchant	Group	Art Gallery of Alberta	Alberta	Canada
2019	Body Language	Group	National Gallery of Australia	Canberra	Australia
2019	I, Object	Group	Gallery of Modern Art	Brisbane	Australia
2019	Hope Dies Last: Art at the End of Optimism,	Group	Gertrude Contemporary	Melbourne	Australia
2019	Australia. Antipodean Stories	Group	Padiglione D'Arte Contemporanea Milano	Milan	Italy
2020	The Island	Solo	Campbelltown Arts Centre	Sydney	Australia

In 2010 Vernon Ah Kee was interviewed in a digital story and oral history for the State Library of Queensland's James C Sourris AM Collection. In the interview Ah Kee talks to journalist Daniel Browning about his art, his family, the artist group proppaNOW, and being an Aboriginal artist.
