= Cairns Indigenous Art Fair =

Indigenous Australian art fair in Queensland

Cairns Indigenous Art Fair (CIAF, pronounced ki-af) is an arts and cultural event in the northern Australian city of Cairns, that showcases art by Contemporary Indigenous Australian artists. Established in 2009, the art fair is the opening event of the Cairns Festival.

== History ==
Cairns Indigenous Art Fair (CIAF, pronounced KI-AF) was first held from 21 to 23 August 2009 at the Tanks Art Centre in Cairns, exceeding expectation by attracting more than 10,000 people over the three days of the fair. Visitors came from throughout Australia, the United States, Europe, Korea and Japan. Almost one third of visitors to Cairns Indigenous Art Fair in 2009 identified as Aboriginal Australian and/or Torres Strait Islander.

While most of the visitors (an estimated 70 per cent) attended to take advantage of the free cultural programming and to view the art work, the 36 exhibiting organisations sold artwork to a value of more than A$500,000 during the event.

CIAF was established as a strategic initiative of the Queensland Government's A$11.93 million "Backing Indigenous Arts" program, which committed to strengthening the First Nations arts sector of Far North Queensland from production to market. Michael Snelling was the 2009 and 2010 artistic director of CIAF.

Since 2014, CIAF has functioned as a not-for-profit organisation governed by a Board of Directors. In 2024, CIAF contributed over $9 million to the Cairns and Queensland economies.

== Description ==
The fair brings together Indigenous art centres, commercial and public galleries, artist collectives, studios and arts organisations to sell and exhibit the art work of Queensland's recognised and leading emerging Indigenous Australian visual artists.

The art fair is presented by the Queensland Government and is the opening event of Cairns Festival. The three-day event also features an academic symposium, traditional and contemporary dance and music program, artist talks and demonstrations, a children's art station and family art activities. It is the only dedicated Indigenous art market in Australia that exclusively profiles the art work of Queensland born or based Aboriginal and Torres Strait Islander artists. The Art Fair includes both art centres and commercial galleries in a single location.

CIAF adheres to the "Indigenous Australian Art Commercial Code of Conduct".

== Governance and funding ==
As of 2024, Dennis Stokes, a man of the Wardaman, Luritja, and Warramunga peoples of the Northern Territory, and the Wagadagam people of the Torres Strait Islands, is CEO of CIAF. In September 2024 Stokes was appointed a member of First Nations Arts, a newly-established division of the government arts funding body Australia Council focused on Aboriginal and Torres Strait Islander arts, for a term of four years.

As of 2025, CIAF is supported by the Queensland Government through Arts Queensland; Creative Australia; the Australian Government's Indigenous Visual Arts Industry Support program; Cairns Regional Council; Tourism and Events Queensland; and the Tim Fairfax Family Foundation.

== Artists ==
In 2009, Cairns Indigenous Art Fair featured the work of more than 150 Aboriginal and Torres Strait Islander artists born or based in the Australian state of Queensland. Exhibiting artists included Alick Tipoti, Dennis Nona, Billy Missi, Judy Watson, Vernon Ah Kee, Richard Bell, Tony Albert, Joanne Currie Nalingu, Arone Meeks, Gordon Hookey, Ricardo Idagi, George Nona and Sally Gabori. A full listing of artists and exhibitors is available in the Cairns Indigenous Art Fair catalogue for 2009.

Musicians and dancers who took part in Cairns Indigenous Art Fair in 2009 were Christine Anu, King Kadu, Seaman Dan, Will Kepa, the Aurukun Dancers and Songmen, Ariw Poenipan, Kulkal Baba (Blooded Feather) and the Baiwa Dance Company.

In 2015, proppaNOW mounted an exhibition, Dark + Disturbing: Gordon Hookey for proppaNOW. Dark + Disturbing is a curatorial project by artist Vernon Ah Kee.

In 2025, The Cairns Indigenous Art Fair introduces Mark Makers, a new keynote series within its Talks Program. Featuring Archie Moore, Terri Janke, and Sebastian Goldspink, the series highlights influential First Nations leaders in art, law, and culture. Hosted by advocate and artist Jack Wilkie-Jans, Mark Makers aligns with CIAF's 2025 theme, Pay Attention!, fostering critical dialogue on Indigenous knowledge and truth-telling.

== See also ==
- Darwin Aboriginal Art Fair
- Tarnanthi, Adelaide
