= Emory Douglas =

American artist (born 1943)

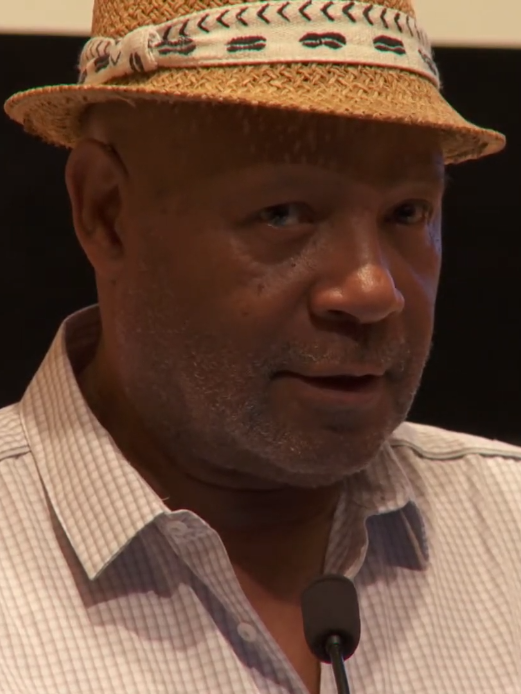
- Douglas in 2017
- Born: May 24, 1943 (age 83); Grand Rapids, Michigan, US
- Known for: Graphic design, painting, collage, drawing
- Movement: Black Power/Black Arts Movement

Emory Douglas (born May 24, 1943) is an American graphic artist. He was a member of the Black Panther Party from 1967 until the Party disbanded in the 1980s. As a revolutionary artist and the Minister of Culture for the Black Panther Party (BPP), Douglas created iconography to represent black-American oppression.

== Early life and education ==
Douglas was born in Grand Rapids, Michigan, and, when he was eight years old, moved to San Francisco, California. At the age of 13, he was sentenced to 15 months at the Youth Training School in Ontario, California, where he worked in the juvenile correctional facility's printing shop and learned the basics of commercial printing.

In 1960, Douglas studied graphic design at the City College of San Francisco. He joined the college's Black Students’ Association and worked closely with Amiri Baraka, a voice in the black arts movement, to design theater sets.

== Career ==
=== Black Panther Party ===
Douglas asked to join the Black Panther Party (BPP) in 1967 after meeting co-founders Huey P. Newton and Bobby Seale at the Black House, a political/cultural center in San Francisco created by author Eldridge Cleaver, playwright Ed Bullins, and Willie Dale.

“I (Douglas) was drawn to it (the Black Panther Party) because of its dedication to self-defense. The Civil Rights Movement headed by Dr. King turned me off at that time, for in those days non-violent protest had no appeal to me. And although the rebellions in Watts, Detroit, and Newark were not well organized they did appeal to my nature. I could identify with them.” —Emory Douglas

When discussing newspaper The Black Panther, formerly known as Black Panther Community News Service, Douglas mentioned to the BPP co-founders that he could help improve the look of the paper.

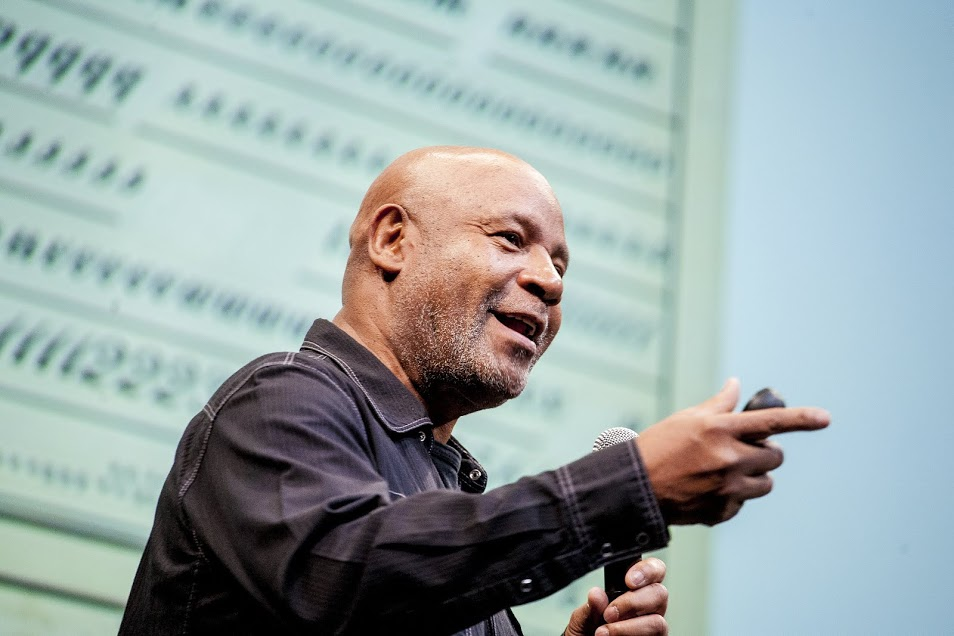
Emory Douglas at Typo San Francisco 2014 presenting his Black Panther newspaper graphic

Douglas became the "Revolutionary Artist" and "Minister of Culture" for the BPP in 1967. He redesigned The Black Panther and switched it to web press, which allowed for colored printing and graphics. Here, Douglas developed iconic images that branded the BPP: the depiction of policemen as bloodied or hanged pigs, as protest against police brutality of African Americans, and imagery in line with the Party's 10-Point program. Douglas illustrated BPP's social services and decent housing. In addition, Douglas aligned the BPP with "Third World liberation struggles" and anti-capitalist movements in the edition of January 3, 1970, which shows an impaled pig dressed in an American flag with guns pointed at it, saying things such as "Get out of the ghetto" and "Get out of Africa". Todd Gitlin criticized Douglas for using what Gitlin saw as antisemitic symbols in the caricatures he published in The Black Panther.

In 1970, Douglas took part in the co-founding of a musical band called The Lumpen, which he was credited with naming. Emory chose the name "The Lumpen" after the Marxist idea of the lumpenproletariat. However, it is also believed that the name was inspired by The Wretched of the Earth by Marxist author Frantz Fanon.

In 1970, the BPP shifted their stance to emphasize survival programs as opposed to violence. With that, Douglas's imagery changed as well, showing African Americans receiving free food and clothes. They promoted free breakfast programs, free health clinics, free legal aid, amongst other things. These programs were considered part of their revolutionary tactic. In response, the FBI cracked down on the cause even more, until it inevitably brought it to an end in 1982. However, their ideology is still alive today.

In 2007, the San Francisco Chronicle reporter Jessica Werner Zack wrote that "he branded the militant-chic Panther image decades before the concept became commonplace. He used the newspaper's popularity (circulation neared 400,000 at its peak in 1970) to incite the disenfranchised to action, portraying the poor with genuine empathy, not as victims but as outraged, unapologetic and ready for a fight."

In addition to the paper, Douglas designed postcards, event flyers, and posters that were meant as recruitment tactics as well as a method of spreading the BPP ideology and creating the impression that there was mass support of the cause. Douglas recalled: "After a while it flashed on me that you have to draw in a way that even a child can understand to reach your broadest audience without losing the substance or insight of what is represented." (Stewart, 2011).

=== Later activism ===
Douglas drew a lot of inspiration from Third World struggles and used art as the primary method of propaganda and outreach. His graphics served to promote the Party's ideologies, which were inspired by the rhetoric of revolutionary figures such as Malcolm X and Che Guevara. His images were often very graphic, meant to promote and empower black resistance with the hope of starting a revolution to end institutionalized mistreatment of African Americans.

Douglas worked at the black community-oriented San Francisco Sun-Reporter newspaper for more than 30 years after The Black Panther newspaper was no longer published. He continued to create activist artwork, and his artwork stayed relevant, according to Greg Morozumi, artistic director of EastSide Arts Alliance in Oakland, California: "Rather than reinforcing the cultural dead end of 'post-modern' nostalgia, the inspiration of his art raises the possibility of rebellion and the creation of new revolutionary culture."

In 2006, artist and curator Sam Durant edited a comprehensive monograph on the work of Douglas, Black Panther: The Revolutionary Art of Emory Douglas, with contributors including Danny Glover, Kathleen Cleaver, St. Clair Bourne, Colette Gaiter (Professor at the University of Delaware), Greg Morozumi, and Sonia Sanchez.

After the monograph's publication, Douglas had retrospective exhibitions at the Museum of Contemporary Art, Los Angeles (2007–08) and the New Museum in New York. Since the re-introduction of his early work to new audiences, he continues to make new work, exhibit and interact with audiences in formal and informal settings all over the world. His international exhibitions and visits include Urbis, Manchester (2008); Auckland, a collaboration with Richard Bell in Brisbane (2011); Chiapas; and Lisbon (2011).

Colette Gaiter writes:

Douglas was the most prolific and persistent graphic agitator in the American Black Power movements. Douglas profoundly understood the power of images in communicating ideas ... Inexpensive printing technologies—including photostats and press-type, textures and patterns—made publishing a two-color heavily illustrated, weekly tabloid newspaper possible. Graphics production values associated with seductive advertising and waste in a decadent society became weapons of the revolution. Technically, Douglas collaged and re-collaged drawings and photographs, performing graphics tricks with little budget and even less time. His distinctive illustration style featured thick black outlines (easier to trap) and resourceful tint and texture combinations. Conceptually, Douglas's images served two purposes: first, illustrating conditions that made revolution seem necessary; and second, constructing a visual mythology of power for people who felt powerless and victimized. Most popular media represents middle to upper-class people as "normal." Douglas was the Norman Rockwell of the ghetto, concentrating on the poor and oppressed. Departing from the WPA/social realist style of portraying poor people, which can be perceived as voyeuristic and patronizing, Douglas's energetic drawings showed respect and affection. He maintained poor people's dignity while graphically illustrating harsh situations.

Douglas is now retired but does freelance design work discussing topics such as Black on Black Crime and the prison industrial complex. His more current works features children. He feels he must continue to educate through his work.

Douglas's work was included in the 2025 exhibition Photography and the Black Arts Movement, 1955–1985 at the National Gallery of Art.

=== Collaborations ===
- EDELO (En Donde Era La Onu): At Chiapas, Mexico, a collection of embroideries called EDELO, in English: Where the United Nations Used to Be, was a collaboration with Douglas, the Woman’s Zapatista Embroidery Collective, and Caleb Duarte.
- 2011–14, Peace heals, war kills (Bis ass mutha fuckin mural): With Australian Indigenous artist Richard Bell.
- 2014, We Can Be Heroes: With Australian Indigenous artist Richard Bell, both artists merged their experience of the Indigenous rights movements of Australia with the Black Power movement of America. The collaboration resulted in a work that is set after the 1968 Summer Olympics medal ceremony for track and field. Australian Peter Norman stands in solidarity with African Americans Tommie Smith and John Carlos .
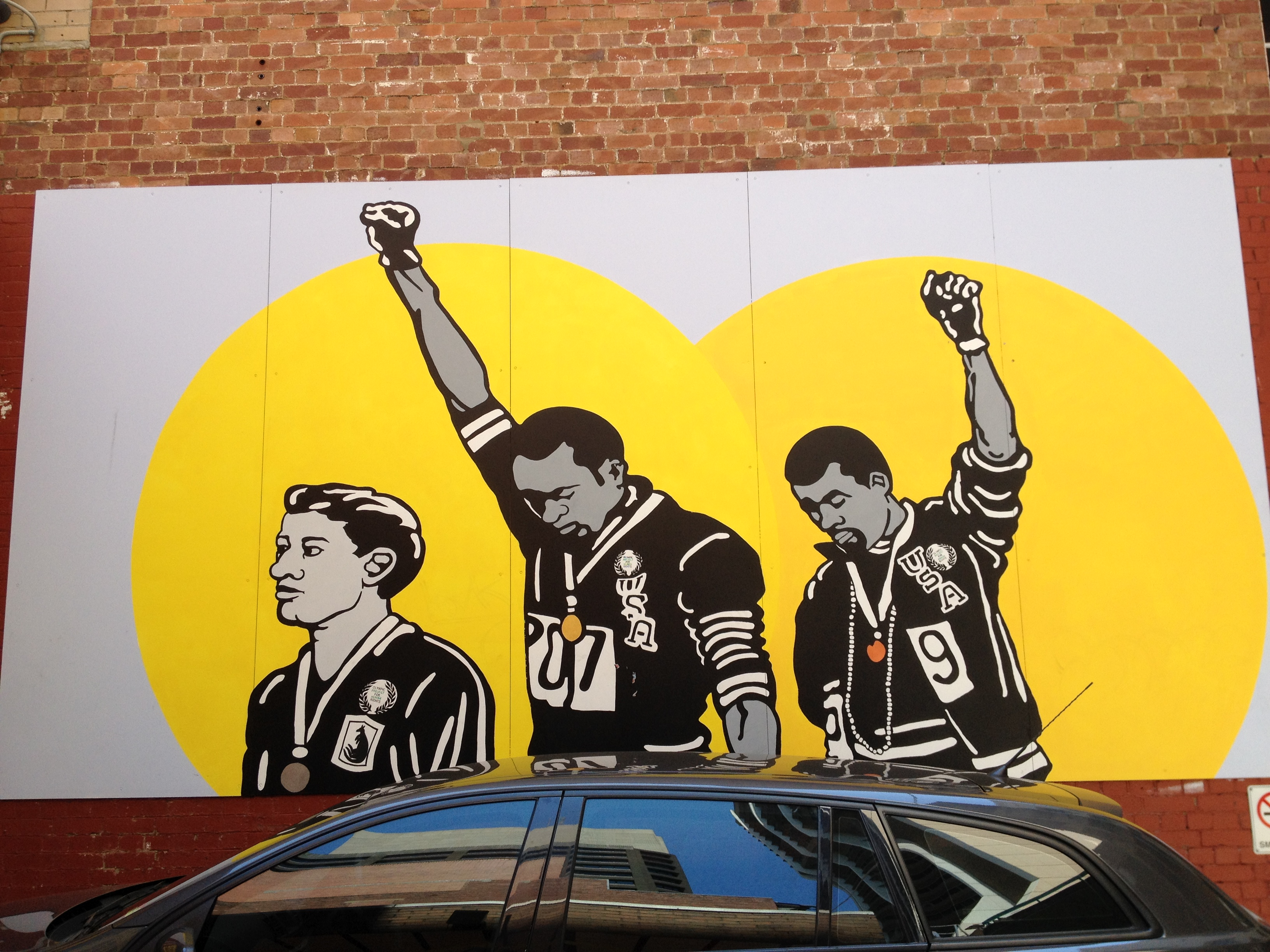
  A mural recreation of Douglas and Bell's "We Can Be Heroes" located in Brisbane, Australia commemorating the 1968 Olympics Black Power salute.
- 2018, Black Lives Matter Global Network with Frieze NY for an art fair that showcased We Shall Survive Without A Doubt, a work of Douglas that can be seen on the back cover of The Black Panther, Issue #30.
- 2020, Da 5 Bloods : With the award-winning filmmaker Spike Lee, Douglas adapted his anti-Viet-Nam war graphic that was in The Black Panther newspaper for Lee's film Da 5 Bloods.

=== Exhibitions ===
- 2007–08, Museum of Contemporary Art, Los Angeles; Black Panther: The Revolutionary Art of Emory Douglas.
- 2008, Station Museum of Contemporary Art, DEFENDING DEMOCRACY.
- 2008–09, Urbis, Black Panther: Emory Douglas and the art of revolution.
- 2009: The New Museum, Emory Douglas: Black Panther.
- 2016–17, Urban Justice Center, We Have Nothing to Lose but Our Chains.
- 2016–17, Oakland Museum of California, All Power to the People: Black Panthers at 50.
- 2017, Tate Modern, Soul of a Nation: Art in the Age of Black Power.
- 2018, Los Angeles Contemporary Exhibitions, Emory Douglas: Bold Visual Language.
- 2018, Denison Museum at Denison University, Emory Douglas: Revolutionary Artist of the Black Panthers.
- 2021, Storage Art Gallery, Tribeca curated by Onyedika Chuke, Storage_.

== Awards ==
- 2015, AIGA Medal.
- 2019, San Francisco Art Institute 's Honorary Doctor of Fine Arts.

== Art commentary ==
=== Exhibitions ===
- Art Papers Magazine; March/April 2014, Vol. 38, Issue 2, p. 53. "Works Exhibited: Emory Douglas". Carrie Meyer.
- Zoot Magazine. April 28, 2011. "ALL POWER TO THE PEOPLE – ENTÃO E AGORA": GALERIA ZÉ DOS BOIS, Lisbon.
- Green Left Weekly; October 14, 2009, Issue 813, p. 4. "Black Panther artist launches exhibition." The article reviews the exhibition All Power to the People, by Emory Douglas at the Milani Gallery in Brisbane, Queensland. Paul Benedek.
- Bomb; Fall 2009, Issue 109, p. 12. Emory Douglas: Black Panther exhibition New Museum, New York City. David Kramer.
- Art Newspaper; July/August 2009, Vol. 18, Issue 204, p. 58. Emory Douglas: Black Panther exhibition New Museum, New York City. Helen Stoilas.
- Museums Journal (2009), Issue 109/3, 44–47. March. Black Panther: Emory Douglas and the Art of Revolution, Urbis, Manchester.
- Art in America; June/July 2008, Vol. 96, Issue 6, p. 106. "The Revolution Will Be Visualized." The article reviews the exhibition Black Panther: The Revolutionary Art of Emory Douglas, featuring the work of artist Emory Douglas at the Museum of Contemporary Art's (L.A. MOCA) Pacific Design Center in Los Angeles, California, from October 21, 2007, to February 24, 2008. Sarah Valdez.

=== Publications ===
- Revue de Recherche en civilization américaine. 2 | 2010. Sabrina Sérac, "2: 2010: La culture Populaire américaine" (review of Black Panther: The Revolutionary Art of Emory Douglas), June 30, 2010, accessed March 28, 2014.
- Creative Review; May 2007, Vol. 27, Issue 5, p. 21. " Art and The Man." Carrie Meyer review of Black Panther: The Revolutionary Art of Emory Douglas.
- Library Journal; April 1, 2007, Vol. 132, Issue 6, p. 87. Edward K. Owusu-Ansah review of Black Panther: The Revolutionary Art of Emory Douglas.
- New Statesman; July 23, 2007, Vol. 136, Issue 4854, p. 59. In this article, the author discusses three books which constitute, in his opinion, significant examples of outsider art. The books in question are Mingering Mike: The Amazing Career of an Imaginary Soul Superstar, by Dori Hadar, Black Panther: The Revolutionary Art of Emory Douglas and "Gravity's Rainbow Illustrated," by Zak Smith.

=== Videos ===
- "Black Panther: Emory Douglas and the Art of Revolution" on YouTube. Uploaded on March 26, 2009.

The first exhibition by the campaigning US artist Emory Douglas in the UK, pays tribute to an unsung hero of the modern civil rights movement.

- "Emory Douglas: The Art of The Black Panthers"
- Emory Douglas Public Critique (Part I) and Emory Douglas Public Critique (Part II)

In 2017, the Rhode Island School of Design's Global Initiative (GI) invited Emory Douglas to critique selected student pieces to collectively engage with identity based artwork.
