= The Lumpen =

- Also known as: The Freedom Messengers Revolutionary Musicians
- Origin: San Francisco
- Genres: Funk, R&B, folk music
- Instruments: Guitars, pianos
- Years active: 1970 - 1972
- Past members: Bill Calhoun; Clark (Santa Rita) Bailey; Saturu Ned (aka James Mott); Michael (Mark) Torrance

The Lumpen was a musical band created by members of the Black Panther Party (BPP) to promote the party's political messages and activities. They were active in creating political music and social commentary for the BPP, including songs calling for the freeing of black political prisoners in the US and music in support of the party's community aid programs.

During their short career, The Lumpen collaborated with Muhammad Ali and Curtis Mayfield on a prison concert, as well as being on friendly terms with popular R&B bands of the time including The Dells and The Stylistics, both of which were fans of The Lumpen.

== Origin ==
The exact details of the origin of The Lumpen as a band are unclear. The original members of the band were all Black Panther Party members who met each other doing work for the party in San Francisco, some of whom had played music with each other in the past. The skill levels varied greatly from church choirs to professional careers in the music industry.

The Black Panther Party's minister of culture, Emory Douglas, suggested to the founding members that they start the band. Emory chose the name "The Lumpen" after the Marxist idea of the lumpenproletariat. However, it is also believed that the name chosen for The Lumpen was inspired by The Wretched of the Earth by Marxist author Frantz Fanon. From its foundation, The Lumpen worked directly for the Black Panther Party's Ministry of Culture, directly under Emory Douglass and June Hilliard, with the latter being both very critical yet supportive of The Lumpen. The Lumpen began their rehearsals at the Black Panther Party HQ in West Oakland.

=== Cultural context ===
Contextually The Lumpen was shaped by the influence of James Brown's song Say It Loud – I'm Black and I'm Proud that laid the groundwork for songs on the black experience which crossed the racial divide. According to music historian Rickey Vincent:

"The explicit use of race—all that sort of evolved from late '69 into '70. This new era of music was driven by a tantalizing mix of racial community and racial confrontation. The way the times were changing, the way people's expectations were changing, somebody had to push that a little further."

== Activity and performances ==
The band recruited background musicians with left-wing politics, and began putting on live shows complete with uniforms and choreography. The band was especially active in the San Francisco Bay Area, performing in community centers, clubs, political rallies, and colleges. As the band's music was intended for education and promotion of the Black Panther Party, the band's members were made to intensely study history and politics.

The Lumpen also put on shows for the Temple of the Son of Man, which was a non-denominational spiritual center run by the Black Panther Party.

=== San Quentin prison concert ===
One of the highlights of The Lumpen's career was a concert in San Quentin prison with Muhammad Ali and Curtis Mayfield which was organised by journalist Belva Davis. The Lumpen began their concert with their version of Curtis Mayfield's song "People Get Ready", before moving onto The Lumpen's song "Free Bobby Now" and "Ol' Pig Nixon". However, during the fourth song, "Revolution is the Only Solution" the prison guards ended the concert after taking note of the lyrics.

The Lumpen band member Saturu Ned recalled the moment the prison guards stopped the concert:

"All of a sudden, the mics went dead. The guards had pulled the plug. They cut our mic and said, 'You're not gonna sing anymore, or we're gonna end this concert and we're gonna send the prisoners back.' So Curtis came out, and Muhammad Ali was back there just busting up. 'They didn't let y'all sing, huh? Well, I guess I'm gonna have to get out there and tell the truth anyway.' I never will forget that."

=== 1971 East Coast tour ===
The band began a tour of the East Coast of the United States with Emory Douglas in late 1971, beginning with a "kick-off concert" at Merritt College with a packed audience. The Lumpen played at both fundraisers and colleges in Minneapolis–Saint Paul, New York City, Boston, New Haven, and the Revolutionary People's Constitutional Convention. During their 1971 East Coast tour, The Lumpen played near a prison in New Haven where black political prisoner Bobby Seale was being imprisoned. They played to an angry and threatening crowd. Band member Saturu Ned recalls the incident:

"They threatened us in New Haven, [but] we said, 'Oh, well. We might not get another opportunity to consistently say this.'"

A live recording of the tour was made; however the album was never released and the master tapes were lost.

== Later work and disbandment ==
After returning to Oakland from their 1971 East Coast tour, The Lumpen began performing throughout California. Attempts to get an airplay for "Lumpen Live" were unsuccessful as the song's lyrics were deemed to be too controversial. It was not unusual for American radio stations to refuse to play The Lumpen's music.

In 1972 The Lumpen disbanded due to departing members and shifting priorities in the Black Panther Party. The core members continued to work for the Black Panther Party after The Lumpen was disbanded.

== Music ==
The band's first song was "No More" written by Bill Calhoun, who later wrote another song of protest calling for the release of Bobby Seale called "Bobby Must Be Set Free".

Many of the Band's songs were parodies of popular songs by bands such as The Impressions and The Temptations.

== Legacy and influence ==
Though the career of The Lumpen was short-lived, they greatly influenced political music in the United States during the 1970s, and later bands such as The Coup, Dead Prez, and Public Enemy.

In 2013 music historian Rickey Vincent released a book on The Lumpen titled Party Music: The Inside Story of the Black Panthers Band and How Black Power Transformed Soul Music. The book was given a glowing review by the Black Panther Party's former Minister of Culture, Emory Douglas. The foreword was written by Boots Riley.

== Songs ==
- No More
- Bobby Must be Set Free (Free Bobby)
- Ol' Pig Nixon
- Revolution's Come
- Revolution is the Only Solution
- We Can't Wait Another Day
- Set Sister Erika Free
