= Frances Wildt Pavlu =

- Died: 2016
- Education: Royal Melbourne Institute of Art, Sir John Cass, London.
- Known for: Contemporary Art Jewellery
- Movement: Contemporary Jewellery

Frances Wildt Pavlu, also known as Frances Pavlu and Hilda Pavlu, was a contemporary art jeweller and educator.

== Early life and education ==
Born in the country formerly known as Czechoslovakia, migrated to Australia.

Frances Wildt Pavlu was educated at Royal Melbourne Institute of Technology, receiving a Diploma of Gold and Silversmithing, in 1975. In 1976, she gained a Crafts Certificate in Jewellery from Sir John Cass School of Art Institute. She also attended courses and worked in Pforzheim, West Germany and at Georg Jensen A/S in Copenhagen, Denmark.

== Career ==
Frances Wildt Pavlu's jewellery was noted for its sculptural forms. She exhibited regularly in group and solo exhibitions. In 1971, she was a founding member of the Queensland Jewellery Workshop along with Kit Shannon, Jane Shannon, Merv Muhling and Don Ross. She was a lecturer at Queensland College of Art in the Gold and Silversmithing Department where she worked with Lyle Tweeddale, Maurice Maunsell and Jorgen de Voss.

=== Major exhibitions ===
- 1975 Sculpture in Plastic and Silver, group exhibition, Fantasia Galleries at the Hibiscus Function Centre, Jamison, Canberra, Australia.
- 1974 Solo Exhibition, Design Arts Centre, Brisbane, Australia.
- 1972 Solo exhibition, Design Arts Centre, Brisbane, Australia.
- 1972 First International Handicrafts Exhibition in Colombia.
- 1970 Solo exhibition, Design Arts Centre, Brisbane, Australia.
- 1970 Exhibited a collection of jewellery at the office of the Minister (Commercial) Australian Embassy, Tokyo, Japan.
- 1970 Exhibited in the Australian Pavilion at Expo '70, Osaka, Japan.
- 1968 Solo exhibition, Exhibition at Design Arts Centre, Brisbane, Australia.

=== Public collections ===
- Queensland Art Gallery Ring: Enigma key - a tautological paradox, 1980.
- Casa de la Cultura de Narino, Colombia, 1972.

=== Awards and nominations ===
- 1972 First prize in the jewellery section of the Westfield Art Prize
- 1972 Awarded one of two international equal prizes of the First International Handicrafts Exhibition, Colombia.
- 1971 First and Second prize, Jewellery Section, Royal National Association, Brisbane, Australia.
- 1968 Benvenuto Cellini Prize, Document of Honour, Munich.
