= Yininmadyemi - Thou didst let fall =

Sculpture in Hyde Park, Sydney, Australia

'Yininmadyemi' - Thou didst let fall
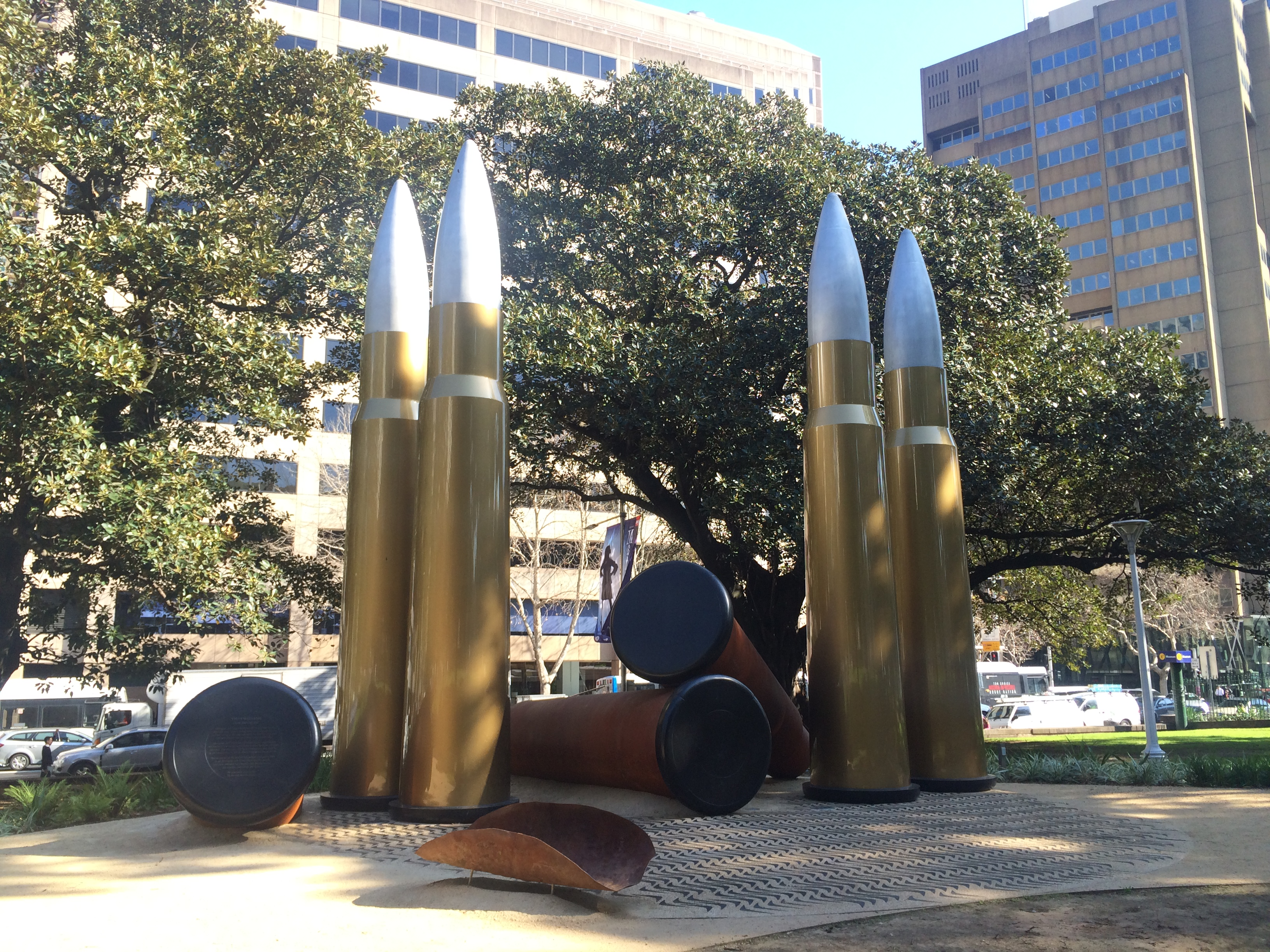
- Artist: Tony Albert
- Year: 2015
- Type: Sculpture
- Location: Hyde Park, Sydney, Australia; 33°52′30.7″S 151°12′35.9″E

Yininmadyemi - Thou didst let fall is a sculptural artwork by Indigenous Australian artist Tony Albert located in Hyde Park, Sydney. Unveiled on 31 March 2015, the artwork acknowledges the service of Aboriginal and Torres Strait Islander men and women in the Australian Defence Force.

== Title ==
The word Yininmadyemi is taken from an indigenous language of Sydney and translates as 'Thou Didst Let Fall'. The translation is sourced from the writings of Second Lieutenant William Dawes who recorded the local language and culture of the Aboriginal people of Sydney in the late 18th century. The sculpture's title is an example of poetic metonymy and is used to enhance the artwork's commemorative purpose.

== Design ==
Yininmadyemi - Thou didst let fall is composed of four seven-metre tall bullets made of painted aluminium, black marble and Corten steel standing beside three fallen shell casings. The bullets and shell casings are arranged upon a crushed granite base that is in the shape of a boomerang. Albert's design for this sculptural memorial is inspired by international memorials such as the Memorial to the Murdered Jews of Europe in Berlin.

=== Artistic themes and symbolism ===
The bullets featured in the artwork are modelled on the .303 round, the 'standard small-arms ammunition used by the Australian military in the First and Second World Wars as well as the Korean War'. Albert chose to use the bullet in his design as a universal symbol for conflict and a metaphor for human existence. The arrangement of bullets and shell casings sit atop a boomerang shaped base. The shape of the base recalls the boomerangs that were given by some families to soldiers who left for war as a symbol of hope for their safe return.

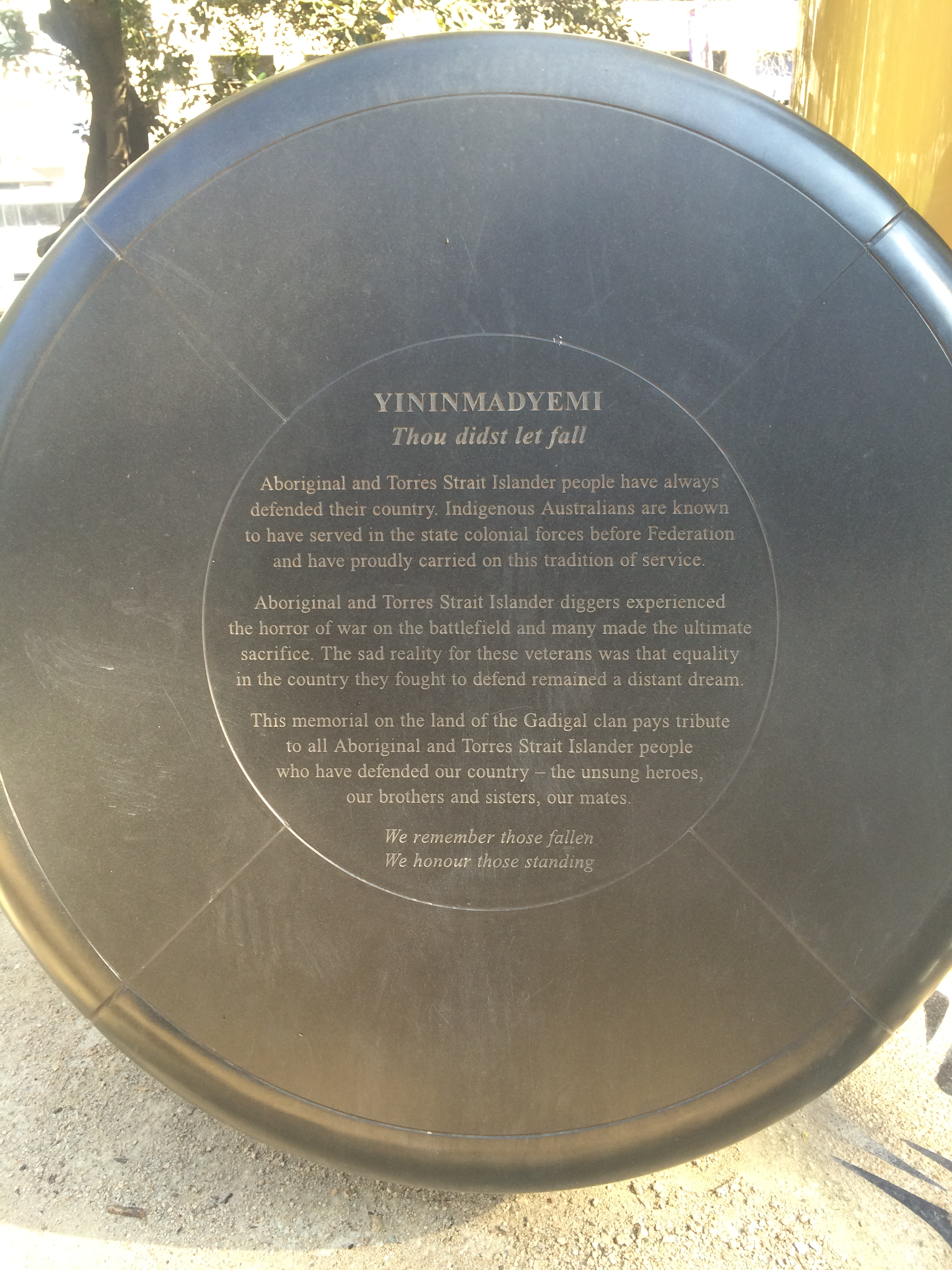
Inscription on fallen shell casing

=== Inscription ===
The base of one of the fallen shell casings features an inscription that was written by Albert in collaboration with Indigenous Australian author Anita Heiss. The inscription honours the Aboriginal and Torres Strait Islander servicemen and women who have served in nearly every conflict and peace keeping mission that Australia has participated in since the beginning of the twentieth century. The text also acknowledges the racial discrimination experienced by many Indigenous veterans, whose service was not adequately recognised for many decades.

=== Personal inspiration ===
The design of Yininmadyemi - Thou Didst Let Fall is a symbolic reflection upon the war experience of Albert's grandfather, Eddie Albert, an indigenous soldier who served in the Australian Military in World War Two. During his World War II service, Eddie was captured as a prisoner of war following battle in Libya. The story of Eddie's escape from an Italian POW camp, consequent recapture and survival after three of his fellow Allied soldiers were executed is expressed by the three fallen shells of the sculpture.

== Design competition ==
The artwork was commissioned by the City of Sydney as part of the municipal government's Eora Journey program, which aims to recognise and celebrate the ongoing significance of Aboriginal and Torres Strait Islander culture and history in the public domain, curated by Hetti Perkins. Albert's design, produced in conjunction with Cracknell & Longeran Architects Pty Ltd, was selected from 14 submissions by Aboriginal and Torres Strait Islander artists. The submissions were assessed by a panel of representatives from the City's Aboriginal and Torres Strait Islander and Design Advisory panels, the Eora Journey Public Art Working Group, the Art Gallery of NSW and the Australian War Memorial.

== Location ==
The artwork is located in Hyde Park South beside the ANZAC War Memorial, which has served as a major commemorative site since 1934. The location was also chosen due to its status and historical significance for the Gadigal people, one of the clans of the Eora Nation. The site of the artwork has further historical significance as the area was once a 'ritual contest ground, a crossroads for traditional walking trails and an important site for Aboriginal ceremony, gathering and camping'.

== Construction ==
The head contractor for the artwork's construction was Cracknell & Longeran Architects Pty Ltd. Hargraves Urban also contributed to the construction of the project.

Yininmadyemi design details
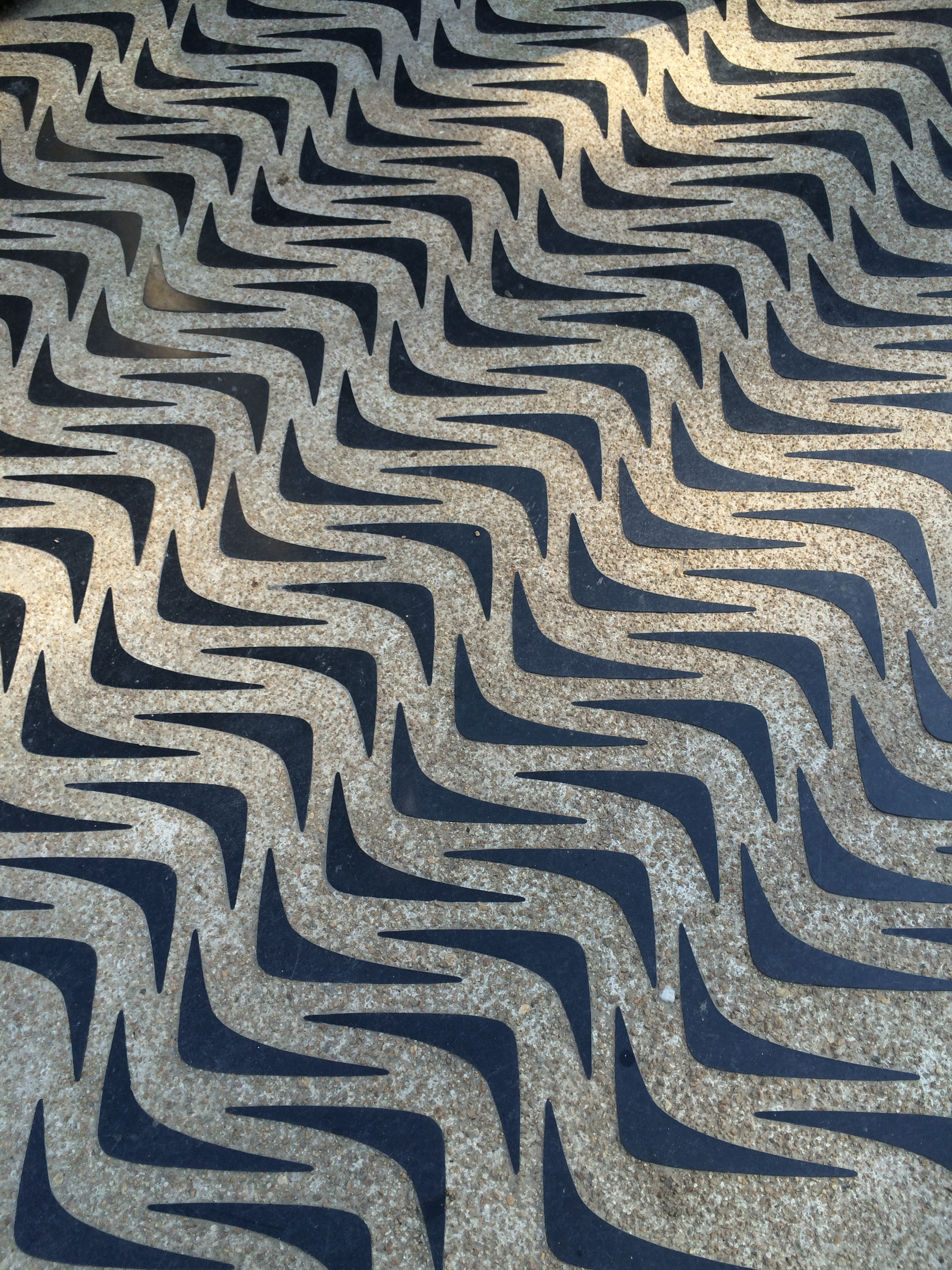
Black marble detail on the artwork's crushed granite base

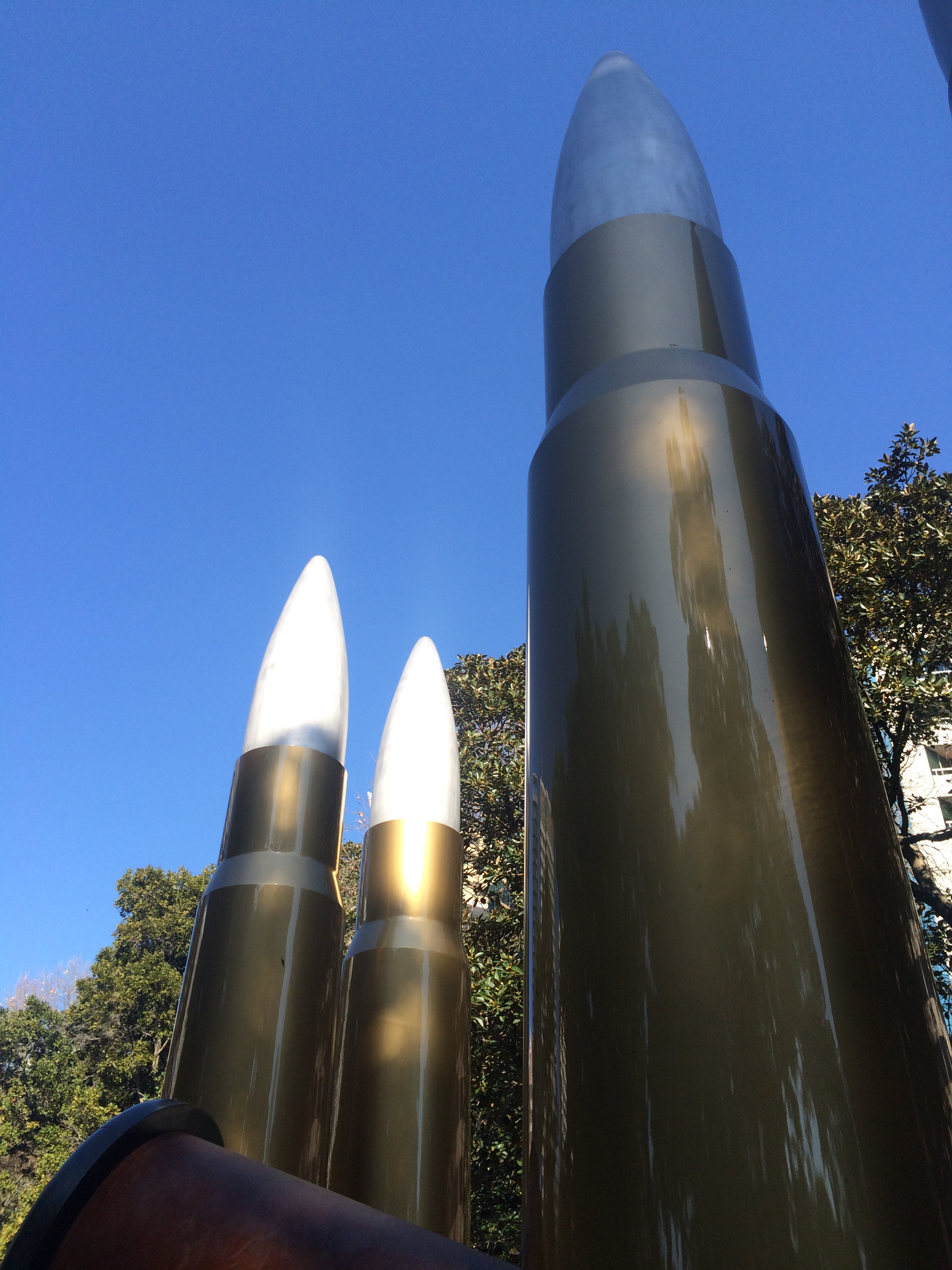
Three of the artwork's four standing bullets

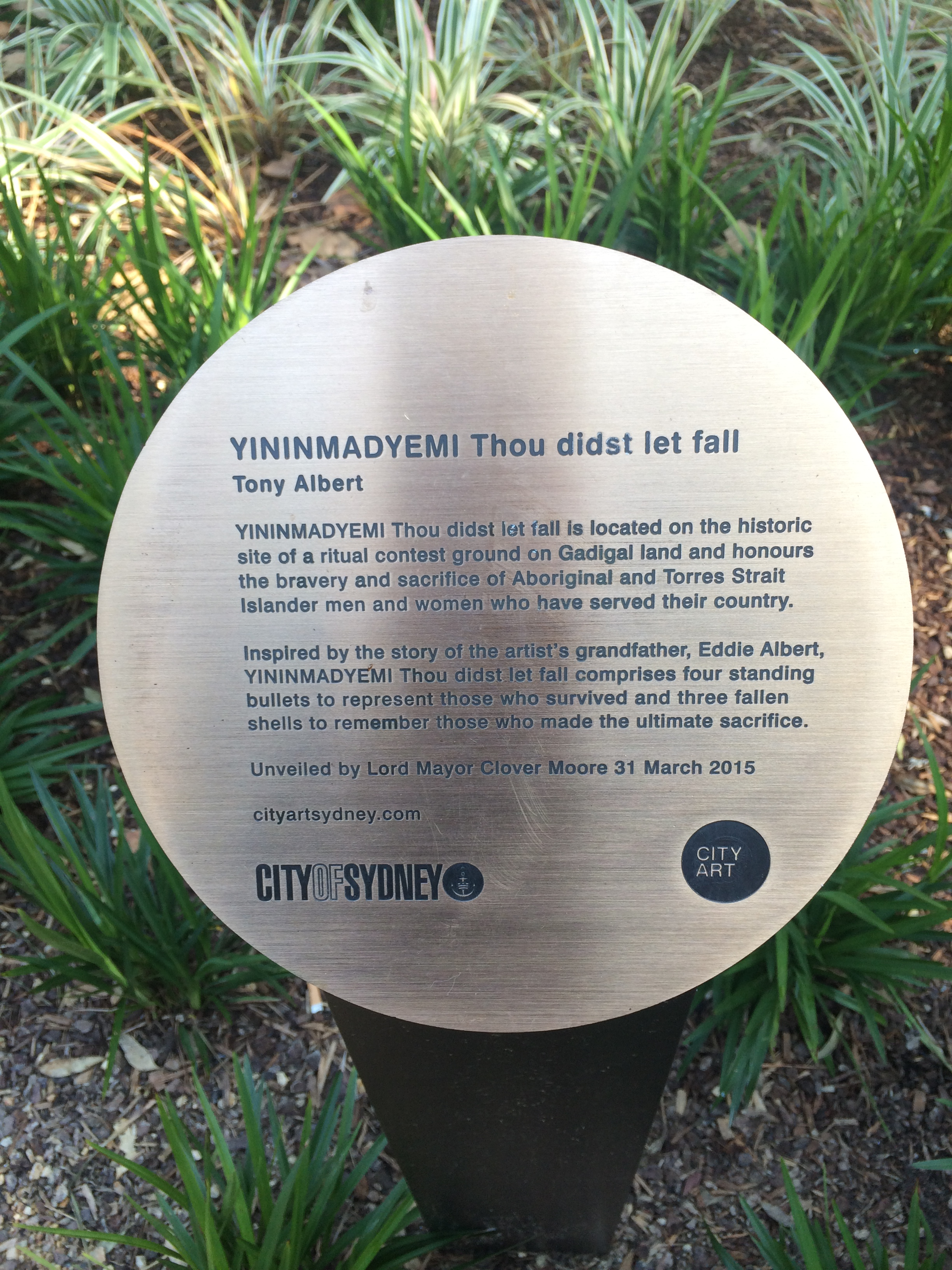
Dedication plaque from the City of Sydney

== Critical responses ==
Although the work itself uses the word "memorial", it is variously described as "public art work, "dramatic sculpture" and "memorial art work". The inherent tension between memorial and artwork has been noted, as has the fact that while some people found it "heavy-handed", others appreciated its "refreshing" acknowledgement of the horrors of war.

== See also ==
- List of public art in the city of Sydney
