= Caleb Duarte =

American artist

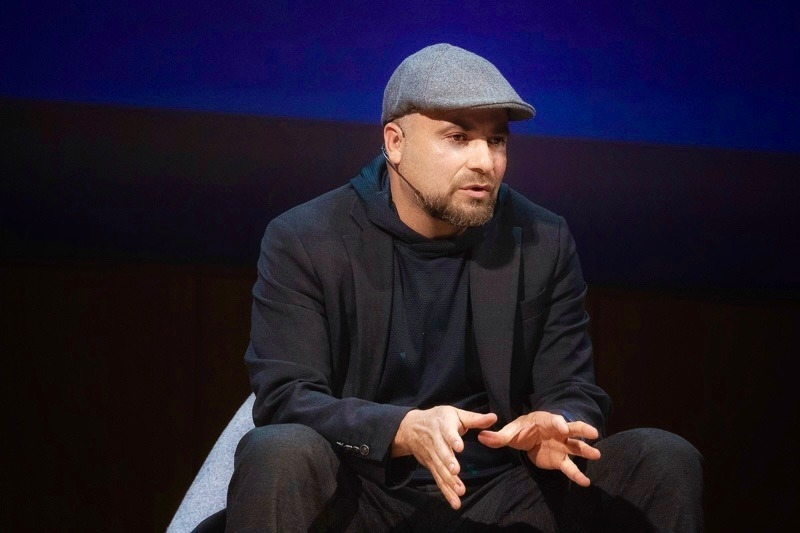
- Born: Caleb Duarte Piñon
- Education: School of the Art Institute of Chicago
- Website: www.calebduarte.org

Caleb Duarte Piñon (ka-leb) is an American multidisciplinary artist who works with construction type materials, site-specific community performance, painting, and social sculpture and social practices.

== Early life and education ==
Caleb Duarte was born in the border town of El Paso, Texas where his family lived in Juarez, Mexico. At the age of four, Duarte and his family migrated from Nogales, Sonora to the farming community of Corcoran of California. He is one of four boys born to Francisco Duarte and Soledad Duarte Piñon. Siblings are Samuel Hiram Duarte, Josue Duarte, and David Duarte.

After graduating high school in 1996, Duarte worked odd jobs as a window cleaner, roofing, pools and in construction, laying drywall in new homes in the suburbs of Fresno CA, while taking painting courses at Fresno City College; His early years in construction would later inform his work as he discovered the fragility of the materials used to create suburban homes. In 2000, Duarte was accepted to the undergraduate program in painting at the San Francisco Art Institute.

Duarte returned to the United States and attended the Graduate Sculpture department of the School of The Art Institute of Chicago where he studied under Mary Jane Jacob, Laurie Palmer and Drea Howenstein. Duarte holds a Bachelors of Fine Arts, Painting (2003) from San Francisco Art Institute, and a Masters of Fine Arts, Sculpture (2009) from School of the Art Institute of Chicago, Chicago Illinois USA.

== Career ==
After grad school, 2009, Duarte moved to Chiapas Mexico to learn closely from the Zapatista movement and other artivism movements of Latin America. Duarte invited collaborator artist Mia Eve Rollow to co-found and direct EDELO, an international experimental artist residency and cultural hub of diverse practices. EDELO (Spanish acronym for 'Where the United Nations Used To Be') in San Cristobal de Las Casas, Chiapas Mexico. Notable residents include Emory Douglas; former Minister of Culture for the Black Panther Party, muralist Rigo 23, Favianna Rodriguez, Rupa Marya, and scholars such as Ramesh Srinivasan. Other notable participants in exhibiting artist and performances include Regina Galindo, Manuel Ocampo with Juan Carlos Quintana, Lisl Ponger. Performing artist include hip hop artist Olmeca, Manik B, and Climbing Poetree, Roco from Maldita Vecindad, Lengualerta.

Duarte has spoken on this work at the 2012 Creative Time Summit in New York City, the Otis School of Art and Design - San Francisco State University, The De Young Museum San Francisco, East Side Arts Alliance in Oakland, and the REDCAT Gallery in Los Angeles California, University of New Mexico, Yerba Buena Center for the Arts, UC Santa Cruz, Fresno State University, amongst many others.

Duarte teaches sculpture at Fresno City College and is artist-in-residence at the Institute of Arts & Science - UC Santa Cruz.

In 2023, Duarte was appointed by Governor Gavin Newsom to serve a four year term as a member of the California Arts Council. Duarte was part of the Oakland Arts Commission appointed by then Mayor Jerry Brown in 2006.

Duarte installed a permanent mixed-media mosaic mural titled “We Have Arrived” in 2025 at Fresno Yosemite International Airport. The mural consists of a painted ceramic central figure, inspired by Afro-Indigenous and Latinx futurisms, representing a growing abstract tree with well-grounded roots, reflecting the region’s surrounding mountains and forests.

== Exhibitions ==
Caleb Duarte has presented his work at numerous institutions, including Yerba Buena Center for the Arts, SF, Red Dot Art Fair in NY, The Sullivan Galleries in Chicago, Jack Fisher Gallery in SF, Gallery 727 Los Angeles, The Oakland Museum of California, the Fresno Art Museum and The Utah Museum of Contemporary Art, Bay Area Now 8, and many others. In addition, Duarte has created public works and community performances at the World Social Forum in Mumbai, India, Santiago de Cuba, Cuba, El Pital Honduras, Mexico City, and throughout the US.

=== TinyBe ===
In 2021, Duarte and Mia Eve Rollow were invited as EDELO to create a livable Sculpture in Frankfurt Germany along with eight other international artists. Duarte and Rollow decided to work with local Syrian and Iranian artists seeking asylum. Mina Afshar-Saheb-Ekhtiari, Khaled Al Salamh, The sculpture was known as The Embassy of the Refugee, addressing issues of global and forced migration, cheap labor, invisible labor, climate justice and the shipment of goods. They constructed a wooden shipping crate housed by a tent and surrounded by a golden scaffold where informal sculptural performances were created.

=== Zapantera Negra ===
As the lead facilitator for Zapantera Negra project, Duarte collaborated with Rigo 23 and Mia Eve Rollow; Saul Mendez Kack, Lorena Rodiriguez, bringing in artist and once Minister of Culture for the Black Panther Party, Emory Douglas to work with the Zapatista. This project united Zapatistas with Black Panther esthetics to investigate the use of the body and visual communication in both distinct political and artistic movements.

Zapantera Negra was included in the traveling exhibition “Giro Grafico” at the Reina Sofia Museum curated by collective Red Conceptualism del Sur.

== Distinctions ==
- Recipient of the Creative Capital Award - 2019
- 2023 Chamberlain award Headlands Center for the Arts.
