= Carol McGregor =

Indigenous Australian artist

- Born: 1961 (age 64–65)
- Education: Queensland College of Art, Griffith University
- Known for: Installation
- Movement: Contemporary Australian Art
- Website: http://www.carolmcgregor.com.au

External videos
- “Art of the Skins“, State Library of Queensland
- “Digital story with Carol McGregor”, Art of the Skins exhibition, kuril dhagun (State Library Of Queensland), 2016

Carol McGregor is an Indigenous Australian artist of Wathaurung (Victoria) and Scottish descent, internationally known for her multi media installation pieces bringing together ephemeral natural fibres, metal, and paper. She is also deeply engaged in the creation of and cultural reconnection to possum skin cloaks, a traditional form of dress and important biographical cultural item.

== Early life and education ==
Carol McGregor was born in Hastings, New Zealand. After earning a Bachelor of Business Studies from Massey University in 1981, McGregor studied for a Bachelor of Contemporary Australian Indigenous Art (CAIA), Queensland College of Art (QCA), Griffith University, graduating in 2012. In 2013, McGregor earned a Bachelor of Fine Art with First Class Honours, from QCA. Between 2014 and 2017, she studied for a Doctor of Philosophy degree at QCA with an Australian Postgraduate Award Scholarship.

== Career ==
Carol McGregor aims through her practice to explore alternative forms of cultural expression and to adjust new technologies that would help her further examine the diversity of ancestry, experiences and intimate histories concealed within the landscape.

For her doctoral project, McGregor examined the material culture of possum skin cloaks in South East Queensland (SEQ). Thanks to her research work and the workshop she facilitated, the contemporary making of possum skin cloak was revitalised in SEQ communities.

McGregor collaborated with Glennys Briggs on the Art of the Skins (cloak making project and exhibition) presented at the State Library of Queensland in June – Nov 2016.

McGregor's work in cast silver, Cornerstone (2011–18), was featured by the Griffith University Art Museum, Brisbane, as part of the Boundary Lines group exhibition in November 2018 – February 2019.

McGregor's latest work Skin Country (2018) was featured by the Institute of Modern Art, Brisbane, as part of The Commute exhibition in September – December 2018.

== Work ==
=== Solo exhibitions ===
- 2014 IDALIA imprints – The Webb Gallery, Qld College of Art (response to artist residency with The University of Queensland's School of Biological Sciences)
- 2015 Idalia HAAS Library, University of Qld, Brisbane
- 2018 Carol McGregor: Repositories of Recognition, Kluge-Ruhe Aboriginal Art Collection, University of Virginia

=== Major exhibitions ===
- 2009 Postcard Art & Advertising (CAIA, QCA) Cairns Indigenous Art Fair, Cairns
- 2010 On Paper, Impress Printmakers and Qld College of Art Print Club, Brisbane
- 2010 Cairns Indigenous Art Fair, Cairns
- 2010 Our Stories, Our Way, Mater Hospital, Brisbane
- 2010 Art from the Soul, Kurilpa Gallery, Brisbane
- 2011 Knots, Contemporary Artisans Collective Gallery, Brisbane
- 2012 First, Emerging Indigenous Art, Love Love Studio, Brisbane
- 2013 Artoriginal, Brisbane Town Hall
- 2013 Middle Ground, Fine Art Honours students, The Hold Artspace, Brisbane
- 2013 Field, Contemporary Landscapes, The Hold Artspace, Brisbane
- 2014 The Gather Award, St. Ita's, Brisbane
- 2014 Intimate Spaces Revealed, Canberra Contemporary Art Space, Canberra
- 2015 Art meets Science, Queensland Academy of Arts and Science, Brisbane
- 2015 My Story, The Gold Coast Arts Centre, Gold Coast.
- 2015 Blak, Art from the Margins, St Andrews Hospital, Brisbane
- 2015 Warriors, Sorcerers and Spirits, KickArts Contemporary Arts, Cairns indigenous Art Fair, Cairns
- 2015 Reconciliation Week, Judith Wright Centre, Brisbane
- 2016 Art of the Skins, State Library Queensland, Brisbane
- 2016 Gathering Strands, Redland Art Gallery, Cleveland
- 2017 Tastes Like Sunshine, Museum of Brisbane, Queensland
- 2018, So Fine: Contemporary women artists make Australian history, National Portrait Gallery, Canberra
- 2018, Boundary Lines, Griffith University Art Museum, Brisbane
- 2018 The Commute, Institute of Modern Art, Brisbane

=== Selected award exhibitions ===
- 2013 The churchie national emerging art prize, Griffith University Art Gallery (GUAG), Brisbane
- 2013 Sunshine Coast Art Prize, 3D – Finalist, Noosa Regional Gallery
- 2013 15 Artists 2013, Moreton Bay Regional Council, Redcliffe Art Gallery
- 2014 The churchie national emerging art prize, GUAG, Brisbane
- 2014 Redlands Konica Minolta Art Prize

=== Awards and nominations ===
- 2014 Winner, The Inaugural Gather Award, Brisbane
- 2015 1854 Scholar, Museum Victoria, Melbourne

== Collections ==
- Kluge-Ruhe Aboriginal Art Collection, University of Virginia
- Redland Art Gallery, Queensland
