= Peter Cooley (artist) =

Australian visual artist

- Born: 16 February 1956 (age 70); Murwillumbah, New South Wales, Australia
- Known for: Painting and ceramic sculpture

Peter Cooley (born 1956) is an Australian visual artist working in painting and ceramic sculpture. Initially recognised as a painter during the 1980s and 1990s, he later focused primarily on ceramic sculpture, particularly figurative works depicting Australian fauna. His work is held in public collections in Australia and internationally.

== Early life and education ==
Cooley was born in 1956 in Murwillumbah, New South Wales, and grew up in the Northern Rivers region. He studied at the Brisbane College of Art and later at the City Art Institute in Sydney. As a teenager he attended pottery classes in Tweed Heads, an early influence on his later engagement with ceramics.

== Career ==
=== Painting ===
Cooley first gained recognition as a painter during the 1980s and 1990s. His early work engaged with modernist abstraction and expressionist traditions and included abstracted representations of Australian landscapes such as the Blue Mountains and Mount Warning.

Writing in Garland Magazine, curator Eva Czernis-Ryl observes that the layered surfaces of Cooley’s paintings anticipate aspects of his later ceramic practice, particularly in his approach to glazing and surface treatment.

=== Ceramics ===
From the early 2000s Cooley increasingly focused on ceramics. In an interview with Art Almanac, he described being encouraged in this shift by James Mollison, former Director of the National Gallery of Australia.

His ceramic sculptures frequently depict Australian animals including kangaroos, cockatoos, cassowaries, wallabies, swans and sugar gliders. The works combine expressive modelling with elaborate glazing and painted surfaces.

Museum collection descriptions similarly note Cooley’s recurring use of Australian fauna as subject matter within a decorative sculptural tradition.

== Influences ==
Cooley has cited a range of influences across painting and ceramics, including German Expressionist artists associated with Die Brücke. He has also discussed the influence of European ceramic traditions such as Rococo porcelain, particularly the work of Johann Joachim Kändler at the Meissen manufactory.

Other influences include twentieth-century Italian ceramicists such as Lucio Fontana, Leoncillo Leonardi and Fausto Melotti, whose sculptural approaches informed Cooley’s engagement with non-utilitarian ceramic forms.

== Exhibitions and works ==
Works from Cooley’s ceramic practice include Red Kangaroo 1 (2014) and Cassowary 1 (2013). In the exhibitions Through the Archipelago I and Through the Archipelago II, he explored large-scale spatial ceramic forms influenced by Southeast Asian ancestral art, following the exhibition Life, Death and Magic: 2000 Years of Southeast Asian Ancestral Art at the National Gallery of Australia in 2010.

== Collections and awards ==
Cooley received the Gold Coast International Ceramic Art Award in 2010.

His work is held in public collections including:

- National Gallery of Australia
- National Gallery of Victoria
- Art Gallery of New South Wales
- Art Gallery of South Australia
- Art Gallery of Western Australia
- Powerhouse Museum, Sydney
- University of Queensland Art Museum
- HOTA, Gold Coast
- British Museum

== Reception ==
Cooley’s ceramic work has been discussed in contemporary craft and visual arts publications. Writing in Garland Magazine, Eva Czernis-Ryl highlights the relationship between Cooley’s earlier painting practice and his later ceramic work, particularly his use of layered surfaces and colour.

According to the Art Gallery of New South Wales, his work frequently depicts Australian animals and birds and combines a playful visual style with the decorative traditions of ceramic sculpture and his earthenware work can easily be seen within the context of painting, pushing the landscape tradition into three dimensions.

Reviewing the exhibition RocoColonial at Hazelhurst Arts Centre, ArtsHub situated Cooley’s ceramic birds within a decorative tradition connected to Rococo collecting practices.

== Representation ==
Cooley lives and works in the Blue Mountains, New South Wales, on the traditional lands of the Darug and Gundungurra peoples. He is represented by Martin Browne Contemporary in Sydney and Scott Livesey Galleries in Melbourne.
