= Bianca Beetson =

Australian artist

Dr. Bianca Beetson. AM
- Bianca Beetson in 2026
- Born: Roma, Western Queensland
- Education: Queensland University of Technology, Bachelor of Arts (Visual Arts - Honors)
- Known for: Painting, sculpture, drawing, public art, photography, installation, textiles, new media, ceramics and public art
- Movement: Contemporary Australian Aboriginal art
- Awards: Inaugural ACHAA award for Excellence by an Aboriginal Curator at 2018 IMAGinE Awards.
- Website: biancabeetson.com

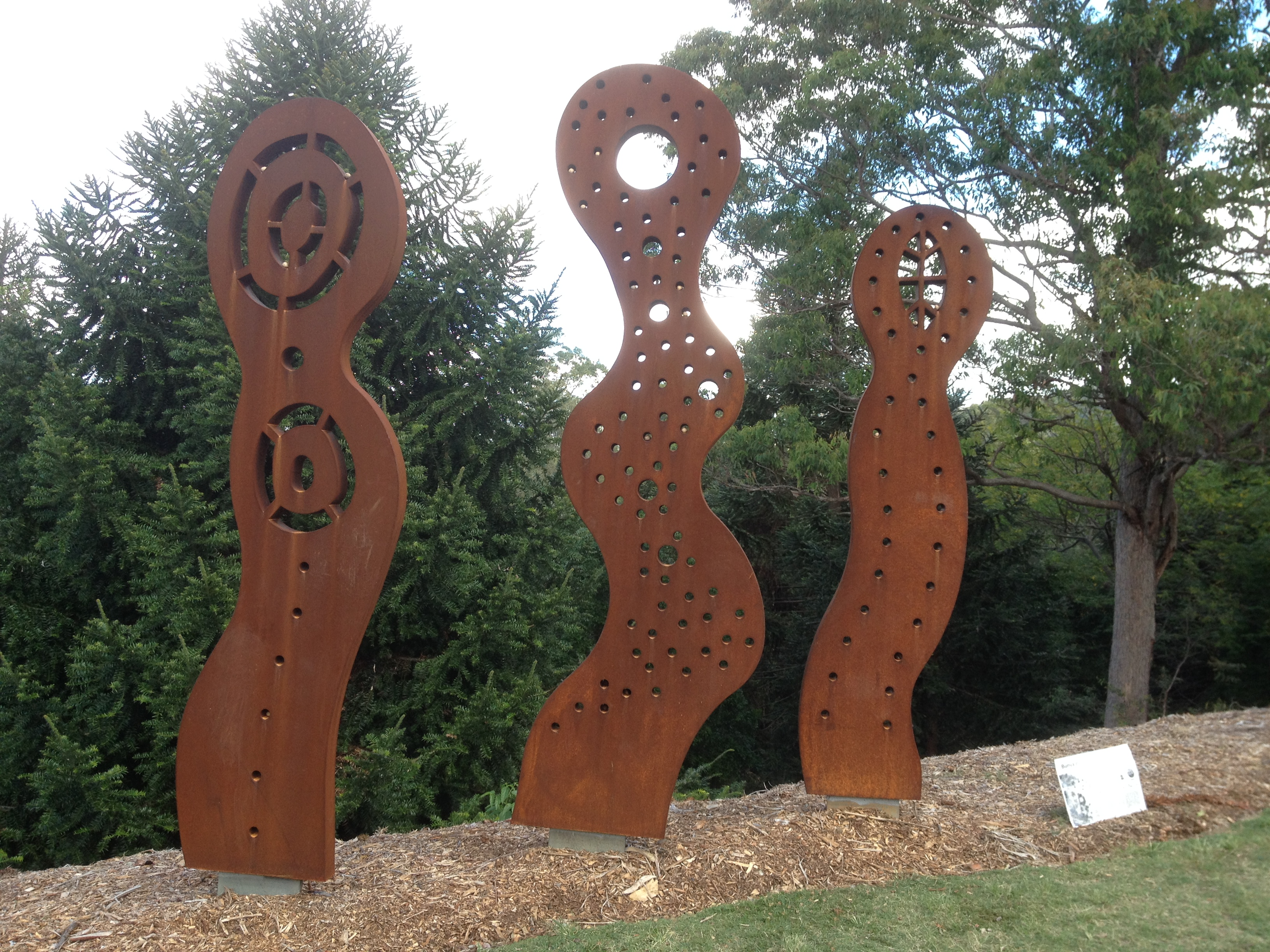
Feast of the Bon-yi, spirit figures by Bianca Beetson at the Brisbane Botanic Gardens, Mount Coot-tha

Bianca Beetson is a Kabi Kabi/Wiradjuricontemporary artist and cultural advocate.

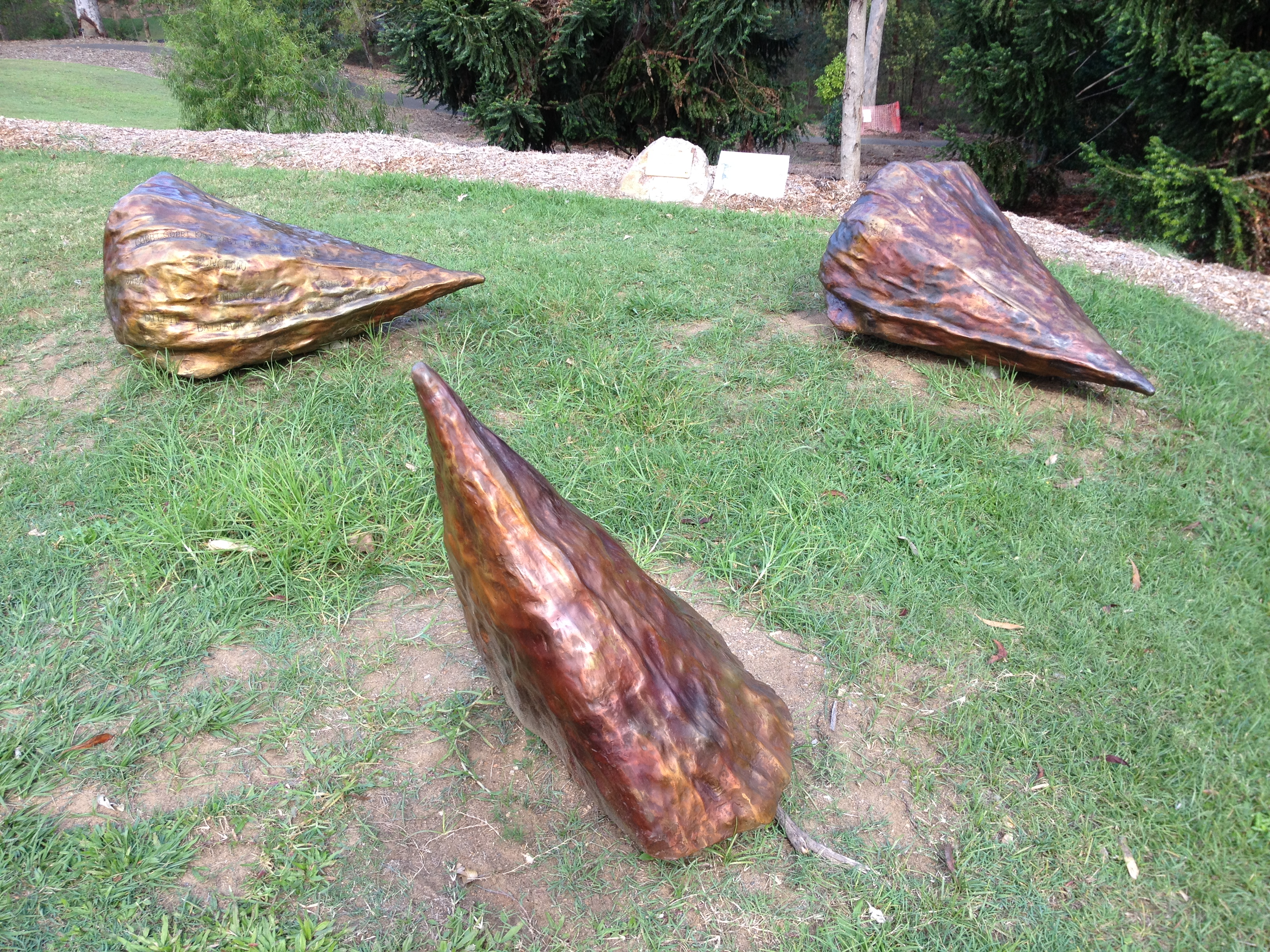
Feast of the Bon-yi, large nuts by Bianca Beetson at the Brisbane Botanic Gardens, Mount Coot-tha

== Life and career ==
Beetson was born in Roma, Western Queensland. She is an Indigenous Australian of the Kabi Kabi nation of the Sunshine Coast in South East Queensland and Wiradjuri and Ngemba from Central NSW. She studied and obtained a bachelor of arts in visual arts at the Queensland University of Technology from 1993 to 1995. She completed her honours in 1998 and was awarded a doctorate of visual arts at Griffith University in 2018.

In 1997 her work was selected for the prestigious exhibition for emerging artists, Primavera at the Museum of Contemporary Art, Sydney. She is an established Indigenous artist who lives and works in Brisbane. Her work includes media such as painting, photography, installation, new media, textiles and public art. In her paintings and sculpture she often uses shades of pink. Her work also reflects on her relationship to skin and she interprets body paint designs and scarification marks in a contemporary manner.

In 2013, she was commissioned by the Brisbane Botanic Gardens to install her sculpture, the Feast of the Bon-yi, in bronze and corten steel there on Mount Coot-tha. The cluster of large nuts and spirit figures visualises the gathering of the tribes. The nut itself symbolises a sacred object, it provides nourishment, rebirth and growth and is the reason why people travelled from so far and wide. In 2019 she had a solo show about the self-portrait called Being Human curated by Hamish Sawyer at Caloundra Regional Gallery, Sunshine Coast, Queensland.

Beetson was a member of the art collective the Campfire group which exhibited "All Stock Must Go" at the Second Asia Pacific Triennial in 1996-1997 at Queensland Art Gallery. She was also a founding member of the Aboriginal Art Collective proppaNOW in which she was active between 2004-2011.

Beetson has also taught at Queensland College of Art and Design, and was head of CAIA (Contemporary Australian Indigenous Art) the degree program for First Nations students, before taking up a post at Griffith University as head of the Indigenous Research Unit. As of 2023 she became the inaugural director, First Nations at Queensland Museum, where she now occupies the role of Executive Director First Nations, Cultures and histories.

She is the niece of Artie Beetson, a rugby league player and former Sydney Roosters coach. In honour of this legacy in 2023 she designed the inaugural Roosters Deadly Choices shirt which was a part of the clubs initiative to reward Indigenous people who undertook certain health checks. In 2025 she continued this work in designing the 2025 Queensland Maroons Indigenous jersey which was more directly designed to honour her uncles legacy.

Beetson was appointed a Member of the Order of Australia in the 2026 King's Birthday Honours in recognition of her "significant service to Indigenous art as an educator, curator and artist".
