= ProppaNOW =

Indigenous arts collective in Brisbane, Australia

proppaNOW is an arts collective for Indigenous Australian artists in Queensland. Aiming to counter cultural stereotypes and give a voice to urban artists, the collective has mounted several exhibitions around the country. The collective was founded by Richard Bell, Jennifer Herd and Vernon Ah Kee in 2003 and formalised in 2004.

== History and mission ==
The collective was first conceived in Brisbane in 1997. At its initial meeting, proppaNOW proposed to form as a group of Aboriginal Australian artists who would support each other's work and "change ideas that people had about what Aboriginal art is and what it should be". The trigger to formalise the collective came in March 2004 soon after Queensland's Premier, Peter Beattie, established QIAMEA (Queensland Indigenous Artists Marketing Export Agency) to promote and market Queensland Indigenous art. The artists were concerned that QIAMEA's focus was initially directed towards the remote regions of Queensland such as Mornington Island, Aurukun and Lockhart River, thus reinforcing cultural stereotypes.

The collective has since evolved a mission to "give urban-based Aboriginal artists a voice...[to] reinforce that Aboriginal Australia is a living culture that has evolved over time".

In June 2019, proppaNOW presented an open day at the Institute of Modern Art in Brisbane.

An exhibition entitled OCCURRENT AFFAIR: proppaNOW was originally scheduled for 2019, but was rescheduled (due to the COVID-19 pandemic in Australia) to run 13 February – 19 June 2021 at the University of Queensland Art Museum, described as a major exhibition of the artists' work "after a five-year hiatus to focus on their individual careers". The title of the exhibition references the Australian TV show A Current Affair, which is known for its sensationalist style and "derogatory representations of certain low socio-economic and minority groups".

== Members ==
Founding members were Richard Bell, Jennifer Herd, Joshua Herd and Vernon Ah Kee.

Members of the collective as of February 2020 are Bell, Herd, Ah Kee, Tony Albert, Gordon Hookey, Laurie Nilsen and Megan Cope.

== Recognition ==
proppaNOW members Richard Bell, Jennifer Herd, Vernon Ah Kee, Gordon Hookey and Laurie Nilsen have all been interviewed by the State Library of Queensland for the James C. Sourris AM Collection. In the interviews each artist talks about their life, their art and their inspirations.

In October 2022 it was announced that the collective had won the Jane Lombard Prize for Art and Social Justice for 2022–2024, by a unanimous decision of the jury, which commented: "...[proppaNOW] has broken with expectations of what is proper ('proppa') in Aboriginal art; created a new sovereign space for First Nations artists internationally outside colonial stereotypes, desires for authenticity, and capitalist capitulations; and opened new political imaginaries".

== Exhibitions ==
The collective has mounted a number of exhibitions, starting with one in Auckland, New Zealand, in 2005. Since then, many have been based in Queensland, but several have toured the country or mounted in other locations. Some recent exhibitions include:

2012

- Touchy Fearly, Fehily Contemporary, Collingwood, Victoria, July 19 – August 11, 2012.
- Existence Resistance, Bega Regional Gallery, Bega, New South Wales, July 13 – August 18, 2012.
- proppaNOW, kuril dhagun State Library of Queensland, Brisbane, May 14 – September 10, 2012.
- proppaNOW Studio Works, Montague Road Studio Space, Brisbane, Dec 6 – 30, 2012.

2013

- Insurgence, Museum of Australian Democracy, Canberra, ACT, October 2013.

2014

- The Black Line

2015

- Dark + Disturbing: Gordon Hookey for proppaNOW, Cairns Indigenous Art Fair, August 2015. Dark + Disturbing is a curatorial project by Ah Kee.

2024

- Tanah Tumpah Darah: Taring Padi & proppaNOW, Griffith Art Museum, March 2024.

== Commissions ==
- Monument: Yininmadyemi - Thou dids't let fall: Four standing bullets and three fallen shells in black marble and steel with bronze finish inscribe with war stories, installed in Hyde Park, Sydney on 25 April 2015
