= Queensland College of Art and Design =

Specialist arts and design college in Australia

Coordinates: 27°28′53.5″S 153°01′25.8″E

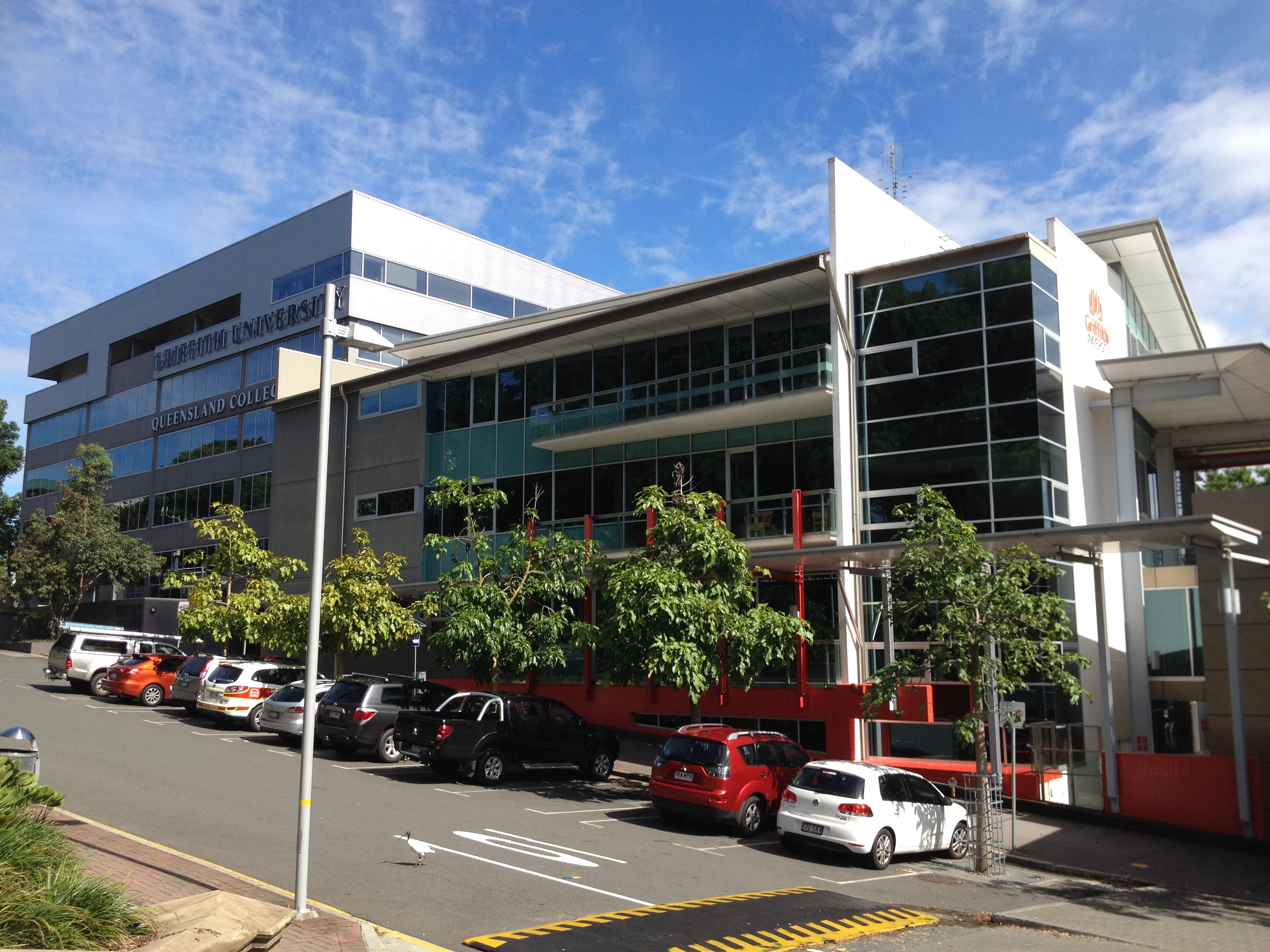
The Griffith Graduate Centre at Queensland College of Art and Design

The Queensland College of Art and Design (QCAD), established as Brisbane School of Arts and formerly known as Queensland College of Art or (QCA) after other name changes, is a specialist visual arts and design college located in South Bank, Brisbane, and Southport on the Gold Coast of Queensland, Australia. Founded in 1881, the college is one of the oldest arts institutions in Australia, and has been part of Griffith University since 1991. It is co-located with the Queensland Conservatorium; the Griffith Film School; the Griffith University Art Museum (GUAM), formerly known as Griffith University Art Gallery (GUAG); and a collection of galleries known as the QCAD Galleries.

== History ==
=== Early days and name changes ===
The college was founded as Brisbane School of Arts (in a now heritage-listed building) in 1881. Over the years it underwent a series of name changes, including Technical School of Visual Arts; the Art Branch within the Central Technical College; Seven Hills College of Art (1974); before being renamed Queensland College of Art (QCA) in 1983. It has also frequently been referred to by other sources as Queensland College of the Arts.

=== Merger with Griffith University ===
The college became part of Griffith University in the early 1990s.

=== QCAD (2024) ===
From 1 January 2024 it was officially renamed Queensland College of Art and Design (QCAD).

== Description ==
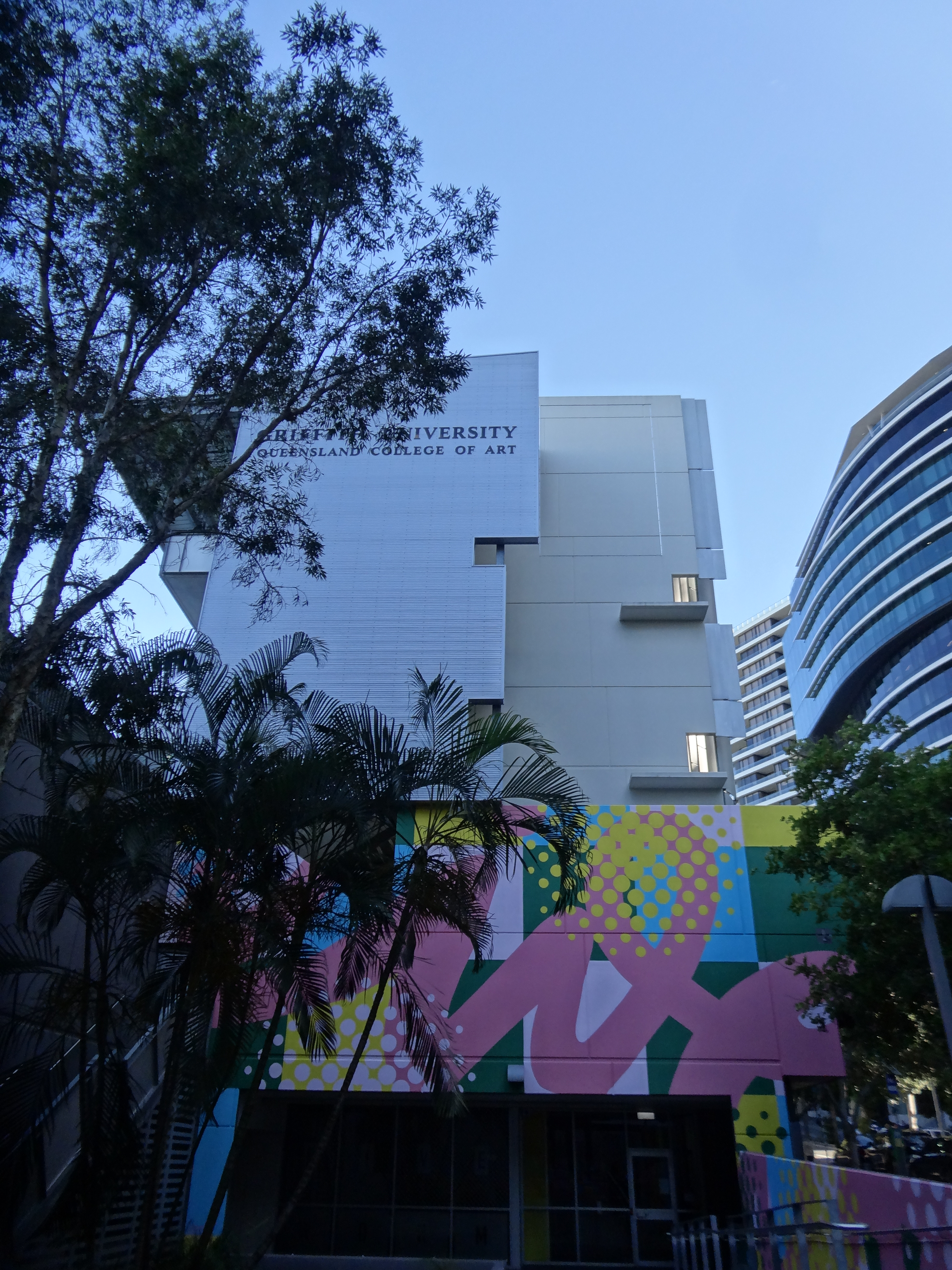
South Bank building

The college is specialist visual arts and design college located within the South Bank parklands, along with the Queensland Conservatorium, the Griffith Film School, and Griffith Graduate Centre. The college delivers programs across both South Bank and Gold Coast campuses. At South Bank the focus is on Contemporary Australian Indigenous Art, Visual Arts, and Design. The Gold Coast campus focuses specifically on design degrees.

The Queensland College of Art and Design at South Bank campus is co-located with the Griffith University Art Museum (GUAM), formerly known as Griffith University Art Gallery (GUAG), as well as a collection of galleries known as the QCAD Galleries.

GUAM houses the Griffith University Art Collection, the second largest public art collection in Queensland. The museum organises exhibitions, educational and public programs, as well as conducting "research, teaching, publishing and dialogue among communities of Griffith University students, faculty, artists, scholars, alumni, and the wider public".

QCAD is within walking distance of QAGOMA, State Library of Queensland, and the Queensland Museum.

== Galleries ==
There is a collection of galleries known as the Queensland College of Art and Design Galleries (QCAD Galleries) located on the campus. QCAD Galleries include:

- (i) Webb Gallery
- (ii) Grey Street Gallery
- (iii) Project Gallery
- (iv) PoP Gallery
- (v) White Box Gallery

== Courses ==
The college offers a range of degrees and qualifications, awarded by Griffith University, ranging from diplomas to doctoral studies. There are three main programs for undergraduates: Bachelor of Design (specialising in Product Design, Graphic Design and Interior Design), Bachelor of Visual Arts (specialising in painting, photography, sculpture, performance and installation) and the Bachelor of Contemporary Australian Indigenous Art (CAIA).

== Notable people ==
Notable people associated with the college, past and present, include:

=== Alumni ===
- Tony Albert
- Robert Andrew
- Jean Barth
- Bianca Beetson
- Anthony Bennett
- Gordon Bennett
- Peter Cooley (artist)
- d harding
- Megan Hess
- Alexander Lotersztain
- Carol McGregor
- Tracey Moffatt
- Dylan Mooney
- Mandy Quadrio
- Michael Zavros

=== Staff ===
- Justene Williams, Head of Sculpture, Performance and Installation
- Carol McGregor, Program Director (Contemporary Australian Indigenous Art)
- Julie Fragar, Artist, Deputy Director (Research)
- Sue Best, Art Historian
- Frances Wildt Pavlu, Gold and Silversmithing Department
- Jennifer Herd, convenor, both of the Bachelor Contemporary Australian Indigenous Art, 1993–2014
