= Jennifer Herd =

Australian artist

Jennifer Herd is an Australian Indigenous artist with family ties to the Mbar-barrum people of North Queensland. She is a founding member of the ProppaNOW artist collective, and taught at the Queensland College of Art in Brisbane, where she convened both the Bachelor of Fine Art and Contemporary Australian Indigenous Art. In 2003 she won the Queensland College of Art Graduate Students prize, the Theiss Art Prize, for her Masters of Visual Arts.

== Education and teaching ==
Herd received a Certificate in Fashion Design from Queensland College of Art, and worked in fashion and theater for twelve years. She then completed her Diploma of Teaching (Early Childhood Education) from Queensland University of Technology, followed by a Master of Visual Arts from Queensland College of Art. She taught at Queensland College of Art from 1993 until her retirement in 2014.

== Style and themes ==
Herd's artwork frequently explores themes related to Indigenous experience, tradition, and assimilation, based in her experience as an Indigenous woman born "out of country." Shields, an important part of North Queensland culture, are a frequent recurrent in her work, standing in for strength and protection, and drawing on the traditional practice of decoration performed by women for warriors.

== ProppaNOW ==
In 2003 Herd co-founded ProppaNOW, a collective designed to "give urban-based Aboriginal artists a voice." ProppaNOW's aim has been to work collectively to create new and better opportunities for Indigenous artists working in urban environments.

== Exhibitions and awards ==
=== Exhibitions ===
- 2015 GOMA Q: Contemporary Queensland Art Gallery of Modern Art Brisbane
- 2012 proppaNOW exhibition Fehily Contemporary Collingwood Melbourne
- 2012 proppaNOW exhibition Kural Dargun Indigenous Knowledge Centre State Library of Queensland
- 2011 Shared Vision QCA Poland Travelling Exhibition Poland
- 2011 Australia Felix Philadelphia, United States, America
- 2011 Black See Cairns Indigenous Art Fair KickArts Cairns
- 2011 Flash Women Kural Dargun Indigenous Knowledge Centre State Library of Queensland
- 2011 proppaNOW New & Recent WorksShow Canberra Art Space, ACT
- 2011 The Tower of Babel Project Woodford Folk Festival contributing artist Woodford
- 2010 Southbank Board Walk Project Griffith University and Southbank Corp
- 2010 Just Drawn Linden Gallery Fitzroy Melbourne Victoria
- 2010 Putsch Adelaide Festival contributing artist proppaNOW Tandanya Exhibition Adelaide
- 2009-2010 Woodford Folk Festival Canoe Project contributing artist Woodford
- 2010 proppaNOW Women’s Business Sydney College of Art
- 2007 Friendly Fire GPG George Petelin Gallery Southport
- 2007 Thresh Holds of Tolerance Canberra School of Arts Australian National University
- 2006 Colonial to Contemporary QCA, 125 years Galleria Queensland College of Art South Brisbane
- 2006 There Goes the Neighbourhood proppaNOW Studios West End
- 2005 San Francisco Bayiennally’ San Francisco California USA
- 2005 Thick and Fast proppaNOW Group Show Powerhouse QLD
- 2005 proppaNOW Launch Show ProppaNOW Studios West End Brisbane
- 2005 Q Pacifica Project Gallery QCA Griffith University Brisbane
- 2005 Dreaming Festival ProppaNOW Lane Gallery Auckland New Zealand
- 2005 ProppaNOW Brisbane Convention Centre Brisbane

=== Selected awards ===
- 2017 Sunshine Coast Art Prize (Highly Commended Award) Caloundra Regional Gallery
- 2016 33rd National Aboriginal and Torres Strait Islander Art Awards (Finalist) Museum and Art Gallery Northern Territory
- 2003 Theiss Prize (winner) QCA Gallery Griffith University Southbank

== Career and Influences ==
In 2021 Jennifer Herd was interviewed in a digital story and oral history for the State Library of Queensland's James C Sourris AM Collection. In the interview Herd talks to artist and academic, Pat Hoffie about her life, her art and her inspirations.
