= Gordon Hookey =

Australian Aboriginal artist

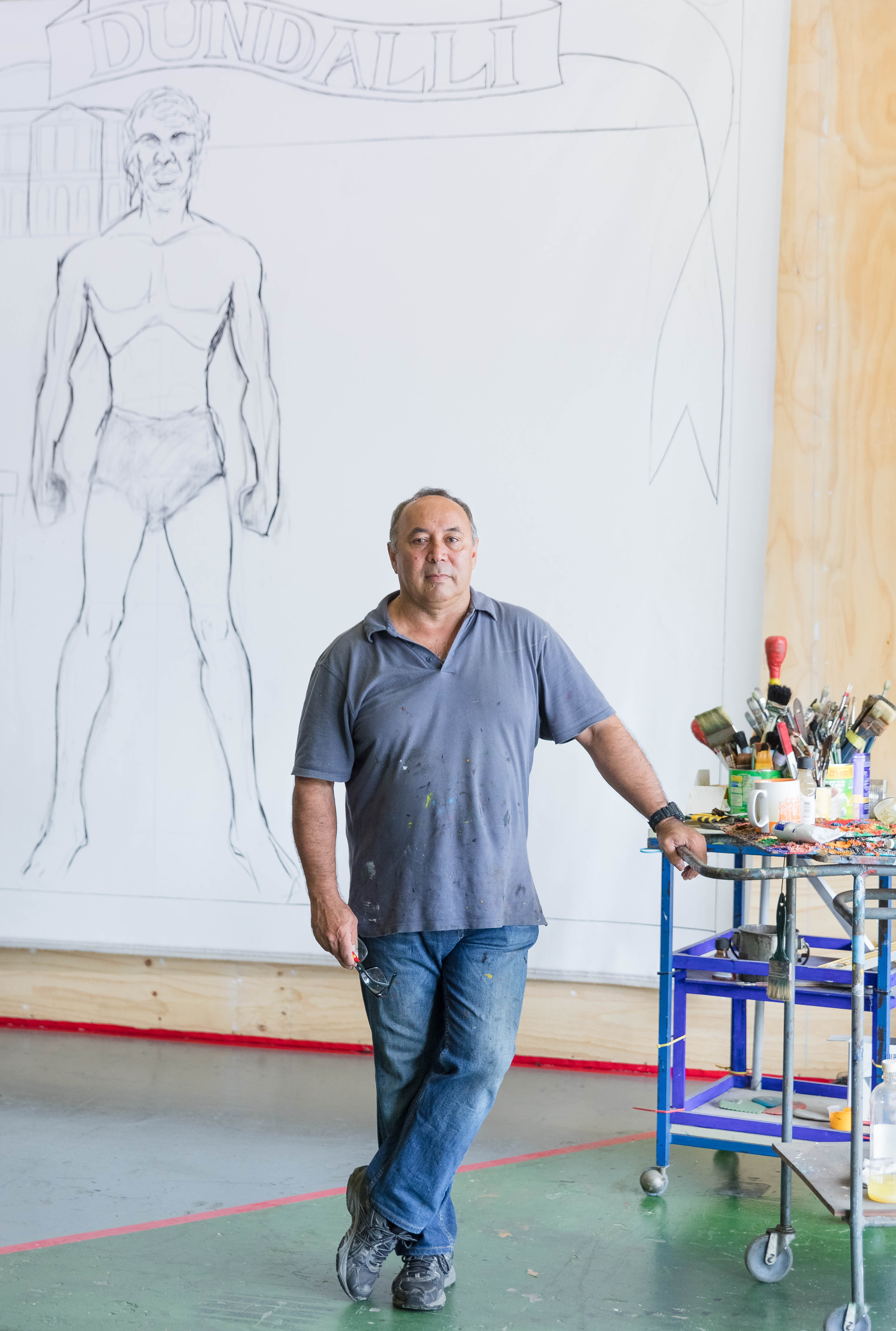
Hookey in his studio

Gordon Hookey (born 1961 in Cloncurry) is an Australian Aboriginal artist from the Waanyi people. He has a Bachelor of Fine Arts (1992) and lives in Brisbane, Australia. He is primarily known as a painter but his practice also involves sculpture, installation, drawing, photography, and to a lesser extent, animation.

Hookey is a core member of the Brisbane-based Indigenous collective proppaNOW.

Hookey has been exhibited in the Sydney Biennale with Paranoia Annoy Ya. He had an exhibition called Ruddock's Wheel, which made fun of a comment by Philip Ruddock who said that Aboriginal people had not used the wheel.

In 2007, Hookey was amongst 60 artists profiled in Sonia Payes' book Untitled. Portraits of Australian Artists.

Since 2015 Hookey has been working on his first survey show MURRILAND! which consists of a series of monumental paintings (ten metre canvases), which depict the history of Queensland and combine Aboriginal and non-Indigenous narratives from pre-colonisation to the current day. In this show Hookey was inspired by Tshibumba Kanda-Matulu's history of Zaire which is the modern-day Democratic Republic of the Congo. In this show he sought to examine how we may better understand how Aboriginal voices continue to be silenced and appropriated and, of this, he states:

When someone looks at an artwork they take with them their whole life, their screens of socialisation and they will look at that artwork through their experience … a lot of time they will blame the artist for their interpretation.

— Gordon Hookey, via Memo Magazine, 2022

In 2018 Gordon Hookey was interviewed in a digital story and oral history for the State Library of Queensland's James C Sourris AM Collection. In the interview Hookey talks to Bruce McLean, Curator of Indigenous Australian Art at the Queensland Gallery of Modern Art about his life, his inspirations and the meanings of his works.

His work is part of numerous museum collections among which the Aboriginal Art Museum Utrecht, in the Netherlands. On the occasion of the closure of the museum, the Amsterdam based art platform Framer Framed organised the exhibition In the future everything will be as certain as it used to be (2017) where his work was shown.
