= Richard Bell (artist) =

Aboriginal Australian artist

- Born: December 13, 1953 (age 72); Charleville, Queensland, Australia
- Known for: Painting, contemporary Indigenous Australian art
- Awards: National Aboriginal & Torres Strait Islander Art Award

Richard Bell (born 13 December 1953) is an Aboriginal Australian artist and political activist. He is one of the founders of proppaNOW, a Brisbane-based Aboriginal art collective.

== Early life ==
Born in 1953 in Charleville, Queensland, Bell is a Kamilaroi man.

He engaged in political activism in Redfern, Sydney, in the 1970s, in causes such as Aboriginal self-determination. His art continues to reflect this.

== Themes and media ==
Bell works in many media: paintings, video art, installations, text art and performance art. His subjects are largely based on various Indigenous rights issues: the effect of colonialism on Aboriginal people in Australia, which has rendered their history invisible; identity; and the complex issues surrounding the production of Aboriginal art.

== Career ==
In 2003, Bell co-founded the Indigenous art collective proppaNOW, with Jennifer Herd, Vernon Ah Kee, and others. In the same year, his work came to the attention of the wider public for Scientia E Metaphysica (Bell's Theorem).

In 2006, the Queensland art critic Rex Butler profiled his work for Australian Art Collector magazine.

Bell caused controversy in April 2011 after revealing that he had selected the winner of the prestigious Sir John Sulman Prize through the toss of a coin.

In 2011 Bell was interviewed in a digital story and oral history for the State Library of Queensland's James C Sourris AM Collection. In the interview Bell talks to art historian Rex Butler about the development of his artistic practice, about winning the NATSIAA award, and the artist group proppaNOW.

In March 2012, Bell won a court case against a person who had issued a take-down notice in 2011, for "unjustifiable threats of copyright infringement", and was awarded A$147,000 in damages, setting "an important precedent".

In 2013 he presented the eight-episode TV series Colour Theory on National Indigenous Television.

His self-portrait was a finalist of the 2015 Archibald Prize. Bell created a new series of paintings and an installation for display at documenta 15, a major exhibition in Germany, in 2022.

== Significant works ==
=== Bell's Theorem (2003) ===
Bell came to the attention of the wider community after his 240×540 cm painting Scientia E Metaphysica (Bell's Theorem) won the 2003 Telstra National Aboriginal & Torres Strait Islander Art Award (NATSIAA). It prominently featured the text "Aboriginal art. It's a white thing". In his manifesto accompanying the work, Bell pointed out inequities that had existed in the Aboriginal art industry for a long time.

=== Pay the Rent (2022) / Embassy (2013) ===
Bell's work Pay the Rent, aka Embassy, a replica of the Aboriginal Tent Embassy, was first displayed in Melbourne in 2013.

In 2022, Pay the Rent debuted at Kassel for Documenta fifteen. Bell says that the work "represents a number calculating how much money the Australian Government owes Aboriginal people — and that's just for the rent of the place".

The interior of the Embassy tent functions as a display space, in which videos and other archival materials are shown, and for hosting public talks and performances, and informal conversations.

The work has travelled across the world, addressing local differences in race and politics through talks and screenings.

Pay the Rent has since been erected at Performa 15 in New York City and at the 2019 Venice Biennale in 2019.

In mid-2022, the work was installed on Friedrichsplatz, in front of Fridericianum, a museum in Kassel, Germany, as part of the international quinquennial exhibition Documenta fifteen.

Pay the Rent / Embassy was displayed in Adelaide on the forecourt of the Art Gallery of South Australia, as part of Tarnanthi, on 22–23 October 2022. It was accompanied by film screenings and talks, as part of the Adelaide Film Festival's new visual arts programme.

In May to June 2023 the installation appeared at London's Tate Modern museum, installed in the infamous Turbine Hall.

In June 2024, Pay the Rent, and Embassy, were presented at the RISING: festival in Melbourne. The canvass Embassy tent was erected in Melbourne's Federation Square as part of 'The Blak Infinite' program surrounded by painted protest signs reminiscent of the original. The tent hosted screenings of Bell's films, Bell's Theorem (2022) and No Tin Shack (2022), as well the documentary film Ningla A-Na. Pay the Rent was exhibited at the State Library Victoria.

== Awards ==
- 2003: Telstra National Aboriginal & Torres Strait Islander Art Award for Scientia E Metaphysica (Bell's Theorem)

== Exhibitions ==
=== Group ===
Bell's work has been included in many significant group exhibitions, including:

- 1992, 2008 and 2016: Biennale of Sydney
- 2006: Institute of Modern Art, Brisbane (Positivity)
- 2007: the first National Indigenous Art Triennial at the National Gallery of Australia
- 2015: the 8th Asia Pacific Triennial at QAGOMA
- 2022: documenta 15, Kassel, Germany (joined by Aboriginal artist, Gary Foley, Canadian Indigenous curator Wanda Nanibush, and Brisbane-based Indigenous youth collective Digi Youth Arts)
- 2024: RISING: festival, Melbourne

=== Solo ===
Solo exhibitions include:

- 2021: first major solo exhibition, at Sydney's Museum of Contemporary Art Australia
- June 2022: first major European solo show at the Van Abbemuseum in Eindhoven, The Netherlands, for which Bell wrote a follow-up to his 2002 Theorem, titled "Contemporary art. It's a white thing"
- 2022: exhibition and commissioned work for the Castello di Rivoli in Turin, Italy, a replica of the shack he grew up in near Charleville, which was demolished local authorities in 1967

== Collections ==
Bell's Archibald Prize entry, Me, is in the University of Queensland's art museum. Other works are held in many collections, including:

- Art Gallery of New South Wales
- Museum of Contemporary Art Australia
- National Gallery of Australia
- National Gallery of Victoria (NGV), Melbourne
- Queensland Art Gallery | Gallery of Modern Art
- Chau Chak Wing Museum
- White Bay Power Station
