= Australian rules football in the Northern Territory =

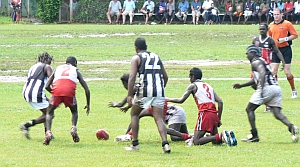
- Tiwi Islands Football League Grand Final 05/06 at Nguiu stadium—Mulluwurri vs Pumurali.
- Governing body: AFL Northern Territory
- First played: Darwin 12 February 1916; 110 years ago
- Registered players: 7,158 (adult); 3,917 (child)

Club competitions
- Northern Territory Football League; Central Australian Football League Barkly Australian Football League; Big Rivers Football League; CAFL Community League; Elcho Island Football League; Gove Australian Football League; Groote Eylandt Football League; Gunbalanya Football League; Lajamanu Football League; Maningrida Football League; Ngukurr Football League; Ramingining Football League; Wilurrara Tjataku Football League; Tanami Football League; Tiwi Islands Football League; Wadeye Football League

Audience records
- Single match: 17,500 (Aboriginal All-Stars vs Carlton; 2002; AFL pre-season practice; Marrara Oval, Darwin)

In the Northern Territory (NT), Australian rules football is a popular participation and spectator sport, particularly among the many remote Indigenous Australian communities of the outback such as the Tiwi Islands but also in the capital Darwin and the cities of Palmerston and Alice Springs. There are more than 15 regional competitions across the territory, the highest profile being the semi-professional Northern Territory Football League based around Darwin and Central Australian Football League around Alice Springs. It is governed by AFL Northern Territory (AFL NT). 7,158 adults and 3,917 children play it, of which about a third are female. Participation per capita has fallen from 18% in 2017 when it had the highest rate for a team sport in Australia to 3.4% in 2024 and fourth behind soccer, basketball and cricket.

The territory's men's team made a single interstate representational appearance at the 1988 Adelaide Bicentennial Carnival. Selected under State of Origin criteria and featuring such names as Maurice Rioli, Michael Long and Michael McLean it went through undefeated to take out the Division 2 premiership with big wins against Tasmania, the VFA and the national amateurs team. In 1993 it was merged with Queensland to create a composite side which has not appeared since. Northern Territory had a standalone representative side in the underage National Championships between 1979 and 2016, this side won three Division 2 titles—Under 16 in 1999, and Under 19 in 2004 and 2012. Since 2021, the Northern Territory Academy has participated in the Talent League. Darwin was home to the national indigenous representative teams including the Indigenous All-Stars between 1994 and 2009 and the Flying Boomerangs. The All-Stars hold the current attendance record for any football code in the Territory - 17,500 set in 2002. A professional club, the Northern Territory Football Club (NT Thunder) was formed in 2008 and competed in the second tier semi-national NEAFL competition.

Since the first Australian Football League (AFL) match played in Darwin during the 2004 AFL season, attendances have averaged 9,320. They have steadily declined from a peak of 14,100 in 2006 (featuring the Western Bulldogs). Under the 2020 arrangement with the Gold Coast Suns and Melbourne FC, the NT receives two matches in Darwin (Marrara Oval) and one in Alice Springs (Traeger Park) each year. In addition, Darwin hosted the 2020 Dreamtime match including the first AFL Women's (AFLW) fixture during the 2024 season. The AFL's Gold Coast Suns have access to the best junior talent from the Territory through its recruitment zone and the Gold Coast Suns Academy. In 2021, following a 2018 scoping study, AFL NT made an official bid to enter an NT based team in the AFL for entry around 2030.

Since the debut of Reuben Cooper in 1969, over 100 of born-and-raised Territorians have played in the AFL and AFLW. However, a significant percentage have launched their professional football careers from other states, particularly South Australia, Western Australia and Queensland. Nevertheless, the sport in 2017 produced more professional players per capita AFL than any other state or territory. Two dynasties from the NT have together produced numerous prominent footballers: the Rioli and Long families. Australian Football Hall of Famer Maurice Rioli was known also for his career in the WAFL prior to playing in Victoria. Hall of Famer Andrew McLeod is often considered the most accomplished AFL player born and raised in the NT, and Hall of Famer Nathan Buckley is the only Territorian to win the Brownlow Medal. Darwin-born Shaun Burgoyne holds both the Territorian AFL games and goals records, with 407 games and 302 goals. Shaun Burgoyne and Cyril Rioli have played in 4 AFL premierships, more than any other Territorian. In the AFLW, Danielle Ponter of the Rioli-Long family is the most prominent NT player, having kicked the most goals and played the most games.

== History ==
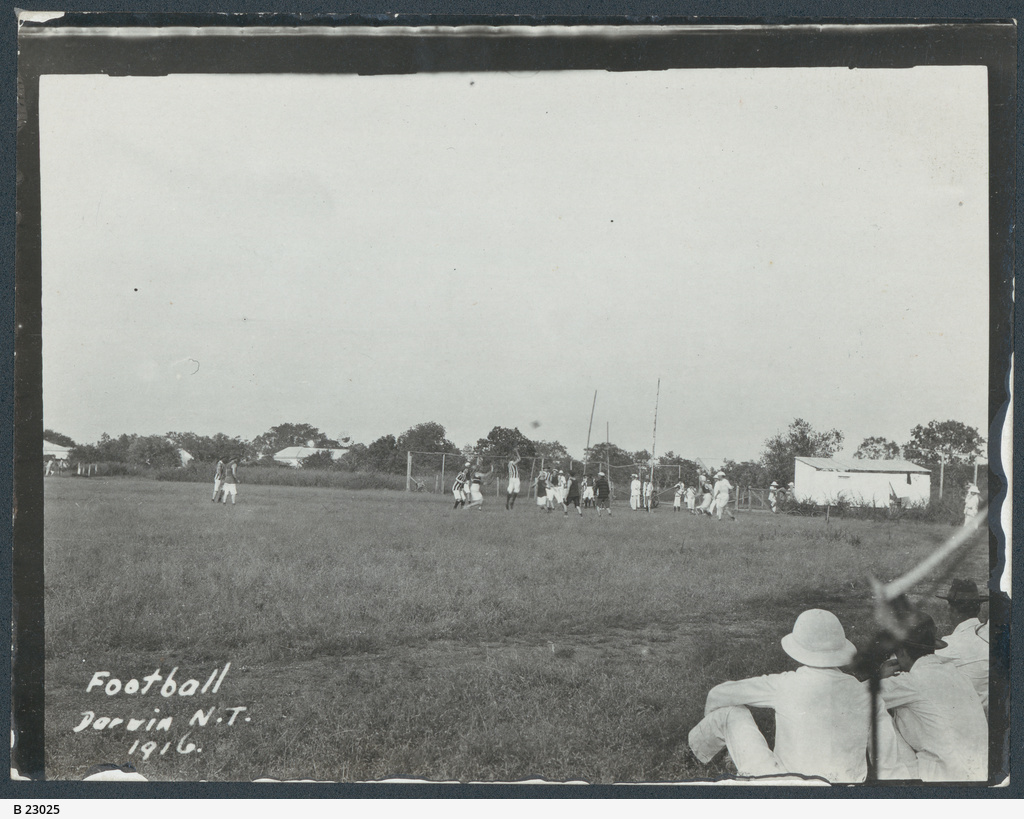
Football at Town Oval in Darwin, 1916

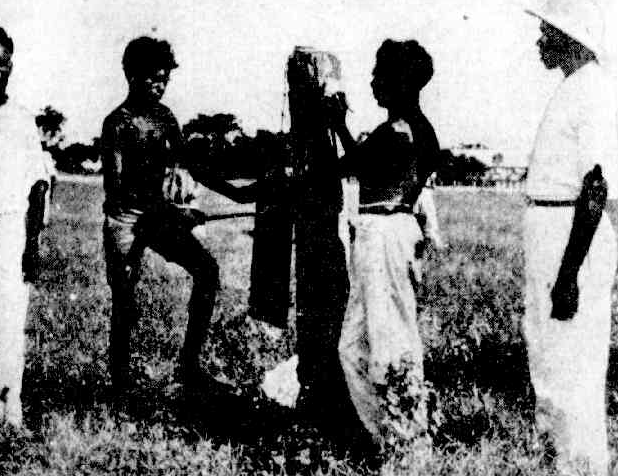
In 1940 football had become so popular with the Indigenous community in Darwin that most match officials (time keeper, siren sounder and scorer were indigenous)

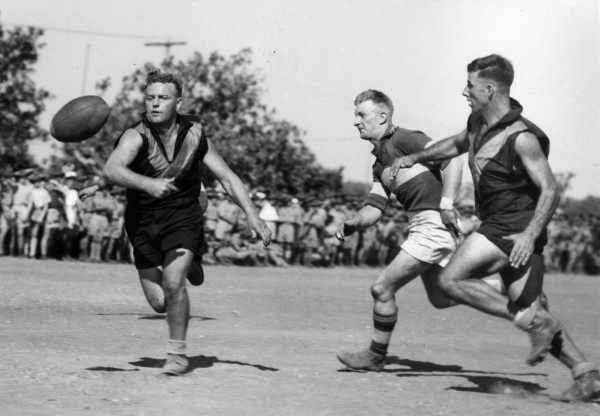
A football match being played in Darwin in 1943.

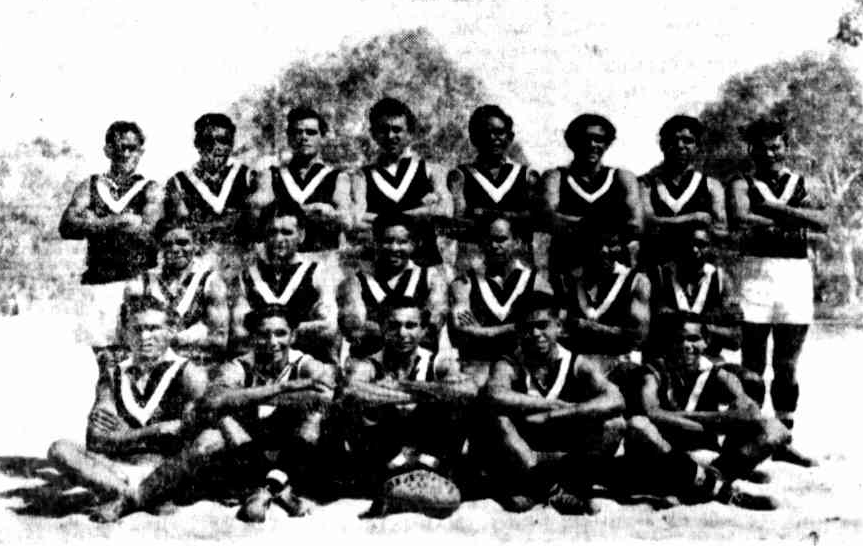
Pioneers Central Australian Football Association Premiers 1953

Prior to separation from South Australia, during the 1870s and 1880s the local media reported almost equally on both Australian rules and rugby, there was a growing awareness of international rugby and also of both American football and soccer. Australian rules began to gain favour in the Northern Territory late 1880s due mainly to South Australia's involvement in intercolonials with Victoria. Apart from the difficulties presented by distance and population, attempts to form a local football club were hampered by the lack of an oval, with the only available oval in being by destroyed white ants. Following separation from South Australia in 1911, association football was the first form of football played in the NT, with a match against British sailors from the HMS Prometheus taking place in 1912. However, there were insufficient local footballers to field a full team.

Reuben Cooper Snr, an Iwaidja person, is credited with introducing Australian rules football in Darwin in 1915 after learning the game while boarding at St Peter's College, Adelaide. The first rugby match was played on 3 February 1916, and an Australian rules match was also planned for that day but proved difficult to organise due to insufficient numbers.

=== First Matches (1916) and foundation of the NTFL ===
The first recorded match of Australian rules football in Darwin was played on Saturday, 12 February 1916, on Darwin Town Oval between Red and Blue (32) and Red and White (20). It was followed by a second match the following Saturday organised as a Red Cross fundraiser. The NT Football Association was formed shortly thereafter with its first regular competition matches beginning in March 1916.

The Northern Territory Football League (NTFL) was incorporated in 1917 and chose to play in the Northern Territory's 'wet season', primarily due to hard playing surfaces during the 'dry season'. Games were played on the Esplanade or Town Oval. Most other leagues in Australia operate during the winter, but since the NT does not have a winter, it is played at different times. The Wanderers Football Club were the founding members of the league in 1916.

=== Expansion throughout the territory 1935-1991 ===
Australian rules was introduced to Port Keats (now Wadeye) by Father Richard Docherty with the commencement of the local mission Werntek Nganayi in 1935.

By 1940, football matches in Darwin were not only highly popular with the Indigenous community but also highly multicultural, with a high percentage of the crowd being Chinese.

John Pye and Andy Howley introduced Australian rules football to the Tiwi Islands in 1941, which grew to become the most popular sport there. Within a couple of decades, the major Australian leagues began to take an interest with the first player offered a contract being Joe Saturninas in 1955 followed by the more successful David Kantilla in the SANFL and later by Maurice Rioli in the VFL. Today, around a third of the Territorians in the national AFL are from the islands. The Tiwi Islands Football League is a strong competition which feeds players into the NTFL. Skills of the TIFL players are widely celebrated. The TIFL Grand Final is the largest event on the island and a major tourist drawcard.

The Central Australian Football Association began in 1947 and quickly became Alice Springs most popular sport.

In 1954, the NTFL moved from the ageing Darwin Town Oval to the newly opened Gardens Oval.

It was established on the Goulburn Island at Warruwi in 1959.

In 1974, the Gove Australian Football League began, establishing the sport in Arnhem Land and the Gove Peninsula. In 1988, competition began in the Katherine region with the establishment of the Katherine District Football League. At the inland townships of Tennant Creek and to a lesser extent Katherine, rugby league is popular due to it being established earlier (at Tennant Creek in the 1930s and Katherine in the 1960s) and the strong Queensland influence being close to the inland route between Queensland, Darwin and Alice Springs. Nevertheless, the Barkly Australian Football League was formed in 1991 after Tennant Creek withdrew from the Central Australian to form its own local competition

=== AFL presence (1990s) ===
In 1991, Marrara Oval was increased in capacity, and became the new home for the NTFL and AFL matches. The first AFL pre-season fixture between Collingwood and West Coast was played in February 1992 in front of a crowd of 11,000 spectators.

In 1991, Darwin hosted the first Arafura Games, the first international competition to include Australian rules football, and local teams have competed against nations from around the world. The city has hosted the competition ever since.

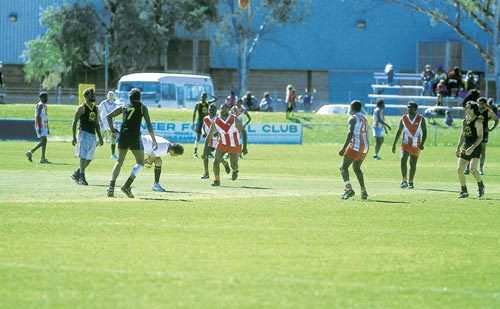
Central Australian Football League match at Traeger Park, Alice Springs in 2007.

In 2000, the Tanami Football League was formed by the Yuendumu Substance Misuse Aboriginal Corporation.

=== AFL governance (2001-present) ===
On 3 September 2001, the businesses of the formerly independent Northern Territory Football League Incorporated (NTFL) were taken-over by the Melbourne-based AFL and became AFL Northern Territory (AFL NT).

In 2002, a record crowd of 17,500 attended an AFL pre-season practice between the Indigenous All-Stars and Carlton Football Club.

In a deal struck with the Northern Territory government, Melbourne based Western Bulldogs AFL side has played several home games a year at Marrara Oval.

The first NT women's league was founded in 2004 as a division of the NTFL in Darwin.

In 2004, Alice Springs main ground Traeger Park was re-developed to AFL standards with a view of hosting preseason matches.

In 2007, a representative side began in earnest a campaign to join a major league, the SANFL, WAFL or QAFL with the new team split between Alice Springs and Darwin. A decision was reached in late 2008, with the Northern Territory Football Club, known as the Thunder, formed to field a team in the Queensland competition from the 2009 season onwards. The Thunder participated in the NEAFL, an elite competition for clubs from Queensland, New South Wales and Canberra as well as the reserve teams of four AFL clubs (Sydney, GWS Giants, Brisbane and Gold Coast). Despite its success, the NT Thunder was wound up in 2019 due to financial stresses on the NT AFL.

In 2009, a league was established on Groote Eylandt which quickly became popular. In 2012, the Wilurrara Tjataku Football League was established due to the substantial obstacles faced by remote communities to travel to Alice Springs.

In 2017, the AFL's Melbourne Football Club and Melbourne Cricket Club began a fundraiser to turf the desert football ground surface at Northern Territory home of the Ltyentye Apurte Community 80 km south east of Alice Springs. Completed in 2021, the softer ground helped establish a new league, the CAFL Country League Premiership.

NT women played a prominent role in the Crows inaugural AFLW team, with the teams playing under a combined Northern Territory/South Australia banner. As of the start of 2017 players included Sophie Armitstead, Stevie-Lee Thompson of Wanderers, Ange Foley, Abbey Holmes, Heather Anderson and Lauren O'Shea of the Waratahs, Tayla Thorn of St Mary's, Sally Riley of Tracy Village and Jasmine Anderson of the Darwin Buffaloes.

== Competitions ==
Locations of regional governing bodies with active competitions (yellow is competitions run from other juridictions with NT clubs with points indicating approximate epicentres of NT clubs)

=== Men's ===
Active in competition

League	Years with NT clubs	Senior NT clubs	Divisions	Headquarters	Notes
Northern Territory Football League (NTFL)	1916-	15	2	Darwin	Affiliate of AFLNT
Central Australian Football League (CAFL)	1947-	16	2	Alice Springs	Affiliate of AFLNT
Tiwi Islands Football League (TIFL)	1968-	8	1	Wurrumiyanga	Formerly the Nguilla Football League. Affiliate of AFLNT
Gove Australian Football League	1974-	5	1	Nhulunbuy	Affiliate of AFLNT
Top End Australian Football Association (TEAFA)	1978-2009	8	1	Darwin	
Masters Australian Football NT	1981-	3	1	Darwin	
Big Rivers Australian Football League (BRFL)	1988-	8	1	Katherine	Formerly known as the Katherine District Football League. Affiliate of AFLNT
Ramingining Football League	198?, 2016-	8	1	Ramingining	Restarted in 2016 after pause between 2009 and 2016 due to violence
Barkly Australian Football League (BAFL)	1991-	8	1	Tennant Creek	Affiliate of AFLNT
AFL Mt Isa	1993-	1	1	Mt Isa, Queensland	Alpurrurulam. Affiliate of AFL Queensland
Tanami Football League	2000-	5	1	Yuendumu	
Queensland Australian Football League	2008-2010	1		Brisbane, Queensland	NT Thunder
Wadeye Football League	2009-	7	1	Wadeye	
APY League	2009-	1	1	Pukatja, South Australia	Aputula. (Run by the South Australian National Football League)
Groote Eylandt Football League	2009-	5	1	Alyangula	
Elcho Island Football League (EIFL) & Galiwinku Football Association	2010	8	1	Galiwinku	
Wilurrara Tjataku Football League	2011-	7	1	Papunya	
North East Australian Football League	2011-2019	1		Sydney, New South Wales	NT Thunder Foxtel Cup (Folded)
League Championship Cup	2011-2013	1		Melbourne, Victoria	NT Thunder Discontinued
Lajamanu Football League	2012-	7	1	Lajamanu	
Maningrida Football League	2012-	10	1	Maningrida	Affiliate of AFLNT
Ngukurr Football League	2013-	5	1	Ngukurr	
Gunbalanya Football League	2014-	5	1	Gunbalanya	
CAFL Country League	2021-	4	1	Ltyentye Apurte Community	

=== Women's ===
Active in competition

League	Years with NT clubs	Senior NT clubs	Divisions	Headquarters	Notes
NTFL Women's	2004-	10	1	Darwin	
EIFL Women's	2011-	4	1	Galiwinku	
CAFL Women's	2013-	6	1	Alice Springs	
BRFL Women's	2022-	4	1	Katherine	
Wadeye Football League Women's	2021-	3	1	Wadeye	
BAFL Women's	2022-	5	1	Tennant Creek	
TIFL Women's	2023-	5	1	Wurrumiyanga	

=== Juniors ===
Active in competition

League	Years with NT clubs	NT clubs	Notes
NTFL Juniors (U12-U18)		7	
CAFL Juniors (M U15, U18; F: U17)		5	
CAFL Country League Juniors (M U15, U18; F: U16)		6	
BAFL Juniors (Mixed U14; M: U17; F: U17)		5	
BRFL Juniors (M: U12, U16)		5	
Gapuwiyak Football League (M: U12, U17)	2012-2013	4	Held in Gapuwiyak
National Championships (U16)	1979-2016 (M), 2017- (M & F)	1	Northern Territory Academy
National Championships (U18)	1979-2016 (M)	1	Northern Territory Academy
Women's National Championships (U16, U18)	2017-	1	Northern Territory Academy
Talent League Boys (M U19)	2000–2016, 2021-	1	Northern Territory Academy
Talent League Girls (F U19)	2021-	1	Northern Territory Academy

== Team of the Century ==
On 3 September 2016, the AFLNT named their team of the 20th century.

Backs:	Joel Bowden	Russell Jeffrey	Bill Dempsey
Half Backs:	Nathan Buckley	Michael Athanasiou	Michael McLean
Centres:	Michael Long	Andrew McLeod (c)	John Tye
Half Forwards:	Michael Graham	Joe Bonson	Maurice Rioli
Forwards:	Darryl White	Dennis Dunn	Clifford Lew Fatt
Followers:	David Kantilla	Reuben Cooper Sr	Cyril Rioli Jr
Interchange:	Gilbert McAdam	Jimmy Anderson	Walter Lew Fatt
	Cyril Rioli Sr

Coach of the Century: John Taylor.

== Representative teams ==
The Northern Territory was represented in early Interstate matches in Australian rules football, before being incorporated into the QLD/NT and then Allies representative sides. They won the Australian National Football Carnival (Div 2) Championship in 1988.

At Under 16 and Under 18 level, the NT fields teams in the national championships.

The Indigenous All-Stars, a team composed of indigenous Australian players mostly from the AFL and all over the country, are based in Darwin. Darwin is also home of the Flying Boomerangs, the junior indigenous side, which has toured the world to play matches against other countries.

=== Uniforms ===
Northern Territory	Queensland/N.T.

== Audience ==
=== Attendance record ===
- 17,500 (Aboriginal All-Stars vs Carlton; 2002; AFL pre-season practice; Marrara Oval, Darwin)

== Major Australian rules events in the Northern Territory ==
- Northern Territory Football League Grand Final
- Tiwi Islands Football League Grand Final
- Arafura Games (quadrennial)
- Australian Football League Premiership Season (Melbourne 'home' games)

== Players ==
=== Participation ===
According to Ausplay, participation in the NT has declined rapidly in recent years, from over 10,000 participants and 7% per capita participation to just over 7,000 and 3.6% in just a few years.

In 2017, AFLNT reported 44,729 direct participants in Australian rules football through official competitions or programs, which makes up 18% of the NT population. There are also around 15,000 more participants in AFL promotional activities.

Around half of all participants are in non-metropolitan areas of the Northern Territory, and a growing 34% of participants are women.

The Tiwi Islands is said to have the highest participation rate in Australia (35%) .

Adult players
2016	2021/22	2023/24
8,519	10,021	7,158

=== Greats ===
The Northern Territory has produced a disproportionate amount of talent for elite leagues such as the Australian Football League, South Australian National Football League and West Australian Football League, including many Indigenous Australian players.

Territorian Hall of Famers include: Maurice Rioli, Michael Long, Andrew McLeod and Nathan Buckley.

Notable Territorian players in the AFL include: Shaun Burgoyne, Michael McLean, Daryl White, Aaron Davey, Cyril Rioli, Joel Bowden, Brad Ottens, Mathew Stokes, Ronnie Burns, Peter Burgoyne, David Kantilla, Jared Brennan, Matthew Whelan, Daniel Motlop, Richard Tambling, Gilbert McAdam, Fabian Francis, Xavier Clarke and Dean Rioli.

Other greats who did not play in the AFL include Bill Dempsey, Michael Graham and David Kantilla.

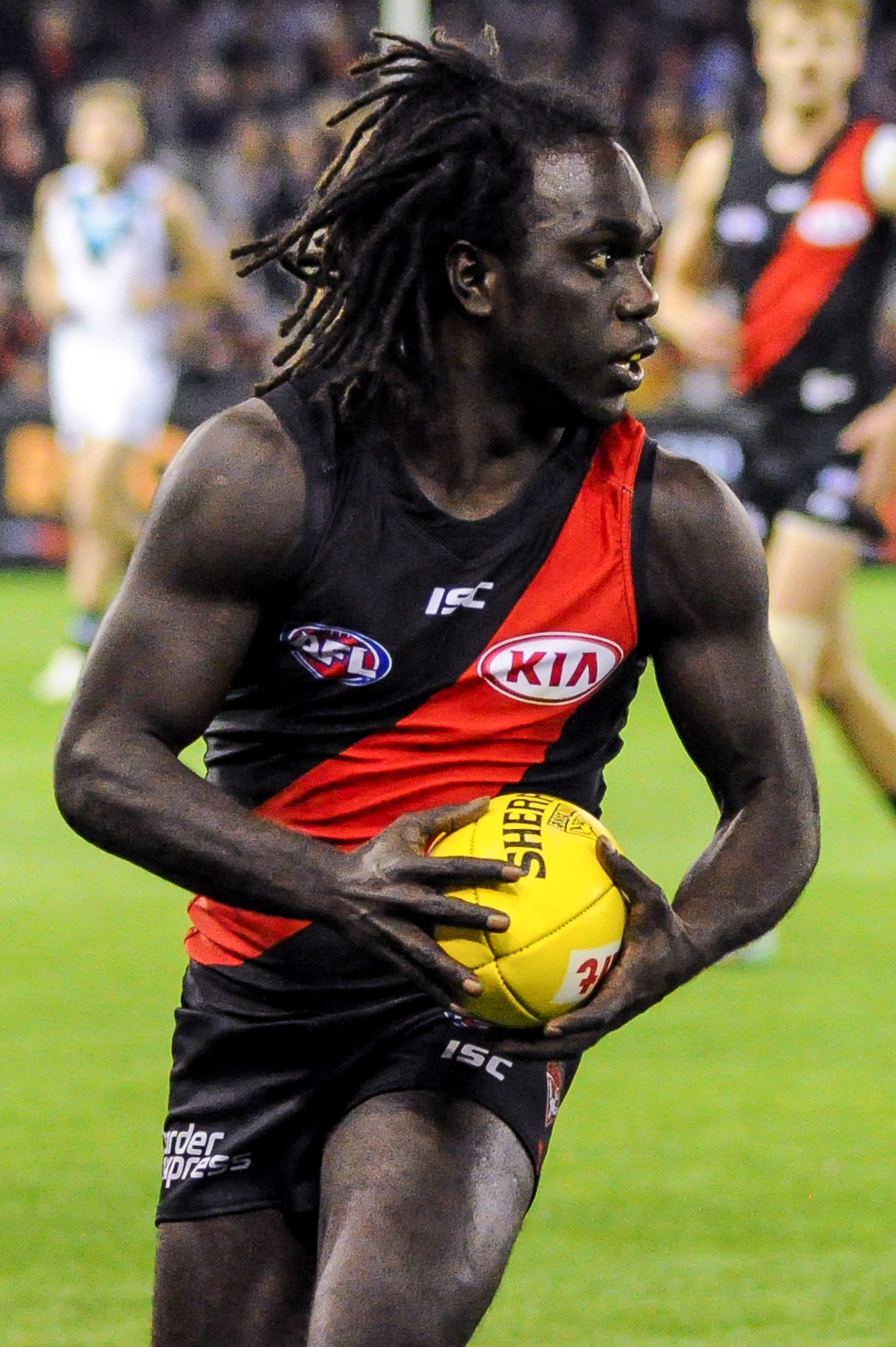
Anthony McDonald-Tipungwuti is from the Tiwi Islands

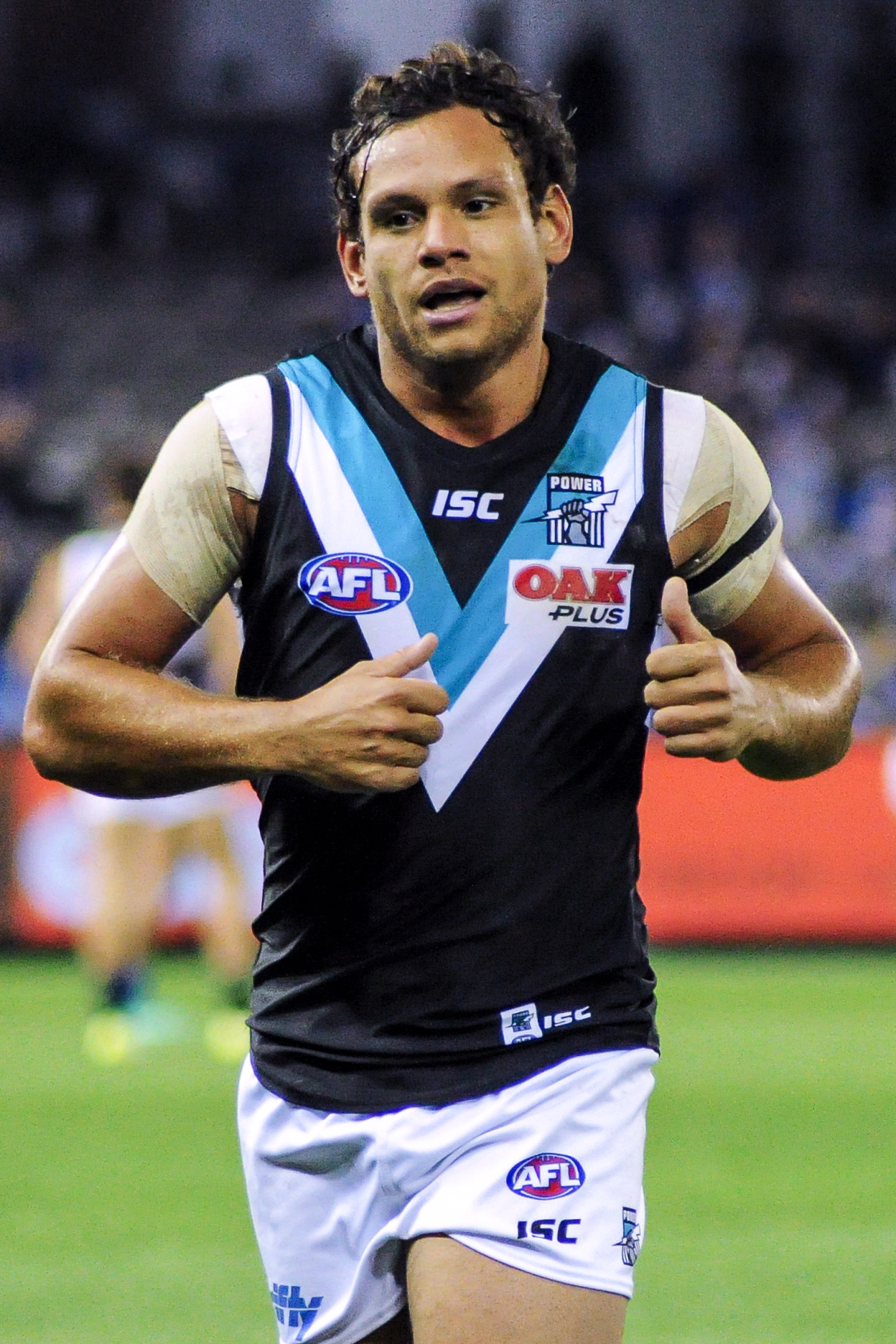
Steven Motlop is from Darwin

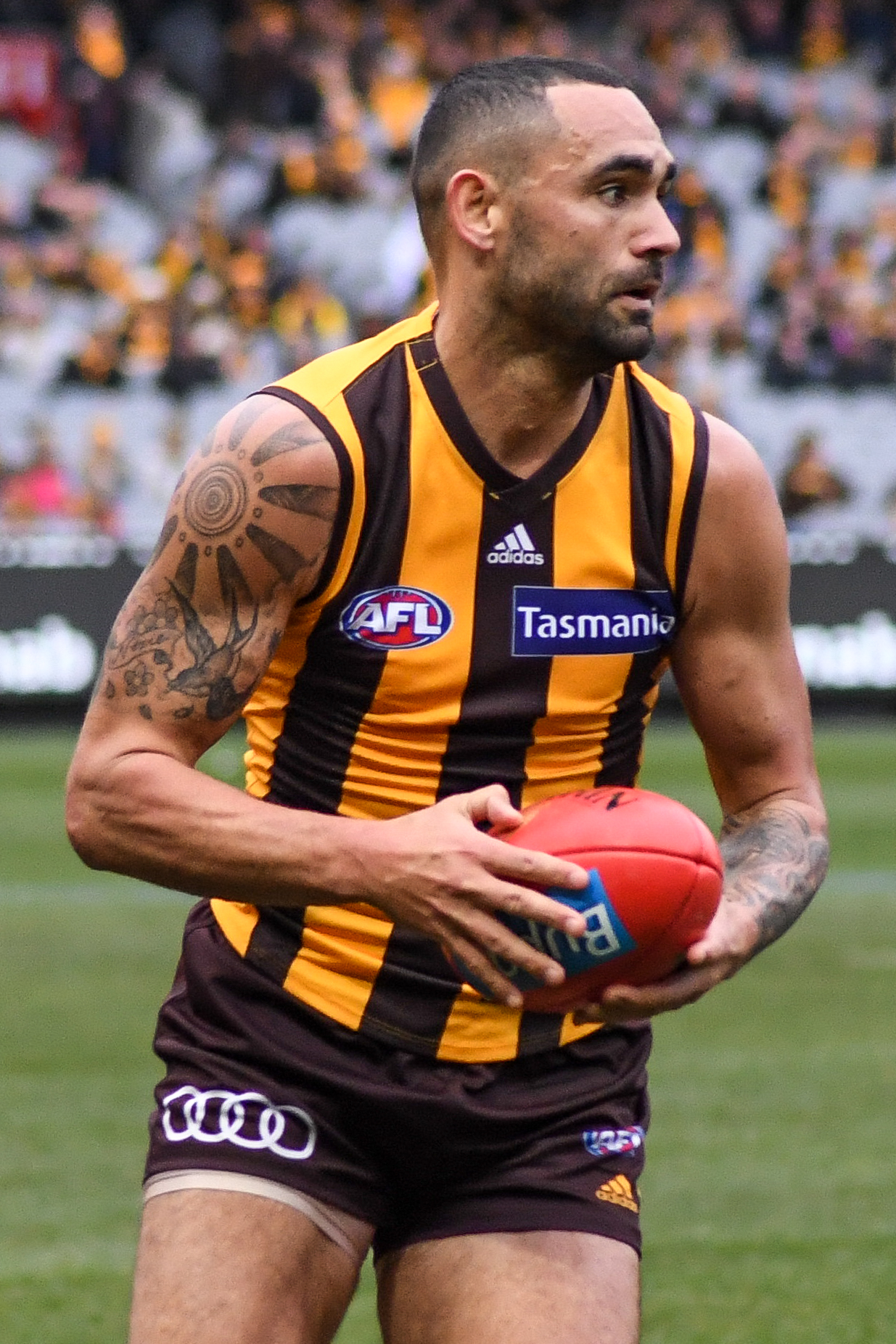
Shaun Burgoyne was born in Darwin

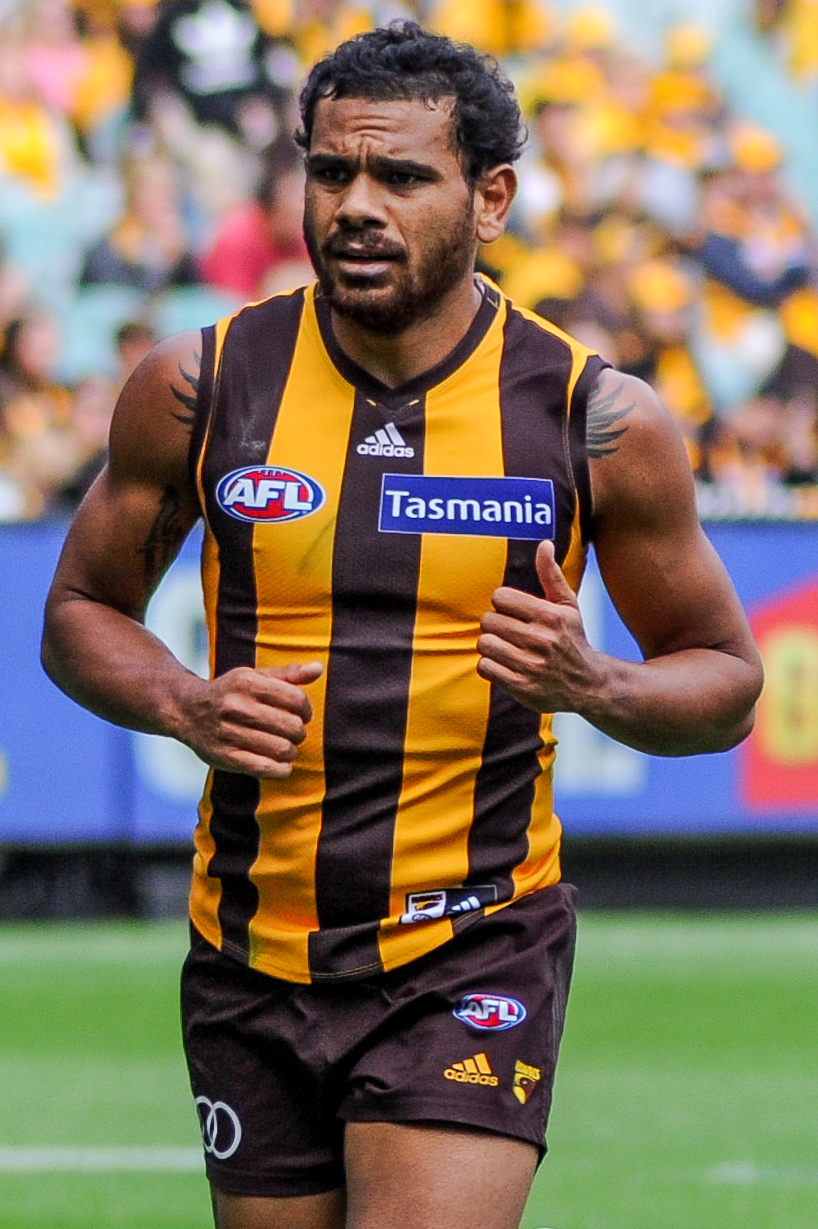
Cyril Rioli is from the Tiwi Islands

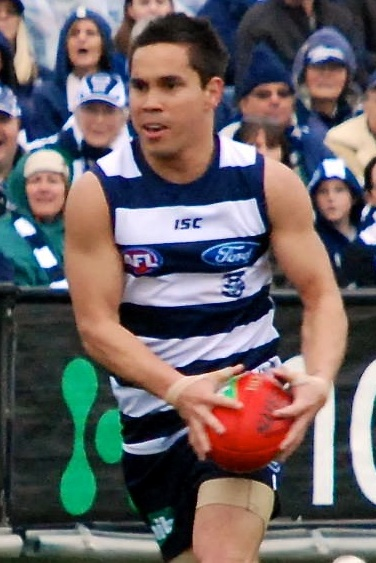
Mathew Stokes is from Darwin

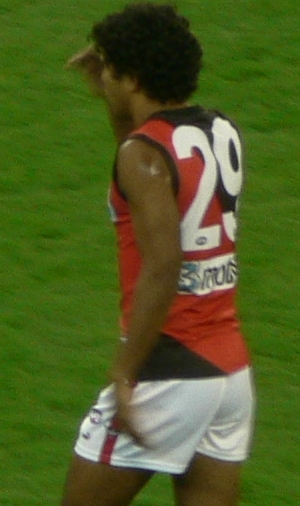
Alwyn Davey is from Darwin

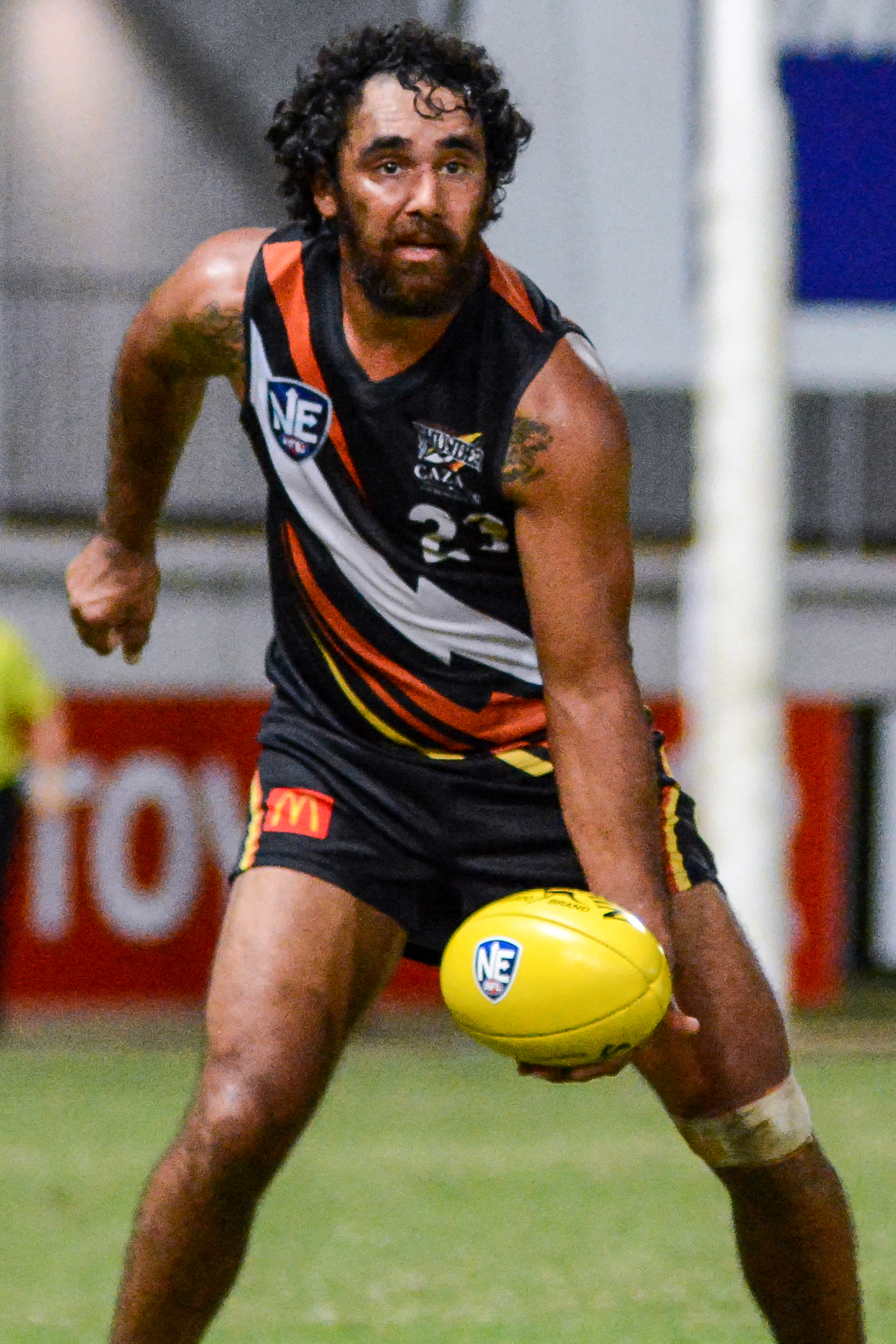
Richard Tambling is from Darwin

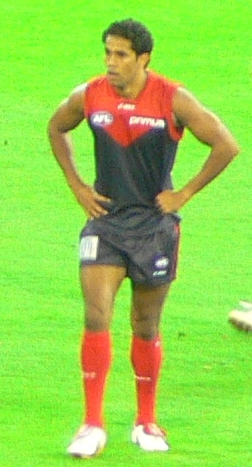
Aaron Davey is from Darwin

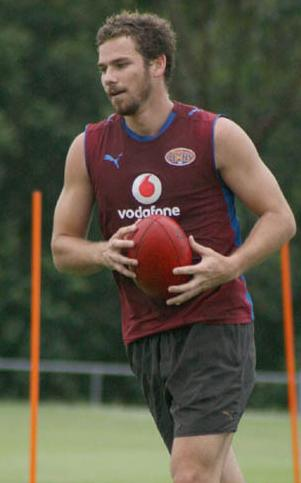
Jared Brennan is from Darwin

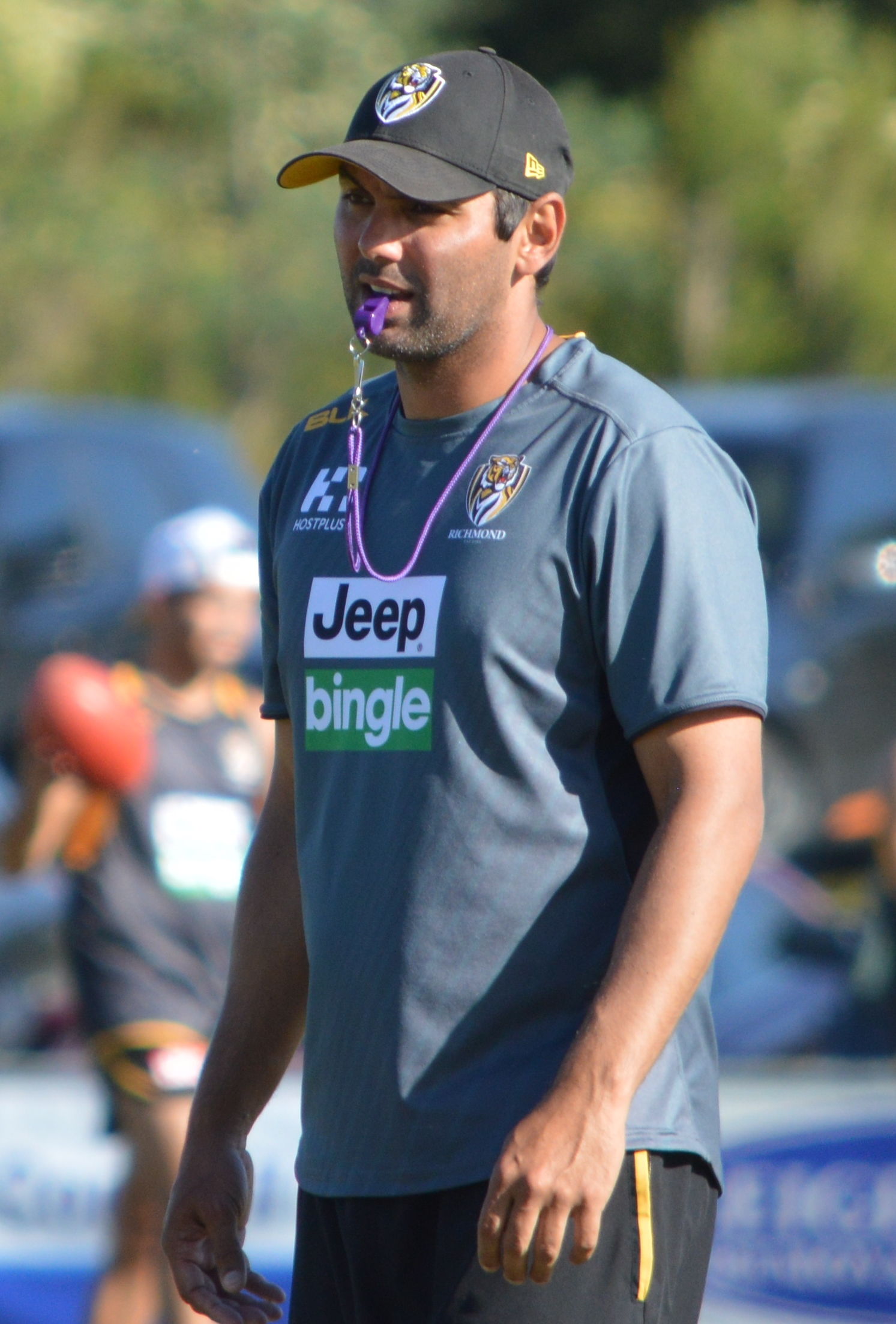
Xavier Clarke is from Darwin

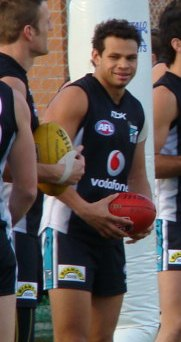
Daniel Motlop is from Darwin

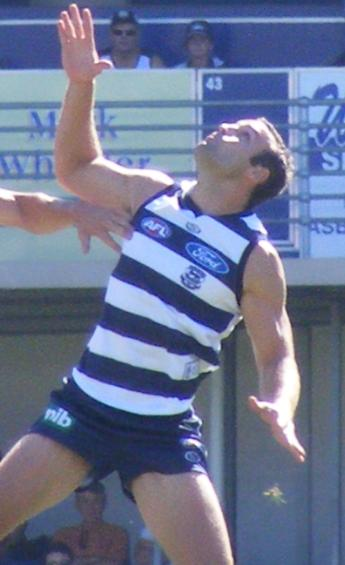
Brad Ottens was raised in Katherine

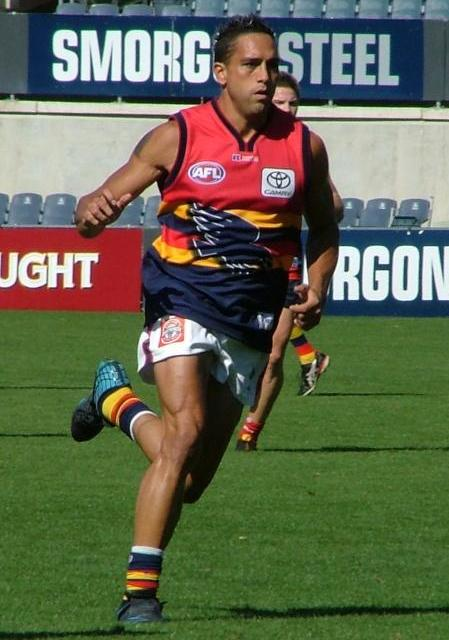
Andrew McLeod is from Darwin

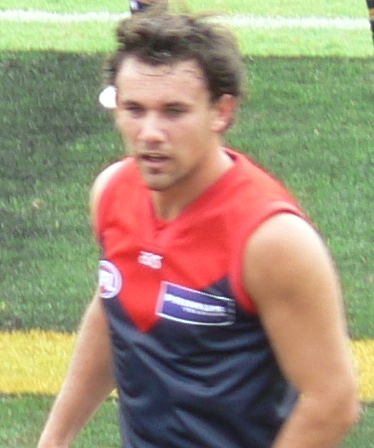
Matthew Whelan is from Darwin

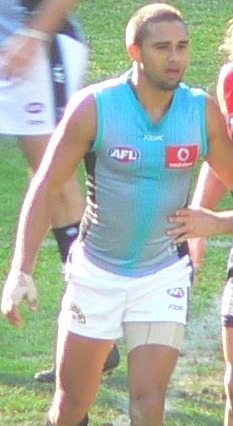
Peter Burgoyne is from Darwin

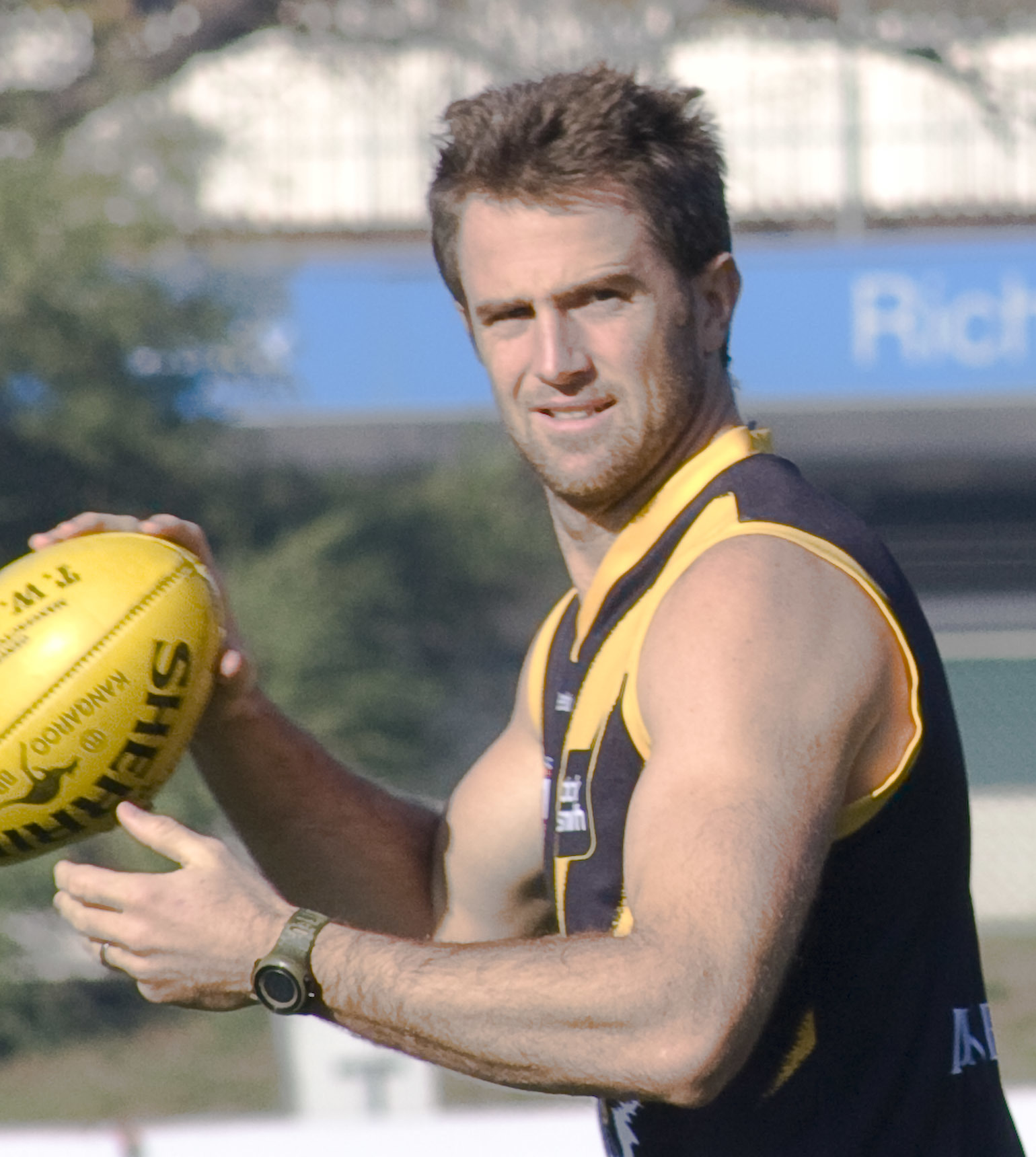
Joel Bowden lived in Alice Springs

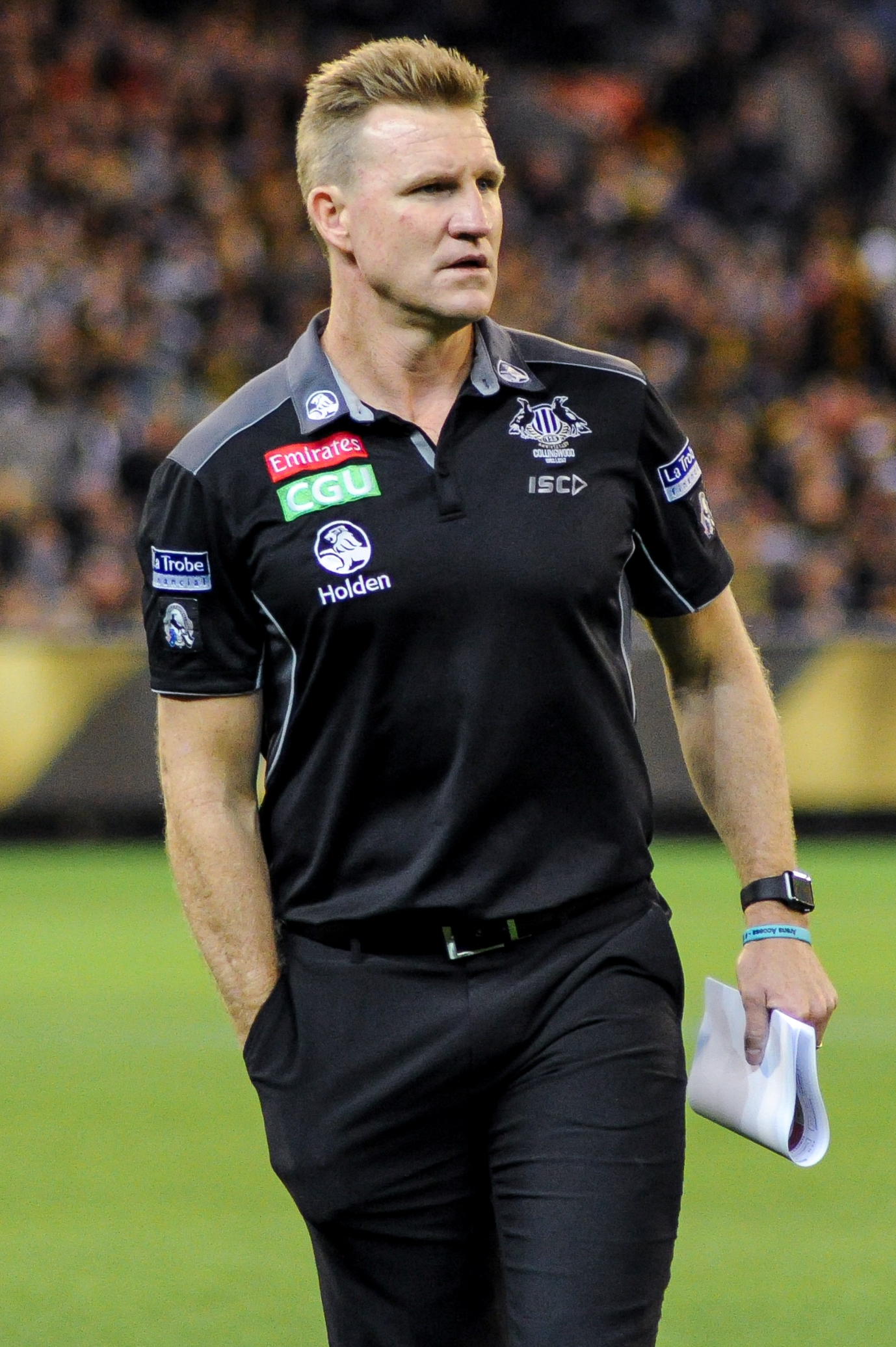
Nathan Buckley lived in Darwin

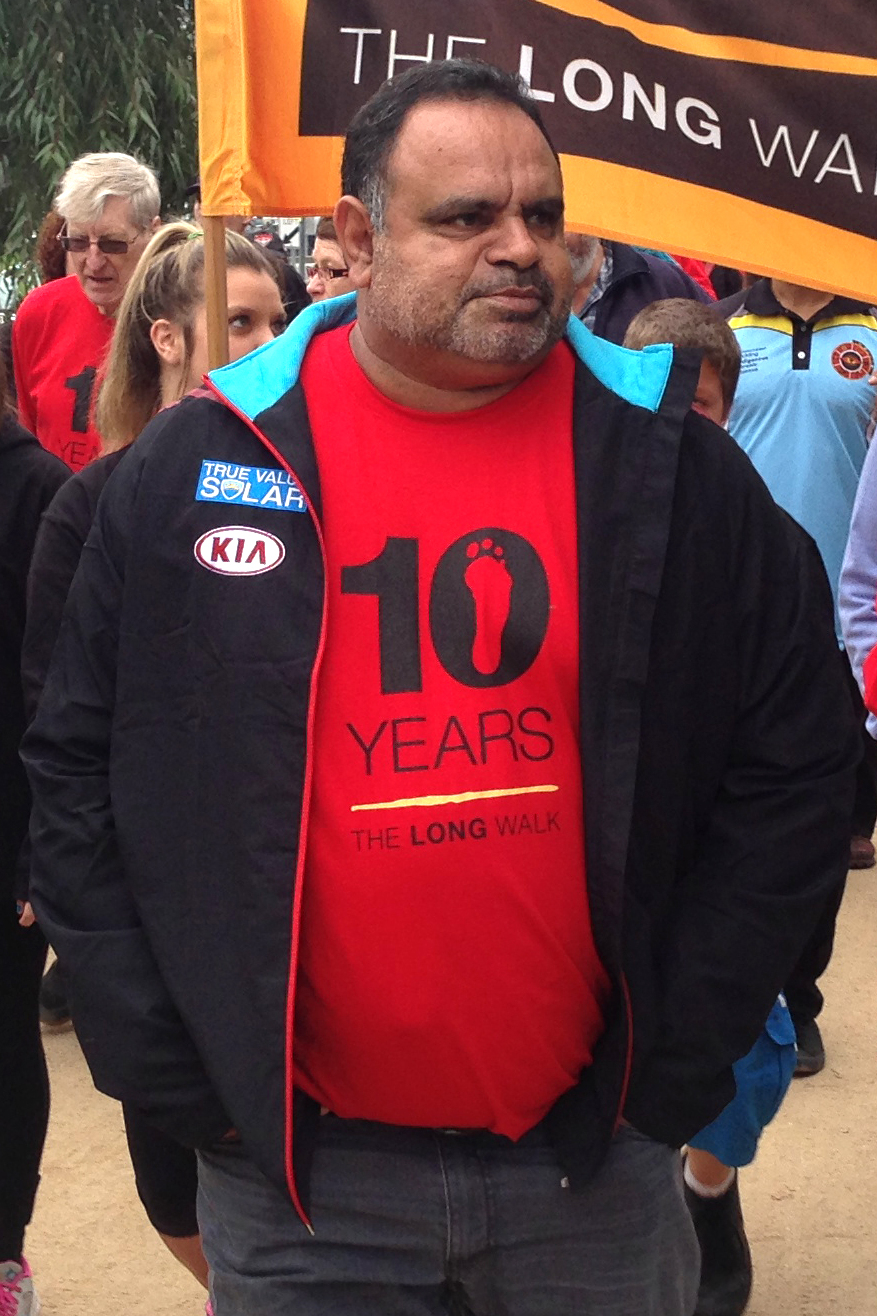
Michael Long is from the Tiwi Islands

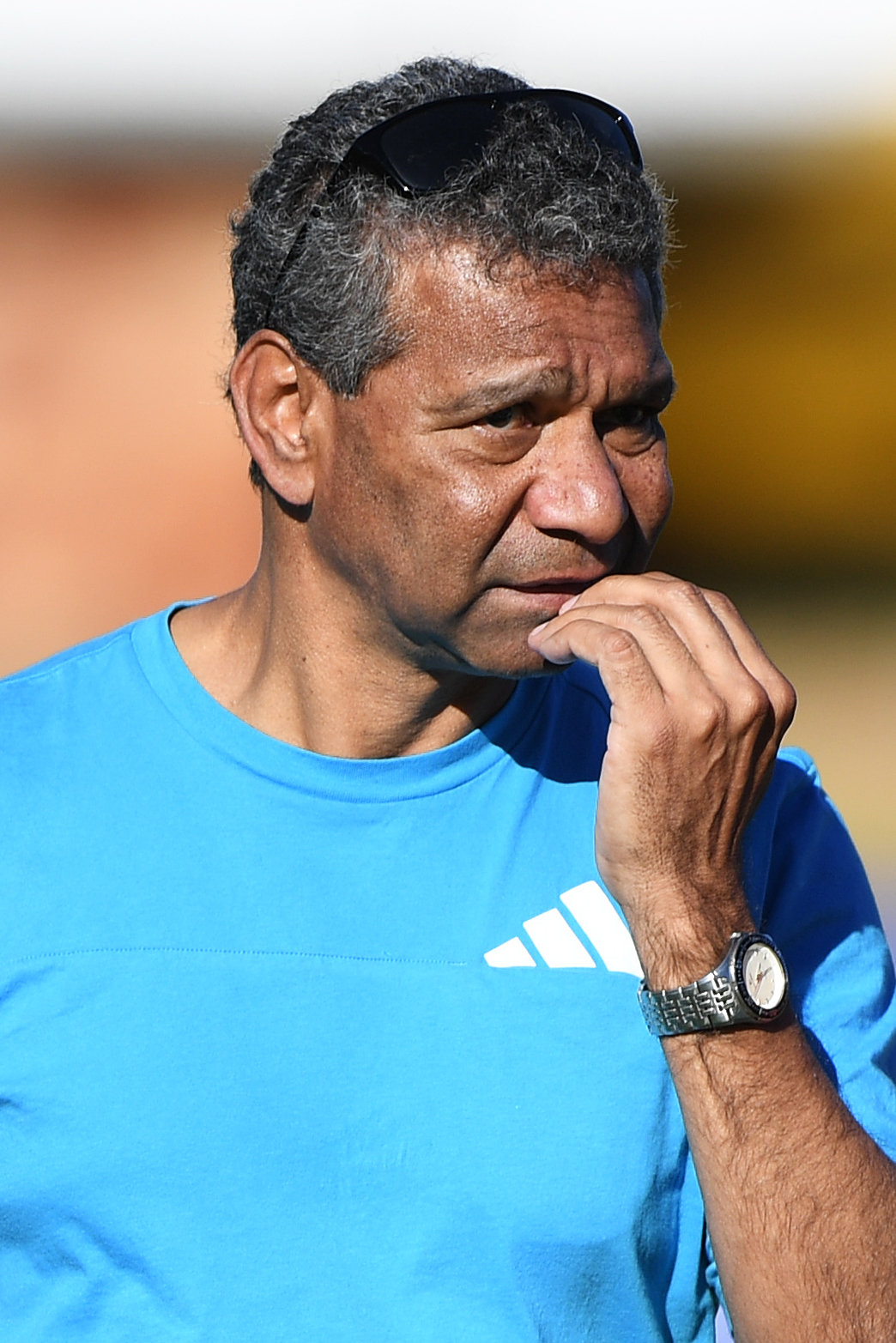
Gilbert McAdam is from Alice Springs

== Principal venues ==
Darwin	Alice Springs	Darwin
Marrara Oval	Traeger Park	Gardens Oval
Capacity: 14,000	Capacity: 10,000	Capacity: Unknown

== See also ==
- AFL Northern Territory
- Northern Territory Football League
