= List of Australian rules football clubs in the Northern Territory =

This is a list of clubs that play Australian rules football in Australia at the senior level. Guide to abbreviations:

- FC - Football Club
- AFC - Australian Football Club (mainly used if in Queensland or NSW or outside Australia) / Amateur Football Club (mainly used in the other Australian States)
- ARFC - Australian Rules Football Club

== State Level ==
=== Northern Territory Football League - Premier Division ===
Club	Colours	Nickname	Home Ground	Former League	Est.	Years in NTFL	Senior Premierships	
Club	Colours	Nickname	Home Ground	Former League	Est.	Years in NTFL	Total	Most recent
Banks		Bulldogs	Gardens Oval, The Gardens	TEAFA	1978	1978-1981, 2011-	6	2024/25
Darwin		Buffaloes	Woodroffe Oval, Woodroffe	–	1916	1917-	23	2005/06
Nightcliff		Tigers	Nightcliff Bendigo Community Bank Oval, Nightcliff	–	1950	1950-	7	2025/26
Palmerston		Magpies	Cazaly's Arena, Durack	–	1972	1972-	3	2001/02
PINT		Greenants	DXC Arena, Marrara	TEAFA	1981	2011-	2	2021/22
Southern Districts		Crocs	Norbuilt Oval, Freds Pass	–	1987	1987-	4	2024/25
St Mary's		Saints	Marrara Oval, Marrara	–	1952	1952-	34	2023/24
Tiwi		Bombers	Stanley Tipiloura Oval, Wurrumiyanga	–	2006	2007-	1	2011/12
Wanderers		Eagles	Marrara Oval, Marrara	–	1916	1916-	12	2014/15
Waratah		Warriors	Gardens Oval, The Gardens	–	1916	1916-	16	2022/23

== Metropolitan ==
=== Northern Territory Football League - other divisions ===
Club	Colours	Nickname	Home Ground	Former League	Est.	Years in NTFL	Senior Premierships	
Club	Colours	Nickname	Home Ground	Former League	Est.	Years in NTFL	Total	Most recent
Jabiru		Bombers	Brockman Oval, Jabiru	TEAFA	1982	2011-	1	2024/25
Tracy Village		Razorbacks	Tracy Village Oval, Lyons	TEAFA	1978	1978-1981, 2011-	3	2023/24

== Country ==
=== AFL Mount Isa ===
Club	Colours	Nickname	Home Ground	Est.	Years in MIAFL	MIAFL Senior Premierships	
Club	Colours	Nickname	Home Ground	Est.	Years in MIAFL	Total	Years
Lake Nash		Bulldogs	Alpurrurulam Oval, Alpurrurulam	1993	1993-	3	2002, 2003, 2025

=== Barkly Australian Football League ===
Club	Colours	Nickname	Location	Est.	Years in BAFL	Senior Premierships	
Club	Colours	Nickname	Location	Est.	Years in BAFL	Total	Years
Ali Curung		Kangaroos	Ali Curung	1956	1991-1997, 1999-2001, 2005-2016, 2019-2020, 2022, 2024-	1	2007
Ampilatwatja		Eagles	Ampilatwatja	2016	2009, 2016-2017, 2024-	0	-
Barkly Work Camp		All Stars	Barkly Work Camp, Tennant Creek	2015	2015-2019, 2021-	0	-
Elliott		Hawks	Elliott	1991	1991-2007, 2010-2012, 2014-2016, 2018-2021, 2023-	5	1999, 2003, 2005, 2023, 2024
Imangara			Imangara	2025	2025-	0	-
Jalajirrpa Mission		Warriors	Tennant Creek	2022	2022-	0	-
Soapy Bore		Crows	Soapy Bore/Arawerr	2025	2025-	1	2025
Sporties		Spitfires	Sporties Club, Tennant Creek	1991	1991-	16	1991, 1992, 1993, 1994,1996, 1998, 2001, 2002, 2010, 2014, 2015, 2016, 2017, 2019, 2020, 2021, 2022
Willowra		Double Blues	Willowra	1995	1999, 2002, 2008-2011, 2013, 2024-	0	-
YDU		Demons	Tennant Creek	2010	2009-2017, 2019-2021, 2023-	1	2024

=== Big Rivers Australian Football League ===
Club	Colours	Nickname	Home Ground	Former League	Est.	Years in BRFL	BRFL Senior Mens Premierships	
Club	Colours	Nickname	Home Ground	Former League	Est.	Years in BRFL	Total	Years
Arnhem		Crows	Phyliss Winjorrotj Oval, Barunga	–	2001	2001-2015, 2019-	6	2001, 2002, 2003, 2006, 2009, 2011
Eastside		Blues	Katherine Showgrounds, Katherine	–	1988	2018-	3	2018, 2019 2022
Garrak (Kalano 1989-?)		Bombers	Kalano Oval, Katherine	–	1980s	1989, 1997-2005, 2007-2010, 2012-2025	0	-
Gurindji		Eagles	Michael Jarparta Paddy Football Oval, Kalkarindji	KFL	1995	1995-1996, 1998-2003, 2006-2009, 2014-2017, 2021, 2024-	1	2017
Jilkminggan		Blues	Jilkminggan Oval, Jilkminggan		2001	2001-2003, 2007-2015, 2017, 2021, 2026-	0	-
Katherine		Camels	Katherine Showgrounds, Katherine	–	2010	2011-	5	2012, 2019, 2022, 2024, 2025
Katherine River		Saints	Katherine Showgrounds, Katherine	–	2025	2025-	0	-
Katherine South		Crocs	Katherine Showgrounds, Katherine	–	1990	2018-	0	-
Ngaliwurru		Lions	Max Duncan Memorial Oval, Timber Creek	–	2023	2025-	0	-
Northern Warlpiri		Mozzies	Lajamanu Oval, Lajamanu	–	1991	1992, 1995-1997, 2002-2017, 2019-	2	2005, 2008

=== Central Australian Football League ===
Club	Colours	Nickname	Location	Est.	Years in CAFL	Known CAFL Senior Premierships	
Club	Colours	Nickname	Location	Est.	Years in CAFL	Total	Years
Arlparra		Dockers	Utopia		2023-2024	0	-
Eastern Plenty (Plenty Highway 2016-22)		Swans	Hart Range		2016-2022, 2024-	0	-
Federal		Demons	Alice Springs	1947	1947-	15	1950, 1955, 1958, 1959, 1960, 1961, 1962, 1963, 1974, 2011, 2013, 2015, 2016, 2023, 2025
Ltyentye Apurte		Eagles	Ltyente Apurte Community		2008-	3	2017 (CL), 2019 (CL), 2020
Laramba (Anmatjere 2008-13)		Roos	Laramba		2008-2021, 2024-	6	2014, 2015*, 2016*, 2017 (CC), 2018 (CC), 2025
Mt Allan		Eagles	Yuelamu		2019-	1	2022
Papunya		Eagles	Papunya	1960s	2008, 2020-	3	2021, 2023, 2024
Pioneer		Eagles	Alice Springs	1947	1947-	33	1947, 1948, 1949, 1951, 1953, 1956, 1957, 1965, 1966, 1967, 1968, 1969, 1971, 1972, 1975, 1976, 1977, 1981, 1983, 1985, 1987, 1989, 1990, 1991, 1994, 1997, 1998, 2000, 2001, 2009, 2010, 2022, 2024
Rovers		Double Blues	Alice Springs	1947	1947-	14	1952, 1954, 1964, 1973, 1978, 1986, 1988, 1996, 2012, 2017, 2018, 2019, 2020, 2021
South Alice Springs (Amoonguna 1962-70)		Kangaroos	Alice Springs	1962	1962-	7	1984, 1992, 1993, 1995, 1999, 2003, 2014
Ti Tree		Roosters	Ti-Tree		2015-2021, 2023-	0	-
Utju (Areyonga 2011-22)		Tigers	Areyonga	1960s	2011-2023, 2025-	1	2014*
West Alice Springs (Melanka 1970-72)		Bloods	Alice Springs	1970	1970-	8	1979, 1980, 1982, 2002, 2004, 2005, 2006, 2007
Western Aranda (Hermannsburg 2009-10)		Bulldogs	Hermannsburg		2013-	1	2016
Yuendumu		Magpies	Yuendumu	1959	2008-2010, 2015-	2	2008, 2015

=== Gove Australian Football League ===
Club	Colours	Nickname	Home Ground/Location	Est.	Years in GAFL	GAFL Premierships	
Club	Colours	Nickname	Home Ground/Location	Est.	Years in GAFL	Total	Years
Baywara		Power	Gunyangara Oval, Gunyangara		2007-2008, 2010-2016, 2018-	1	2007
Djarrak		Hawks	Yirrkala Oval, Yirrkala	1973	1975-1993, 1996-	7	1975, 1980, 1981, 2000, 2009, 2015, 2017
Gopu		Tuna	Gunyangara Oval, Gunyangara	1973	1975-	14	1994, 1995, 1996, 1998, 2001, 2002, 2008, 2010, 2011, 2012, 2020, 2022, 2024, 2025
Nguykal		King Fish	Yirrkala Oval, Yirrkala	2001	2002-	7	2003, 2013, 2014, 2016, 2018, 2019, 2021
Nhulunbuy		Saints	Hindle Oval, Nhulunbuy	1998	1998-2012, 2016-2017, 2020-	5	1999, 2004, 2005, 2006, 2023

=== Tiwi Islands Football League ===
Club	Colours	Nickname	Home Ground	Est.	Years in TIFL	TIFL Senior Premierships	
Club	Colours	Nickname	Home Ground	Est.	Years in TIFL	Total	Years
Imalu (Garden Point 1969-70)		Tigers	Pirlangimpi Oval, Pirlangimpi	1960s	1969/70-	18	1972/73, 1973/74, 1978/79, 1980/81, 1981/82, 1983/84, 1984/85, 1988/89, 1990/91, 1991/92, 1992/93, 1993/94, 1995/96, 1998/99, 2007/08, 2010/11, 2012/13, 2025
Jikilarruwu (Tikilaru 2017)		Dockers	Stanley Tipiloura Oval, Wurrumiyanga	2017-	2017/18-	1	2017/18
Muluwurri (Snake Bay 1969-1971; Milikapiti 1971-1975, Taracumbie ???)		Magpie Geese	Milikapiti Oval, Milikapiti	1960s	1969/70-	3	2006/07, 2015/16, 2016/17
Pumaralli		Thunder & Lightning	Stanley Tipiloura Oval, Wurrumiyanga	1960s	1969/70-	7	1969/70, 1975/76, 1977/78, 1979/80, 1999/2000, 2002/03, 2005/06
Ranku (Warankuwu 1993-98)		Eagles	Stanley Tipiloura Oval, Wurrumiyanga	1993	1993/94-	2	2000/01, 2018/19, 2024
Tapalinga		Superstars	Stanley Tipiloura Oval, Wurrumiyanga	1960s	1969/70-	11	1970/71, 1976/77, 1982/83, 1985/86, 1986/87, 1987/88, 1990/91, 1997/98, 2003/04, 2008/09, 2009/10
Tuyu		Buffaloes	Stanley Tipiloura Oval, Wurrumiyanga	1960s	1969/70-	7	1974/75, 1994/95, 2001/02, 2004/05, 2011/12, 2014/15, 2022/23
Walama (Irrimanu 1970-2005)		Bulldogs	Stanley Tipiloura Oval, Wurrumiyanga	1970	1971/72-	3	1971/72, 1996/97, 2014/15
