= Tiwi Islands Football League =

- Formerly: Nguilla Football League
- Sport: Australian rules football
- Founded: 1968
- Organising body: Tiwi Football Commission
- No. of teams: 8
- Country: Australia
- Most recent champion: Imalu Tigers
- Most titles: Imalu Tigers (18)

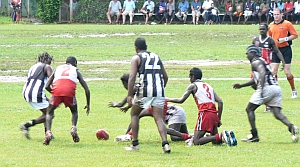
Action from the 2005 TIFL Grand Final between Pumarali (red and white) and Muluwurri (black and white).

The Tiwi Islands Football League (founded as the Nguilla Football League in 1968 and renamed in 1990) is an Australian rules football competition in the Tiwi Islands, Northern Territory, Australia.

Australian Rules football is the most popular sport on the Tiwi Islands. The Tiwi Islands Grand Final is an event held in March each year that attracts up to 3,000 spectators and is a tourist attraction for the Northern Territory. The Tiwi Australian Football League has 900 participants out of a community of about 2600, the highest football participation rate in Australia (35%). Tiwi footballers are renowned for exquisite one touch skills. Many of the players have a preference for participating barefoot. Many of the male players also play for the St Mary's Football Club in Darwin's Northern Territory Football League. The Grand Final of the TIFL was broadcast on ABC Northern Territory until 2012.

== Clubs ==
Club	Colours	Nickname	Home Ground	Est.	Years in TIFL	TIFL Senior Premierships	
Club	Colours	Nickname	Home Ground	Est.	Years in TIFL	Total	Years
Imalu (Garden Point 1969-70)		Tigers	Pirlangimpi Oval, Pirlangimpi	1960s	1969/70-	18	1972/73, 1973/74, 1978/79, 1980/81, 1981/82, 1983/84, 1984/85, 1988/89, 1990/91, 1991/92, 1992/93, 1993/94, 1995/96, 1998/99, 2007/08, 2010/11, 2012/13, 2025,
Jikilarruwu (Tikilaru 2017)		Dockers	Stanley Tipiloura Oval, Wurrumiyanga	2017-	2017/18-	1	2017/18
Muluwurri (Snake Bay 1969-1971; Milikapiti 1971-1975, Taracumbie ???)		Magpie Geese	Milikapiti Oval, Milikapiti	1960s	1969/70-	3	2006/07, 2015/16, 2016/17
Pumaralli		Thunder & Lightning	Stanley Tipiloura Oval, Wurrumiyanga	1960s	1969/70-	7	1969/70, 1975/76, 1977/78, 1979/80, 1999/2000, 2002/03, 2005/06
Ranku (Warankuwu 1993-98)		Eagles	Stanley Tipiloura Oval, Wurrumiyanga	1993	1993/94-	2	2000/01, 2018/19, 2024
Tapalinga		Superstars	Stanley Tipiloura Oval, Wurrumiyanga	1960s	1969/70-	11	1970/71, 1976/77, 1982/83, 1985/86, 1986/87, 1987/88, 1990/91, 1997/98, 2003/04, 2008/09, 2009/10
Tuyu		Buffaloes	Stanley Tipiloura Oval, Wurrumiyanga	1960s	1969/70-	7	1974/75, 1994/95, 2001/02, 2004/05, 2011/12, 2014/15, 2022/23
Walama (Irrimanu 1970-2005)		Bulldogs	Stanley Tipiloura Oval, Wurrumiyanga	1970	1971/72-	3	1971/72, 1996/97, 2014/15

=== Former clubs ===
Club	Colours	Nickname	Home Ground	Former league	Est.	Years in TIFL	TIFL Senior Premierships		Fate
Club	Colours	Nickname	Home Ground	Former league	Est.	Years in TIFL	Total	Years	Fate
Melville Island		Kangaroos	Stanley Tipiloura Oval, Wurrumiyanga	–	2012	2012-2013	0	-	Folded after 2013 season
Nguiu		Brumbies	Stanley Tipiloura Oval, Wurrumiyanga	–	1993	1993-2000	0	-	Folded after 2000 season
Wadeye		Magic		NTFL	2011	2014	0	-	Folded after 2014 season

== History ==
Br. John Pye and Br. Andy Howley introduced Australian rules football to Bathurst and Melville islands in 1941.

The locals quickly took to the game and the first dedicated ground was built in 1942.

In 1944, the first games consisting of a full complement of 18 players and matches according to the rule book were played.

By the end of the decade, football was the Tiwi's No.1 sport.

In 1954, the St Mary's Football Club began enlisting Tiwi servicemen, and in the following year with the assistance of a majority of Tiwi players won the NTFL premiership.

Within a couple of decades, the major Australian leagues began to take an interest with the first player offered a contract being Joe Saturninas in 1955.

In the 1960s, the most talented export of the TIFL, ruckman David Kantilla had a successful career first in the NTFL, and then reached its peak when he later became a leading player in the South Australian National Football League (SANFL) with South Adelaide Football Club, where he was a member of the 1964 premiership team, and won the best and fairest and leading goal kicking awards at the club. The Tiwi Island league's top goalkicking award was later named after him.

The Nguilla Football League was founded in 1968 with five member clubs.

The 1969/1970 Wet Season saw the first season of the TIFL, with 5 teams competing: Pumarali, Tapalinga, Imalu, Tuyu and Irrimaru.

From 1980 to 1981, Tiwi Islander Maurice Rioli won two Simpson Medals for Western Australian Football League (WAFL) club South Fremantle as best player in WAFL Grand Finals before his recruitment by Victorian Football League (VFL) in 1982, where he won the Norm Smith Medal for the best player in the 1982 VFL Grand Final. Michael Long would later also win a Norm Smith Medal, in 1993. Other Tiwi Islanders in the AFL include Adam Kerinaiua, who played three games for the Brisbane Bears in 1992 and Malcolm Lynch, who played two games for the Western Bulldogs. Although these players were not from the TIFL, the success of these players in the elite Australian competition did much to boost the popularity of Australian Rules amongst the local Tiwi Islanders.

The league was renamed Tiwi Islands Football League in 1990.

In 2006, it was announced that a Tiwi Bombers Football Club would join the Northern Territory Football League initially known as the "Super Tiwis". The team began 2006 season as the "Tiwi Bombers".

== Notable players ==
Many players playing for the Tiwi Islands Football League have also played for St Mary's Football club, as well as the AFL. Some of these players include the Rioli family.

== See also ==
- AFL Northern Territory
- Northern Territory Football League
- Australian rules football in the Northern Territory
