= CAFL =

CAFL may refer to:

- Central Australian Football League, Australian rules football competition
- China Arena Football League, arena football league
