= Bathurst Island (Northern Territory) =

Island in the Northern Territory, Australia

Native name: Nguyu
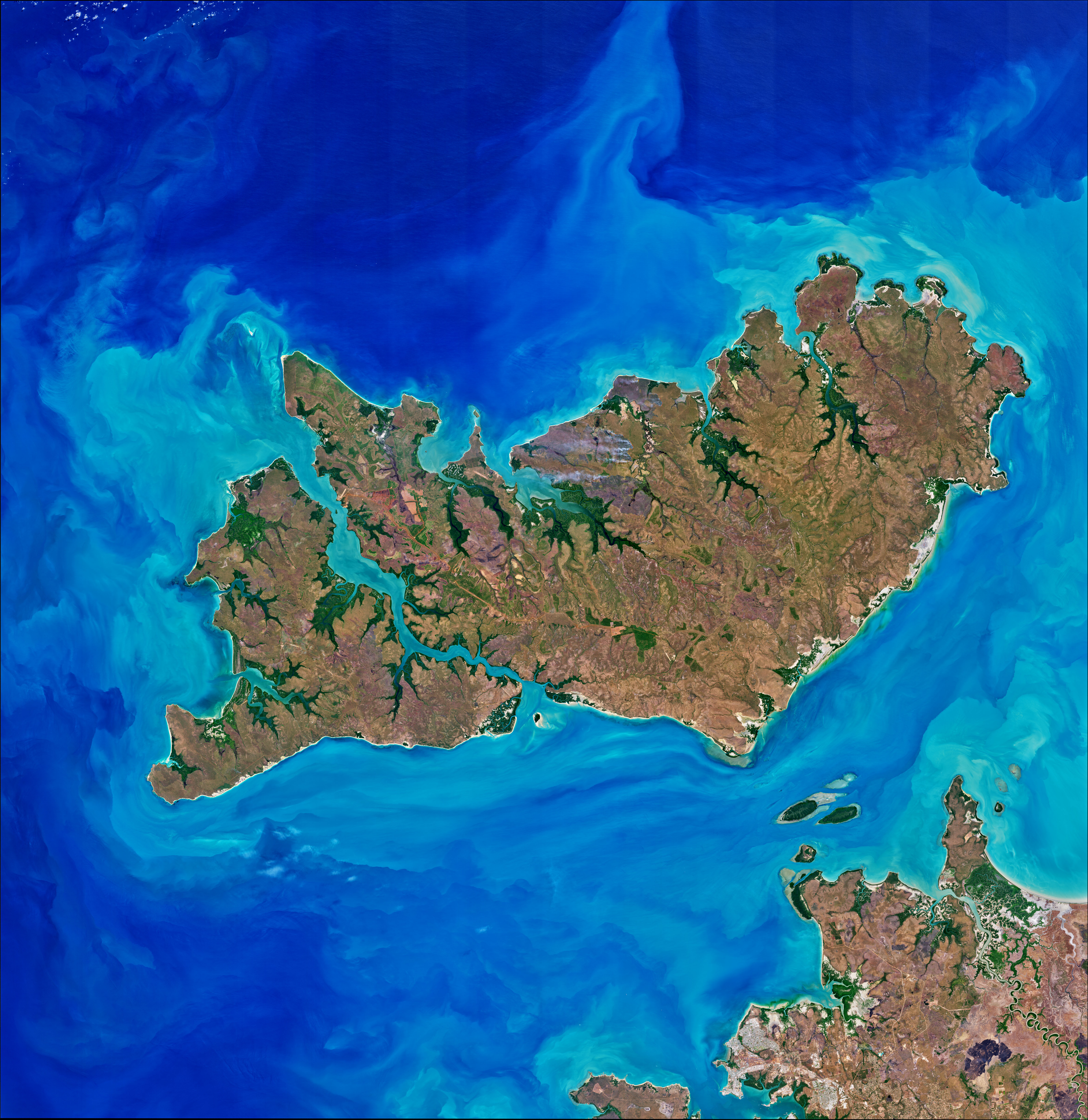
- Satellite image of the Tiwi Islands, Melville (top right) and Bathurst (left) with the Australian mainland (bottom right)

- Location within Northern Territory

Geography
- Location: Timor Sea
- Coordinates: 11°35′S 130°18′E
- Archipelago: Tiwi Islands
- Major islands: Bathurst, Buchanan
- Area: 2,600 km^{2} (1,000 sq mi)

Administration
- Australia
- Territory: Northern Territory
- Largest settlement: Wurrumiyanga (pop. 1563)

Demographics
- Population: ca. 1640
- Pop. density: 0.63/km^{2} (1.63/sq mi)

Bathurst Island (Iwaidja: Nguyu) (2,600 km^{2} or 1,000 sq mi, 11°35′S 130°18′E) is one of the Tiwi Islands in the Northern Territory off the northern coast of Australia along with Melville Island.

== Description ==
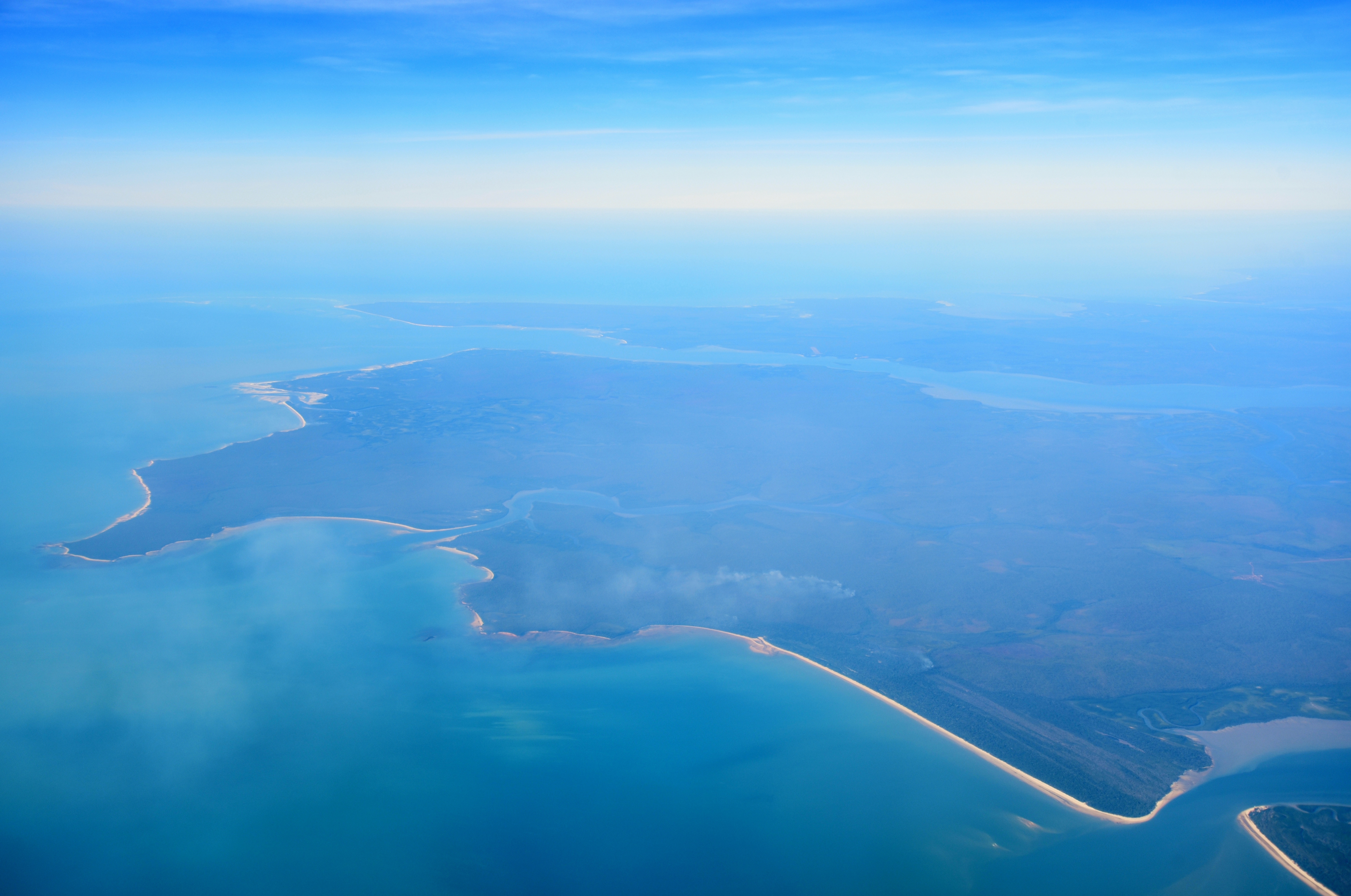
Aerial photograph of the northern part of the island in 2023

The largest settlement on Bathurst is Wurrumiyanga (known as Nguiu until 2010), in the south-east, with a population of around 1,560. Located on the south east corner of Bathurst Island, Wurrumiyanga is approximately 70 km (43 mi) north of Darwin. The second largest settlement is Wurakuwu, with a population of 50, located 60 km (37 mi) northwest of Wurrumiyanga. The third settlement on the island is a small family outstation called 4 Mile Camp, about 6 km (3.7 mi) west of Wurrumiyanga.

== History ==
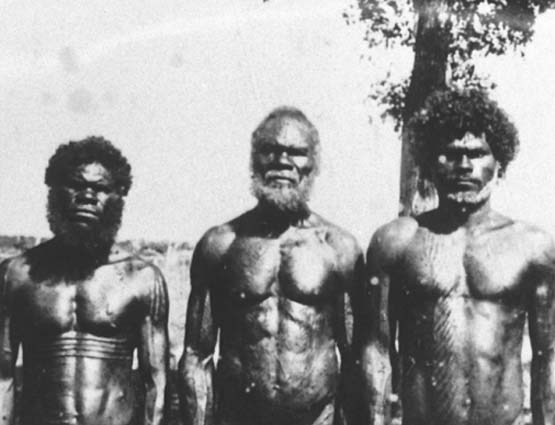
Tiwi people in Bathurst Island

Aboriginal Australians have occupied the area that became the Tiwi Islands for at least 40,000 years.

On 5 May 1623, Willem Joostzoon Van Colster (or Coolsteerdt), in the ship Arnhem, named the island De Speult Eylandt, in honour of Herman van Speult, Governor of Ambon, who had commissioned the voyage of exploration.

In 1828, the island was named Bathurst Island by Scottish explorer John Clements Wickham, after the explorer Phillip Parker King's ship which had explored the area in August 1821. He named the island during a voyage in March 1838 when he was second in command of HMS Beagle in Charles Darwin's expedition. The ship's name honours Henry Bathurst, 3rd Earl Bathurst, (1762-1834), former British Secretary of State for the Colonies.

From 1910 to 1938 the island was the site of the Roman Catholic mission of Francis Xavier Gsell, known as the "Bishop with 150 wives" for his practice of "buying" girls betrothed to older men, thus making it possible for them to marry men of their own age.

On 24 December 1912 the whole island was proclaimed an Aboriginal reserve, under the Northern Territory Aboriginals Act 1910. A series of documents show that previous to the proclamation (published in the Commonwealth Gazette on 18 January 1913), there had been discussion about two parcels of land on the island. One was the allocation of 10,000 acres (4,000 ha) allocated to the Mission, which would continue on annual leases, and the second regarding 10,000 acres (4,000 ha) which was previously allocated as Crown Land under the Northern Territory Tropical Products Act 1904, for the production of cotton and other tropical crops. The correspondence shows that this was decided to be undesirable from the point of view of the Aboriginal people, both because of the bad influence of white men and the need to import labour to use on the leases.

Before the bombing of Darwin, a Missionary of the Sacred Heart priest, Ed Bennett, saw the approaching Japanese bombers, and urged the resident coastwatcher, John Gribble, to send a warning to Darwin, but Gribble refused. He said it would have to be sent in code, and he did not have the relevant code books. The first wave of 188 Japanese planes was also spotted by another missionary on the island, Father John McGrath, who sent a message on the radio saying "An unusually large air formation [is] bearing down on us from the northwest". However, ten US P-40E Kittyhawk fighters were returning to Darwin after aborting a mission to Timor due to bad weather, and the Australian duty officer assumed this was the same formation, and the warning was not acted upon.

== Climate ==
Bathurst Island has a tropical savanna climate (Köppen: Aw) with a very hot, rainy season from mid-October to April and a relatively cool, dry season from May to mid-October.

Climate data for Point Fawcett (11º46'S, 130º02'E, 7 m AMSL) (1997-2024 normals and extremes)
Month	Jan	Feb	Mar	Apr	May	Jun	Jul	Aug	Sep	Oct	Nov	Dec	Year
Record high °C (°F)	35.5 (95.9)	34.7 (94.5)	34.5 (94.1)	35.3 (95.5)	35.4 (95.7)	34.4 (93.9)	33.8 (92.8)	34.9 (94.8)	36.9 (98.4)	36.5 (97.7)	36.3 (97.3)	36.5 (97.7)	36.9 (98.4)
Mean daily maximum °C (°F)	31.8 (89.2)	31.7 (89.1)	31.9 (89.4)	32.4 (90.3)	31.6 (88.9)	30.1 (86.2)	30.2 (86.4)	31.2 (88.2)	32.3 (90.1)	33.1 (91.6)	33.4 (92.1)	32.7 (90.9)	31.9 (89.4)
Mean daily minimum °C (°F)	25.8 (78.4)	25.7 (78.3)	25.1 (77.2)	23.6 (74.5)	21.1 (70.0)	18.8 (65.8)	18.0 (64.4)	18.4 (65.1)	21.1 (70.0)	23.6 (74.5)	25.0 (77.0)	25.7 (78.3)	22.7 (72.8)
Record low °C (°F)	21.8 (71.2)	21.9 (71.4)	20.0 (68.0)	16.5 (61.7)	12.0 (53.6)	8.2 (46.8)	9.8 (49.6)	10.2 (50.4)	12.6 (54.7)	17.1 (62.8)	20.2 (68.4)	21.9 (71.4)	8.2 (46.8)
Average precipitation mm (inches)	338.5 (13.33)	267.5 (10.53)	246.7 (9.71)	133.1 (5.24)	31.2 (1.23)	6.7 (0.26)	0.4 (0.02)	1.4 (0.06)	10.0 (0.39)	67.2 (2.65)	126.7 (4.99)	295.3 (11.63)	1,530.1 (60.24)
Average precipitation days (≥ 1.0 mm)	15.2	13.0	12.9	8.0	2.7	0.7	0.1	0.2	1.3	5.3	8.0	13.3	80.7
Average afternoon relative humidity (%)	75	76	72	64	54	49	47	46	54	59	66	72	61
Average dew point °C (°F)	25.1 (77.2)	25.0 (77.0)	24.5 (76.1)	22.6 (72.7)	19.5 (67.1)	16.5 (61.7)	16.0 (60.8)	16.0 (60.8)	19.9 (67.8)	22.3 (72.1)	24.0 (75.2)	24.8 (76.6)	21.3 (70.4)
Source: Bureau of Meteorology

== In film ==
Bathurst Island was depicted as Mission Island in the 2008 Baz Luhrmann film Australia. In the film, Japanese infantrymen land on the island; however, the presence of Japanese troops on the island is entirely fictional, as no Japanese landing occurred there during World War II.

== Notable people ==
- David Kantilla
- Olive May Pearce
