= Tayla Thorn =

Australian rules footballer (born 1998)

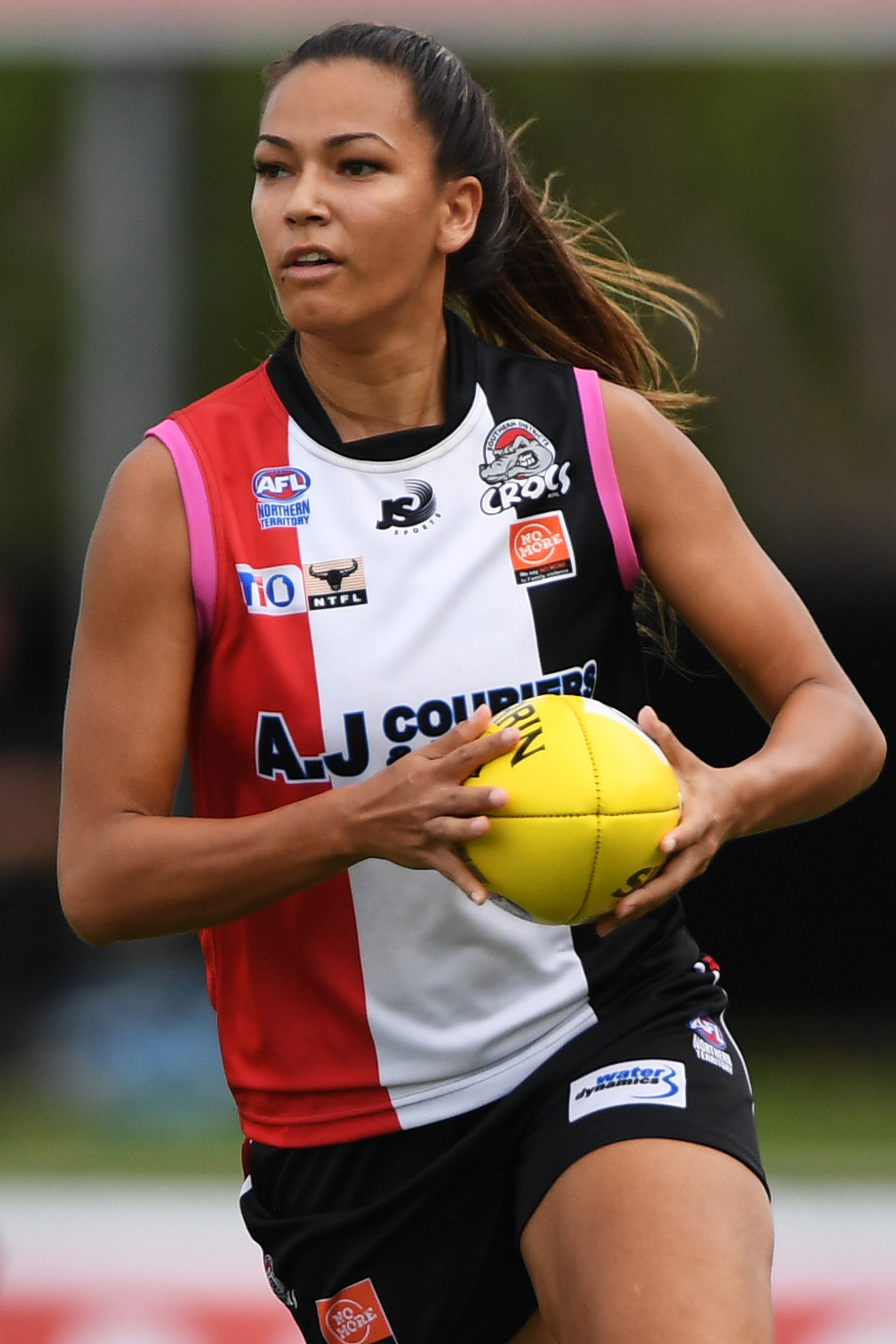
- Thorn playing for Southern Districts in November 2019

Personal information
- Nickname: Thorny
- Born: 31 May 1998 (age 28); Darwin, Northern Territory
- Original team: Southern District (NTFL)
- Draft: No. 90, 2016 AFL Women's draft
- Debut: Round 1, 2017, Adelaide vs. Greater Western Sydney, at Thebarton Oval
- Height: 174 cm (5 ft 9 in)
- Position: Utility

Playing career^{1}
Years	Club	Games (Goals)
2017	Adelaide	5 (0)
2020	Gold Coast	3 (0)
Total		8 (0)
- ^{1} Playing statistics correct to the end of the 2020 season.

Career highlights
- Junior: Northern Territory Under-18 captain; AFL Youth Girls All Star

Tayla Thorn (born 31 May 1998) is an Australian rules footballer who played for Adelaide and Gold Coast in the AFL Women's (AFLW).

== Early life ==
Thorn was born in Darwin, Northern Territory to a family of Indigenous Australian (Iwaidja) descent. She was raised in the small town of Humpty Doo, playing football with cousin Nakia Cockatoo and others. She was captain of the first Indigenous Northern Territory representative side, and won a "best and fairest" award at her home club, St Mary's. In September 2016, Thorn was one of only two Northern Territory players selected in the women's all star exhibition match at the Whitten Oval, when she played for Melbourne. That same year, she was named in the Youth Girls All-Stars Team.

== AFL Women's career ==
=== Adelaide ===
Thorn was drafted by Adelaide with the club's twelfth pick in the 2016 AFL Women's draft. Thorn had previously moved to Melbourne to study accounting, and returned to the Top End to join the Darwin group of Adelaide players. She was the youngest player in the Crows' inaugural AFLW team. Thorn made her debut in the club's inaugural match, in round 1 of 2017 against Greater Western Sydney. After playing in ruck and defence in her debut, she impressed the club with her effective tagging against Western Bulldogs marquee player Katie Brennan in round 2. Thorn was omitted in round 5, but returned in round 6 to play against Melbourne in front of her home crowd at TIO Stadium in Darwin. Despite missing two rounds, she was one of the leading tacklers in the league. Thorn was not re-signed during the 2017 trade period.

=== Gold Coast ===
In August 2019 she signed with the next expansion team, Gold Coast. At the end of the season, she was delisted.

== Personal life ==
She has a large family, including seventeen sisters. Thorn was featured in a documentary, League of Her Own, telecast nationally by the Seven Network. As of March 2017, she works as an administrator for AFL Northern Territory at the Michael Long Learning and Leadership Centre. The Michael Long Learning and Leadership Centre is a major sports facility where the Crows train in Darwin, and is also a notable educational centre for indigenous Australians.
