= Olive May Pearce =

Australian religious sister (1914–1999)

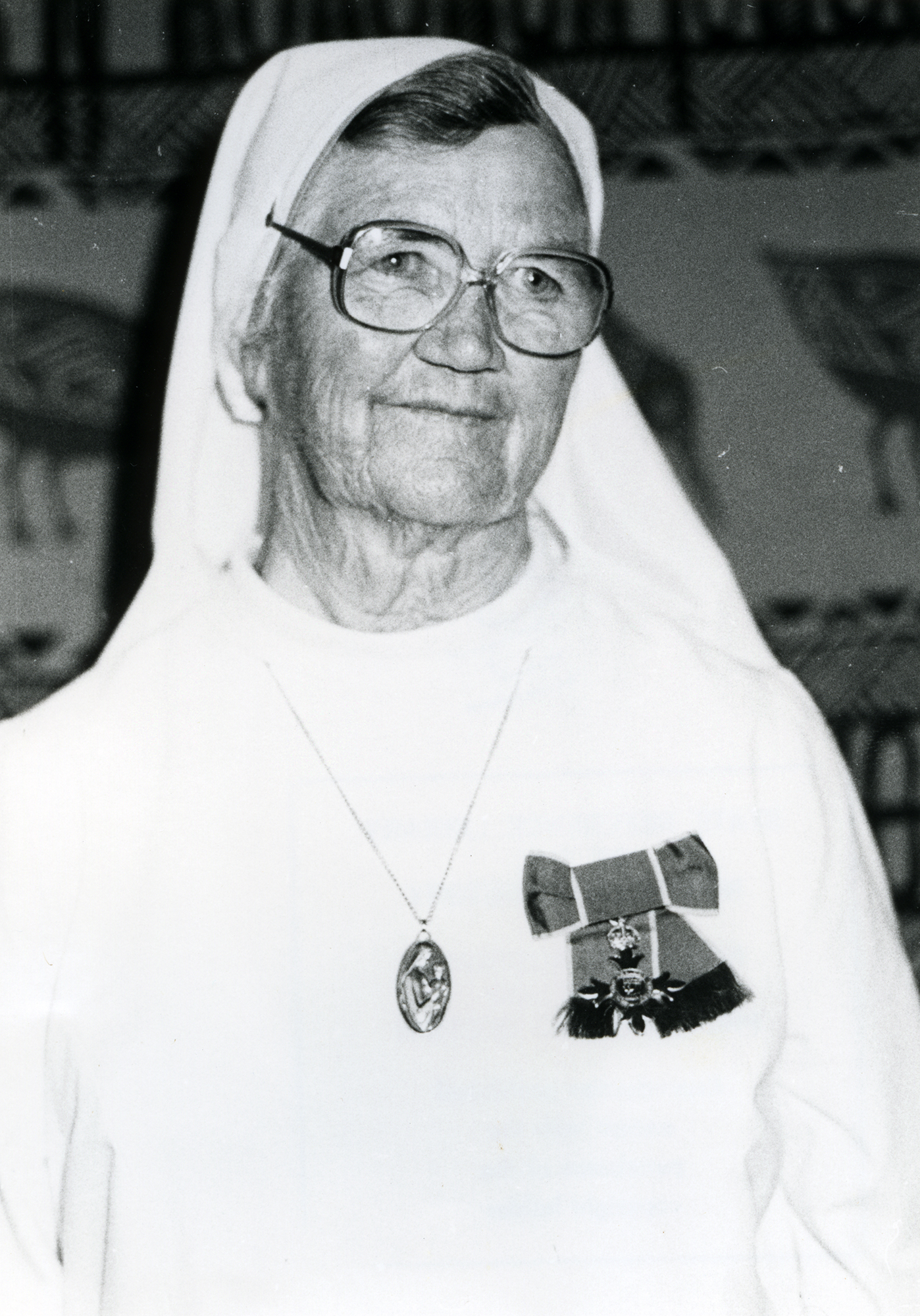
Sister Mary Eucharia MBE

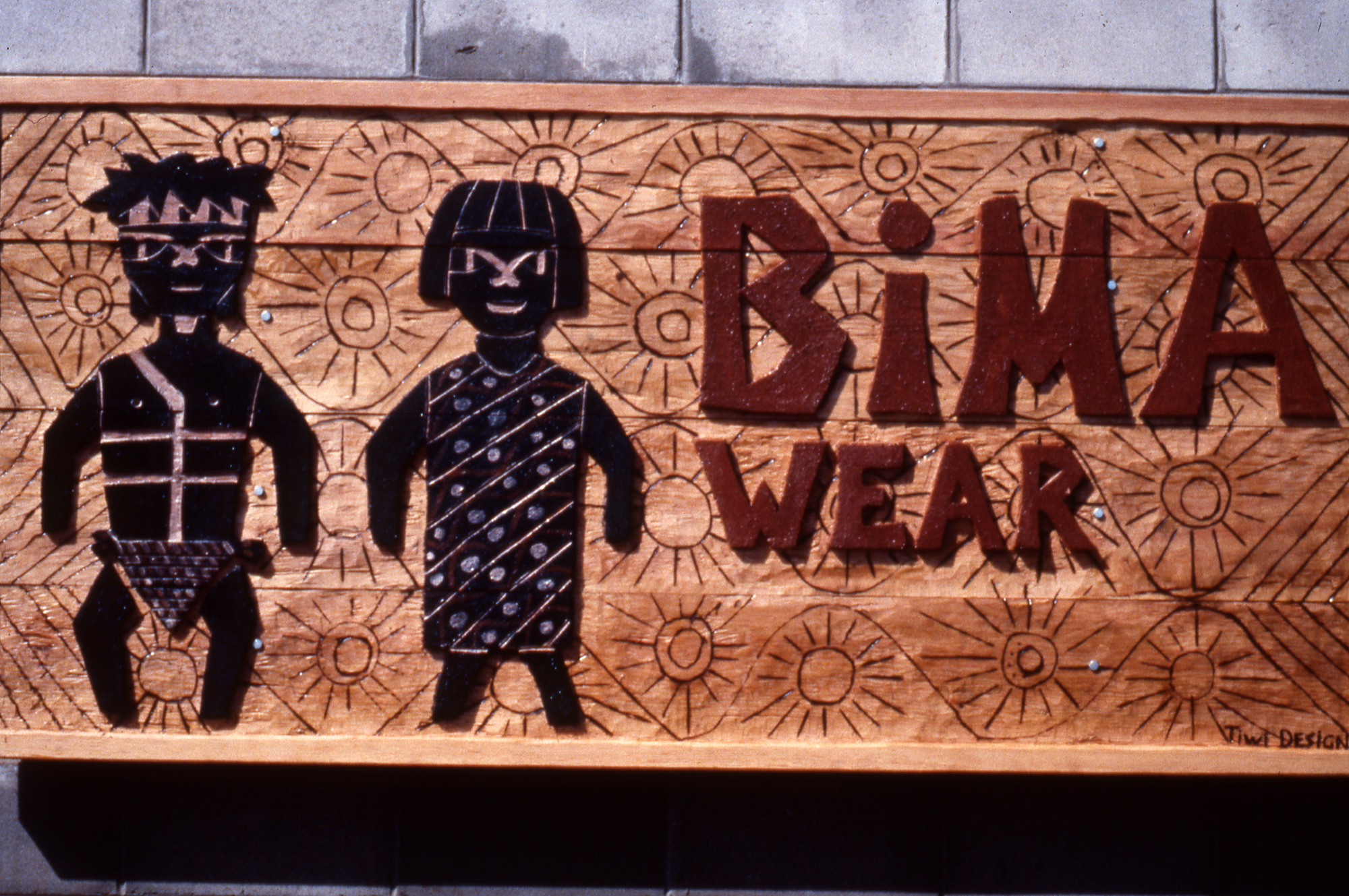
Bima Wear.

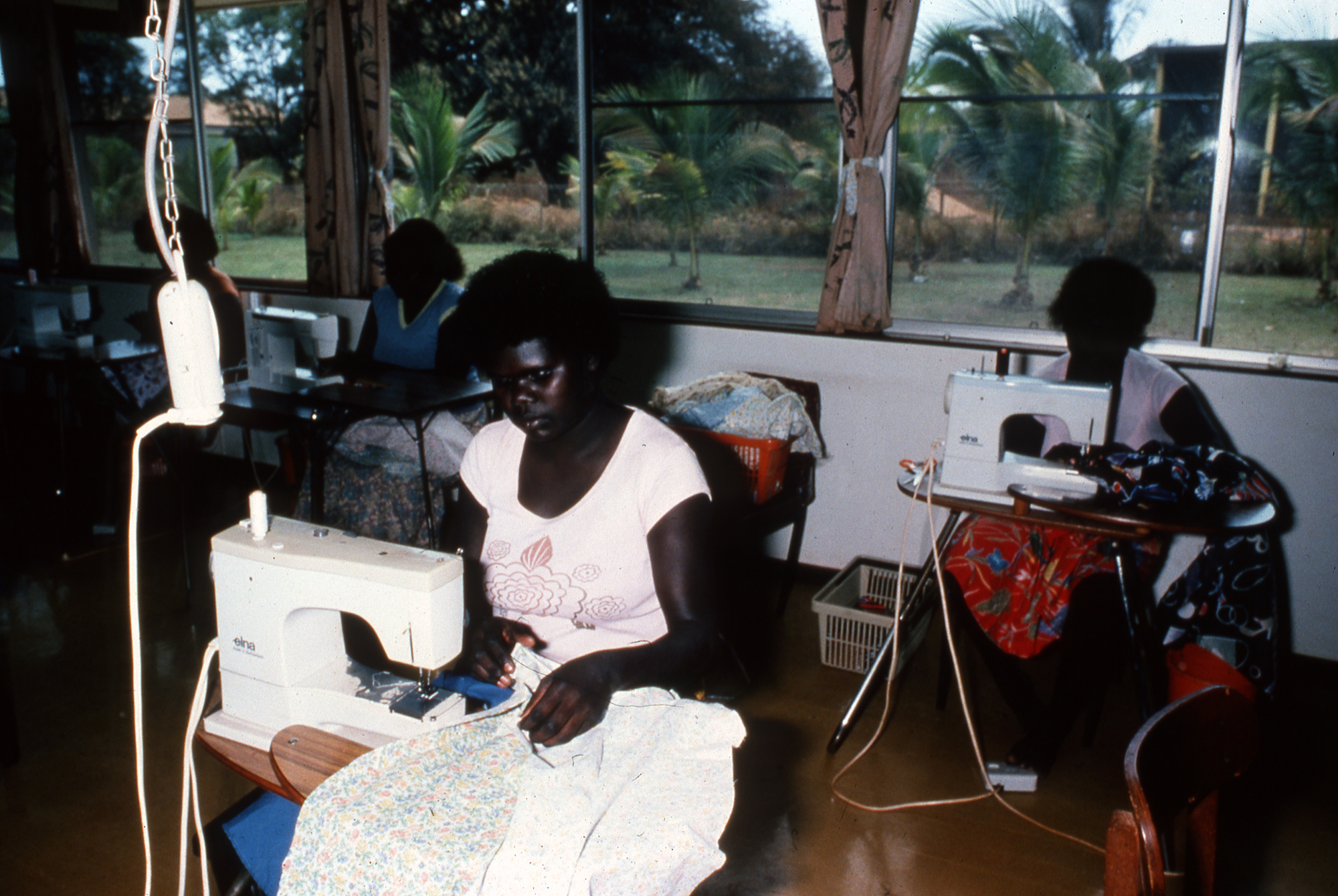
Aboriginal women sewing Bima wear garments at the factory at Nguiu, Bathurst Island.

Olive May Pearce, also known as Sister Eucharia (14 December 1914 – 5 October 1999) was an Australian religious sister best known for her work with Aboriginal children and leprosy patients. She was made a member of the Order of the British Empire in 1981.

== Early life ==
In 1914, Olive May Pearce was born in Glenbrook, New South Wales. She was the second child into a humble, working-class family with no strong religious ties. Olive woke one morning at the age of 14 to a vivid dream calling her into the service of the church. Pearce moved with her family to the Sydney suburb of Enfield, where she worked with her father in a cake shop for a short time before becoming a domestic servant. She then, at the age of 22, became a religious sister in the order of the Daughters of Our Lady of the Sacred Heart, taking the religious name of Sister Eucharia.

== Life in the Northern Territory ==
After two years of training, she was sent Bathurst Island where she lived for five years. During that time, she cared for hundreds of children, teaching the girls how to cook. In 1941 Sister Eucharia then travelled to Melville Island to work in a new home for mixed race Aboriginal children. Before the Japanese attack on northern Australia in 1942, Sister Eucharia and two other nuns accompanied forty-one children to Darwin: they were evacuated to Melbourne and then Adelaide. They returned home in 1945.

In 1946, Sister Eucharia left Melville Island to work with leprosy patients in places such as Darwin, Channel Island and East Arm. In the 1970s Sister Eucharia returned to the Tiwi Islands. She successfully applied for a government grant to establish the small clothing company Bima Wear. It is still run by Aboriginal people of the Tiwi Islands today. Plagued by poor circulation in her legs, and serving most of her time as a nun in the sweltering humid heat of the tropics of Northern Australia, Sister Eucharia was restricted her mobility, a disability which plagued her for life.

== Later life ==
After four decades of service, aged 67, Sister Eucharia was made a Member of the Order of the British Empire (MBE) in a ceremony on Bathurst Island In 1981.
