= Northern Territory Academy =

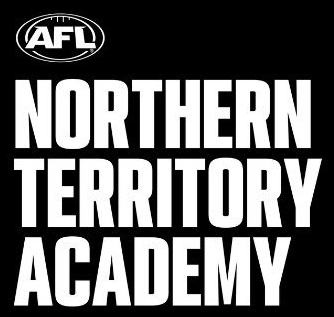

Names
- Full name: Northern Territory Academy

Club details
- Founded: 1979; 47 years ago
- Competition: Talent League Boys; Talent League Girls
- Ground: TIO Stadium

Uniforms
Home (historic)	Away (historic)

The Northern Territory Academy, formerly NT Thunder Academy, is an Australian rules football development team based in the Northern Territory (NT).

NT Academy currently fields teams in the under-18s and under-16s Talent League Boys and Talent League Girls competitions, playing a handful of games each season without being eligible for the premiership.

A senior NT Thunder club previously existed from 2008 until 2019, competing in the Queensland Australian Football League (QAFL), North East Australian Football League (NEAFL) and VFL Women's (VFLW).

== History ==
The Northern Territory joined the under-17s National Championship as the Northern Territory representative team in 1979.

In 2000, the club joined the TAC Cup (later known as the NAB League and currently known as the Talent League). The club lost the two games it played, one against Sandringham Dragons and the other against Geelong Falcons.

NT Thunder did not compete in the 2017, 2018 and 2019 seasons. The club was scheduled to compete in the 2020 season, however it was not held due to the COVID-19 pandemic.

In 2021, the academy returned with a side in the NAB League Girls competition for the first time, after the dissolution of NT Thunder.

== See also ==
- Brisbane Lions Academy
- Gold Coast Suns Academy
- Greater Western Sydney Giants Academy
- Sydney Swans Academy
