= John Tye (footballer) =

John "Bubba" Tye (1951–2014) was an Australian rules footballer who played for the Darwin Buffaloes and Nightcliff Tigers in the Northern Territory Football League (NTFL). Tye was widely considered to be the NTFL's greatest ever player.
