= Gove Australian Football League =

The Gove Australian Football League is an Australian rules football league based on the Gove Peninsula in the Northern Territory.

== Clubs ==
=== Current ===
Club	Colours	Nickname	Home Ground/Location	Est.	Years in GAFL	GAFL Premierships	
Club	Colours	Nickname	Home Ground/Location	Est.	Years in GAFL	Total	Years
Baywara		Power	Gunyangara Oval, Gunyangara		2007-2008, 2010-2016, 2018-	1	2007
Djarrak		Hawks	Yirrkala Oval, Yirrkala	1973	1975-1993, 1996-	7	1975, 1980, 1981, 2000, 2009, 2015, 2017
Gopu		Tuna	Gunyangara Oval, Gunyangara	1973	1975-	14	1994, 1995, 1996, 1998, 2001, 2002, 2008, 2010, 2011, 2012, 2020, 2022, 2024, 2025
Nguykal		King Fish	Yirrkala Oval, Yirrkala	2001	2002-	7	2003, 2013, 2014, 2016, 2018, 2019, 2021
Nhulunbuy		Saints	Hindle Oval, Nhulunbuy	1998	1998-2012, 2016-2017, 2020-	5	1999, 2004, 2005, 2006, 2023

=== Former ===
Club	Colours	Nickname	Home Ground/Location	Est.	Years in GAFL	GAFL Premierships		Fate
Club	Colours	Nickname	Home Ground/Location	Est.	Years in GAFL	Total	Years	Fate
Baru		Crocs	Maningrida	1995	1995-1996	0	-	Left league
Cats		Cats	Hindle Oval, Nhulunbuy	1973	1975-1997	8	1976, 1978, 1979, 1983, 1984, 1986, 1988, 1993	Merged with Walkabout to form Nhulunbuy after 1997 season
Datjala		Tigers	Hindle Oval, Nhulunbuy	2020	2020-2021	0	-	Folded after 2021 season
Djet				1994	1994, 1997, 2000-2002	0	-	Folded after 2002 season
Galupa		Dockers	Hindle Oval, Nhulunbuy	1997	1997-1998	1	1997	Folded
Gapuwiyak (Lake Evella 1993)		Bulls	Gapuwiyak Oval, Gapuwiyak	1993	1993, 2013-2016, 2019-2020	0	-	Folded to allow for Gapuwiyak Football League to re-form in 2021
Groote Eylandt		Stingrays	Groote Eylandt	2020	2020-2021	0	-	Left league
Gumulu				2000	2000	0	-	Left league
Insects		Insects		1980	1980-1985	0	-	Folded after 1985 season
Nhulunbuy Baywara			Hindle Oval, Nhulunbuy	2017	2017	0	-	Folded when Baywara re-formed in 2018
Walkabout (South Arnhem 1975-86)		Chooks	Hindle Oval, Nhulunbuy	1975	1975-1997	4	1977, 1982, 1985, 1987, 1989, 1991, 1992	Merged with Cats to form Nhulunbuy after 1997 season
Wurrpan		Emus		1998	1998	0	-	Left league

== Premiers ==
- 1974 NO FINALS PLAYED
- 1975 DJARRAK FC
- 1976 CATS FC
- 1977 SOUTH ARNHEM FC
- 1978 CATS FC
- 1979 CATS FC
- 1980 DJARRAK FC
- 1981 DJARRAK FC
- 1982 SOUTH ARNHEM FC
- 1983 CATS FC
- 1984 CATS FC
- 1985 SOUTH ARNHEM FC
- 1986 CATS FC
- 1987 WALKABOUT FC
- 1988 CATS FC
- 1989 WALKABOUT FC
- 1990 GOPU FC
- 1991 WALKABOUT FC
- 1992 WALKABOUT FC
- 1993 CATS FC
- 1994 GOPU FC
- 1995 GOPU FC
- 1996 GOPU FC
- 1997 GALUPU FC
- 1998 GOPU FC
- 1999 NHULUNBUY FC
- 2000 DJARRAK FC
- 2001 GOPU FC
- 2002 GOPU FC
- 2003 NGUYKAL FC
- 2004 NHULUNBUY FC
- 2005 NHULUNBUY FC
- 2006 NHULUNBUY FC
- 2007 BAYWARA FC
- 2008 GOPU FC
- 2009 DJARRAK FC
- 2010 GOPU FC
- 2011 GOPU FC
- 2012 GOPU FC
- 2013 NGUYKAL FC
- 2014 NGUYKAL FC
- 2015 DJARRAK FC
- 2016 NGUYKAL FC
- 2017 DJARRAK FC
- 2018 NGUYKAL FC
- 2019 NGUYKAL FC
- 2020 GOPU FC
- 2021 NGUYKAL FC
- 2022 GOPU FC
- 2023 NHULUNBUY FC
- 2024 GOPU FC
- 2025 GOPU FC

== See also ==
- AFL Northern Territory
- Northern Territory Football League
- Australian rules football in the Northern Territory
