= David Kantilla =

Australian rules footballer

Personal information
- Full name: David Kantilla "Amparralamtua" (traditional name)
- Born: 1938; Bathurst Island, Northern Territory
- Died: 13 June 1978 (aged 39–40); Wurrumiyanga, Northern Territory
- Original team: St Mary's
- Height: 6 ft 5 in (196 cm)

Playing career^{1}
| Years | Club | Games (Goals) |
| 1961–1966 | South Adelaide | 113 (106) |
- ^{1} Playing statistics correct to the end of 1966.

David Kantilla (1938 – 13 June 1978, traditional name Amparralamtua) was an Australian rules footballer who is recognised as the first Indigenous Australian to play in the South Australian National Football League and the first Tiwi Islander to successfully play in a southern football league. Throughout his footballing career he was known by his 'Anglo' name David Kantilla but also had his tribal name of Amparralamtua.

Kantilla was born on Bathurst Island. Standing at 6 feet 5 inches or 196 centimetres, Kantilla played as a ruckman for a couple of seasons with St Mary's in the Northern Territory Football League before joining SANFL club South Adelaide for the 1961 season. He had an immediate impact, kicking six goals against Glenelg on debut and winning the club's best and fairest award in his first two seasons.

Nicknamed "Soapy" following the publication of a photograph showing him lathered in soap in a bath, Kantilla was then moved back into the ruck, becoming a member of South Adelaide's premiership side in 1964 and by the time he left the club at the end of the 1966 season he had played 113 games. During his time in South Australia he represented the state at interstate football on four occasions during 1964 and 1965. After returning to the Northern Territory, Kantilla captain-coached St Mary's in the 1968/69 NTFL season.

Kantilla's brothers Bertram and Saturninus were members of the inaugural St Mary's team in 1952/53.

In 1978 Kantilla was killed in a car accident at Wurrumiyanga on Bathurst Island.

== Honours ==
In 1997 Kantilla was inducted into the Northern Territory Hall of Champions, the function room at NTFL headquarters at Marrara Oval is named for him, and in 2005 Kantilla was named on the interchange bench in the Indigenous Team of the Century. He is also a member of the South Adelaide Football Club Hall of Fame. In 2026 he was inducted into the Australian Football Hall of Fame in recognition of his pioneering contribution as the first Tiwi Islands player to establish a substantial SANFL career.
