= Barkly Australian Football League =

Australian rules football competition in Tennant Creek, Northern Territory, Australia

Barkly Australian Football League (BAFL)
- Sport: Australian Rules Football
- Founded: 1991
- No. of teams: 11
- Venues: Purkiss Reserve, Tennant Creek
- Most recent champions: Men: Sporties Spitfires (17); Women: Sporties Spitfires (4) (2026)
- Most titles: Sporties Spitfires (4, Women's) (17, Men's)

The Barkly Australian Football League (BAFL) is an Australian rules football competition based in Tennant Creek in the Northern Territory of Australia. The competition began in 1991 after the Tennant Creek Football Club withdrew from the Central Australian Football League to form its own local competition. All games are played at Purkiss Reserve, Tennant Creek. Games could be played at Elliott oval from 2020 onwards due to the recent upgrade to the oval in 2019.

== Current clubs ==
=== Senior Men A-Grade ===
Club	Colours	Nickname	Location	Est.	Years in BAFL	Senior Premierships	
Club	Colours	Nickname	Location	Est.	Years in BAFL	Total	Years
Ali Curung		Kangaroos	Ali Curung	1956	1991-1997, 1999-2001, 2005-2016, 2019-2020, 2022, 2024-	1	2007
Ampilatwatja		Eagles	Ampilatwatja	2016	2009, 2016-2017, 2024-	0	-
Barkly Work Camp		All Stars	Barkly Work Camp, Tennant Creek	2015	2015-2019, 2021-	0	-
Elliott		Hawks	Elliott	1991	1991-2007, 2010-2012, 2014-2016, 2018-2021, 2023-	5	1999, 2003, 2005, 2023, 2024
Imangara		Bulldogs	Imangara	2025	2025-	0	-
Jalajirrpa Mission		Warriors	Tennant Creek	2022	2022-	0	-
Soapy Bore		Crows	Soapy Bore/Arawerr	2025	2025-	1	2025
Sporties		Spitfires	Sporties Club, Tennant Creek	1991	1991-	17	1991, 1992, 1993, 1994,1996, 1998, 2001, 2002, 2010, 2014, 2015, 2016, 2017, 2019, 2020, 2021, 2022, 2026
Willowra		Double Blues	Willowra	1995	1999, 2002, 2008-2011, 2013, 2024-	0	-
YDU		Demons	Tennant Creek	2010	2009-2017, 2019-2021, 2023-	1	2024

=== Senior Women ===
Club	Colours	Nickname	Home Ground	Est.	Years in BAFL	Senior Premierships	
Club	Colours	Nickname	Home Ground	Est.	Years in BAFL	Total	Years
Ampilatwatja		Eagles	Ampilatwatja	2016	2009, 2016-2017, 2024-	0	-
Elliott		Hawks	Elliott	1991	2023-	0	-
Jalajirrpa Mission		Warriors	Tennant Creek	2023	2025-	0	-
Sporties		Spitfires	Sporties Club, Tennant Creek	1991	2022-	4	2023, 2024, 2025, 2026
Ti-Tree		Roosters	Ti-Tree		2026- (Women's team only)	0	-

=== Women's sides in recess ===
Club	Colours	Nickname	Home Ground	Est.	Years in BAFL	Senior Premierships	
Club	Colours	Nickname	Home Ground	Est.	Years in BAFL	Total	Years
Ali Curung		Kangaroos	Ali Curung	1991	2022-2024	1	2022
YDU		Demons	Tennant Creek	2010	2022-	0	-

== Former clubs ==
Club	Colours	Nickname	Home Ground	Est.	Years in BAFL	Senior Premierships		Fate
Club	Colours	Nickname	Home Ground	Est.	Years in BAFL	Total	Years	Fate
Arlparra		Dockers	Arlparra		2007-2008, 2013-2014	0	-	Left league, have played in Central Australian FL since 2023
Borroloola		Thunder	Borroloola		2021	0	-	Left league, have played in Big Rivers FL in 2025
Canteen Creek		Blues	Canteen Creek	1996	1996-1998, 2001, 2004-2011, 2015, 2017-2019, 2022, 2024-2025	0	-	In recess since 2025
Eastern Davenport		Storm	Eastern Davenport Ranges		2013	0	-	Left league
Epenarra		Saints	Wutunugurra	2000	2000-2001, 2006-2008, 2010, 2012-2013, 2024-2025	0	-	In recess since 2025
Janapurlalki		Eagles	Tennant Creek	1991	1991-2019, 2021-2025	7	1995, 2004, 2006, 2008, 2009, 2013, 2018	In recess since 2025
Kalinjari (Buramana 1996-99, Karlinju 2000-02)	(1996-2000)2002-03)	Dockers	Kalinjari	1996	1996-2000, 2002-2003	0	-	Left league
Likkiparta (Wogyala 1999-2002)		Swans	Wogyala Community		1999, 2001–2002, 2004	0	-	Left league
Marla		Power	Marla Community		2007-2009, 2012-2013	0	-	Left league
Marlinja		Cats	Marlinja Community		1995-1998	0	-	Left league
Memo		Magpies	Tennant Creek Memorial Club, Tennant Creek	1991	1991-2003	2	1997, 2000	Folded after 2003 season
Ti-Tree		Roosters	Ti-Tree		2011-2013	2	2011, 2012	Left league, have played in Central Australian FL since 2015
Wilora		Lions	Wilora		1992-1993, 1995-1996, 2000	0	-	Left league

== Premierships ==
=== Division 1 ===
- 1991 – Sporties Spitfires
- 1992 – Sporties Spitfires
- 1993 – Sporties Spitfires
- 1994 – Sporties Spitfires
- 1995 – Janapurlalki Eagles
- 1996 – Sporties Spitfires
- 1997 – Memo Magpies
- 1998 – Sporties Spitfires
- 1999 – Elliott Hawks
- 2000 – Memo Magpies
- 2001 – Sporties Spitfires
- 2002 – Sporties Spitfires
- 2003 – Elliott Hawks
- 2004 – Janapurlalki Eagles
- 2005 – Elliott Hawks
- 2006 – Janapurlalki Eagles
- 2007 – Ali Curung Kangaroos
- 2008 – Janapurlalki Eagles
- 2009 – Janapurlalki Eagles
- 2010 – Sporties Spitfires
- 2011 – Ti Tree Roosters
- 2012 – Ti Tree Roosters
- 2013 – Janapurlalki Eagles
- 2014 – Sporties Spitfires
- 2015 – Sporties Spitfires
- 2016 – Sporties Spitfires
- 2017 – Sporties Spitfires
- 2018 – Janapurlalki Eagles
- 2019 – Sporties Spitfires
- 2020 – Sporties Spitfires
- 2021 – Sporties Spitfires
- 2022 – Sporties Spitfires
- 2023 – Elliott Hawks
- 2024 – Elliott Hawks
- 2025 – No premiership

=== Division 2 ===
- 2025 – Soapy Bore

== Grand Finals ==
- 1991 – Sporties Spitfires 19.24 (138) def Memo Magpies 3.3 (21)
- 1992 – Sporties Spitfires 13.11 (89) def Memo Magpies 9.6 (60)
- 1993 – Sporties Spitfires 21.16 (142) def Janapurlalki Eagles 5.7 (37)
- 1994 – Sporties Spitfires 12.18 (90) def Janapurlalki Eagles 12.9 (81)
- 1995 – Janapurlalki Eagles 13.6 (84) def Sporties Spitfires 10.10 (70)
- 1996 – Sporties Spitfires 12.12 (84) def Elliott Hawks 3.8 (26)
- 1997 – Memo Magpies 11.14 (80) def Sporties Spitfires 5.8 (38)
- 1998 – Sporties Spitfires 13.9 (87) def Janapurlalki Eagles 8.10 (58)
- 1999 – Elliott Hawks 22.17 (149) def Ali Curung 9.4 (58)
- 2000 – Memo Magpies 16.10 (106) def Elliott Hawks 12.11 (83)
- 2001 – Sporties Spitfires 21.10 (136) def Ali Curung 10.6 (66)
- 2002 – Sporties Spitfires 19.13 (127) def Janapurlalki Eagles 7.5 (47)
- 2003 – Elliott Hawks 20.12 (132) def Sporties Spitfires 6.7 (43)
- 2004 – Janapurlalki Eagles 14.13 (97) def Elliott Hawks 9.9 (63)
- 2005 – Elliott Hawks 14.9 (93) def Janapurlalki Eagles 12.12 (84)
- 2006 – Janapurlalki Eagles 11.16 (82) def Elliott Hawks 9.9 (63)
- 2007 – Ali Curung 13.10 (88) def Sporties Spitfires 12.5 (77)
- 2008 – Janapurlalki Eagles 14.17 (101) def Sporties Spitfires 5.8 (38)
- 2009 – Janapurlalki Eagles 17.8 (110) def Willowra 8.5 (53)
- 2010 – Sporties Spitfires 23.7 (145) def Elliott Hawks 6.5 (41)
- 2011 – Ti Tree 9.5 (59) def Janapurlalki Eagles 7.9 (51)
- 2012 – Ti Tree 14.10 (94) def Janapurlalki Eagles 13.14 (92)
- 2013 – Janapurlalki Eagles 15.21 (111) def Ali Curung 14.7 (91)
- 2014 – Sporties Spitfires 12.9 (81) def Elliott Hawks 6.9 (45)
- 2015 – Sporties Spitfires 14.21 (105) def Janapurlalki Eagles 10.2 (62)
- 2016 – Sporties Spitfires 12.13 (85) def Barkly Work Camp (BWC) 7.8 (50)
- 2017 – Sporties Spitfires 8.10 (58) def Elliott Hawks 8.7 (55)
- 2018 – Janapurlalki Eagles 12.12 (84) def Elliott Hawks 12.8 (80)
- 2019 – Sporties Spitfires 11.13 (79) def Elliott Hawks 7.5 (47) at Purkiss Reserve, Tennant Creek on 14 September 2019.
- 2020 - Sporties Spitfires 7.15 (57) def Elliott Hawks 8.3 (51)
- 2021 - Sporties Spitfires 17.16 (118) def Janapurlalki Eagles 8.6 (54)
- 2022 - Sporties Spitfires 11.13 (79) def Ali Curung 7.9 (51)
- 2023 - Elliott Hawks 20.6 (126) def Ali Curung 10.7 (67)
- 2024 - Elliott Hawks 11.9 (75) def YDU 9.11 (65)
- 2025 - Grand Final abandoned

=== Division 2 ===
- 2025 - Soapy Bore 6.7 (43) def Ampilatwatja 6.5 (41)

== See also ==
- AFL Northern Territory
- Northern Territory Football League
- Australian rules football in the Northern Territory
