= HMS Prometheus =

Several ships of the Royal Navy have been named HMS Prometheus.

- HMS Prometheus (1807), launched in 1807, was involved an action in the Gulf of Finland in the Baltic in 1809 (see HMS Cerberus or HMS Minotaur). She was used for harbour service from 1819, renamed HMS Veteran (fireship) in 1839 and broken up in 1852.
- HMS Prometheus (1839) was an Alecto-class paddle sloop launched in 1839.
- HMS Prometheus (1898) was a Pelorus-class protected cruiser launched in 1898, and sold in 1914.
