= AFL Northern Territory =

AFL Northern Territory Limited
- Sport: Australian Rules Football
- Jurisdiction: Northern Territory
- Founded: 3 September 2001; 24 years ago
- Headquarters: Michael Long Learning and Leadership Centre, Marrara Oval
- Location: Marrara, Darwin
- Replaced: Northern Territory Football League Incorporated
- (Northern Territory)

AFL Northern Territory Limited (AFL NT) is a subsidiary company of the Australian Football League (AFL) which operates some Australian rules football competitions and teams in Northern Territory (NT) of Australia (see also Australian rules football in the Northern Territory. AFL NT was registered on 3 September 2001 and its office is at the Michael Long Learning and Leadership Centre, Marrara Stadium, Darwin, Northern Territory.

On 3 September 2001, the businesses of the formerly independent Northern Territory Football League Incorporated (NTFL), which had overseen Australian Football in the NT since 1917, were taken-over by the Melbourne-based AFL, causing disquiet among supporters of Australian Football in the Northern Territory. The Northern Territory Football League Incorporated was subsequently wound-up and de-registered on 19 September 2002, ending its long history and local control of Australian Football. The name, Northern Territory Football League is now owned by the AFL and licensed to AFL NT as a registered business name. NTFL board member Darryl Window orchestrated the takeover.

Several of the larger NT competitions including the Northern Territory Football League (NTFL), Central Australian Football League (CAFL), Gove Australian Football League, Big Rivers Football League (BRFL) and Barkly Australian Football League (BAFL) are affiliated to AFL NT.

== See also ==
- Sport in the Northern Territory
- Northern Territory Football League
- List of Australian rules football leagues in Australia
