= Wurrumiyanga =

Community on Bathurst Island, Australia

Nguiu
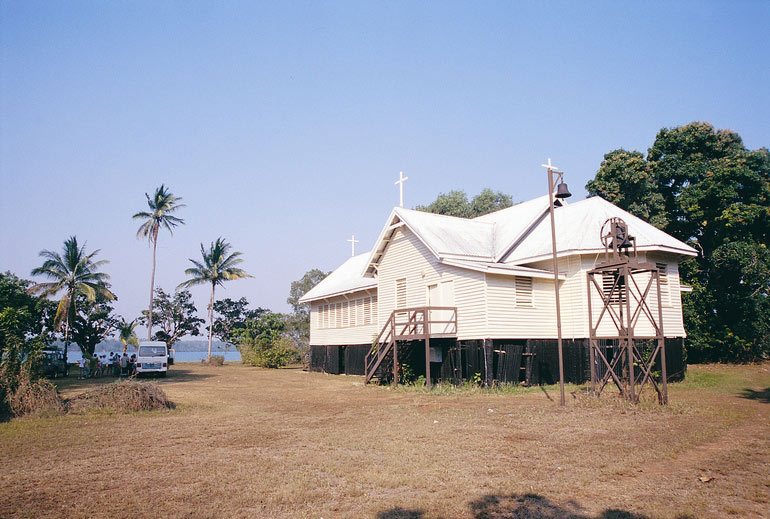
- Saint Therese Church in 2007
- Warrumiyanga on Bathurst Island, off the coast of the Northern Territory, Australia

Geography
- Location: Timor Sea
- Coordinates: 11°45′32.76″S 130°38′4.92″E
- Archipelago: Tiwi Islands

Administration
- Australia
- Territory: Northern Territory

Demographics
- Population: 1,563 (2016)
- Ethnic groups: Tiwi

Wurrumiyanga (/wʊrʊmiˈjɑːŋə/), formerly Nguiu (/ˈnjuːjuː/, locally [ˈŋuju]), is a community on the southern coast of Bathurst Island, Northern Territory, Australia. With about 1,600 residents, it is the largest community on the island. There are regular ferries and flights between Wurrumiyanga and Darwin, as well as a ferry that connects Wurrumiyanga with nearby Melville Island. The Tiwi Islands Football League, an Australian rules football competition, hosts most of its games in Wurrumiyanga.

== History ==
Nguiu was founded in 1911 as a Catholic mission by Francis Xavier Gsell.

The community's only post office was opened on 3 June 1974.

In 2010, Nguiu was renamed Wurrumiyanga, meaning "the place where the cycads grow", upon the request of the Tiwi Land Council.

== Demographics ==
The 2016 census recorded a population of 1,563 residents in Wurrumiyanga.

== Culture ==
Wurrumiyanga is the home of Tiwi Designs, an art corporation involving some 100 indigenous artists and which produces fabric, carvings, ceramics, prints, and paintings. Its goal is to promote, preserve, and enrich Tiwi culture.

== Education ==
There are two schools in the town, both founded by Gsell's Catholic mission: Murrupurtiyanuwu Catholic Primary School in 1912, and Xavier Catholic College in 1932. Xavier Catholic College began as a boys' school but has since become a coeducational school for students in years 7 to 13.

== Sports ==
The Tiwi Islands Football League, an Australian rules football competition, hosts most of its matches, including the finals, in Wurrumiyanga.

== Transportation ==
Wurrumiyanga can be reached from Darwin on the Australian mainland by ferry or plane. There are daily flights between the two, and the ferry operates four days a week, on Sunday, Monday, Thursday, and Friday. An inter-island ferry also connects the community with the adjacent Melville Island.
