= Central Australian Football League =

Australian rules football competition in Alice Springs, Northern Territory, Australia

Central Australian Football League (CAFL)
- Sport: Australian Rules Football
- Founded: 1988
- Administrator: AFL Northern Territory
- No. of teams: 5 (Senior), 10 (Community League)
- Headquarters: Traeger Park, Alice Springs
- Venues: Traeger Park, Jim McConville Oval, Albrect Oval, various community ovals
- Most recent champions: Men: Rovers (15); Women: Wests (1); Community Men: Western Aranda (2) (2026) (2026)
- Most titles: Pioneer (33) (Men's); Rovers, Pioneer (4) (Women's); Laramba (6) (Community League)

The Central Australian Football League (CAFL) is an Australian rules football competition operating out of Alice Springs in the Northern Territory, Australia. Established in 1947, the Central Australian Football League is the oldest, most popular football league in Central Australia.. It is notable for producing Victorian Football League/Australian Football League players such as Darryl White, Joel Bowden and Liam Jurrah.

The home of the Central Australian Football League is Traeger Park in Alice Springs. All Senior games are played at Traeger Park, Albrecht Oval, or Jim McConville Oval. The Central Australian Football League consists currently of Senior Men's and Women's divisions, a Reserves Men's, Men's Community League, Under 18 Boys, Under 17 Girls, and Under 15 Boys.

== Current clubs ==
=== Senior men ===
Club	Colours	Nickname	Est.	Years in CAFL	CAFL Senior Premierships	
Club	Colours	Nickname	Est.	Years in CAFL	Total	Years
Federal		Demons	1947	1947-	15	1950, 1955, 1958, 1959, 1960, 1961, 1962, 1963, 1974, 2011, 2013, 2015, 2016, 2023, 2025
Pioneer		Eagles	1947	1947-	33	1947, 1948, 1949, 1951, 1953, 1956, 1957, 1965, 1966, 1967, 1968, 1969, 1971, 1972, 1975, 1976, 1977, 1981, 1983, 1985, 1987, 1989, 1990, 1991, 1994, 1997, 1998, 2000, 2001, 2009, 2010, 2022, 2024
Rovers		Double Blues	1947	1947-	15	1952, 1954, 1964, 1973, 1978, 1986, 1988, 1996, 2012, 2017, 2018, 2019, 2020, 2021, 2026
South Alice Springs (Amoonguna 1962-70)		Kangaroos	1962	1962-	7	1984, 1992, 1993, 1995, 1999, 2003, 2014
West Alice Springs (Melanka 1970-72)		Bloods	1970	1970-	8	1979, 1980, 1982, 2002, 2004, 2005, 2006, 2007

=== Senior Women ===
Club	Colours	Nickname	Est.	Years in CAFL	CAFL Senior Premierships	
Club	Colours	Nickname	Est.	Years in CAFL	Total	Years
Federal		Demons	1947	2022-	0	-
Pioneer		Eagles	1947	?-present	4	2014, 2015, 2016, 2019,
Rovers		Double Blues	1947	?-present	4	2020, 2021, 2024, 2025
South Alice Springs		Kangaroos	1962	?-2015, 2020-	0	-
West Alice Springs		Bloods	1970	2017-	1	2026

=== Community League ===
Club	Colours	Nickname	Location	Est.	Years in CAFL	Known CAFL Senior Premierships	
Club	Colours	Nickname	Location	Est.	Years in CAFL	Total	Years
Arlparra		Dockers	Utopia		2023-2024	0	-
Eastern Plenty (Plenty Highway 2016-22)		Swans	Hart Range		2016-2022, 2024-	0	-
Ltyentye Apurte		Eagles	Ltyente Apurte Community		2008-	3	2017 (CL), 2019 (CL), 2020 (CDSC)
Laramba (Anmatjere 2008-13)		Roos	Laramba		2008-2021, 2024-	6	2014, 2015*, 2016*, 2017 (CC), 2018 (CC), 2025 (CL)
Mt Allan		Eagles	Yuelamu		2019-	1	2022 (CL)
Papunya		Eagles	Papunya	1960s	2008, 2020-	3	2021 (CL), 2023 (CL), 2024 (CL)
Ti Tree		Roosters	Ti-Tree		2015-2021, 2023-	0	-
Utju (Areyonga 2011-22)		Tigers	Areyonga	1960s	2011-2023, 2025-	1	2014*
Western Aranda (Hermannsburg 2009-10)		Bulldogs	Hermannsburg		2013-	2	2016 (CL), 2026 (CL)
Yuendumu		Magpies	Yuendumu	1959	2008-2010, 2015-	2	2008, 2015 (CL)

=== Former clubs ===
Club	Colours	Nickname	Location	Est.	Years in CAFL	CAFL Senior Premierships		Fate
Club	Colours	Nickname	Location	Est.	Years in CAFL	Total	Years	Fate
Alkamilya		Panthers	Alice Springs	2011	2011-2025	3	2017, 2018, 2023	Only fielded women's team. In recess since end of 2025 season
Engawala		Crows	Engawala		2022	0	-	Left league
Mutitjulu		Cats	Mutitjulu		2022-2023	0	-	Left league
MacDonnell Districts		Crows	Papunya, Haasts Bluff	2009	2009-2015, 2017–2019	2	2013, 2018 (CL)	Split into Papunya and Haasts Bluff following 2019 season
Mulga Bore		Magpies	Engawala		2013-2018	0	-	Left league
Nyirripi		Demons	Nyirripi		2012-2021	0	-	Left league
Titjikala		Hawks	Titjikala		2012-2025	0	-	Left league
Willowra		Double Blues	Willowra		2019-2020	1	2019 (CC)	Moved to Tanami FL following 2020 season, now in Barkly Australian Football League

== Senior Men's Premiers ==
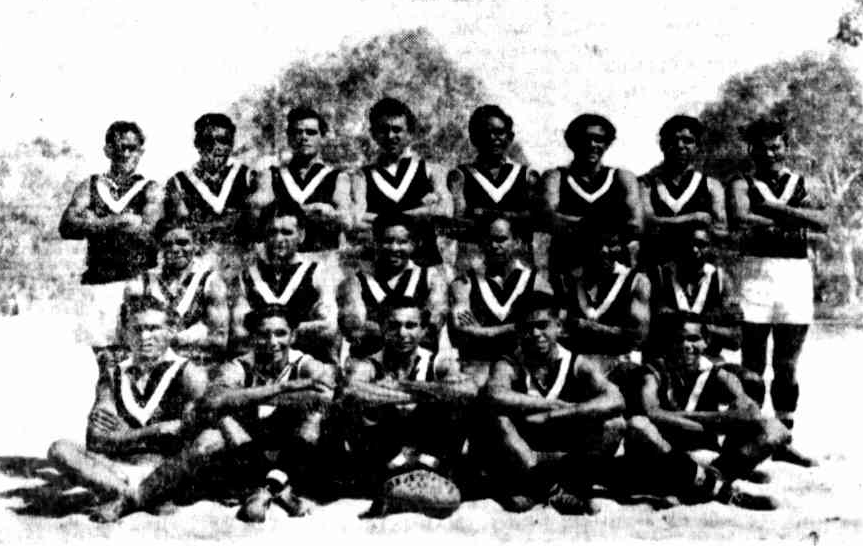
Pioneer Football Club CAFA Premiers 1953

List of premiers for the CAFL Premier division.

- 1947 Pioneer
- 1948 Pioneer
- 1949 Pioneer
- 1950 Federal
- 1951 Pioneer
- 1952 Rovers
- 1953 Pioneer
- 1954 Rovers
- 1955 Federal
- 1956 Pioneer
- 1957 Pioneer
- 1958 Federal
- 1959 Federal
- 1960 Federal
- 1961 Federal
- 1962 Federal
- 1963 Federal
- 1964 Rovers
- 1965 Pioneer
- 1966 Pioneer
- 1967 Pioneer
- 1968 Pioneer
- 1969 Pioneer
- 1970 Rovers
- 1971 Pioneer
- 1972 Pioneer
- 1973 Rovers
- 1974 Federal
- 1975 Pioneer
- 1976 Pioneer
- 1977 Pioneer
- 1978 Rovers
- 1979 West Alice Springs
- 1980 West Alice Springs
- 1981 Pioneer
- 1982 West Alice Springs
- 1983 Pioneer
- 1984 South Alice Springs
- 1985 Pioneer
- 1986 Rovers
- 1987 Pioneer
- 1988 Rovers
- 1989 Pioneer
- 1990 Pioneer
- 1991 Pioneer
- 1992 South Alice Springs
- 1993 South Alice Springs
- 1994 Pioneer
- 1995 South Alice Springs
- 1996 Rovers
- 1997 Pioneer
- 1998 Pioneer
- 1999 South Alice Springs
- 2000 Pioneer
- 2001 Pioneer
- 2002 West Alice Springs
- 2003 South Alice Springs
- 2004 West Alice Springs
- 2005 West Alice Springs
- 2006 West Alice Springs
- 2007 West Alice Springs
- 2008 Yuendumu
- 2009 Pioneer
- 2010 Pioneer
- 2011 Federal
- 2012 Rovers
- 2013 Federal
- 2014 South Alice Springs
- 2015 Federal
- 2016 Federal
- 2017 Rovers
- 2018 Rovers
- 2019 Rovers
- 2020 Rovers
- 2021 Rovers
- 2022 Pioneer
- 2023 Federal
- 2024 Pioneer
- 2025 Federal
- 2026 Rovers

== Recent Reserve Grade Grand Final Results ==
Year	Premiers	Score	Runners Up	Score
2018	Rovers	5.7 (37)	Federal	3.5 (23)
2019	Pioneer	8.9 (57)	South Alice	7.8 (50)
2020	Rovers	5.7 (37)	Federal	3.5 (23)
2021	Rovers	10.10 (70)	Federal	10.8 (68)
2022	Federal	12.5 (77)	West Alice	6.6 (42)
2023	Federal	9.10 (64)	West Alice	3.4 (22)
2024	Federal	8.13 (61)	South Alice	7.5 (47)
2025	Federal	13.10 (88)	West Alice	5.4 (34)
2026	Pioneer	12.9 (81)	Federal	7.2 (44)

=== Reserves Premierships Summary List (2018 - Current) ===
Club	Premiers
Pioneer	2
Rovers	3
Federal	4
West Alice Springs	-
South Alice Springs	-

== AFL/AFLW Players ==
- Gilbert McAdam - South Alice
- Joel Bowden - West Alice
- Liam Jurrah - Yuendemu
- Darryl White - Pioneer
- Matt Campbell - Pioneer
- Fred Campbell - Pioneer
- Richie Cole - Pioneer
- Patrick Bowden - Rovers
- Jordann Hickey - Rovers

== See also ==
- AFL Northern Territory
- Northern Territory Football League
