= C. W. M. Hart =

Australian anthropologist

Charles William Merton Hart (1905–1976) was a social anthropologist and sociologist best known for his study of the Tiwi people of the Bathurst and Melville Islands (or Tiwi Islands) in north Australia during the 1920s. He has been described as a "legendary ethnographer".

== Education and career ==
Hart studied anthropology at the University of Sydney. His first teaching position was at the University of Toronto, from 1932. From 1947 to 1959 he was at the University of Wisconsin–Madison, and from 1959 to 1969 at Istanbul University. In 1969 he retired to North America, taking a visiting position at Wichita State University in 1971 which he held until his death.

== Research and publications ==
Together with Arnold R. Pilling, Hart authored The Tiwi of North Australia (New York, 1960), a classic work of ethnography based in part on his fieldwork among the Tiwi in 1928–1929. At the heart of the study was the manner in which older men maintained authority over younger men and over women through their power to provide brides. This was one of the first participant-observation studies of a population of Australian Aborigines still functioning as a hunter-gatherer society. The third edition (1988) was revised by Jane Goodale.

In 1947 and 1948 Hart conducted sociological research into industrial relations in Windsor, Ontario on behalf of the Institute of Industrial Relations of the University of Toronto.

== Criticism ==
Hart is now sometimes noted for his failure to take proper account of the role of grandmothers in hunter-gatherer society, dismissing elderly women as "a terrible nuisance" and "physically quite revolting".
