= Tiwi Land Council =

Aboriginal land council representing the people of the Tiwi Islands, Australia

The Tiwi Land Council is a land council in the Northern Territory of Australia established in 1978 to represent Aboriginal Australians living on the Tiwi Islands. It is one of four land councils in the Northern Territory.

It was established following requests by the Tiwi people for recognition of their distinct geographic and cultural identity. These representations were a consequence of the Aboriginal Land Rights (Northern Territory) Act 1976. A special gathering on Bathurst Island attended by the then Minister for Aboriginal Affairs, Ian Viner, instituted the Tiwi Land Council on 7 September 1978, following Gazettal of the Land Council in Special Gazette No S 162 of 18 August 1978.

The land council's area of operation is "Bathurst Island, Buchanan Island, Melville Island and every island wholly within the distance of 5.56 kilometres (3.00 nmi) of the mean low water line of Melville Island."

The Tiwi Land Council aims to manage, protect and develop the interests of the Tiwi people in order to build and maintain an independent and resilient Tiwi society.

== Leadership ==
| Name | Role | Elected |
|---|---|---|
| Cyril Kalippa | Inaugural Chair | 1978 |
| Jimmy Tipungwuti | Chair | 1981 |
| Walter Kerinaiua | Chair | 1991 |
| Matthew Wonaeamirri | Chair | 1994 |
| Marius Puruntatameri | Chair | 1997 |
| Matthew Wonaeamirri | Chair | 2000 |
| Frederick Mungatopi | Chair | 2003 |
| Robert Tipungwuti | Chair | 2006 |
| Gibson Farmer Illortaminni | Chair | 2012 |
| Leslie Tungatalum | Chair | 2024 |
