= Kitty Kantilla =

Australian Aboriginal painter

Kitty Kantilla also known as Kutuwalumi Purawarrumpatu or Mary Campion (c. 1928 – 4 October 2003) was a renowned Aboriginal artist from the Tiwi Islands of the Northern Territory of Australia; she was a Tiwi woman. She worked in a variety of media, including carved ironwood sculptures, tunga (bark baskets), painting on paper, canvas and prints. Her work is held in collections around Australia.

== Early life ==
Kantilla was born on at Piripumawu on the eastern coast of Melville Island (Yermalner). She grew up on Yimpinari country traditionally eating the abundant bush foods local to the area, living under paperbark shelters and speaking 'old' Tiwi. She lived at Paru on Melville Island, which she preferred as it was her mother's country. She temporarily moved to the mission on Bathurst Island after the Japanese bombings of the Tiwi Islands in 1941. She later returned to Paru, where a number of artists were based. Those artists travelled by canoe or swam to Wurrumiyanga to sell their work.

For a time she moved to nearby Bathurst Island (Nguyu) where she began work as an artist, mostly carving tutini (grave poles) and figures, but in 1970 she moved again to Paru where she would go on to join a group of women artists, known as the Paru Women, who sold their art at Nguyu at the Tiwi Pima established in 1976. During this period of her life she mainly produced carvings, but around 1985 she would move once more to Milikapiti, a nearby settlement, where she began to produce paintings.

== Artworks ==
Kantilla's artistic work appears to have begun, after the death of her husband in 1968, with her creation of figurative carvings of ironwood influenced by Tiwi ceremonial contexts while living in Paru. In describing her work from this period Kantilla said:

"The jilamara that I do, it's my father's design. I watched him as young girl and I've still got design in my head. As a young girl, when my sister passed away, I watched him. When he died, I did the same design, right through Nguyu, I kept painting. When my husband died in Adelaide, they wanted to give me a widow's pension but I said, 'No, I'll work, make jilamara, carving, make my own living'. Right through all the way, working everyday! When we gathered logs for carving, there was no transport! We carried them on our shoulder, walking, having a rest, walking a long way, heavy work. We worked at home [Paru], with no chainsaws, just tomahawk, carving, hard work. Then we would take the carvings by canoe, paddling across to Nguyu to sell them".

In the late-1980s Kantilla moved back to Melville Island, living at Milikapiti where she began to produce her more contemporary work.

She produced most of her work through the new Jilamara Arts and Craft Association (Milikapiti) which was established in 1989. Her early works were on bark but she later painted on canvas.She quickly became one of its leading artists, where she was known as "Dot Dot" or the "Queen of Jilamara". She had her first solo show at Aboriginal and South Pacific Gallery, Surry Hills, Sydney in 1994.

In 1995 started working with printmaking techniques, which was far different to the work that she had done thus far. She found that, in using this new medium, she was able to think out her ideas afresh and differed significantly from her earlier works. Kantilla's prints were long and narrow and generally composed of fine and freely drawn lines.

Before her death in 2003 her work had been exhibited in major exhibitions such as Pumpuni Jilamara: Tiwi Art at the Art Gallery of New South Wales in 2002, Beyond the Pale at the Adelaide Biennial of Australian Art at the Art Gallery of South Australia in 2000 and at the National Gallery of Victoria.

Her works are held widely in the collections of major art galleries around Australia, including the National Gallery of Australia, National Gallery of Victoria and Art Gallery of New South Wales, Museum Victoria and the Museum and Art Gallery of the Northern Territory.

== Exhibitions ==
- Kitty Kantilla (Retrospective Solo Exhibition) 27 Apr 2007 – 19 Aug 2007 - The Ian Potter Centre: NGV (National Gallery of Victoria Australia) Fed Square, Melbourne.
- "Kitty Kantilla" Exhibition Poster (2007) NGA National Gallery of Australia
- Adelaide Biennial of Australian Art 2000: Beyond the Pale: contemporary Indigenous art - Australia Gallery of South Australia, 4 March - 16 April 2000.

== Legacy ==
Kantilla's work was cited as an important influence on the work of the Australian ceramic artist Pippin Drysdale.
