= Matthias Ulungura =

First Australian to take Japanese prisoner of war on Australian soil (1921-1980)

Matthias Ulungura (1921–1980) (in some sources also referred to as Matthias Ullungura or Matthias Ngapiatulawai) was an Indigenous Australian from the Tiwi Islands, who in 1942 became the first Australian to take a Japanese prisoner of war on Australian soil.

== The capture ==
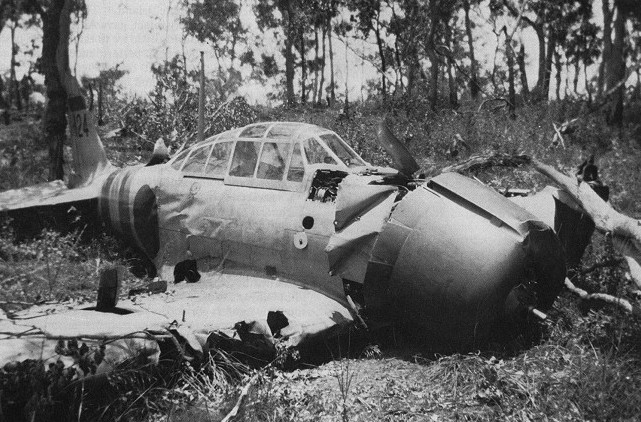
Toyoshima's crashed aircraft

Ulungura was a member of the Tiwi people, who in 1942 was living on Melville Island. On 19 February, a damaged Japanese fighter returning from an attack on an aerodrome on nearby Bathurst Island crashed near Snake Bay on Melville Island. The Japanese pilot, Hajime Toyoshima, survived the crash, but Ulungura crept up behind him, surprising him with a tomahawk, and took him prisoner. In Ulungura's words:

I walked after him and grabbed his wrist near gun. He got proper big fright. I take revolver from his right side near his knee. Then I walk backwards pointing gun, I say "Stick 'em up, two hands, no more holding hands on head."

— Matthias Ulungura

Ulungura took his prisoner to the RAAF guards stationed at the Bathurst Island aerodrome, where he was transferred into their custody. Toyoshima initially used the alias of Tadao Minami and claimed he had been washed ashore in an attempt to prevent his captors from locating his downed plane, but after questioning police saw through his story and located the wreckage. The wreckage was transferred to Darwin, and Toyoshima was taken to a prisoner of war camp, where he died in 1944 during the Cowra breakout.

Although Ulungura could not be enlisted because of his race (Australian military policy at the time forbade Indigenous Australians from enlisting), Corporal Moore, one of the two guards permanently stationed on Bathurst Island, took Ulungura on as his personal bodyguard and assistant.

== Memorials ==
The government of the Northern Territory in 1985 unveiled a memorial to Ulungura. The dedication for the memorial, which took the form of a cairn, was attended by Chief Minister Ian Tuxworth and Opposition Leader Bob Collins.

Despite Ulungura's role as the first Australian to take a Japanese prisoner of war in Australia, he remains relatively unknown. Indigenous leader Mick Dodson has remarked that "the fact that an Aboriginal man took the first Japanese prisoner of war on Australian soil was hardly known in Australia."

A life-sized bronze statue of Matthias Ulungura was erected on Bathurst Island in 2016.

== See also ==
- List of Indigenous Australian historical figures
