= Adam Kerinaiua =

Australian rules footballer (born 1974)

Personal information
- Full name: Adam Kerinaiua
- Born: 17 June 1974 (age 52)
- Original team: North Darwin (NTFL)
- Height: 178 cm (5 ft 10 in)
- Weight: 72 kg (159 lb)

Playing career^{1}
Years	Club	Games (Goals)
1992	Brisbane Bears	3 (1)
- ^{1} Playing statistics correct to the end of 1992.

Adam Kerinaiua (born 17 June 1974) is a former Australian rules footballer who played with the Brisbane Bears in the Australian Football League (AFL).

Kerinaiua, a Tiwi Islander, was recruited from North Darwin in the Northern Territory Football League (NTFL). He played three of the final four rounds of the 1992 AFL season, aged just 18. In all three games he didn't find much of the ball but kicked a goal against Geelong.

He was a member of the Indigenous All-Stars team which defeated Collingwood in an exhibition match in 1994.
