= Hajime Toyoshima =

Imperial Japanese Navy airman (1920-1944)

- 豊嶋 一
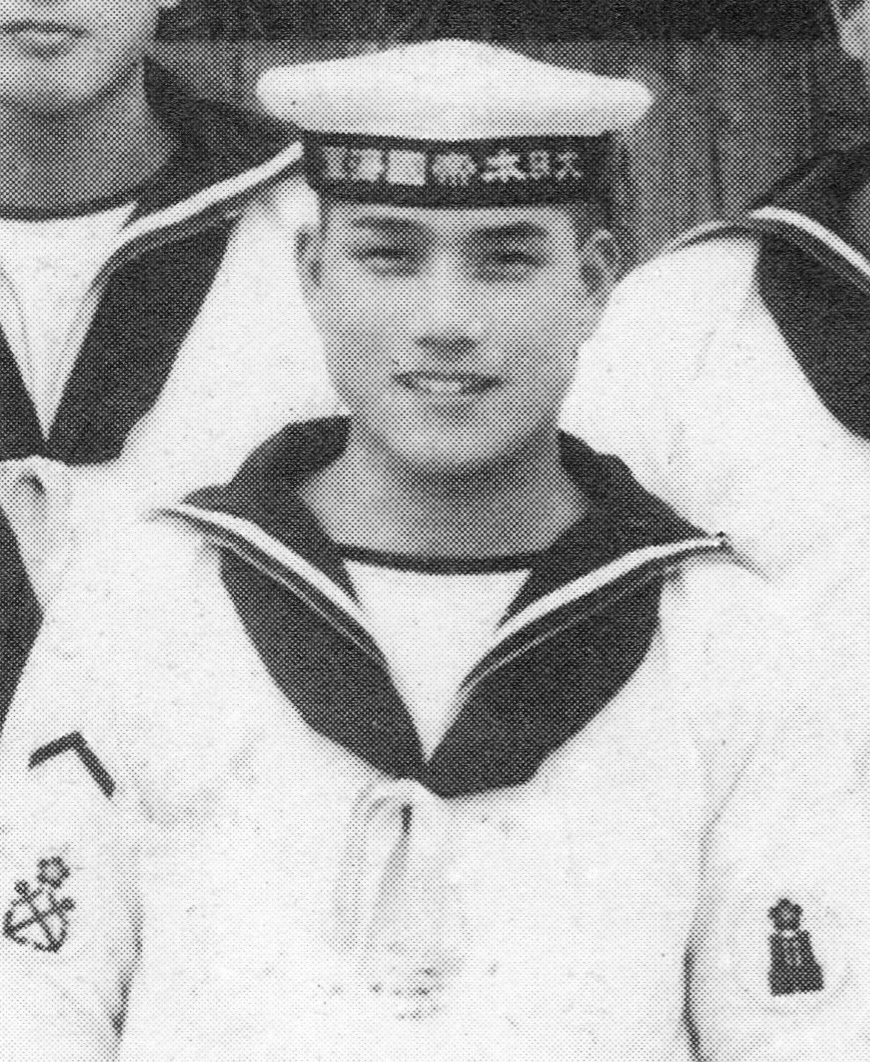
- Toyoshima in 1938
- Born: March 29, 1920; Kagawa Prefecture, Japan
- Died: August 5, 1944 (aged 24); Cowra, New South Wales, Australia
- Military career
- Allegiance: Empire of Japan
- Branch: Imperial Japanese Navy; Imperial Japanese Navy Air Service
- Service years: 1938–44
- Rank: Flight Petty Officer, Third Class (三等飛行兵曹 San-tō hikō heisō)
- Conflicts: World War II; Pacific War; Attack on Pearl Harbor; Battle of Wake Island; Battle of Ambon; Bombing of Darwin (POW)

Flight Petty Officer Third Class Hajime Toyoshima (豊嶋 一, Toyoshima Hajime; 29 March 1920 – 5 August 1944) was a Japanese airman in World War II. His A6M Zero was the first of that type to be recovered relatively intact on Allied territory (after those recovered after the attack on Pearl Harbor) when he crash landed on Melville Island, Northern Territory, Australia.

Toyoshima was the first Japanese prisoner of war to be captured in Australia. In August 1944, while a POW in rural New South Wales, Toyoshima was one of the instigators of the Cowra breakout, sounding a bugle to signal the commencement of the escape, and died during the fight.

== Early life ==
Hajime Toyoshima was born on March 29, 1920 (alternatively March 20, 1919) and had a brother named Tadao. Toyoshima was from Kagawa Prefecture and seems to have been reasonably intelligent and well educated - enough to be accepted into a pilot training school. Little else is known of Toyoshima's early life particularly as many records were destroyed during the war.

He is known (from Japanese records) to have flown in air patrols from Hiryū over the carrier fleet during the raid on Pearl Harbor. After the attack, Hiryū then attacked Wake Island and returned to Kure in Japan. On 12 January 1942, the carrier departed for the Dutch East Indies and participated in the Battle of Ambon. Carriers Hiryū and Sōryū then arrived at Palau on January 28 and waited for the arrival of the other carriers, Kaga and Akagi before departing on February 15.

== Raid on Darwin ==
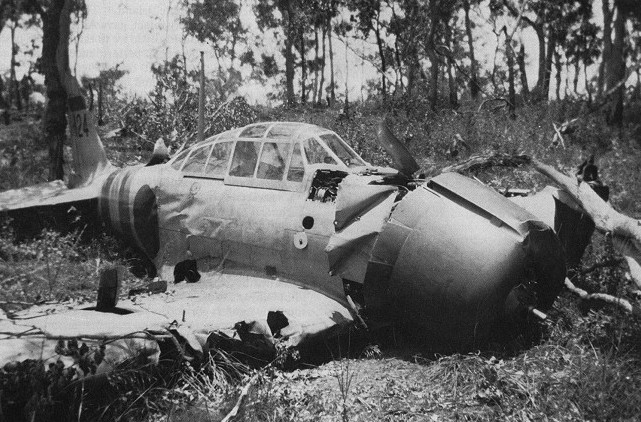
Toyoshima's crashed aircraft

Toyoshima took part of the February 19, 1942, Japanese air-raid on Darwin, Australia. His Zero, tail code BII-124, was launched from Hiryū which contributed 18 B5Ns, 18 D3As, and nine Zeros to the attack, which were joined by squadrons from the other carriers.

After an hour over Darwin, and while returning, he ran out of fuel due to bullet damage to his fuel tank, and crash-landed on Melville Island suffering superficial facial injuries. He then strove to move far away from the plane, understanding that the aircraft and a captured pilot would aid Allied Military intelligence. Before Toyoshima's crash, only nine Zeros had been shot down and the badly damaged wrecks were of little value.

On February 24, he was taken prisoner by local Tiwi islander Matthias Ulungura. becoming the first Japanese combatant to be captured in Australian territorial jurisdiction. His plane was found a few days after that, and was extensively studied (with the surviving wreck now preserved in the Darwin Aviation Museum). It was not connected to Toyoshima, since he told his captors he was a gunner from a bomber not involved in the raid and since he was now using the alias "Tadao Minami" (南忠男, Minami Tadao).

After being taken to an airbase on Bathurst Island, he was moved to Darwin, then to Melbourne by the RAAF for debriefing. He was then sent to the Loveday Camp on March 23. On April 9, he, alongside a few other captured airmen, was sent to civilian detention at the Hay internment and POW camps. From the outset of captivity, he actively sought to learn English, both from soldiers, local internees, and friendly guards. One Melbourne guard, a former policeman called Sam Shallard, stayed in contact with Toyoshima through letters after his move.

== Cowra breakout ==
Toyoshima arrived at the Cowra POW camp on 8 January 1943, and his airman status and developing English skill soon allowed him act as a leader and translator. A guard he befriended probably gave him an army bugle, made by Boosey and Hawkes Ltd of London, to practice with. Later, as many more Japanese POWs arrived, tensions increased due to overcrowding and power shifted towards the army and Toyoshima became a deputy leader.

In August 1944, after being informed of a mass prisoner transfer, Toyoshima signaled the start of the mass escape with a bugle call. Soon, many of the compound's buildings were alight and 1,100 prisoners were charging the fences and guard towers. In the chaos, he died (recorded as "Gun shot wound to chest and self-inflicted wound" to his throat) alongside 230 other Japanese in the breakout and his identity as a Zero pilot was not discovered until the 1960s.

He was buried as his alias, Tadao Minami, in the Japanese Cemetery at Cowra, the only official Japanese war grave outside Japan. His bugle was donated to the Australian War Memorial by the camp commander, Major Edward Timms, in 1978.

== See also ==
- Akutan Zero
