= Jane C. Goodale =

American anthropologist

Jane Carter Goodale
- Born: 1926; Boston, Massachusetts
- Died: November 5, 2008 (aged 81–82)

Academic background
- Education: Radcliffe College
- Alma mater: University of Pennsylvania

Academic work
- Discipline: Anthropology
- Sub-discipline: Ethnography
- Institutions: Bryn Mawr College

Jane Carter Goodale (1926–2008) was an American anthropologist, author, photographer, and professor who worked to bring attention to the roles of women in Oceania and Australia through her extensive research in the field of ethnography. Having written and co-written numerous books and articles, the most notable being Tiwi Wives (1971), To Sing with Pigs Is Human (1995), The Two-Party Line (1996), Goodale's achievements and contributions to her field continue to have major importance in the sociological role of women as well as in continuing the field of ethnography today. Goodale received her BA and MA from Radcliffe College and later her PhD from the University of Pennsylvania. Goodale began her teaching career at Bryn Mawr College as a part-time instructor in 1959, becoming a full professor in the department of Anthropology in 1975, and served there until her retirement in 1996, when she became Professor Emerita. She also held teaching positions at Barnard College, the University of Pennsylvania, and the Darwin Institute of Technology. Goodale worked to bring attention and notability to the ethnographic research, dedicating her work and encouraging her students in the collection of facts and information on other cultures during a time when many felt the practice was outdated and ineffective.

== Early life and education ==
Jane Carter Goodale was born in Boston, Massachusetts in 1926. The daughter of Susan Bainbridge Sturgis and Robert Lincoln Goodale, a prominent New England physician, Goodale grew up in a highly intellectual environment that greatly contributed to her interests, abilities, and later, to her career. Goodale's interest in genealogy, which was later emphasized in her work with the Tiwi, began at an early age within her own family lineage. Able to trace her family history back to the early 1630s in the New England area, Goodale was proud of her ancestors’ adventurous spirits and attributed her own ambitious nature to them. Her uncle, Eddie Goodale, journeyed with Admiral Byrd, the revolutionary American naval officer, explorer and aviator on his expeditions to the South Pole, which in part inspired Goodale's desire for travel and adventure. Goodale also noted the importance of other “illustrious ancestors” who influenced her ideas and ambitions early on in life such as Lucy Goodale Thurston, a missionary relative who travelled to Hawai’i in the early 1880s. The field of anthropology allowed Goodale to travel in a time when many women were not given such opportunities.

The skills that Goodale acquired from her were further encouraged and cultivated at Oldfields School, an all-girls school in Maryland from which she graduated in 1944. During her time at Oldfields, Goodale struggled as a student due to undiagnosed dyslexia. Her struggles at Oldfields greatly prepared Goodale for her future education, career, and especially mentorship that she would face later on in life. Goodale was able to get through her years at Oldfields with the help of her teacher Miss Anderson who acted as Goodale's mentor during her time in school. The mentoring Miss Anderson was able to provide for Goodale at Oldfields prepared her not only for her undergraduate and master's degrees but also when Goodale herself became mentor to her own students.

Goodale received her B.A. in 1948 and M.A. in 1951 from Radcliffe College. When she first started her undergraduate studies at Radcliffe University, she intended to study medicine or geography. She was encouraged by classmate Carleton S. Coon who was also a Harvard anthropologist and in her sophomore year she enrolled in anthropology, a move that changed her life tremendously. While still at Radcliffe University she co-founded the Harvard-Radcliffe Anthropology club with Robert Dyson and served as its first president.

Goodale received her Ph.D. from the University of Pennsylvania in 1959. While still a student at the University of Pennsylvania, she served as the newsletter editor for the venerable Philadelphia Anthropological Society. She would later on help found and preside over the Association for Social Anthropology in Oceania (ASAO), the premier organization of Pacific anthropologists. Before receiving her Ph.D. Goodale worked as Carleton Coon's assistant. When Coon declined Charles Mountford's invitation to join his National Geographic Society expedition and go to Melville Island to study the Australian Aboriginal population, Goodale took his place. She began her ten-month doctoral research in Australia in 1954 and she got her Ph.D. in 1959.

== Publications ==
Goodale published a variety of articles and texts during her career. The publishing of “Tiwi Wives,” allowed Goodale to develop her reputation and was one of her major works that demonstrated her research Goodale discusses the lives of Tiwi Women concerning the rituals throughout their lifetime Important rites of passage are discussed throughout the text and detailed material describing marriage and death traditions are mentioned This text has become relevant throughout anthropology; this work is often referenced as support in a variety of academic articles regarding traditions involving Northern Australian women when researched on academic search engines. “To Sing with Pigs is Human: The Concept of Person in Papua New Guinea” is another publication surrounding the research that Goodale undertook. The finding that Goodale discovers, when researching in New Guinea, is the importance of everything in the development of the recognition of human beings within the particular culture of the Kaulong. Every event, relationship, and transaction is considered to be important in the eyes of the Kaulong; Goodale researches to understand what makes an individual human. The Kaulong concerns, surrounding the identity of an individual, caused the creation of a continuum that ranges from non-human to the most respected level of humanity To achieve a greater placement on the scale, an individual must obtain higher knowledge Goodale researches this system through rituals such as song and dance explored in an ethnographic manner “The Two Party Line, Conversations in the Field” is another publication completed by Goodale along with the co-author Ann Chowning. This text repeats the theme of ethnographic research that has been so relevant in the career of Goodale. The importance of ethnographic data is presented throughout the publication. The book describes the details of learning about a specific culture through participant observation and interactive discourse. The text discusses the different occasions in which Goodale participated in research with other members of the anthropology society and gives details on her time spent in both Australia and New Guinea. Richard Scaglion, in association with the American Anthropologist describes the text as unique and capable of stimulating discussion on a vast array of topics among a contemporary audience.

== Influence ==
Goodale died on November 5, 2008, after suffering from complications due to pulmonary hypertension. Continuing her research until the day she died, Goodale had been living in hospice care while maintaining her work on Tiwi genealogies with the help of her assistant. After having taught in and helped to establish anthropology departments in various institutions across the US, Goodale's contribution to the field of ethnography was of considerable significance. Pulling the Right Threads, edited by Laura Zimmer-Tamakoshi, was published later in 2008. Written and contributed to by former students and colleagues of Goodale's, the final publication was meant as a collection of Goodale's ethnographic work and mentoring methods. The title came from Goodale's own explanation on how to best solve ethnographic and cultural questions. Pulling the Right Threads acts to commemorate Goodale's work as well as delve further into ethnographic work quoting:

As striking as Jane’s considerable body of writings on her research in Australia and Papua New Guinea (PNG) have been her generous commitment of time and ideas to students and colleagues and her evident empathy for the people she studies. The writers in this volume recognize and build on these seminal aspects of Jane’s work. They investigate the ways Jane has helped shape ethnographic and theoretical contributions in such fields as gender studies, the anthropology of aging, Pacific ethnography, and applied and development anthropology.

Goodale's personal interests and work in the area of gender studies brought attention to the changing roles of women, as well as having a long-lasting influence in the discipline of anthropology. This influence has been continued on by Goodale's students focusing on the importance of collecting accurate ethnographic data.
