= Tiwi people =

Australian aboriginal ethnic group

Tunuvivi
- Flag of the Tiwi people

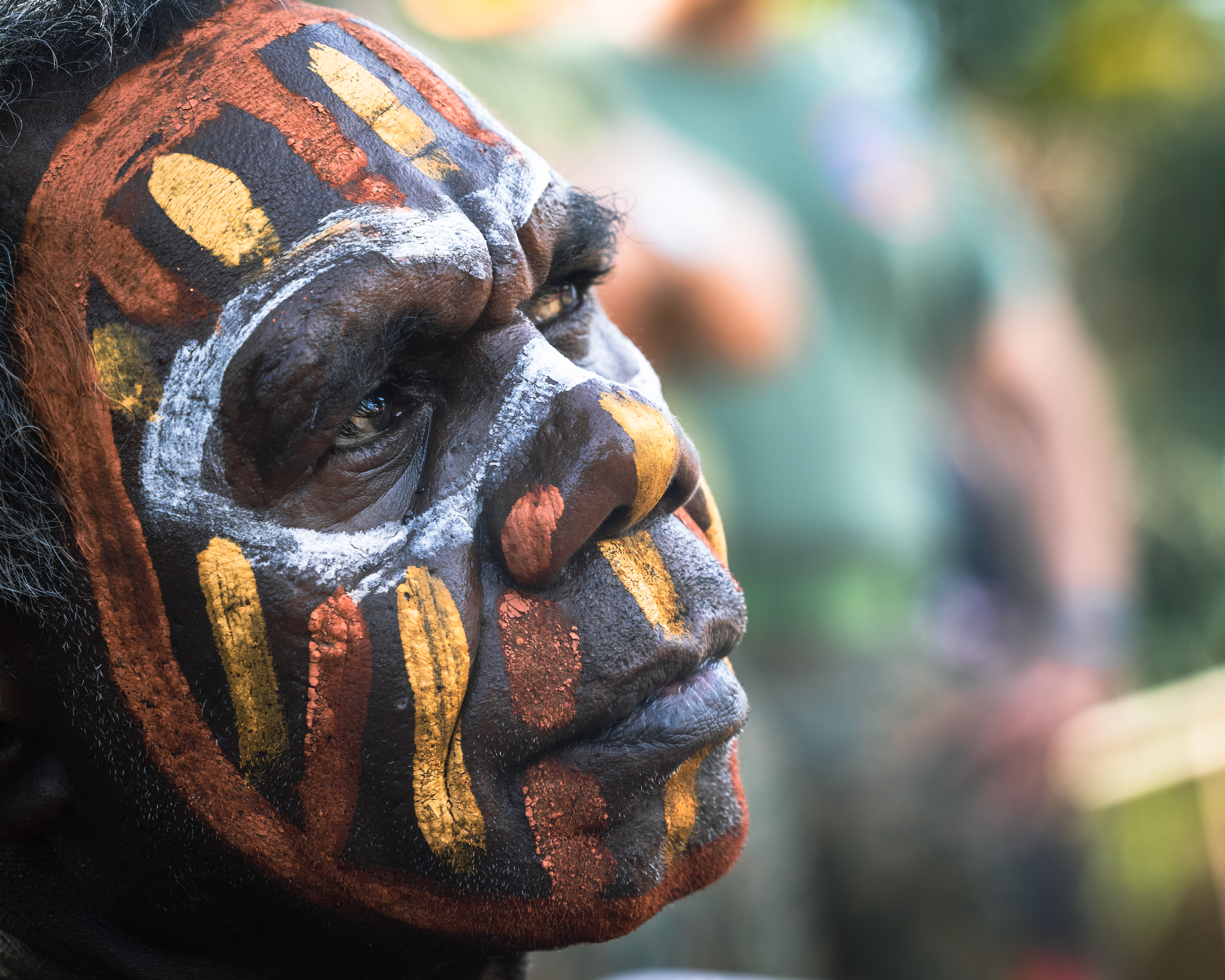
- A Mantiyupwi clan member of the Tiwi people during a traditional ceremony

Total population
- 2,000

Regions with significant populations
- Australia (Northern Territory)

Languages
- Tiwi, English (Australian English, Aboriginal Australian English)

Religion
- Roman Catholicism (Note: Jane C. Goodale, in her foundational work for Yale University's eHRAF, wrote that the "Catholic Church is a strong and consistent element of daily life" in the Tiwi Islands. (Goodale))

Related ethnic groups
- See List of Australian Aboriginal group names

The Tiwi people (or Tunuvivi (Note: Norman Tindale wrote: "The name Tiwi was coined for the convenience of anthropologists and others, it means 'We, the only people'; the late Father E. A. Worms gave me Tunuvivi as the ancient and proper name."(Tindale 1974, p. 236))) are one of the many Aboriginal groups of Australia. Nearly 2,000 Tiwi people live on the Tiwi Islands. The landmass of the Tiwi Islands is made up mainly of Bathurst and Melville Islands, both located about 48 kilometres (30 miles) from Darwin. The Tiwi language is a language isolate, with no apparent link to the languages of Arnhem Land or of other Aboriginal Australians beyond recent linguistic interaction as a result of the federal government's Stolen Generations relocation policies. Tiwi society is based on matrilineal descent, and marriage plays a very important part in many aspects of their lives. Art and music form an intrinsic part of their societal and spiritual rituals as the Tiwi people tend to follow a certain form of indigenous Dreamtime belief system alongside Roman Catholicism.

== Language ==
Tiwi, the most polysynthetic of all Australian languages, is a language isolate with no apparent genetic link to the contiguous languages of Arnhem Land on the Australian mainland. (Note: With one exception (a Torres Strait group) Tiwi is defined as "the most divergent language in the Australian linguistic area." (Dixon 2002, p. 251))

== Country ==
The Tiwi Islands lie about 80 kilometres (50 mi) from Darwin, with Melville and Bathurst Islands comprising about 8,344 square kilometres (3,222 sq mi) of land. These islands were originally called Ratuwati Yinjara, meaning "two islands". There are many other smaller uninhabited islands, most of which lie close to Melville and Bathurst, but Kulangana (South West Vernon Island) is less than 5 kilometres (3.1 mi) from the Australian mainland coast.

== History ==
=== Pre-colonisation ===
The Tunuvivi (or Tiwi) people are thought to first inhabit the islands around 40,000 years ago, and to have developed in relative cultural and geographical isolation.

In Tiwi Mythology an "old blind woman named Mudangkala created the Tiwi islands. She rose up from the sea cradling three infants. As she crawled in the dark, the sea and land filled the imprints of her body. She populated the islands with flora and fauna to create a beautiful home for her children, who would become the Tiwi.".

=== Contact with foreigners ===
From around the 1600s, there is evidence of trade between the Tunuvivi and Chinese and Makassan traders but no evidence has been found of permanent settlement.

Navigators of the Dutch East India Company landed on Melville Island in 1705, but did not colonise it then nor in succeeding voyages.

Other European explorers who visited the islands were Dutchman Pieter Pieterszoon, Frenchman Nicholas Baudin and Briton Philip Parker King.

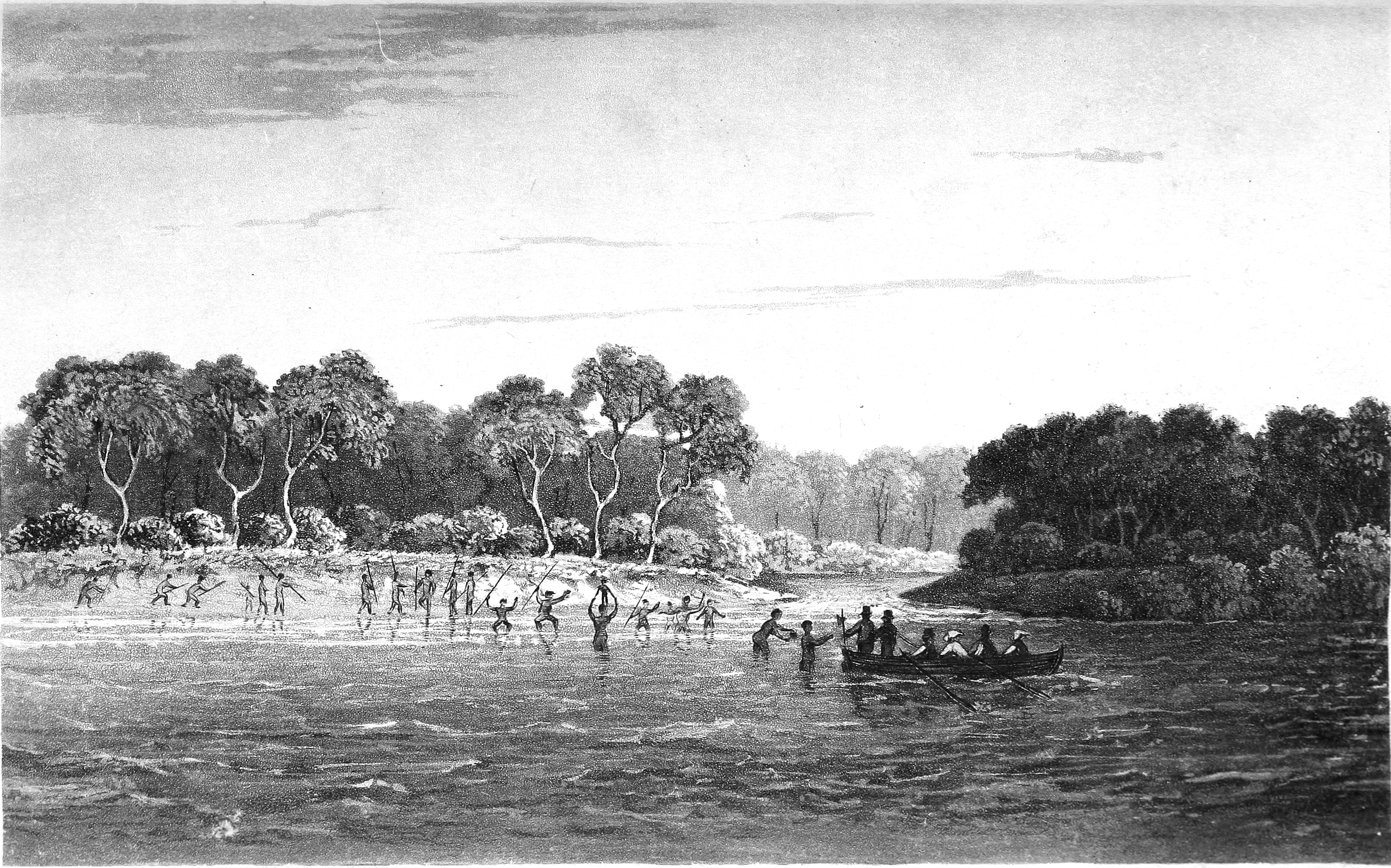
Sketch of P.P. King making contact with the Tiwi at St Asaph Bay, Melville Island, in 1818

King's visit in 1818 was the first British expedition to interact with the Tiwi Islanders. King named Melville Island, Bathurst Island and Apsley Strait on this journey.

=== Attempted British colonisation ===
In 1824, Captain Gordon Bremer was instructed by the British Colonial Office, to take possession of Bathurst and Melville Islands. He established a British military outpost, which was also the first British settlement in northern Australia, at Fort Dundas on Melville Island, near present-day Pirlangimpi. Subsequent conflict between the Tiwi and the Royal marines, as well as disease, resulted in Fort Dundas being abandoned in 1828.

=== Buffalo hunters and missionaries ===
After the abandonment of Fort Dundas in 1828, no further meaningful foreign incursions occurred into the Tiwi Islands until the 1890s. By this time, the water buffalo that had been left by the British on Melville Island, had proliferated and a potential market for their meat and hides was identified. The Tiwi Islanders, however, were still regarded by the British as a fierce people and an 1888 police report stated an armed force of around twenty men would be required "to exterminate the inhabitants and gain possession of Melville Island".

In 1895, Joe Cooper led an armed expedition to Melville Island assisted by "a small tribe of mainland blacks" to establish a buffalo shooting station. Cooper harvested thousands of buffalo until 1896 when buffalo numbers reduced and the shooters also faced increased Tiwi resistance, resulting in Cooper leaving the island.

Before leaving, Cooper had kidnapped several young Tiwi men and women and infants. He used these people upon his return in 1905 as envoys and bargaining tools to ensure a peaceful re-entry. He also brought with him a group of around 20 Iwaidja men from the Cobourg Peninsula, armed with Martini-Henry rifles, who acted as his bodyguard, personal militia and buffalo shooters.

Cooper established his head-station at Paru and his riflemen (referred to as Tarula or "lightning" by the Tiwi) subjugated the Tiwi by rape, murder and abduction. Cooper was able to maintain his brutal control until a government inquiry in 1914 forced him and his Iwaidja militia off the island.

The arrival of missionaries in 1911 overseen by the German Catholic missionary Bishop Francis Xavier Gsell saw the construction of the first mission at Nguiu (present-day Wurrumiyanga) with the help of two local Tiwi men.

Subsequent intervention by the Australian government during the 20th century saw many Indigenous people brought to the Tiwi Islands who were not of direct Tiwi descent, a group commonly referred to as the Stolen Generations.

=== World War 2 ===
During World War II, the Tiwi Islands became involved in the conflict between Imperial Japan and Australia during the bombings of Darwin in 1942. A Tiwi Islander named Matthias Ulungura disarmed and captured Japanese pilot Hajime Toyoshima, who had crash landed his damaged aircraft on Melville Island, the first Japanese military personnel to be taken captive on Australian soil. Later in the war, another Tiwi man named Louie captured a further five downed Japanese pilots.

=== Self determination and land rights ===
Some Tiwi men were employed in Darwin during WW2 by the army as labourers, where they experienced relatively good rates of pay. After the war these conditions were removed and several Tiwi men became involved in the first Aboriginal labour strikes to be organised in the Northern Territory. A Tiwi man named Tommy Playup-Jimmy was one of the leaders of what became known as the Corroboree Strikes.

After the introduction of land rights legislation, control of the Tiwi Islands was eventually transferred to the Tiwi traditional owners through the Tiwi Aboriginal Land Trust, and the Tiwi Land Council that was founded in 1978.

== Kinship ==
Another thing that impressed me was the Tiwis' deep spirit of faith and their total acceptance of me, a stranger. Another indelible memory is my recollection of the fervour with which they launched into numerous hymns during Mass and their evident love for Our Lady. Their sense of fun and their inexhaustible fund of patience left me with a deep sense of wonder and appreciation.

— Sister Christopher Keane on the characteristics of the Tiwi people.

The Tiwi come from a matrilineal descent group, which the Tiwi call "skin". This group of "skin" believe pregnancy comes from spirits. The Tiwi believe these spirits are unborn, coming from bodies of water. This traditional belief system from the Tiwi explains how the man has no physical role in birth, but a male's role is to find a spirit and uncover it, so that it is sent to the wife. The kin clan must be the same for the spirit as the wife. All Tiwi members have a general kinship to each other. This is separated into "close" and "far away" kinship which refers to the distance geographically between the Tiwi people. A band unit, which is smaller, is determined by somebody's sex or marriage. This means people such as a mother, father, or husband are considered one's close kin. With this said, acceptance into Tiwi society is often very loose, with traditional Tiwi members naming newcomers in the society as "son" and "daughter." This is known as a "far away" kinship where other races were often still considered as outsiders to traditional Tiwi people.

== Marriage ==
Marriage roles of the Tiwi plays an important role for economic, social and political status. The Tiwi consider marriage as a very important aspect of their livelihoods, as almost all people get married, especially women. Tiwi culture places great emphasis on the importance of marriage in women's lives. Since both the men and women come from a matrilineal descent group, wives' descent group is important. Remarriage of a widow is common for the traditional Tiwi, which allows the less promising hunters to be married. This is because widows have to remarry quickly, which had to be immediately after the husband dies. Traditionally, remarriage occurred at the gravesite of the previous husband. Since the more promising husbands were usually claimed, older women often ended up with younger, less experienced men. Bestowal is often used in the Tiwi culture, which is the main way of receiving young wives. Successful men, usually older, often had many wives, even up to 20 for very promising husbands. Men younger than 30 often had fewer or no wives. In traditional Tiwi culture, ages 30–40 were the most likely to be married to widows. Older women had great importance in the society, mainly because of the necessity for food in Tiwi society. The older women tend to be more familiar with the gathering skills, helping ensure food supply is not a problem for the household. On the other hand, less experienced women created problems for the household, as they were less adept at gathering food. Younger women often acted like apprentices, learning all the possible ways of gathering food from older women to please their husband or household. Even though this traditional marriage culture is still very prevalent in modern Tiwi culture, marriage has changed juristically because of Catholic missionaries beginning to settle on Tiwi land after 1945. According to culture sketches, the power dynamic of men and women both had their advantages. While men had a lot more political power, women were well respected for their gathering skills to provide food and favours.

=== Marriage restrictions between skin groups ===
Tiwi skin groups face restrictions on which other skin groups they can marry into. This is because certain skin groups are considered too closely related to others, so traditional rules around permissible intermarriage helps prevent excess endogamy.

Tiwi Skin Group Marriage Rules
Native Skin Group	Eligible Spousal Skin Group	Ineligible Spousal Skin Group
Wantarringuwi	Takaringuwi; Miyartiwi	Marntimapila
Miyartiwi	Wantarringuwi; Marntimapila	Takaringuwi
Marntimapila	Takaringuwi; Miyartiwi	Wantarringuwi
Takaringuwi	Marntimapila; Wantarringuwi	Miyartiwi

Each skin group also has a related natural emblem. For Wantarringuwi it is the sun, for Miyartiwi it is pandanus, for Marntimapila it is rock, and for Takaringuwi it is the mullet.

== Food ==
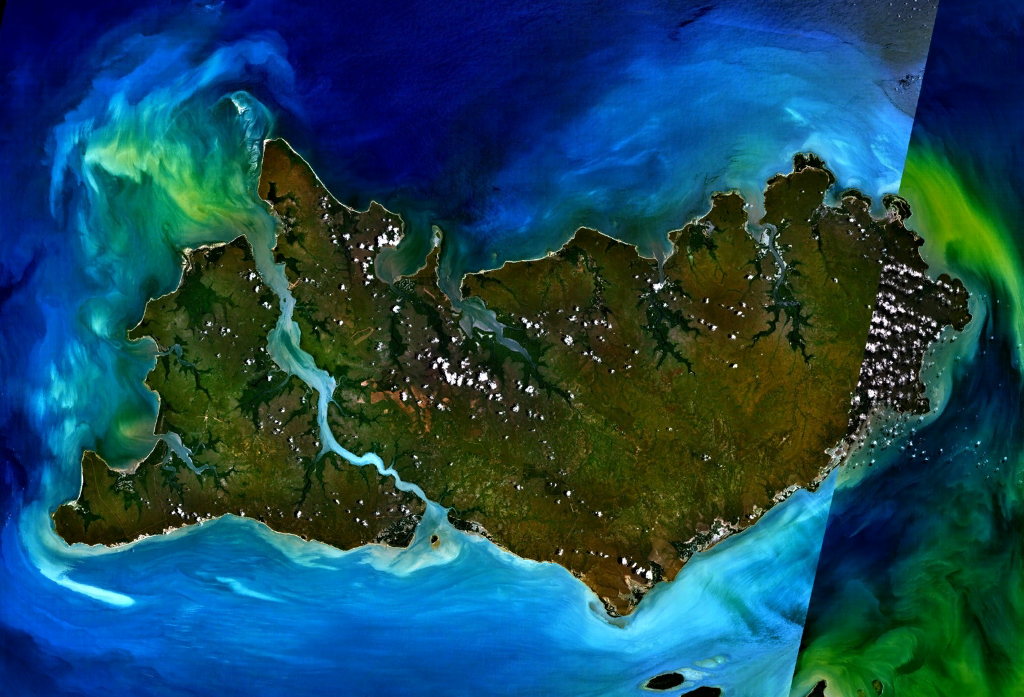
Tiwi Islands, 2005.

The land on both Bathurst Island and Melville Island is heavily forested and hunting for food is still an important part of Tiwi life. On land, the Tiwi people hunt for wallaby, lizards, possums, carpet snakes, pig, buffalo, flying foxes, bandicoot, turtle and seagull eggs and magpie geese. From the sea they hunt for turtle, crocodiles, dugong and fish. When the Tiwi people are locating food in the bush, they never take the mothers or the juveniles in an effort to show respect for the land and conserve the environment.

== Beliefs ==
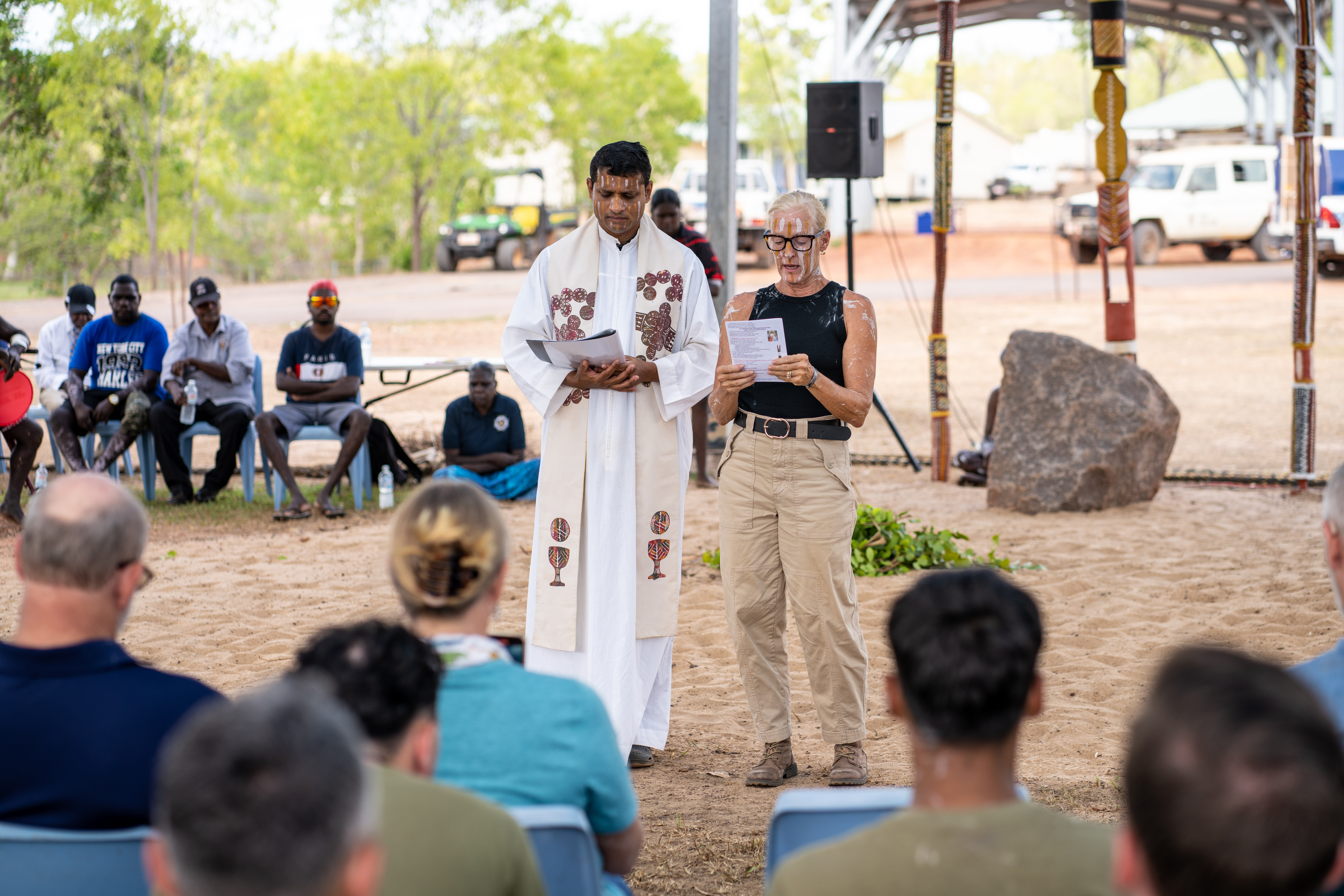
Wurrumiyanga Parish priest wearing traditional Tiwi pigments alongside the vestments of Roman Catholicism, part of a Tiwi pukumani mourning ceremony held for the families of U.S. personnel

Tiwi inherit their totemic dance, evocative of the dreamtime traditional belief system and which defines their spiritual identity from their father. Dancing, or yoi as they call it, is a part of everyday life. Narrative dances are performed to depict this everyday life or historical events. When German Catholic missionary Francis Xavier Gsell arrived around the first decade of the 20th century, Tiwi locals were somewhat reticent about converting to Roman Catholicism. Gsell himself did not exert undue pressure on the Tiwi people, even sending one eager prospective convert back to her family so as to not interfere with tribal custom. However, his accommodating approach during his time on the islands ultimately succeeded, firmly establishing the Tiwi people as Catholics; in contemporary Tiwi Islands society there remains in effect a moratorium on building any religious structure that is not Catholic. The Tiwi people also continue to use the Lorraine Cross of Gsell's native Alsace–Lorraine as a motif on their pukumani poles and in their traditional printing.

== Culture ==
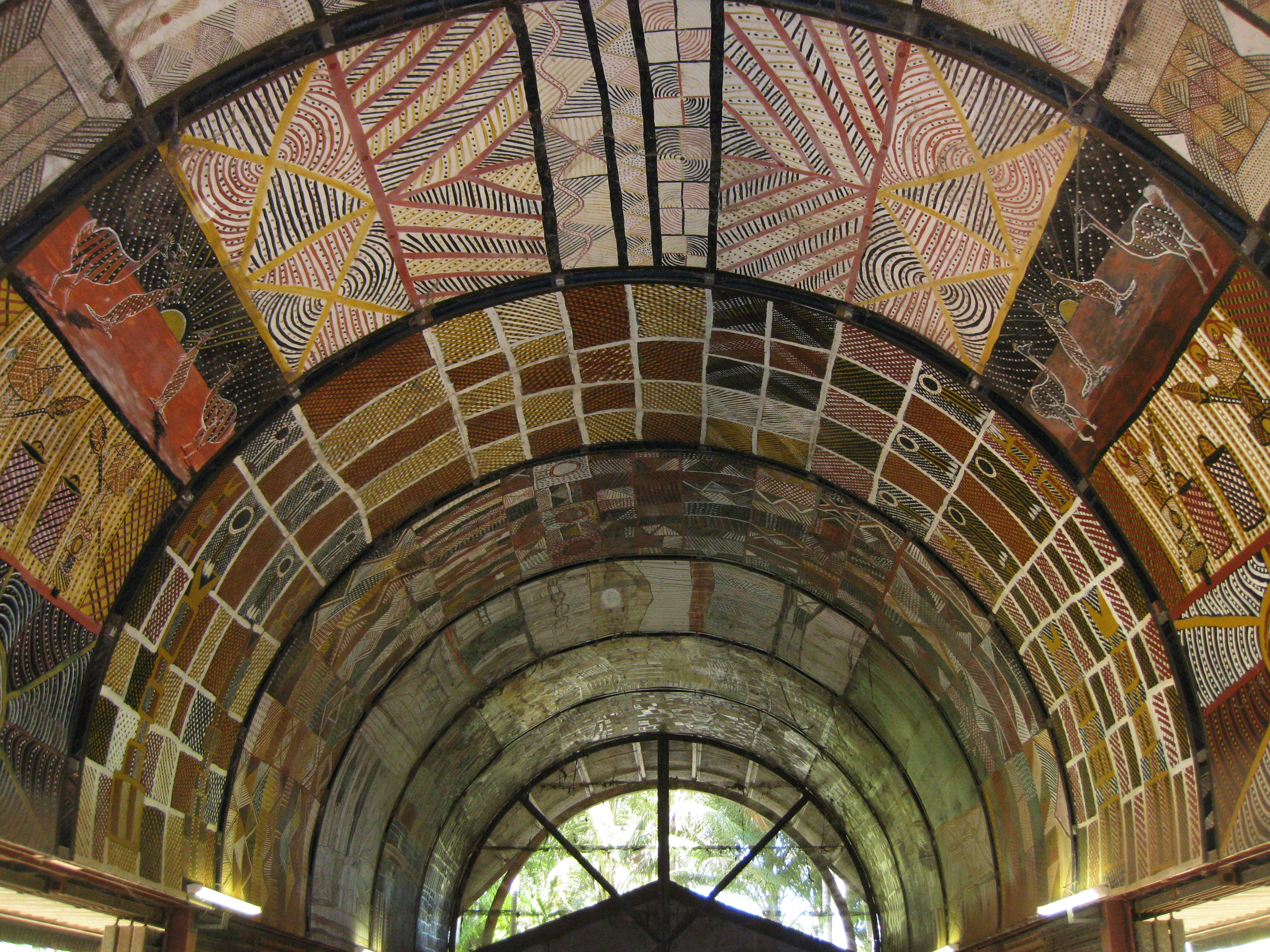
Ceiling of a Tiwi Island art gallery and studio, 2011.

=== Art ===
Compared with Arnhem Land art, Tiwi art often appears to be abstract and geometric. With its strong patterns and use of colour, Tiwi art is considered very attractive and highly collectible. Tiwi art is used to tell stories, and the hatch patterns represent friendships within the community. Many art experts worldwide have studied Tiwi art and have analysed the meaning of Tiwi symbols. Tiwi art forms an integral part of the oral tradition passing on history and wisdom through generations.

English is taught in some schools as a second language, and the Tiwi communicate principally in their own language. When in mourning, it is part of their beliefs to paint their body and express their love for whomever has passed through music, art and dance. Painting has been practised for thousands of years as a part of ceremonies and the Tiwi pukumani totem poles are famous and have been sold all over the world. Tiwi typically use natural ochre pigments which are found in the local environment. When a person dies, in Tiwi culture their name becomes taboo. According to traditional Tiwi beliefs, for the many years that pass as the spirit returns to the land, one cannot say the name of the person.

=== Music ===
Music has formed an integral part, of all aspects of life on the Tiwi islands, being centred around the Tiwi initiation ceremony, kulama (yam), but the innovative use of song on such occasions is now at risk given the weakening of the customary rituals that engendered its creativity.

The Tiwi people sing songs about the land which have been handed down through the generations. They sing about many aspects of their lives, including hunting, cooking, family, animals, plants and the Australian outback. Some of these songs have been recorded and archived and some performances by Tiwi women have been held at a number of important venues in Australia. The Tiwi "strong women's group" are involved in a collaborative project to conserve their music on Bathurst and Melville islands. Research projects have also led to a revival of some of the oldest Tiwi songs; due to the importance of these songs which have been sung for thousands of years, the research must be carried out with the strictest sensitivity.

=== Yiloga (Australian rules football) ===
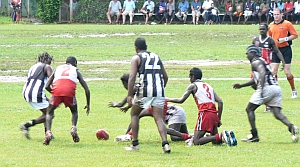
Tiwi Islands Football League Grand Final 05/06 at Stanley Tipiloura Oval, Wurrumiyanga. Mulluwurri vs Pumurali

Yiloga (Australian rules football) has become an important part of Tiwi culture and is by far the most popular sport. The Tiwi Islands Football League (TIFL) is the main league and the TIFL Grand Final is the largest event on the island, attracting up to 3,000 spectators, equivalent to the entire Tiwi population. The Tiwi have their own semi-professional Northern Territory Football League club, the Tiwi Bombers. Tiwis have been enormously successful in the national fully professional Australian Football League, with around a third of the Territorians playing in the league coming from the two islands.

== Notable people ==
- Janet Baird, Australian rules footballer
- Manuel Brown, Australian politician
- Ronnie Burns, Australian rules footballer
- Lawrence Costa, Australian politician
- David Kantilla, Australian rules footballer
- Adam Kerinaiua, Australian rules footballer
- Sean Lemmens, Australian rules footballer
- Ben Long, Australian rules footballer
- Michael Long, Australian rules footballer
- Malcolm Lynch, Australian rules footballer
- Anthony McDonald-Tipungwuti, Australian rules footballer
- Shannon Motlop, Australian rules footballer
- Tommy Playup-Jimmy, civil rights campaigner leading up to the Corroboree Strikes
- Danielle Ponter, Australian rules footballer
- Cyril Rioli, Australian rules footballer
- Daniel Rioli, Australian rules footballer
- Dean Rioli, Australian rules footballer
- Maurice Rioli, Australian rules footballer
- Maurice Rioli Jr., Australian rules footballer
- Willie Rioli, Australian rules footballer
- Brian Stanislaus, Australian rules footballer
- Matthias Ulungura, World War 2 hero
- Austin Wonaeamirri, Australian rules footballer

== Sources ==
- "Tiwi - Summary - eHRAF World Cultures". Yale University.
- Puwanikimawu Gardiner, Anne (2011). We Are Wiser For Their Words. Nguiu Nginingawila Literature Production. ISBN 978-1-921576-02-7.
- Rossingh, Bronwyn (2014). "Tiwi Islands Skin Group Project" (PDF). Report, Australian Centre for Indigenous Knowledges and Education, Australia. Charles Darwin University.
- Campbell, Genevieve (2013). "Ngarukuruwala – we sing: the songs of the Tiwi Islands, northern Australia". PhD Thesis, University of Sydney, Australia. University of Sydney doctoral thesis.
- Dixon, Robert M. W. (2002). Australian Languages: Their Nature and Development. Vol. 1. Cambridge University Press. ISBN 978-0-521-47378-1.
- Goodale, J. G. (1962). "Marriage contracts among the Tiwi". Ethnology. 1 (4): 452–466. doi:10.2307/3772851. JSTOR 3772851.
- Goodale, J. G. (1971). Tiwi wives.
- Hart, C. W. (July 1930). "The Tiwi of Melville and Bathurst Islands". Oceania. 1 (2): 167–180. doi:10.1002/j.1834-4461.1930.tb01643.x. JSTOR 40327319.
- Hart, Charles William Merton; Pilling, Arnold R. (1960). The Tiwi of North Australia. Holt. ISBN 978-0-030-05700-7.
- Peters-Golden, Holly (1997). Culture Sketches: Case Studies in Anthropology (2nd ed.). McGraw-Hill. ISBN 978-0-070-49715-3.
- Tindale, Norman Barnett (1974). "Tunuvivi (Tiwi) (NT)". Aboriginal Tribes of Australia: Their Terrain, Environmental Controls, Distribution, Limits, and Proper Names. Australian National University. ISBN 978-0-708-10741-6.
- "The Tiwi Islands". Tiwi Land Council.
- Venbrux, Eric (1995). A death in the Tiwi islands: conflict, ritual, and social life in an Australian aboriginal community. Cambridge University Press. ISBN 978-0-521-47351-4.
- Weeks, Jonny (12 February 2016). "'You're not given any love': the stories of Australia's stolen generations – photo essay". The Guardian.
