= Tiwi Islands =

Island group of the Northern Territory, Australia

Tiwi Islands (Ratuati Irara)
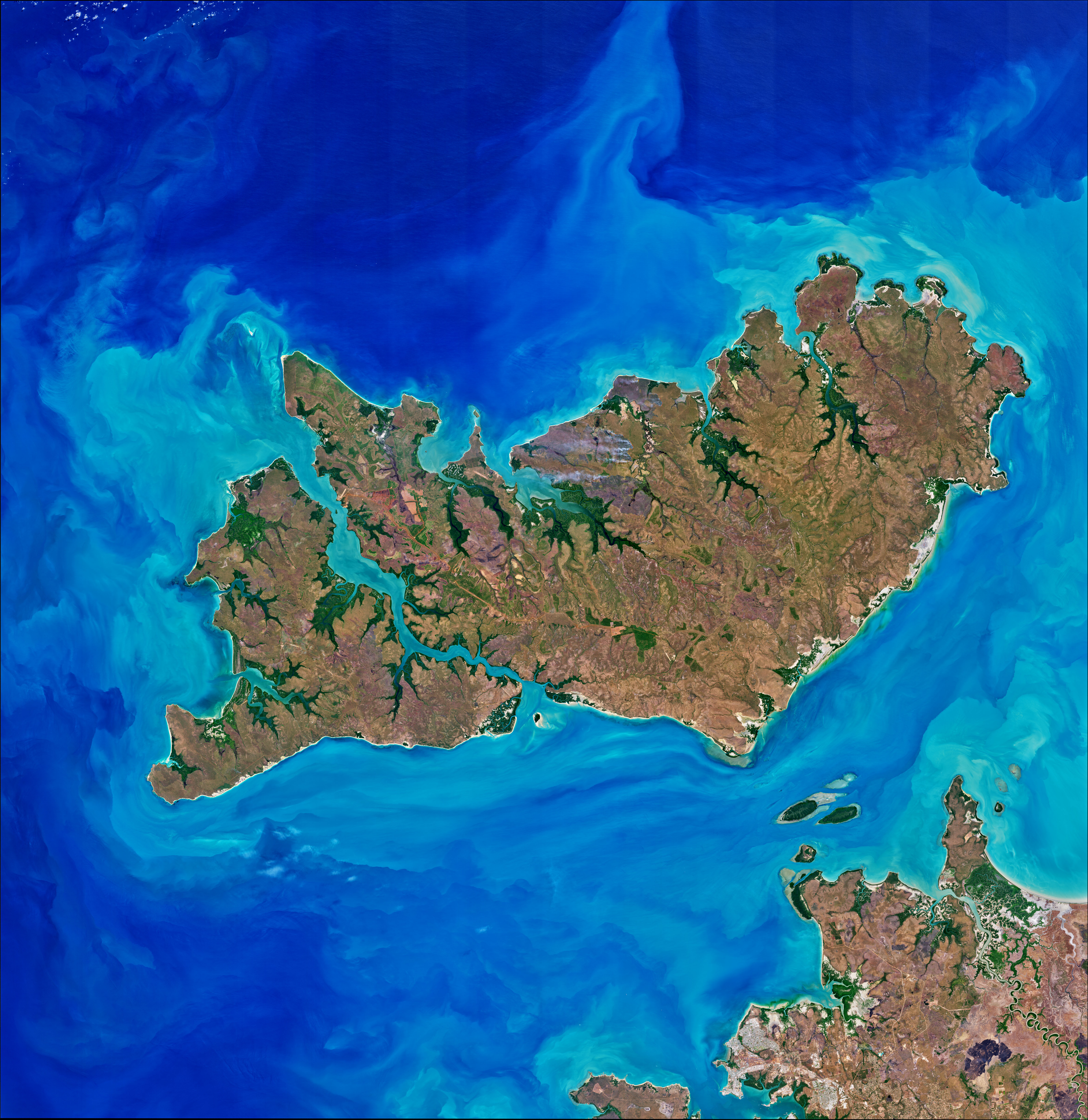
- Satellite image of the Tiwi Islands, Melville (top right) and Bathurst (left) with the Australian mainland (bottom right)

- Location within Northern Territory Location within Australia

Geography
- Location: Timor Sea
- Coordinates: 11°36′S 130°49′E
- Total islands: 11
- Major islands: Melville Island; Bathurst Island
- Area: 8,320 km^{2} (3,210 sq mi)
- Coastline: 1,016 km (631.3 mi)

Administration
- Australia
- State or territory: Northern Territory
- LGA: Tiwi Islands Region

Demographics
- Population: 2,348 (2021 census)
- Languages: Tiwi
- Ethnic groups: Tiwi

Additional information
- Official website: www.tiwiislands.nt.gov.au
- Flag of the Tiwi Islands (Tiwi: pantirra Ratuati Irara).

The Tiwi Islands (Tiwi: Ratuati Irara meaning 'two islands') are part of the Northern Territory, Australia, 80 km (50 mi) to the north of Darwin adjoining the Timor Sea. They comprise Melville Island, Bathurst Island, and nine smaller uninhabited islands, with a combined area of 8,320 square kilometres (3,212 sq mi).

Inhabited before European settlement by the Tiwi (Tiwi: Tunuvivi), an Aboriginal Australian people, the islands' population was 2,348 at the 2021 census. National Geographic has characterised contemporary Tiwi Islands society as reflecting an enduring fusion between the indigenous Tiwi people's traditional beliefs and these later European settlers' Catholicism.

The Tiwi Land Council is one of four land councils in the Northern Territory. It is a representative body with statutory authority under the Aboriginal Land Rights (Northern Territory) Act 1976, and has responsibilities under the Native Title Act 1993 and the Pastoral Land Act 1992.

== Geography and population ==
The Tiwi Islands were created by sea level rise at the end of the last ice age, which ended about 11,700 years ago, with the flooding occurring an estimated 8,200 to 9,650 years ago. The story of the flooding is told in Tiwi traditional stories and creation myths passed down orally from generation to generation ever since.

The islands are located in the Northern Territory about 80 kilometres (50 mi) to the north of the Australian mainland and are bounded by the Timor Sea in the north and the west, in the south by the Beagle Gulf, the Clarence Strait and Van Diemen Gulf and in the east by the Dundas Strait.

The island group consists of two large inhabited islands (Melville and Bathurst), and nine smaller uninhabited islands (Buchanan, Harris, Seagull, Karslake, Irritutu, Clift, Turiturina, Matingalia and Nodlaw). Bathurst Island is the fifth-largest island of Australia and accessible by sea and air. Melville Island is Australia's second largest island (after Tasmania).

The main islands are separated by Apsley Strait, which connects Saint Asaph Bay in the north and Shoal Bay in the south, and is between 550 m (1,800 ft) and 5 km (3.1 mi) wide, 62 km (39 mi) long. At the mouth of Shoal Bay is Buchanan Island, with an area of about 3 km^{2} (1.2 sq mi). A car ferry at the narrowest point provides a quick connection between Melville and Bathurst Islands.

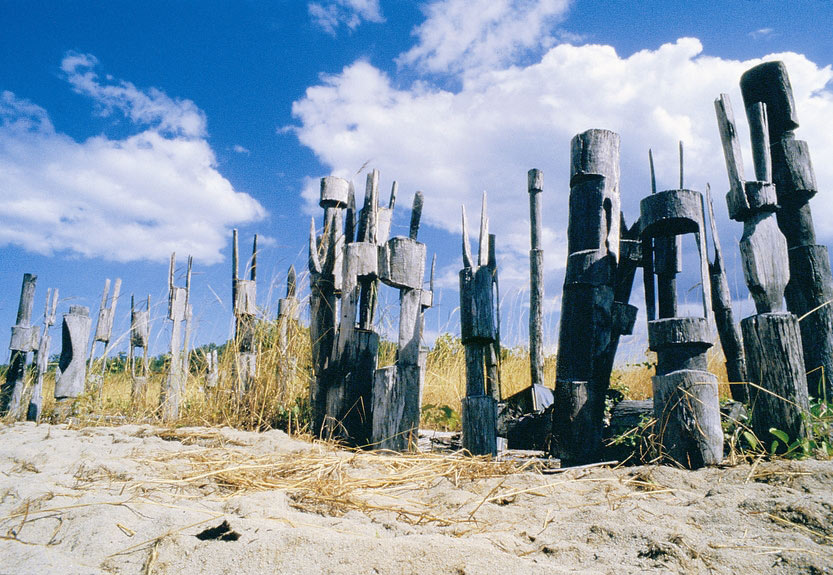
Traditional burial poles, Tiwi Islands, 2005.

They have been inhabited by the Tiwi people for thousands of years, since long before European settlement in Australia. The Tiwi are an Aboriginal Australian people, culturally and linguistically distinct from those of Arnhem Land on the mainland just across the water. In 2021, the total population of the islands was 2,348, of whom 87% were Aboriginal people. Most residents speak Tiwi as their first language and English as a second language.

Most of the population live in Wurrumiyanga (known as Nguiu until 2010) on Bathurst Island, and Pirlangimpi (also known as Garden Point) and Milikapiti (also known as Snake Bay) on Melville Island. Wurrumiyanga has a population of nearly 1500, the other two centres around 450 each. There are other smaller settlements, including Wurankuwu (Ranku) Community on western Bathurst Island. According to an economic report commissioned by the Northern Territory Government, fewer than one in ten Tiwi Islanders live away from these major settlements in rural locales across the two main islands.

Population on the Tiwi Islands
location	percentage
Bathurst Island urban centres	57.9
Melville Island urban centres	33.3
Rural areas across Tiwi Islands	8.8
(in 2011)

== History ==
=== Indigenous ===
The Aboriginal Tiwi people have occupied the area that became the Tiwi Islands for at least 40,000 years, with creation stories relating their presence on the islands at least 7,000 years before present.

=== Early contact with foreigners ===
Tiwi Islanders are believed to have had contact with Macassan traders, and the first historical record of contact between Indigenous islanders and European explorers was with the Dutch "under the command of Commander Maarten van Delft who took three ships, the Nieuw Holland, the Waijer, and the Vosschenbosch, into Shark Bay on Melville Island and landed on 30 April 1705". Van Delft remained at the Tiwi Islands for a few months but was eventually forced off after skirmishing with the Islanders resulting in two of his sailors being wounded.

Claims that the pre-colonial Tiwi Islands were raided by slave traders from Portuguese Timor have been made since the early 19th century, sometimes in support of the unorthodox theory of the Portuguese discovery of Australia. Early British sources cited Portuguese slave raids as a source of the supposed hostility of Tiwi Islanders to intruders, and recounted anecdotal evidence of Tiwi Islanders who spoke words of Portuguese. However, no direct evidence exists of these practices in Portuguese sources or in Tiwi oral tradition.

There were other visits by European explorers and navigators in the seventeenth, eighteenth and nineteenth centuries, including by Dutchman Pieter Pieterszoon, Frenchman Nicholas Baudin and Briton Philip Parker King.

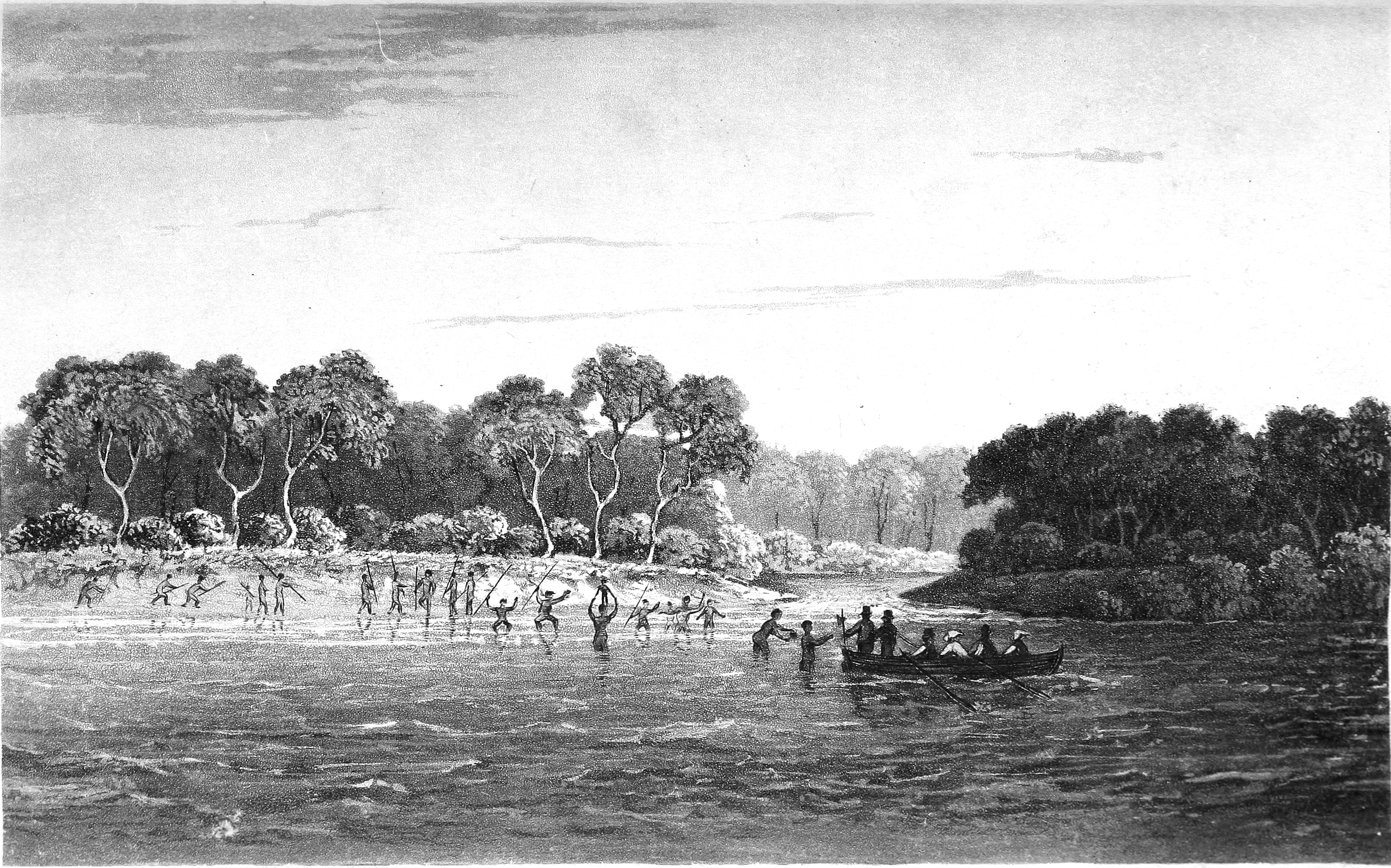
Sketch of P.P. King making contact with the Tiwi at St Asaph Bay, Melville Island, in 1818

King's was the first British expedition to interact with the Tiwi Islanders. Although the meeting of the two peoples was tense, iron tools were traded by the British for fish, water and sago. King named Melville Island, Bathurst Island and Apsley Strait on this journey.

=== British colonial outpost ===
In February 1824 Captain Gordon Bremer was appointed by the Admiralty, upon instruction from the British Colonial Office, to take possession of Bathurst and Melville Islands, along with the Cobourg Peninsula (now part of Arnhem Land) on the mainland to the east, subject to the land being unoccupied by any people except "...the Natives of those or any of the other Eastern Islands". In September 1824, Bremer established a British military outpost, which was also the first British settlement in northern Australia, at Fort Dundas on Melville Island, near present-day Pirlangimpi. Fifty Royal marines were garrisoned at the fort and within a month hostilities resulted in an Islander being shot dead. Over the next four years the Tiwi speared the livestock, tore down British huts and killed three white men. Several marines also died of malaria and Fort Dundas was subsequently abandoned in 1828. As "the first attempted European and military settlement anywhere in northern Australia", the site is on Australia's Register of the National Estate.

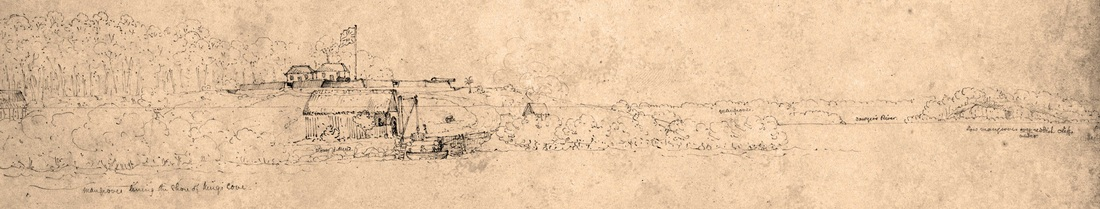
Sketch of Fort Dundas by John Septimus Roe in 1824

Despite the failure of the settlement, Bremer had claimed the northern area of the continent and adjacent islands as part of New South Wales (then under Governor Thomas Brisbane). Jurisdiction of the Northern Territory, including the Tiwi Islands was taken over by the Government of the Colony of South Australia by instruction from the Colonial Office in 1863.

=== Buffalo shooters ===
After the abandonment of Fort Dundas in 1828, no further meaningful foreign incursions occurred into the Tiwi Islands until the 1890s. By this time, the water buffalo that had been left by the British on Melville Island, had proliferated and a potential market for their meat and hides was identified. The Tiwi Islanders, however, were still regarded by the British as a fierce people and an 1888 police report stated an armed force of around twenty men would be required "to exterminate the inhabitants and gain possession of Melville Island".

In 1895, Edward Oswin Robinson, Barney Flynn and Joe Cooper led an armed expedition to Melville Island assisted by "a small tribe of mainland blacks" to establish a buffalo shooting station. Within a few months, Cooper had been speared by the Tiwi but not mortally wounded. The harvesting of thousands of buffalo continued until 1896 when buffalo numbers reduced and the shooters also faced increased Tiwi resistance, resulting in Cooper and the others leaving the island.

Cooper returned to Melville Island with his brother Harry in 1905 to resume the buffalo shooting business. Before leaving the island in 1896, Cooper had kidnapped several young Tiwi men and women and infants. He used these people upon his return in 1905 as envoys and bargaining tools to ensure a peaceful re-entry. He also brought with him a group of around 20 Iwaidja men from the Cobourg Peninsula, armed with Martini-Henry rifles, who acted as his bodyguard, personal militia and buffalo shooters.

Cooper established his head-station at Paru and his riflemen (referred to as Tarula or "lightning" by the Tiwi) subjugated the Tiwi by rape, murder and abduction. Cooper was able to maintain his brutal control until a government inquiry in 1914 forced him and his Iwaidja militia off the island.

=== Catholic mission ===
Just before the South Australian government handed over the Territory to the Federal Government of Australia in 1911, it gave notice that up to 5,000 acres of land was available north of the 18th parallel south, which included land on Bathurst Island. In September 1910 the German Catholic missionary Francis Xavier Gsell applied for a license to establish a Christian mission in a similar way to land grants made in British New Guinea. In the same month the South Australian government declared the whole of Bathurst Island an Aboriginal reserve, and granted 10,000 acres (4,000 ha) for the mission. After earlier making his vows as a Missionary of the Sacred Heart, Bishop Francis Xavier Gsell had already become familiar with the wider region, having spent time in New South Wales in the 1890s, followed by time in New Guinea. Before his relocation to the Tiwi Islands he had also been the Northern Territory's Apostolic Administrator. The mission was established by Gsell on Bathurst Island at Nguiu (Wurrumiyanga) in 1911. A later timber church built in the 1930s remains a prominent landmark in Wurrumiyanga.

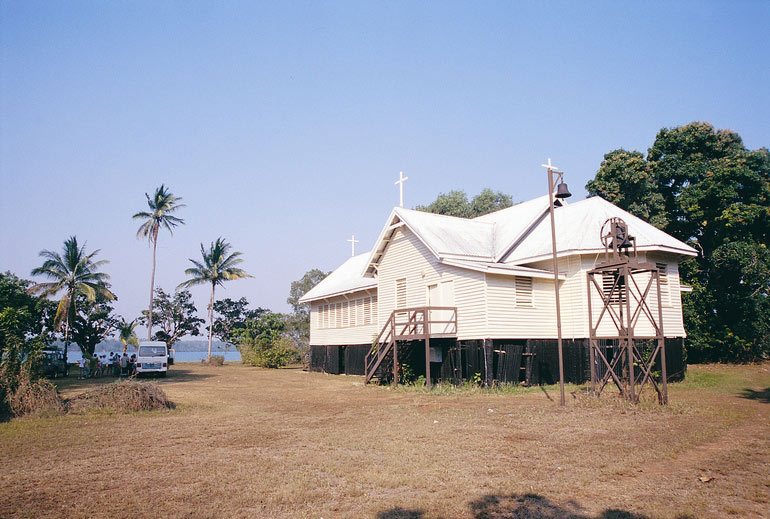
Nguiu Catholic church in 2005

The Catholic mission had positive impacts, through access to education and welfare services, but also negative effects through the suppression of Aboriginal language and culture by some in the early days. Following growing concern around the erosion of the Tiwi people's language and culture, a concerted revitalisation effort commenced in 1975, led by both clergy and lay Catholics. The Tiwi artwork in the Catholic church, and the translation of Biblical stories into Tiwi, are both notable examples of this effort. Sister Tess Ward in particular, alongside local Tiwi women, worked to encourage the continued transmission of the Tiwi people's oral history and spent years recording Tiwi culture and language in written form.

As part of the Australian government's set of policies directed at Aboriginal Australian people, Nova Peris' mother, Joan, was raised in this mission after being taken from her mother; she was one of the Stolen Generations. The mission has since taken on a more mediagenic role, serving as a key location in the 2019 Australian romantic comedy movie Top End Wedding starring Aboriginal Australian actress Miranda Tapsell.

=== Pearling industry ===
High quality pearling grounds were found offshore from the Tiwi Islands in the 1920s and 1930s, which attracted pearlers from mainland Australia and also from Japan. The Japanese pearling fleets used Bathurst Island as an anchorage for their vessels right up until at least the 1950s.

=== Advances in infrastructure ===
The Tiwi Islands' remoteness impeded much of the development on the islands during the early 20th century. Significant improvements in infrastructure did not begin until 1930 when Patrick Ritchie (the first lay missionary on Bathurst Island) arrived in Nguiu. Ritchie oversaw construction of the first road network on the islands, as well as reservoirs and stockyards. Ritchie's work was continued by Queenslander Peter de Hayr, another lay missionary who spent 24 years in the Tiwi Islands (until his death in 1958). De Hayr was credited by Bishop Francis Xavier Gsell as being instrumental in the construction of many of the Tiwi Islands' most well-known landmarks including its timber church, presbytery, convent, and school. De Hayr also built the second iteration of the St. Francis, part of the Nguiu mission's own flotilla alongside the Pius. The mission's vessels, which replaced the boat hired from Darwin firm Jolly and Co. for one pound a week, helped with Tiwi Islanders' transport needs until a large-scale commercial ferry operator could be found to service the Darwin-Tiwis route.

=== World War II ===
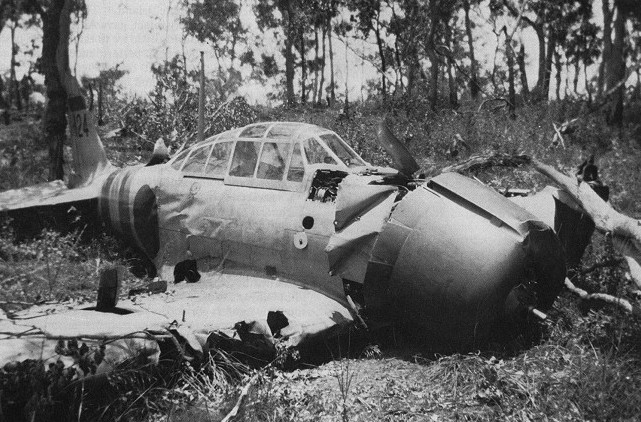
The crashed Mitsubishi A6M Zero aircraft of Hajime Toyoshima on Melville Island

During World War II, the Tiwi Islands found themselves in the centre of an increasingly aggressive confrontation between Imperial Japan and Australia which reached a crescendo on February 19, 1942. On that day, having noticed a sortie overhead, Father John McGrath sent an urgent message from the radio hut located next to Nguiu's Catholic church. The message explained that aircraft had been spotted over the islands, heading south across the Beagle Gulf towards Darwin. Officials ignored McGrath's warning and the Japanese airforce successfully managed to bomb Darwin. As the Japanese squadrons returned from the raid, a Tiwi Islander named Matthias Ulungura disarmed and captured Japanese pilot Hajime Toyoshima, who had crash landed his damaged aircraft on Melville Island, the first Japanese military personnel to be taken captive on Australian soil. Later in the war, another Tiwi man named Louie captured a further five downed Japanese pilots. He requested a single bullet from the islands' limited stockpile of ammunition to kill the pilots but Father John McGrath refused the request, instead feeding the POWs as per the rules of war prior to the five Japanese being sent to the Australian mainland.

=== Return to Indigenous control ===
Control of the islands was transferred to the Indigenous traditional owners through the Tiwi Aboriginal Land Trust, and the Tiwi Land Council that was founded in 1978. The Tiwi Islands local government area was established in 2001, when the previous community government councils in the three main communities of Wurrumiyanga (Bathurst Island), Pirlangimpi and Milikapiti (Melville Island) were amalgamated with the Wurankuwu Aboriginal Corporation to form a single local government. The Tiwi Islands Local Government was replaced in 2008 by the Tiwi Islands Shire Council as part of a Northern Territory-wide restructuring of local government.

== Politics and administration ==
=== Early efforts at administration ===
Work on establishing the first Tiwi Council began with the assistance of Father John Cosgrove in the 1950s. This coincided with a deliberate effort on his part to improve the administration of the Tiwi Islands which had hitherto been largely neglected by the federal government. Father John Cosgrove's primary reforms included improving the housing stock of the Tiwi people, as well as rectifying errors in the Government's records for the Tiwi Islands' population which inaccurately detailed many locals' names and family relationships.

=== Electorates ===
The Tiwi Islands are part of the federal electorate of Lingiari, for which the current member is Marion Scrymgour. The islands are within the Northern Territory electorate of Arafura. The current member for Arafura is Manuel Brown, from the Labor Party.

=== Local government ===
The administration of the islands is divided between the local Tiwi Islands Regional Council, and the Indigenous landholder representative organisation, the Tiwi Land Council. Representatives on the Shire Council are elected from four wards, and include 12 councillors.

1. Milikapiti Ward (northeast Melville Island, largest)
2. Nguiu Ward (south Bathurst Island, Buchanan Island)
3. Pirlangimpi Ward (west and southwest Melville Island)
4. Wurankuwu Ward (north Bathurst Island)

In 2011–12, the operating budget of the then Tiwi Islands Shire Council was A$26.4 million. As of 2019, the elected Mayor of Tiwi Islands Shire Council is Lesley Tungutalum.

=== Locality ===
On 4 April 2007, the land occupied by the Tiwi Islands and adjoining waters were gazetted by the Northern Territory Government as a locality with the name, Tiwi Islands. The boundary of the locality is similar to that gazetted in 1978 by the Australian government for the Tiwi Land Council.

== Culture ==
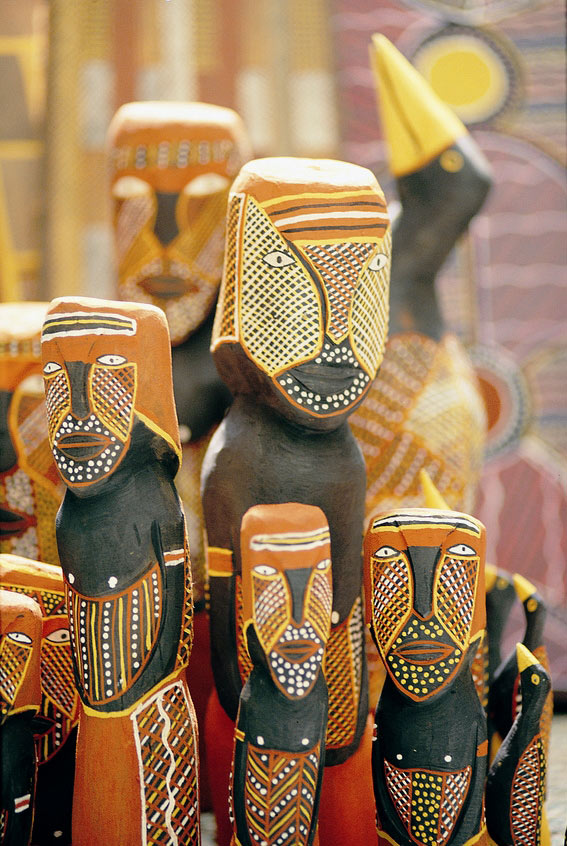
Tiwi Island decorated carvings, 2005.

=== Indigenous art ===
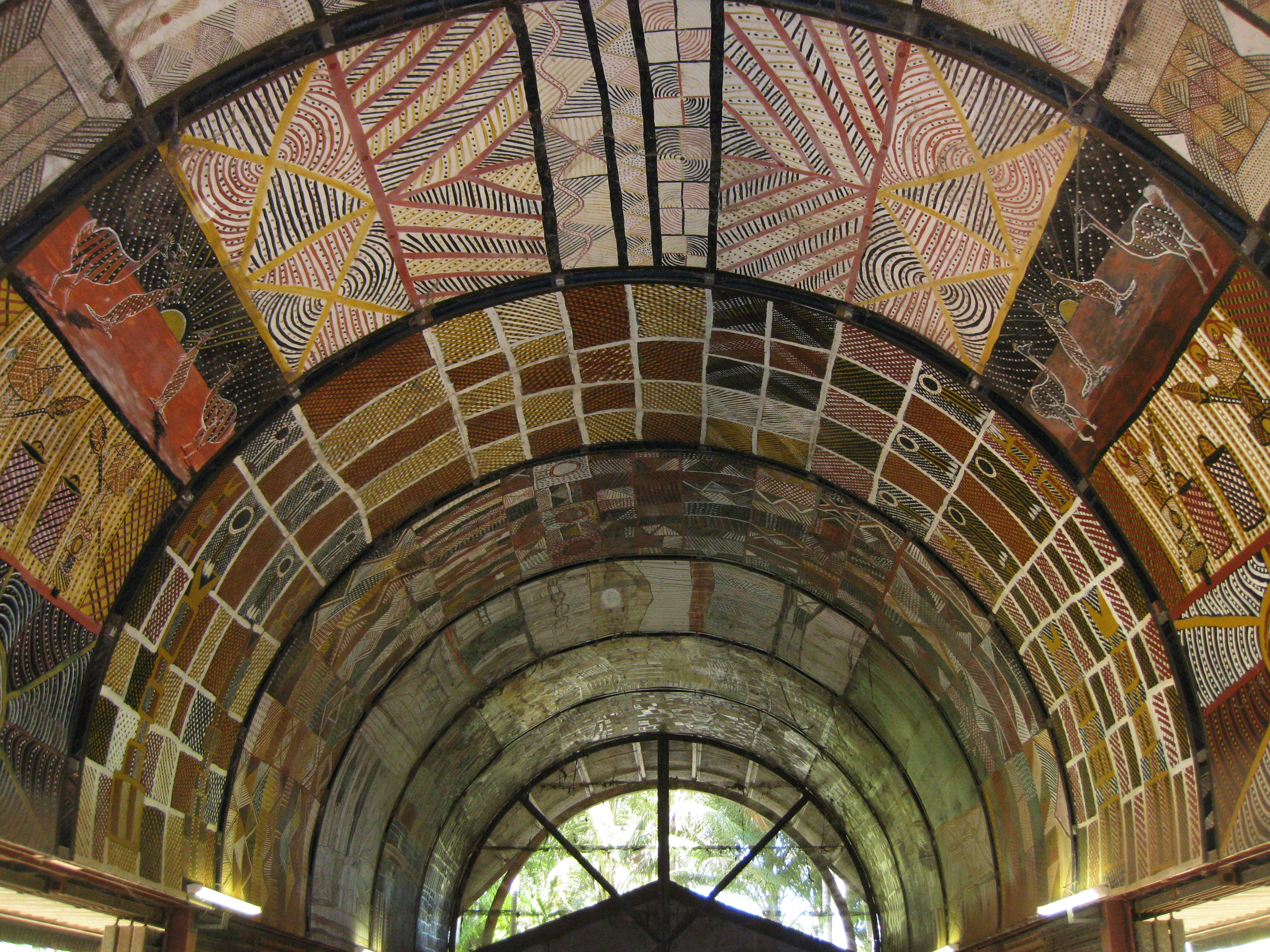
Ceiling of a Tiwi Island art gallery and studio, 2011

The creation of Indigenous Australian art is an important part of Tiwi Island culture and its economy. There are three Indigenous art centres on the islands: Tiwi Design, Munupi Arts & Crafts, and Jilamara Arts and Craft, and these collaborate through a cooperative venture, Tiwi Art. Apart from Tiwi Art network there are two independent operations: Ngaruwanajirri, also known as 'The Keeping Place', and fabric design, printing and clothing business Bima Wear, operated by Indigenous women since 1969. The apparel business was set up by Sister Eucharia Pearce, assisted by a family member, Bertha, to provide meaningful employment for the women of the Tiwi Islands. (Management of Bima Wear was done in addition to Pearce's other duties such as providing medical care, growing crops, and baking.) In 1981, Sister Eucharia Pearce received an MBE for her involvement with Bima Wear as well as her other charitable work; Pearce accepted the honour on behalf of the Tiwi people.

Tiwi artists who have held international exhibitions or whose works are held in major Australian collections include Kitty Kantilla, Donna Burak, Jean Baptiste Apuatimi, and Fiona Puruntatameri.

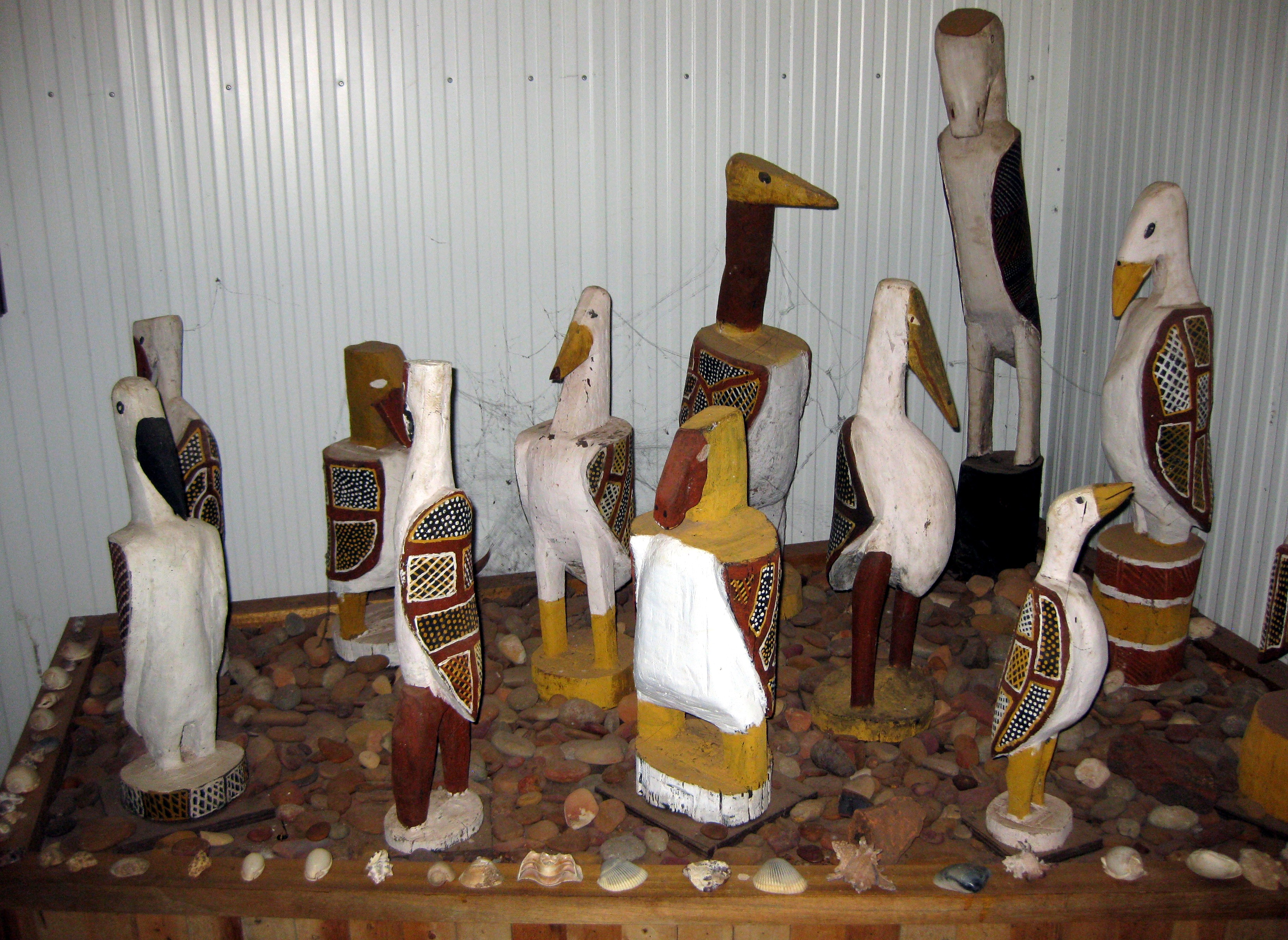
Tiwi Island bird carvings, 2011

A lot of wood carvings of birds are made by Tiwi people. Some of these are displayed in the Mission Heritage Gallery on Bathurst Island. The carvings represent various birds from Tiwi mythology, which have various meanings. Certain birds tell the Tiwi people about approaching monsoonal rains whilst others warn of impending cyclones. Others, depending on the totem of the people, alert the Tiwi people that someone has died in a particular clan. There are others that represent ancestral beings who were, according to mythology, changed into birds. Carved birds are sometimes at the top of pukumani poles, which are placed at burial sites.

The carving of human sculptures on the Tiwi islands was introduced by Cardo Kerinauia into Paru village in the 1960s after he had seen sculptures in Darwin. Paru villagers soon started a cottage industry of wood carving and had several pioneering Tiwi artists including Declan Apuatimi, Enraeld Munkara and Mick Aruni.

The Tiwi people also create many of their designs on fabric. The main method uses wax to resist dyeing similarly to Indonesian batik prints. Various fabrics are used ranging from sturdy, woven cotton to delicate silks, from which they create silk scarves.

The creation of their artwork is usually a social activity and consists of groups of people sitting together and talking whilst they work in a relaxed fashion. Often these groupings are segregated by gender.

=== Pukamani ===
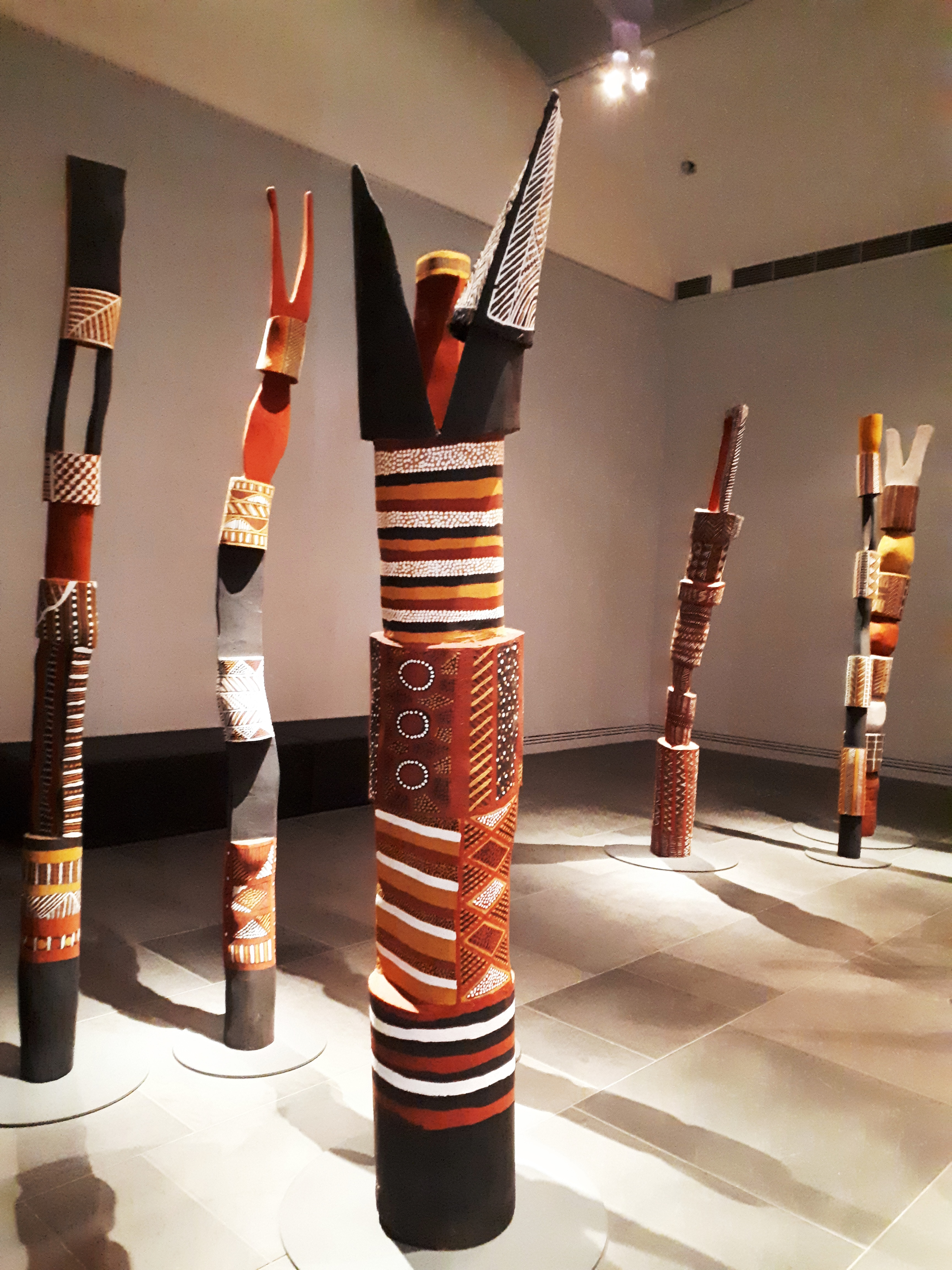
Exhibition of tutini at 2019-20 Tarnanthi exhibition in Adelaide

The pukamani, or pukumani, is a burial ceremony based on a Dreamtime story, which is performed around carved and painted grave posts, known as tutini (sometimes referred to as pukumani poles). The ceremony takes place two to six months after the burial, and may last for a few days. Specially commissioned carvers carve and paint up to 12 tutini, which are erected around the grave mound. They are made from ironwood and decorated with white clay, black charcoal, and ground yellow or red ochre.

Dancers thread their way amongst the tutini and at the end of the ceremony, Tunga, or painted bark baskets, are placed on top of the posts. The burial poles, which are intended as gifts to please the spirits of the dead, are left to decay.

There is some discussion about whether the poles are sacred ritualistic objects, or a commodified work of fine art (in one case, an exhibition displaying objects which resembled the poles created by Melbourne designers was withdrawn) but specially commissioned poles are freely borrowed or sold for displays in art galleries around Australia and the world.

=== Music ===
==== B2M ====
The band B2M ("Bathurst to Melville"), fronted by Jeffrey "Yello" Simon, was formed in the Tiwi Islands in December 2004 in Nguiu (now Wurrumiyanga) Simon, who started a career in the police force and had to attend attempted suicides, was determined to try to make a difference through music. As of 2015 other band members included Greg Orsto, James "Fab" Kantilla, Daniel Cunningham, Darren Narul and dancer Shelton Murray, all of whom sing.

They made their first recording from a live acoustic set in Darwin in 2008, which was titled B2M – Live at The Monsoon Sessions. Later in the same year, they won Emerging Artist of the Year at the NT Indigenous Music Awards (now called the National Indigenous Music Awards). In 2011 the band released their first official track, "Japparik'a", which is the Tiwi Bombers Football Club's anthem. Their debut album (2213) Home was released in 2015 on Skinnyfish Music, containing work shaped over 10 years. It included their first single, "Parlingarri", which contains an old Tiwi chant never before heard outside the Tiwi Islands; special permission had to obtained from Tiwi elders to use it.

They have a large Indigenous following in Australia, where they often sing songs with positive messages about alcohol and drugs. They have toured East Timor, Bali and Shanghai. The band toured Taiwan, headlining the Pulima Indigenous arts festival in 2016, and played the Northern Territory's Barunga Festival in 2018. They sang more traditional songs in Taiwan, and were inspired by their experience there to instigate "Project Songlines", in which they mix very old traditional Tiwi chants with chants from other indigenous cultures. Also in 2018, they did a nationwide tour named Mamanta, performing at the Riverside Theatres in Parramatta in September. They had been working with Australian-Irish musician Steve Cooney, including experimenting with mixing up traditional Irish Gaelic music with Tiwi sounds. Their main motivation for touring is to share their culture. The 2018 tour included 23 shows and 15 workshops.

Singer Greg Orsto died on 5 January 2021 of a heart attack, aged 59. He was described as ""the heart of B2M, a quiet but powerful influence on the band".

== Sport ==
=== Australian rules football ===
Australian rules football is the most popular sport on the Tiwi Islands, and was introduced in 1941 by missionaries John Pye and Andy Howley. There has been a Tiwi Islands Football League competition since 1969.

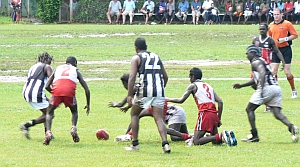
A Tiwi Islands Aussie Rules game.

The Tiwi Australian Football League has 900 participants out of a community of about 2600, the highest football participation rate in Australia (35%). The Tiwi Islands Football League Grand Final is held in March each year and attracts up to 3,000 spectators.

Tiwi footballers are renowned for exquisite "one-touch" skills. Many of the players have a preference for playing barefoot. Many of the male players also play for the St Mary's Football Club in Darwin, which was formed specifically to allow Tiwi soldiers in the 1950s to play in the Northern Territory Football League.

The Tiwi Bombers Football Club fielded a team in the Northern Territory Football League from the 2006/07 season.

Notable footballers from the Tiwi Islands to have played in the national VFL / AFL competition. Particularly notable is the Rioli dynasty of AFL players related to Cyril Rioli Snr. Members of the family include Maurice Rioli, Cyril Rioli, Daniel Rioli, Dean Rioli, Willie Rioli, Daniel Rioli and Maurice Rioli Jr. Other notable players include Ronnie Burns, Michael Long, Austin Wonaeamirri, David Kantilla Anthony McDonald-Tipungwuti, Ben Long and Sean Lemmens.

Maurice Rioli (1982) and Michael Long (1993) are both uncles of Cyril Rioli (2015), and all three have won the Norm Smith Medal for being adjudged the best player of an AFL Grand Final.

The Tiwi Islands Football Club was the subject of a series on ABC's Message Stick in 2009, called "In A League of Their Own".

=== Cricket ===
As reported in The Weekend Australian in 2010, Australian cricketers led by Mathew Hayden raised $200,000 for cricket development in the Tiwi Islands. With former internationals Allan Border, Michael Kasprowicz and Andy Bichel, the match between Hayden XI and Border XI had a turnout of 1,000 people, nearly half the islands' population.

== Transport ==
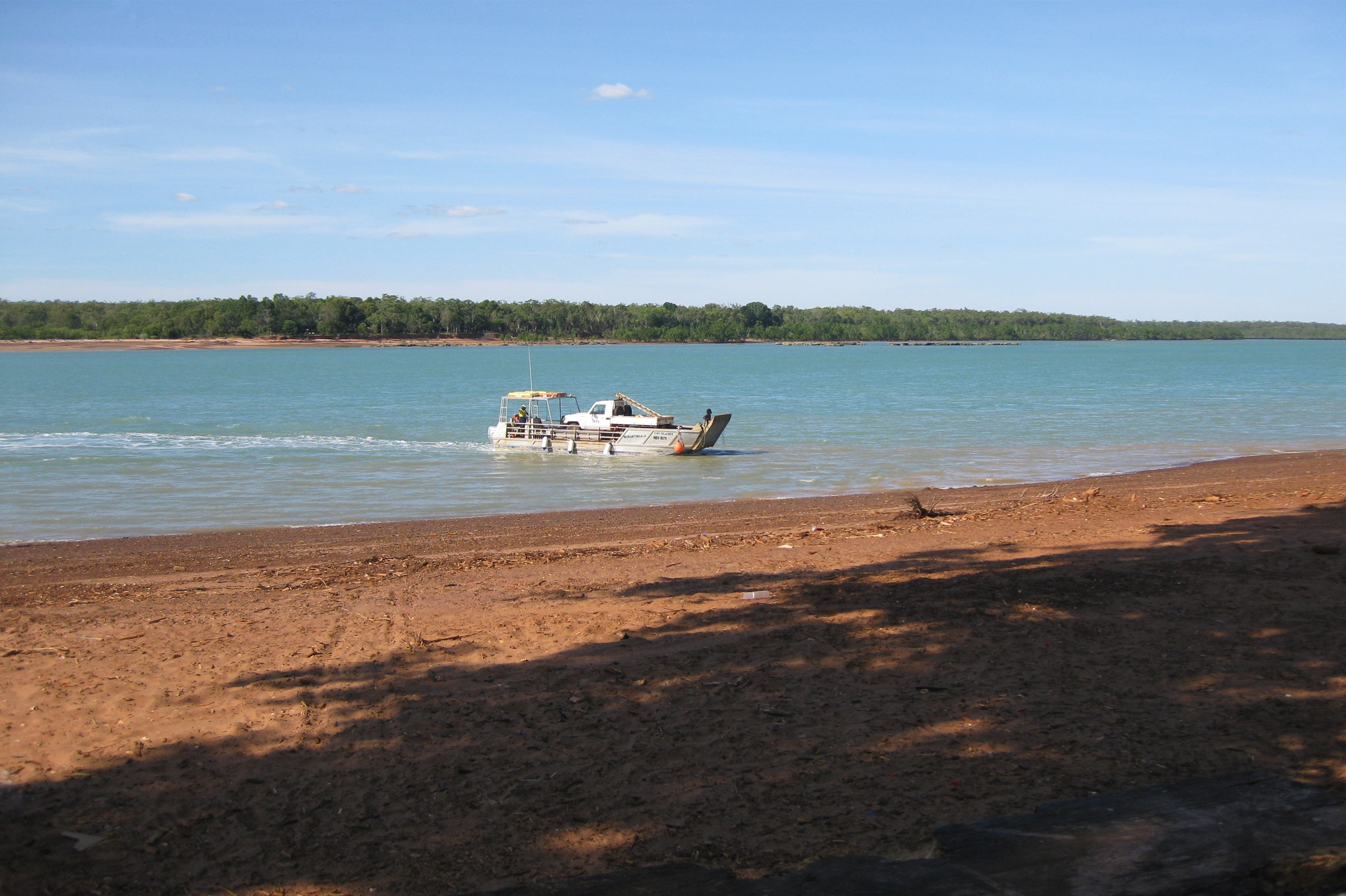
Tiwi Islands Car Ferry in May 2011

A commercial flight operator, Fly Tiwi, connects both islands to each other and to Darwin. Formed as an association between Hardy Aviation and the Tiwi Land Council, Fly Tiwi has daily flights to all three communities on the islands.

SeaLink NT operates ferry services connecting Wurrumiyanga and Darwin, making the 2.5-hour trip each way three days a week.

In 2008, local government maintained 925 km (575 mi) of roads on the islands.

It is an offence to take alcohol to the Tiwi Islands and companies which maintain transport links are known to screen passengers' luggage for it. While the Tiwi Islands are not strictly dry due to the availability of alcohol at certain licensed venues there, such as holiday resorts, the public consumption and importation of alcohol is strictly monitored and any alcohol found can be confiscated.

== Environment, conservation and land use ==
The islands' climatic and geographical extremity means that they have distinctive vegetation and special conservation values:

because of their isolation and because they have extremely high rainfall, the Tiwi Islands support many species not recorded elsewhere in the Northern Territory (or in the world), and some range-restricted species. The Tiwi Islands contain the Territory's best-developed (tallest and with greatest basal area) eucalypt forests and an unusually high density and extent of rainforests.

=== Climate ===
The Tiwi Islands have a tropical monsoon climate, (Köppen Am), with 2,000 mm (79 in) of rainfall on northern Bathurst Island and 1,200 to 1,400 mm (47 to 55 in) on eastern Melville Island. The wet season from November to April brings the islands the highest rainfall in the Northern Territory. The Tiwi people describe three distinct seasons: the dry (season of smoke), the buildup (high humidity and cicadas songs) and the wet (storms) The seasons frame the lifestyle of the Tiwi people, dictating the food sources available and their ceremonial activities.

Tiwi is subject to a recurring meteorological phenomenon, dubbed Hector, wherein a thunderstorm forms nearly every day from November to December and February through March. The storm is very powerful, going over 20 kilometres into the atmosphere, and is visible from as far away as Darwin. It is caused by the collision of sea breezes across the islands.

Climate data for Milikapiti (Melville Island)
Month	Jan	Feb	Mar	Apr	May	Jun	Jul	Aug	Sep	Oct	Nov	Dec	Year
Record high °C (°F)	37.2 (99.0)	36.2 (97.2)	36.6 (97.9)	37.3 (99.1)	36.7 (98.1)	36.0 (96.8)	36.0 (96.8)	36.1 (97.0)	36.3 (97.3)	37.2 (99.0)	37.2 (99.0)	36.8 (98.2)	37.3 (99.1)
Mean daily maximum °C (°F)	32.0 (89.6)	32.0 (89.6)	32.3 (90.1)	33.5 (92.3)	32.9 (91.2)	31.5 (88.7)	31.1 (88.0)	32.0 (89.6)	33.0 (91.4)	33.7 (92.7)	33.8 (92.8)	32.9 (91.2)	32.6 (90.7)
Mean daily minimum °C (°F)	23.8 (74.8)	23.7 (74.7)	23.7 (74.7)	22.8 (73.0)	21.2 (70.2)	19.1 (66.4)	18.4 (65.1)	20.0 (68.0)	21.7 (71.1)	23.3 (73.9)	24.0 (75.2)	23.9 (75.0)	22.1 (71.8)
Record low °C (°F)	19.4 (66.9)	19.4 (66.9)	20.6 (69.1)	17.8 (64.0)	15.0 (59.0)	13.3 (55.9)	10.6 (51.1)	14.7 (58.5)	17.2 (63.0)	17.8 (64.0)	21.1 (70.0)	21.3 (70.3)	10.6 (51.1)
Average rainfall mm (inches)	298.5 (11.75)	295.2 (11.62)	317.8 (12.51)	102.3 (4.03)	67.4 (2.65)	5.9 (0.23)	0.9 (0.04)	4.5 (0.18)	5.9 (0.23)	51.2 (2.02)	121.9 (4.80)	282.8 (11.13)	1,554.3 (61.19)
Average rainy days (≥ 0.2mm)	17.8	16.2	17.1	8.1	3.6	0.9	0.4	0.6	0.9	4.1	10.3	14.6	94.6
Source: Bureau of Meteorology

Climate data for Cape Fourcroy (Bathurst Island)
Month	Jan	Feb	Mar	Apr	May	Jun	Jul	Aug	Sep	Oct	Nov	Dec	Year
Record high °C (°F)	34.3 (93.7)	34.7 (94.5)	33.7 (92.7)	35.0 (95.0)	34.0 (93.2)	33.0 (91.4)	33.2 (91.8)	34.0 (93.2)	35.2 (95.4)	36.3 (97.3)	35.9 (96.6)	35.3 (95.5)	36.3 (97.3)
Mean daily maximum °C (°F)	31.6 (88.9)	31.5 (88.7)	31.6 (88.9)	32.1 (89.8)	31.2 (88.2)	29.4 (84.9)	29.8 (85.6)	30.7 (87.3)	31.9 (89.4)	32.8 (91.0)	33.0 (91.4)	32.4 (90.3)	31.5 (88.7)
Mean daily minimum °C (°F)	25.8 (78.4)	25.6 (78.1)	24.9 (76.8)	23.6 (74.5)	21.2 (70.2)	18.7 (65.7)	18.5 (65.3)	18.8 (65.8)	21.4 (70.5)	23.8 (74.8)	25.0 (77.0)	25.5 (77.9)	22.7 (72.9)
Record low °C (°F)	21.8 (71.2)	21.9 (71.4)	20.0 (68.0)	16.5 (61.7)	12.0 (53.6)	8.2 (46.8)	9.9 (49.8)	11.9 (53.4)	12.6 (54.7)	18.8 (65.8)	21.4 (70.5)	22.0 (71.6)	8.2 (46.8)
Average rainfall mm (inches)	343.4 (13.52)	280.4 (11.04)	220.5 (8.68)	144.0 (5.67)	31.1 (1.22)	7.2 (0.28)	0.3 (0.01)	0.5 (0.02)	11.0 (0.43)	67.4 (2.65)	119.6 (4.71)	308.5 (12.15)	1,533.9 (60.38)
Average rainy days (≥ 0.2mm)	19.2	15.6	15.8	11.1	4.2	1.6	0.4	0.8	1.9	6.4	10.3	16.3	103.6
Source: Bureau of Meteorology

Climate data for Pirlangimpi Airport
Month	Jan	Feb	Mar	Apr	May	Jun	Jul	Aug	Sep	Oct	Nov	Dec	Year
Record high °C (°F)	36.4 (97.5)	36.5 (97.7)	36.7 (98.1)	37.1 (98.8)	35.8 (96.4)	35.0 (95.0)	35.1 (95.2)	36.1 (97.0)	38.3 (100.9)	38.1 (100.6)	38.6 (101.5)	37.2 (99.0)	38.6 (101.5)
Mean daily maximum °C (°F)	32.1 (89.8)	32.0 (89.6)	32.4 (90.3)	33.0 (91.4)	32.8 (91.0)	31.6 (88.9)	31.6 (88.9)	32.5 (90.5)	33.7 (92.7)	34.1 (93.4)	34.0 (93.2)	33.2 (91.8)	32.8 (91.0)
Daily mean °C (°F)	28.4 (83.1)	28.3 (82.9)	28.2 (82.8)	28.1 (82.6)	27.1 (80.8)	25.3 (77.5)	25.0 (77.0)	25.8 (78.4)	27.5 (81.5)	28.6 (83.5)	29.1 (84.4)	29.0 (84.2)	27.5 (81.6)
Mean daily minimum °C (°F)	24.8 (76.6)	24.6 (76.3)	24.1 (75.4)	23.2 (73.8)	21.5 (70.7)	19.0 (66.2)	18.5 (65.3)	19.1 (66.4)	21.4 (70.5)	23.1 (73.6)	24.2 (75.6)	24.9 (76.8)	22.4 (72.3)
Record low °C (°F)	15.4 (59.7)	20.0 (68.0)	18.0 (64.4)	15.7 (60.3)	14.0 (57.2)	10.5 (50.9)	11.6 (52.9)	12.8 (55.0)	15.9 (60.6)	18.9 (66.0)	17.6 (63.7)	21.0 (69.8)	10.5 (50.9)
Average rainfall mm (inches)	414.2 (16.31)	374.8 (14.76)	331.9 (13.07)	192.0 (7.56)	22.7 (0.89)	0.9 (0.04)	1.8 (0.07)	3.2 (0.13)	22.2 (0.87)	79.0 (3.11)	182.2 (7.17)	361.2 (14.22)	1,986.1 (78.2)
Average rainy days	20.9	20.0	21.3	13.4	3.9	0.6	0.8	1.0	3.1	8.1	14.8	19.0	126.9

=== Flora and fauna ===
The islands have been isolated from the Australian mainland since the last Ice Age. They are covered mainly with eucalypt forest on a gently sloping lateritic plateau. The extensive open forest, open woodlands and riparian vegetation are dominated by Darwin stringybarks, woollybutts, and cajuputs. There are small patches of rainforest occurring in association with perennial freshwater springs, and mangroves occupying the numerous inlets.

There is a range of threatened and endemic species on the Tiwi Islands. Thirty-eight threatened species have been recorded, and a number of plants and invertebrates are found nowhere else, including eight plant species and some land snails and dragonflies. The islands are exceptionally mammal diverse, hosting 36 species of native mammals. Threatened mammals include brush-tailed rabbit rats, northern brush-tailed phascogales, false water rats and Carpentarian dunnarts. The islands host the world's largest breeding colony of crested terns and a large population of the vulnerable olive ridley turtle; a sea turtle conservation program commenced on the islands in 2007. The seas and estuaries around the islands are home to several species of shark and saltwater crocodiles.

Invasive mammals on the islands include black rats, cats, pigs, water buffalo, horses, and cattle. Water buffalo are common on Melville Island but not Bathurst Island, while feral pigs are common on Bathurst Island but not Melville Island. The Tiwi Land Council is currently working to eradicate feral pigs from Melville Island before they can establish a large population. The Tiwi Land Council and the Tiwi Aboriginal community more broadly are both in favor of feral cat eradication, although no plans for it are currently underway.

==== Important Bird Area ====
The islands have been identified as an Important Bird Area (IBA) by BirdLife International because they support relatively high densities of red goshawks, partridge pigeons and bush stone-curlews, as well as up to 12,000 (over 1% of the world population) great knots. Other birds for which the Tiwi Island populations are globally significant include chestnut rails, beach stone-curlews, northern rosellas, varied lorikeets, rainbow pittas, silver-crowned friarbirds, white-gaped, yellow-tinted and bar-breasted honeyeaters, canary white-eyes and masked finches. The birds have a high level of endemism at the subspecific level; the Tiwi masked owl (Tyto novaehollandiae melvillensis) is considered endangered and the Tiwi hooded robin (Melanodryas cucullata melvillensis) is at least endangered and may be extinct.

=== Forestry and mining ===
Forest products are an important part of the Tiwi Islands economy, but the sector has had a chequered history. Forestry dates back to 1898, with plantations being trialled from the 1950s and 1960s. A native softwood enterprise was established in the mid-1980s, as a partnership between the private sector and the Land Council, but by the mid-1990s, the Land Council was winding the venture down, noting that its investor partner had "various tax driven ambitions which are growingly incompatible with our own employment and sustainable production goals". Despite the setback, it was still considered that forestry was likely to be crucial to the Tiwi economy, and in 2001 the Land Council and Australian Plantations Group commenced a major expansion of Acacia mangium plantations to supply woodchips. The operations of Australian Plantations Group (later named Sylvatech) were purchased by Great Southern Group in 2005. In 2006, the operations were reported to be "the largest native-forest clearing project in northern Australia". In September 2007 the Northern Territory Government investigated claims that the company had breached environmental laws, with financial penalties being imposed by the Federal environment department in 2008. Much of the cleared land is used for cattle or monoculture plantations, which the timber company has maintained are an important source of local jobs. Great Southern Plantations collapsed in early 2009, and the Tiwi Land Council has been examining options for future management of the plantations.

The islands have mineral sands on both Melville Island's north coast and the western coast of Bathurst Island. In 2005, Matilda Minerals developed a proposal for mining on the islands, which was assessed and approved in 2006. In 2007 sand mining produced the first shipments of zircon and rutile for export to China. A 7,800 tonnes (17 million pounds) shipment was made in June 2007, with a further 5,000 tonnes (11 million pounds) shipped later that year. Matilda Minerals planned to conduct mining for four years, but in August 2008, its Tiwi operations were halted, and in October of that year it was placed in administration.

In March 2020, Plantation Management Partners (PMP), which manages around 30,000 hectares of acacia mangium trees on the Tiwis, made the decision to delay the year's harvest while demand for woodchips in China was depressed due to the COVID-19 pandemic.

== See also ==
- Hector (storm)
