= Melville Island (Northern Territory) =

Island in Northern Territory

Melville
Native name: (Tiwi) Yermalner
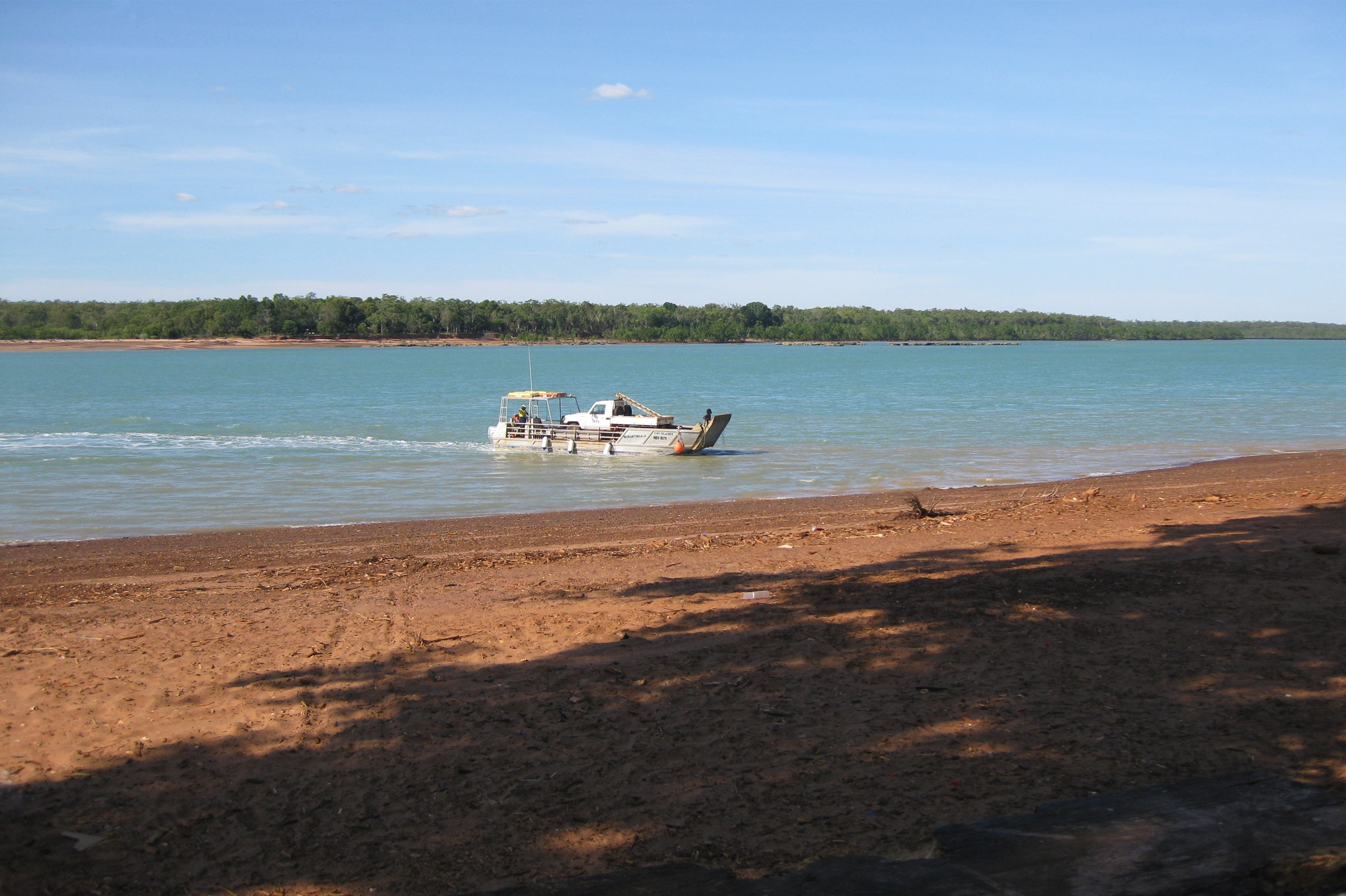
- Melville Island, viewed from Bathurst Island

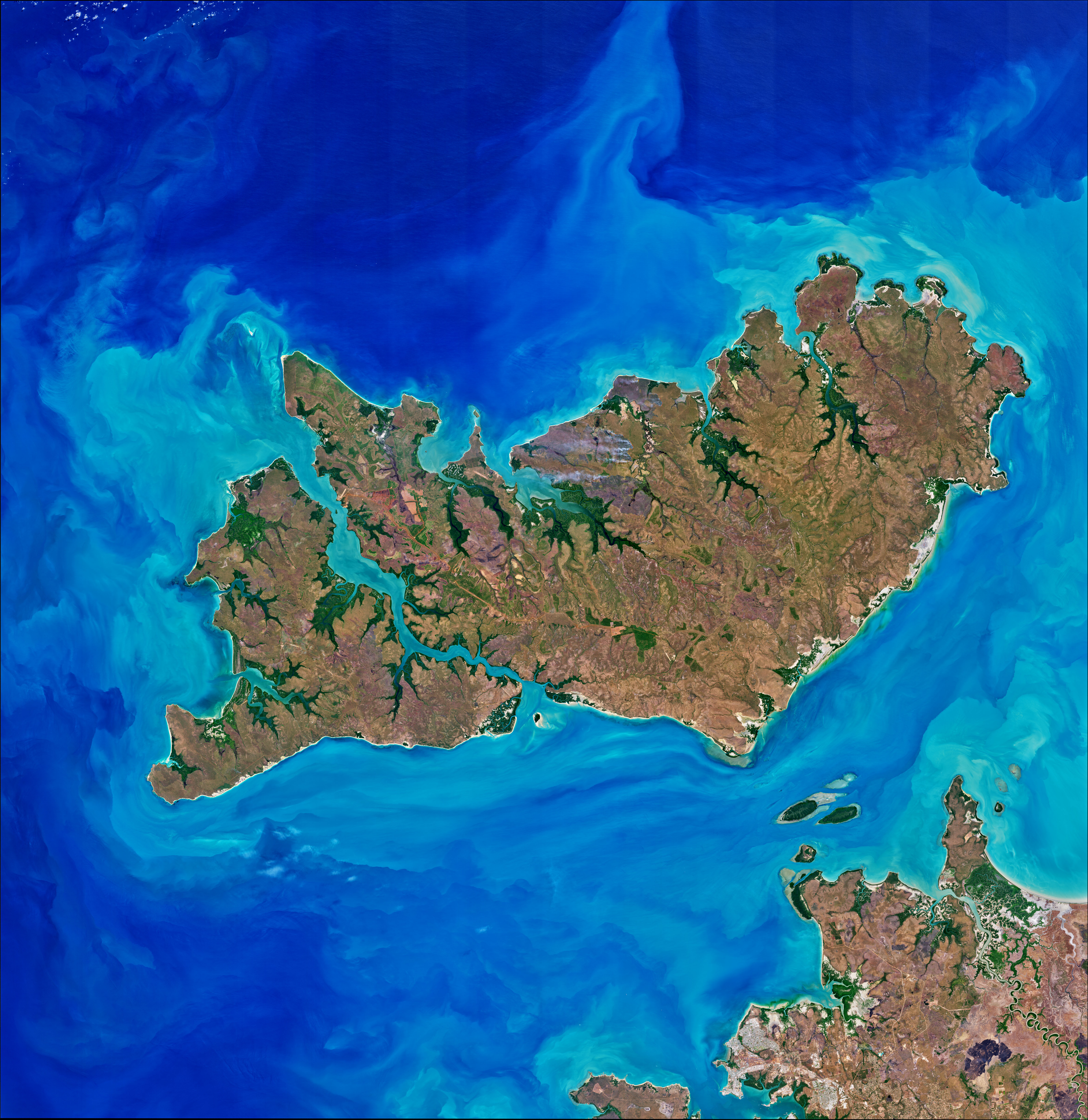
- Satellite image of Melville Island (top right) with Bathurst Island (left) and the Australian mainland (bottom right)

- Location within Northern Territory Location within Australia

Geography
- Location: Timor Sea
- Coordinates: 11°33′S 130°56′E
- Archipelago: Tiwi Islands
- Major islands: Melville, Irrititu
- Area: 5,786 km^{2} (2,234 sq mi)

Administration
- Australia
- Territory: Northern Territory
- Largest settlement: Milikapiti (pop. 559)

Demographics
- Population: c. 1030
- Ethnic groups: Tiwi

Melville Island (Tiwi: Yermalner) is an island in the eastern Timor Sea, off the coast of the Northern Territory, Australia. Along with Bathurst Island and nine smaller uninhabited islands, it forms part of the group known as the Tiwi Islands, which are under the jurisdiction of the Northern Territory in association with the Tiwi Land Council as the regional authority. It is roughly the same size as Prince Edward Island in Canada.

== History ==
Indigenous people have occupied the area that became the Tiwi Islands for at least 40,000 years. It is said that the first European to sight the island was Abel Tasman in 1644.

Explorer Phillip Parker King (son of governor of New South Wales Philip Gidley King) named it for Robert Dundas, 2nd Viscount Melville, first Lord of the Admiralty, who is also commemorated by the much larger Melville Island in the Canadian Arctic Archipelago. Shortly after this, the British made the first attempt to settle Australia's north coast, at the short-lived Fort Dundas on Melville Island. The settlement lasted from 1824 to 1828.

In an 1853 book chapter on Melville Island, George Windsor Earl theorised that the island had been a source of slaves for Portuguese Timor and had been regularly raided by Portuguese slave traders, citing anecdotal evidence from King and Fort Dundas commandant John Campbell. Earl's theory has been repeated and expanded by a number of subsequent writers, sometimes in support of the unorthodox theory of the Portuguese discovery of Australia. However, no direct evidence for these practices exists in Portuguese sources or in Tiwi oral tradition.

There was a Catholic mission on the island, on which Nova Peris' mother was raised after being taken from her mother.

During World War II the small Snake Bay Patrol manned by local Tiwi people was established as part of the military forces deployed to protect the island against any Japanese landings.

== Geography and climate ==
The island lies in the eastern Timor Sea, approximately 60 kilometres (37 mi) north of Darwin and west of the Cobourg Peninsula in Arnhem Land, in the Northern Territory. At 5,786 square kilometres (2,234 sq mi), it is just outside the 100 largest islands in the world, but is the second biggest island of Australia, after Tasmania. Irrititu Island, 1.60 square kilometres (0.62 sq mi), lies 55 metres (180 ft) south of Melville Island's southern tip. The islands have a tropical climate, specifically a tropical savanna climate (Aw.)

== Population ==
The largest settlement on the island is Milikapiti, with a population of 559. The second largest is Pirlangimpi (Pularumpi, formerly Garden Point), with a population of 440, located 27 km (17 mi) west of Milikapiti, on the west coast of Melville Island. About 30 more people live in five family outstations.

== Governance ==
As part of the Tiwi Islands, Melville is under the jurisdiction of the Northern Territory, with the Tiwi Land Council as the regional authority.
