= Maurice Rioli Jr. =

Australian rules footballer (born 2002)

Maurice Rioli
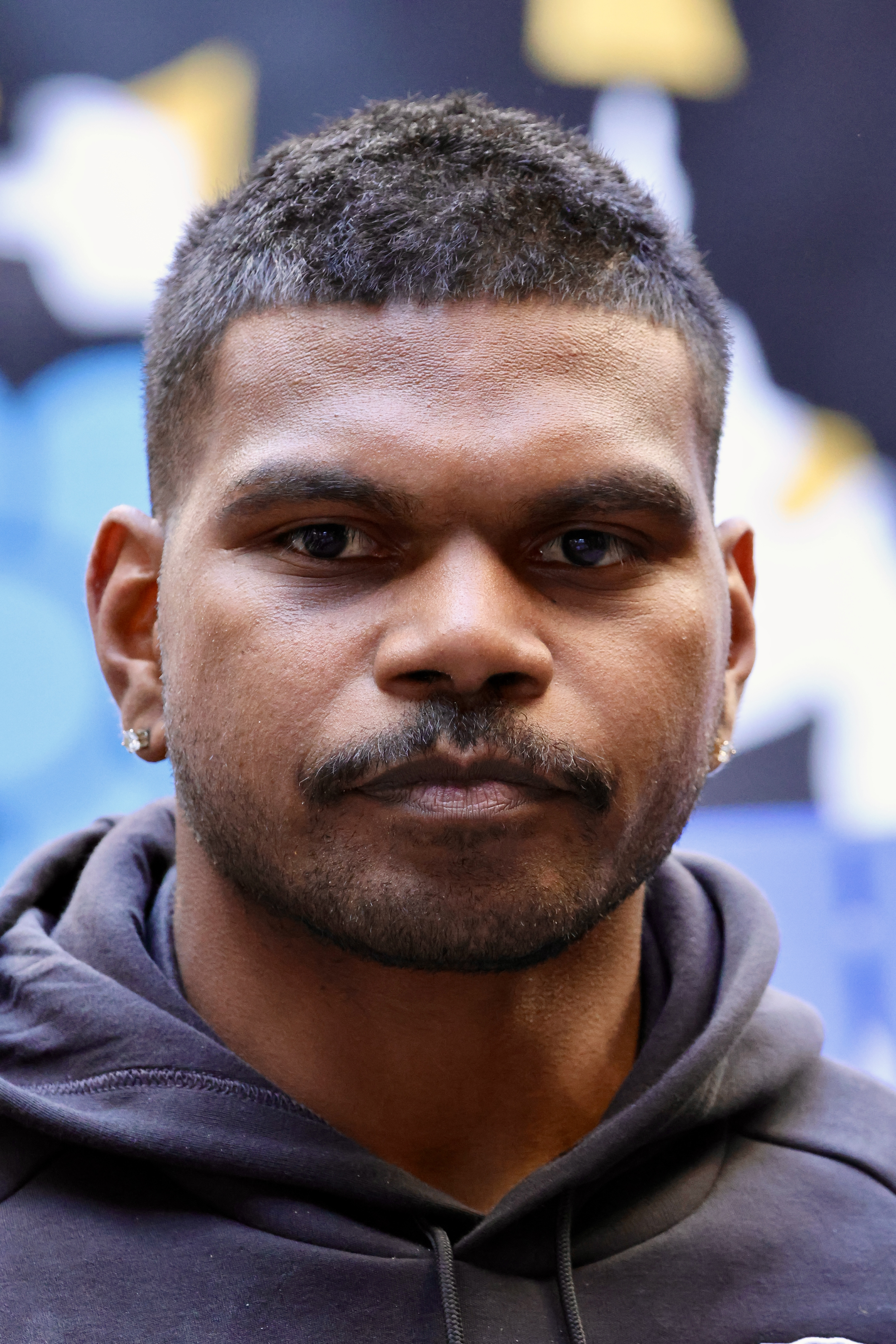
- Rioli at the 2026 Gather Round

Personal information
- Nickname: MJ
- Born: 1 September 2002 (age 24); Darwin, Northern Territory
- Original team: St Mary's (NTFL)/Scotch College/Oakleigh Chargers
- Draft: No. 51, (F/S), 2020 national draft
- Debut: Round 21, 2021, Richmond vs. North Melbourne, at MCG
- Height: 179 cm (5 ft 10 in)
- Weight: 75 kg (165 lb)
- Position: Forward

Club information
- Current club: Richmond
- Number: 17

Playing career^{1}
Years	Club	Games (Goals)
2021–	Richmond	59 (32)

Representative team honours
Years	Team	Games (Goals)
2025	Indigenous All-Stars	1 (0)
- ^{1} Playing statistics correct to the end of 2026.

Maurice Rioli, Jr. (born 1 September 2002) is a professional Australian rules footballer who plays for the Richmond Football Club in the Australian Football League (AFL)

== Early life, junior football and state-league football ==
Rioli is the namesake and son of former Richmond and South Fremantle player and Australian Football Hall of Fame member Maurice Rioli. He grew up in Pirlangimpi on Melville Island, among the Tiwi Islands of the Northern Territory alongside relatives including his (older) nephew and eventual Richmond player Daniel Rioli.

He first attended high school at St John's Catholic College in Darwin. He was the subject to significant media attention from the age of 14, owing to his famous heritage and his special draft status with each of Richmond, Fremantle and Essendon vying for his commitment, with the first two afforded priority access under the father–son rule and the third under the AFL's Next Generation Academy rules. Rioli showed the strongest links to Richmond during his early teenage years, regularly visiting the club where his nephew Daniel Rioli was drafted in 2015.

He represented the Northern Territory as a 14-year-old at the 2017 AFL Under-16s Championships where he was a regular goalkicker. Later that year he made his senior football debut, playing for St Mary's in the Northern Territory Football League.

Rioli relocated to Melbourne in early 2018 where he boarded at Scotch College. He played football for the school that year, as well as once again representing the Territory at the Under 16s Championships.

After another summer season with St Mary's, Rioli returned to Melbourne in 2019 where he joined the squad of the Oakleigh Chargers, though would not earn a top-flight NAB League match during that his 'underage' year. Instead, he played NAB League football as part of a representative Northern Territory representative side.

For a third straight season, Rioli played for St Mary's in the 2019/20 summer and into early autumn, ahead of his final year of underage football. He played nine games in the season, with his most impressive performance coming with a best-on-ground four goals in a semi-final win, before adding one goal in St Mary's losing grand final showing the following week. That same summer he trained with the AFL squad at Richmond as part of the club's father–son program for which he would be eligible at the coming draft. Rioli intended to play school football with Scotch and with Oakleigh in the NAB League that year, but ultimately each league's season was cancelled along with the AFL Under 18 Championships as a result of public health restrictions imposed in response to the COVID-19 pandemic.

=== AFL recruitment ===
In September 2020, Rioli was one of 96 players invited to the AFL Draft Combine. Around this time he confirmed years of informal commitment, nominating for selection to Richmond under the father–son rule.

Prior to the draft, Rioli was forecast to land with Richmond at pick 47 and 52 by Fox Footy and ESPN in their respective phantom drafts. He was noted for his tackling ability, goal-sense and sprint speed.

== AFL career ==
=== 2021 season ===
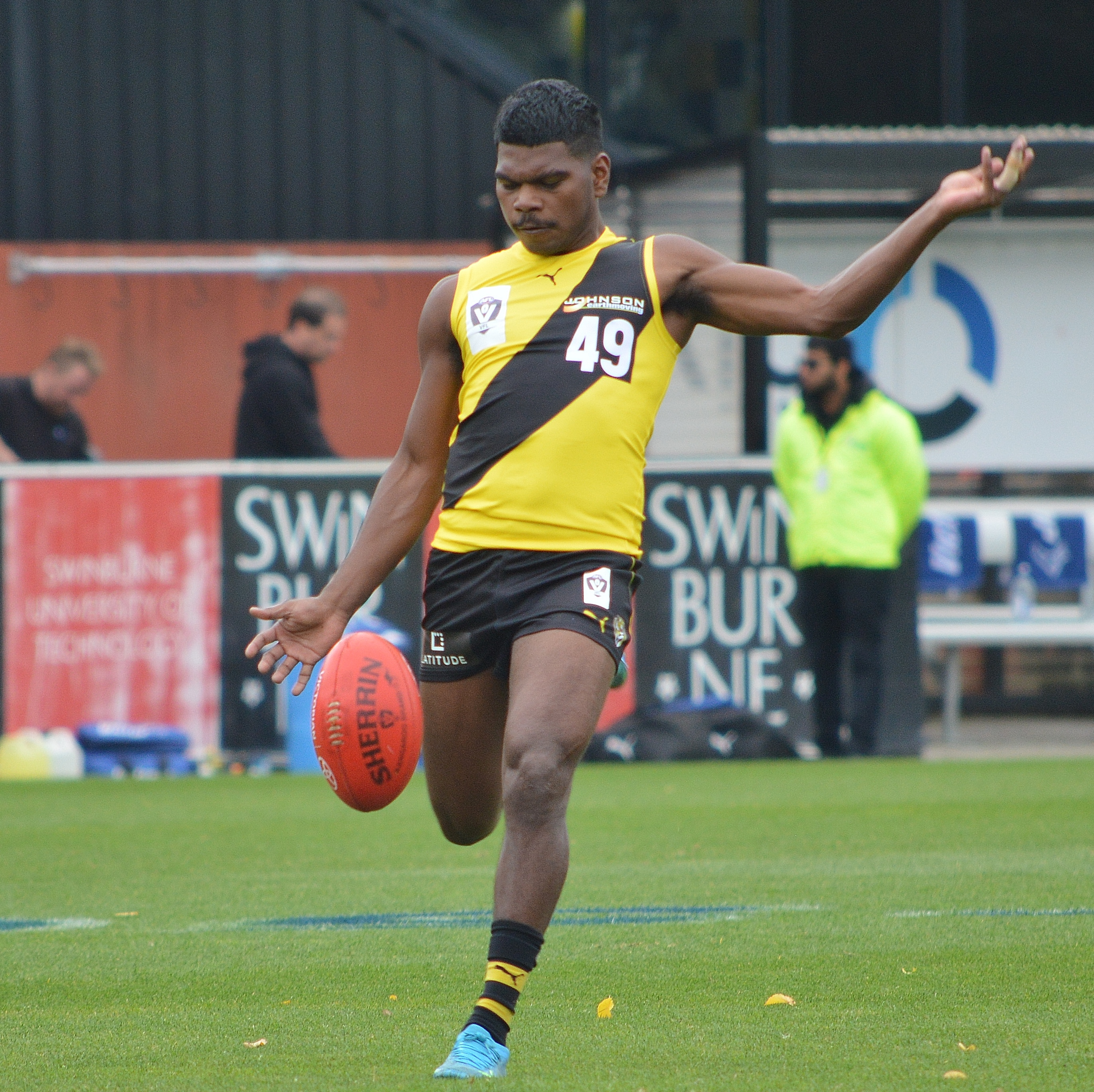
Rioli kicking in the VFL for Richmond

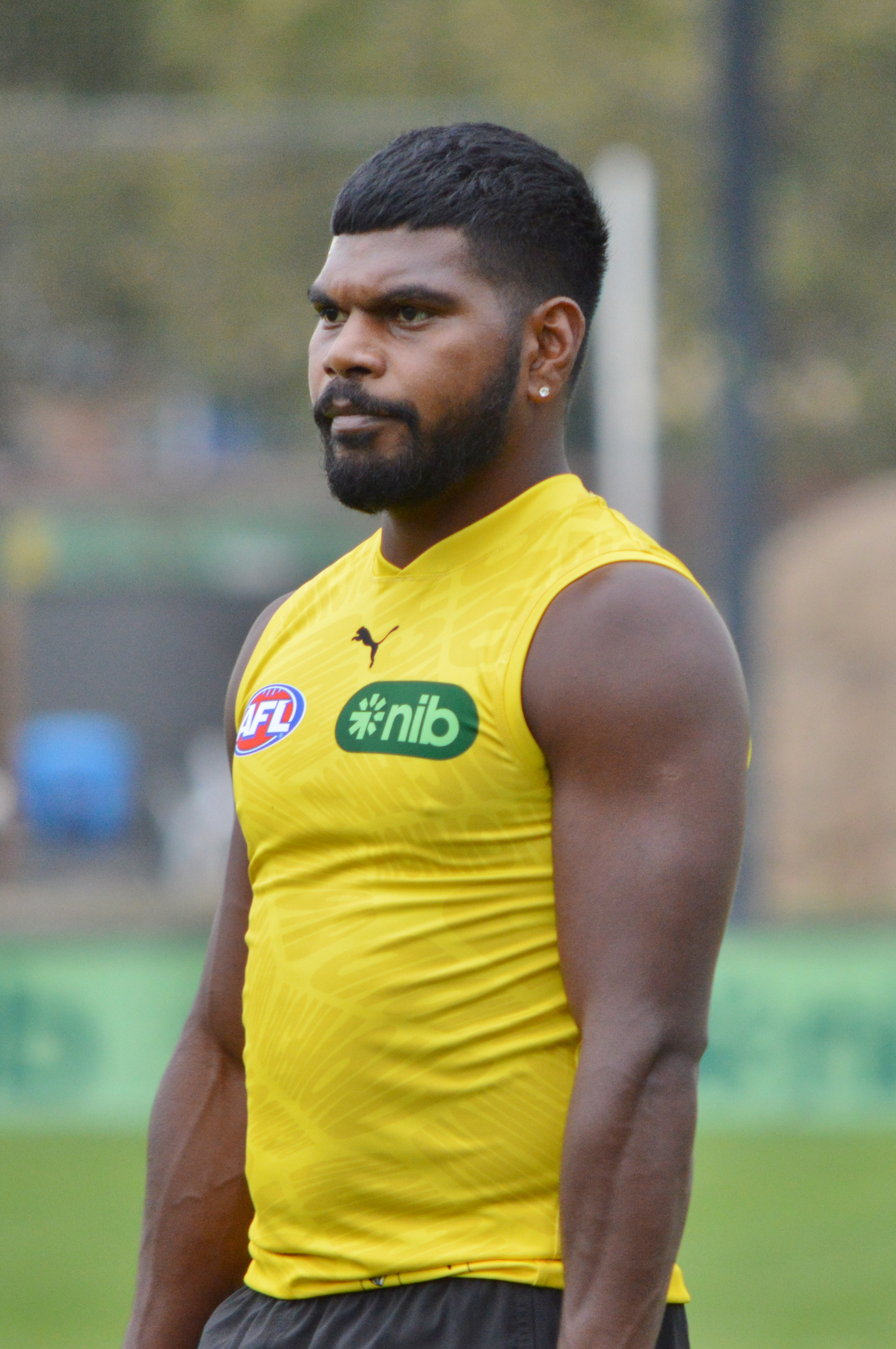
Rioli training with the Tigers in 2026

Rioli was drafted by Richmond with the club's second pick and the 51st selection overall in the 2020 AFL national draft, after using its father–son rule rule rights to match a bid from Essendon.

He first represented Richmond as part of the club's reserves side, featuring in VFL pre-season matches from February through April when the season officially began. Rioli impressed over that time, first earning a place as a non-playing emergency in the club's round 5 AFL match against St Kilda. Though he went unselected in the final team, he was a stand-out performer at reserves level, kicking two goals and recording 17 disposals in the opening round of the VFL season that same weekend. He was an AFL emergency regularly over the month that followed, while continuing to play VFL football as a small forward with occasional stints in the midfield. In May, Richmond senior coach Damien Hardwick labelled Rioli close to AFL selection, but said he would require a stronger endurance base before he could be named for a debut. Through the first week of July, he ranked second among midfield-forwards in the VFL with 5.8 tackles per game and was in contention for the league's goal of the year award with a 90-metre sprint goal against the Northern Bullants. Following an eight-tackle game against Frankston in early August, Rioli was elevated to senior level and named to make his AFL debut in a round 21 match against North Melbourne.

== Player profile ==
Rioli plays primarily as a defensive small forward and is notable for his ability to apply forward-half pressure and create turnovers among opposition defenders.

== Statistics ==
Updated to the end of the 2025 season.

Legend
G	Goals	K	Kicks	D	Disposals	T	Tackles
B	Behinds	H	Handballs	M	Marks

Season	Team	No.	Games	Totals							Averages (per game)						
Season	Team	No.	Games	G	B	K	H	D	M	T	G	B	K	H	D	M	T
2021	Richmond	49	2	2	0	7	2	9	1	4	1.0	0.0	3.5	1.0	4.5	0.5	2.0
2022	Richmond	49	15	14	7	76	46	122	30	41	0.9	0.4	5.0	3.0	8.1	2.0	2.7
2023	Richmond	10	10	2	5	40	22	62	14	21	0.2	0.5	4.0	2.2	6.2	1.4	2.1
2024	Richmond	10	9	8	7	52	33	85	19	29	0.9	0.8	5.8	3.6	9.4	2.1	3.2
2025	Richmond	17	13	5	3	72	38	110	27	39	0.4	0.2	5.5	2.9	8.5	2.1	3.0
Career			49	31	22	247	141	388	91	134	0.6	0.5	5.0	2.9	7.9	1.9	2.7

== Personal life ==
He is the sixth in the Rioli family to play in the AFL, following his father Maurice, cousin Dean, cousin Cyril, nephew Daniel and cousin Willie.
