= Daniel Rioli =

Australian rules footballer (born 1997)

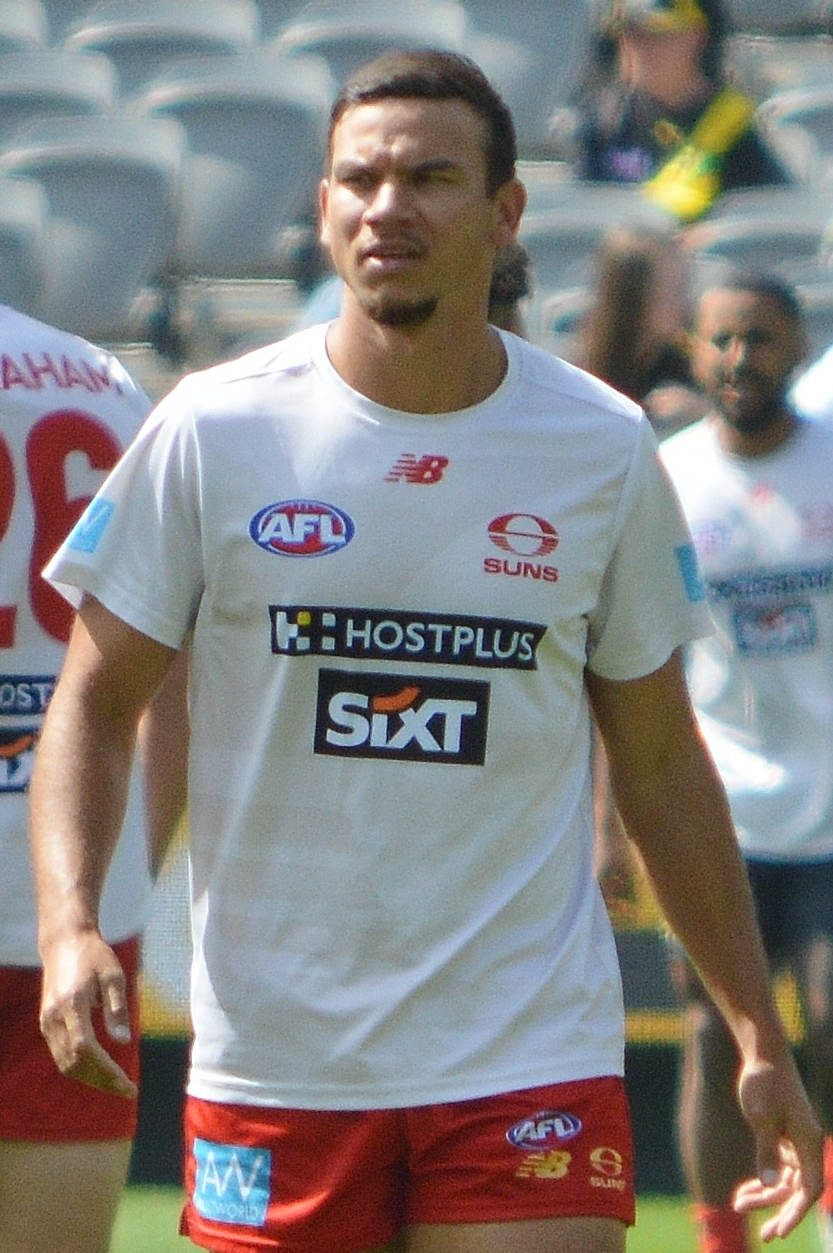
- Rioli with Gold Coast in March 2026

Personal information
- Born: 16 April 1997 (age 29); Fremantle, Western Australia
- Original team: North Ballarat Rebels (TAC Cup)/St Marys (NTFL)/East Point Football Club
- Draft: No. 15, 2015 national draft
- Debut: Round 1, 2016, Richmond vs. Carlton, at MCG
- Height: 179 cm (5 ft 10 in)
- Weight: 76 kg (168 lb)
- Position: Half-back

Club information
- Current club: Gold Coast
- Number: 17

Playing career^{1}
Years	Club	Games (Goals)
2016–2024	Richmond	183 (109)
2025–	Gold Coast	40 (10)
Total		223 (119)
- ^{1} Playing statistics correct to the end of 2026.

Career highlights
- 3× AFL premiership player: 2017, 2019, 2020; Jack Dyer Medal: 2024; AFL Goal of the Year: 2017; Ian Stewart Medal: 2024; 22under22 team: 2017; AFL Rising Star nominee: 2016; Richmond Life Member: 2017

Daniel Rioli (born 16 April 1997) is a professional Australian rules footballer playing for the Gold Coast Suns in the Australian Football League (AFL). Before moving to Gold Coast in 2024, Rioli was a three-time premiership player with Richmond and in 2017 he received the award for the AFL's Goal of the Year.

== Early life and junior football ==
Rioli was born in Fremantle, Western Australia and grew up in Pirlangimpi on Melville Island, among the Tiwi Islands of the Northern Territory. He first attended high school at St John's Catholic College in Darwin and played competitive football with the St Mary's Football Club in the Northern Territory Football League. He moved away from home to Victoria at age 14 however, where he boarded at St Patricks College in Ballarat and played in the school's 2015 state schools championship winning side.

In 2015 he played nine matches for the North Ballarat Rebels in the TAC Cup, including a four-goal performance in the club's qualifying final against the Geelong Falcons.

Rioli played representative football for the Northern Territory in the 2015 Under-18 championships where he appeared in three matches for the side. He went on to play as part of the Under-18s Allies in a match against the AFL Academy held prior to the 2015 AFL Grand Final in which he kicked four goals.

At the 2015 Draft Combine he recorded impressive results, finishing second in the 20 metre sprint and first in the 30 metre repeat sprint tests.

== AFL career ==
=== 2016 season ===
Rioli was drafted by Richmond with the club's first selection and the 15th pick overall in the 2015 national draft.

He made his AFL debut in round 1 of the 2016 AFL season in a victory against the club's traditional rival Carlton at the MCG. He did not play the following week, sitting out one match with a minor leg injury. Rioli kicked his first career goal in his next match, a round 3 loss to Adelaide. He missed another match in round 9, this time to travel home because of an illness in the family. At the mid-season bye he had played 10 of a possible 12 matches and kicked six goals over that span. He missed two matches after the bye, this time in rounds 14 and 15 before returning in round 16 and remaining in the side for the final eight matches of the season. Rioli won nomination for the 2016 AFL Rising Star award after a 16 disposal, four tackle and two goal performance in the club's round 22 loss to St Kilda. He finished his debut season having played 18 matches and kicking a club sixth-best 13 goals. He also finished ranked sixth at the clubs for tackles and was awarded the Cosgrove–Jenkins Award as Richmond's best first-year player.

=== 2017 season ===
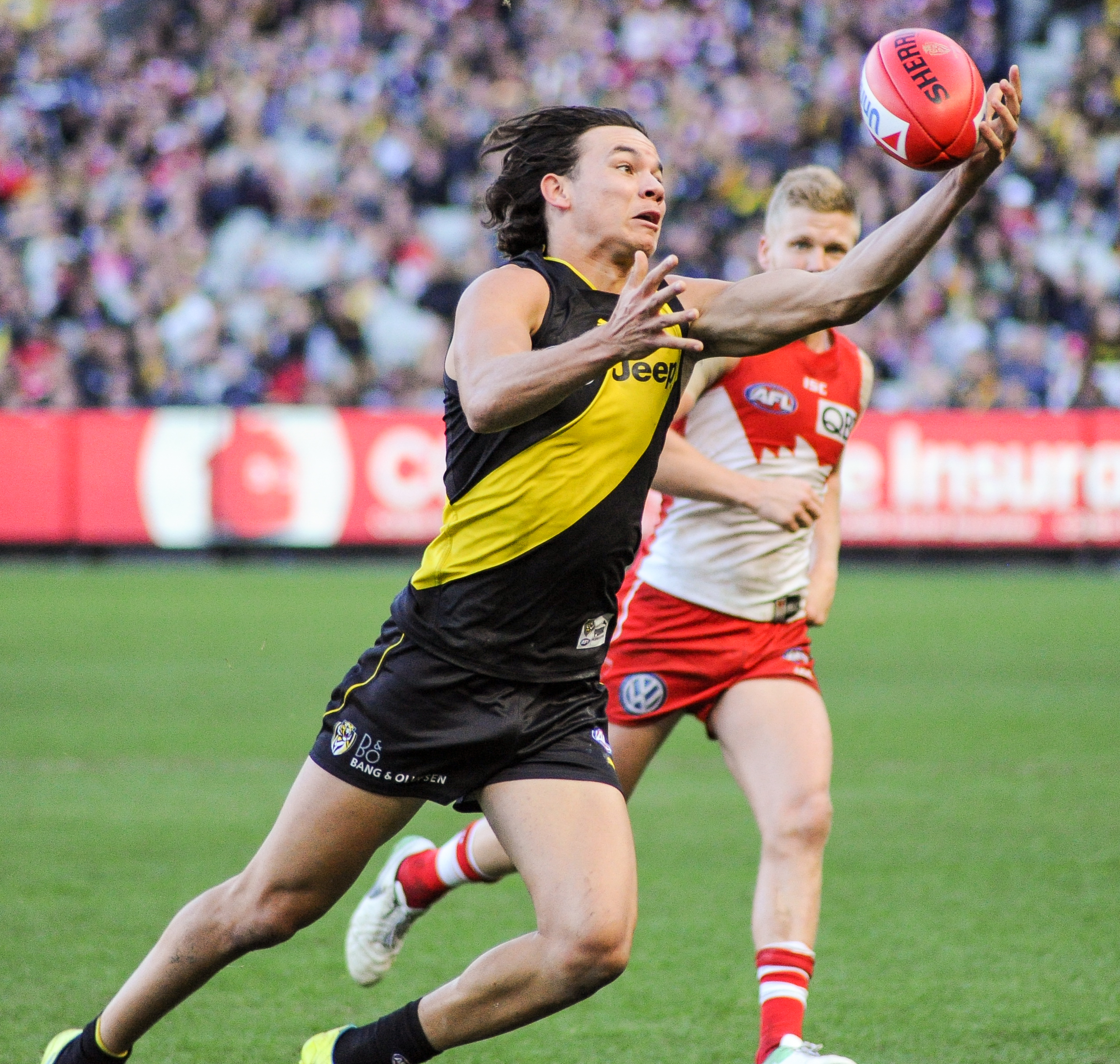
Rioli gathers the ball in round 13 of the 2017 season

Rioli, along with forward-line companions Jason Castagna and Dan Butler, played a key role in Richmond's five game unbeaten start to the 2017 season. After five rounds the small-forward trio had combined for 23 goals (Rioli with eight) and 44 tackles (10 for Rioli). Rioli earned a goal of the week nomination in round 3 for a boundary line snap in the club's win over West Coast. In addition to his work on-field, Rioli was impressive with his leadership off-field. Captain Trent Cotchin lauded Rioli for his leadership and maturity, saying "He's been nothing short of outstanding and taking other guys that we’ve drafted into the club under his wing this season has been really special.” In April, coach Damien Hardwick said a midfield role lay in Rioli's future, once the young forward developed the aerobic capacity required to play higher up the ground. After six rounds, Rioli was tied-second at the club for goals scored that season. His 76.9% conversion rate was the best of Richmond's top five goal kickers. At the mid-season bye Rioli had played in all 11 Richmond AFL matches and kicked a total of 12 goals. In round 19 he kicked a then career-best three goals, with all coming in the first quarter of the club's win over Gold Coast. To that point he ranked fourth among all forwards in the league for both turnovers created and points from turnovers created. When September came Rioli would play in his first career final, turning in eight disposals and four tackles in a qualifying final victory over Geelong. He turned in a starring performance the next week though, kicking a career-high four goals as he helped Richmond towards their first Grand Final since his uncle Maurice did so in 1982. There he became a premiership player, contributing 11 disposals and five tackles in his side's 48 point victory over minor premiers Adelaide. He did not come away unscathed however, suffering a broken foot that would require surgery and at least three months of rest and rehabilitation. At season's end Rioli was named on the bench of the AFL Players' Association's 22 Under 22 team which recognises the best young players in the league. He also received the league Goal of the Year award for his round 3 snap, despite it not winning the fan vote for that round's best. Rioli ranked first at Richmond and eighth in the league for tackles inside 50 in the 2017 season.

=== 2018 season ===
The lingering effects of his previous year's foot injury saw Rioli miss the entirety of the club's 2018 pre-season training including a second surgery to remove the previously inserted metal plates. Initial forecasts had Rioli slated to begin running again in early January but these proved overly optimistic. His return to training would instead be delayed until late January, with club officials at that time still remaining optimistic that he would be fit for a round 1 return to AFL action. Again, these predictions proved optimistic, with Rioli ruled no chance to play in round 1 from as far out as early March. He returned to full training after round 5 of the AFL season but club doctors remained tight-lipped on an expected match-day return date given his significant lack of conditioning. He set a personal goal to play in the club's round 11 Dreamtime at the 'G match with Essendon and appeared close to the mark when upgraded to 'possible' on the club's injury list in mid-May. He made his return to competitive football, albeit in limited game-time and via the club's reserve side in the VFL, in the weekend of the AFL's round 9. He played a further three matches at the lower level, increasing playing time with each. Rioli finally earned a return to AFL football in round 13's win over Geelong at the MCG. There he set a new career-high with eight tackles, was named in the club's best players by the Herald Sun and was one of five Richmond players to earn a vote in the Coaches Association's player of the year award. Two weeks later he attracted similar praise for kicking a two-goal performance in a win over Adelaide where he left the field early with a suspected but ultimately unfounded groin injury. Rioli showed no signs of injury the following week, when he kicked a season-best three goals in a tight loss to the Greater Western Sydney that saw him labelled in Richmond's best by AFL Media. He played his 50th AFL match in round 20, adding 12 disposals in a win over Geelong at the MCG. The following week Rioli set a career best with 25 disposals in a win over Gold Coast. After playing the final 10 consecutive matches of the home and away season, Rioli entered the finals series with the minor premiership winning Richmond hosting fourth placed Hawthorn in a qualifying final. Rioli added three goals in what was ultimately a 31-point win, including a notable dribble kick goal in the second quarter of that match. In the week-long break that followed, Rioli suffered a minor finger injury while completing a club training session. Despite some initial concern about the injury, Rioli would not miss a training session after scans confirmed the injury to be nothing more than a minor jarring. He played at full health and recorded 14 disposals in the club's preliminary final, a shock knock-out loss to Collingwood that brought his season to an end. Rioli finished the season having played 12 matches and set new career best averages in all major statistical categories including goals, disposals, marks and tackles.

=== 2019 season ===
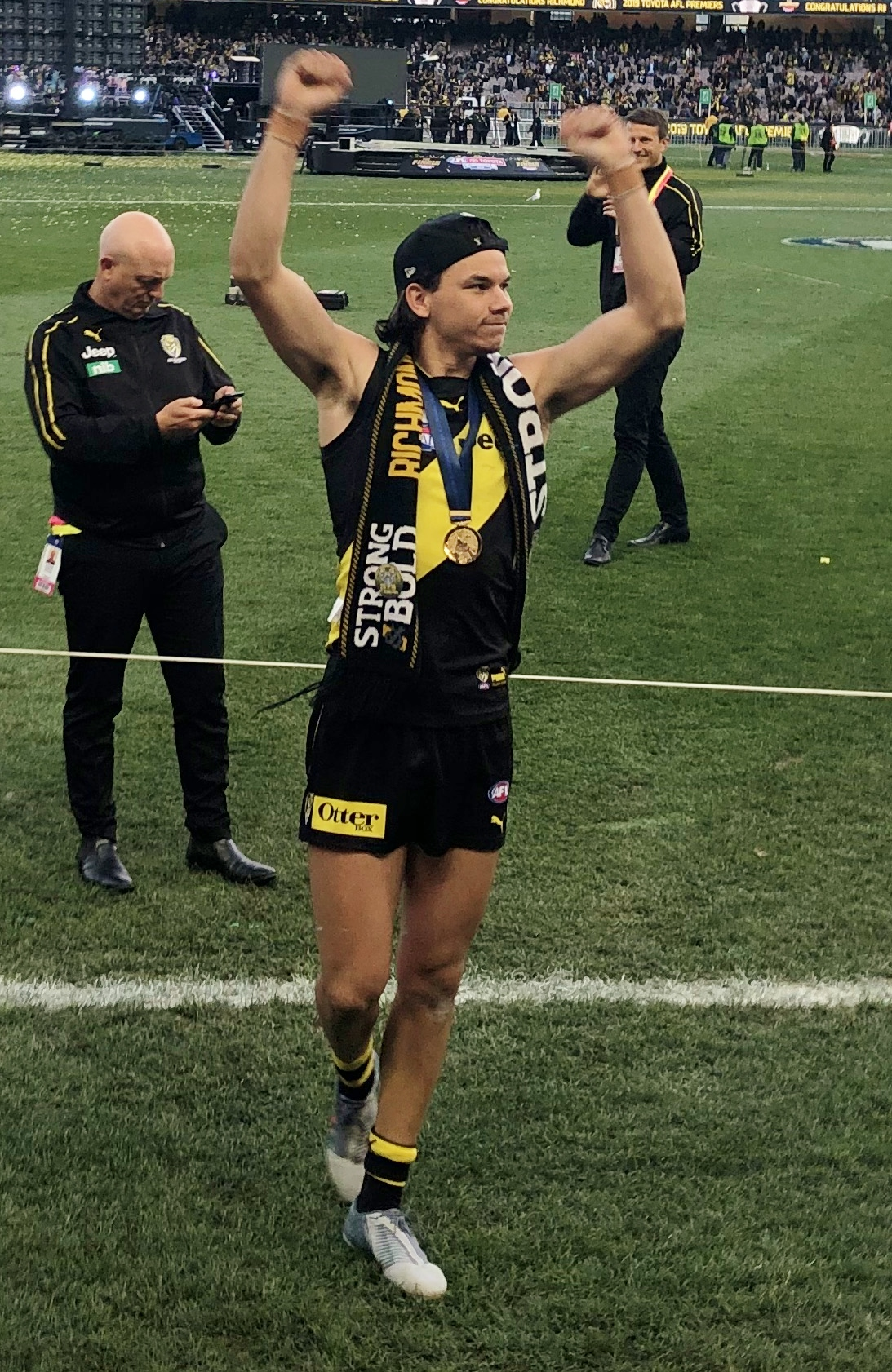
Rioli celebrates Richmond's 2019 AFL premiership victory

Rioli spend the 2018/19 off-season training as a part time midfielder in addition to his forward-line duties. He was among Richmond's best players in the first of his club's two pre-season matches, where he spend part of his time playing as a midfielder. After playing in the season-opening match against Carlton, Rioli kicked his first goal of the season in round 2 against Collingwood at the MCG. He followed that with three goals against the Greater Western Sydney in round 3, but where he also suffered bruised ribs during a collision with an opposition player. Rioli did not miss a match as a direct result of that injury, but in round 7 suffered more damage with thigh, hip and rib bruising sustained in a marking contest that would lead to him to be ruled out from playing the following week. After one week rest and recovery, Rioli failed to earn immediate selection to AFL level, instead playing one match with the club's reserves side in the VFL. Rioli returned to AFL level for the Dreamtime at the 'G match in round 10, wearing a guernsey he had designed with his mother and father and that featured imagery central to his family and the Tiwi Islands that were his childhood home, including the family totem of the turtle. He could not hold his place past that match however, immediately dropped back to VFL level the next week. It would prove to be another short stint though, with Rioli immediately recalled to AFL level after laying seven tackles in that VFL win over North Melbourne. He lifted his goalkicking tally over the next month, with five goals across the three weeks from round 13. In round 17 he recorded a season-best 18 disposals in a win over the Giants. Rioli closed out the regular season with form The Age described as "patchy", kicking three goals in total and only twice gathering more than 15 disposals in the final six weeks of the season. Rioli was named by AFL Media as one of his side's best players in a 47-point qualifying final victory over the Brisbane Lions to open the finals series, kicking two goals but suffering a rolled ankle during that match. The injury did not require significant treatment or rehabilitation and allowed Rioli to play a full match in his side's preliminary final victory over Geelong a fortnight later. His output was poor in that match however, going scoreless, contributing only nine disposals and with AFL Media noting he "didn't provide enough forward pressure." In the grand final against Greater Western Sydney, AFL Media labelled Rioli "fantastic in the forward half of the ground" despite a modest stat line that included one goal and four tackles in his side's 89-point victory that earned him a second premiership in three years. At the end of the year, Rioli placed equal-tenth in the club's best and fairest count alongside fellow small forward Jason Castagna.

=== 2020 season ===
Rioli took part in each of his club's two pre-season series matches in March before kicking an equal-team high three goals in a season-opening win over Carlton in round 1. He received four Coaches' Association award votes for his performance in that match, which was played without a crowd in attendance due to public health prohibitions on large gatherings imposed as a result of the rapid progression of the coronavirus pandemic into Australia. It was the first match of a reduced 17-round season, which was also played with quarter lengths reduced by one fifth in order to reduce the physical load on players who would be expected to play multiple matches with short breaks in the second half of the year. Just three days later, the AFL Commission suspended the season for an indefinite period after multiple states enforced quarantine conditions on their borders that effectively ruled out the possibility of continuing the season as planned. Rioli contributed six disposals when the season resumed in June after an 11-week hiatus, before another six disposal outing in round 3 saw him omitted from the club's round 4 lineup. He instead played in an unofficial scratch match against St Kilda's reserves that same week, held due to all AFL clubs' withdrawal from the VFL season. After starring with two goals at the lower level, he earned an immediate recall for the club's round 5 win over Melbourne, in which Rioli kicked one goal. Rioli held his spot for a further three matches, over which time the club was relocated to the Gold Coast in response to a virus outbreak in Melbourne. He was once again dropped from senior football in round 10, this time following an eight disposal outing against Greater Western Sydney the previous week. After two matches out, Rioli made his return to football in a round 11 loss to Port Adelaide. He was among his side's best during round 13's Dreamtime in Darwin match, recording 16 disposals, a team-high five tackles and kicking a goal in his first AFL match in his Northern Territory home. Rioli played in each of the final four matches of the regular season, before contributing a season-best two goals in a qualifying final loss to the Brisbane Lions. He had another goal and recorded 15 disposals in a semi-final win against St Kilda one week later, before adding 39 pressure points and six tackles to help his side to a preliminary final victory over Port Adelaide. Rioli became Richmond's youngest three-time premiership player ever the following week, adding four tackles in his side's 31-point grand final victory over Geelong. He finished the year having played 18 of a possible 21 matches, and placed equal 14th in the club's best and fairest count.

=== 2021 season ===
Rioli was hampered by part of the 2021 pre-season training period with an ankle injury, but was ultimately recovered to feature in both the club's pre-season match against Collingwood and its season-opening match against Carlton. After recording seven disposals in round 2, Rioli was formally omitted from the club's round 3 side, though ultimately activated as a medical substitute to replace the injured Dion Prestia in that match. He was again dropped the following week, but played reserves football in the VFL. One week later, he returned with two goals in a round 5 win over St Kilda before notching his 100th AFL game in round 6's loss to Melbourne. In early May, Rioli was punched in the face by a nightclub patron who he confronted for inappropriate behaviour to his girlfriend. Rioli faced no sanction from the league or the club for his part in the fight and he was medically cleared to play the following week despite suffering a cut to the face, going on to kick the match-winning goal in that round 9 victory over Greater Western Sydney. Following a seven-disposal showing in round 10, Rioli was once again dropped from the first-choice senior side, but was used as the medical substitute in each of the following two matches. He was returned to the starting lineup for a single game in round 13, before being dropped to reserves level for an extended period. Rioli was trialed in a new role as a half-back during his stint at VFL level and was immediately impressive, earning elevation to the club's AFL backline in round 17 following a 26-disposal game in the VFL and an injury to veteran half-back Bachar Houli. Rioli grew well into the role over the final seven weeks of the season, playing in each match and recording 20 more disposals on three occasions. With the club failing to qualify for finals, Rioli's season ended at the conclusion of the home and away season, having played 19 matches.

=== Move to Gold Coast ===
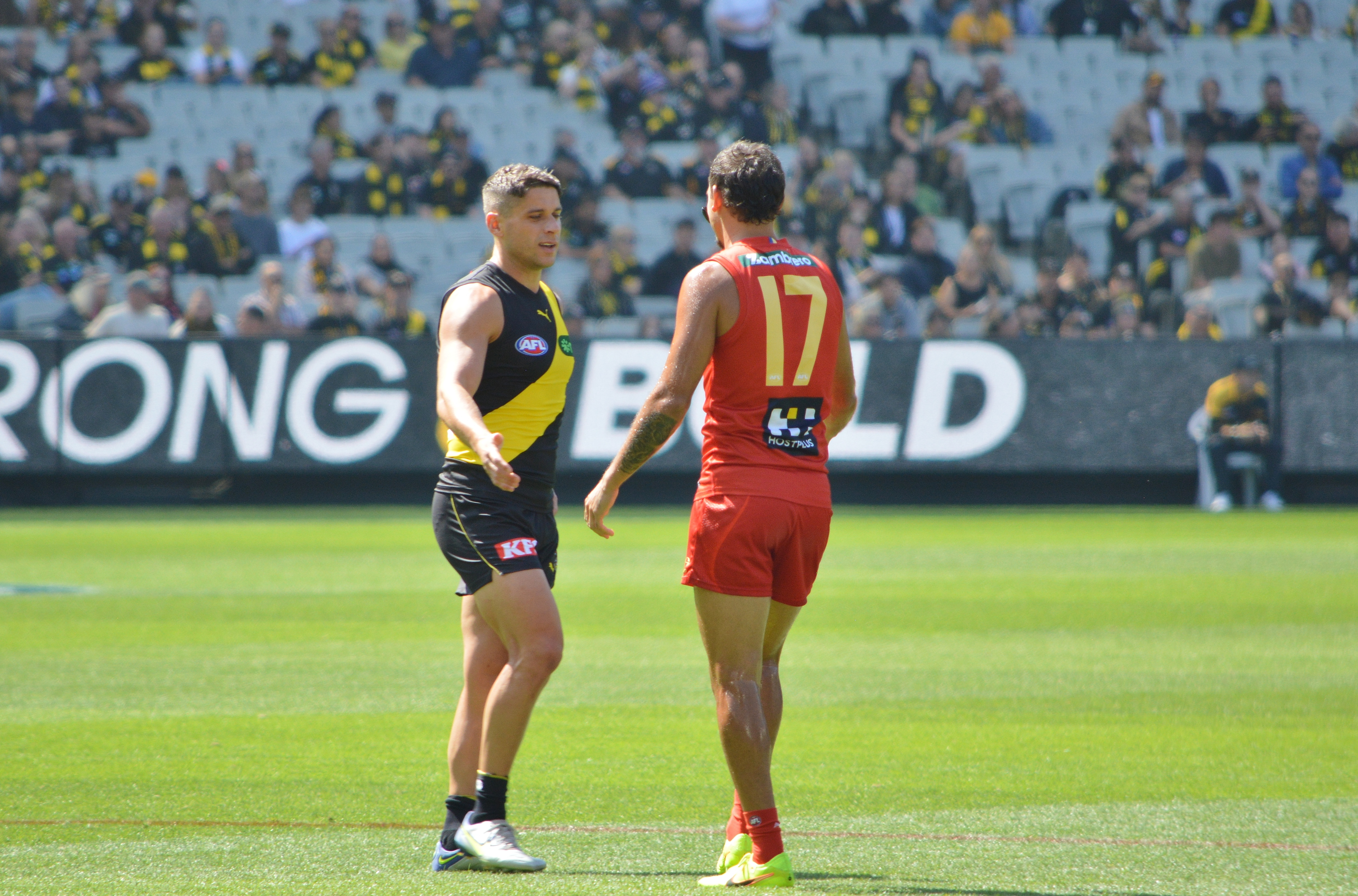
Rioli meets former teammate Dion Prestia while playing for Gold Coast in 2026

Following the 2024 AFL season, Rioli requested a trade to the Gold Coast Suns. He was traded to the Suns on the final day of trade period, joining his previous coach Damien Hardwick, and signed a five-year deal keeping him at Gold Coast until 2029.

He represented the Indigenous All-Stars when they faced Fremantle prior to the 2025 AFL season.

== Player profile ==
Rioli plays primarily as a rebounding half back. He is notable for his acceleration and sprint speed while carrying the ball out of defence.

For the first five and a half seasons of this career, Rioli played as a defensive small forward and was lauded for his ability apply forward-half pressure and create turnovers among opposition defenders.

== Statistics ==
Updated to the end of round 22, 2026.

Legend
G	Goals	K	Kicks	D	Disposals	T	Tackles
B	Behinds	H	Handballs	M	Marks

Season	Team	No.	Games	Totals							Averages (per game)							Votes
Season	Team	No.	Games	G	B	K	H	D	M	T	G	B	K	H	D	M	T	Votes
2016	Richmond	17	18	13	6	86	97	183	45	57	0.7	0.3	4.8	5.4	10.2	2.5	3.2	0
2017^{#}	Richmond	17	25	25	13	144	127	271	69	85	1.0	0.5	5.8	5.1	10.8	2.8	3.4	0
2018	Richmond	17	12	13	9	87	83	170	35	46	1.1	0.8	7.3	6.9	14.2	2.9	3.8	1
2019^{#}	Richmond	17	22	17	19	138	124	262	62	61	0.8	0.9	6.3	5.6	11.9	2.8	2.8	0
2020^{#}	Richmond	17	18	12	3	102	94	196	47	57	0.7	0.2	5.7	5.2	10.9	2.6	3.2	0
2021	Richmond	17	19	9	6	120	127	247	54	46	0.5	0.3	6.3	6.7	13.0	2.8	2.4	0
2022	Richmond	17	23	10	4	266	205	471	110	54	0.4	0.2	11.6	8.9	20.5	4.8	2.3	0
2023	Richmond	17	23	4	4	272	204	476	97	79	0.2	0.2	11.8	8.9	20.7	4.2	3.4	5
2024	Richmond	17	23	6	1	289	247	536	91	68	0.3	0.0	12.6	10.7	23.3	4.0	3.0	4
2025	Gold Coast	17	20	8	1	207	165	372	70	49	0.4	0.1	10.4	8.3	18.6	3.5	2.5	0
2026	Gold Coast	17	18	2	3	189	172	361	68	43	0.1	0.2	10.5	9.6	20.1	3.8	2.4	0
Career			221	119	69	1900	1645	3545	748	645	0.5	0.3	8.6	7.4	16.0	3.4	2.9	10

== Honours and achievements ==
Team

- 3× AFL premiership player: 2017, 2019, 2020
- McClelland Trophy (Richmond): 2018

Individual

- Jack Dyer Medal: 2024
- 22under22 team: 2017
- AFL Goal of the Year: 2017
- AFL Rising Star nominee: 2016
- All-Australian squad: 2022

== Personal life ==
Daniel Rioli's great-grandfather, Cyril Kalippa Rioli, was the patriarch of the famous Rioli family from the Tiwi Islands in the Northern Territory and his grandfather, Sebastian 'Sibby' Rioli, was a prominent footballer for St Mary's in the NTFL as well as for South Fremantle in the WAFL. His father, Bradley Rioli, was also a footballer who played for the Tiwi Bombers in the NTFL. Daniel is the fourth in the Rioli family to play in the AFL, following in the footsteps of uncles Dean and Maurice as well as cousin Cyril. His older cousin Willie Rioli joined the family's playing ranks when he debuted in 2018. He is also cousin to former Essendon player Michael Long as well as his son Jake and nephew Ben.

Rioli lived with Richmond senior coach Damien Hardwick and his family for the first two years of his AFL career. In March 2018 he began dating Mia Fevola, the daughter of former Carlton and Brisbane Lions forward, Brendan Fevola. They announced their separation in February 2020. Rioli is now married to Paris Lawrence, a disc jockey. The pair began dating in 2021, and officially tied the knot in 2025 at a ceremony in Byron Bay.
