= Rioli family =

The Rioli family are a notable Australian rules football family from the Tiwi Islands in the Northern Territory.

Six family members have played in the Australian Football League (AFL), with a further five playing in the West Australian Football League for South Fremantle. Many more family members have played for the Tiwi Bombers or St Mary's in the Northern Territory Football League (NTFL) and the Northern Territory Thunder in the North East Australian Football League (NEAFL). Nineteen members of the family have played a combined total of more than 1000 games for St Mary's. Cyril Rioli, Sr. (7 July 1934 – 3 June 2014) was awarded an Order of Australia Medal in 2014 for services to develop the Tiwi Island community.

- Sebastian (Sibby) Rioli (17 Jan 1954 – 3 May 2012): South Fremantle (1972–1976)
- Maurice Rioli (1957–2010): South Fremantle (1975–1981,1988–1990), Richmond (1982–1987)
- John Rioli: South Fremantle colts Jack Clarke Medal 1982
- Cyril Rioli Jr: South Fremantle (1987)
- Willie Rioli Sr (21 Feb 1972 – 12 July 2022): South Fremantle (1989–1990, 1994)
- Dean Rioli (born 1978): South Fremantle (1995–1997), Essendon (1999–2006)
- Cyril Rioli (born 1989): Hawthorn (2008–2018)
- Daniel Rioli (born 1997): Richmond (2016–2024) Gold Coast Suns (2025–)
- Willie Rioli (born 1995): West Coast (2018–2022), Port Adelaide (2023–2025)
- Ben Rioli (born 1993): South Fremantle (2020–)
- Maurice Rioli Jr (born 2002): Richmond (2021–)

Michael Long, Benny Vigona, and current AFL Women's player Danielle Ponter are also related to the Rioli family by marriage.

Cyril Sr	Helena
Sibby	Maurice	Cecillia, Manyi, Lawrence, John, Maria & Francis	Benny & Tony Vigona	Georgina Vigona	Willie Sr	Cyril Jr	Cathy Long	Michael, Sue, Noel, Brian, John, Patrick, Stephen & Chris Long
Dean	Bradley	Ben	Shannon, Clinton & Sebastian	Maurice Jr	Donna, Kristen; Rhyannon, Gavin & Maria	Willie Jr	Cyril Jr	Anthony, Ben, Jake, Michaela Long & Danielle Ponter
Daniel

== See also ==
- Riolo (disambiguation)
- Rio (disambiguation)
- Ríos (disambiguation)
