= Ben Long (footballer) =

Australian rules footballer (born 1997)

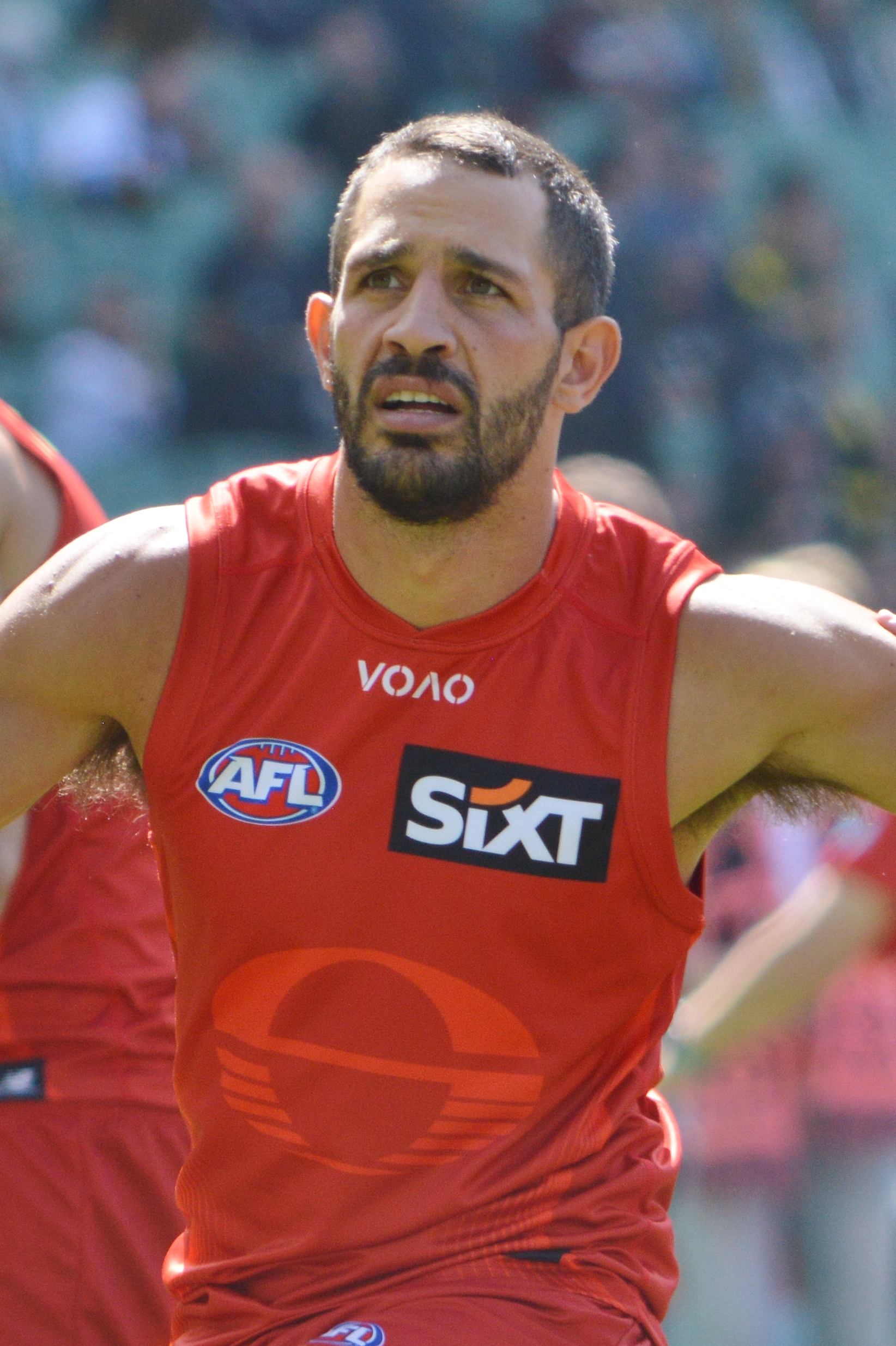
- Long playing for Gold Coast in March 2026

Personal information
- Full name: Ben Long
- Born: 21 August 1997 (age 29); Darwin, Northern Territory
- Original teams: St Mary's (NTFL); Footscray Bulldogs (VFL); NT Thunder (NEAFL)
- Draft: No. 25, 2016 national draft
- Debut: Round 4, 2017, St Kilda vs. Collingwood, at Etihad Stadium
- Height: 183 cm (6 ft 0 in)
- Weight: 81 kg (179 lb)
- Position: Defender/Forward

Club information
- Current club: Gold Coast
- Number: 22

Playing career^{1}
Years	Club	Games (Goals)
2017–2022	St Kilda	79 (31)
2023–	Gold Coast	77 (99)
Total		156 (130)

Representative team honours
Years	Team	Games (Goals)
2025	Indigenous All-Stars	1 (0)
- ^{1} Playing statistics correct to the end of the 2026 season.

Career highlights
- AFL Rising Star nominee: 2018

Ben Long (born 21 August 1997) is a professional Australian rules footballer playing for the Gold Coast Suns in the Australian Football League (AFL).

== Early life ==
Long was born in Darwin, Northern Territory into a family of Indigenous Australian descent (Anmatjerre, Malak-Malak & Tiwi). His grandfather, Jack Long Sr, and his father, Chris Long, were both premiership winning footballers for St Mary's in the Northern Territory Football League. As a member of the Rioli-Long family he shares numerous relations with other notable footballers including dual Essendon premiership player and 1993 Norm Smith Medallist Michael Long (uncle), four-time Hawthorn premiership player and 2015 Norm Smith Medallist Cyril Rioli (cousin), three-time Richmond premiership player Daniel Rioli (nephew), 2018 West Coast premiership player Junior Rioli (cousin) and dual Adelaide AFLW premiership player Danielle Ponter (cousin). He has Chinese and English heritage from his paternal grandfather Jack Long.

Ben grew up playing junior football for St Mary's in the NTFL junior leagues and in 2014, at the age of 16, he moved interstate to Victoria when he accepted a scholarship to attend Melbourne Grammar. In 2016, he played in Footscray's VFL premiership winning team. Along with football, Long played rugby union for the Casuarina Cougars as a youngster alongside future AFL player Brandan Parfitt before quitting to focus solely on football as a teenager.

== AFL career ==
=== St Kilda ===
Long was drafted by the St Kilda Football Club with their first selection and twenty-fifth overall in the 2016 national draft. He made his debut in the fourteen point win against Collingwood at Etihad Stadium in round four of the 2017 season. Long was nominated for the AFL Rising Star for his performance in the draw against Greater Western Sydney at Etihad Stadium in round five of the 2018 AFL season, during which he recorded fifteen disposals, eight tackles, four marks and a goal. In the final game of St Kilda's 2022 season, Long compiled a career-best performance against the Sydney Swans which included 27 disposals, 17 marks, 13 intercepts and one goal with a disposal efficiency of 96 per cent on his 25th birthday.

Following his 2022 season, Long requested a trade to Gold Coast after playing six seasons at St Kilda. He was traded on 5 October 2022.

=== Gold Coast ===
Long spent his first season in defence for the Suns. After struggling to cement his position in the team, new coach Damian Hardwick made a move to push Long forward and he became a prolific goalkicker. In round 12, 2024, Long kicked a career-best four goals against Essendon. He equalled this feat in the opening game of the following year against West Coast. The second of these performances began a string of career-best form in 2025 for Long, joining Champion Data's list of the ten best players in the competition early in the year.

== Statistics ==
Updated to the end of round 22, 2026.

Legend
G	Goals	K	Kicks	D	Disposals	T	Tackles
B	Behinds	H	Handballs	M	Marks

Season	Team	No.	Games	Totals							Averages (per game)							Votes
Season	Team	No.	Games	G	B	K	H	D	M	T	G	B	K	H	D	M	T	Votes
2017	St Kilda	21	4	0	2	15	21	36	6	13	0.0	0.5	3.8	5.3	9.0	1.5	3.3	0
2018	St Kilda	21	10	7	4	58	62	120	28	27	0.7	0.4	5.8	6.2	12.0	2.8	2.7	0
2019	St Kilda	21	16	14	9	101	51	152	59	45	0.9	0.6	6.3	3.2	9.5	3.7	2.8	0
2020 (Note: The 2020 season was played with 17 home-and-away matches per team (down from 22) and 16-minute quarters with time on (down from 20-minute quarters with time on) due to the impact of the COVID-19 pandemic.)	St Kilda	21	15	0	1	90	94	184	49	30	0.0	0.1	6.0	6.3	12.3	3.3	2.0	2
2021	St Kilda	21	15	2	9	94	49	143	52	35	0.1	0.6	6.3	3.3	9.5	3.5	2.3	0
2022	St Kilda	21	19	8	6	128	97	225	74	58	0.4	0.3	6.7	5.1	11.8	3.9	3.1	2
2023	Gold Coast	22	15	0	1	114	57	171	42	34	0.0	0.1	7.6	3.8	11.4	2.8	2.3	0
2024	Gold Coast	22	17	26	17	122	51	173	62	46	1.5	1.0	7.2	3.0	10.2	3.6	2.7	0
2025	Gold Coast	22	24	45	26	192	67	259	109	46	1.9	1.1	8.0	2.8	10.8	4.5	1.9	1
2026	Gold Coast	22	19	26	13	123	77	200	58	45	1.4	0.7	6.5	4.1	10.5	3.1	2.4	0
Career			154	128	88	1037	626	1663	539	379	0.8	0.6	6.7	4.1	10.8	3.5	2.5	5
