= St John's College, Darwin =

St John's Catholic College

Location
- Darwin, Northern Territory; Australia; 12°26′37.81″S 130°50′23.23″E

Information
- Type: co-educational secondary day and boarding school
- Motto: Strong in Faith
- Religious affiliations: Missionaries of the Sacred Heart; Daughters of Our Lady of the Sacred Heart
- Denomination: Roman Catholic
- Patron saint: St John the Evangelist
- Established: 1960; 66 years ago
- Founder: John O'Loughlin MSC
- Principal: Cameron Hughes
- Years: 7–12
- Enrolment: ~320
- Campus: Salonika Street, The Gardens
- Colours: Red and gold
- Website: www.stjohnsnt.catholic.edu.au

St John's Catholic College is a Roman Catholic co-educational secondary school based on the Missionaries of the Sacred Heart and Daughters of Our Lady of the Sacred Heart traditions. It is located in Darwin, Northern Territory, Australia, on Salonika Street. The College provides a religious and general education for day and boarding students from Year 7 to Year 12. The school was established in 1960 at its site in the central Darwin suburb of The Gardens.

== History ==
Originally named St John's College, it was originally established for boys only by the Bishop of Darwin, John Patrick O'Loughlin, in 1960, on a site adjacent to the Darwin Botanical Gardens. Father John Burford MSC was appointed the first Rector of the college which operated out of buildings next to St Mary's Cathedral, while building commenced. In this respect the college would continue to be operated by the Missionaries of the Sacred Heart. By December 1960 enough had been completed to allow the school to move into its site. From 1961 and 1966 the college continued to grow, eventually welcoming the arrival of the first college boarders. In 1972 the Our Lady of the Sacred Heart College for girls was opened on the Mindil beach side of the site, operated by the Daughters of Our Lady of the Sacred Heart.

In December 1974, Cyclone Tracy devastated the college buildings and as a result reconstruction became a major focus of the college. In 1975, it was decided that the two colleges would be merged as a co-educational college with two schools, a Middle school and a Senior school. With 1975 being the college's 25th anniversary, it was commemorated by the construction of Jubilee Hall. The 1970s also saw the phasing out of primary schooling and the school head changing from Rector to Principal.

In 1989 a College Board was established and St John's was confirmed as an independent school of the Missionaries of the Sacred Heart. However, with the departure of Principal Father Robert Irvine at the end of the 1990s, the direct association of the Missionaries of the Sacred Heart within the college ended and led to the appointment of the first lay Principal, Gerard Keating.

In 2009, the College was purchased by the Catholic Education Office of Darwin and is now a systemic Catholic school under the leadership of the Bishop of Darwin.

=== Symbols ===
The college crest is emblazoned with an eagle, which alludes to artistic representations of the college's namesake, Saint John the Evangelist, which in turn symbolises the heights to which he rose in the first chapter of his Gospel. The quill held by the eagle represents the word of God. The motto of the College, "Strong in Faith", reflects the ethos of the college and also the religious foundations of the school.

== Notable alumni ==
- Barry O'Farrell – former Premier of New South Wales
- Maurice Rioli – Former Australian rules footballer and member of the NT Legislative Assembly
- Nova Peris – The first Aboriginal Australian and the first person from the Northern Territory to win an Olympic gold medal, and a former member of the Australian Senate
- Stan Tipiloura – Indigenous Australian politician and member of the NT Legislative Assembly (1987–1992)
- Scott Chisholm
- Ronnie Burns
- Michael Long
- Cyril Rioli
- Daniel Rioli
- Willie Rioli
- Nathan Buckley
- Maurice Rioli Jr
- Andrew McLeod

== See also ==
- List of schools in the Northern Territory
- City of Darwin
