= Edward Holland =

Edward Holland may refer to:

- Edward Holland (mayor) (1702–1756), mayor of New York, 1747–1757
- Edward Holland (MP) (1806–1875), British member of parliament for East Worcestershire and Evesham
- Edward Holland (priest) (1838–1918), Irish priest and writer
- Edward Holland (bishop) (born 1936), English bishop, former Suffragan Bishop in Europe
- Eddie Holland (Edward Holland Jr., born 1939), American singer, part of Motown's Holland-Dozier-Holland songwriting team
- Edward E. Holland (1861–1941), American politician, U.S. representative from Suffolk, Virginia
- Edward J. Holland, governor of Madras (see Avadhanum Paupiah)
- Edward Holland (Canadian Army officer) (1878–1948), Canadian soldier, recipient of Victoria Cross
- Edward M. Holland (born 1939), Arlington attorney and member of the Virginia Senate, 1972–1996
- Ed Holland (1918–2009), American editorial cartoonist
- Edward F. Holland (1931 or 1932–2015), American politician, member of the Rhode Island Senate
