= Raftery =

Raftery is a surname originating in Ireland, predominantly in County Mayo, County Galway and County Roscommon. Edward MacLysaght observes that 'Raftery, sometimes confused with Rafferty, is quite a different name', originating as 'O'Reachtaire', 'reacht' meaning 'decree'.

== Famous Rafterys ==
- Adrian Raftery (born 1955), Irish and American statistician and sociologist
- Adrian Raftery (author) (born 1971), Australian author, journalist, businessman and lecturer
- Andrew Raftery (born 1962), American contemporary printmaker, painter and arts educator
- Antoine Ó Raifteirí (Anthony Raftery) (blind Irish language poet)
- Barry Raftery (1944–2010), Irish archaeologist and Celtic scholar
- Bill Raftery (born 1943), American basketball analyst and former college basketball coach
- Mary Raftery (1957–2012), Irish investigative journalist, filmmaker and writer
- Pat Raftery (disambiguation), several people with this name
- Peter Raftery (1929–1996), High Commissioner to Botswana
- Ronan Raftery, Irish actor
- Tom Raftery (born 1933), Irish politician
- Tom Raftery (baseball) (1881–1954), American baseball player
- W. C. Raftery (1887–1965), American football, basketball and baseball coach
