= Willie Rioli =

Australian rules footballer

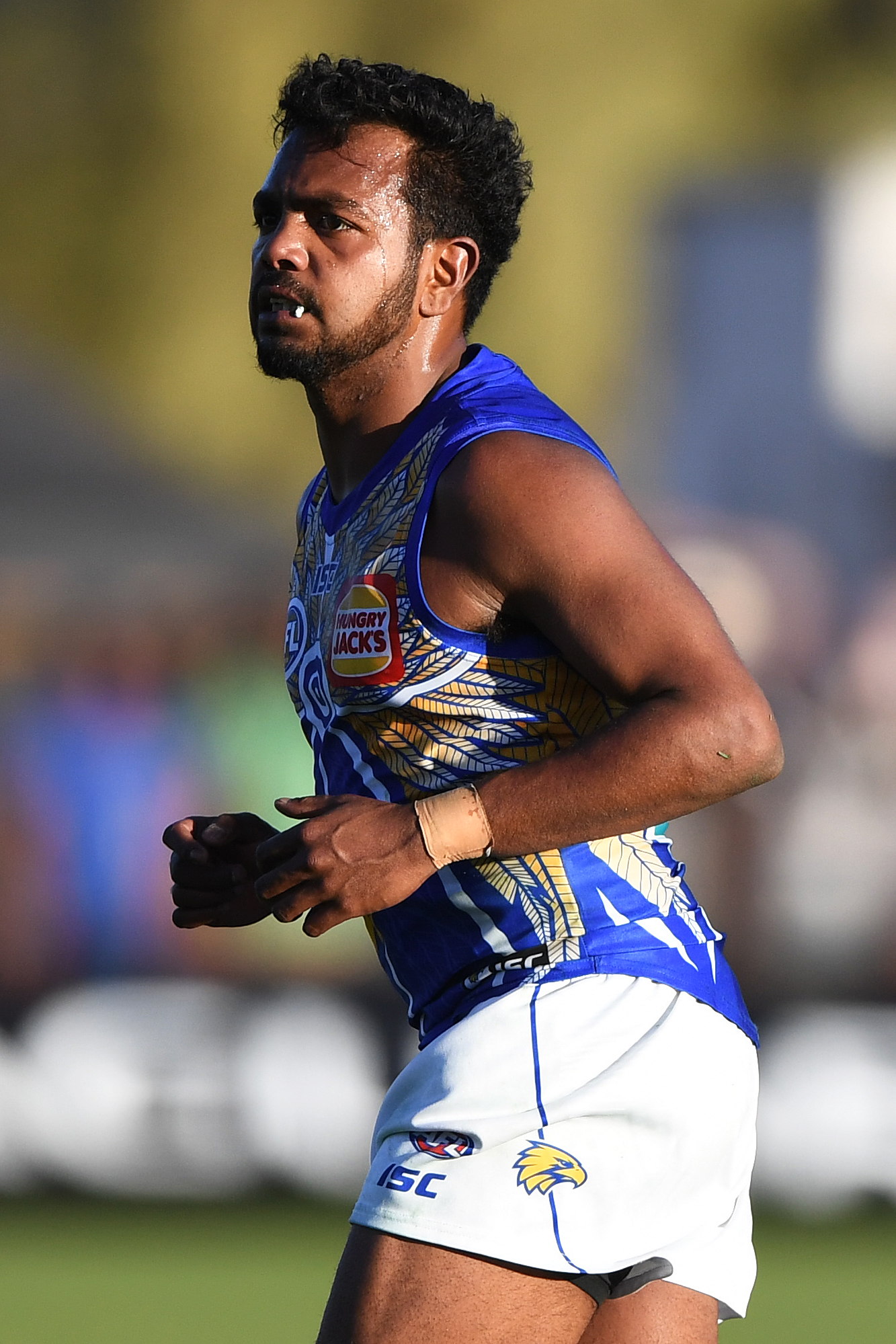
- Rioli playing for West Coast in July 2019

Personal information
- Full name: William Vigona-Rioli Jr.
- Born: 4 June 1995 (age 31); Tiwi Islands
- Original team: Glenelg (SANFL)
- Draft: No. 52, 2016 national draft
- Debut: Round 2, 2018, West Coast vs. Western Bulldogs, at Etihad Stadium
- Height: 175 cm (5 ft 9 in)
- Position: Forward

Playing career
Years	Club	Games (Goals)
2017–2022	West Coast	51 (60)
2023–2025	Port Adelaide	58 (91)
Total		109 (151)

Representative team honours
Years	Team	Games (Goals)
	Indigenous All-Stars	1 (1)

Career highlights
- AFL premiership player: 2018

William Vigona-Rioli Jr (born 4 June 1995), formerly known as Junior Rioli, (Note: Rioli was known as Junior from 19 August 2022 to 19 July 2023 after the death of his father in accordance to Tiwi custom.) is a former professional Australian rules footballer who played for West Coast and Port Adelaide in the Australian Football League (AFL). Coming from the Rioli family, he is the son of former South Fremantle player Willie Rioli Sr., he is also the first cousin of Dean Rioli (Essendon Football Club), Cyril Rioli (Hawthorn Football Club) and Ronnie Burns (from his mother's side), first cousin once removed of current Gold Coast Suns player Daniel Rioli and the nephew of Maurice Rioli.

== Early life ==
Rioli was raised in Tiwi Islands and later boarded at Xavier College in Melbourne. He completed his final year of school at Clontarf Aboriginal College in Perth and played colts and reserves for South Fremantle. Rioli later moved to Adelaide, South Australia and played for Glenelg in the South Australian National Football League (SANFL) in 2015 and 2016 before being drafted by the West Coast Eagles with their third selection and fifty-second overall in the 2016 national draft.

== AFL career ==
The small forward made his debut in the 51-point win against the Western Bulldogs at Etihad Stadium in round two of the 2018 season. Following his debut, Rioli didn't miss a game for the rest of the season as the Eagles went on to win the 2018 AFL Grand Final against Collingwood. Rioli kicked his team's first goal of the match. He also won West Coast's Emerging Talent award for his successful debut year.

Following 2021's ban on Rioli for marijuana possession, he recommenced training with the West Coast Eagles just 2 months later in June 2021. Rioli was scheduled to play his first game back in round 23 of the 2021 AFL season but was ruled out the week prior due to a tight hamstring.

Rioli requested a trade to Port Adelaide at the conclusion of the 2022 AFL season in a move that Eagles CEO Trevor Nisbett described as "bitterly disappointing". The trade was confirmed on 10 October 2022.

Prior to the 2025 AFL season, Rioli was selected to play in the Indigenous All-Stars team against Fremantle. He kicked a goal alongside other indigenous Port Adelaide players. Rioli played his 100th AFL game in the round 11 loss to Fremantle during Sir Doug Nicholls Round.

After a difficult 2025 season on and off the field, Rioli retired from the AFL after 109 games and 151 goals across his two clubs.

== Controversies ==
=== Drugs ===
In September 2019, Rioli received an indefinite provisional suspension under the AFL and Australian Sports Anti-Doping Authority anti-doping code for an alleged adverse analytical finding for urine substitution. Rioli publicly admitted to having smoked marijuana with other club members the night before his drug test, and attempted to swap his tainted urine with a clean sample in a Gatorade bottle. He was subsequently issued with an indefinite suspension from the AFL, and ruled out from competing with the West Coast Eagles in that year's Finals series. Following a long anti-doping review by the AFL, Rioli was eventually handed a back-dated two-year suspension in March 2021.

On 23 April 2021, Rioli was transiting through Darwin Airport where he was stopped and searched after drug detection dogs gave a positive indication that he was carrying an illicit substance. He was caught carrying 25 grams of marijuana in his pants, and was subsequently arrested and issued with a court attendance notice. He later pleaded guilty in court, and was given a 12-month good behaviour bond.

=== Social media post against Hawthorn ===
In April 2025, following a win by Port Adelaide over Hawthorn, Rioli took to social media stating: "Play with fire, you’re gonna get burnt. My hatred for this club goes way pass [sic] last year [sic] antics, what they did to my dad, and my brother, is why I can’t stand them. Not the players. #Cococlub." This referred to the Hawthorn Football Club historical racism allegations involving Rioli's cousin (referred to in his statement as brother) Cyril Rioli. The post led to online racist abuse towards Willie Rioli, and he soon deleted the post. The following day, Port Adelaide issued a statement saying they acknowledged Rioli's pain, but that his social media post was inappropriate; he was granted leave to skip Tuesday's training session.

=== Violent threats ===
Following a fiery May 2025 match against the Western Bulldogs, Rioli privately messaged opposition defender Bailey Dale. Rioli sent an indirect threat towards Dale, warning him to be careful while visiting Darwin, where the Bulldogs were set to play the following week. While the AFL dismissed the off-field incident, further allegations surfaced of similar threats against Geelong and Essendon players in 2024, which led the league to reinvestigate the threats. Rioli was suspended for one match, the Showdown against Adelaide, which he had chosen to withdraw from regardless of the AFL's decision.

== Statistics ==
Legend
G	Goals	K	Kicks	D	Disposals	T	Tackles
B	Behinds	H	Handballs	M	Marks
#	Played in that season's premiership team

Season	Team	No.	Games	Totals							Averages (per game)							Votes
Season	Team	No.	Games	G	B	K	H	D	M	T	G	B	K	H	D	M	T	Votes
2018^{#}	West Coast	44	24	28	14	182	90	272	77	63	1.2	0.6	7.6	3.8	11.3	3.2	2.6	0
2019	West Coast	44	14	18	10	121	65	186	47	42	1.3	0.7	8.6	4.6	13.3	3.4	3.0	0
2020 (Note: The 2020 season was played with 17 home-and-away matches per team (down from 22) and 16-minute quarters with time on (down from 20-minute quarters with time on) due to the impact of the COVID-19 pandemic.)	West Coast	44	0	—	—	—	—	—	—	—	—	—	—	—	—	—	—	0
2021	West Coast	44	0	—	—	—	—	—	—	—	—	—	—	—	—	—	—	0
2022	West Coast	44	13	14	3	104	52	156	41	41	1.1	0.2	8.0	4.0	12.0	3.2	3.2	1
2023	Port Adelaide	15	19	31	17	136	69	205	52	47	1.6	0.9	7.2	3.6	10.8	2.7	2.5	0
2024	Port Adelaide	15	20	33	20	149	43	192	44	59	1.7	1.0	7.5	2.2	9.6	2.2	3.0	0
2025	Port Adelaide	15	19	27	12	128	58	186	49	34	1.4	0.6	6.7	3.1	9.8	2.6	1.8	0
Career			109	151	76	820	377	1197	310	286	1.4	0.7	7.5	3.5	11.0	2.8	2.6	1
