= Edward Holland (priest) =

Fr. Edward Holland O.D.C. was an Irish priest and writer (1838–1918).

Born in Kilreekill, County Galway. Studied in Belgium where he was ordained in 1860. Elected provincial of his Discalced Carmelite order on six occasions. A well-known nationalist, he contributed to the United Irishman; at one period he was one of two people publishing it exclusively.

He was a great-granduncle of Rev. Martin Coen, who was a grand-nephew of Fr. Thomas Cawley.
