= 1992 Arafura by-election =

7 November 1992

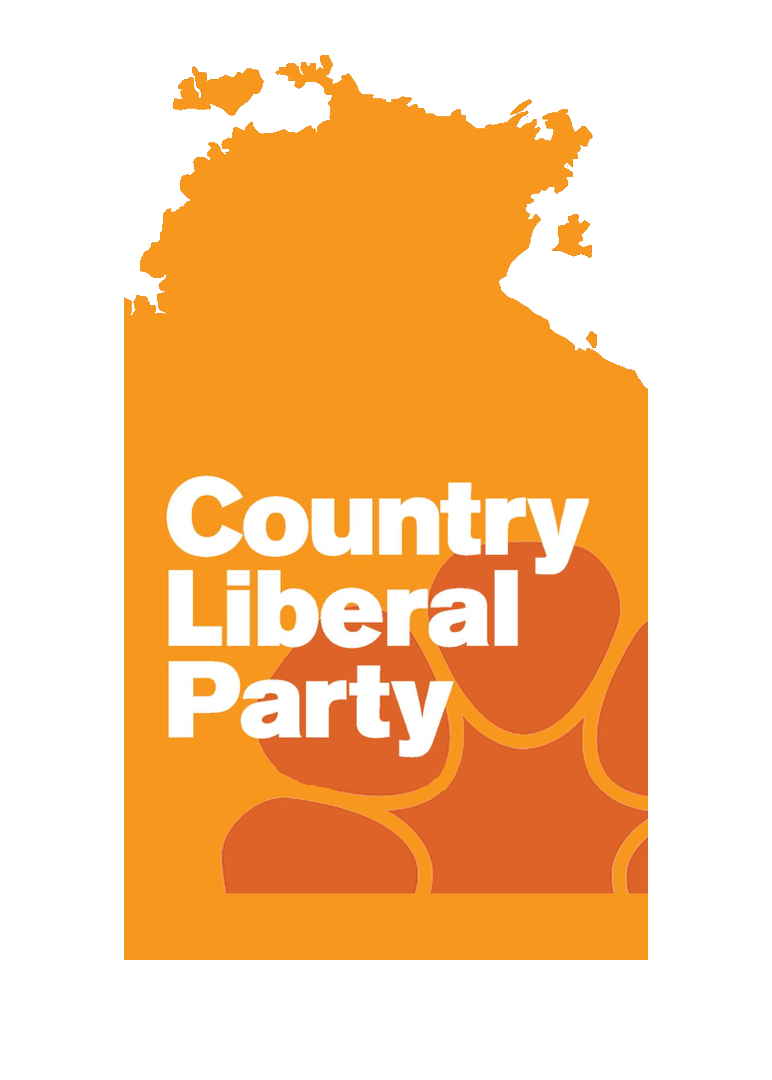
	First party	Second party
Candidate	Maurice Rioli	Bernard Tipiloura
Party	Labor	Country Liberal
Popular vote	1,448	684
Percentage	64.0%	30.2%
Swing	▼2.5pp	▼3.2pp
MP before election
Stan Tipiloura
Labor
Elected MP
Maurice Rioli
Labor

A by-election for the seat of Arafura in the Northern Territory Legislative Assembly was held on 7 November 1992. The by-election was triggered by the death of Labor (ALP) member Stan Tipiloura, who had held the seat since 1987.

The ALP selected Maurice Rioli, a former professional Australian Rules player, as its candidate. The CLP candidate was Bernard Tipiloura, with an independent candidacy of Colin Newton.

== Results ==
1992 Arafura by-election
Party	Candidate	Votes	%	±%
Labor	Maurice Rioli	1,448	64.0	−2.5
Country Liberal	Bernard Tipiloura	684	30.3	−3.2
Independent	Colin Newton	129	5.7	N/A
Total formal votes		2,261	90.3	−4.4
Informal votes		243	9.7	+4.4
Turnout		2,504	65.3	−2.5
Labor hold		Swing	N/A	

- Preferences were not distributed.
