= Thomas Cawley =

Irish writer and priest

Fr. Thomas Cawley (11 October 1878 – 6 May 1949) was an Irish priest, writer and playwright.

Born in Craughwell, County Galway, to Patrick Cawley and Julia Carr, he was ordained on 23 June 1907. In his student days he collected folklore, published in Iris Leabhar Manuat under the pen-name Killura (the old name of Craughwell). There is a strong belief in the Cawley family that he collected Raftery's poems and gave them to Douglas Hyde. He was involved in the Killeeneen Feis as secretary, and thus knew Lady Gregory, Edward Martyn, W. B. Yeats, and were jointly responsible for erecting a headstone over the grave of Raftery. The Cawley family of Craughwell possess an oil portrait of him. He was the granduncle of Rev. Martin Coen.

== Bibliography ==
- Máire Ní Eidhín a bilingual comedy, Dublin, M.H. Gill, 1905.
- An Irish Parish: its sunshine and shadow, Boston, Angel Guardian Press, 1911
- Leading Lights all, Connacht Tribune, Galway, 1913.
- Review of Leading Lights all in Connacht Tribune, 28 June 1913.
