= Martin Coen =

Irish historian

Rev. Martin Coen
- Born: October 6, 1933; Raheen House, Gort, County Galway, Ireland
- Died: December 2, 1997 (aged 64); County Galway, Ireland
- Resting place: Ballymore Cemetery, Craughwell, County Galway, Ireland
- Education: Kiltartan National School; St. Mary's College, Galway (1947–1952); Irish College in Rome
- Occupations: Priest, historian
- Notable work: The Wardenship of Galway, 1791–1831; The Irish College in Rome; History of St. Mary's College in Altra
- Relatives: Fr. Thomas Cawley (granduncle); Fr. Edward Holland, O.D.C. (great-granduncle)
- Ordained: 1958

Rev. Martin Coen was an Irish priest and historian (6 October 1933 – 2 December 1997).

Coen was a grandnephew of Fr. Thomas Cawley (1878–1949) and a great-grandnephew of Fr. Edward Holland, O.D.C. (1838–1918). Born at Raheen House, Gort, to Thomas Coen and Mary Holland, he was educated at Kiltartan national school and St. Mary's College, Galway (1947–52). He studied for the priesthood in the Irish College in Rome and was ordained in 1958.

Fr. Martin Coen died on 2 December 1997 and is buried in Ballymore Cemetery, Craughwell, Co. Galway.

== Select bibliography ==
- The Wardenship of Galway, 1791-1831, private circulation, 1967.
- Researcher for The Life of John Phillip Holland by R.N. Morris, Annapolis, 1966
- Dr. Edmund Ffrench, Galway, The Presentation Convent, n.d.
- The Mantle 1958-74, contributed forty articles.
- The Irish College in Rome, in Bethleham, Dublin, 1959.
- History of St. Mary's College in Altra, Galway, 1963.
