= Maurice Rioli =

Australian rules footballer and politician (1957–2010)

- Rioli in 1982

Personal information
- Full name: Maurice Joseph Rioli Tipakalippa
- Born: 1 September 1957; Melville Island, Northern Territory
- Died: 25 December 2010 (aged 53); Darwin, Northern Territory
- Original team: St Mary's (NTFL)
- Height: 176 cm (5 ft 9 in)
- Weight: 85 kg (13 st 5 lb; 187 lb)

Playing career^{1}
Years	Club	Games (Goals)
1975–81	South Fremantle	117 (95)
1982–87	Richmond	118 (80)
1988–90	South Fremantle	46 (34)
Total		281 (209)

Representative team honours
Years	Team	Games (Goals)
1978–88	Western Australia	14 (8)
1983	Indigenous All-Stars	1 (?)
1988	Northern Territory	3 (?)
Total		18

Coaching career^{3}
Years	Club	Games (W–L–D)
1994	Indigenous All-Stars	(1–0–0)
- ^{1} Playing statistics correct to the end of 1990.^{3} Coaching statistics correct as of 1994.

Career highlights
- Club: WAFL premiership: 1980; 2x Richmond best and fairest: 1982–1983; Norm Smith Medal: 1982; 2x Simpson Medal (for Grand Final): 1980–1981; VFL team of the year: 1983; Representative: National Football Carnival Championship (Div 1): 1979; National Football Carnival Championship (Div 2): 1988; 3x All-Australian team: 1983, 1986, 1988; Simpson Medal: 1983; Western Australia captain: 1987; Northern Territory captain: 1988; Australian Football Hall of Fame Inductee: 2016

Maurice Joseph Rioli Sr. (1 September 1957 – 25 December 2010) was an Australian rules footballer who represented St Mary's Football Club in the Northern Territory Football League (NTFL), South Fremantle in the West Australian Football League (WAFL) and Richmond in the Victorian Football League (VFL).

Acknowledged as one of the greatest players of his era, Rioli was among the first Indigenous Australian footballers to make a significant impact in Victorian football. He was named at centre in the Indigenous Team of the Century. Renowned for his exceptional ball-handling ability, quick reflexes, and skill, Rioli was regarded as one of the game's finest centremen.

After retiring from football, Rioli became a politician in the Northern Territory Legislative Assembly, and then worked in community services on the Tiwi Islands.

== Early days ==
=== Northern Territory ===
Born into the to-become famous Rioli footballing family on Melville Island off the coast of the Northern Territory, the young Rioli learnt the game at the Garden Point Orphanage on the island. He was educated at St John's College, Darwin. He joined St Mary's in the Darwin competition for the 1974–75 season; football in the top end is played during the summer months, or 'wet season'. Richard Woodgate a scout from the South Fremantle club in Perth spotted the sixteen-year-old and lured him to Western Australia to join his brother for the coming season. At this stage in his sporting life, Rioli was also an excellent amateur boxer, who some thought good enough to go to represent Australia at the Olympics. He later won state amateur titles at light middleweight and welterweight.

=== Western Australia ===
Rioli chose to sign on with South Fremantle as a professional footballer and quickly won a reputation as a brilliant, elusive centreman. During this era, Rioli was one of a number of brilliant Aboriginal players in the WAFL who caught the eyes of recruiting scouts from the VFL clubs in Victoria. South Fremantle, under ex-Richmond player Mal Brown, were a form team of the competition, playing in three consecutive WAFL grand finals between 1979 and 1981, including winning a premiership in 1980. Rioli won the Simpson Medal as best player afield in the 1980 and 1981 Grand Finals. Rioli was recruited by Richmond for the 1982 VFL season, after playing 116 premiership games and five pre-season/night series games for South Fremantle between 1975 and 1981.

== Impact in Victoria ==
To this point, few Aboriginal players had extended careers in the VFL. On his arrival in 1982, which coincided with the transfer of the Krakouer brothers to North Melbourne, Rioli spoke about the racial taunts and obstacles faced by Indigenous players in the game. Rioli chose to shrug much of the racism off, and he was certainly possessed with an intense concentration on the field. His reputation as a boxer probably helped to avoid confrontation during a game – Rioli was a scrupulously fair competitor who found no trouble with the umpires.

=== Richmond ===
Richmond awarded Rioli the number 17 made famous by Jack Dyer. Richmond supporters quickly warmed to their much-heralded recruit, who specialised in the audacious baulk, the pinpoint foot pass and the lightning-fast handball. His ability to work the ball out of packs and congestion was uncanny. Although his leg speed wasn't very fast, his quick mind appeared several steps ahead of the play and he had no problem adjusting to the faster tempo of Victorian football. It was just as well, because the Tigers opted to play him in his favoured centre position where Geoff Raines had dominated. For the previous five years, Raines had been the best player in the team (winning three best and fairest awards) and acknowledged as the best centreman in the competition, but he was moved to accommodate Rioli. The change worked well, and Richmond finished the season on top of the ladder for the first time since 1974. The Tigers booked a berth in the Grand Final with a comfortable win in the semi-final against arch-rivals Carlton.

Pitted once more against Carlton, Richmond went into the match as slight favourites. However, despite leading at half-time, the Tigers lost the match. Rioli created history by winning the Norm Smith Medal as best afield, the first Indigenous player and the first player from a losing team to do so; when combined with his consecutive Simpson Medals from the 1980 and 1981 WAFL Grand Finals, Rioli had been best on ground in three consecutive Grand Finals. Shortly after, Rioli won the Jack Dyer Medal as the club's best and fairest to cap off an impressive first season. But problems lay immediately ahead. Raines approached the club and requested a contract commensurate with Rioli's earnings. When refused, Raines walked out and asked for a clearance to Collingwood. Other prominent players fell into a financial dispute with the club and left.

Rapidly falling from the success of 1982, the decimated team struggled and finished third-last in 1983. Rioli, however, had another stellar season, again winning the best and fairest, finishing runner-up in the Brownlow medal, gaining Western Australian and All-Australian selection, and winning the Simpson Medal for his state of origin performance. An acknowledged star of the game and arguably the best player at the club, Rioli continued to stand out in a mediocre team. He represented Australia in Gaelic football against Ireland, and was an immediate choice for Western Australia in state of origin matches. However, after finishing second in the Richmond best and fairest in 1985, his days there soon looked set to end.

In the summer of 1985–86, the new private owner of the Sydney Swans, flamboyant and controversial doctor Geoff Edelsten, had been frantically signing talent on massive contracts to play for his team. Rioli was announced as one of his many signings. It was the salary cap that saved Rioli from leaving for Sydney. After rumours that he would either join Essendon or return to South Fremantle, he eventually returned to the Tigers midway through the 1986 season. Rioli performed patchily through the season and the next, when Richmond finished last for only the third time in its history. Rioli captained Western Australia in the state game that year against his teammate Dale Weightman, who led Victoria.

== Statistics ==
Legend
G	Goals	K	Kicks	D	Disposals	T	Tackles
B	Behinds	H	Handballs	M	Marks
#	Played in that season's premiership team

Season	Team	No.	Games	Totals							Averages (per game)							Votes
Season	Team	No.	Games	G	B	K	H	D	M	T	G	B	K	H	D	M	T	Votes
1982	Richmond	17	21	18	9	288	162	450	48	—N/a	0.9	0.4	13.7	7.7	21.4	2.3	—N/a	7
1983	Richmond	17	22	21	13	357	175	532	46	—N/a	1.0	0.6	16.2	8.0	24.2	2.1	—N/a	23
1984	Richmond	17	20	15	11	271	145	416	42	—N/a	0.8	0.6	13.6	7.3	20.8	2.1	—N/a	12
1985	Richmond	17	22	9	8	320	170	490	34	—N/a	0.4	0.4	14.5	7.7	22.3	1.5	—N/a	14
1986	Richmond	27	12	5	5	132	57	189	32	—N/a	0.4	0.4	11.0	4.8	15.8	2.7	—N/a	0
1987	Richmond	27	21	12	11	277	143	420	41	55	0.6	0.5	13.2	6.8	20.0	2.0	2.6	4
Career			118	80	57	1645	852	2497	243	55	0.7	0.5	13.9	7.2	21.2	2.1	2.6	60

== Honours and achievements ==
=== Playing honours ===
Team

- McClelland Trophy (Richmond): 1982
- WAFL premiership player (South Fremantle): 1980

Individual

- Norm Smith Medal: 1982
- 3× All-Australian team: 1983, 1986, 1988
- 2× Jack Dyer Medal: 1982, 1983
- Australian Football League Indigenous Team of the Century 1904-2003
- Northern Territory Team of the Century
- 3× Simpson Medal: 1980, 1981, 1983
- State of Origin (Western Australia): 1983, 1984, 1985, 1986, 1987 (c)
- State of Origin (Northern Territory): 1988 (c)
- Indigenous All-Stars team: 1983

=== Coaching honours ===
Individual

- Indigenous All-Stars team: 1994

== Return to South Fremantle and later career ==
Following the 1987 season, at 30 years of age and after 118 games with the Tigers, Rioli decided that his time in Melbourne was up and headed back to South Fremantle to be appointed as captain for the 1988 and 1989 seasons. In his absence, the football landscape in the west had altered dramatically with the formation of the West Coast Eagles. Rioli opted to play at the lower level, and the scheduling of seasons allowed him to captain-coach the Waratahs club in Darwin during the summer. He was still good enough to win All-Australian honours for a third time after the 1988 Bicentennial Carnival. Rioli played in the 1989 WAFL Grand Final, but South Fremantle went down to Claremont. In 1990, he finished as a player in Perth after 166 games for South Fremantle, but he continued as a player in Darwin until 1991. He followed that with a two-year stint as non-playing coach of the Waratahs. In 1993, he was invited by the AFL to present the Norm Smith medal at the Grand Final. Fittingly, it was won by another Territorian Aboriginal player, Michael Long (Essendon), who had played at St Mary's in Darwin, where Rioli had started his senior football a generation before.

== Post-career accolades ==
In 2004, Rioli was inducted into the WA Football Hall of Fame. In 2016, he was posthumously inducted into the Australian Football Hall of Fame. The grandstand of the Marrara Oval in Darwin has been named in his honour. In 2018, he was posthumously honoured with a Richmond life membership.

== Politics and community work ==
Northern Territory Legislative Assembly
Years	Term	Electoral division	Party
1992–1994	6th	Arafura	Labor
1994–1997	7th	Arafura	Labor
1997–2001	8th	Arafura	Labor

After permanently relocating with his family to Darwin, Rioli was elected as the member for Arafura in the Northern Territory Legislative Assembly for the Labor Party in 1992. He held this position until 2001 when he retired from parliament.

Although he played football for almost a decade in Perth and only six years in Melbourne, Rioli is still recognised as one of the most notable Northern Territorians. He was a trailblazer for indigenous Australian football players at the elite level of the game and was an acknowledged elder statesman among Aboriginal players.

After leaving politics, Rioli worked as a community services manager for the Tiwi Islands Council until his death, as well as spending his personal time mentoring young footballers.

== Family ==
The Rioli family is one of the most notable families in the history of Australian rules football. In 1972, Maurice's older brother Sebastian Rioli, became one of the first Aboriginal footballers from the Northern Territory to move to Western Australia to play football for South Fremantle. Maurice followed in 1975 and became the most successful footballer of the eight Rioli brothers. Brothers Cyril Jr and Willie also played league football for South Fremantle, and John, Manny and Laurence also moved to Fremantle, but returned to Darwin without playing senior football. Willie was drafted by Hawthorn in 1990, but did not make his AFL debut. Maurice is the uncle of former Hawthorn player Cyril Rioli (son of Cyril Jr), current Port Adelaide player Willie Rioli (son of Willie Sr), former Essendon player Dean Rioli (son of Sebastian) and great uncle to Richmond player Daniel Rioli. His son, Maurice Rioli Jr. was drafted by Richmond under the father–son rule in 2020 and made his debut in 2021.

== Death ==
On Christmas Day, 2010, Maurice Rioli collapsed and died at a family barbecue being held in Darwin after suffering a heart attack; he was 53. The Northern Territory Government announced a few days later that they would hold a state funeral for him.

=== Tributes ===
Upon the announcement of his death, tributes flowed in from around the country, in particular throughout the football world. Richmond chief executive Brendon Gale immediately extended condolences on behalf of Rioli's former club, saying:

Maurice was an enormously important figure in the game as a player, and more broadly in the leading role he played for Aboriginal Australians. He will be remembered as one of the greatest players in the Tigers' proud history.

Former teammate and club legend Dale Weightman stated:

Maurice was the cream of the crop. You couldn't tackle him, you couldn't touch him, but he was also a great tackler. He also did so much for Aboriginal players. He was always thinking about his people.

On behalf of the AFL, chief executive officer Andrew Demetriou said on Boxing Day:

... he was a wonderful skilled player who could control a game. He was the trailblazer for footballers from the Northern Territory in making their mark in the VFL and the AFL and he continued to serve his community long after his playing days, with his work in public life.

Former teammate and current leading AFL commentator Brian Taylor noted about Rioli's on-field skills that "He was absolutely electrifying ... He was just one of the greatest natural talents I have ever seen. He was the best tackler in his day and is still the best tackler I have ever seen." Richmond legend and Rioli's first coach at the Tigers, Francis Bourke, and former teammate and star player Geoff Raines, were amongst others to also pay tribute to Rioli in the days after his death.

=== Funerals ===
Rioli's state funeral was held at St Mary's Star of the Sea Cathedral in Darwin on 7 January 2011. The funeral was a Catholic service said by the Bishop of Darwin, Eugene Hurley, but hundreds of Aboriginal mourners also paid their respects through traditional "sorry business", with faces painted, clapping sticks, and wailing throughout the ceremony. Many football identities, including AFL coaching Legend and noted champion of Indigenous players Kevin Sheedy, attended the service.

A traditional funeral was held for Rioli at Garden Point on Melville Island on 10 January 2011, led by his 75-year-old father Cyril Rioli senior, and attended by hundreds of residents from the Tiwi Islands. Family members, including nephew and Hawthorn star Cyril Rioli, painted their bodies and danced and chanted their family's Dreaming story of the turtle to farewell Maurice. Cyril said that he remembered his uncle more for his work on the Tiwi Islands—including helping people with alcohol, drug, and other problems—rather than his exploits on the football field. Other clans danced their own Dreaming stories, and wailing men and women threw themselves on his coffin throughout the three-hour ceremony. Following the funeral proceedings, mourners carried Rioli's coffin to the cemetery, where he was buried near a mango tree.

Northern Territory Legislative Assembly
Preceded by Stan Tipiloura	Member for Arafura; 1992–2001	Succeeded by Marion Scrymgour
