= Riolo =

Riolo is a surname of Italian origin. It may refer to:

== People ==
- Alessandro Riolo (b. 1978), Italian footballer
- David Riolo (b. 1972), Australian former rugby league footballer
- Vince Riolo (b. 1947), Maltese philosopher
- Vincenzo Riolo (1772–1837), Italian painter

== Places ==
- Riolo Terme, an Italian municipality of the Province of Ravenna, Emilia-Romagna
- Riolos, a Greek village of West Achaea municipality, West Greece
- Pattiro Riolo, an Indonesian village in Sibulue district, Bone Regency, South Sulawesi

== See also ==
- Riol, a German municipality in Rhineland-Palatinate
- Riola, a Spanish municipality in Valencian Community
- Rioli, a surname
- Rio (disambiguation)
- Ríos (disambiguation)
