= Adrian Raftery (author) =

Australian author

Adrian Michael Raftery (born 30 October 1971 in Sydney) is an Australian author, journalist, businessman and lecturer. Raftery has written a number of tax reference books and has written finance columns for Woman's Day, Your Investment Property and Your Trading Edge magazines.

== Business career ==
Raftery runs a tax accountancy firm in Melbourne. Previously he ran an accountancy firm in Sydney which he sold to Stature Accounting in 2010. He is a Fellow of the Chartered Accountants Australia and New Zealand, the Institute of Public Accountants and FINSIA and is also a Chartered Tax Adviser.

== Academic career ==
Raftery spent a decade in academia. Following the sale of his Sydney firm, Raftery completed a PhD at the University of Technology, Sydney before moving to Melbourne where he was an associate professor at Deakin University. Raftery was the course director for financial planning and the inaugural director of Professional & Executive Education (Domestic) at the Deakin Business School where a number of his students won national financial planning awards. A LinkedIn post of his lecture where no students attended went viral in 2017. Raftery had a number of scholarly articles published in international and Australian academic journals including one which won the E Yetton Prize for the most outstanding paper published by The Australian Journal of Management during 2018.

== Personal life ==
Raftery married his wife Kylie in 2007 and they have a son (Hamish) and daughter (Zoe), who were both born via altruistic surrogacy. The couple had previously lost a daughter (Sophie) at birth.

== Charity work ==
Raftery is a board member of Bears of Hope Pregnancy & Infant Loss Inc, a non-profit organization which helps grieving parents following the loss of their child. He has raised in excess of $100,000 for the charity over the years including trekking Kokoda in 2017 and running the 2009 Sydney marathon to help raise funds for the charity to have their own Bear of Hope, which was subsequently named in honour of his daughter Sophie. In the process Adrian was the leading fundraiser for all runners in the marathon.

== Football career ==
After an extensive amateur career in the Sydney AFL competition with Holroyd-Parramatta Blacktown AFC Goannas, Raftery has acted as manager of AFL Sydney representative sides over the past few years. He represented the Australian Masters AFL in six International Rules Test matches against the Irish Masters GAA side between 2006 - 2009 in sides which included a number of former AFL players including John Platten, Shaun Smith and Ronnie Burns.

Raftery played in the 2009 E.J. Whitten Legends Game for the All-Stars as the Play in the Game winner at Ethihad Stadium and kicked a goal.

In 2021, Raftery will become the General Manager of AFL Masters National succeeding Neil King.

== Selective bibliography ==
- (2020) 101 Ways to Save Money on Your Tax - Legally! 2020-21 edition, Wrightbooks
- (2019) 101 Ways to Save Money on Your Tax - Legally! 2019-20 edition, Wrightbooks
- (2018) 101 Ways to Save Money on Your Tax - Legally! 2018-19 edition, Wrightbooks
- (2017) 101 Ways to Save Money on Your Tax - Legally! 2017-18 edition, Wrightbooks
- (2016) 101 Ways to Save Money on Your Tax - Legally! 2016-17 edition, Wrightbooks
- (2015) 101 Ways to Save Money on Your Tax - Legally! 2015-16 edition, Wrightbooks
- (2014) 101 Ways to Save Money on Your Tax - Legally! 2014-15 edition, Wrightbooks
- (2013) 101 Ways to Save Money on Your Tax - Legally! 2013-14 edition, Wrightbooks
- (2013) Fast Money: Save Money on Your Tax, Wrightbooks
- (2012) 101 Ways to Save Money on Your Tax - Legally! 2012-13 edition, Wrightbooks
- (2011) 101 Ways to Save Money on Your Tax - Legally!, Wrightbooks
