= Ronnie Burns (footballer) =

Australian rules footballer (born 1973)

Personal information
- Full name: Ronald Paul Burns
- Born: 13 March 1973 (age 53)
- Original team: St Mary's
- Draft: 49th overall, 1995; Geelong
- Height: 183 cm (6 ft 0 in)
- Weight: 86 kg (190 lb)
- Position: Forward

Playing career^{1}
Years	Club	Games (Goals)
1996–2002	Geelong	134 (239)
2003–2004	Adelaide	20 (23)
Total		154 (262)
- ^{1} Playing statistics correct to the end of 2004.

Career highlights
- 5× Geelong leading goalkicker: 1997–2001; West Perth Football Club premiership side 1995

Ronald Paul Burns (born 13 March 1973) is a former Indigenous Australian rules footballer for the Geelong Football Club and Adelaide Crows in the Australian Football League (AFL).

== Biography ==
Burns is the nephew of former footballers Tony and Benny Vigona. He was raised at Pirlangimpi on the Tiwi Islands. He was educated at St John's College, Darwin.

== Playing career ==
Originally from St Mary's Football Club of the Northern Territory Football League, Burns moved to Western Australia and played colts football for Claremont Football Club before moving back to Darwin. He was lured back to Perth by the West Perth Football Club before being drafted to the Geelong Cats in the AFL. Burns led the Cats in goalkicking five times, playing as a small crumbing forward during a less-decorated time for the club.

After a period of poor play, the Cats traded Burns to the Adelaide Crows for Ben Finnin, who ultimately did not play a game for the Cats. Burns played out the rest of his career with the Crows but failed to make the same impact as he had made for the Cats.

Burns played 154 games and kicked 262 goals from 1995 to 2004.
