= Pat Raftery =

Pat Raftery may refer to:

- Pat Raftery (footballer) (1925–1998), English former footballer
- Pat Raftery (camogie), former camogie player
