= Benny Vigona =

Australian rules footballer

Personal information
- Full name: Benedict John Vigona
- Born: 9 October 1958 (age 68)

Playing career
Years	Club	Games (Goals)
	St Mary's	75 (132)
1977–1986	South Fremantle	165 (220)

Representative team honours
Years	Team	Games (Goals)
1980–82	Western Australia	4 (1)
1985	Northern Territory	1 (0)

Career highlights
- WAFL premiership player - 1980; NTFL premiership player - 1977/78, 1983/84; NTFL Team of Two Decades (1974–94)

Benedict John "Benny" Vigona (born 9 October 1958) is a former Australian rules footballer best known for playing for South Fremantle in the West Australian Football League (WAFL).

== Biography ==
Vigona is from a large extended family who are heavily involved in Northern Territory football. His father, Anastasius, played for St Mary's in Darwin. His brother Tony spent time with South Melbourne in the Victorian Football League (VFL) without playing a league match before playing with St Mary's. A nephew, Ronnie Burns played in the Australian Football League (AFL) with Geelong and Adelaide.

== Playing career ==
Vigona made his league debut for South Fremantle in 1977. He was a member of the Bulldogs' 1980 premiership-winning team. He played his last match for South Fremantle in 1986 having played 165 matches.

During southern summers, Vigona returned to Darwin to play for St Mary's in the Northern Territory Football League (NTFL). He played in two premierships for the Saints during the 1977/78 and 1983/84 seasons. He was the Chaney Medallist for best player in the 1977/78 NTFL Grand Final.

He was the first player from the Northern Territory to become a life member of South Fremantle. In 1994 he was named in the NTFL Team of Two Decades for the period from 1974 to 1994. In 2009 was included in the Bulldogs' Indigenous Team of the Century.
