= Jake Long (Australian footballer) =

Australian rules footballer (born 1996)

Personal information
- Full name: Jake Long
- Born: 3 February 1996 (age 30)
- Original team: St Marys (NTFL)
- Draft: No. 47 (F/S), 2015 rookie draft
- Debut: Round 21, 2016, Essendon vs. Gold Coast, at Etihad Stadium
- Height: 185 cm (6 ft 1 in)
- Weight: 75 kg (165 lb)
- Position: Midfielder / Forward

Club information
- Current club: Essendon
- Number: 34

Playing career^{1}
| Years | Club | Games (Goals) |
| 2016-2019; | Essendon | 5 (1) |

Representative team honours
| Years | Team | Games (Goals) |
| 2015 | Indigenous All-Stars | 1 (0) |
- ^{1} Playing statistics correct to the end of 2017.

Jake Long (born 3 February 1996) is an Australian rules footballer who formerly played for the Essendon Football Club in the Australian Football League (AFL). He is the son of former Essendon player and Norm Smith Medallist, Michael Long. He was drafted by Essendon with their third selection and forty-seventh overall in the 2015 rookie draft. He made his debut in the six point win against Gold Coast in round 21, 2016 at Etihad Stadium. He was delisted by Essendon following the 2019 AFL season.
