= Pirlangimpi =

- Town
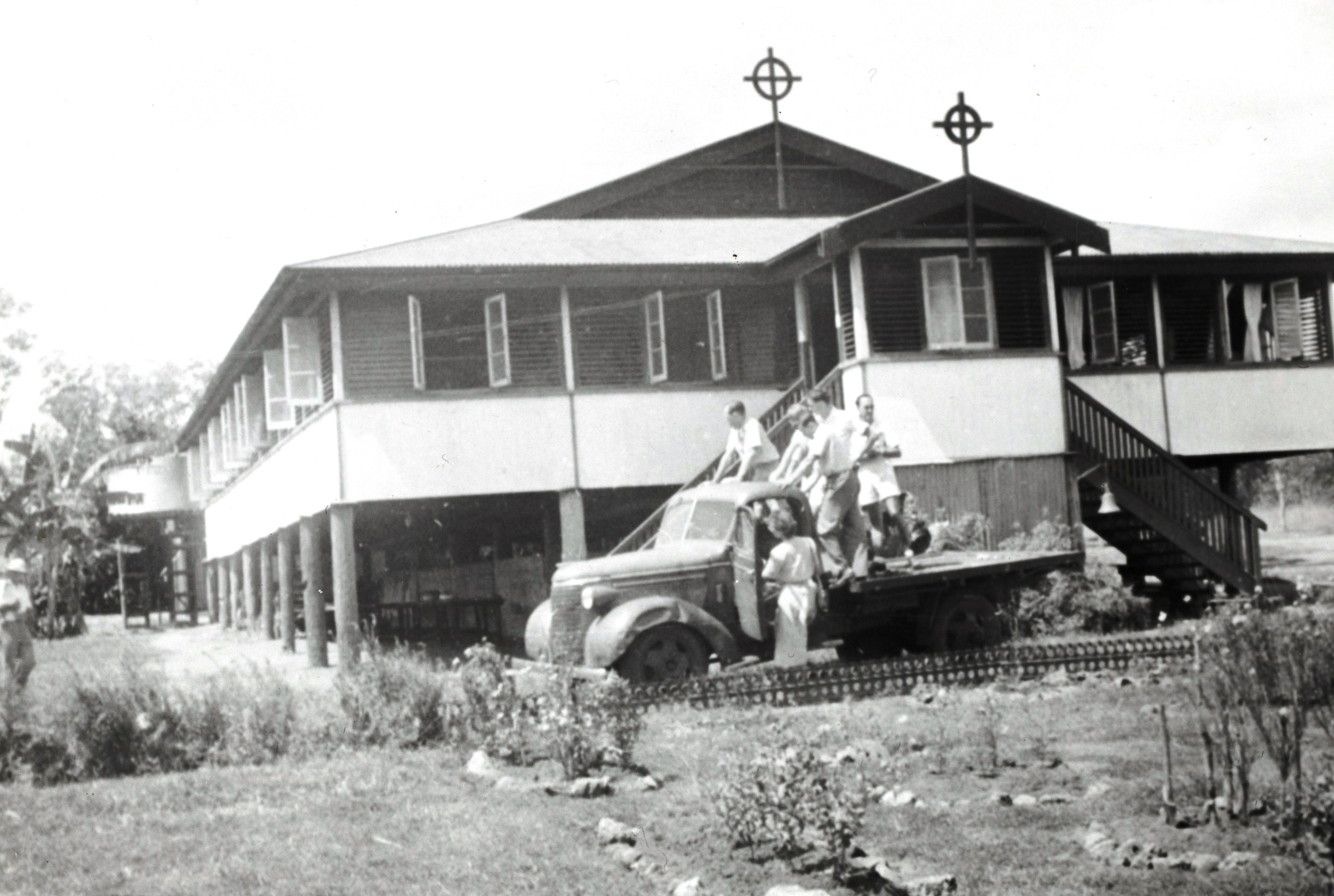
- Garden Point Mission

- Coordinates: 11°23′21.30″S 130°25′28.63″E
- Country: Australia
- State: Northern Territory
- LGA: Tiwi Islands Region
- Location: 3,257 km (2,024 mi) from Canberra

Government
  - Territory electorate: Arafura
  - Federal division: Lingiari
- Elevation: 22 m (72 ft)

Population
  - Total: 317 (SAL 2021)
- Time zone: UTC+9.5 (ACST)
- Postcode: 0822

Pirlangimpi, formerly Garden Point, is a populated place on Melville Island in the Northern Territory, Australia.

== History ==
Pirlangimpi lies 2 km (1.2 mi) from the site of the first British settlement in northern Australia, the short-lived Fort Dundas. The present settlement, then called Garden Point, was established in 1937 as a police post, because of concerns about the activities of Japanese luggers. Beginning in 1937, so-called "incorrigible natives" (Aboriginal people) were taken from their families and sent to Garden Point from Darwin to be supervised by a "Control Officer".

=== Garden Point Mission ===
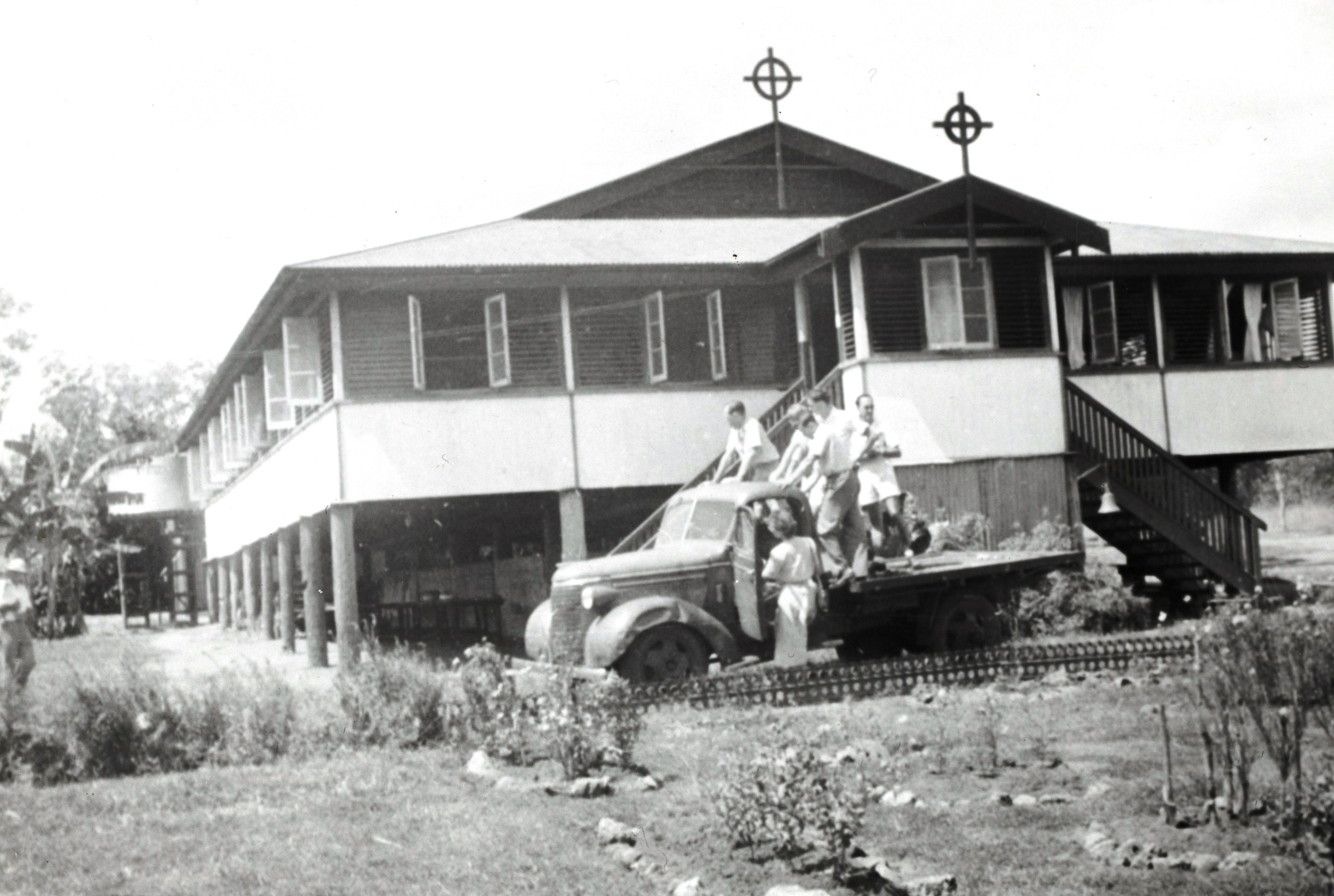
Garden Point Mission on Melville Island, NT

In 1939 the newly established Native Affairs Branch started negotiations with various missions to assume responsibility for those children considered to be "half-caste" (part-Aboriginal) currently in the government reserves at Kahlin Compound in Darwin and The Bungalow in Alice Springs. It was decided that a Catholic mission would be established at Garden Point for these children.

Garden Point Mission (aka Melville Island Mission, Our Lady of Victories Mission, Pirlangimpi and Catholic Mission Melville Island) was founded by the Missionaries of the Sacred Heart as a home for mixed-blood children, both local part-Japanese and those taken from their families in other parts of the Northern Territory. The Missionaries of the Sacred Heart looked after the boys and the Daughters of Our Lady of the Sacred Heart took care of the girls. Dormitories for boys and girls were completed by 1941, with the boys brought in first to help with the building work. There were 15 girls brought from the mainland, and another 14 transferred from the Bathurst Island Mission, all between 18 months and 14 years old. A school for children between 5 and 17 was established.

In 1942, after Darwin was bombed, 41 children (mostly girls) were evacuated to Carrieton, South Australia, being returned in 1945–6.

Children of Aboriginal people suffering from leprosy at East Arm and Channel Island Leprosariums were brought to the mission from the 1930s to the 1960s, and other children were despatched there by the Welfare Branch.

The mission lease was not renewed in 1967, leading to the closure of the mission school in 1968, with the last of the children taken back to the mainland in 1969.

Australian Rules football was introduced by Brother John Pye of the Catholic mission. Three Norm Smith Medalists – Maurice Rioli, Michael Long and Cyril Rioli – were raised at the mission at Pirlangimpi.

Marjorie Liddy, who grew up on the mission, provided an image that was widely used in Pope Benedict XVI's visit to World Youth Day 2008 in Sydney.

Garden Point Mission was mentioned in the Bringing Them Home Report (1997), the result of the National Inquiry into the Separation of Aboriginal and Torres Strait Islander Children from Their Families. Stories of sexual abuse of boys, and trauma suffered by the children as a result of being removed from their families, emerged later, and in November 2021 the Commonwealth Government and the two churches involved issued a formal apology to the people affected. A class action was settled privately.

== Facilities ==
As of 2016 the community includes the Pularumpi primary school, a police station, small supermarket, club, health facility and airstrip. Our Lady of Victories Catholic Church is the base of the Melville Island parish.

The population was 371 in 2016.

== Climate ==
Pirlangimpi has a tropical monsoon climate (Am) with hot temperatures present year round. There are three seasons. The dry season, the buildup, and the wet season. The wet season typically runs from the end of October through April, though rainy days can be experienced during the dry season and the buildup.

Pirlangimpi (Garden Point)

Climate chart (precipitation, max. and min. temperature)
J	F	M	A	M	J	J	A	S	O	N	D
516 26 23	354 27 23	364 25 22	106 28 21	74 27 20	4 28 19	1 29 18	1 31 19	13 32 21	52 32 22	140 27 23	224 28 23
- █ Average max. and min. temperatures in °C
- █ Precipitation totals in mm
Imperial conversion
J	F	M	A	M	J	J	A	S	O	N	D
20 79 73	14 81 73	14 77 72	4.2 82 70	2.9 81 68	0.2 82 66	0 84 64	0 88 66	0.5 90 70	2 90 72	5.5 81 73	8.8 82 73
- █ Average max. and min. temperatures in °F
- █ Precipitation totals in inches

Climate data for Pirlangimpi Airport
Month	Jan	Feb	Mar	Apr	May	Jun	Jul	Aug	Sep	Oct	Nov	Dec	Year
Record high °C (°F)	36.4 (97.5)	36.5 (97.7)	36.7 (98.1)	37.1 (98.8)	35.9 (96.6)	35.0 (95.0)	35.1 (95.2)	36.6 (97.9)	38.3 (100.9)	38.8 (101.8)	38.6 (101.5)	37.2 (99.0)	38.8 (101.8)
Mean daily maximum °C (°F)	32.1 (89.8)	32.0 (89.6)	32.4 (90.3)	33.0 (91.4)	32.8 (91.0)	31.6 (88.9)	31.6 (88.9)	32.5 (90.5)	33.7 (92.7)	34.1 (93.4)	34.0 (93.2)	33.2 (91.8)	32.8 (91.0)
Daily mean °C (°F)	28.4 (83.1)	28.3 (82.9)	28.2 (82.8)	28.1 (82.6)	27.1 (80.8)	25.3 (77.5)	25.0 (77.0)	25.8 (78.4)	27.5 (81.5)	28.6 (83.5)	29.1 (84.4)	29.0 (84.2)	27.5 (81.6)
Mean daily minimum °C (°F)	24.8 (76.6)	24.6 (76.3)	24.1 (75.4)	23.2 (73.8)	21.5 (70.7)	19.0 (66.2)	18.5 (65.3)	19.1 (66.4)	21.4 (70.5)	23.1 (73.6)	24.2 (75.6)	24.9 (76.8)	22.4 (72.3)
Record low °C (°F)	15.4 (59.7)	20.0 (68.0)	18.0 (64.4)	15.7 (60.3)	14.0 (57.2)	10.5 (50.9)	11.5 (52.7)	10.0 (50.0)	14.3 (57.7)	18.2 (64.8)	17.6 (63.7)	21.0 (69.8)	10.0 (50.0)
Average rainfall mm (inches)	414.2 (16.31)	374.8 (14.76)	331.9 (13.07)	192.0 (7.56)	22.7 (0.89)	0.9 (0.04)	1.8 (0.07)	3.2 (0.13)	22.2 (0.87)	79.0 (3.11)	182.2 (7.17)	361.2 (14.22)	1,986.1 (78.2)
Average rainy days	20.9	20.0	21.3	13.4	3.9	0.6	0.8	1.0	3.1	8.1	14.8	19.0	126.9
