= Cyril Rioli =

Australian rules footballer (born 1989)

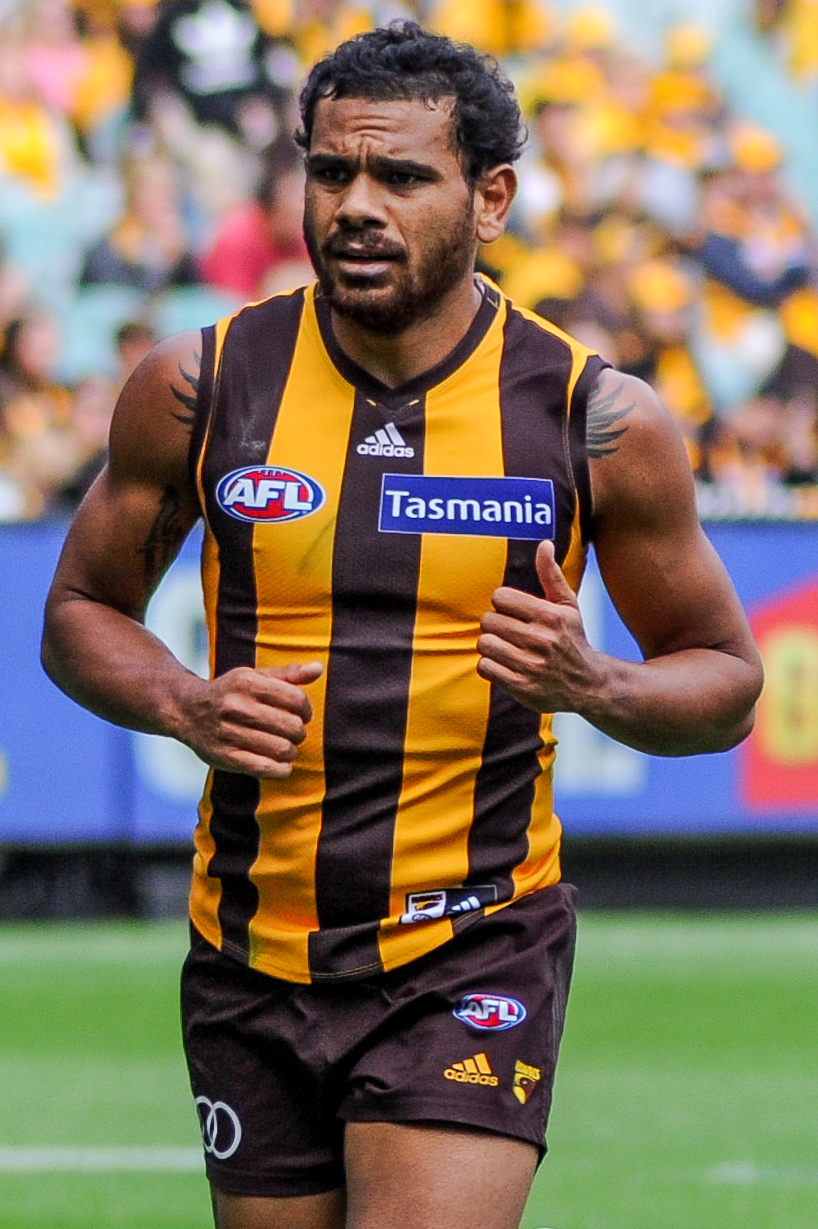
- Rioli playing for Hawthorn in April 2017

Personal information
- Full name: Cyril Rioli III
- Nickname: Junior
- Born: 14 July 1989 (age 37); Tiwi Islands, Australia
- Original team: St Mary's (NTFL)/Scotch College(APS)
- Draft: No. 12, 2007 national draft
- Debut: Round 1, 2008, Hawthorn vs. Melbourne, at Melbourne Cricket Ground
- Height: 177 cm (5 ft 10 in)
- Weight: 80 kg (176 lb)
- Position: Half forward flank

Playing career^{1}
Years	Club	Games (Goals)
2008–2018	Hawthorn	189 (275)

Representative team honours
Years	Team	Games (Goals)
2007–2009	Indigenous All-Stars	2 (1)
- ^{1} Playing statistics correct to the end of 2018.

Career highlights
- 4× AFL premiership player: 2008, 2013–2015; Norm Smith Medal: 2015; 3× All-Australian team: 2012, 2015, 2016; AFL Goal of the Year: 2009; AFLCA Best Young Player: 2009

Cyril Rioli III (born 14 July 1989) is a former Australian rules football player who played with the Hawthorn Football Club in the Australian Football League (AFL). Rioli was a member of four premiership teams and was the Norm Smith Medallist in the 2015 AFL Grand Final.

Primarily a forward pocket, Rioli also spent time in the midfield, although injuries limited his ability to spend long periods in the midfield. Rioli was noted for not being a particularly high-possession player, and instead using his few possessions efficiently.

== Early life and junior football ==
=== Family background ===
Born to Cyril Jr. and Kathy in 1989, Rioli comes from a bloodline of talented footballers. His father Cyril Jr. was a champion footballer in the Northern Territory and the brother of the late Richmond Norm Smith Medallist Maurice Rioli. Cyril Jr. played for Northern Territory Football League club St Mary's, where he won 12 premiership medallions and the 1995–96 Nichols Medal as the league's best and fairest player. His mother Kathy is the sister of Essendon two-time premiership player and 1993 Norm Smith Medallist Michael Long. Another former footballer, Dean Rioli, is his cousin. After the 2015 season his nephew Daniel was drafted to the Richmond Football Club. He has Chinese and English heritage from his maternal grandfather Jack Long.

=== Northern Territory lifestyle ===
He spent the first eight years of his life in the Tiwi Islands before moving with his family to Darwin in the Northern Territory.

=== Football scholarship ===
Rioli moved to Melbourne in 2004 as a 14-year-old, where he attended and boarded at Scotch College for four years while playing for the school's football team. The move came about after a decade-long relationship between the school and Indigenous communities of the Northern Territory. Dr. Rob Smith, a teacher at Scotch College, had expanded the school's four-week exchange program for talented Indigenous footballers into a full scholarship program, following numerous tours of the Tiwi Islands and specifically, Bathurst Island. Rioli was the first selected into the program. He originally made the trip alongside his cousin Steven, after just three days in Melbourne the two re-packed their bags with the intention of returning home. In an effort to retain the boys, Smith phoned Michael Long, who came out to the school with Derek Kickett and Sibby Rioli, another uncle. Long said he knew Cyril was making a life-defining choice at just 14; "That was the big moment, whether he'd tough it out or go". Steven returned home and Cyril persisted in Melbourne. Nicknamed "Junior" or "Junior Boy", he shone in his final season with Scotch College, despite suffering injuries throughout the season; including a broken collarbone and a severely damaged ankle. He developed somewhat of a cult following while playing for the school, following a video clip of his highlights being uploaded to YouTube. He has since stated that he believes the early move to school in Melbourne made the transition a lot easier.

Rioli was also a standout performer in the 2007 AFL national under 18 championships, becoming the only Northern Territorian to earn All-Australian honours, following a seven-goal performance in a match against Queensland. He was tipped to go high in the national draft, from anywhere between five and twenty-five. In this final year of junior football, he was one of five players, including Trent Cotchin, to be chronicled in the book The Draft: Inside the AFL's Search for Talent, by The Age journalist Emma Quayle.

Despite Rioli's speed, evasiveness and flashy tricks, the scouts at the AFL's draft camp were still to be convinced of his dedication, with his skin folds being described as "less than brilliant" and his commitment to AFL still being questionable. Prior to the draft, Rioli said "I have had a few clubs call me, and it's just confusing. I love playing footy, and I think I am pretty good at it, but it doesn't really matter where (I go in the draft)." He reportedly spoke to both the Kangaroos and the Adelaide Crows, before eventually being drafted by the Hawthorn Football Club in the 2007 AFL draft. The Hawks used their first-round draft pick and the number 12 pick overall to claim Rioli.

== AFL career (2008–2018) ==
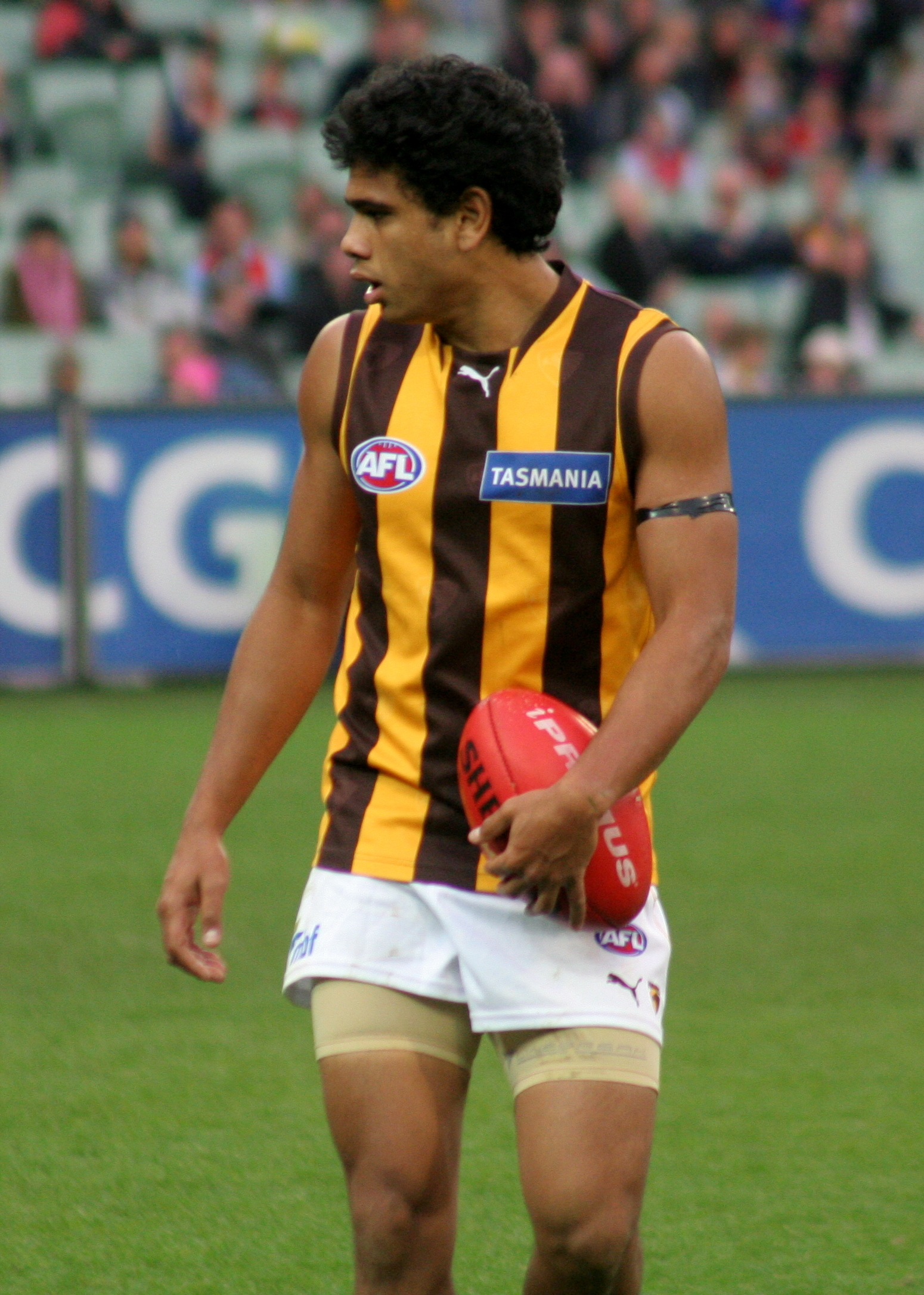
Rioli in May 2008

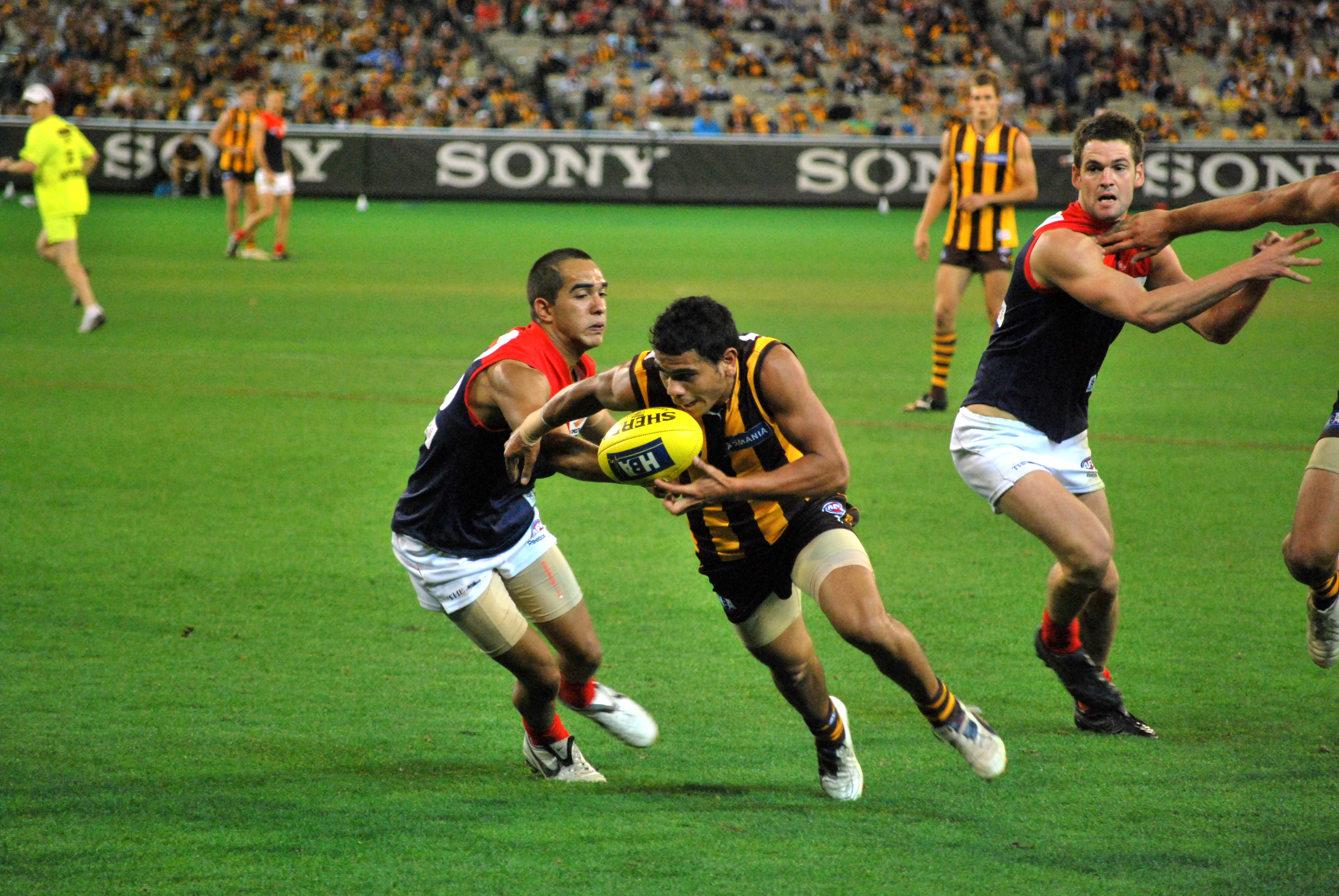
Rioli plays at the Melbourne Cricket Ground against Melbourne

Just a few days after being drafted by the Hawks, Rioli attended the club's trek of the Kokoda Track. He covered 90% of his first pre-season schedule for the club; a very high volume of work for a first-year player according to the head fitness coach Andrew Russell. Russell said, "Nobody that I worked with in the last four years at Hawthorn did that much in their first pre-season."

Rioli made his AFL debut in Hawthorn's defeat of the Melbourne Football Club at the Melbourne Cricket Ground (MCG) in round one 2008. He built a reputation around his ability to chase and pressure the opposition as they attempted to rebound from the forward line. In round six, he was nominated for the AFL Rising Star Award, after his display against Richmond, in which he received a nomination for Goal of the Year. Rioli appeared in every game in his debut season, including an inspirational performance in Hawthorn's defeat of Geelong in the 2008 AFL Grand Final. His impact on the game was described as instrumental as Hawthorn defeated Geelong, in the club's first premiership since 1991. Rioli assisted in a couple of first quarter goals and kicked two goals for himself in the final, achieving a total of 10 possessions in the game. After the game Hawthorn coach Alastair Clarkson said, "We knew Cyril was a beauty, but you just never anticipate that they're going to play every game of the season and be able to play in a grand final." With nothing but praise for Rioli, Clarkson also made mention of his achievements in 2008, "He's got a premiership medal now, but he's been in contention for mark of the year, goal of the year and the rising star and he's been very, very consistent. He's a 15-possession, five-tackle a game player with a goal or two – he's been a sensational acquisition to our club.

Rioli finished second overall in the 2008 AFL Rising Star Award, the award was won by Fremantle's Rhys Palmer with 44 votes, ahead of Rioli on 37.

In February 2009, Rioli was selected for the Indigenous All-Stars that played a pre-season match against the Adelaide Football Club. Following his successful debut season and promising start to his second, he was compared to Gary Ablett Jr., who also began his career as a small forward with the potential to become a "dominant, match-winning midfielder". This was due to the "sublime skills" he displays, and his "ability to make something out of nothing with vision and an instinct for the game." Former footballer and journalist Garry Lyon said in an article for The Age, that when Rioli is ready to take on a greater workload in the midfield, will be determined by his physical and aerobic capacity. Rioli's greatest challenge in the coming 12 months being to incorporate the "gut" running into his game that the likes of Ablett, Chris Judd, Lenny Hayes and Brett Kirk have mastered.

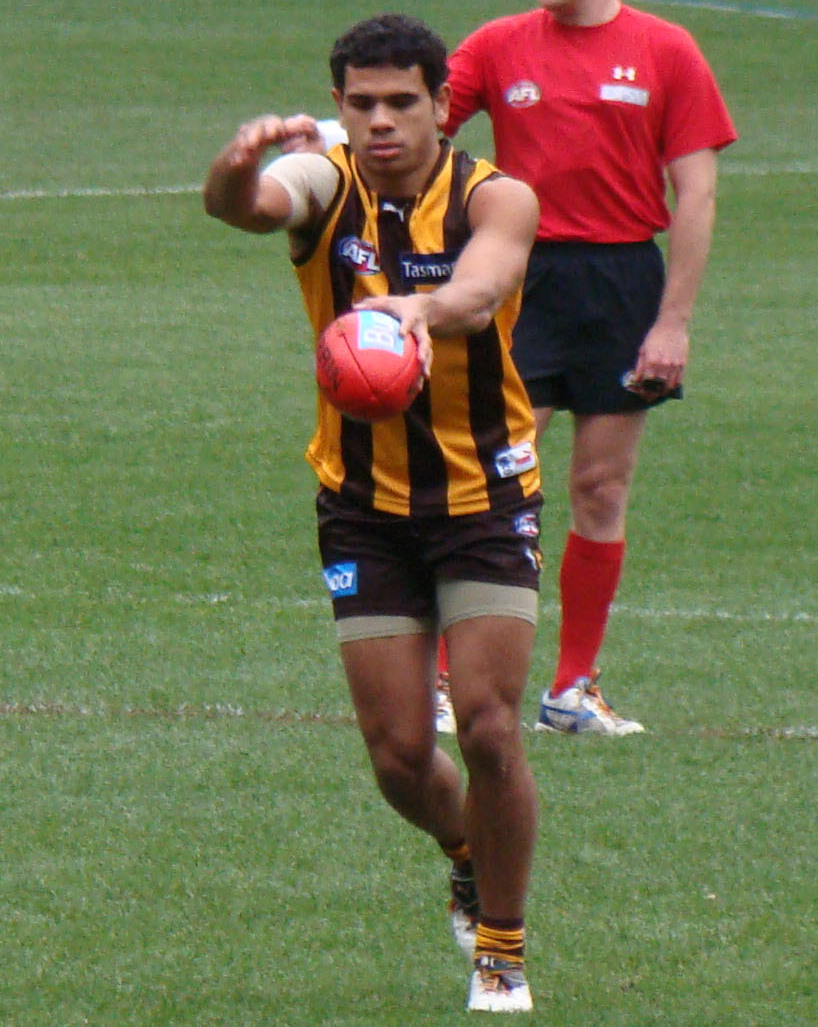
Rioli in 2011

In May, journalist Mike Sheahan proclaimed that Rioli's exploits on the field were being overlooked. He said while Hawthorn as a club was being analysed and dissected, Rioli wasn't getting the recognition he deserved. According to Champion Data, only captain Sam Mitchell had been more effective for Hawthorn at this time in the year. Following 36 consecutive games after being drafted, Rioli tore his hamstring in round 11 2009 against the Sydney Swans. Missing his first regular season match in round 12, he spent a month on the sidelines before returning against North Melbourne in round 15. The Hawks were defeated in all three games he missed. His return was described as a "big boost" for Hawthorn's last-ditch bid to revive its season, after many commentators said the club was suffering a "premiership hangover". Following his return, it was announced that Rioli had re-signed with Hawthorn for a further three years. Hawthorn eventually faltered in the final round of the home and away season, losing to Essendon by 17 points and therefore failing to qualify for the finals. Rioli's season was however, still seen as impressive. In the AFL website's end of year review, it was predicted that he will be considered an elite AFL player in the coming years.

Approaching the end of the 2009 season, Rioli bought his first apartment and declared his allegiance to spending his whole career with Hawthorn, he also revealed his intentions to help bring more players down from the Northern Territory: "That's the real goal for me, to get more kids drafted from the Northern Territory." After Hawthorn's demise in 2009, Rioli gave his support to a project which aims to teach Indigenous people in remote areas about the damage drugs and alcohol can do to the brain. An image of him is used in flip charts developed by the Menzies School of Health Research as an example of a person with a healthy brain. Sheree Cairney, the lead researcher at Menzies School, says there is a lack of knowledge in remote communities about how to treat drug and alcohol addiction, with the problem being "very, very widespread." At the end of 2009, he was awarded the AFL Coaches Association award for Best Young Player, covering his first two years in football. He also received the Phil Manassa Medal (Goal of the Year award) for his round seven effort against Essendon, and came second in the Peter Crimmins Medal behind the club's captain Sam Mitchell. When Rioli kicked the goal of the year, commentator Bruce McAvaney described him as a "delicious young footballer", and the description "delicious" has become strongly associated with both Rioli and McAvaney.

In 2014, Rioli had hamstring issues and missed most of the season, he was a surprise selection for the Grand Final.

In 2015, Rioli was part of the Hawthorn three-peat and capped of the year with a Norm Smith Medal. He dedicated the award to his cousin, Fabian Brock, who had been murdered during the 2015 season.

In 2017, he started the season slowly, then injured his right PCL while leaping for a mark against the Brisbane Lions in Launceston and that ended his season.

2018 would be his last season, he had an interrupted pre-season as Cyril asked for and was given leave to visit family in the Northern Territory, his father had been very ill. He returned to Melbourne and played the opening game. He was injured during a round 4 match against Melbourne , a Melbourne player clipped his leg and as a result injured his left PCL. Cyril again asked for and was given leave to visit family in the Northern Territory; while there, he took time to consider his future.

On 4 July 2018, Rioli announced his retirement from football, effective immediately, and that he would be moving back to Darwin to be with his family.

== Personal life ==
Rioli married his childhood sweetheart, Shannyn Ah Sam, on 19 October 2014 at the George Brown Darwin Botanic Gardens.

== Statistics ==
Legend
G	Goals	K	Kicks	D	Disposals	T	Tackles
B	Behinds	H	Handballs	M	Marks

Season	Team	No.	Games	Totals							Averages (per game)							Votes
Season	Team	No.	Games	G	B	K	H	D	M	T	G	B	K	H	D	M	T	Votes
2008^{#}	Hawthorn	33	25	24	19	200	145	345	98	87	1.0	0.8	8.0	5.8	13.8	3.9	3.5	2
2009	Hawthorn	33	19	21	21	168	129	297	74	89	1.1	1.1	8.8	6.8	15.6	3.9	4.7	2
2010	Hawthorn	33	20	27	10	203	143	346	81	98	1.4	0.5	10.2	7.2	17.3	4.1	4.9	6
2011	Hawthorn	33	19	29	16	190	117	307	78	93	1.5	0.8	10.0	6.2	16.2	4.1	4.9	7
2012	Hawthorn	33	23	39	22	218	142	360	77	121	1.7	1.0	9.5	6.2	15.7	3.3	5.3	6
2013^{#}	Hawthorn	33	15	19	14	136	89	225	51	63	1.3	0.9	9.1	5.9	15.0	3.4	4.2	5
2014^{#}	Hawthorn	33	12	20	8	112	72	184	49	45	1.7	0.7	9.3	6.0	15.3	4.1	3.8	1
2015^{#}	Hawthorn	33	24	42	23	234	134	368	103	104	1.8	1	9.8	5.6	15.3	4.3	4.3	7
2016	Hawthorn	33	21	47	13	196	92	288	77	128	2.2	0.6	9.3	4.4	13.7	3.7	6.1	8
2017	Hawthorn	33	7	5	7	56	31	87	21	22	0.7	1.0	8.0	4.4	12.4	3.0	3.1	0
2018	Hawthorn	33	4	2	2	23	16	39	4	10	0.5	0.5	5.8	4.0	9.8	1.0	2.5	0
Career			189	275	155	1736	1110	2846	713	860	1.5	0.8	9.2	5.9	15.1	3.8	4.6	44

== Honours and achievements ==
Team

- 4× AFL premiership player (Hawthorn): 2008, 2013, 2014, 2015

Individual

- Norm Smith Medal: 2015
- 3× All-Australian team: 2012, 2015, 2016
- AFLCA Best Young Player: 2009
- AFL Goal of the Year: 2009
- Hawthorn best first year player (debut season): 2008
- AFL Rising Star nominee: 2008
- Under 18 All-Australian team: 2007
- 2× Indigenous All-Stars: 2007, 2009
- Northern Territory Team of the Century
- Hawthorn life member
