= Dean Rioli =

Australian rules footballer, born 1978

Personal information
- Born: 20 May 1978 (age 48); Darwin, Northern Territory, Australia
- Original team: South Fremantle (WAFL)
- Debut: Round 3, 1999, Essendon vs. Sydney Swans, at the MCG
- Height: 180 cm (5 ft 11 in)
- Weight: 99 kg (218 lb)

Playing career^{1}
Years	Club	Games (Goals)
1999–2006	Essendon	100 (91)

Representative team honours
Years	Team	Games (Goals)
2003	Indigenous All-Stars	1 (0)
- ^{1} Playing statistics correct to the end of 2006.

Career highlights
- AFL Rising Star nominee: 1999; WAFL premiership: 1997

Dean Rioli (born 20 May 1978) is a former Australian rules football player who spent his whole professional career with the Essendon Football Club in the Australian Football League.

The nephew of Maurice Rioli, the Richmond Football Club champion of the 1980s, Rioli grew up on the Tiwi Islands in the Northern Territory, but was recruited from the South Fremantle Football Club in the 1998 Rookie Draft. He was a member of South Fremantle's 1997 Premiership winning team. His father, Sebastian Rioli, played for South in the 1970s, and his younger brother Shannon Rioli joined South in 2010.

== AFL career ==
He is renowned for his goal sense, silky skills and his ability to play well even when overweight and unfit. Rioli had ongoing injury problems (particularly back and knee-related) for many years, severely limiting his games played and the level of fitness he was able to attain.

During his final season in 2006, Rioli battled injury problems and only played four games. Dean Rioli played his last, and his 100th AFL game for the Essendon Football Club on 26 August 2006. He suffered a broken wrist during the game.

== Post-AFL career ==
Following his retirement, Rioli returned to the Northern Territory to play in the Northern Territory Football League with the Tiwi Bombers, where he became a solid contributor and on-field leader.

In October 2008 Rioli was appointed senior coach for 2009 at the Aberfeldie Football Club, in the Essendon District Football League. Prior to this he was an assistant coach, a role he also performed in 2006 at the Keilor Park Football Club. Rioli continued as senior coach at Aberfeldie in 2010 but stepped down at the end of the home and away season.

Rioli owns Bunji Hire which is a vehicle and equipment hire company across Australia. Bunji Bunji Hire supplies vehicles, trucks and buses to some of Australia’s largest major infrastructure projects.

Rioli ran the Dean Rioli Aboriginal Employment Services. Based in Essendon, a suburb of Melbourne, the company specialises in finding jobs for indigenous people.

In 2012, Rioli was the unsuccessful Australian Labor Party candidate for the Northern Territory seat of Arafura, the same seat that his uncle Maurice Rioli had held between 1992 and 2001.

Rioli was selected on the half-forward flank in South Fremantle's Indigenous Team of the Century in 2009, along with his father Sebastian and uncle Maurice.

In November 2022, Rioli was appointed to the Essendon Football Club board, filling the vacancy left by former club president Paul Brasher. Rioli became Essendon's first-ever Indigenous board member, and his selection aims to "enhance Essendon’s connections with Indigenous Australians across the country."
