= Snake Bay Airport =

- IATA: SNB; ICAO: YSNK

Summary
- Airport type: Public
- Operator: Tiwi Island Regional Council
- Serves: Melville Island, Australia
- Location: Milikapiti, Northern Territory
- Elevation AMSL: 173 ft / 53 m
- Coordinates: 11°25′22″S 130°39′13″E

Map
- Location in the Northern Territory

Runways
Direction	Length		Surface
Direction	m	ft	Surface
13/31	1,440	4,724	Asphalt
- Sources: Australian AIP and aerodrome chart

Snake Bay Airport (IATA: SNB, ICAO: YSNK) is located at Milikapiti, Northern Territory on the northern coast of Melville Island, Australia.

== History ==
=== World War II ===
The Royal Australian Air Force (RAAF) built the airfield as a forward fighter aerodrome, during World War II as part of the proposed strategic amphibious operations by Allied forces against the Tanimbar Islands and Kai Islands. It was proposed to accommodate a RAAF Fighter Wing and a United States Army Air Forces Fighter Group.

Construction was started on 7 July 1944, by No. 9 Mobile Works Unit RAAF with the help of 40 Aboriginal People. The airfield was operational on 30 August 1944. Two side by side runways 1,829 m (6,001 ft) long were constructed.

The airfield was never fully utilized as the proposed amphibious operations were canceled and replaced with the New Guinea campaign. The airfield was known as Austin Strip and RAAF Melville Island.

==== Units based at Austin Strip ====
- No. 6 Communications Unit RAAF
- No. 9 Mobile Works Unit RAAF

== Airlines and destinations ==
Airlines	Destinations
Air Ngukurr	Darwin
Fly Tiwi	Darwin, Pularumpi

== See also ==
- List of airports in the Northern Territory
