= Maningrida Airport =

Airport in Northern Territory, Australia

- IATA: MNG; ICAO: YMGD

Summary
- Airport type: Public
- Operator: Maningrida Council Inc.
- Serves: Maningrida, Northern Territory, Australia
- Elevation AMSL: 123 ft / 37 m
- Coordinates: 12°03′22″S 134°14′03″E

Map
- Location in the Northern Territory

Runways
Direction	Length		Surface
Direction	m	ft	Surface
14/32	1,530	5,020	Asphalt
- Sources: Australian AIP and aerodrome chart

Maningrida Airport (IATA: MNG, ICAO: YMGD) is an airport serving Maningrida, Northern Territory, Australia. It is operated by Maningrida Council Inc.

== Facilities ==
The airport is at an elevation of 123 ft (37 m) above sea level. It has one runway designated 14/32 with an asphalt surface measuring 1,530 m × 30 m (5,020 ft × 98 ft).

== Airlines and destinations ==
Airlines	Destinations
Airnorth	Darwin, Elcho Island, Milingimbi
Fly Tiwi	Darwin

== See also ==
- List of airports in the Northern Territory
