= Lake Evella Airport =

Airport in Northern Territory, Australia

- IATA: LEL; ICAO: YLEV

Summary
- Airport type: Public
- Operator: Gapuwiyak Community Inc.
- Location: Gapuwiyak, Northern Territory, Australia
- Elevation AMSL: 256 ft / 78 m
- Coordinates: 12°29′54″S 135°48′18″E

Map
- Location in the Northern Territory

Runways
Direction	Length		Surface
Direction	m	ft	Surface
08/26	1,065	3,494	Sealed
- Sources: AIP

Lake Evella Airport (IATA: LEL, ICAO: YLEV) is an airport in Gapuwiyak, Northern Territory, Australia. In 2004 the airstrip was sealed. The airport received $293,904 (equivalent to $435,426 in 2022) for security updates in 2006.

== Airlines and destinations ==
Airlines	Destinations
Fly Tiwi	Darwin
Marthakal Yolngu Airline	Gove
Mission Aviation Fellowship	Gove

== See also ==
- List of airports in the Northern Territory
