= Bathurst Island =

Bathurst Island may refer to:

- Bathurst Island (Northern Territory), Australia
  - Bathurst Island Airport
- Bathurst Island (Nunavut), Canada
