= Elcho Island Airport =

Airport in Northern Territory, Australia

- IATA: ELC; ICAO: YELD

Summary
- Airport type: Public
- Owner: Department of Infrastructure, Planning & Logistics
- Operator: Marthakal Yolngu Airline
- Elevation AMSL: 101 ft / 31 m
- Coordinates: 12°01′12″S 135°34′12″E

Maps
- Location in the Northern Territory
- Interactive map of Elcho Island Airport

Runways
| Direction | Length | | Surface |
| Direction | m | ft | Surface |
|---|---|---|---|
| 10/28 | 1,440 | 4,724 |
- Sources: Australian AIP and aerodrome chart

Elcho Island Airport (IATA: ELC, ICAO: YELD) is an airport on Elcho Island, Northern Territory, Australia.

== Airlines and destinations ==
| Airlines | Destinations |
|---|---|
| Airnorth | Darwin, Maningrida |
| Fly Tiwi | Darwin |
| Marthakal Yolngu Airlines | Gove |
| Mission Aviation Fellowship | Gove |
