= Goodenia potamica =

Scientific classification
- Kingdom: Plantae
- Clade: Tracheophytes
- Clade: Angiosperms
- Clade: Eudicots
- Clade: Asterids
- Order: Asterales
- Family: Goodeniaceae
- Genus: Goodenia
- Species: G. potamica

Binomial name
- Goodenia potamica Carolin

Species of plant

Goodenia potamica is a species of flowering plant in the family Goodeniaceae and is endemic to the Northern Territory. It is a prostrate to ascending herb with elliptic to oblong leaves on the stems and racemes of yellow flowers.

== Description ==
Goodenia potamica is a prostrate to ascending herb with stems up to 20 cm (7.9 in) long. The leaves on the stems are elliptic to oblong, mostly 10–30 mm (0.39–1.18 in) long and 5–8 mm (0.20–0.31 in) wide, sometimes with a large lobe on one side, near the base. The flowers are arranged in racemes up to 150 mm (5.9 in) long, each flower on a pedicel 10–15 mm (0.39–0.59 in) long with leaf-like bracts. The sepals are oblong, 1–1.5 mm (0.039–0.059 in) long, the petals yellow and 11–15 mm (0.43–0.59 in) long. The lower lobes of the corolla are 2.5–3 mm (0.098–0.118 in) long with wings 1–1.5 mm (0.039–0.059 in) wide. Flowering mainly occurs around June and the fruit is an elliptic to spherical capsule about 4 mm (0.16 in) long.

== Taxonomy and naming ==
Goodenia potamica was first formally described in 1990 Roger Charles Carolin in the journal Telopea from specimens collected by J. Must near the Liverpool River crossing in 1972. The specific epithet (potamica) means "pertaining to a river", referring to the habitat of this species.

== Distribution and habitat ==
This goodenia grows on river flats and in woodland in the Liverpool River area of the Northern Territory.

== Conservation status ==
Goodenia potamica is classified as "data deficient" under the Northern Territory Government Territory Parks and Wildlife Conservation Act 1976.
