= Milingimbi Airport =

Airport in Northern Territory, Australia

- IATA: MGT; ICAO: YMGB

Summary
- Airport type: Public
- Operator: Milingimbi Community Inc.
- Location: Milingimbi Island, Northern Territory, Australia
- Elevation AMSL: 53 ft / 16 m
- Coordinates: 12°05′40″S 134°53′37″E

Map
- Location in the Northern Territory

Runways
Direction	Length		Surface
Direction	m	ft	Surface
11/29	1,410	4,626	Asphalt
- Sources: Australian AIP and aerodrome chart

Milingimbi Airport (IATA: MGT, ICAO: YMGB) is an airport located 2 nautical miles (3.7 km; 2.3 mi) east northeast of Milingimbi on Milingimbi Island in the Northern Territory of Australia. The airport received funding for security upgrades in 2006.

== History ==
The airfield was constructed by Milingimbi Mission's Aboriginal residents on behalf of the Royal Australian Air Force during World War II.

=== Units based at Milingimbi Airfield during World War II ===
- No. 83 Squadron RAAF
- No. 457 Squadron RAAF

== Airlines and destinations ==
Airlines	Destinations
Airnorth	Darwin, Maningrida
Mission Aviation Fellowship	Darwin, Gove

== See also ==
- List of airports in the Northern Territory
