= SNB =

SNB may refer to:

- Beechcraft Model 18 aircraft, US Navy designation SNB-1 Kansan
- National Security Service (Uzbekistan), transliteration of Cyrillic initials СНБ
- San Bernardino Santa Fe Depot, Amtrak station code SNB
- Sbor národní bezpečnosti, national police in Czechoslovakia 1945-1991
- Service New Brunswick, a crown corporation in Canada
- Sunday Night Baseball, a live telecast of Major League Baseball games
- Sunday Night Basketball, a live telecast of National Basketball Association games
- Serie Nacional de Béisbol, Cuba's top-level baseball league
- Saudi National Bank, commercial bank in Saudi Arabia
- Swiss National Bank, the central bank of Switzerland
- Snake Bay Airport, IATA airport code "SNB"
