= Ramingining Airport =

- IATA: RAM; ICAO: YRNG

Summary
- Airport type: Public
- Operator: Ramingining Community Council Inc.
- Location: Ramingining
- Elevation AMSL: 206 ft / 63 m
- Coordinates: 12°21′24″S 134°53′54″E

Map
- Location in the Northern Territory

Runways
Direction	Length		Surface
Direction	m	ft	Surface
09/27	1,380	4,528	Sealed
- Sources: AIP

Ramingining Airport (IATA: RAM, ICAO: YRNG) is an airport located 2 nautical miles (3.7 km; 2.3 mi) southwest of Ramingining, Northern Territory, Australia. The airport received $32,965 in funds for security upgrades in 2005.

== Airlines and destinations ==
Airlines	Destinations
Fly Tiwi	Darwin
Mission Aviation Fellowship	Gove

== See also ==
- List of airports in the Northern Territory
