= McArthur River Mine Airport =

Airport in Northern Territory, Australia

- IATA: MCV; ICAO: YMHU

Summary
- Airport type: Private
- Operator: McArthur River Mining Pty Ltd
- Elevation AMSL: 136 ft / 41 m
- Coordinates: 16°26′42″S 136°04′30″E
- Website: atozairports.com

Map
- Location in the Northern Territory

Runways
Direction	Length		Surface
Direction	m	ft	Surface
06/24	2,500	8,202
- Sources: Australian AIP and aerodrome chart

McArthur River Mine Airport (IATA: MCV, ICAO: YMHU) is an airport 0.5 nautical miles (0.93 km; 0.58 mi) south of the McArthur River Mine townsite, Northern Territory, Australia.

== Airlines and destinations ==
Airlines	Destinations
Airnorth	Darwin

== See also ==
- List of airports in the Northern Territory
