= Groote Eylandt Airport =

- IATA: GTE; ICAO: YGTE

Summary
- Airport type: Public
- Operator: Groote Eylandt Mining Co.
- Serves: Groote Eylandt, Northern Territory, Australia
- Location: Angurugu
- Elevation AMSL: 53 ft (16 m)
- Coordinates: 13°58′30″S 136°27′36″E

Maps
- Location in the Northern Territory
- Interactive map of Groote Eylandt Airport

Runways
Direction	Length		Surface
Direction	m	ft	Surface
10/28	1,901	6,237	Asphalt
- Sources: Australian AIP and aerodrome chart

Groote Eylandt Airport (IATA: GTE, ICAO: YGTE) is an airport serving Groote Eylandt, an island in the Gulf of Carpentaria in Northern Territory, Australia. The airport is operated by the Groote Eylandt Mining Co. and is located north of the community of Angurugu.

== Facilities ==
The airport is at an elevation of 53 ft (16 m) above sea level. It has one runway designated 10/28 with an asphalt surface measuring 1,901 m × 30 m (6,237 ft × 98 ft).

== Airlines and destinations ==
Airlines	Destinations
Airnorth	Darwin, Gove
Alliance Airlines	Charter: Cairns

== Climate ==
There is a weather station at the airport. It suggests that Groote Eylandt has a tropical savanna climate (Köppen: Aw) with a wet season from November to April and a dry season from May to October. Extreme temperatures ranged from 40.7 °C (105.3 °F) on 6 December 2018 to 7.0 °C (44.6 °F) on 20 June 2004 and 21 July 2004. The wettest recorded day was 17 March 2024 with 431.0 mm (16.97 in) of rainfall.

Climate data for Groote Eylandt Airport (13.97°S 136.46°E) (14 m (46 ft) AMSL) (1999-2025)
Month	Jan	Feb	Mar	Apr	May	Jun	Jul	Aug	Sep	Oct	Nov	Dec	Year
Record high °C (°F)	38.8 (101.8)	38.7 (101.7)	38.6 (101.5)	36.1 (97.0)	34.8 (94.6)	33.0 (91.4)	33.0 (91.4)	34.1 (93.4)	36.7 (98.1)	39.1 (102.4)	40.0 (104.0)	40.7 (105.3)	40.7 (105.3)
Mean daily maximum °C (°F)	33.5 (92.3)	33.1 (91.6)	32.8 (91.0)	32.5 (90.5)	30.9 (87.6)	29.0 (84.2)	28.8 (83.8)	30.2 (86.4)	32.6 (90.7)	34.3 (93.7)	34.6 (94.3)	34.5 (94.1)	32.2 (90.0)
Mean daily minimum °C (°F)	25.4 (77.7)	25.1 (77.2)	24.1 (75.4)	22.1 (71.8)	19.5 (67.1)	17.2 (63.0)	15.8 (60.4)	15.4 (59.7)	18.1 (64.6)	21.2 (70.2)	23.7 (74.7)	25.1 (77.2)	21.1 (69.9)
Record low °C (°F)	21.0 (69.8)	18.8 (65.8)	17.0 (62.6)	13.7 (56.7)	10.6 (51.1)	7.0 (44.6)	7.0 (44.6)	7.7 (45.9)	8.4 (47.1)	11.8 (53.2)	16.0 (60.8)	18.5 (65.3)	7.0 (44.6)
Average precipitation mm (inches)	245.0 (9.65)	234.5 (9.23)	283.6 (11.17)	161.1 (6.34)	29.6 (1.17)	4.1 (0.16)	2.4 (0.09)	1.1 (0.04)	7.3 (0.29)	26.0 (1.02)	124.0 (4.88)	184.6 (7.27)	1,285 (50.59)
Average precipitation days (≥ 0.2 mm)	18.3	16.9	18.4	14.2	7.2	3.6	2.6	1.9	2.2	4.0	9.7	13.8	112.8
Average afternoon relative humidity (%)	68	69	70	65	56	57	51	46	49	50	56	62	58
Average dew point °C (°F)	24.1 (75.4)	24.2 (75.6)	23.5 (74.3)	22.3 (72.1)	19.2 (66.6)	17.6 (63.7)	15.7 (60.3)	15.1 (59.2)	17.4 (63.3)	19.6 (67.3)	21.5 (70.7)	23.1 (73.6)	20.3 (68.5)
Source: Bureau of Meteorology (1999-2025)

== See also ==
- List of airports in the Northern Territory
