= Syd Kyle-Little =

Australian Army officer and businessman

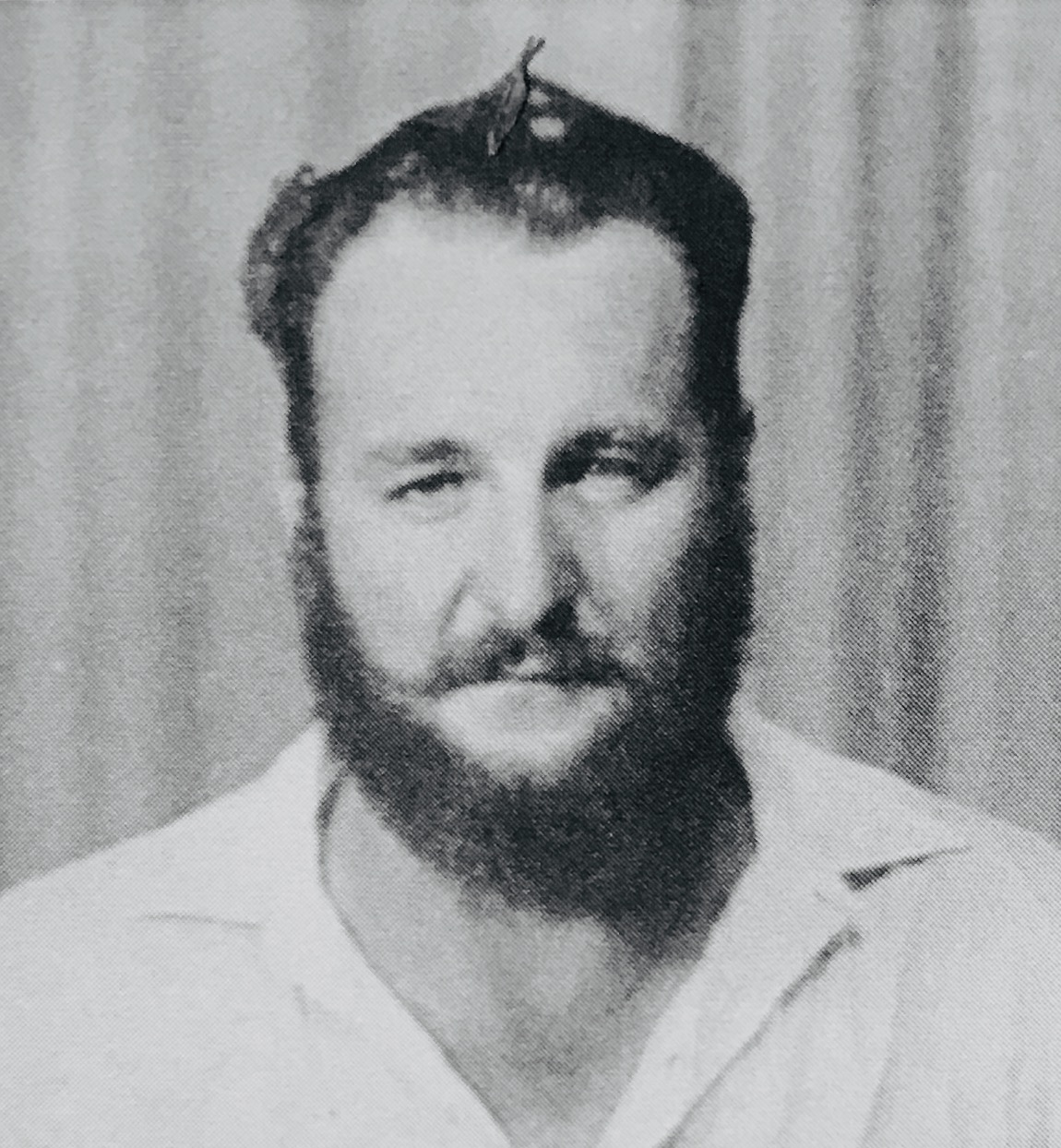
- Syd Kyle-Little on return from Patrol through Arnhem Land 1949
- Born: Sydney Hamilton Kyle-Little; 8 November 1918; Darwin, Northern Territory, Australia
- Died: 17 August 2012 (aged 93); Brisbane, Australia
- Burial place: Ashes scattered at Nadilmuk, Juda Point, Arnhem Land, Northern Territory
- Education: Sydney University
- Occupations: Soldier, Patrol Officer, Business Man
- Partner: Marianne Lila
- Children: Simon, Clinton, Scott, & Damien
- Parent: Arthur Sydney (Syd) Hamilton Kyle-Little Florence Kyle-Little nee Goodman

Sydney Hamilton Kyle-Little (8 November 1918 – 17 August 2012) was a soldier, Aboriginal Patrol Officer in the Northern Territory, Lieutenant Colonel during the Malayan Emergency and a businessman in Asia and Australia.

== Early life ==
Syd Kyle-Little was the first child born to Syd Kyle-Little and his wife Florence Kyle-Little, nee Goodman. The Kyle-Little family have Irish and military heritage.

His father worked for the Queensland Mounted Police before joining the Northern Territory Mounted Police. He served in Darwin, Katherine, Rankine River and Pine Creek police posts. Syd (senior) was renowned as a top horseman and skilled bushman. He worked closely with Aboriginal people and shared mutual respect with them.

The family in 1923 moved to Kedron, Brisbane, in Queensland, for the education of their four sons.

Syd (junior) had a lot of exposure to Aboriginal people, playing and tracking with Aboriginal children when very young and later when he visited his uncle who managed a cattle station at Humpty Doo, Northern Territory.

== Military service ==
In 1937 Kyle-Little joined the Darwin Mobile Force 1937 where he remained until the outbreak of World War II. He then became a member of the Australian Imperial Forces (AIF). He was in Darwin at the time of the Japanese bombing and also stationed at some of the mission stations across the top of the Northern Territory He attained the rank of Warrant Officer. In February 1944 Kyle-Little transferred to the Special Investigation Bureau and worked with the Americans traveling on their ships around New Guinea, Borneo, and New Britain.

He suffered a number of serious illnesses and injuries during the war. contracting malaria and dengue fever in Darwin. He also injured his hand while unloading ammunition at Woolloomooloo, and his back falling down a ladder on an American ship. During his later life he had recurring issues resulting from his war injuries.

While in a Military Hospital at Concord at the end of WWII Kyle-Little applied for the position of Cadet Patrol Officer for the Native Affairs Branch, of the Northern Territory Administration, an Australian Federal Government agency, in Darwin.

== The Native Affairs Branch ==
After the Second World War, in June 1946 Syd joined the Native Affairs Branch as a Cadet Patrol Officer. He was initially assigned to Arnhem Land, an area with almost total control of Aboriginal peoples and largely unexplored by Europeans. Aboriginal cultural and law practices predominated throughout the area except for the few mission stations around the periphery of Arnhem Land. While he patrolled in other areas of the Territory his focus was Arnhem Land.

There had been considerable disruption to tribal society during the war, and the lure of Darwin and access to tobacco and trade goods was strong. The people of Darwin also found the arrival of large numbers of Aboriginal people disruptive.

His main responsibility was the welfare of all Aboriginal people and upholding the law, Australian Law. His view was that their welfare was his primary responsibility.

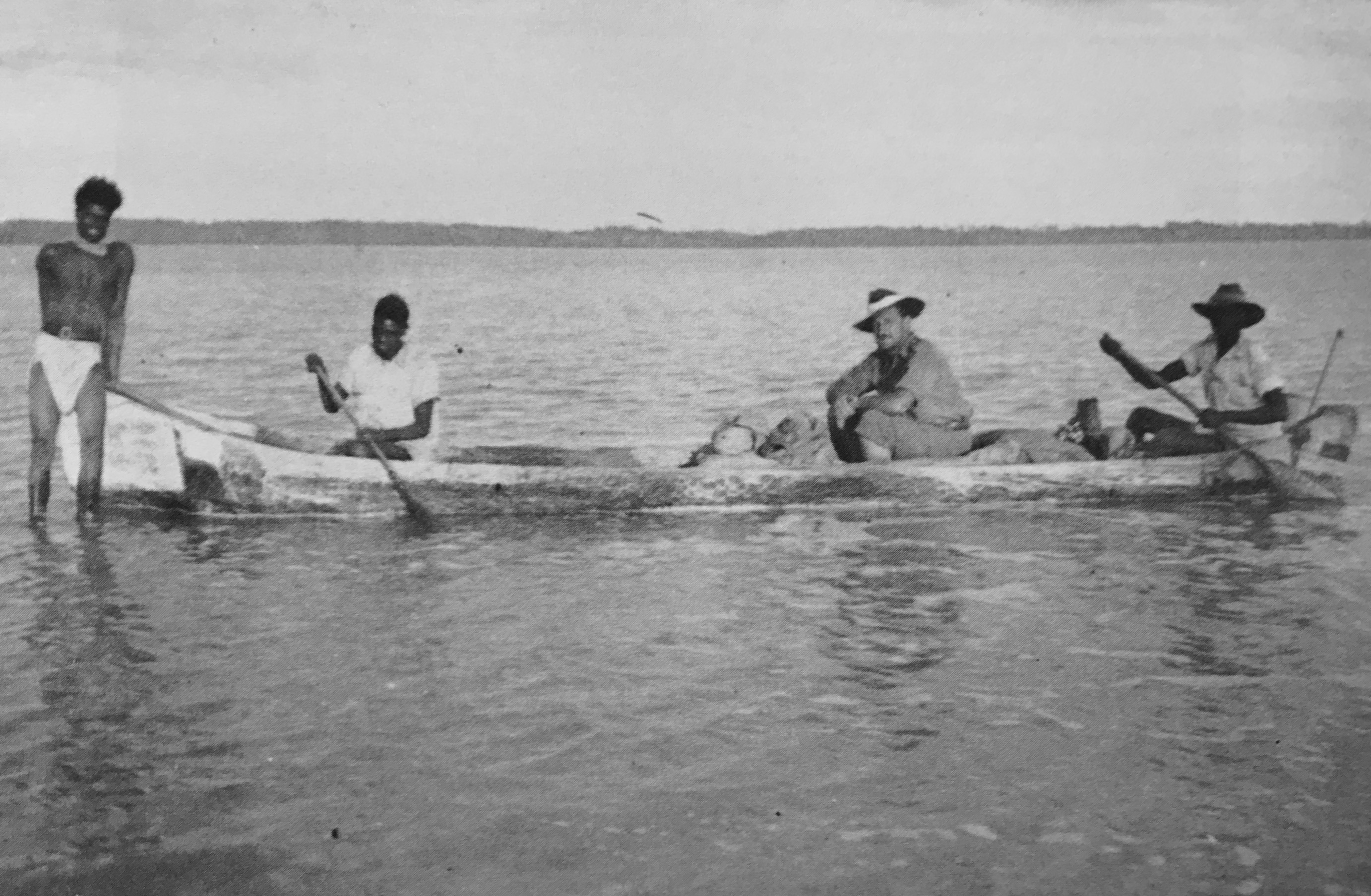
Syd Kyle-Little setting out from Milingimbi Island on his first patrol to the mainland of Arnhem Land in June 1946

There are three significant exploratory patrols undertaken by Kyle-Little through Arnhem Land using native canoes and on foot. These are:

- a sea and mostly land circuit from Milingimbi Island to Koepanger Creek, taking approximately a fortnight;
- a two month 480km (300 mile) trek from Milingimbi to Oenpelli (present-day Gunbalanya);
- a six week 320km (200 mile) joint trek with a police officer.

From a non-Indigenous point of view the Northern Territory has two seasons. A wet season typically from December to February and a dry season for the rest of the year. Each season has advantages and disadvantages for patrols. When traveling in the wet season patrols experienced flooding and inundation of large areas, heavy rains for long periods, high humidity and an increase in biting insects like mosquitoes. There are extensive areas of swamp that advance and ebb away between the wet and dry seasons. Patrolling in the dry season can mean easier walking on firm dry land, and the ability to cover greater distances more quickly, but there is the need to find fresh water for drinking. This can be found in billabongs and soaks known by Aboriginal people. Along the Arnhem Land coast are large tidal rivers with the tidal influence extending many kilometres inland that makes river water undrinkable. For example, the Blyth River estuary is 6km (3.8 miles) long surrounded by extensive swamps. Temperatures are almost always hot for traveling with the mean maximum day time annual temperature being over 30°C and the mean minimum night time temperature being 20°C.

The local Aboriginal Arnhem Land inhabitants have divided the year into four to six seasons depending on the part of Arnhem Land and the different wind and weather experienced. These seasons could be further subdivided based on availability and behaviour of plants and animals. Kyle-Little always travelled with a small group of Aboriginal people with intimate knowledge of the seasons and food and water availability. Late in 1946, he met two Aboriginal men, Oondabund and his brother, Narlebar who were linguistically fluent in seven of the local languages, had good English and were proficient hunters and trackers. They eventually were appointed as his assistants (as Aboriginal trackers) and became his good friends. Aboriginal people who assisted on the patrols were typically paid with tobacco, although his assistants received a small stipend.

For Arnhem Land patrols, initial transport from Darwin was typically by lugger and occasionally an aircraft to a drop-off point and then using native canoes, travelling on foot and at times swimming rivers. Kyle-Little took a 303 rifle and ammunition, a large knife, a swag of canvas, blankets and a mosquito net, a set of spare clothes, toothbrush, compass, diary and multiple cakes of soap. He obtained food and water from the land using his skills and those of his Aboriginal companions.

The main dangers were from crocodiles in and near water and buffalo in the bush.

=== Sydney University ===
After completion of his 18-month probationary period, Kyle-Little and two other cadets were sent to the University of Sydney for a six-month course in Anthropology, Criminal Law and Tropical Medicine. His companion Patrol Officers were Ted Evans and Les Penhall. They were the first Patrol Officers to take such a course.

On his return he went on patrol to Borroloola.

=== Aboriginal Trading Post ===
With the support of the Native Affairs Branch Kyle-Little with another Patrol Officer, Jack Doolan planned to set up trading posts in 1949 for Aboriginal people in their own country. The intention was to enable the Indigenous people to keep their links with country, trade and thereby obtain the things they needed. The first and only one set up was at the site of current day Maningrida.

To achieve this they repaired an old auxiliary cutter, the Amity, which they restored at Doctors Gully, Darwin, and then used it to carry crocodile skins, woven baskets and trepang to Darwin for resale.

In 1981 he went to visit Maningrida with the rest of the Kyle-Little family to visit their son Simon, who was an Aboriginal adviser at Maningrida. While there, his family met the families of his tracker assistants from Patrol Officer days, Oondabunda and Narleba.

=== Travel ===
After a change in the administration of the Native Affairs Branch that did not share his view on establishing an Aboriginal enterprise, in 1950 Kyle-Little decided on a long holiday. He initially went to the UK and Ireland and a planned trip to South America.

While in London he gave a lecture to the Royal Anthropological Institute of Great Britain and Ireland. On the subject of "The Aboriginal Tribes of Arnhem Land".

He then went to Ireland to stay with two great aunts in Stewarts Town, the family seat. While there he received an invitation from the British Colonial Service to attend and be interviewed for a position as a Resettlement Officer in Malaya during the Emergency.

On return to Darwin in early 1950 he resigned his position as Patrol Officer to take up the position of Resettlement Officer in British Malaya.

== Malay emergency ==
Kyle-Little's role as a Resettlement Officer was for the British Colonial Service and it had close ties with the British military and the Malay police.

The first major task was the creation of a secure compound village of Kebun Bahru, New Garden, Tangkak District, Johor, Malaysia. Surrounded by triple apron barbed wire, with a fortified police post at the centre. Relocated villagers were provided with initial financial support for 6 months and a plot of land to cultivate.

In 1952 he was seconded to the British commanded Malayan Security Forces holding the rank of Lieutenant Colonel in their Home Guard. He had responsibility for the defence of all villages (kampongs) and towns in the State of Negri Sembian. His headquarters were in the state capital, Seremban.

In his book The War that was called "An Emergency", Kyle-Little describes the war as a dirty war with the Malay Communist Party. He used his wartime jungle experience and the tracking skills he gained as a patrol officer. He had contact with the Australian Forces participating in the Emergency and some part in the recruitment of officers for the Home Guard.

As the Emergency was winding down and Kyle-Little planned to marry he went on leave in December 1955. His military engagement ended on 7 April 1956.

== Business ==
In 1957 Kyle-Little went to Singapore with his new wife and joined the corporate world, as a Manager for Wyeth International, a US pharmaceutical company. Before taking up the post, he attended training in Manila where his first son was born and then went to live in Bangkok, Thailand as manager.

In 1968 the family returned to Australia to raise and educate their sons.

== Awards ==
Kyle-Little was awarded the Distinguished Conduct Medal (Negeri Sembilan, Malaya) for his:

- work planning and executing several of the largest new villages;
- night rescue of a mother and her baby in a flooded and swiftly flowing river.

== Books ==
- Whispering Wind — Adventures in Arnhem Land, 1957, updated 1993, republished as a revised edition in 2014, paperback.
- The War That Was Called "An Emergency": Malaya 1951–1956, paperback – 1 Jan 2016, published posthumously.
