= Maningrida, Northern Territory =

Maningrida Manayingkarírra (Djeebbana) Manawukan (Gunwinggu)
- Town
- Coordinates: 12°03′S 134°13′E
- Country: Australia
- State: Northern Territory
- Region: Arnhem Land
- LGA: West Arnhem Regional Council
- Location: 500 km (310 mi) east of Darwin; 300 km (190 mi) northeast of Jabiru

Government
  - Territory electorate: Arafura
  - Federal division: Lingiari
- Elevation: 28 m (92 ft)

Population
  - Total: 2,518 (SAL 2021)
- Time zone: UTC+9:30 (ACST)
- Mean max temp: 32.3 °C (90.1 °F)
- Mean min temp: 22.5 °C (72.5 °F)
- Annual rainfall: 1,209.9 mm (47.63 in)

Maningrida (Ndjébanna: Manayingkarírra, Kuninjku: Manawukan) is an Aboriginal community in the Arnhem Land region of Australia's Northern Territory. Maningrida is 500 km (311 mi) east of Darwin, and 300 km (186 mi) north east of Jabiru. It is on the North Central Arnhem Land coast of the Arafura Sea, on the estuary of the Liverpool River.

The Kunibídji (Ndjebbana) people are the traditional owners of this country. Major players in the town's economic and political life include the West Arnhem Regional Council, the Bawinanga Homelands Aboriginal Corporation, the Maningrida Progress Association, and Mala'la Health Service Aboriginal Corporation. Maningrida Arts & Culture, with its Djómi Museum, managed by the Bawinanga Homelands Aboriginal Corporation, is a major art centre, known both nationally and internationally.

At the 2021 census, Maningrida had a population of 2,518.

== History ==
=== Traditional Owners ===
The Kunibídji (Ndjebbana) people are the traditional owners of this country. The name Maningrida is an Anglicised version of the Kunibídji name Manayingkarírra, which comes from the phrase Mane djang karirra, meaning "the place where the Dreaming changed shape". It is also known as Manawukan, the name assigned to it by the neighbouring Kuninjku people, which refers to a wetland area north-east of Maningrida.

=== Establishment of the settlement ===
The township of Maningrida dates back to just after World War 2. Syd Kyle-Little, working for the newly-formed Native Affairs Department, came up with the plan of a trading post to create a self-sufficient Aboriginal community, to stop the drift of Aboriginal people leaving their homelands and moving to Darwin. The intention was to make Maningrida self-sufficient and independent of welfare support. Jack Doolan became Kyle-Little's cadet patrol officer, and together they made the first white contact with the Aboriginal peoples since a hostile encounter with Matthew Flinders on his circumnavigation of Australia. Kyle-Little had intended to open other trading posts to serve other peoples on their own lands, but with a change in administration of the NT in 1950, the trading post was closed, and Kyle-Little resigned in disgust.

=== Government settlement area ===
David and Ingrid Drysdale, former missionaries, established a new settlement in 1957. Maningrida became the first government-sponsored settlement, as opposed to a mission settlement, in Arnhem Land. An airstrip, school and hospital were built, and people from far and wide drifted in to live at the settlement. The government's motive was partly to quell the post-war migration of Aboriginal people from the Blyth and Liverpool Rivers regions into Darwin. Patrols went out to spread the word and encourage people to move into the settlement. Within a few years, the population had grown rapidly and the demographics of the area changed. This exacerbated traditionally strained relationships, and further tensions were created by the growing population of non-Indigenous people, known as Balanda, who were able to get jobs and decent housing. The number of Balanda grew from about 40 to 250 people between 1970 and 1974. The Aboriginal Land Rights (Northern Territory) Act 1976 gave Maningrida and other Aboriginal communities independence and self-government; however, Balanda still held most of the skilled and highly paid service positions.

=== Outstation movement ===
From the 1960s onwards, the outstation movement led to many people returning to live on their traditional lands, which led to the establishment of the Bawinaga Aboriginal Corporation in 1970 (see below).

=== Cyclone Monica ===
On the night of 24 April 2006 Cyclone Monica, the most severe cyclone ever to strike Australia at the time (later tied with Cyclone Marcus in 2018), passed just to the west of the community. The community was spared the full brute force of the category 5 cyclone and infrastructure damage was only light to moderate, despite a reported wind gust of 148 km/h at the town.

=== Contemporary ===
In 2015, the town became the subject of international news when it was incorrectly reported that "more than 25,000 venomous spiders suddenly descended upon [the town]". The confusion stemmed from a new article documenting a floodplain near the town with an extremely high concentration of tarantulas.

== Geography ==
=== Location ===
Maningrida is 500 km (311 mi) east of Darwin, and 300 km (186 mi) north east of Jabiru. It is on the North Central Arnhem Land coast of the Arafura Sea, on the estuary of the Liverpool River.

=== Important Bird Area ===
Close to Maningrida is Haul Round Island, which has been identified as an Important Bird Area because of its seabird breeding colony - one of the largest in the Northern Territory. The seabird eggs, mainly those of roseate and bridled terns, are often harvested as a food resource.

=== Climate ===
Maningrida has a tropical savanna climate (Köppen: Aw). It experiences a short wet season from December to April and a long dry season from May to November.

Temperature & precipitation data are currently recorded at the airport weather station, which opened in 2003.

Climate data for Maningrida Airport (12.06°S 134.23°E, 28 m (92 ft) m AMSL) (2003-2025 data)
Month	Jan	Feb	Mar	Apr	May	Jun	Jul	Aug	Sep	Oct	Nov	Dec	Year
Record high °C (°F)	36.9 (98.4)	36.8 (98.2)	38.5 (101.3)	36.2 (97.2)	35.1 (95.2)	34.7 (94.5)	34.3 (93.7)	35.4 (95.7)	37.7 (99.9)	38.2 (100.8)	37.9 (100.2)	38.5 (101.3)	38.5 (101.3)
Mean daily maximum °C (°F)	32.5 (90.5)	32.3 (90.1)	32.2 (90.0)	32.5 (90.5)	32.1 (89.8)	30.9 (87.6)	30.8 (87.4)	31.5 (88.7)	32.4 (90.3)	33.3 (91.9)	34.0 (93.2)	33.5 (92.3)	32.3 (90.2)
Mean daily minimum °C (°F)	25.2 (77.4)	24.9 (76.8)	24.6 (76.3)	23.5 (74.3)	21.9 (71.4)	19.6 (67.3)	18.4 (65.1)	18.2 (64.8)	20.5 (68.9)	23.1 (73.6)	24.9 (76.8)	25.4 (77.7)	22.5 (72.5)
Record low °C (°F)	21.6 (70.9)	21.5 (70.7)	18.9 (66.0)	17.4 (63.3)	14.4 (57.9)	8.8 (47.8)	9.6 (49.3)	11.3 (52.3)	13.1 (55.6)	16.9 (62.4)	20.6 (69.1)	21.2 (70.2)	8.8 (47.8)
Average precipitation mm (inches)	275.2 (10.83)	257.7 (10.15)	284.7 (11.21)	137.7 (5.42)	21.8 (0.86)	3.2 (0.13)	0.7 (0.03)	1.7 (0.07)	7.3 (0.29)	11.1 (0.44)	43.6 (1.72)	175.3 (6.90)	1,209.9 (47.63)
Average precipitation days (≥ 1.0 mm)	16.6	14.3	14.1	10.1	2.9	0.5	0.1	0.3	0.5	1.2	3.8	10.0	74.4
Source: Bureau of Meteorology (2003-2025 data)

Temperature, precipitation & 3 pm observations were formerly recorded at the Maningrida weather station from 1958 to 2008.

Climate data for Maningrida (12.05°S 134.23°E, 11 m (36 ft) m AMSL) (1958-2008 data)
Month	Jan	Feb	Mar	Apr	May	Jun	Jul	Aug	Sep	Oct	Nov	Dec	Year
Record high °C (°F)	37.0 (98.6)	37.6 (99.7)	37.2 (99.0)	36.0 (96.8)	35.4 (95.7)	34.0 (93.2)	34.0 (93.2)	35.7 (96.3)	36.7 (98.1)	37.8 (100.0)	38.4 (101.1)	37.6 (99.7)	38.4 (101.1)
Mean daily maximum °C (°F)	32.4 (90.3)	31.8 (89.2)	31.9 (89.4)	32.4 (90.3)	31.9 (89.4)	30.4 (86.7)	30.1 (86.2)	30.7 (87.3)	31.7 (89.1)	32.6 (90.7)	33.4 (92.1)	33.1 (91.6)	31.9 (89.4)
Mean daily minimum °C (°F)	24.8 (76.6)	24.6 (76.3)	24.2 (75.6)	22.9 (73.2)	21.0 (69.8)	18.6 (65.5)	17.3 (63.1)	17.8 (64.0)	20.0 (68.0)	22.8 (73.0)	24.6 (76.3)	25.1 (77.2)	22.0 (71.6)
Record low °C (°F)	19.9 (67.8)	20.0 (68.0)	18.2 (64.8)	15.3 (59.5)	12.5 (54.5)	9.7 (49.5)	7.2 (45.0)	8.2 (46.8)	10.0 (50.0)	13.3 (55.9)	17.0 (62.6)	19.7 (67.5)	7.2 (45.0)
Average precipitation mm (inches)	276.3 (10.88)	261.9 (10.31)	293.4 (11.55)	123.3 (4.85)	23.1 (0.91)	1.5 (0.06)	1.6 (0.06)	0.3 (0.01)	1.8 (0.07)	12.5 (0.49)	49.7 (1.96)	214.2 (8.43)	1,284.4 (50.57)
Average precipitation days (≥ 1.0 mm)	14.7	16.0	14.7	8.0	2.5	0.3	0.3	0.1	0.1	1.0	3.5	10.0	71.2
Average afternoon relative humidity (%)	74	78	73	64	56	51	51	52	57	60	62	69	62
Average dew point °C (°F)	25.2 (77.4)	25.2 (77.4)	24.6 (76.3)	22.9 (73.2)	20.7 (69.3)	17.9 (64.2)	17.1 (62.8)	17.8 (64.0)	20.3 (68.5)	22.4 (72.3)	23.8 (74.8)	24.8 (76.6)	21.9 (71.4)
Source: Bureau of Meteorology (1958-2008 data)

== Demographics ==
At the 2016 census, Maningrida and its outstations had a population of 2,366, which included 309 people living on the 30 homelands (outstations) around Maningrida.

== Infrastructure ==
Maningrida is a major regional service centre in central Arnhem Land providing local government, health, accommodation, aviation, education and community services to both the township and surrounding homelands. A number of Aboriginal organisations based in Maningrida play significant roles in governance, employment, cultural preservation and regional development.

=== Local government ===
The West Arnhem Regional Council governs the local government area which includes Maningrida.

=== Community organisations ===
==== Maningrida Progress Association ====
The Maningrida Progress Association was established in 1968 as a social welfare organisation, and registered as a Public Benevolent Institution in 2000. It provides financial assistance for things like housing, community services and projects, funerals, and other events.

==== Bawinanga Aboriginal Corporation ====
The Bawinanga Aboriginal Corporation was established as resource agency for outstations in 1970, and was incorporated in 1979. Maningrida Arts and Crafts, the Bábbarra Women's Centre, Maningrida Wild Foods are all part of Bawinaga. In addition, the corporation manages a team of Indigenous rangers (Bawinanga Rangers – Land and Sea), various maintenance and retail enterprises, and community services.

=== Health ===
The Mala'la Health Service Aboriginal Corporation runs a number of health care services for the community. In March 2021, the service completed its transition from governance by the NT Health Department to being a completely community-managed service run by the corporation.

=== Education ===
==== Maningrida College ====
Maningrida College is a government school providing early childhood, primary school and secondary education for students in Maningrida and surrounding homelands. The school also supports remote home learning centres across central Arnhem Land.

===== Early education education =====
Maningrida has several early childhood education programs and facilities including the Manyankirra Preschool and the Manayingkarírra Creche. The community also hosts a Families as First Teachers (FaFT) program, an early learning and family support initiative for Aboriginal families with young children.

FaFT programs in Maningrida have been recognised as among the largest remote early childhood programs in the Northern Territory. The program incorporates Aboriginal languages and cultural knowledge alongside early childhood learning approaches.

==== Homeland education ====
Education services linked to Maningrida extend to a number of homeland learning centres located across central Arnhem Land. These homeland schools support students living on outstations and remote homelands throughout the region.

The Homelands School Company supports community-led education and homeland learning initiatives in a number of remote Aboriginal communities.

== Culture ==
Maningrida services a large region of north central Arnhem Land extending from Marrkolidjban in Eastern Kuninjku country to the west, to Berriba in Dangbon country in the south, and over as far as Yinangarnduwa, or Cape Stewart, in the east.

There is great cultural diversity, including a variety of different ceremonial practices, styles of art and design, music and dance.

=== Languages ===
Maningrida and the surrounding homelands are among the most linguistically diverse regions in the world on a per capita basis.

Numerous Aboriginal languages are spoken across the community. Languages spoken in the region include Ndjébbana, Kuninjku, Kune, Rembarrnga, Dangbon/Dalabon, Nakkara, Gurrgoni, Djinang, Wurlaki, Ganalbingu, Gupapuyngu, Kunbarlang, Gun-nartpa, Burarra and Australian English. Many residents are multilingual and commonly speak several Aboriginal languages in addition to English.

Ndjébbana, the traditional language of the Kunibídji people, is the primary traditional language associated with Maningrida township itself.

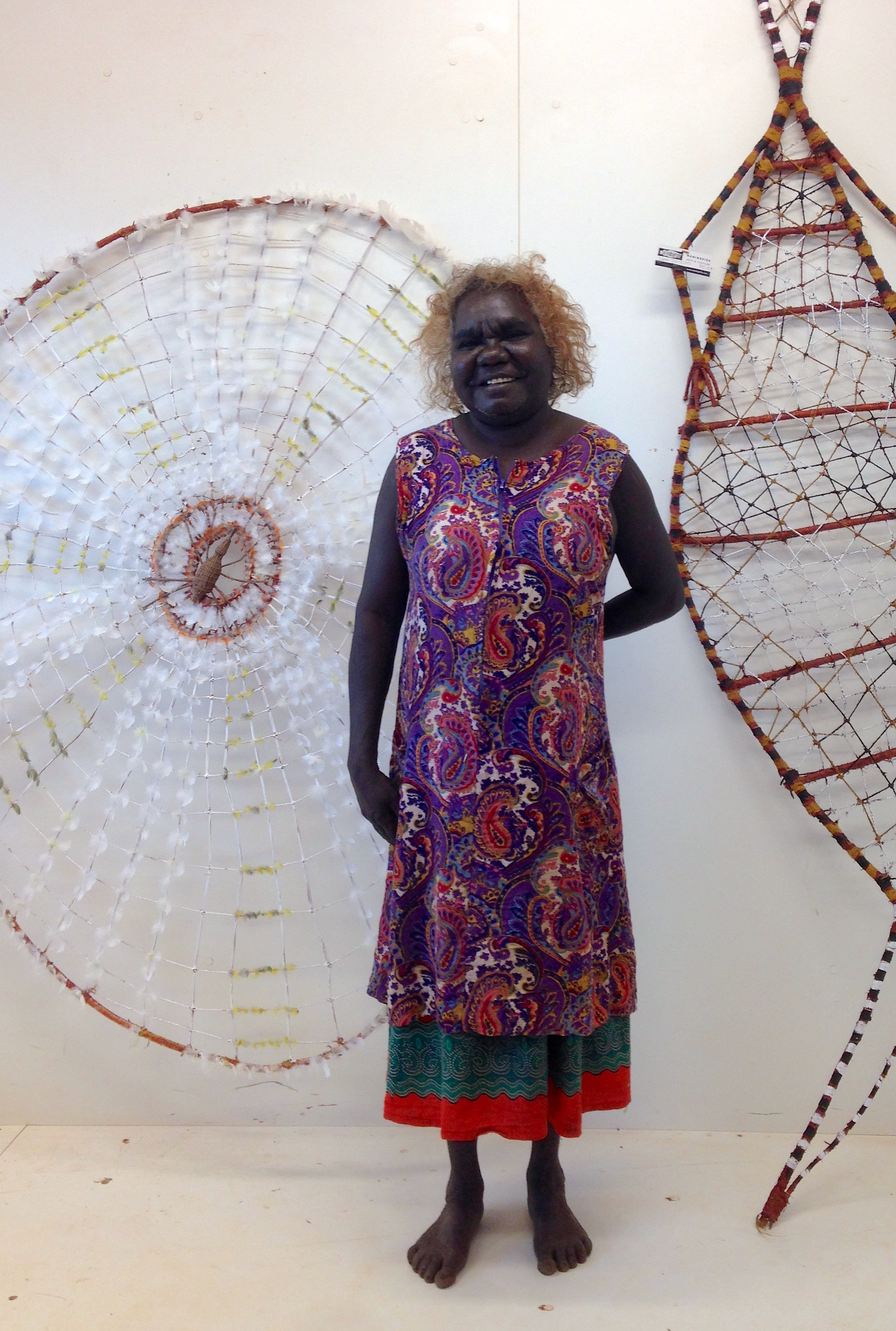
Lena Yarinkura at the Maningrida Arts and Culture Centre

=== Maningrida Arts & Culture ===
Maningrida Arts and Culture, also known as Maningrida Art Centre, represents an art movement built by contemporary artists in Maningrida and the surrounding homelands, with its roots in body art, rock art and cultural practices. Its Djómi Museum contains a collection of nationally and internationally significant artworks, collected since the 1970s with works dating back to the 1940s, including photographs taken by Axel Poignant in the 1950s. Hundreds of artists work at the centre, including internationally acclaimed contemporary artists John Mawurndjul, Owen Yalandja, Crusoe Kurddal, Lena Yarinkura, and Bob Burruwal.

Maningrida Arts and Culture was initially managed by the Maningrida Progress Association, but became part of Bawinanga Aboriginal Corporation in 1979.

=== Lúrra Festival ===
The Lúrra Festival is an annual cultural festival held in Maningrida celebrating Aboriginal culture, music, sport and community life across central Arnhem Land. The festival includes traditional dances, music performances, sporting competitions, fashion events, markets and community activities.

Lúrra brings together participants from Maningrida and surrounding homelands, as well as visitors from other Arnhem Land communities. Events are organised by local organisations and community groups.

The festival has featured performances by local and regional musicians and bands including Wildfire Manwurrk, and other Indigenous artists.

== See also ==
- Maningrida Airport
