= Haul Round Island =

Island in Northern Territory, Australia

Coordinates: 11°57′31″S 134°12′56″E

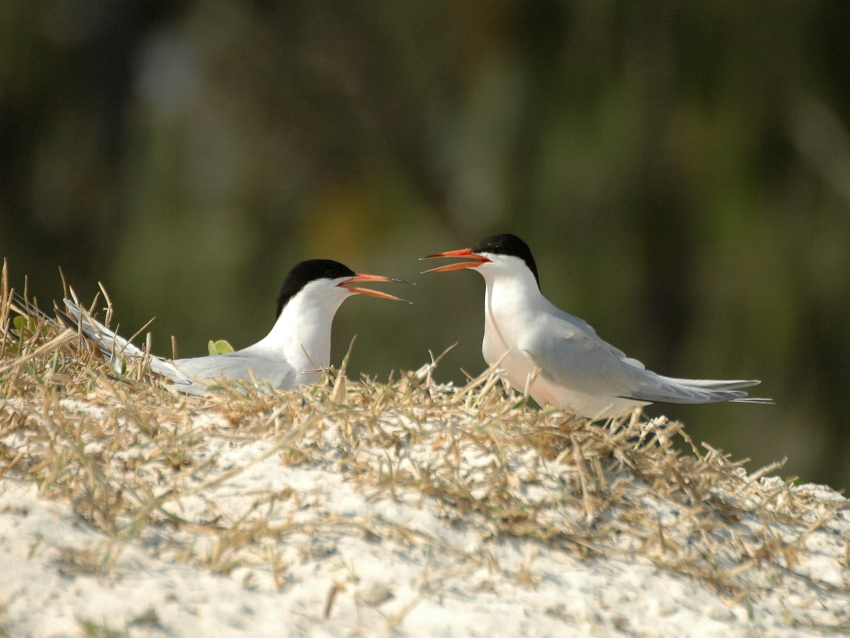
The island is an important breeding site for roseate terns

Haul Round Island is a 6 ha (15-acre) island in the Arafura Sea, lying close to the north central coast of Arnhem Land, in the Northern Territory of Australia. It consists mainly of sand with a few rocks and nearby patches of mangroves. It is close to the town of Maningrida. It has been identified by BirdLife International as an Important Bird Area (IBA) because it has one of the largest seabird colonies in the Northern Territory.

Counts of seabirds at Haul Island show that it supports up to 5000 roseate terns, 5000 bridled terns and hundreds of nesting crested terns, as well as silver gulls. Some 150-200 pied cormorants nest in the mangroves on an adjacent reef. Although the colony is active every year, in some years the roseate terns nest on other islands. Tern eggs are frequently harvested by the Aboriginal traditional owners of the island.
