= Klaus Thorak =

Veterinarian in Australia (1921–1960)

Klaus Eberhard Thorak (28 April 1921 – 26 January 1960) was a German born soldier and veterinarian who spent much of his life in the Northern Territory of Australia. He died in 1960 after a light plane crash in the Timor Sea.

== Early life ==
Tkorak was born in Neukölln, a borough of Berlin, and served as an officer in the German Army during World War II. During the war he married Edith Huttebraucker and, in 1944, they had a son together named Rolf. After the war Thorak studied veterinary science in Germany before choosing, in 1954 to immigrate to Australia.

They sailed to Australia on the SS Surriento and arrived in Fremantle, Western Australia on 10 November 1954.

== Life in the Northern Territory ==
In 1955 Thorak began working as the government veterinary officer in the Northern Territory where he was based in Darwin, and the family lived in Fannie Bay. He was soon promoted to district veterinary officers and was responsible for all animal health related matters in the region. In this role he was involved in a program to eradicate bovine pleuropneumonia in the region, supervising the many small abattoirs in operation and reviving the live export trade of cattle and buffalo to Asia. In order to promote live export he frequently travelled to Hong Kong and Manila on behalf of the government; he was often accompanied by his family. Additionally, in the absence, of private veterinarians he treated privately owned domestic animals.

Thorak was a very popular personality in Darwin and was highly regarded by his friends a colleagues and members of the community.

In January 1960 the Thorak family, including Rolf who was 15, planned to travel to Portuguese Timor for a few days of holidays and Thorak's wife, Edith, had to be convinced to take the trip. They boarded their plane, a De Havilland Heron, a 14-seater Portuguese aircraft, at Darwin Airport on 26 January 1960 and, about 150 kilometres (93 mi) north of Darwin they struck turbulence and the pilot reported large thunder approaching. There was no further contact with the plane and it is believed to have disintegrated or crashed into the sea. It is believed that the pilot had difficulty with poor visibility which he did not have the training for.

A massive sea rescue was performed, with the assistance of the Royal Australian Air Force, and it was then the biggest sea search operation in the Northern Territory. This search located some debris, which had been washed up on the Bathurst and Melville Islands but the plane and passengers were never found.

== Legacy ==
The following locations in the Northern Territory are named for Thorak:

- Thorak Regional Cemetery, which was built on the former location of the Berrimah Experimental Farm and previously where cattle had been held for live export.
- Thorak Road, in Knuckey Lagoon.
