= Airnorth =

Australian regional airline

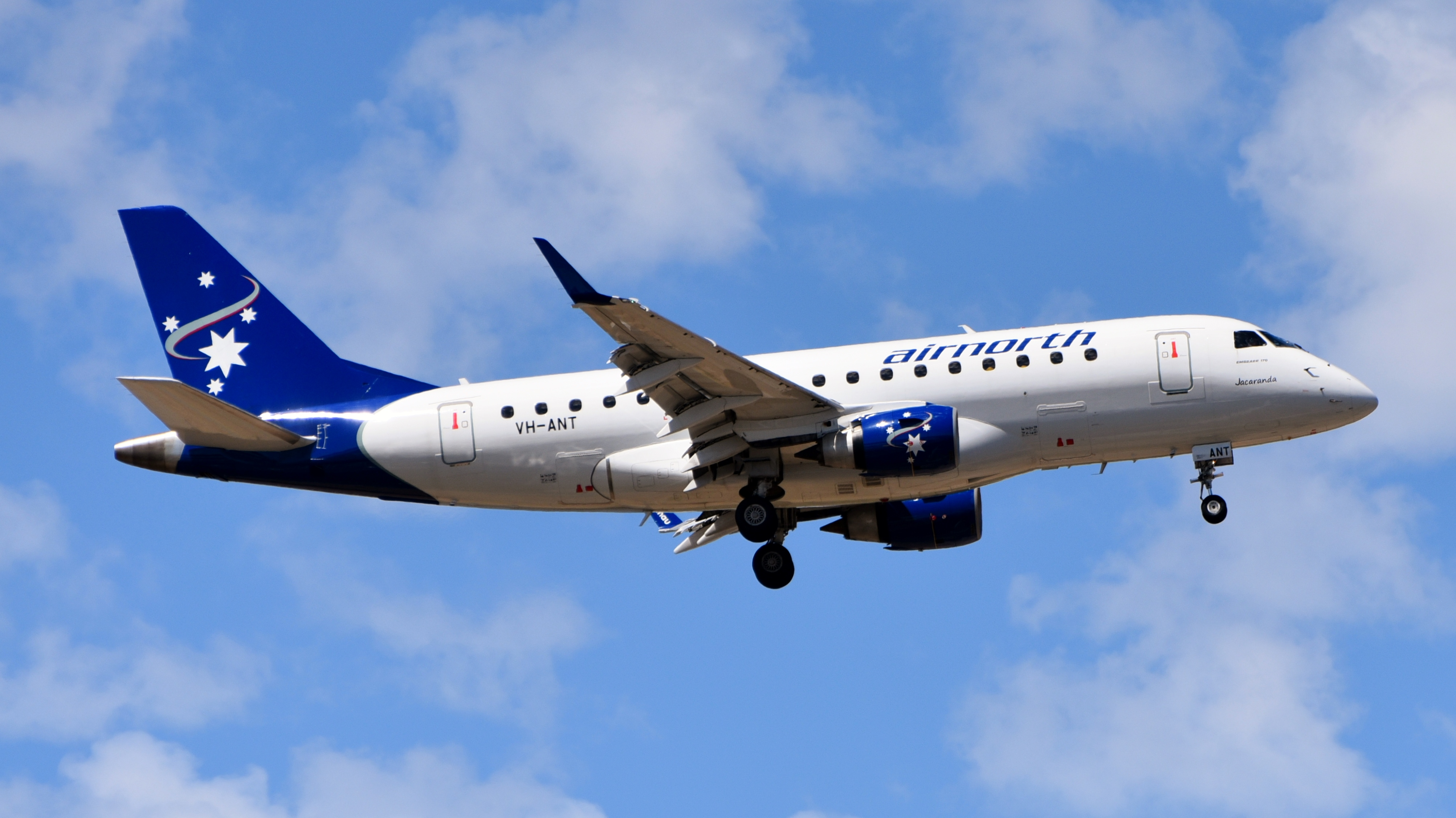
- Airnorth Embraer 170
IATA	ICAO	Call sign
TL	ANO	TOPEND
- Founded: 1978
- Hubs: Darwin Airport
- Frequent-flyer program: None (Note: Previously, flyers could credit flights to Qantas Frequent Flyer, but this partnership ended effective 1 May 2020)
- Fleet size: 14
- Destinations: 21
- Parent company: Bristow Helicopters
- Headquarters: Darwin, Northern Territory, Australia
- Key people: Daniel Bowden (CEO); Simon Gibbons (COO)
- Website: airnorth.com.au

Airnorth is a regional airline based at Darwin Airport in Darwin, Northern Territory, Australia. It operates scheduled and charter services in the Northern Territory, Queensland, Western Australia, Timor-Leste and Papua.

== History ==
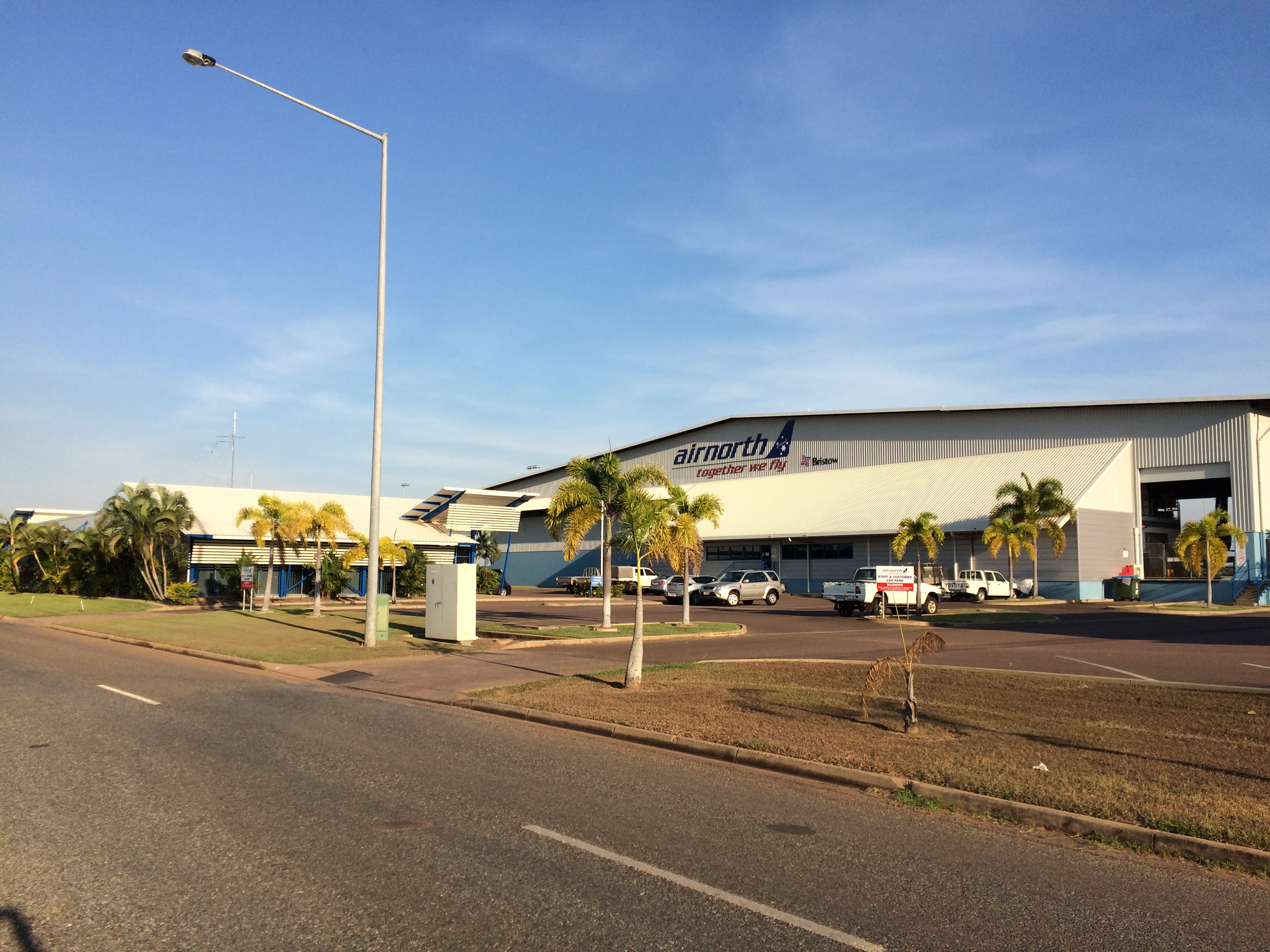
Airnorth headquarters at Darwin Airport

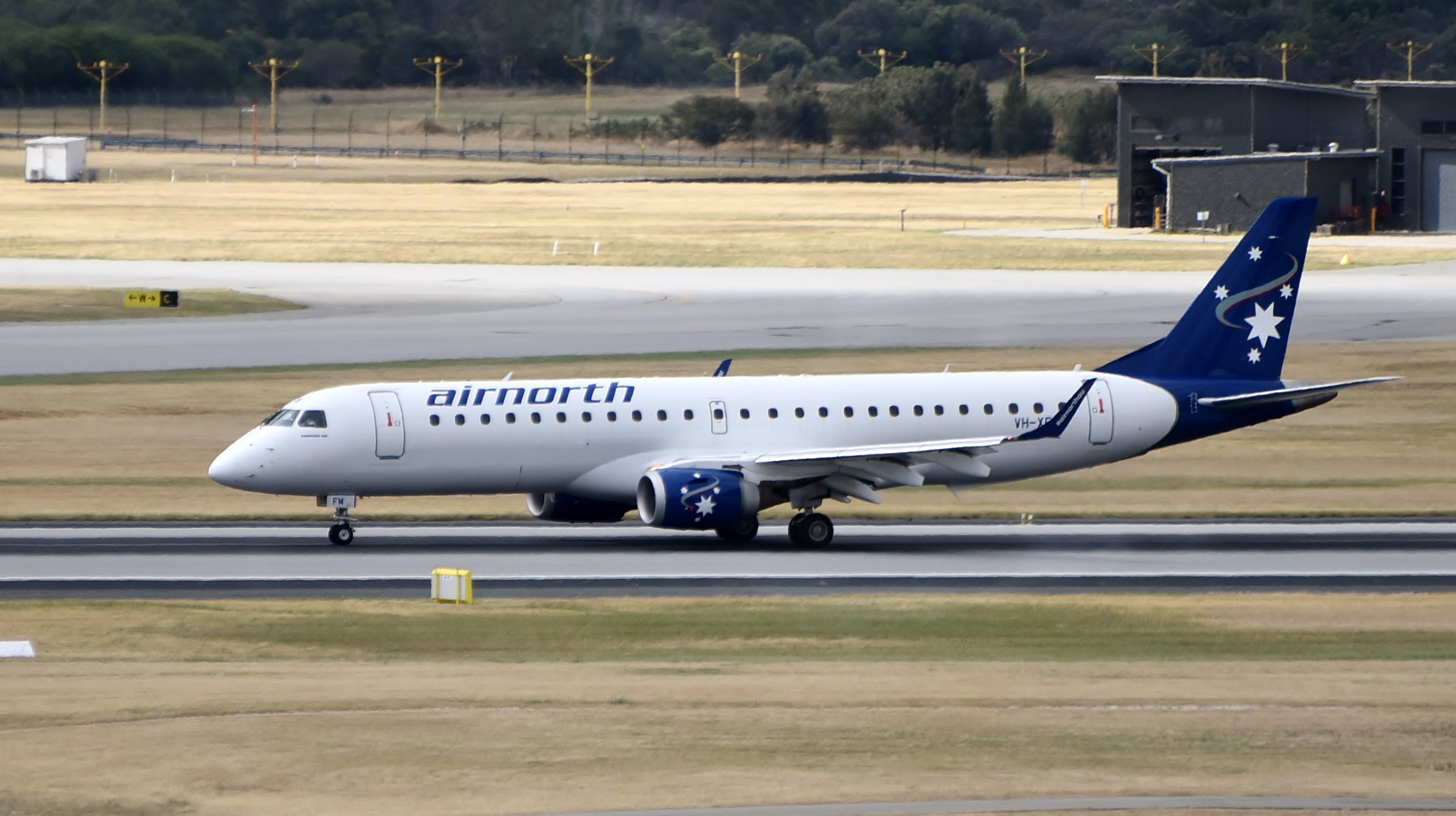
Airnorth Embraer 190 VH-XFM taxiing at Perth Airport

Airnorth was established in 1978 and started operations on 4 July that year as Air North International; it was the result of the merger of Airnorth, Rossair of Adelaide and Tillair of Darwin.

It operated charter flights only until scheduled services were introduced in 1981. At this time, the airline's fleet included a Beechcraft Super King Air as well as a Douglas DC-3. In 1992, Skyport became a major shareholder and in 1993, was sold to Capiteq and renamed Airnorth Regional. During the 1990s, Airnorth had a well established regional network, and by 1997, had introduced both Fairchild Metro 23 and Embraer EMB 120 Brasilia turboprop aircraft to the fleet.

In 1999, Airnorth began operating services in the Northern Territory and Queensland on behalf of Ansett.

In September 1999, Airnorth began operating charters from Darwin to Dili, East Timor, on behalf of the United Nations Transitional Administration in East Timor. In 2000 this became a scheduled service, Airnorth's first international route.

In 2007, Airnorth introduced the Embraer 170 to its fleet, the first jet aircraft operated by the airline. In 2012, it announced a direct service between Darwin and Townsville, the first Australian airline to offer a non-stop connection between these cities.

On 5 February 2015, it was announced that Bristow Helicopters had acquired an 85 percent controlling interest in Airnorth. Bristow stated that Airnorth would retain its name and brand identity. In 2015 Bristow purchased the remaining shares to obtain full ownership.

Under Bristow's ownership, Airnorth responded to a downturn in the mining industry, restructuring the route network by withdrawing services to Karratha, Port Hedland and the Gold Coast. A fifth E-170 joined the fleet in 2016. The increased availability of the jets allowed expansion into South East Queensland and Victoria, commencing operations from Toowoomba Wellcamp Airport to Melbourne and Cairns in March 2016. Within months the airline added further flights from Wellcamp to Townsville with all three new routes codesharing with Qantas.

In 2022, Airnorth expanded its airline seat capacity by introducing two Embraer 190 aircraft to its fleet, enhancing its ability to meet growing passenger demand. By 2024, the airline has further strengthened its operations and now operates a total of three Embraer 190s, providing greater flexibility, efficiency, and comfort across its regional and interstate routes.

In March 2024, Airnorth launched a service from Alice Springs to Perth.

== Destinations ==
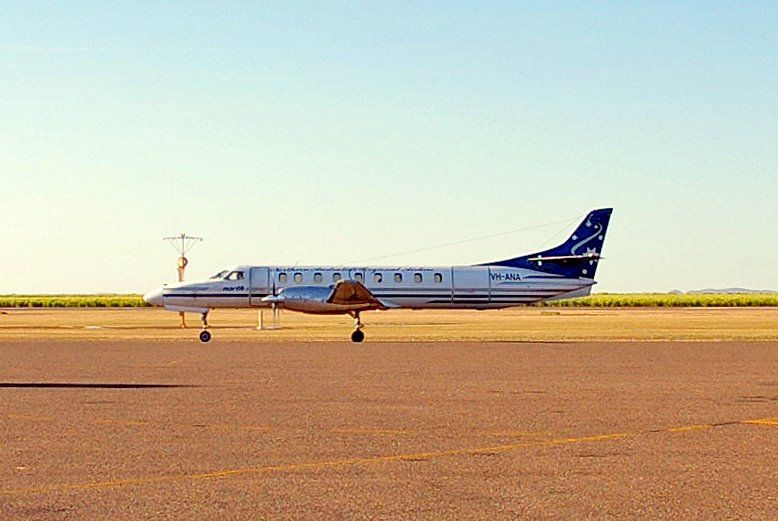
Airnorth Fairchild Metro 23 at East Kimberley Regional Airport

The airline operates over 300 scheduled and contract charter departures weekly, serving 21 domestic and international destinations including:

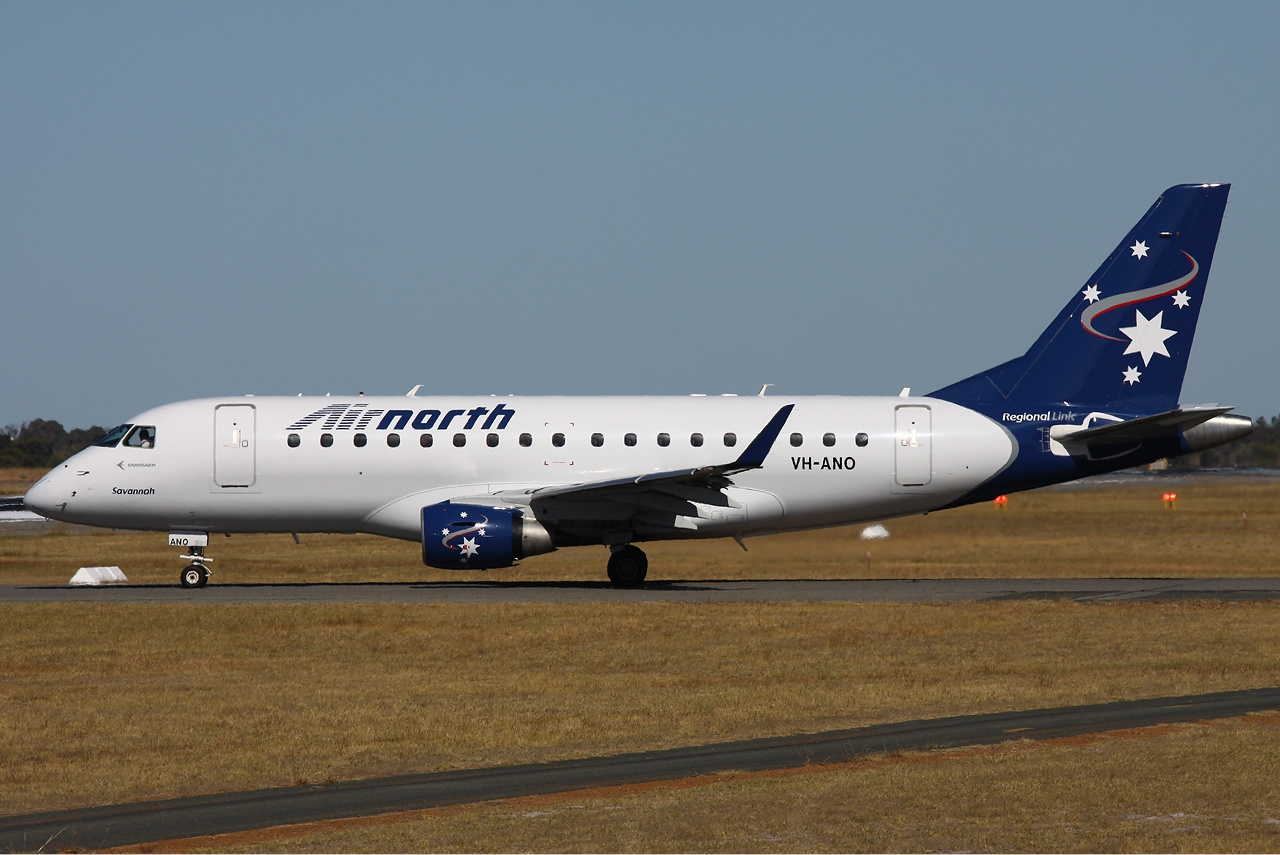
Airnorth Embraer 170 at Perth Airport

- Northern Territory
  - Alice Springs
  - Bootu Creek*
  - Darwin
  - Elcho Island
  - Gove
  - Groote Eylandt
  - Katherine
  - Maningrida
  - McArthur River Mine
  - Milingimbi
  - Tennant Creek
- Queensland
  - Cairns
  - Townsville
- Western Australia
  - Broome
  - Kununurra
  - Perth
  - Truscott
- Indonesia
  - Biak
- Timor-Leste
  - Dili

In addition to scheduled flights, Airnorth operates charter services for a wide variety of companies including mining & resources, defence and government clients.

Airnorth previously flew to Melbourne and Toowoomba before terminating the service in early 2022.

=== Codeshare agreement ===
Airnorth currently has a codeshare agreement with Qantas.

=== Interline agreement ===
Airnorth currently has an interline agreement with Malaysia Airlines.

== Fleet ==
As of August 2025, the Airnorth fleet consists of an all-Embraer fleet composed of the following aircraft:

Aircraft	In Service	Orders	Passengers			Notes
Aircraft	In Service	Orders	J	Y	Total	Notes
Embraer EMB-120	6	—	—	30	30	
Embraer 170	3	—	—	76	76	
Embraer 190	5	—	—	100	100	Dry leased from Alliance Airlines
Total	14	—				

Airnorth also has a dry lease agreement for four Embraer 190 aircraft from Alliance Airlines to complement its existing E170 fleet.

== Incidents and accidents ==
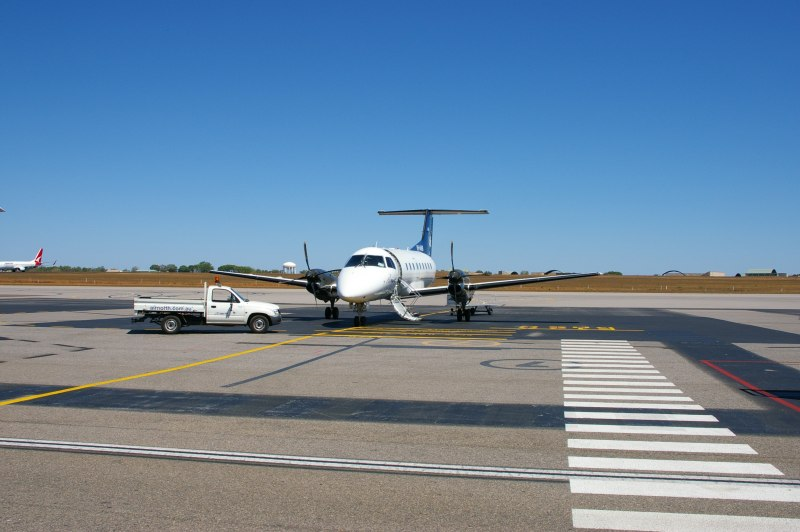
Airnorth Embraer EMB 120 at Darwin Airport

- On 22 March 2010, one of Airnorth's Embraer EMB 120 aircraft (registration VH-ANB) crashed into bushland near the RAAF Base Darwin golf course at approximately 10:10 (ACST), shortly after taking off from Darwin Airport on a training flight. The two crew members, who were the only people on board, were killed.
