= Gove Airport =

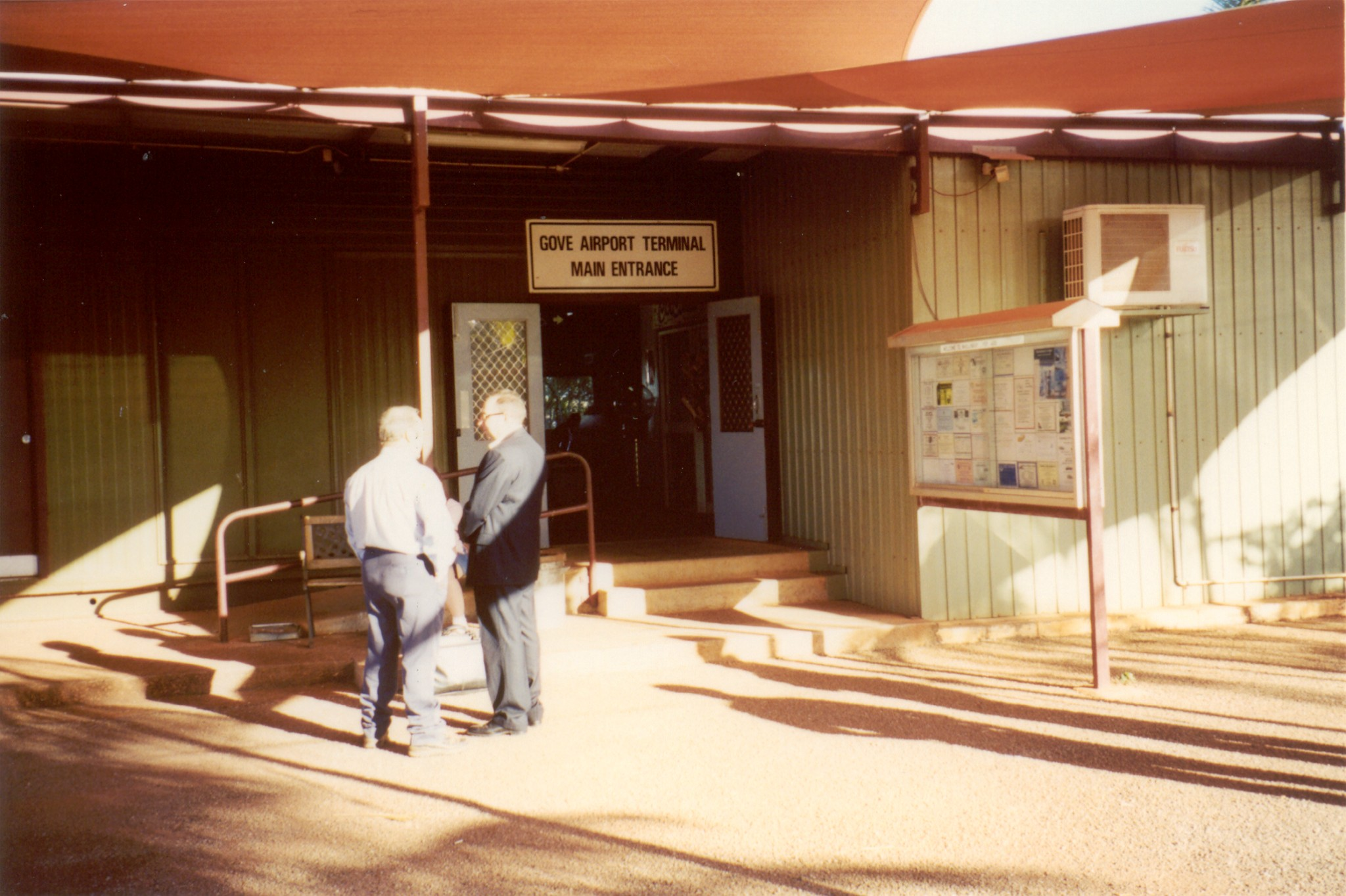
- Main terminal entrance (2002)
- IATA: GOV; ICAO: YPGV

Summary
- Airport type: Public
- Owner: Nhulunbuy Corporation
- Operator: Nhulunbuy Corporation
- Serves: Gove Peninsula, Northern Territory, Australia
- Location: Nhulunbuy
- Elevation AMSL: 205 ft (62 m)
- Coordinates: 12°16′12″S 136°49′06″E

Map
- Location in the Northern Territory

Runways
Direction	Length		Surface
Direction	m	ft	Surface
13/31	2,208	7,244	Asphalt

Statistics (2010–11)
- Revenue passengers: 108,067
- Aircraft movements: 2,702
- Sources: Australian AIP and aerodrome chart Passenger and aircraft movements from the BITRE

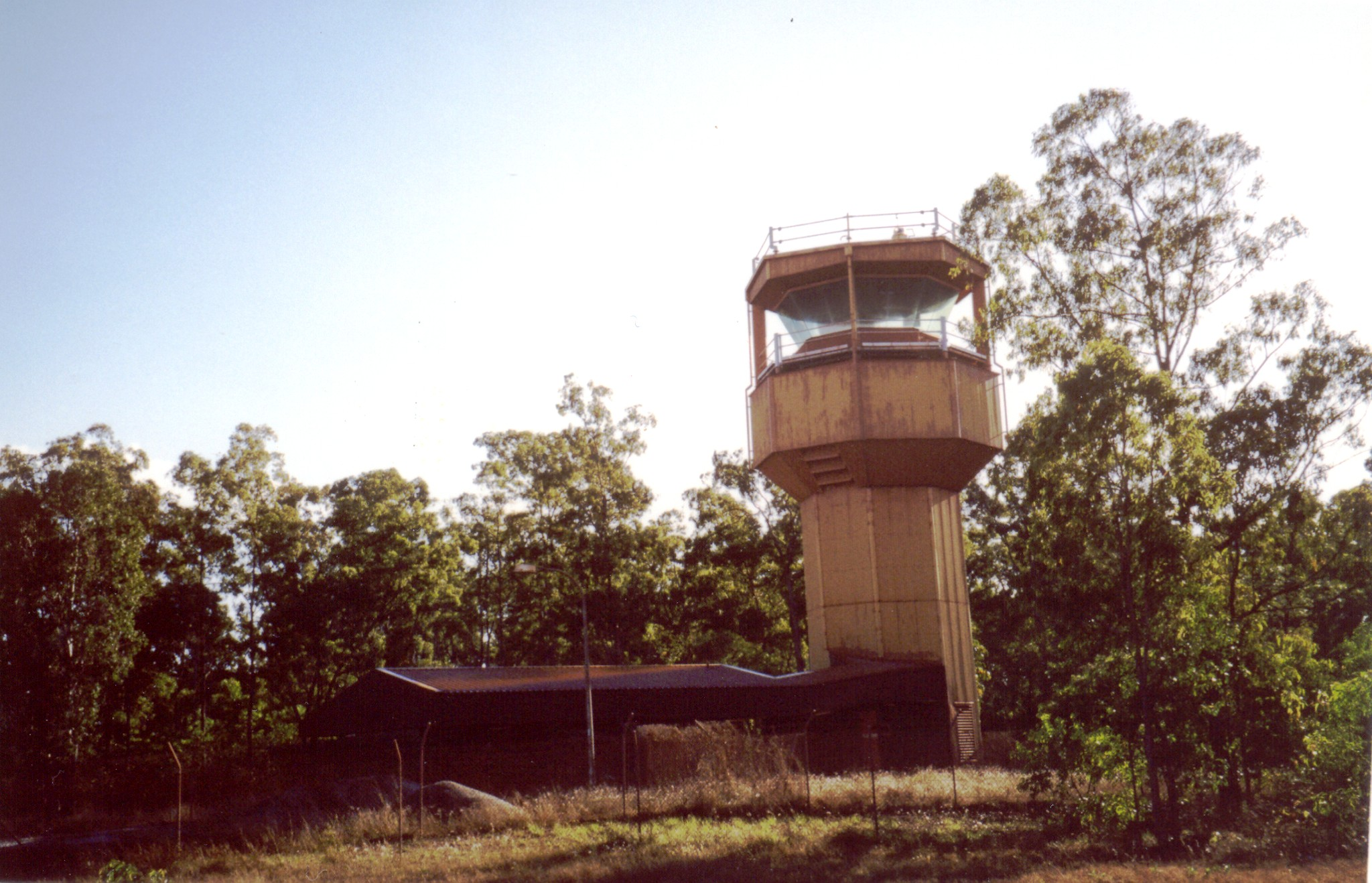
The never-operated control tower (2002)

Gove Airport (IATA: GOV, ICAO: YPGV) (also known as Gove-Nhulunbuy Airport) is on the Gove Peninsula in the Northern Territory of Australia, near the town of Nhulunbuy.

Airnorth operates daily scheduled services to and from Darwin and Cairns and once-weekly services to Groote Eylandt. Scheduled services are also operated by Mission Aviation Fellowship to local communities within the East Arnhem Region.

== History ==
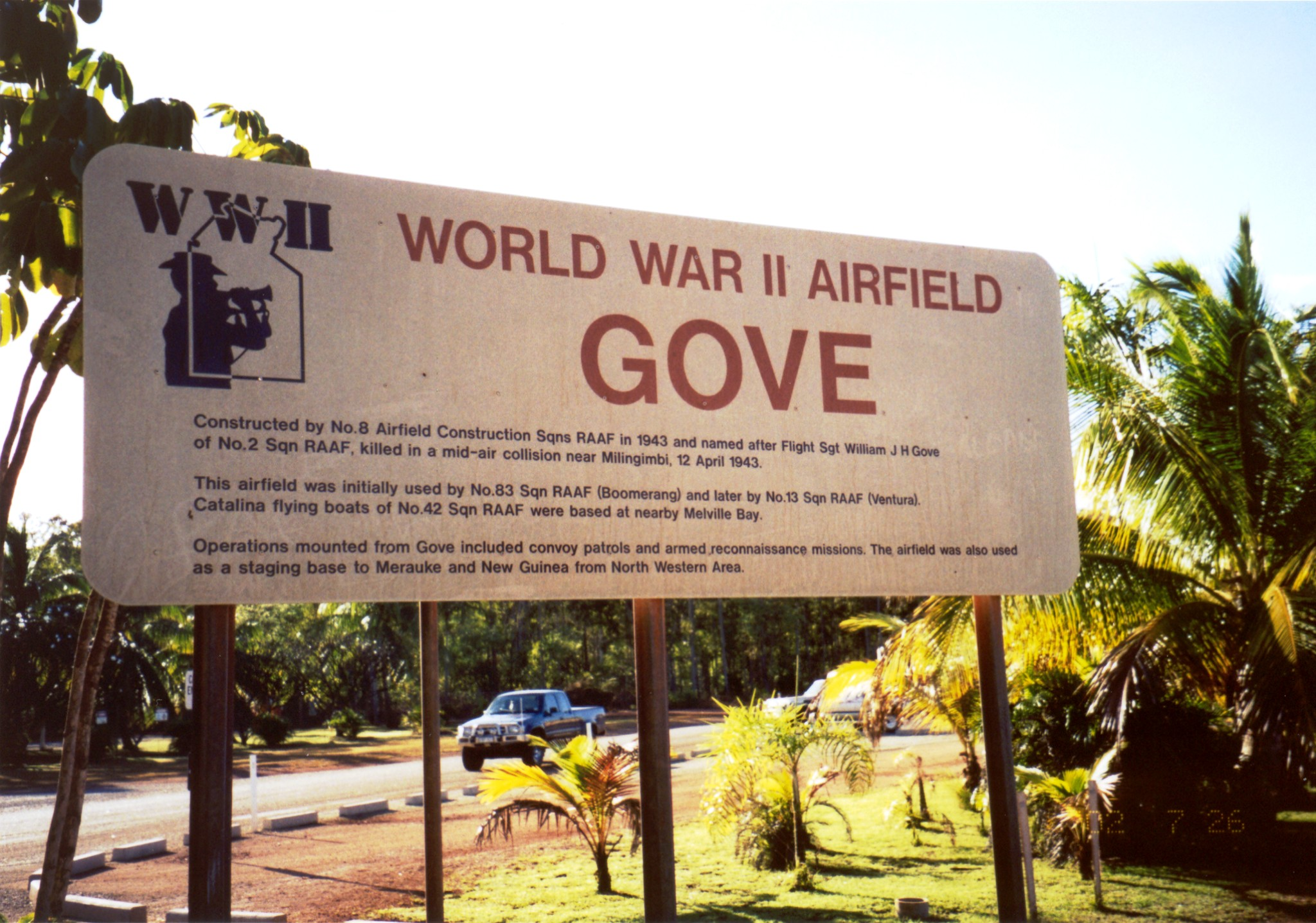
The airport was originally the location of Airfield Gove during World War II.

Gove Airport is located on the site of the former RAAF Base Gove. This World War II airbase was built in 1943 and named for Pilot Officer William Gove, who was killed in action. During the war, the airfield was used by No. 83 Squadron RAAF flying CAC Boomerangs and No. 13 Squadron RAAF flying Lockheed Venturas, with No. 42 Squadron RAAF operating PBY Catalina flying boats out of nearby Drimmie Head. At the height of operations, over 5,000 servicemen were stationed at the base. The base closed in early 1946.

The airport was established in the 1970s. The old terminal was replaced by a new one, shaped like an aircraft, built in 2005-06.

== Description ==
Gove Airport services the mining town of Nhulunbuy and several Aboriginal communities, including Yirrkala. The airport is located 5.8 nautical miles (10.7 km; 6.7 mi) south southeast of the Nhulunbuy town centre, on Melville Road. It is operated by the Nhulunbuy Corporation.

== Facilities ==
The airport is located at an elevation of 205 ft (62 m) above mean sea level. It has one runway designated 13/31 with an asphalt surface measuring 2,208 m × 45 m (7,244 ft × 148 ft).

A new terminal building was completed in 2005, providing an air-conditioned departure lounge and indoor baggage collection.

== Airlines and destinations ==
The airport is a regional hub for air charter operations with various charter companies based and/or operating out of Gove. These include Air Arnhem, Marthakal Yolngu Airline, Katherine Aviation, Air Frontier, Black Diamond Aviation, and Mission Aviation Fellowship.

Airlines	Destinations
Airnorth	Cairns, Darwin, Groote Eylandt, Wessel Islands
Mission Aviation Fellowship	Elcho Island, Lake Evella, Milingimbi, Ramingining
QantasLink	Charter: Brisbane

== Statistics ==
Gove Airport was ranked 61st in Australia for the number of revenue passengers served in financial year 2018–2019.

Annual passenger and aircraft statistics for Gove
Year	Revenue passengers	Aircraft movements
2008–09	125,147	3,196
2009–10	104,075	2,952
2010–11	107,459	2,642
2011–12	102,844	2,718
2012–13	105,144	2,694
2013–14	103,562	2,663
2014–15	62,811	1,978
2015–16	55,984	1,892
2016–17	58,429	2,076
2017–18	59,223	2,015
2018–19	57,298	1,914
2019–20	45,213	1,675
2020–21	40,493	1,547

== See also ==
- List of airports in the Northern Territory
