= Garden Point Airport =

Airport on Melville Island, Australia

- IATA: GPN; ICAO: YGPT

Summary
- Airport type: Public
- Operator: Tiwi Island Regional Council
- Serves: Melville Island, Australia
- Location: Pirlangimpi, Northern Territory, Australia
- Elevation AMSL: 90 ft / 27 m
- Coordinates: 11°23′57″S 130°25′31″E

Map
- Location in the Northern Territory

Runways
Direction	Length		Surface
Direction	m	ft	Surface
04/22	1,315	4,314	Asphalt
- Sources: Australian AIP and aerodrome chart

Garden Point Airport (IATA: GPN, ICAO: YGPT) is located at Pirlangimpi, on the west coast of Melville Island, in the Northern Territory, Australia.

== Airlines and destinations ==
Airlines	Destinations
Fly Tiwi	Darwin

== See also ==
- List of airports in the Northern Territory
