= Bathurst Island Airport =

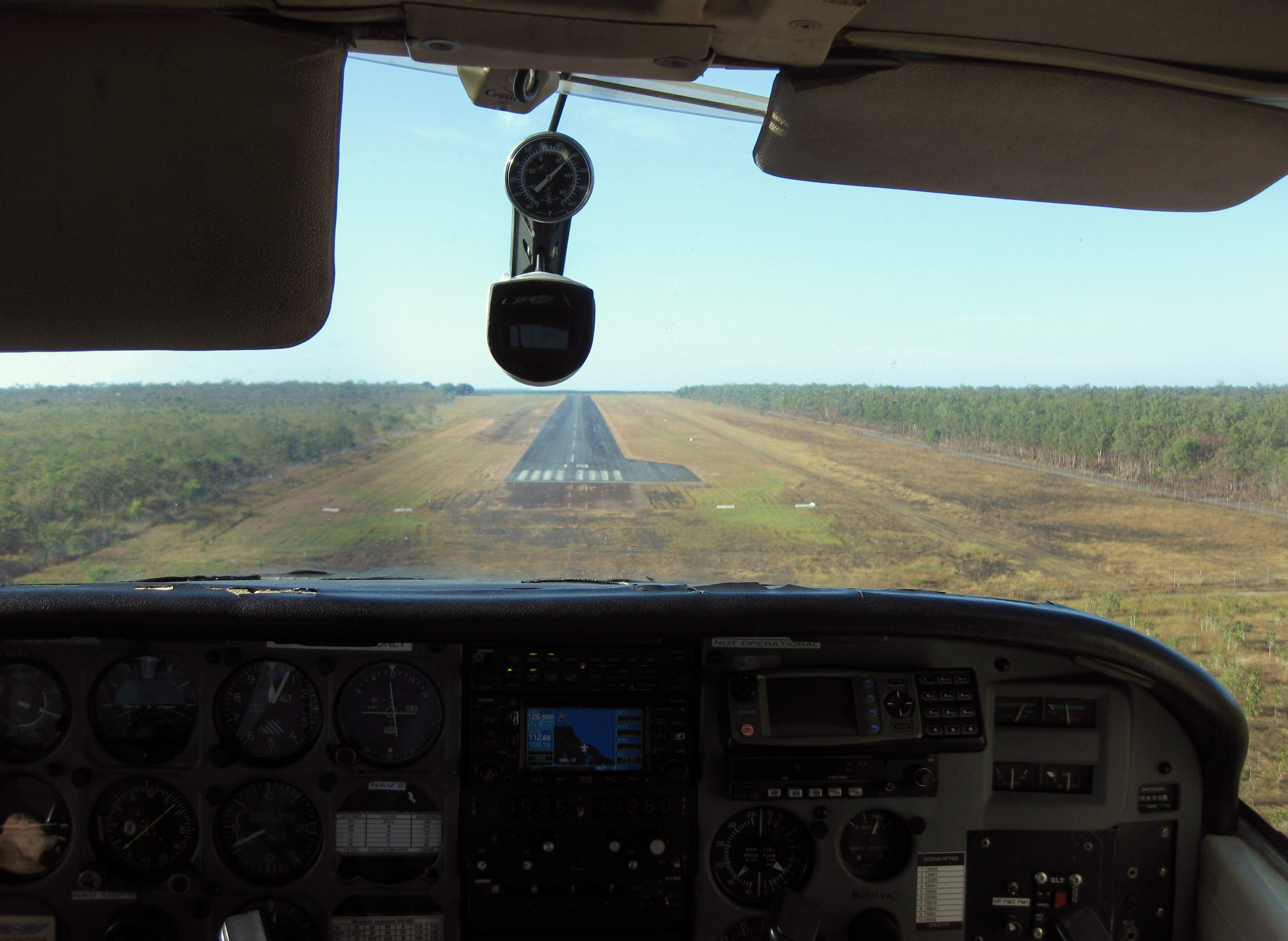
- Bathurst Island runway approach, 2011
- IATA: BRT; ICAO: YBTI

Summary
- Airport type: Public
- Operator: Tiwi Island Regional Council
- Serves: Bathurst Island, Northern Territory
- Location: Wurrumiyanga
- Elevation AMSL: 67 ft / 20 m
- Coordinates: 11°46′09″S 130°37′11″E

Map
- Location in the Northern Territory

Runways
Direction	Length		Surface
Direction	m	ft	Surface
15/33	1,470	4,823	Asphalt
- Sources: Australian AIP and aerodrome chart

Bathurst Island Airport (IATA: BRT, ICAO: YBTI) is an airport located at Wurrumiyanga, on the southeast coast of Bathurst Island, in the Northern Territory of Australia.

The airport has a sealed runway, which is 1,470 m × 30 m (4,823 ft × 98 ft), making it unsuitable for larger commercial jets. However, there are regular, smaller commercial tours to the island. Bathurst Island Airport is 80 km (50 mi) from Darwin International Airport.

== History ==
The Royal Australian Air Force utilised the airfield during World War II. The original airfield is now the public cemetery with the newer strip located 2 kilometres west.

== Airlines and destinations ==
Airlines	Destinations
Fly Tiwi	Darwin

== See also ==
- List of airports in the Northern Territory
