= Milikapiti, Northern Territory =

Town in Northern Territory, Australia

Milikapiti
- Town
- Coordinates: 11.422°S 130.674°E
- Country: Australia
- State: Northern Territory
- City: Melville Island
- LGA: Tiwi Islands Region

Government
  - Territory electorate: Arafura
  - Federal division: Lingiari

Population
  - Total: 414 (SAL 2021)
- Postcode: 0822

Milikapiti is a village on the northern coast of Melville Island, Northern Territory, Australia. At the 2011 census, Milikapiti had a population of 447.

It is 105 kilometres (65 mi) by air from Darwin. Fly Tiwi airlines fly twice daily to and from Darwin servicing Milikapiti. The flight takes approximately 25 minutes.

The day-to-day management of the Milikapiti community is the responsibility of the Tiwi Islands Regional Council.

== History ==
Milikapiti was founded in 1941 as the Snake Bay government aboriginal settlement.

In 1942, aboriginals from Snake Bay captured Australia's first Japanese prisoner of war, Sergeant Hajime Toyoshima, who crash-landed on Melville Island after his plane was damaged while bombing Darwin. The Snake Bay Patrol was also formed from local Indigenous Australians during World War II.

== Community services and facilities ==
- Store and Take Away
- ATM facilities
- Post Office facilities
- School and Pre School
- Recreation Hall
- Basketball court
- Football oval
- Library
- Centrelink agency
- Women's Centre
- Health Centre
- Club (open 4.30pm – 7.30pm 4 days per week)
- Public Garage
- St Monica's Catholic Church
- Museum
- Jilamara Arts and Crafts
