= Fly Tiwi =

Australian airline

- Founded: 2008
- Fleet size: 32 (Fly Tiwi services are operated using aircraft drawn from the Hardy Aviation fleet)
- Destinations: 8
- Parent company: Hardy Aviation
- Headquarters: Darwin, Northern Territory, Australia
- Key people: Andrew Hardy, (managing director)
- Website: www.flytiwi.com.au

Fly Tiwi is an Australian airline based in Darwin, Northern Territory, offering scheduled passenger services between the Northern Territory capital and communities located on the Tiwi, South Goulburn and Croker islands, as well as a number of remote Arnhem Land communities. The company is wholly owned by the Hardy Aviation group, Australia's largest general aviation company, and was founded in 2008 in association with the Tiwi Land Council and, As of 2012 operates over 60 flights per week between 10 destinations.

== History ==
Schedules services under the 'Fly Tiwi' brand commenced in November 2008, offering flights on routes between Darwin and Nguiu on Bathurst Island and connecting Darwin with Pirlangimpi and Milikapiti on Melville Island several times per day. In January 2009 a third route was added providing daily services to South Goulburn Island and the community of Minjilang on Croker Island, and in May began services to Ramingining three times per week, adding a fifth route to Gapuwiyak twice per week in early 2010. Fly Tiwi, since 2017, has been servicing these routes daily from Monday to Friday. On 29 June 2010, Fly Tiwi inaugurated services to Tennant Creek twice per week, but has since discontinued this service. From mid-2017, Fly Tiwi added another route servicing the community of the Milingimbi Island, which it also services Monday to Friday.

Fly Tiwi is a major sponsor of the Tiwi Bombers Football Club, providing air transport for the team to travel to Darwin to compete in the Northern Territory Football League competition since 2010.

In February 2012, Fly Tiwi was one of a number of aviation companies that participated with the Northern Territory Police in 'Operation Bristol', a crackdown on the trafficking of illegal drugs to remote communities which resulted in the seizure of cannabis and kava with an estimated street value of over $300,000.

== Destinations ==
As of 2019, Fly Tiwi offers services to the following destinations:

- Darwin
- Wurrumiyanga (Bathurst Island)
- Minjilang (Croker Island)
- Garden Point (Melville Island)
- Gapuwiyak (Lake Evella)
- Milingimbi Island
- Ramingining
- Milikapiti (Snake Bay)
- Warruwi (South Goulburn Island)
- Maningrida

Flights to and from Darwin International Airport operate out of a dedicated Fly Tiwi terminal located adjacent to the General Aviation apron.

== Fleet ==
Fly Tiwi scheduled flights are operated using aircraft drawn from Hardy Aviation's fleet of 32 aircraft. Typically, twin piston engine, 10 seat Cessna 402 and 404 types are used for regular services. Single-engine Cessna 208B Caravan are also used for regular services. The fleet also includes pressurised Fairchild Metro and Cessna 441s, used for longer routes, as well as a number of smaller types that can operate charters for Fly Tiwi.

Fly Tiwi's fleet
Aircraft	In fleet	Passengers	Notes
Fairchild Metro	2	19	
Cessna 441 Conquest	6	9	
Cessna 404 Titan	7	11	
Cessna 402	5	7	
Beechcraft Baron 58	3	5	
Cessna 210	3	5	
Cessna 208B Caravan	5	11	3 Grand Caravan EX
Cessna 206	3	5	
Total	32		

== See also ==
- List of airlines of Australia
