= Liverpool River =

Liverpool
- Location of the Liverpool River mouth in the Northern Territory
- Etymology: Lord Liverpool

Location
- Country: Australia
- Territory: Northern Territory

Physical characteristics
- Source
  - location: Spencer Range, Arnhem Land, Australia
  - elevation: 161 m (528 ft)
- Mouth
  - location: Australia
  - coordinates: 12°07′00″S 134°10′30″E
  - elevation: 0 m (0 ft)
- Length: 138 km (86 mi)
- Basin size: 8,280 km^{2} (3,200 sq mi)

Liverpool River is a river in the Northern Territory of Australia. It is the largest of the tidal river systems of northern Arnhem Land, which includes two major tributaries, the Tomkinson and Mann Rivers.

== Geography ==
The river rises at the eastern end of the Spencer Range and flows in a north-easterly direction, eventually discharging into the Arafura Sea south of Bat Island and to the south west of the Aboriginal Community of Maningrida. Its major tributaries are the Tomkinson and Mann Rivers.

The estuary formed at the river mouth is tidal in nature and in near pristine condition. The estuary at the river mouth occupies an area of 33.8 square kilometres (13 sq mi) of open water. It is tide dominated in nature with a tide dominated delta having single channel and is surrounded by an area of 60.8 square kilometres (23 sq mi) covered with mangroves.

The river has a catchment area of 8,280 square kilometres (3,197 sq mi) The catchment is wedged between the Goomadeer River catchment to the west, the Blyth River catchment to the east and the Roper River catchment to the south. It has a mean annual outflow of 3,810 gigalitres (4.983×10^{9} cu yd),

== History ==
The river was named by explorer Phillip Parker King in 1818, who named it after the British Prime Minister, Robert Banks Jenkinson, 2nd Earl of Liverpool, otherwise known as Lord Liverpool.

The Liverpool River area was recommended by the explorer Capt. Francis Cadell, following his explorations of 1867–68, as the most likely area in the Top End to succeed as a centre of agriculture and livestock production, and as the site for a capital city. Less than a year later George Goyder and his 100 men were hard at work, founding the city of Palmerston (present-day Darwin), some 500 km to the west.

== See also ==
- List of rivers of Australia § Northern Territory
