= Darwin International Airport =

Airport in Northern Territory, Australia

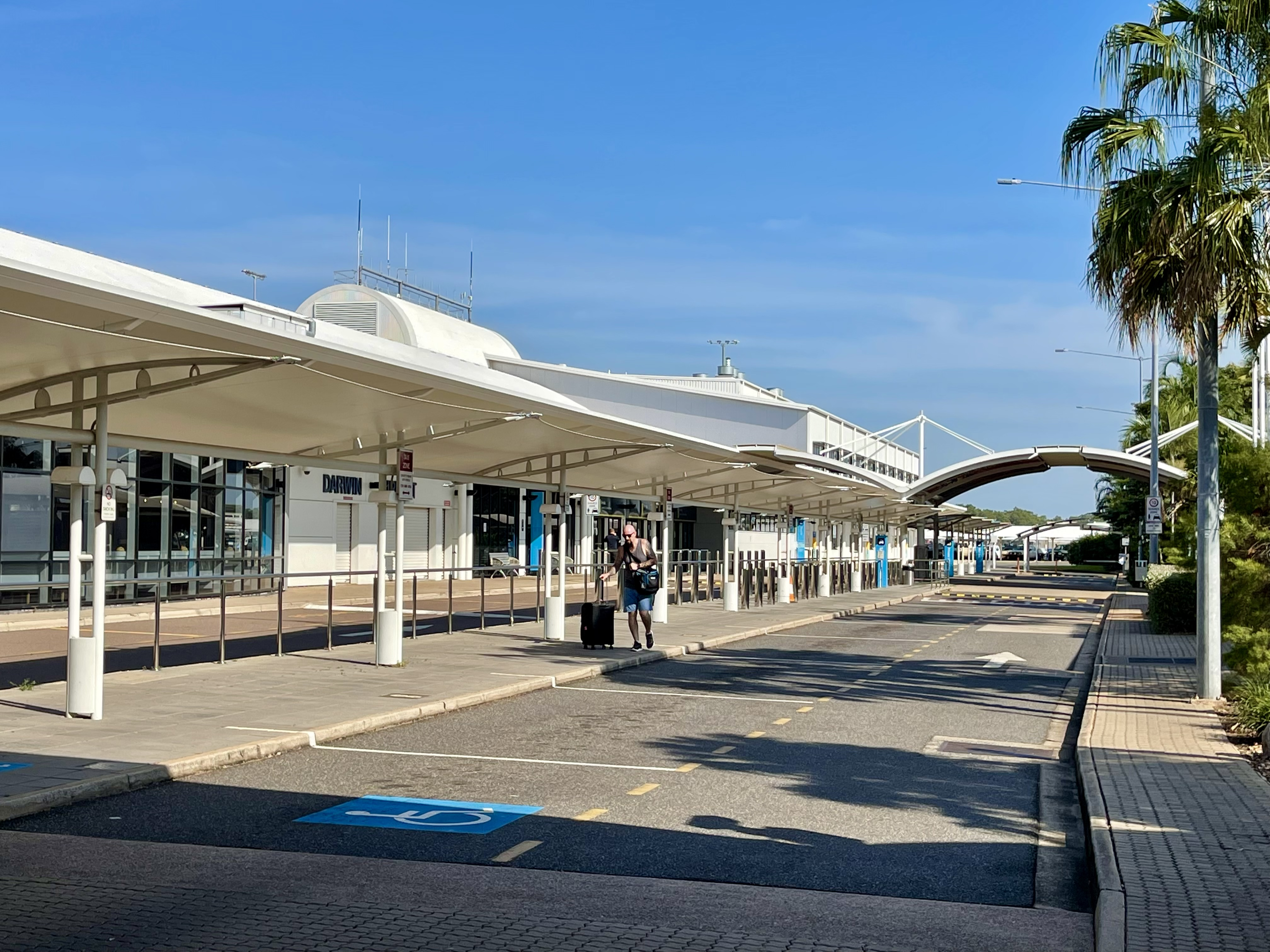
- IATA: DRW; ICAO: YPDN; WMO: 94120

Summary
- Airport type: Public / military
- Owner: Royal Australian Air Force (RAAF)
- Operator: Darwin International Airport Pty Ltd (DIA)
- Serves: Darwin
- Location: Eaton, Northern Territory, Australia
- Hub for: Airnorth
- Focus city for: Qantas
- Elevation AMSL: 103 ft (31 m)
- Coordinates: 12°24′53″S 130°52′36″E
- Website: www.darwinairport.com.au

Map
- Interactive map of Darwin International Airport

Runways
| Direction | Length | | Surface |
| Direction | m | ft | Surface |
|---|---|---|---|
| 11/29 | 3,354 | 11,004 | Asphalt |
| 18/36 | 1,524 | 5,000 | Asphalt |

Statistics (2012)
- Passengers: 1,925,039
- Movements: 26,259
- Sources: Australian AIP and aerodrome chart passenger and aircraftmovements from the Department of Infrastructure and Transport; Darwin International Airport Pty Ltd (DIA) is 100% owned by Airport Development Group of Northern Territory Airports.

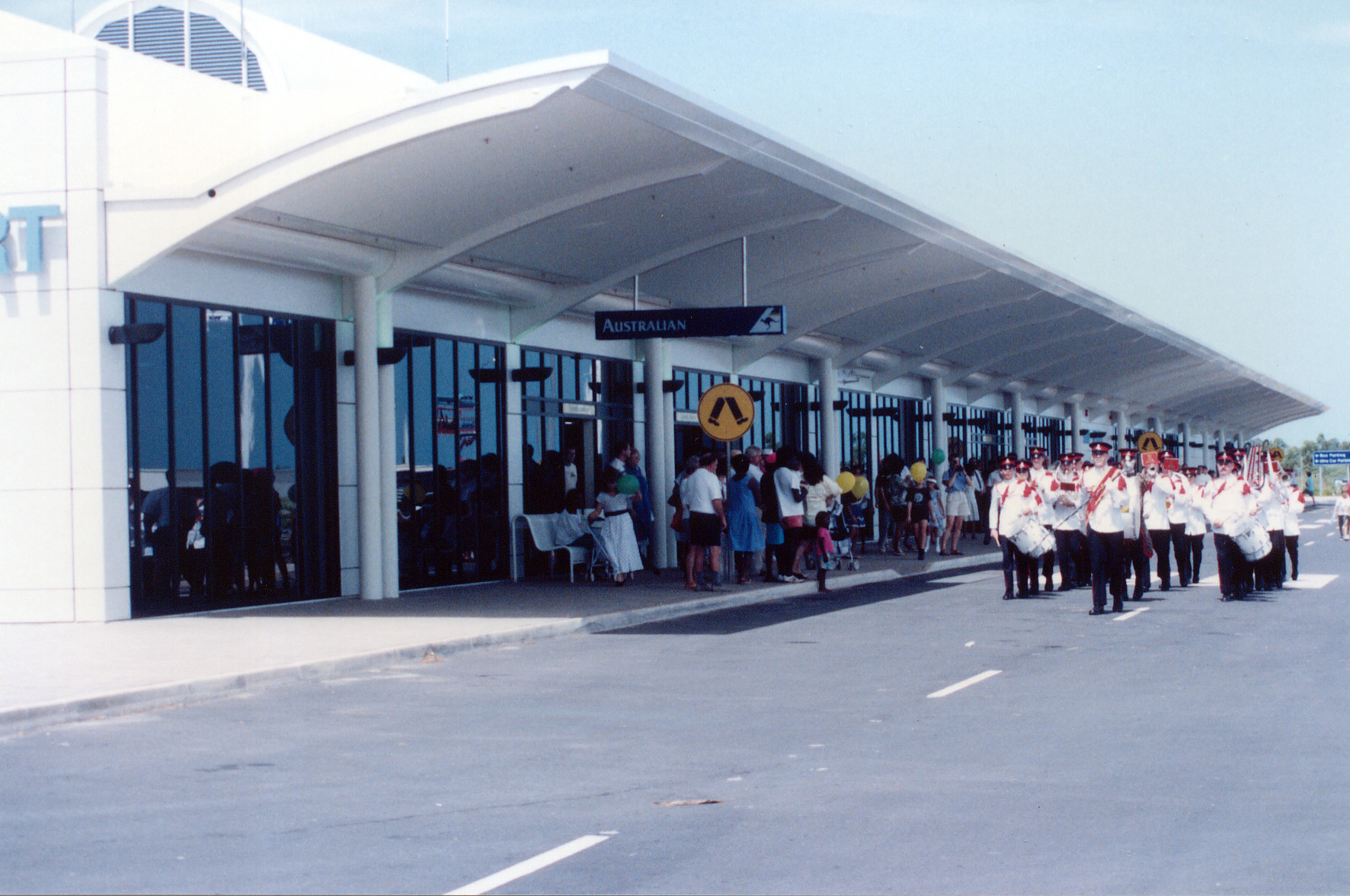
Opening of the new airport terminal in December 1991

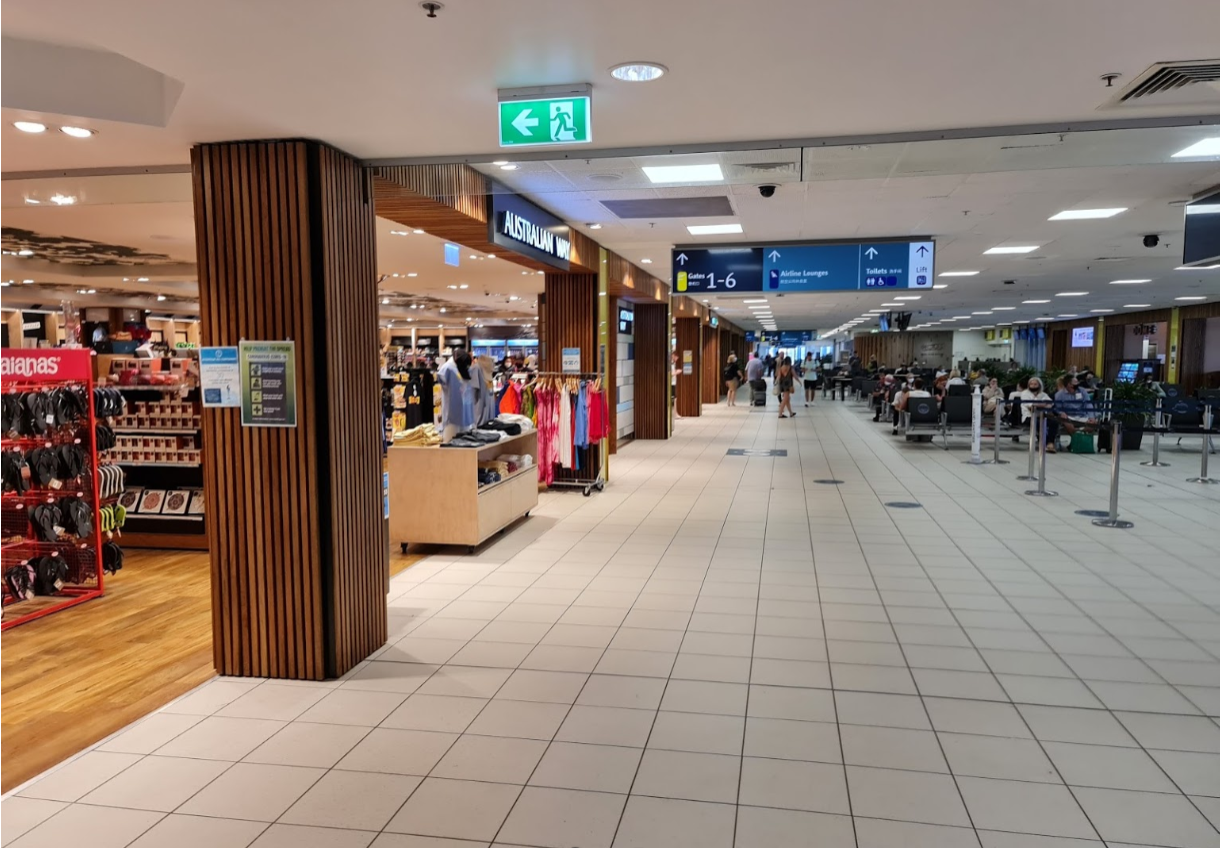
Expanded Darwin Airport Domestic Terminal, 2021

Darwin International Airport (IATA: DRW, ICAO: YPDN) is a domestic and international airport serving Darwin, Northern Territory, Australia. It is the eleventh busiest airport in Australia measured by passenger movements, with almost 1.8 million passengers travelling through in FY 2024. It is the main airport and the sole international airport serving the Darwin area.

The airport is located in Darwin's northern suburbs, 8 km (5.0 mi) from Darwin city centre, in the suburb of Eaton. It shares runways with the Royal Australian Air Force's RAAF Base Darwin.

Darwin Airport has an international terminal, a domestic terminal and a cargo terminal. Both of the passenger terminals have a number of shops and cafeterias.

Darwin was one of only two airfields in Australia (the other being RAAF Base Amberley) that were listed as a Transoceanic Abort (TOA) landing site for the Space Shuttle.

== History ==
=== Early years ===
In 1919, when the England to Australia air race was announced, Parap Airfield was established in the suburb of Parap to act as the Australian terminal. It operated as two airports, a civilian airport and a military field.

The airfield frequently took hits from Japanese bombing through the Second World War, and was used by the Allies to project air power into the Pacific. The airport hosted Spitfires, Hudson Bombers, Kittyhawks, C-47s, B-24 Liberators, B-17 Fortresses and PBY Catalinas.

In 1945, the Department of Aviation made the existing Darwin military airfield available for civil aviation purposes. As a result, the civilian airport at Parap was closed down and civilian airport operations were combined with military operations at Darwin airport.

On 20 April 1954, Soviet spy Evdokia Petrova defected at Darwin Airport while she was being escorted out of Australia by KGB agents.

Between 1950 and 1974 Darwin Airport acted as the primary domestic and international airport for the Northern Territory and an important stop for airlines flying between Australia and Asia and onwards to Europe. Air France, UTA, BOAC, Alitalia and Air India were some of the airlines that had scheduled services to Darwin. However, the introduction of longer range aircraft in the 1970s meant that many airlines did not need to stop over in Darwin, and so they chose to cease services.

Cyclone Tracy hit Darwin in 1974 and flattened the city. The airport was used to ferry 25,628 people out of Darwin. Darwin Airport was extensively used to assist UN operations in East Timor from 1999, and to support medical evacuations following the 2002 Bali bombings.

A new passenger terminal with four aerobridges built by John Holland, opened in December 1991.

=== 21st century ===
Expansion of the low-cost carrier business model in the Australian market during 2007–08 saw both Jetstar and Tiger Airways Australia express interest in developing Darwin Airport as a hub. With Darwin's proximity to Southeast Asia, Jetstar anticipated that it would be able to make flights using smaller aircraft, such as the Airbus A320 to fly anywhere within 4 to 5 hours from Darwin. Singapore-based Tiger maintained a route between Changi Airport and Darwin until 2008, with its Australian subsidiary operating domestically to Melbourne (and later Brisbane). However, plans for a Darwin hub failed to eventuate. Jetstar established a Darwin base, with flights to Singapore, Bali, and Tokyo via Manila but most of these routes would be withdrawn by May 2013.

In 2008, the Australian Infrastructure Fund (AIX), which holds 28.2% of Northern Territory Airports, announced that the airport would undergo a $60 million expansion to cater for growing passenger numbers. Among other improvements, it would provide a 65 per cent increase in terminal floor space.

During the 2008–09 financial year, (Note: 1 July to 30 June) a total of 1,538,938 passengers passed through Darwin International Airport which consisted of 188,530 international passengers and 1,350,408 domestic passengers.

In April 2009, Garuda Indonesia suspended the Denpasar service from Darwin after nearly 30 years of service, citing "economic reasons". The move drew protests from the Northern Territory government. The suspension left Darwin Airport without any non-Australian carriers flying there until late 2010 when Indonesia AirAsia started services from Bali to Darwin. Despite this, the number of passengers passing through the airport grew by 2% to 1,569,007 (207,825 international) passengers during the 2009–10 financial year.

In December 2010, the Federal Government approved the Darwin Airport Master Plan, a 20-year blueprint guiding the airport's development as an international transit point between Europe, Asia and Australia. 2012 and 2013 saw a major boost for Darwin Airport when foreign carriers SilkAir, Indonesia AirAsia, Philippine Airlines and Malaysia Airlines started direct flights to Singapore, Bali, Manila and Kuala Lumpur respectively. However, the increased competition from these carriers forced Jetstar to abandon its base in Darwin and redeploy its aircraft to Adelaide instead. Only flights to Bali were retained; the Singapore route was taken over by Jetstar Asia with Singapore-based aircraft and crews.

On 9 May 2015, a major expansion of the terminal was officially opened. The $85 million expansion increased the floor area from 16,000 to 27,000 square metres (172,223 to 290,626 sq ft) to double the capacity of the airport at peak periods. Works enlarged the arrivals and departures areas, added four new domestic and two new international boarding gates, additional security screening areas, a larger check-in area and a new multi-use baggage reclaim area for both domestic and international arrivals. New Qantas and Virgin Australia lounges opened with the expansion as well as additional Duty Free and retail options.

In October 2021, due to border restrictions because of the COVID-19 pandemic, Qantas confirmed that it would temporarily operate its flagship direct route from Australia to London via Darwin, with the Northern Territory city in place of their usual Perth hub until June 2022.

In January 2026, it is announced that TransNusa will launch an international flight to Lombok, Indonesia and the route was scheduled to be operate in late February.

== Facilities ==
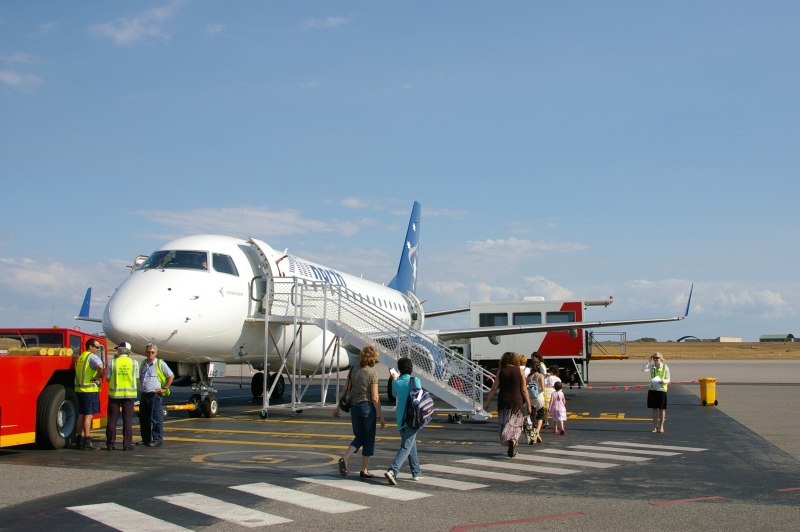
Airnorth aircraft at Darwin International Airport

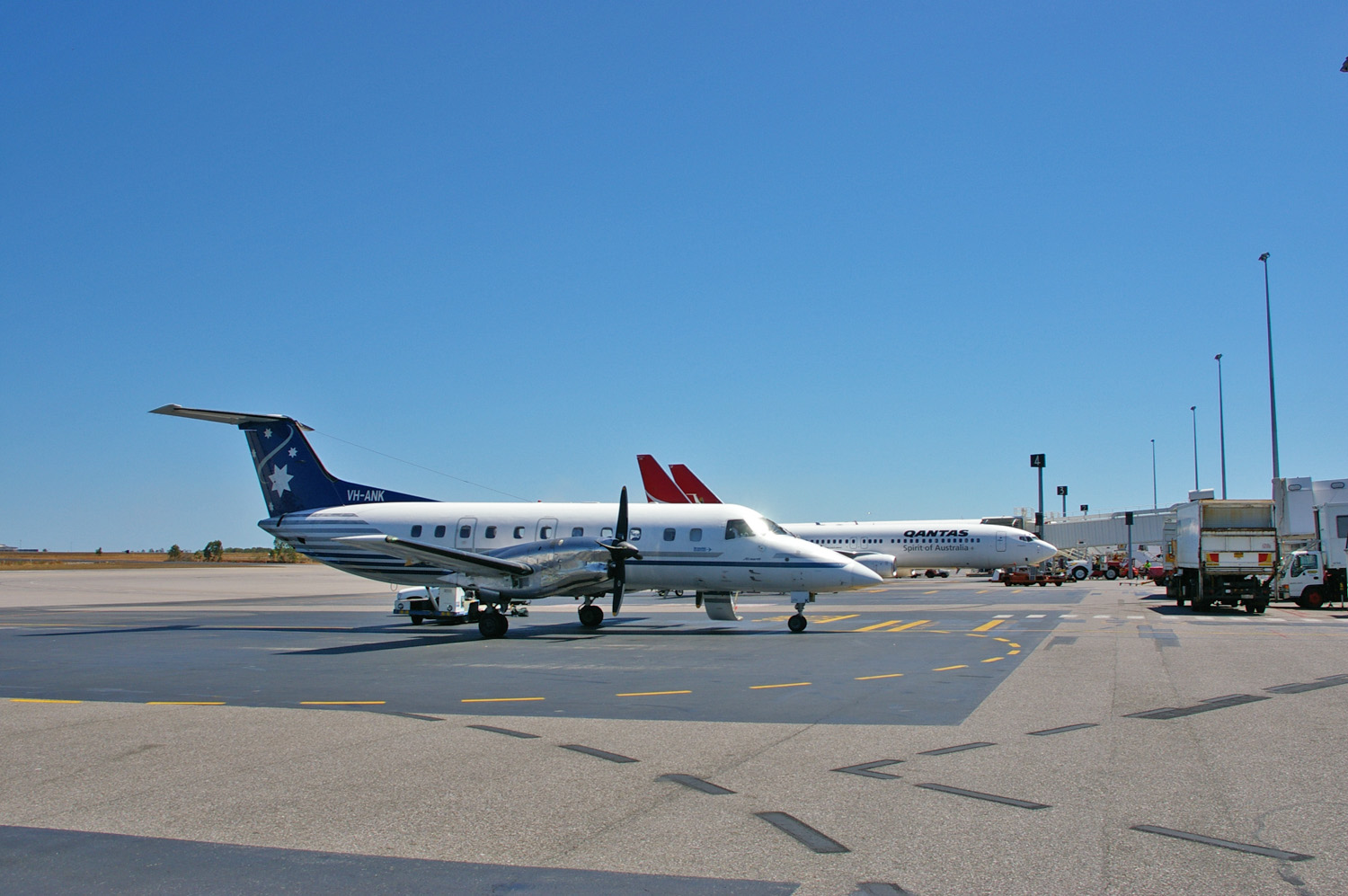
Darwin International Airport tarmac, 2007

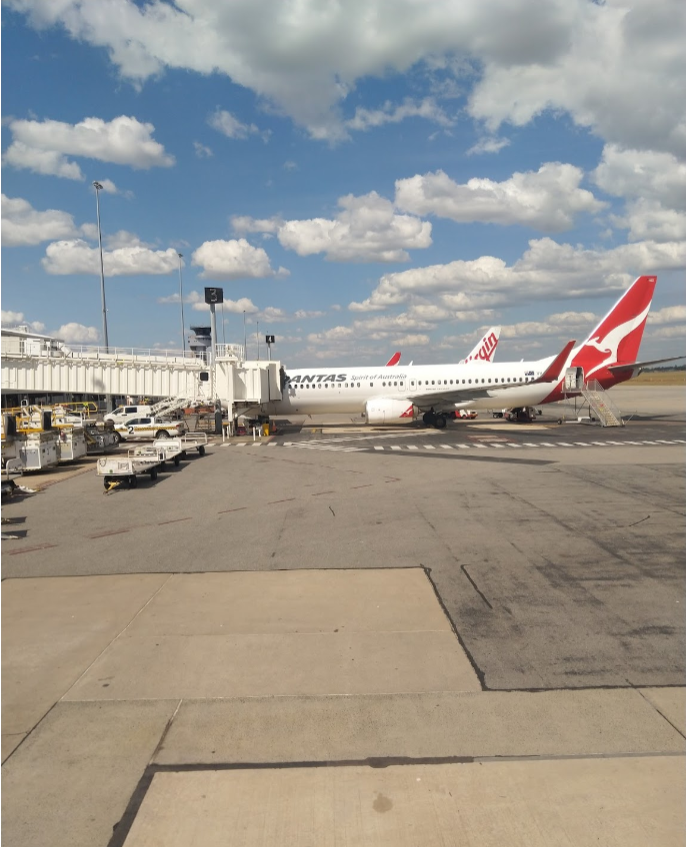
Darwin International Airport tarmac, 2019

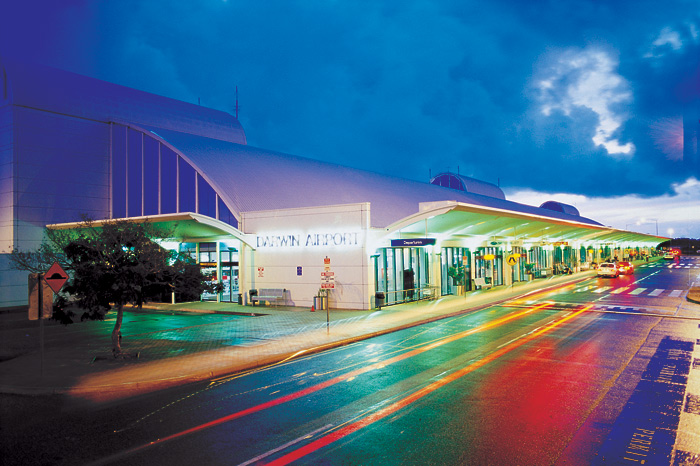
Darwin International Airport at night, 2007

Darwin Airport offers scheduled flights to regional destinations in the Northern Territory, domestically throughout Australia and in Southeast Asia. Domestic and international services operate from a single terminal. Civilian operations are concentrated on the northern side of the airfield, where the main terminal building is located. Regional airline Airnorth has its head office and maintenance facilities on the airport property and Bristow Helicopters also maintain a base of operations to supporting the resources industry. There are two general aviation aprons north of the main terminal building.

The area south of runway 11/29 and adjacent to the Stuart Highway is occupied by RAAF Base Darwin and Darwin Aviation Museum. It is used predominately for military operations.

Darwin airport electricity needs are partially met by two photovoltaic solar arrays. Stage 1 covers six hectares near the eastern end of the main runway, generates up to 4.0MW of electricity, and opened on 5 August 2016. At the time of construction it was described as the largest airside photovoltaic system in the world. Stage 2 provides a further 1.5 MW, and opened in December 2016 near the general aviation apron on the western side of the airport.

== Airlines and destinations ==
| Airlines | Destinations |
|---|---|
| Aero Dili | Dili |
| Airnorth | Alice Springs, Cairns, Dili, Elcho Island, Gove, Groote Eylandt Katherine, Kununurra, Tennant Creek, Townsville; Charter: Biak |
| China Southern Airlines | Guangzhou |
| Fly Tiwi | Warruwi |
| Jetstar | Adelaide, Brisbane, Denpasar, Melbourne, Sydney; Seasonal: Gold Coast |
| Qantas | Adelaide, Brisbane, Melbourne, Perth, Sydney; Seasonal: Singapore (begins 12 June 2027) |
| QantasLink | Alice Springs, Cairns, Dili; Seasonal: Canberra |
| Singapore Airlines | Singapore |
| Virgin Australia | Brisbane Melbourne, Perth; Seasonal: Sydney |

== Operations ==
=== Total ===
Annual Passenger Statistics for Darwin Airport (Year Ending 30 June)
| Year | Domestic | International | Total |
|---|---|---|---|
| 1986 | 360,283 | 46,551 | 406,834 |
| 1987 | 365,648 | 53,885 | 419,533 |
| 1988 | 399,484 | 69,487 | 468,971 |
| 1989 | 409,948 | 85,775 | 495,723 |
| 1990 | 302,213 | 95,737 | 397,950 |
| 1991 | 403,424 | 92,219 | 495,643 |
| 1992 | 474,651 | 87,892 | 562,543 |
| 1993 | 514,017 | 96,549 | 610,476 |
| 1994 | 593,277 | 113,889 | 707,166 |
| 1995 | 685,619 | 138,398 | 824,017 |
| 1996 | 789,875 | 141,703 | 931,578 |
| 1997 | 827,226 | 156,567 | 983,793 |
| 1998 | 834,575 | 176,707 | 1,011,282 |
| 1999 | 856,519 | 171,156 | 1,027,675 |
| 2000 | 904,051 | 153,070 | 1,057,121 |
| 2001 | 905,598 | 172,290 | 1,077,888 |
| 2002 | 834,821 | 127,768 | 962,589 |
| 2003 | 895,866 | 89,306 | 985,172 |
| 2004 | 989,334 | 84,106 | 1,073,440 |
| 2005 | 1,107,519 | 103,215 | 1,210,734 |
| 2006 | 1,102,924 | 116,454 | 1,219,378 |
| 2007 | 1,269,468 | 134,217 | 1,403,685 |
| 2008 | 1,388,973 | 173,243 | 1,562,216 |
| 2009 | 1,350,374 | 188,530 | 1,538,904 |
| 2010 | 1,360,078 | 207,825 | 1,567,903 |
| 2011 | 1,435,294 | 252,214 | 1,687,508 |
| 2012 | 1,716,536 | 357,210 | 2,073,746 |
| 2013 | 1,627,636 | 313,032 | 1,940,668 |
| 2014 | 1,750,829 | 338,826 | 2,089,655 |
| 2015 | 1,798,261 | 292,218 | 2,090,479 |
| 2016 | 1,809,562 | 258,467 | 2,068,029 |
| 2017 | 1,834,319 | 284,136 | 2,118,455 |
| 2018 | 1,808,425 | 251,181 | 2,059,606 |
| 2019 | 1,747,118 | 235,299 | 1,982,417 |
| 2020 | 1,256,812 | 183,458 | 1,440,270 |
| 2021 | 909,594 | 75 | 909,669 |
| 2022 | 1,144,363 | 47,783 | 1,192,146 |
| 2023 | 1,631,970 | 160,331 | 1,792,301 |
| 2024 | 1,593,329 | 188,352 | 1,781,681 |
| 2025 | 1,627,703 | 234,831 | 1,862,534 |

=== Domestic ===
Domestic aviation activity in and out of Darwin Airport (Year ending 30 June 2025)
| Rank | Airport | Passengers carried | % change |
|---|---|---|---|
| 1 | Brisbane | 344,969 | ▲9.3% |
| 2 | Melbourne | 294,515 | ▲3.5% |
| 3 | Perth | 188,906 | ▲8.6% |

=== International ===
Busiest international routes – Darwin Airport (year ending 31 December 2025)
| Rank | Airport | Passengers handled | Airlines |
|---|---|---|---|
| 1 | Singapore | 123,281 | Qantas, Singapore Airlines |
| 2 | Denpasar | 106,185 | Indonesia AirAsia, Jetstar |
| 3 | Dili | 33,963 | Airnorth, QantasLink |

== Accidents and incidents ==
- On 26 January 1960, a Transportes Aéreos de Timor (TAT) de Havilland Heron, registration CR-TAI, crashed north-west of Bathurst Island in the Timor Sea, approximately one hour after taking off from Darwin on a flight to Baucau, Portuguese Timor. Two crew members and seven passengers were killed. The passengers included Klaus Thorak, a prominent Northern Territory government veterinarian, his wife and their 15-year-old son. It is believed that the pilot had difficulty with poor visibility, for which he had not been trained.
- On 25 December 1974, Douglas C-47B PK-RDB of Seulawah Air Services was damaged beyond economic repair by Cyclone Tracy.
- On 22 March 2010, an Embraer EMB 120 Brasilia operated by Airnorth crashed after takeoff during a training flight. A check and training pilot and pilot under instruction were the only occupants and were both killed in the accident. Shortly after becoming airborne from runway 29, the pilot-in-command closed the power lever to simulate a failure of the left engine. During the manoeuvre, control was lost. The aircraft rolled left, pitched nose down and impacted the ground close to the golf course at RAAF Base Darwin. The subsequent investigation conducted by the Australian Transport Safety Bureau found that the incorrect throttle setting used by the pilot-in-command resulted in a simulated failure of the propeller auto-feathering system that increased the aircraft's tendency to roll, and that the pilot under check increased power on right engine, further increasing the roll. The crew failed to abandon the manoeuvre once control was lost. As a result of the accident, Airnorth now conducts most flight proficiency training using a simulator.

== See also ==
- List of airports in Darwin
- List of airports in the Northern Territory
- Transportation in Australia
- United States Army Air Forces in Australia (World War II)
