= Nhulunbuy =

- Town
- Interactive map of Nhulunbuy
- Coordinates: 12°10′57″S 136°46′55″E
- Country: Australia
- State: Northern Territory
- LGA: Unincorporated area
- Location: 1,016 km (631 mi) E of Darwin; 18 km (11 mi) NW of Yirrkala; 729 km (453 mi) ENE of Katherine

Government
  - Territory electorate: Mulka
  - Federal division: Lingiari

Area
  - Total: 7.12 km^{2} (2.75 sq mi)
- Elevation: 20 m (66 ft)

Population
  - Total: 3,267 (UCL 2021)
- Postcode: 0881, 0880
- {{{blank_name_sec2}}}: 30.8 °C (87.4 °F)
- {{{blank1_name_sec2}}}: 23.3 °C (73.9 °F)
- {{{blank2_name_sec2}}}: 1,305.3 mm (51.39 in)

Nhulunbuy (/nʊlənbɔɪ/), also formerly known as Gove, is a town and locality in the far north of the Northern Territory of Australia. Founded on the Gove Peninsula in north-east Arnhem Land when a bauxite mine and deep water port were established in the late 1960s, the town's economy largely revolved around its alumina refinery until it closed in May 2014. The town is a private mining town residing on Aboriginal-owned land.

Nhulun, named Mount Saunders by Matthew Flinders, is a 200-metre (660 ft) flat-topped hill rising behind the town, which gets its name from this sacred site. In the 2021 census, the locality of Nhulunbuy had a population of 3,350 people.

== History ==
This area in Northeast Arnhem Land has been home to various Yolŋu clans of Aboriginal people for at least 40,000 years.

Matthew Flinders, in his circumnavigation of Australia in 1803, met the Macassan trading fleet near present-day Nhulunbuy, an encounter that led to the establishment of settlements on Melville Island and the Cobourg Peninsula. A beach close to the township is named Macassan Beach in commemoration of this encounter.

Flinders also named the highest rise on the low-lying escarpment, a flat-topped hill rising to 200 m (660 ft), Mount Saunders. This hill was a sacred site for the Rirratjingu clan of Yolŋu people, who already had a name for it – Nhulun. The site had been assigned to Wandjuk Marika by his father, the respected elder Mawalan Marika. Flinders named it Mt Saunders after Robert Dundas, 2nd Viscount Melville. Flinders also gave names to various other nearby features after the same man, including Mount Dundas, Melville Isle (renamed Bremer Island in 1934), and Melville Bay (which now includes Gove Harbour).

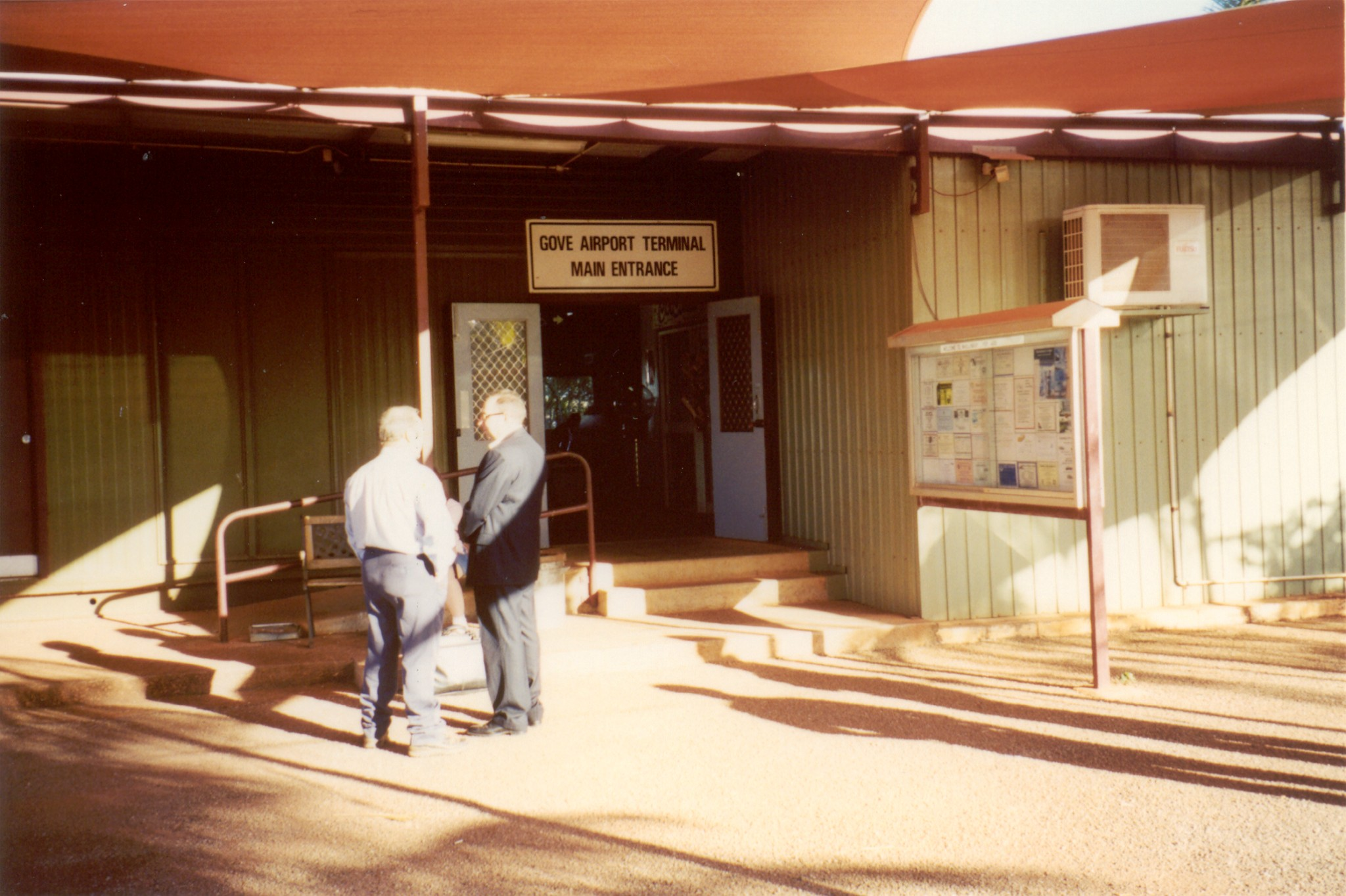
The old airport terminal at Gove Airport

Exploration of bauxite reserves in the area began in 1955. In 1963, an Australian Government decision excised part of the land for a bauxite mine and alumina refinery, to be developed by the Gove Bauxite Corporation, a French-owned company known as GOMINCO. The Yolŋu people at Yirrkala were upset at not having been consulted about the excising of their land, and forwarded two petitions, known as the Yirrkala bark petitions because they were mounted on bark, to the Australian House of Representatives. The federal government appointed a select committee to investigate the people's grievances, which made recommendations to protect certain sacred sites and allocate hunting rights in some areas. Although they remained unsuccessful, the bark petitions attracted national and international attention, and are now regarded as a landmark in the fight for Indigenous land rights in Australia. One of the petitions hangs in Parliament House, Canberra.

After GOMINCO had abandoned its bid for the site, in 1968 the Gove Agreement was negotiated between the Commonwealth Government and the North Australian Bauxite and Alumina Company (Nabalco), which gave Nabalco the rights to establish the mine and refinery.

The new mining town was gazetted as Gove, but a conference of Yolŋu elders decided that the town should be named Nhulunbuy; Nhulun was the Yolŋu name for Mount Saunders, next to which the town was to be laid out, and -buy means "from". They created the Wuyul petition, decorated with a picture of ancestral spirit Wuyul the Honey Man, who is believed to have created the features of Nhulun. This petition was presented to Parliament by Gough Whitlam, and it was reported widely by newspapers, which backed the change of name. The petition was successful, and the town was renamed as requested.

In 1969, Nabalco assigned its interests in the agreement to the Gove Joint Venture Participants (Swiss Aluminium and Gove Aluminium Ltd.), and the government granted a Special Mineral Lease (SML 11) and several Special Purpose Leases to this entity. In 1971, the Yolŋu people at Yirrkala took court action against Nabalco and the Commonwealth Government, in a case later known as the Gove land rights case. The people asked for their lands to be freed from occupation by the mining company and prevention of further mining activities; the main issue was recognition by Australian law of the rights of Aboriginal people to ownership of the land through the doctrine of communal native title. The plaintiffs lost the case, which was presided over by Justice Blackburn. Nabalco developed the mine, plant, and associated infrastructure, and began its export of alumina bauxite in 1972.

The town of Nhulunbuy was established to house the workers employed by the company. The town was originally gazetted as Gove on 21 August 1968, but, after a delegation of Yirrkala people who said that Nhulunbuy was the name given to the area Dreamtime ancestor Wuyal, Prime Minister John Gorton (who was in office from January 1968 to March 1971), on a visit to the NT, announced that the town would be given this name. It was only officially renamed Nhulunbuy in 2007. The name of the town is derived from combining "Nhulun" (Mount Saunders) and buy, which means "nearby" in the local language.

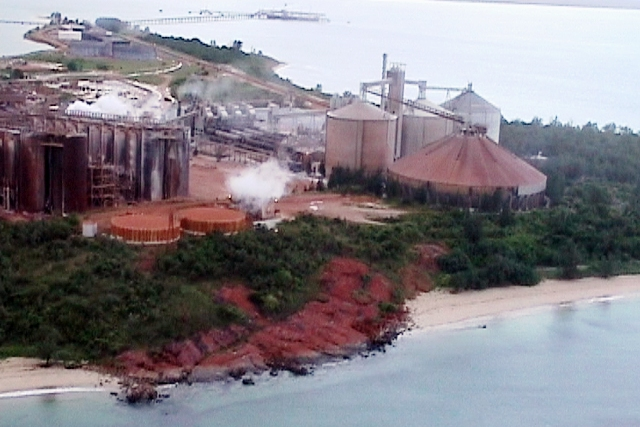
Alumina plant at Nhulunbuy, June 2000

Nabalco became Alcan Inc. and acquired 100% of the Gove project in 2001. In 2003, Alcan Gove issued a notice of intent to the Government of the Northern Territory re third stage expansion of the alumina refinery. Rio Tinto acquired Alcan in 2007.

The alumina refinery closed in May 2014, which resulted in 1,100 workers being redeployed or made redundant, and reduced the Nhulunbuy population by 700 to 3,240 in the 2016 Australian census.

On 29 November 2013, Rio Tinto announced the closure of the alumina refinery (but not the bauxite mine) by July 2014, with the loss of 1,100 jobs, or almost 25% of the town's population. The refinery ceased production in May 2014. Nhulunbuy's population had already dropped by mid-2014, with some of the workforce retained to monitor the shutdown and survey holding ponds full of toxic compounds, but most scheduled to be gone by January 2015. A range of measures were announced to support the town and its former workers through the closure and the following three years, but locals anticipated further cuts to services, since the school, hospital, power plant and flights were backed by Rio Tinto. The closure of the refinery also left flights on the Darwin-Nhulunbuy route to fall to around 50 to 60 per cent full, causing QantasLink to suspend flights on the route from 17 August 2014.

For the purposes of granting tax rebates to residents of isolated areas as per Section 79A(3F) of the Income Tax Assessment Act 1936, the census population of Nhulunbuy was taken to be less than 2,500, although it was in fact 3,240 in the 2016 census.

In 2019, the Arnhem Space Centre near Nhulunbuy, an equatorial satellite launch facility, was announced. In June 2022, it was announced that NASA would launch three rockets from the Arnhem Space Centre. This is the first time NASA launched a rocket from a commercial launch site outside the United States.

== Geography ==
The hill behind the town, Mount Saunders or Nhulun, has an elevation of 200 m (660 ft).

== Governance ==
Nhulunbuy is an unincorporated area. It is a "Special Purpose" private mining town situated on Aboriginal Land, with a complex tenure. Since 1972, Nhulunbuy Corporation Ltd has controlled the town. Since 2022 and as of December 2025, Shane Whitten is CEO of the company.

The town is within the Northern Territory Electoral division of Mulka, and the federal Division of Lingiari.

The Territory division was created in 1974 for the first election of the Legislative Assembly, then named Nhulunbuy. It was renamed Mulka in the 2019 redistribution, when the division was enlarged significantly outside the town. Mulka is a Yolŋu Matha word, for which several translations have been offered: according to the NT Electoral Commission, it means "dry area", also used to describe a meeting place for business and diplomatic discussions. According to the Buku-Larrŋgay Mulka Centre website, the word means "a sacred but public ceremony", as well as "to hold or protect". In the 2024 NT election, Independent Yingiya Mark Guyula was elected for Mulka by a large margin, although the town of Nhulunbuy voted for candidate Allen Fanning by a small margin.

The federal Division of Lingiari was established at the 2001 election, with the present boundaries gazetted on 4 March 2025. It was named in honour of Vincent Lingiari, the Indigenous land rights leader who led the Gurindji strike in 1966. At the 2025 Australian federal election, Australian Labor Party candidate Marion Scrymgour won the seat with 44.64% of votes cast.

== Tourism and recreation ==
Most supplies and visitors are brought by air to Gove Airport or by sea.

Visitors need to obtain a permit from Dhimurru Aboriginal Corporation, a Yolŋu-owned and -operated not-for-profit organisation that looks after the Dhimurru Indigenous Protected Area, covering 550,000 ha (1,400,000 acres) of Aboriginal land and sea country, to access certain recreation areas, including:

- The Roy Marika Lookout is located at the summit of Nhulun / Mount Saunders, accessible via Wuyal Road, or via the Nhulunbuy Walk Trail Network's Nhulun Walk. The walk from Nhulunbuy town centre to the lookout is around 4 km (2.5 mi) there and back.
- Gadalathami, the Town Beach, on the eastern side of the town, is the closest beach to Nhulunbuy. It faces the Gulf of Carpentaria.
- Dharrpamiwuy, or Middle Beach, is around 5 km (3.1 mi) from the town, and serves as the venue for the Nhulunbuy Rotary Club's annual Beach Volleyball Tournament. The beach has white sand and plenty of shade.
- Wirrwawuy (Cape Wirrawoi) is a popular fishing spot, around 5 km (3.1 mi) away via a sealed road.

Nhulunbuy is around 18 km (11 mi) north of the community of Yirrkala, famous for its Aboriginal art, and home to the Buku-Larrŋgay Mulka Centre, where the Yirrkala church panels are held.

== Facilities ==
East Arnhem Regional Council provides services to residents such as:

- aged care and disability services
- animal management
- childcare services
- nutrition and wellbeing programs
- youth, sport and recreation programs

Healthcare facilities include Gove District Hospital, community clinics, sobering up shelters, and community patrol services.

A supermarket was built when mining operations started, but in early 2026, Woolworths announced that it would be closing its operations in the town by 30 June 2027.

== Education ==
There are three schools in Nhulunbuy: Nhulunbuy Primary School, Nhulunbuy High School, and Nhulunbuy Christian College.

Nhulunbuy Primary School was established as Nhulunbuy Area School in 1972, becoming a primary school in 1981. It is one of the largest primary schools in the Northern Territory.

Nhulunbuy Christian College, established as Nhulunbuy Christian School in 1999, is a non-denominational primary and middle school. Northern Territory Christian College provides senior school education.

Nhulunbuy High School, which opened in 1981, caters for students in years 7–12. In 2017, Nhulunbuy High School opened a $20 million boarding facility, which provides increased educational opportunities to remote students.

== Media ==
As a result of the refinery curtailment and subsequent loss of advertising revenue, Gove's only source of local news, the Arafura Times, published its final issue in mid-October 2016.

Gove Online publishes news about Nhulunbuy and East Arnhem Land.

== In film ==
A feature film called The Boat With No Name, directed by local filmmaker Phil O'Brien (also an author, musician, and former crocodile farmer, who describes himself as a raconteur), premiered at Gove Boat Club early in 2022. All of the actors are locals, with the lead role taken by O'Brien. Local businesses provided A$10,000 of funding to the low-budget film, which showcases the area and characters, "and captures the ethos of the East Arnhem region: Indigenous and non-Indigenous people (Yolŋu and balanda) working together to create something new".

== Climate ==
Nhulunbuy has a tropical savannah climate (Aw). Temperatures are hot year round with very warm nights. The wet season lasts from December to May and experiences consistent and very heavy rainfall. Rainfall does occur during the dry season, but it usually is very uncommon and limited. Nhulunbuy has a very narrow temperature range like most tropical climates, with a temperature range of only 23.8 °C (42.8 °F).

Climate data for Nhulunbuy, Northern Territory, Australia (1975-1985 normals and extremes)
Month	Jan	Feb	Mar	Apr	May	Jun	Jul	Aug	Sep	Oct	Nov	Dec	Year
Record high °C (°F)	35.7 (96.3)	35.6 (96.1)	35.7 (96.3)	35.6 (96.1)	34.0 (93.2)	32.3 (90.1)	31.2 (88.2)	33.4 (92.1)	34.6 (94.3)	37.8 (100.0)	37.3 (99.1)	35.3 (95.5)	37.8 (100.0)
Mean daily maximum °C (°F)	32.0 (89.6)	31.7 (89.1)	31.5 (88.7)	31.5 (88.7)	30.5 (86.9)	29.5 (85.1)	28.6 (83.5)	29.0 (84.2)	29.8 (85.6)	30.9 (87.6)	31.9 (89.4)	32.4 (90.3)	30.8 (87.4)
Daily mean °C (°F)	28.8 (83.8)	28.5 (83.3)	28.2 (82.8)	27.8 (82.0)	26.9 (80.4)	25.5 (77.9)	24.6 (76.3)	24.5 (76.1)	25.5 (77.9)	26.9 (80.4)	28.5 (83.3)	29.2 (84.6)	27.1 (80.7)
Mean daily minimum °C (°F)	25.5 (77.9)	25.2 (77.4)	24.9 (76.8)	24.0 (75.2)	23.2 (73.8)	21.5 (70.7)	20.5 (68.9)	19.9 (67.8)	21.1 (70.0)	22.9 (73.2)	25.1 (77.2)	25.9 (78.6)	23.3 (74.0)
Record low °C (°F)	20.5 (68.9)	22.0 (71.6)	17.2 (63.0)	20.5 (68.9)	17.3 (63.1)	15.5 (59.9)	14.6 (58.3)	14.0 (57.2)	16.3 (61.3)	15.1 (59.2)	20.0 (68.0)	21.2 (70.2)	14.0 (57.2)
Average rainfall mm (inches)	235.9 (9.29)	229.1 (9.02)	269.0 (10.59)	232.3 (9.15)	78.6 (3.09)	20.0 (0.79)	12.7 (0.50)	4.3 (0.17)	5.0 (0.20)	10.0 (0.39)	29.8 (1.17)	186.4 (7.34)	1,313.1 (51.7)
Average rainy days (≥ 1 mm)	11.8	11.5	12.2	9.3	6.3	4.5	2.4	1.2	0.5	1.0	2.4	7.2	70.3
Average afternoon relative humidity (%)	72	73	73	68	65	61	61	61	61	62	66	69	66
Average dew point °C (°F)	24.6 (76.3)	24.7 (76.5)	24.4 (75.9)	23.2 (73.8)	21.9 (71.4)	19.7 (67.5)	18.9 (66.0)	19.4 (66.9)	20.4 (68.7)	21.8 (71.2)	23.7 (74.7)	24.5 (76.1)	22.3 (72.1)
