= Mungurrawuy Yunupingu =

Yolngu artist and leader

- Born: 1907
- Died: 1979 (aged 71–72)
- Occupations: Artist, land rights activist
- Known for: Bark painting Yirrkala Church Panels; Yirrkala bark petitions
- Children: Galarrwuy Yunupingu; Mandawuy Yunupingu; Barrupu Yunupingu; Dhopiya Yunupingu; Dorothy Djakanngu Yunupingu; Gulumbu Yunupingu; Djerrkngu Yunupingu; Nyapanyapa Yunupingu; Ranydjupi Yunupingu; Nancy Gaymala Yunupingu

Mungurrawuy Yunupingu (1907–1979), known mononymously among his people as Mungurrawuy, (Note: His name was variously written as Mangarawui, Mungurawi, Mungarawoi, Munggaraui, Mangarawoi, and Munggeraui, as the Yolngu language was not a written one and the spelling was based on how it sounded to an English-speaker.) was a Aboriginal Australian artist and leader of the Gumatj clan of the Yolngu people of northeastern Arnhem Land in the Northern Territory of Australia. He was known for his bark paintings and for his involvement in the Yirrkala church panels and the Yirrkala bark petitions of 1963.

== Early life ==
Mungurrawuy Yunupingu was born in 1907 at Melville Bay, on the Gove Peninsula in northeast Arnhem Land, (Note: Some sources say born c.1905.) of the Yirritja moiety.

== Art career ==
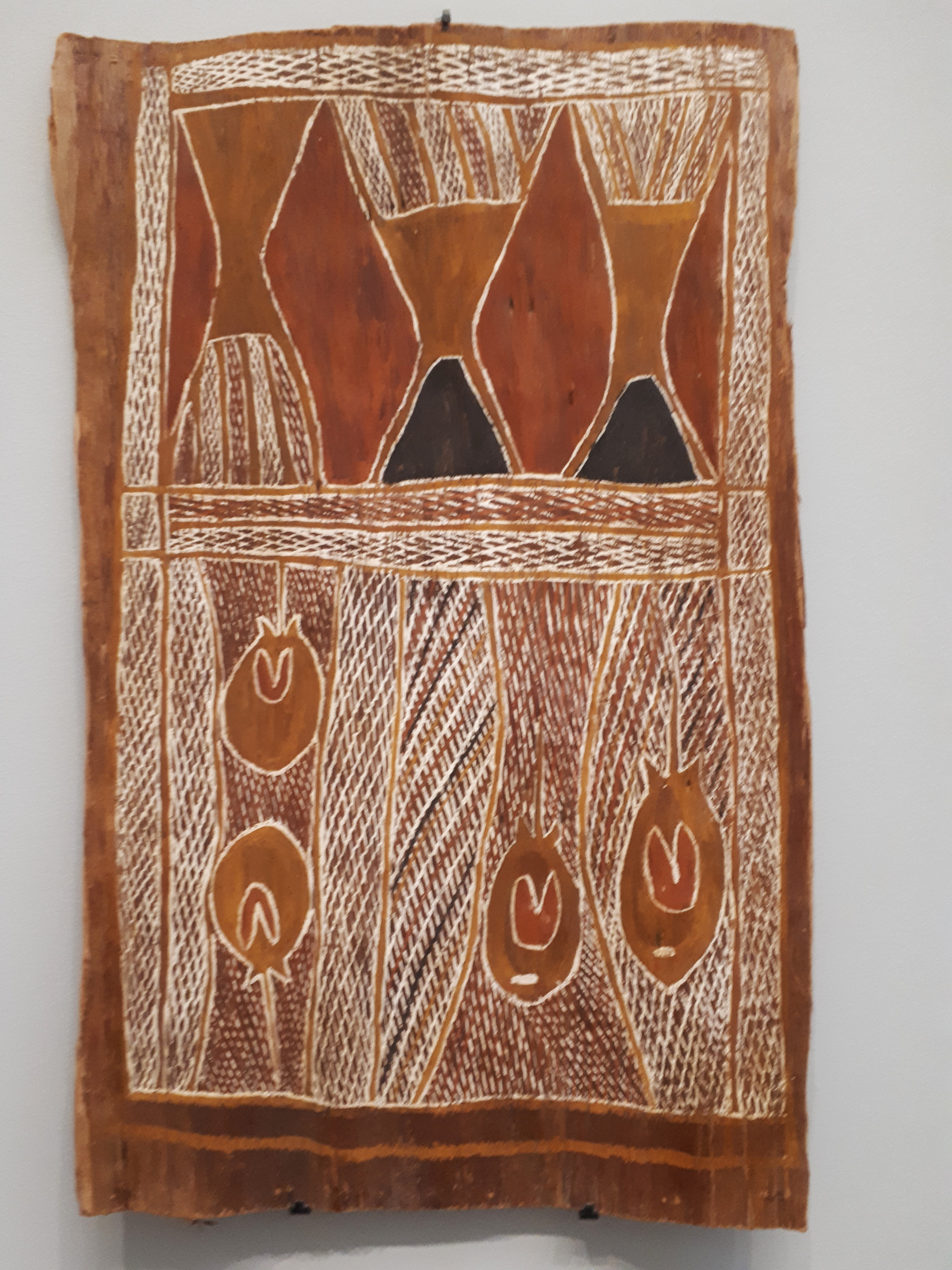
The Sea and the Sky (1948)

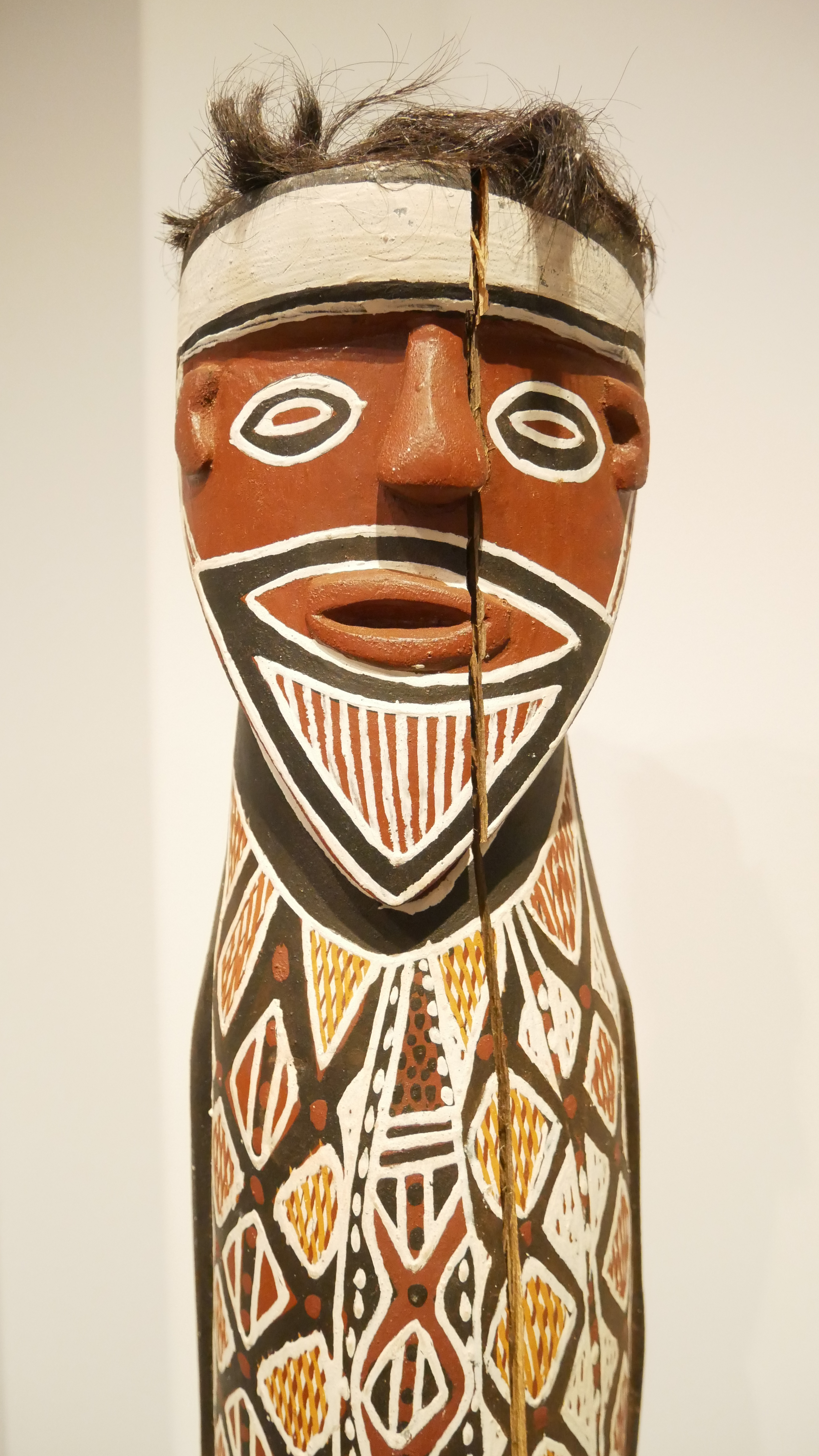
Nureri, the sacred fire ancestor（before 1970）

Mungurrawuy was one of the most significant painters of his time. He was the most prominent Gumatj artist active during the mission days in Arnhem Land.

During his career as an artist, Mungurrawuy drew upon ancestral narratives in his paintings and wood carvings. He is known to be one of the artists who spearheaded the "episodic" manner of painting, where stories are painted in a series of panels to show how they unfold over time. While he painted traditional stories and concepts, his innovation greatly diverged from common single-panelled narrative paintings. His painting style can be described as a well-balanced mix of colours dominated by the use of yellow ochre. The human figures he painted tend to be broad-shouldered and have elongated bodies.

Mungurrawuy was involved in most of the significant moments in Yolngu art history of the twentieth century. He produced a number of fine crayon drawings for the anthropologist Ronald Berndt after he arrived in Yirrkala in 1946 and in 1948 created a large number of paintings for Charles Mountford and the American-Australian Scientific Expedition to Arnhem Land.

Between 1959 and 1962, Mungurrawuy produced some of his largest and most significant works for the collector-donor Stuart Scougall, who along with the Art Gallery of New South Wales' assistant director, Tony Tuckson, commissioned a series of monumental bark paintings from the artists of Yirrkala to lay out the major ancestral narratives of the Yolngu clans. Scougall described these works as "the first time such a collection of bark paintings was made in a pictorial ballad sequence whereas other collections have been essentially sporadic, of a piecemeal nature." The majority of these works are now held in the Art Gallery of New South Wales, however a small number of works commissioned by Scougall can be found in other collections around the world, including the Saint Louis Art Museum. Mungurrawuy also established a strong relationship with the collector and art dealer Jim Davidson.

Aside from ancestral stories, he also produced several paintings depicting the interaction of Yolngu with the Makassan people, who were seafarers that seasonally visited the northern Arnhem Land coast to harvest trepang, or sea cucumbers. It is thought that Mungurrawuy was quite young when he last interacted with Makassans, since the Australian Government banned other countries from using the resources found on Australian coasts in 1906. However, he did remember meeting Makassan people and for Berndt's crayon-drawing commission, he drew his famous Port of Macassar.

In the late 1960s, Mungurrawuy was commissioned to produce a series of painting on masonite board to commemorate events involving the ELDO tracking station at Gurlkurla by Geoff Woods, who was employed as the base manager at a nearby weapons research centre. One work of these works, Space Tracking Station (1967), was subsequently acquired by the South Australian Museum and included in the exhibition Dreamings: The Art of Aboriginal Australia at the Asia Society Galleries in New York City in 1988. Another work, Man Landing on the Moon (1969), which depicts Neil Armstrong and Buzz Aldrin's Moon landing is held in the Kluge-Ruhe Aboriginal Art Collection of the University of Virginia.

== Other roles ==
Mungurrawuy was a senior cultural leader of the Gumatj clan in Yirrkala, in the 1960s, and known mononymously as Mungurrawuy.

On 18 February 1963, the Australian Prime Minister Robert Menzies announced the opening of bauxite mines in the Arnhem Land reserve without consulting Yolngu leaders. Director of Welfare Harry Giese flew in briefly on 16 May 1968 and address the people, standing on a 44-gallon drum, but did not explain anything to them about what it meant to them. Mungurraway and Dhuwa elder Mawalan Marika dictated a letter which was translated and transcribed for them, to Giese and Paul Hasluck (Minister for Territories in the Menzies government), asking for various items in return for working on their country, including housing, furniture, toilets, and trucks. Furious at the lack of transparency the Australian Government held for the Yolngu people, clan elders came together to paint the famous Yirrkala Church Panels, which documented the Yolngu claim to the land through ancestral stories. Consisting of two 4 m (13 ft) sheets of masonite, eight elders of the Dhuwa moiety (including Mawalan Marika, Wandjuk Marika and Mithinarri Gurruwiwi) painted one sheet with their major ancestral narratives and clan designs, and eight elders of the Yirritja moiety, including Mungurrawuy, Birrikitji Gumana and Narritjin Maymuru, painted the other sheet with Yirritja designs. This was the first significant political claim to the land by Aboriginal Australians, accompanied by physical documentation in the form of the decorated panels to be displayed in the Yirrkala church.

Their efforts to engage the government in discussion about the use of their land were not met with success. Mungurrawuy called all the clans together for a week-long bunggul, to be held on his Country at Gulkula. This was a significant and rare event, called to honour the animals and the land, to remind people where they stood, and to engender unity among the clans. This would lead to the creation of the Yirrkala bark petitions of August 1963 (to which Mungurrawuy was a signatory) and the high court case Milirrpum v Nabalco Pty Ltd (Gove land rights case), which ruled against the claimants, but was a significant milestone in the history of Indigenous land rights in Australia.

The Yirrkala panels were discarded by the church in 1974, but were salvaged by the Buku-Larrnggay Mulka Centre in 1978. On 27 February 1998 they were unveiled by prime minister John Howard, and were described by Yolŋu leaders as "Title Deeds which establish the legal tenure for each of our traditional clan estates".

== Personal life and death ==
In 1978, H. C. "Nugget" Coombs, the former Governor of the Reserve Bank of Australia, described Mungurrawuy as "an impressive figure – tall, massive, bearded, powerful. He has seven wives and thirty children. These, no doubt, are measures of his status in his community". Historian Clare Wright, in her 2024 book about the Yirrkala bark petitions, reports that he had 11 wives and 43 children by 1963, at the age of 58. His sons included Djalaliŋba, Garamali, and Galarrwuy, and one of his daughters was Djerrkŋu. Garamali was his eldest son, "a colourful character who always wore a cape, and often a top hat", and liked to carry a machete as well as a spear. He was killed by a Djapu man in a relatively rare clan dispute some time after the bark petitions had been presented to Parliament. Other offspring included Mandawuy, Barrupu, Dhopiya, Djakanngu (Dorothy), Gulumbu, Nyapanyapa, Ranydjupi, and Nancy Gaymala Yunupingu. Many of his children would go on to have significant careers as artists, musicians, and political leaders.

Mungurrawuy did not speak English, but his son Galarrwuy took a keen interest in the proceedings around the mining claim, and acted as interpreter for his father. Father and son went to great lengths to protect a sacred banyan tree on Gumatj country, successfully, when Nabalco arrived to build their aluminium plant. Yirrkala mission teacher Ron Croxford reported that it was Mungurrawuy who had taught him the depth of the Yolngu connection to their land: "Mungurrawuy didn't just own the land, he was the land".

He died in northeast Arnhem Land in 1979.

== Collections ==
- Art Gallery of New South Wales
- Art Gallery of South Australia
- Kluge-Ruhe Aboriginal Art Collection of the University of Virginia
- National Museum of Australia
- Saint Louis Art Museum
- Berndt Museum of the University of Western Australia

== Significant exhibitions ==
- 1965: Australian Aboriginal Bark Paintings 1912-1964, Walker Art Gallery, Liverpool, England
- 1988: Dreamings: The Art of Aboriginal Australia, Asia Society Galleries, New York City
- 1993-4: Aratjara: Art of the First Australians, Europe, 1993-1994: Kunstsammlung Nordrhein-Westfalen, Düsseldorf, Germany; Hayward Gallery, London, England; and the Louisiana Museum of Modern Art, Humlebæk, Denmark
- 2013-14: Yirrkala Drawings, Art Gallery of New South Wales, Sydney; Berndt Museum of Anthropology, University of Western Australia, Perth; Charles Darwin University Art Gallery, Charles Darwin University, Darwin
- 2013-2020: Old Masters: Australia's Great Bark Artists, National Museum of Australia, Canberra; National Taiwan Museum, Taipei; Sichuan Museum, Chengdu; Shenzhen Museum, Shenzhen; Shanghai Natural History Museum, Shanghai; National Museum of China, Beijing
