= Yirrkala Church Panels =

Aboriginal Australian works of art and historical documents

The Yirrkala Church Panels are important works of art created by various Yolŋu artists for the new church on the Methodist mission at Yirrkala, on the Gove Peninsula in western Arnhem Land, Northern Territory, Australia, which opened in June 1963. The two painted panels, comprising the creation stories of the various Yolŋu peoples in the area, are a rare example of traditional religions being integrated into a Christian church. Their historical significance lies in the collaboration of a number of Yolŋu artists from the various clans in the region to produce the panels as assertion of their sovereignty, in the face of a mining project which would take their land without consultation. They were therefore also political art, and preceded the Yirrkala bark petitions, which were presented to the Australian Parliament in August 1963. The church panels are now housed in the Buku-Larrnggay Mulka Centre at Yirrkala.

== History ==
The mission (a type of Aboriginal reserve) at Yirrkala was run by the Methodist Overseas Mission (MOM) from its foundation in 1923 until 1974. The clan groups of both Yolŋu moieties, the Dhuwa (of which there are 9) and Yirritja (7), were living on the mission. Superintendent Edgar Wells was in charge of the mission from around 1961, when he moved there with his wife Annie, until around 1974.

In late 1962 and early 1963, artists and elders of several clans spanning both moieties got together to create the artworks for the church, in a collaborative effort in which the non-Indigenous mission staff also participated. The idea originated with clan elder Narritjin Maymuru, who, with the blessing of Edgar and Ann, invited local elders to paint "something of their own choosing" for the church. Edgar Wells knew that by contributing their own work and stories in the church, they would have a greater sense of belonging; for the Yolŋu elders, they knew that their own system of law and lore (maḏayin) remained continued to exist alongside Christianity, which was therefore not a threat to their culture. To them, it was a more recent story that integrated into their much older narratives, and in addition, help to bridge the communication gap with the Australian Government, which was a newcomer in the region (although not every clan participated; some of the more distant ones did not send a delegate artist).

Wells was displeased at the government's unilateral decision to allow bauxite mining on the Gove Peninsula without consulting the local people, and wanted to encourage them to assert their nationhood. Annie Wells had a particularly privileged role as cultural attaché, and the artists of both moieties asked that nobody ask what they were painting until the panels were complete. Only she and Edgar were allowed to watch the artists working under the shade of the (old) church roof. Annie was tasked with documenting the men's stories, very carefully and painstakingly to ensure that there were no errors made. The panels were a collective statement, telling the creation stories of each group, with no hierarchy - they were parallel, and equal. Historian Clare Wright described the designs on the panels thus:

A collective statement produced through a consultative process of representation based on time-honoured legal and philosophical tenets. A statement depicting the world-making, world-defining, actions of the wangarr, uniting the clans with each other in a shared purpose and with the cosmos in time andspace that proclaimed: we are here, we are mapped onto this land, the land constitutes us. An act of governance and a statement of sovereignty.

The two masonite panels, each 12 ft (3.7 m) high and 4 ft (1.2 m) wide, were painted using ochres and paintbrushes made of human hair, and installed in the church in March 1963. When the church opened on 23 June 1963, the panels were displayed behind the altar table at the top end, facing the congregation, on either side of a large plain central panel which had nothing but a simple cross on it. The painted panels were slightly to the rear of the central panel, and there were two further plain panels on either side of them. The designs on the panels are traditionally used in body painting and ceremony to distinguish the various clans.

The panels were pieces of political art, by which the Yolngu stated their connection to the land on which the church was built, and were a forerunner to the Yirrkala bark petitions, which were presented to the Australian Parliament in August 1963.

== Artists ==
The left-hand panel was painted under the direction of senior Dhuwa elder Mawalan Marika, and included work by his son, Wandjuk Marika, as well as his brother Mathaman Marika, Mithinarri Gurruwiwi, Larrtjanŋa Ganambarr, Mutitjpuy Munuŋgurr, and others. Yirritji elder Birrikitji Gumana oversaw the painting of the right-hand panel, which was painted by members of the Gumana, Wunuŋmurra, Yunupiŋu, and Maymuru families, including Yanggarriny Wunungmurra. The eight artists of each moiety asked not to be questioned about what they were painting until the works were complete.

The artists who contributed to painting the panels, representing their respective languages and Country, were listed by Ann Wells as follows:

- Dhuwa:
  - Mawalan and
  - Mathaman Marika (Rirratjingu language/clan, Yirrkala Country)
  - Wandjuk Marika and
  - Gunguyama (Jambapuingu language/clan, Dalpiyalpi Country)
  - Larrtjina (Ngaimil language/clan, Darapangan Country)
  - Mutitpui (Djapu language/clan, Damalmirri Country)
  - Mithinarri Gurruwiwi (Galpu language/clan, Mamarin Country)
  - Munaparriwi (Marakulu language/clan, Dhurili Country)
- Yirritja:
  - Birrikitji Gumana and
  - Gawarin (Duluwangu language/clan, Narrkala Country)
  - Mungurrawuy and
  - Jarrkujarrku (Gumatj language/clan, Dulbungu-Rrayun Country)
  - Yanggarriny Wunungmurra (Duluwangu language/clan, Nyangbu Country)
  - Watjun (Gumatj language/clan, Yarrawirri Country)
  - Narritjin Maymuru and
  - Nanyin (Manggalili language/clan, Birrlung Country)

== Description ==
The designs feature the creator beings of the two moieties, Djang'kawu and Banaitja, depicting the "everywhen" concept of time as part of Wangarr (aka The Dreaming), as well as local flora and fauna. For two clans that had not moved to the mission, the Munyuku and Madarrpa clans, who lived on missions further south, permission was given by clan leaders for secondary rights-holders to paint their stories.

Ann Wells provides detailed descriptions of the artwork on the panels and each story represented by each painting, in her book This is Their Dreaming: Legends of the Panels of Aboriginal Art in the Yirrkala Church, published in 1971.

According to anthropologist Howard Morphy, the artists "decided how they would use their art in communicating with outsiders and how their sacred law could be presented in public contexts", and wanted to "show that Yolngu had their own sacred heritage and to emphasize its connection to land and land ownership... Visitors to the church would be able to see the ways in which the paintings mapped their rights in land and also apprehend the sense in which land was a sacred endowment".

== Significance ==
Before they came together at the mission, each clan regarded themselves as a separate people. With the adoption of the term "Yolngu" by anthropologists, they saw it as a useful place to assert their collective sovereignty, akin to modern nation states, and the church panels expressed this interpretation. The designs express the two "distinct but complementary" moieties, Dhuwa and Yirritja, each represented by one of the panels, and their relationships to one another and the cosmos. The key stories of most of the clans appear in a section of each panel. Every Yolŋu person inherits some stories from both moieties, as their mothers and fathers are always from different ones.

According to art historian, academic, and critic Terry Smith, "The most historically notable aspect of the Yirrkala Church Panels is that this was the first time (at least as known to balanda) that the clans came together on such a scale to create a work of art with a single, focused, shared purpose". They were also a declaration of place and sovereignty; "The overall narrative in both panels is that of the creation of Yolŋu lands, those subsequently owned by the clans". The paintings also introduced Yolŋu religious iconography into a Christian environment, showing that there was a Yolngu sacred heritage already in existence.

Also notable is that leaders of this project not only became involved in the subsequent fight for Yolngu autonomy, but also became leaders in the development of the subsequent bark painting movement.

Kim Beazley Sr, a Western Australian Labor Party MP, after seeing the church panels suggested that similar paintings could be incorporated into a petition to Parliament opposing the mining. Following his suggestion, the famous bark petitions were created and presented to the Australian Parliament later that year, tabled on 14 August and 28 August. On 2 October 1963, after the Select Committee hearing that had been held in response to the bark petitions, a group of MPs, along with other distinguished visitors, officials, and reporters, visited Yirrkala and the Yirrkala Youth Choir sang for them in the church, with the panels on display. While the petitions were unsuccessful in that they did not prevent the mining, the publicity in the media served to raise public awareness of issues around Indigenous land rights and native title, which had an impact later.

== Current location ==
The Yirrkala panels were discarded by the church in 1974, but were salvaged by the Buku-Larrnggay Mulka Centre, located in Yirrkala, in 1978. On 27 February 1998, housed in a specially-built space in the Mulka Museum, they were unveiled by then prime minister John Howard, and were described by Yolŋu leaders as "Title Deeds which establish the legal tenure for each of our traditional clan estates". European Museum Technology designed and fabricated special large showcases for the panels in their Melbourne facility, which they transported to Yirrkala. They are held in a cyclone-proof surroundings.

As of December 2025 they are still held in the museum, which describes the panels as "one of the most important artworks in Australian art history". Will Stubbs, coordinator of Buku, has called the artworks "the Yolŋu world's Sistine Chapel".

== In popular media ==
Facsimiles of the panels were commissioned as part of the film set for the feature film Yolngu Boy (2000), and created in 1999 by Yolngu artists Nancy Gaymala Yunupingu, Gulumbu Yunupingu (both daughters of Mungurrawuy), and Dhuwarrwarr Marika.
