= Yanggarriny Wunungmurra =

Australian Aboriginal artist

- Born: circa 1932; Bayapula (Caledon Bay)
- Died: 14 January 2003
- Other names: Yangarin, Yaŋgarriny
- Known for: Indigenous Australian art, bark painting, Yirrkala Church Panels
- Children: Nawurapu Wunungmurra (son), Djirrirra Wunungmurra (daughter)
- Parent(s): Nyepanga Wunungmurra (father), Gangadiwuy Wanambi (mother)
- Awards: National Aboriginal and Torres Strait Islander Art Award, 1997

Yanggarriny Wunungmurra (1932–2003) was an artist, yidaki player and leader of the Dhalwangu clan of the Yolngu people of northeast Arnhem Land in the Northern Territory of Australia.

== Early life ==
Yanggarriny Wunungmurra was born in northeast Arnhem Land in 1932.

== Career ==
In 1963 he Yanggarriny one of the major contributors to the Yirritja side of the Yirrkala Church Panels. A few months later, he was one of four painters selected by consensus to paint designs on the Yirrkala bark petitions, which were presented to the Australian Parliament in August 1963, asserting Yolngu sovereignty over the land around Yirrkala, after the Commonwealth Government had allowed a mining company to develop bauxite mining on their traditional lands.

Wunungmurra was also a celebrated yidaki player. Alan Brissenden and Keith Glennon describe him as "a meticulous, and complete, artist, not only a virtuoso of the didgeridoo, but also a fine singer, dancer and bark painter".

== Recognition ==
Considered one of the seminal figures in the Yolngu bark painting movement, Wunungmurra's work is included in most major collections of Aboriginal Australian art.

In 1997, Wunungmurra's work Gangan was awarded first prize in the National Aboriginal and Torres Strait Islander Art Award.

== Yanggarriny Wunungmurra v. Peter Stripes Fabrics ==
In 1983, Wunungmurra was the first Aboriginal artist to have his copyright recognized in an Australian court. Wunungmurra utilized the support of the recently formed Aboriginal Artists Association to take legal action against the copyright violation. The case, Yanggarriny Wunungmurra v. Peter Stripes Fabrics was won against the Australian Copyright Act 1968, which had previously not considered Aboriginal Australian designs to be "original" and thereby protected under copyright in Australia.

In 1981, Wunungmurra took Peter Stripes Fabrics to the Australian Federal Court for unauthorised use of his painting, Long-necked Freshwater Tortoises by the Fish Trap at Gaanan (1975). The case hinged on whether the painting constituted "traditional designs" or whether it constituted the original work of the artist. In his statement to the court, Wunungmurra noted that he had learned the design from Gawirrin Gumana's father (Birrikitji Gumana) and that both men had the authority to paint the design. However, he also maintained that anyone could tell that the painting was his by the way the tortoise was drawn, which was like his signature. Elizabeth Burns Coleman argues that "the case was won by the stress that was placed on Wunungmurra's additions to and differences from traditional design... As such, the argument emphasized what was original in his work, rather than what was traditional".

== Death and family ==
Yanggarriny died in 2003. Before his death, he had passed on his knowledge of his own clan's saltwater imagery to Wukun Wanambi, who had been unable to learn of his own culture due to his father, Mithili Wanambi, having died in 1981 prior to sharing this knowledge.

Yanggarriny's son, Nawurapu Wunungmurra, is also an artist. His work is on display in the Art Gallery of South Australia in Adelaide.

His daughter, Djirrirra Wunuŋmurra (born 1968), is also an artist, who has been featured in several major exhibitions and in solo exhibitions, in Australia and internationally. She won the TOGA Northern Territory Contemporary Art Award in 2008, and in 2012 was winner of the Best Bark Painting at the 29th National Aboriginal & Torres Strait Islander Art Award.

== Collections ==
- Art Gallery of New South Wales
- Art Gallery of South Australia
- The British Museum
- Museum and Art Gallery of the Northern Territory
- National Gallery of Victoria
- National Museum of Australia

== Significant exhibitions ==
- 1995: Miny'tji Buku-Larrnggay: Paintings from the East. National Gallery of Victoria, Melbourne.
- 1999-2001: Saltwater: Yirrkala Bark Paintings of Sea Country. Drill Hall Gallery, Australian National University, Canberra; John Curtin Gallery, Curtin University, Perth; Australian National Maritime Museum, Sydney; Museum of Modern Art Heide; Melbourne; Araluen Art Centre, Alice Springs.
