= Yirrkala bark petitions =

Aboriginal Australian land claims

The Yirrkala bark petitions (Yolngu: Näku Dhäruk) are a set of four petitions prepared by leaders of the Yolngu people, an Aboriginal Australian people of Arnhem Land in the Northern Territory, of which two were presented in the Australian Parliament in August 1963. The petitions asserted that the Yolngu people owned the land around Yirrkala on the Gove Peninsula, after discovering that the federal government had granted mining rights to a series of private mining companies since the late 1950s, and claims were being staked out in 1963 by Gove Bauxite Corporation. They were supported by Yirrkala mission superintendent Edgar Wells and his wife Annie, along with various Aboriginal rights activists and politicians, including Kim Beazley Sr. and Gordon Bryant. The petitions were successful in that they instigated the establishment of a government committee to look into their grievances, but ultimately, the mining went ahead.

After a group of Yolngu people took the government to court in 1968 over the matter, in 1971 the court decided that the ordinances and mining leases were valid, and that the Yolngu people were not able to establish their native title at common law, in a decision known as the Milirrpum decision, or the Gove land rights case. However, the actions of the people in presenting the bark petitions eventually led to the recognition of Indigenous rights in Commonwealth law.

The petitions are significant as political art, following the Yirrkala Church Panels a few months earlier, and were the first traditional documents prepared by Indigenous Australians recognised by the Australian Parliament. The acceptance by Parliament of the traditional form of bark painting juxtaposed with European-style text typed on paper marked the tacit acknowledgement of the existence of Yolngu law. They have been likened to England's Magna Carta of 1215, setting out the rights of Indigenous peoples in Australia.

== Background and overview ==
The Commonwealth Government administered the Northern Territory from World War II until the passing of the Northern Territory (Self-Government) Act 1978. In 1952, after geological exploration was carried out on the Gove Peninsula, discovering large deposits of bauxite, Territories Minister Paul Hasluck announced a change in policy, "to extract the mineral wealth of the Territory". In 1958, the Commonwealth Aluminium Corporation (Comalco) was issued a mining lease (SML1) to prospect land at Melville Bay adjacent to Yirrkala mission. In 1960, the mining lease had been transferred to the British Aluminium Company. Hasluck granted additional prospecting rights to Duval Holdings, which then brought in French company Pechiney, which created an Australian subsidiary, who were granted three new leases (SML1, 2, & 3) to the area around the mission, encroaching on its land. In 1962 Samuel Benson Dickinson had been appointed field manager of the subsidiary, called Gove Bauxite Corporation (later renamed GOMINCO), and advocated a "vigorous mineral development policy". He had begun staking out an area for exploration, announcing plans to set up mining headquarters at Gunipinya, near the mission. Gunipinya was the site of a freshwater spring, and a sacred site.

On 13 March 1963, the government excised over 300 km^{2} (120 sq mi) of land from the Aboriginal reserve on Arnhem Land, in order to mine bauxite that had been discovered there. After GOMINCO started staking out its claims around the Yirrkala mission, which was run by superintendent Edgar Wells, along with his wife Ann, the extent of the development was challenged by the traditional owners of the land, the Gumatj and Rirratjiŋu clans of Yolngu peoples, as they had not been consulted. Wali Wunungmurra (Wawunggmarra), one of the 12 signatories to the petitions, said that the Yolngu became aware of people prospecting for minerals in the Gove Peninsula area in the late 1950s, later discovering that mining leases had been taken out over "a considerable area of our traditional land".

The people of Yirrkala mission, which was run by the Methodist Overseas Mission, created the Yirrkala Church Panels in March 1963. These were pieces of political art in which they stated their claim to the land around them, which were mounted in the new church at Yirrkala ready for its opening on 23 June 1963.

Edgar Wells persuaded Dickinson to attend a meeting with around 60 Yolngu people, along with his French colleague Silve. Further meetings with Dickinson ensued, but the matter was not resolved. On 16 July 1963, Labor politicians Gordon Bryant (from Victoria) Kim Beazley Sr. (from Western Australia) visited Yirrkala, sponsored by the Federal Council for Aboriginal Advancement. John Jago had alerted him – too late – to the fact that that public notices had been placed in the NT News on 22 June by Dickinson on behalf of the mining company, "in language incomprehensible to anyone but a surveyor". The cut-off date for objections was 19 July, with the application hearing scheduled for 16 August.

The idea of a painted bark petition was suggested by Beazley, after Ann Wells had typed up a letter created by a Wandjuk Marika and other literate members of the mission. Five brothers of the Rirratjiŋu clan, Mawalan Marika, Mathaman Marika, Milirrpum Marika, Dhunggala Marika, and Dadaynga "Roy" Marika led the thirteen clans, being traditional owners of the land in question. Wandjuk Marika (son of Mawalan) helped to draft the bark petitions, of which two of the four original petitions, which were signed by nine men and three women, were sent to the Australian House of Representatives. The petitions were written in a standardised Yolngu script developed by the missionary Beulah Lowe, based on Yolngu Matha languages, (Note: One source suggests that it was based on the Gupapuyngu language a Yirritja dialect of the Dhuwal language.) together with an English translation. They were tabled on 14 August and 28 August 1963.

They are called bark petitions because, although typed on paper, they were framed by traditional bark paintings. The typing was done on a Remington typewriter by author Ann E. Wells, wife of Rev. Edgar Wells, who was superintendent of the Yirrkala Methodist Mission at the time. Supporters included by Ron Croxford, head of Yirrkala School, his wife Margaret, who taught there, as well as Edgar and Ann Wells, and MPs Gordon Bryant and Kim Beazley Sr. Galarrwuy Yunupingu (1948–2023), son of Mungurrawuy, was a teenager at the time, but could speak several Yolngu languages as well as English fluently. In 2020, in the process of researching for her 2024 book Näku Dhäruk: The Bark Petitions: How the People of Yirrkala Changed the course of Australian democracy, historian Clare Wright was told by Galarrwuy that the Yolngu name for the documents was Näku Dhäruk. Näku (pronounced "nah-koo") refers to the bark of a particular species of stringybark tree, known as Gadayka. Dhäruk (pronounced "dah-rook"), means "the word" or "message".

== The petitions: content and people ==
The bark petitions asserted that the Yolngu people owned the land and protested the Commonwealth Government's granting of mining rights to Gove Bauxite Corporation of land excised from the Arnhem Aboriginal Land reserve. The paintings on bark were designed to frame the petitions, and not simply decorative, but a frame of reference; "like the Church Panels, a public assertion of Yolngu ideology and spirituality". The barks were painted in the church overnight. Ann Wells made notes about everything related to the petitions.

=== Painters ===
Those who assisted in painting the designs on the bark on which the petitions were mounted were chosen by consensus, the "right way", the Yolngu political process. The four painters were :

- Narritjin Maymuru (Mangalili / Yirritja, aged 41)
- Yanggarriny Wunungmurra (Dawlangu / Yirritja, 31)
- Mutitjpuy Mununggurr (Djapu / Dhuwa, 31) (Note: For name, see these refs.)
- Rrikin (Gumatch / Yirritja, 31), known for his singing, dancing, mime, and mastery of the yidaki

The first three had also been selected to paint the church panels.

=== Words and signatories ===
Each petition has the same words, written first in English and then one of the Yolngu Matha languages. The text of the Bark Petitions is available online. It begins by explaining that around 500 people are residents of the land which has been excised for mining without proper explanation or consultation with the residents. It goes on to explain the importance of their land, and finishes, in the final two points, with two requests:

- 7. And they humbly pray that the Honourable the House of Representatives will appoint a Committee, accompanied by competent interpreters, to hear the views of the people of Yirrkala before permitting the excision of this land.
- 8. They humbly pray that no arrangements be entered into with any company which will destroy the livelihood and independence of the Yirrkala people.

The petitions stated that "the land in question has been hunting and food gathering land for the Yirrkala tribes from time immemorial" and "that places sacred to the Yirrkala people, as well as vital to their livelihood are in the excised land". They expressed the petitioners' "fear that their needs and interests will be completely ignored as they have been ignored in the past". The petitions called on the House of Representatives to "appoint a Committee, accompanied by competent interpreters, to hear the views of the people of Yirrkala before permitting the excision" of the land for the mine and to ensure "that no arrangements be entered into with any company which will destroy the livelihood and independence of the Yirrkala people". Thus, the petitions are the first formal assertion of native title, or Indigenous land rights in Australia. What is conveyed by the artists in the drawings is equally significant to the words, expressing their long association with the land, and their laws which originated during creation, or wangarr. The designs are "an interface between the ground, its spiritual essence, and specific groups of people".

The first petition was signed by 12 people at the mission (those who were able to write). The petitioners had to be able to sign their names, and had to have the correct authority to sign for the other Yolngu people. Those selected to sign were:

- Milirrpum (at age 36, the eldest signatory; brother of Mawalan and Roy Dayanga), representing the Rirratjiŋu clan
- Djalaliŋba Manunu, aged 27, a Gumatj man raised by Mungurrawuy
- Larrakan (24), a Gumatj woman of the Yirritja moiety, daughter of Watjung (Church Panels painter); worked in the home of teacher Ron Croxford and his wife Marg
- Raiyin(i) (24), Larrakan's brother (Yirritja)
- Daymbalipu (29), Djapu man, Dhuwa; worked with teacher Ron Croxford as a teaching assistant
- Dundiwuy Wanambi (27)
- Dhuŋgala (23), brother of Daymbalipu; apprentice builder, who helped build the new church
- Djayila (29), Djapu man, husband of Larrakan
- Manunu (21), Dhalwangu woman, Yirritja, who had completed her education at the mission school
- Nyabilingu (26), daughter of Nanyin Maymuru (Note: Nanyin was the younger brother of Narritjin; both engaged strongly with balanda in the fight for their rights, and used art as a way to persuade others of the value of their culture) Yirritja, niece of Narritjin (Church Panels painter)
- Wulanybuma Wununggumurra (18), Dhalwangu man, brother of Manunu
- Wawunggmarra (18), brother of Nyabilingu

The brothers Daymbalipu and Dhuŋgala were the sons of Dhangatji, but were both raised by the warrior-leader and artist Wonggu. They were from Caledon Bay area, but became integral to the life of the mission.

Dundiwuy Wanambi (born 1936) later worked with ethnographic filmmaker Ian Dunlop on the Yirrkala Film Project, a series of 11 films about the Yolngu people. He was the paternal uncle of artist Wukun Wanambi, and therefore his classificatory "father".

Dhuŋgala Munuŋgurr, an artist was the last surviving signatory to the bark petition, and in 2022 was the recipient of a Yothu Yindi Foundation Garma Festival Yolngu hero award. He died in March 2024.

== Presentation to Parliament ==
=== Preparation ===
The four petitions were wrapped carefully by Ann Edgar, addressed to Prime Minister Robert Menzies, Leader of the Opposition A. A. Calwell, Gordon Bryant, and Kim Beazley, and put on the mail plane, with postage paid out of her own money. Beazley confirmed arrival on 29 July, and suggested that they be presented by Jock Nelson and Ken Waters, an independent Legislative Council member for Arnhem Land. (Note: A ward of the City of Darwin is named after Waters.)

=== Presentations ===
The first petition was presented to Parliament on 14 August 1963 by Labor politician Jock Nelson. Minister for Territories Paul Hasluck raised doubts about its authenticity, which angered not only Gordon Bryant, but the Yolngu people at the mission. Ann Wells prepared a shorter (six-point) paper petition, excluding mention of the Larrakia people of Darwin. However the people had also prepared a second petition with the same wording but different designs around it, which was thumbprinted by elders representing the various clans as well as being signed by the previous signatories. Tribune, the official newspaper of the Communist Party of Australia reported that the land-grab was related to Menzies' policy of assimilation, as, if they are to be "wiped out as a separate people" through this policy, the government reasons that they would have no need of land.

On 28 August 1963, Leader of the Opposition Arthur Calwell read the English version of the second petition, passed to him by Kim Beazley, who also moved that the petition in its entirety be printed in Hansard in both Yolngu and English languages. Ann Wells had, on unknown advice, typed up another copy of the petitions, but with only six points instead of eight (excluding mention of the Larrakia people of Darwin), and sent it to Canberra on 24 August, accompanied by 31 thumbprints. (Note: The Canberra Times reported 33.) It is not known who advised her to remove the two points, but the reason for the thumbprints was Paul Hasluck having expressed scepticism about the representativeness and status of the signatories (who were young, and of few Yolngu people at that point able to write). Beazley however presented the original (second) 8-point bark petition, and also the three pages of thumbprints. The petition was recorded in Hansard, and 800 copies were printed and sold to the public, titled "Petition form certain people of Yirrkala relating to the excision of land from the Aboriginal Reserve in Arnhem Land". Owing to civil rights rallies commencing in the United States at the same time, the presentation of the petitions did not get a lot of international press coverage.

On 28 August Beazley also moved to establish a seven-member parliamentary committee to investigate the people's grievances, which was agreed to. Also on this date, Calwell said that he would talk to Menzies about establishing an institute of Aboriginal studies (which was already under way, and was established as the Australian Institute of Aboriginal Studies in 1964).

=== Committee and report ===
The federal government established a select committee known as the House of Representatives Select Committee on Grievances of the Yirrkala Aborigines, Arnhem Land Reserve, chaired by Liberal MP Roger Dean. The other committee members were Charles Barnes; Kim Beazley; Gordon Bryant; Don Chipp; Bert Kelly; and Jock Nelson; a mix of Labor and Liberal voices.

In its report on 29 October 1963, the Select Committee recommended that the Yirrkala people should be compensated for the loss of their traditional occupancy, by way of (1) land grant; (2) payment of at least the first A$300,000 received in mining royalties; and (3) direct monetary compensation, even though Aboriginal land rights were not expressly recognised under Northern Territory laws. It also recommended protection of their sacred sites on the land, and - most importantly, recommendations 79 and 80: that there should be a 10-year House of Reps standing committee to examine from time to time the conditions of the Yirrkala people and the carrying out of the recommendations, which would be empowered to speak directly to the Yirrkala people.

Gordon Bryant was satisfied by the reception of the petitions in Parliament, and the establishment of the Select Committee. He also realised that the enquiry had shown the Northern Territory Administration to be derelict in its duties, with Harry Giese specifically implicated. The committee's conclusions meant that Aboriginal people in the NT could no longer be viewed as a proprietary interest of the Administration, but as citizens of Australia, to whom and for whom the Australian Parliament was responsible. The report also acknowledged land rights, giving advice on native title for the first time in Australian history. According to Clare Wright, Giese was in a sense "the fall guy", as it was Hasluck's department that should have negotiated the mining agreements properly in the first place. It was also a loss of face for the MOM board, headed by Gribble. On 11 November 1963, the MOM board wrote to say that Wells had acted improperly, claiming that he had not consulted them about his opposition to their decisions before acting and speaking to the press, and that he would be transferred to Milingimbi mission (where he had previously done a stint), starting on 1 January 1964. Despite others intervening on his behalf, including John Jago, the church stood firm. Roy Dadaynga arranged a farewell bunggul for Edgar and Ann Wells three days after Christmas, and the couple left on the mail plane on 1 January 1964 (although he refused the posting to Milingimbi).

=== Result ===
In 1964, the Menzies government granted the central SML1 lease to Nabalco to develop mines. In 1965, after GOMINCO had pulled out of its involvement in Gove, its leases (SMLs 2, 3, and 4) were transferred to Nabalco. Country Party MP Charles Barnes, who had been a member of the 1963 Select Committee, was appointed chairman of Nabalco's board.

The recommendations of the Select Committee regarding compensation payments were ignored in the Mining (Gove Peninsula Nabalco Agreement) Ordinance 1968 (NT), which unilaterally revoked part of the Yirrkala Aboriginal reserve in order to enable Nabalco to develop the mine. In December 1968, the government granted a 42-year lease to Nabalco.

== Significance ==
The 1963 Yirrkala petitions were the first traditional documents prepared by Indigenous Australians recognised by the Australian Parliament.

Aboriginal people had tried several times before to present petitions to Australian parliaments or the Crown, but these were the first to be accepted in which the traditional form of bark painting (their form of text), juxtaposed with European-style text typed on paper, had been accepted, thus tacitly accepting the existence of Yolngu law. This eventually led to the recognition of Indigenous rights in Commonwealth law.

In 2013, Prime Minister Kevin Rudd called the bark petitions "the Magna Carta for the Indigenous peoples of this land". Like Magna Carta, the petitions are "founding documents setting down principles and inspiring actions for social justice".

== Aftermath ==
=== Wuyul petition (1968) ===
In 1968, the Yolngu had a small win when a new petition, asking to use the Yolngu name for the town established to house mining personnel, was successful, and it was named Nhulunbuy.

The new town had been gazetted as Gove, but a conference of elders decided that the town should be named Nhulunbuy; Nhulun was the Yolngu name for Mount Saunders, next to which the town was to be laid out, and -buy means "from". They created the Wuyul petition, also made of paper pasted on bark, decorated by Marrakulu artist Dundiwuy Wanambi with a picture of ancestral spirit Wuyul the Honey Man, who created Nhulun. This petition was signed by the artist, along with Mungurrawuy, Birrikitj, Mau, Matjidi, Munyu, Nanyin (brother of Narritjin Maymuru), Wandjuk, Djiriny, Guyuyuma, Djayila, and Roy Dadaynga Marika. This petition included Galarrwuy's name, and was presented to Parliament by Opposition member Gough Whitlam. Roy Marika sent a letter to politicians and media, saying "as long as we have minds to think with, eyes to see with, surely there can be an effort on both sides to understand each other's language and customs". This was widely reported and quoted by Nugget Coombs in a speech, which was reported by The Sydney Morning Herald, which backed the change of name. Prime Minister John Gorton backed the change, which was enacted in January 1969.

The Wuyul petition is displayed in Parliament House, alongside the two bark petitions that were presented to Parliament in August 1963.

=== Gove land rights case (1968–1971) ===
The Aboriginal clans whose traditional lands were affected by the Gove project were so strongly opposed to the making of the Mining (Gove Peninsula Nabalco Agreement) Ordinance 1968 that they challenged it in the Supreme Court of the Northern Territory in 1968 in Milirrpum and Others v Nabalco Pty Ltd and the Commonwealth of Australia (the "Gove land rights case"), lodging their writs on 13 December 1968. Milirrpum Marika was the named plaintiff in the action, which sought to protect the people's right to perform sacred rituals on the land leased to Nabalco; the "Others" were Mungurrawuy and Daymbalipu. Galarrwuy acted as an interpreter in the case. In 1971 Justice Richard Blackburn held that the ordinances and mining leases were valid and that the Yolngu people were not able to establish their native title at common law. Justice Blackburn stated that the "doctrine of communal native title does not form and never has formed, part of the law of any part of Australia".

The Milirrpum decision had wide-ranging impacts on relations between Aboriginal people and the mining industry generally throughout Australia. The failure of the bark petitions and the Gove land rights case raised public awareness about the Yolngu just claims, and more generally, some of the other problems of Indigenous people throughout Australia, and led to national protests, including the Aboriginal Tent Embassy.

In 1973 the Whitlam government established the Aboriginal Land Rights Commission, headed by Justice Edward Woodward, to inquire into "the appropriate means to recognise and establish the traditional rights and interests of the Aborigines in and in relation to the land, and to satisfy in other ways the reasonable aspirations of the Aborigines to rights in or in relation to land". This eventually led to the Aboriginal Land Rights Act 1976 (NT) in December 1976, passed under the Whitlam government with bipartisan supported, and enacted under his successor Malcolm Fraser. This enabled Aboriginal people to claim native title rights over land in which traditional ownership could be proven.

=== New Yirrkala governance (1974) ===
After the mission was closed in 1974, Yirrkala moved to a Village Council governance structure. The threat of mining and the submission of the petitions had brought a feeling of unity among the various Yolngu clans, which mostly continued to hold.

=== Gumatj claim (2019–) ===
In 2019, Gumatj leader Galarrwuy Yunupingu, on behalf of the Gumatj clan, instigated a claim in the Federal Court of Australia to recognise native title over the Gove Peninsula as well as seeking compensation of $700 million for the harm caused to their land rights by Commonwealth laws and actions in taking the land, under the Native Title Act 1993 (NTA). The case was heard in 2023, and found in favour of Yunupingu on a number of questions of law, holding that native title rights are equivalent to property rights for the purposes of Section 51(xxxi) of the Australian Constitution. The High Court upheld this decision on 12 March 2025 in Commonwealth v Yunupingu. Compensation had not yet been decided by the end of 2025.

== Petition locations today ==
The two petitions presented to Parliament were put on public display at the Old Parliament House, Canberra in 1977. When the new Parliament House, Canberra was completed in 1988, they were moved to this building. Also on display is a digging stick known as the Djang'kawu digging stick, associated with the creation story of the Yolngu people.

The third petition was donated by Gordon Bryant's son, Robin, to the National Museum of Australia in Canberra in 2009.

The fourth petition was found by historian Clare Wright at La Trobe University to be privately owned by the first wife of Stan Davey, who had been secretary of the Federal Council for Aboriginal Advancement in 1963. In the 1980s, Davey's ex-wife Joan McKie had moved to Western Australia and was living in Derby. In November 2022 Wright organised the handover of the petition to descendants of the original signatories. It was initially restored and conserved at Artlab Australia in Adelaide, before being repatriated to Arnhem Land, to go on permanent display at Buku-Larnŋgay Mulka Centre. The typewriter on which the petitions were typed has also been donated to the centre by the son of Ann and Edgar Wells. A repatriation ceremony was held on Thursday 7 December 2023 at the centre. Among the attendees was Rirratjiŋu clan elder Witiyana Marika.

== In the arts ==
=== 50th anniversary ===
The 50th anniversary of bark petitions was celebrated at the Garma Festival in 2013, with Ron Croxford invited as a special guest.

=== Literature ===
Clare Wright's 2024 book about the history and significance of the petitions, titled Näku Dhäruk: The Bark Petitions: How the People of Yirrkala Changed the course of Australian democracy, won the 2025 Queensland Literary Award for Nonfiction and was shortlisted for both the Victorian Premier's Prize for Nonfiction and the Prime Minister's Literary Award for Australian History in that year.

=== In film ===
A feature documentary film about the petitions, One Mind, One Heart, directed by Larissa Behrendt and produced by Michaela Perske, includes the story of the journey of the fourth petition at the home of Stan Davey's ex-wife in Derby, WA, and its journey back to Yolngu country. The film premiered at the Adelaide Film Festival in October 2024, and was screened on NITV, SBS Television, and SBS On Demand on 19 January 2025. It is still available On Demand as of December 2025.

== See also ==
- 1972 Larrakia Petition
- Aboriginal land rights in Australia
- Barunga Statement
- Uluru Statement from the Heart
- Yirrkala Church Panels
