= Narritjin Maymuru =

Aboriginal Australian artist (c. 1916-1981)

- Born: circa 1916
- Died: 1981 (aged 64–65)
- Other names: Naradin, Ngaradjin, Naritjun, Narrachin, Narratchin, Naratzin, Maymurru, Maymaru, Maymary
- Known for: Bark painting

Narritjin Maymuru (c. 1916–1981) was a Yolngu artist and activist noted for his bark painting. He began painting in the 1940s after time as a cook. After decades of work in 1979 he and his son became visiting artists at the Australian National University. His daughter, Galuma Maymuru, has become recognised as a significant Australian artist.

He died of a heart attack in 1981. His time in Canberra became the subject of a documentary film by Ian Dunlop titled Narritjin in Canberra.

== Early life ==
Narritjin Maymuru was born in North-East Arnhem Land, Northern Territory, Australia around 1916 and died in 1981. He belonged to the Manggalili language group located in the Arnhem region, and was of Yirritja moiety. He described himself as an "artistfella", and worked as an advocate, politician, ceremonial leader, clan head, performer, entrepreneur, and philosopher.

As a young man Maymuru worked in the trepang industry with Fred Grey. Later he played an influential role in his community and was often called upon to assume the role of mediator. He was an advocate for educating and passing on knowledge, not only within his culture, but also to non-Yolŋu people. He saw painting as a means to share Yolŋu arts and culture and communicate knowledge. He believed that sharing knowledge helped create a harmonious relationship between the two cultures, and helped maintain the strength of Yolŋu culture for future generations.

Maymuru faced a near-death experience in 1943 when he was around 30 years old, and the ship he was on, HMAS Patricia Cam, was bombed and began to sink. Maymuru recounted the story of the sinking of the Patricia Cam to Jeremy Long. He stated how “on the first run the plane dropped a bomb, which sank the boat; it dropped another bomb on a second run and it made three runs firing a machine gun. Some were killed, including Djalalingba's two brothers, Djinipula and Djimanbuy, and others were wounded.” After the first bomb, Maymuru passed out, and awoke to find himself trapped under floating wreckage. He was able to use his teeth to tear open a hole in the canvas awning, allowing him to escape the sinking wreck. He then dodged bullets from the Japanese bombers by hiding behind small drums. After the Japanese fighters left, he swam about 600–800 m (2,000–2,600 ft) to a barge filled with other survivors, and “all that afternoon and all that night they swam and drifted, taking turns to rest on the barge.” After a long journey, Maymuru finally made it back to the Yirrkala mission alive.

== Career ==
Maymuru's earliest surviving paintings were commissioned on behalf of the anthropologists Ronald and Catherine Berndt, and completed in 1946. He also produced numerous works for the American-Australian Scientific Expedition to Arnhem Land led by Charles P. Mountford. In the 1950s Maymaru mainly produced carvings on polished hardwood, and by the early 1960s he was considered one of the most renowned Yolngu artists. In 1962 Narritjin Maymuru was an instigator and painter of the Yirrkala Church Panels. In 1963 he helped in painting the Yirrkala Bark Petitions.

Maymuru is accredited as a founding figure of the Buku-Larrnggay Mulka Centre, the community-controlled art centre in Yirrkala. In the 1960s Maymuru sold his art from “his own beachfront gallery”. The small beachfront shelter has grown into a thriving Yolŋu-owned business that sells and exhibits globally.

In 1963 Maymuru performed in Sydney and Melbourne with a group of Yolngu dancers in a tour with the Elizabethan Theatre Trust, during which Maymuru held a solo exhibition of his paintings in Sydney. Through the exhibition Maymuru developed a relationship with Jim Davidson, a Melbourne-based art dealer, which led to his work being represented in galleries and museums across Australia and overseas, especially in the United States.

By 1978 Maymuru and his son Banapana were jointly awarded the Creative Arts Fellowship at the Australian National University (ANU) in Canberra. Narritjin and Banapana were the first Aboriginal artists to receive this award. The award included a three-month fellowship in the arts faculty at ANU, during which Narritjin lectured in the departments of prehistory and anthropology. The Aboriginal Arts Board provided A$4,500 towards the total cost of the fellowship.

Maymuru and Banapana's fellowship became the subject for the film Narritjin in Canberra, directed and narrated by Ian Dunlop. The film follows the artists' fellowship experience at ANU. In one scene, Maymuru is seen lecturing students in an anthropology seminar, in which he discusses the techniques of bark painting and the meanings behind some of his paintings. Towards the end of their fellowship, the two artists held an exhibition of Manggalili art. The film shows the opening night of the exhibition. The film was originally released in 1981 and runs for 40 minutes.

Maymuru remains a widely acclaimed artist internationally, with his paintings featuring in galleries and museums globally. His works have been offered for auction on multiple occasions, with prices ranging from US$291 to UD$4,553. Maymuru saw the arts as a mean to communicate ideas and knowledge. During his life he aimed to pass on this knowledge through art. In the 1960s Narritjin taught his daughters Bumiti and Galuma the madayin miny’tji (sacred clan design), encouraging them to paint. He was one of the first male artists to pass on the knowledge of painting to his daughters.

=== The Yirrkala Church Panels ===
The Yirrkala Church Panels consist of two masonite sheeting panels each reaching four metres (13.12 ft.) in height, they were painted in ochre pigments originating from the Earth. The panels were made to be mounted adjacent to the altar in the newly erected Methodist Church. The panels were completed by eight artists, including l Maymuru. The artists derived from “the two defining halves of Yolngu reality, Yirritja and Dhuwa.” Dhuwa and Yirritja are the two defining moieties of the Yolŋu people. The Yirrkala Church Panels featured no Christian imagery; rather they display an episodic narrative that documents the creation stories and journeys of ancestral beings across Yolŋu land alongside sacred designs.

During the creation of the Yirrkala Church Panels a large-scale mining of bauxite was set to begin on Yirrkala land. The panels were created in part to demonstrate the Aboriginal connection to the land and land ownership. The Methodist minister Reverend Edgar Wells recalled Maymuru proposing "a painting or something" in order to resist the threat of the land takeover. The painting of the church panels was one of the first significant land rights statements documenting the Aboriginal ownership of their country.

The Yirrkala panels were discarded by the church in 1974, but were salvaged by the Buku-Larrnggay Mulka Centre in 1978.

=== Yirrkala bark petitions ===
Narritjin Maymuru also held an influential role in the creation of the Yirrkala bark petitions. In August 1963, senior Yolngu men at Yirrkala mission created a series of typed petitions that were affixed to pieces of bark, which were decorated by four painters in madayin miny’tji (sacred clan design). The petitions were written in both English and Yolngu Matha and were presented in the Australian Parliament's House of Representatives on 14 August 1963. The petitions requested that "before they endure the fate of the other dispossessed Australian Indigenous groups that have had their land and sacred sites destroyed, they request that an enquiry be held with appropriate translators so that they may be heard and consulted about the fate of this special place" The bark petitions were the first example of a formal assertion of native title in Australia. The Australian Parliament rejected the Yirrkala Bark Petitions.

Although the Yirrkala Bark Petitions were rejected, the Yolngu did eventually receive the title rights to their land in 1978 under the Aboriginal Land Rights (Northern Territory) Act 1976.

== Later life and death ==
Maymuru died suddenly in 1981 of a heart attack while he was intervening in a brawl. At the time of his death he, along with his brother Nanyin (father of artist Naminapu Maymuru-White) and classificatory brother Bokarra, were the leaders of the Manggalili clan in Northeast Arnhem Land.

== Collections ==
Narritjin Maymuru's work is held in numerous worldwide collections including:

- Art Gallery of New South Wales
- Kluge-Ruhe Aboriginal Art Collection
- National Gallery of Victoria
- National Gallery of Australia
- National Museum of Australia

== Significant exhibitions ==
- Arnhem Land Art – David Jones Art Gallery in Sydney, Australia. Exhibited in 1949.
- Art of Aboriginal Australia – Exhibition toured North America from 1974-76.
- Dreamings – Exhibited in New York in 1988.
- The Continuing Tradition – Exhibited at the National Gallery of Australia in 1989.
- Crossroads: Towards a New Reality – Exhibited in Japan in 1992.
- Aratjara – Exhibition toured Europe from 1993-94.
- Three Creative Fellows: Sidney Nolan, Arthur Boyd, Narritjin Maymuru – Exhibited at the Australian National University in 2007.
- Ancestral Modern: Australian Aboriginal Art from the Kaplan & Levi Collection – Seattle Art Museum, Simonyi Special Exhibition Galleries. Exhibition held from 31 May 2012 – 2 September 2012.
- Yirrkala Drawings - Art Gallery of New South Wales in Sydney, Australia. Exhibition held from 12 December 2013 – 23 February 2014.
- Miwatj – La Trobe Art Institute in Bendigo, Australia. Exhibition held from 29 May 2018 – July 7, 2018.
- Old Masters; Australia's Great Bark Artists – National Museum of China in Dongcheng, Beijing, China. Exhibition held from 4 July 2018 – 2 September 2018.
- Blue Chip XXIII – Niagara Galleries in Melbourne, Australia. Exhibition held from 24 March 2021 – 17 April 2021.
