= Alusuisse =

Defunct Swiss industrial group

Alusuisse-Lonza Holding AG
- Industry: Industrial electrochemistry, hydropower, packaging, chemicals, extrusions, sheets and plates
- Predecessor: Aluminium Industrie Aktien Ges. (AIAG), 1888; Schweizerische Aluminium AG (1963)
- Founded: 1990
- Defunct: 2000
- Fate: acquired by Alcan
- Successor: Algroup (1998); Alcan (2000)
- Headquarters: Zurich, Switzerland

Alusuisse was a Swiss industrial group founded as Aluminium Industrie Aktien in 1898, Zurich, Switzerland. The organisation was named Schweizerische Aluminium AG from 1963, Alusuisse-Lonza Holding AG from 1990, and Algroup from 1998.

From the 1900s, it became a significant employer in the Valais canton through its aluminum production activities; a byproduct of the aluminium production process: fluorine became the subject of a pollution scandal (guerre du fluor) after its public reporting in the 1970s. In the late 1960s the company also became involved in another contentious public issue through its joint venture, Nabalco, which was developing a bauxite deposit in northern Australia on land claimed by the indigenous people of that area; leading to the Gove land rights case.

By the end of the twentieth century the company had become an international firm with interests in aluminium production, packaging, and chemicals (through the firm Lonza, acquired 1974, divested 1999), and employed over 30,000 worldwide (1997).

The group was acquired by Alcan on 18 October 2000.

== History ==
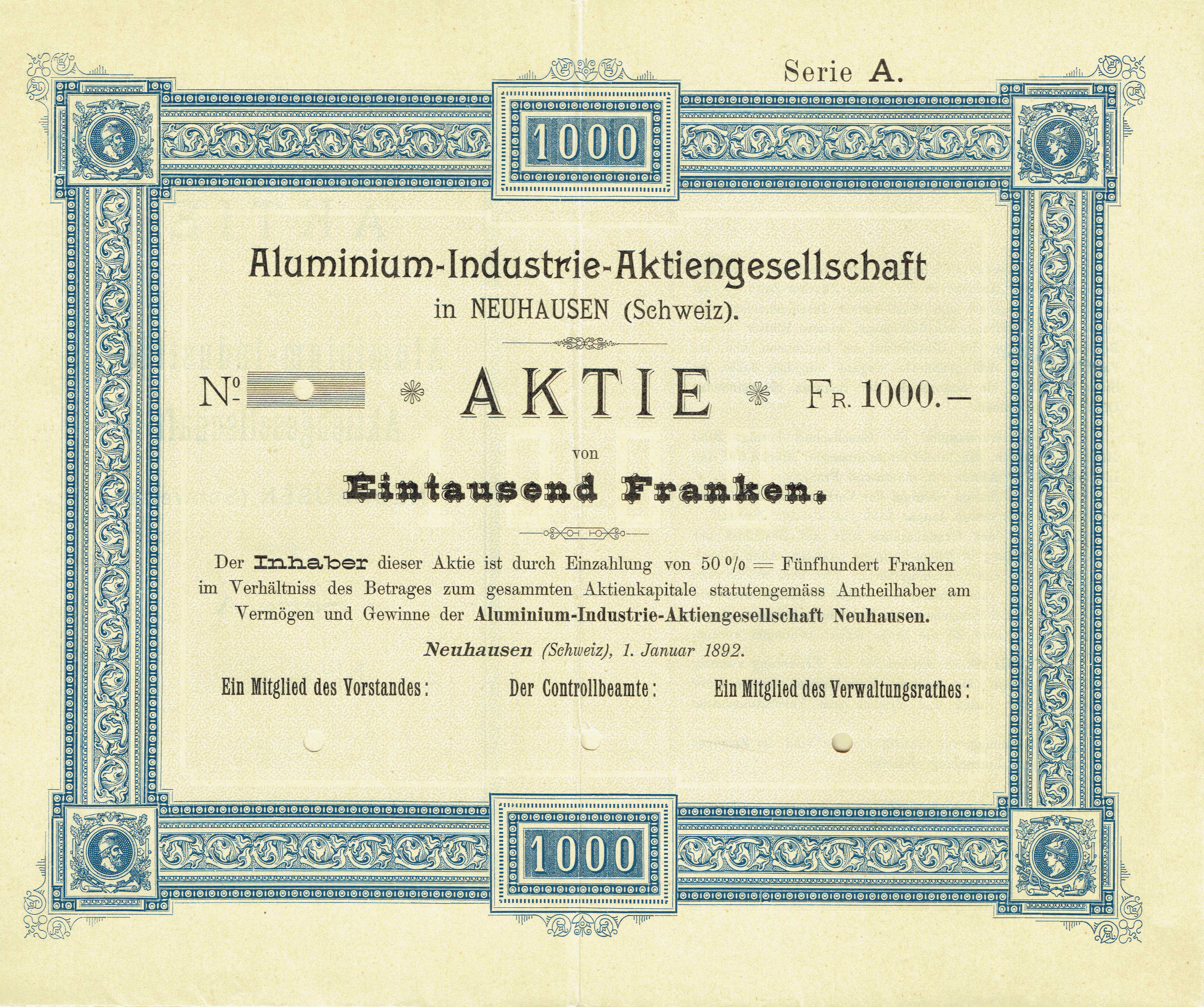
Share of the Aluminium-Industrie-AG, issued 1. January 1892

In 1886 Paul-Louis-Toussaint Héroult and Charles Martin Hall independently discovered a process for producing metallic aluminium from aluminium ore by electrolysis (Hall–Héroult process). In 1889 Paul-Louis-Toussaint Héroult, Gustave Naville, Georg Neher, and Peter Emil Huber established a company Aluminium Industrie Aktien Gesellschaft (AIAG) in Zurich, Switzerland to extract aluminium, creating the first aluminium production plant in Europe. It established plants in Neuhausen am Rheinfall in 1888, in Rheinfelden, Germany in 1898 and in Lend, Austria in 1899.

In 1899, the company started to invest in the Valais region of Switzerland which was rich in hydropower resources. The company built a plant in Chippis (1908) using hydropower from the river Navisence. The market for their aluminium did not meet expectations and the company began to use some of the electrical production for nitric acid manufacture (Birkeland–Eyde process). During the Great Depression the company sold electricity from its plants to municipal customers. A rolling mill was established in Sierre in 1929. In the 1950s the company acquired a concession to 30% of the flow from the dam built at the Lac de Moiry, and constructed a factory at Ernen. A factory in Steg was established in 1962. The company became a major employer in the Valais region, employing over 3000 people in 1942, and by 1970 approximately 2000 people were employed in the canton.

In 1963 the enterprise was renamed Schweizerische Aluminium AG. In the 1970s pollution due to fluorine by aluminium producers, including Alusuisse, caused scandal in Switzerland which came to be known as the guerre du fluor (Fluorine war).

In 1969 the company invested in the development of a large alumina refinery and bauxite mine in the Gove Peninsula, Australia, through the joint venture Nabalco. The development which included the creation of a sea harbour, housing for 5000 people, and was worth over 1 billion swiss francs. The Nabalco consortium was made to pay rent on the land used to the indigenous peoples of the area as a result of the ruling of the Milirrpum v Nabalco Pty Ltd (Gove land rights) case.

During the 1960s the company began to license its aluminium production technology, and in 1967 helped to establish Koninklijke Hoogovens' first aluminium smelter in 1967.

In 1974 the company took over the Swiss-German company Lonza (founded 1897), which specialised in hydropower, construction, and electrochemical industrial production. In 1990 the company became Alusuisse-Lonza Holding AG. In 1999 the chemical production interests were split off to form the chemical company Lonza Group.

Two plants were operated in the UK under the banner of Star Aluminium and Starsemis. One plant, at Briton Ferry, Wales, operated two extrusion presses, a Farrel bridge 2400 ton and a 1600 ton, an anodising plant was also operated. The plant was acquired from Hawker Siddley's High Duty Alloys division, originally operating as a rolling mill and foundry. The second plant, a rolling mill designed for sheet and foil, was in Bridgnorth, Shropshire.

In 1980, the company's aluminium production reached its maximum of over 800,000 tonnes. During the 1980s, the company restructured, closing outdated plants, downsizing, and modernising its semi-finished aluminium production facilities. It also acquired the Canadian packaging company Lawson Mardon Group in 1994, and merged it into its packaging division.

In 1997 the company employed 31,000 people, of which 5,800 were Swiss. The company was renamed Algroup in 1998 and was merged into Alcan in 2000.

== See also ==
- Constellium, former business unit Alcan Engineered Products separated from RioTinto Alcan in 2011
