= Mithinarri Gurruwiwi =

- Born: 1929; Blue Mud Bay
- Died: 1976 (aged 46–47); Yirrkala
- Other names: Midinari, Midhinarri, Mitinari

Mithinarri Gurruwiwi (c.1929–1976) was an Aboriginal Australian painter of the Gälpu clan of the Yolngu people of north-eastern Arnhem Land in the Northern Territory of Australia. His first name is sometimes spelt Midinari, Mitinari, or Mithinari. He had a very successful career as an artist, with his works featured in many significant exhibitions and collections worldwide. He also became one of the painters of the famous 1962 Yirrkala Church Panels, which are now housed in the Buku-Larrnggay Museum.

== Early life ==
Mithinarri (also spelt Midinari, Mitinari, or Mithinari) Gurruwiwi was born in 1929 to the Galpu clan and the Dhuwa moiety of the Yolngu people, in the Blue Mud Bay area of North-east Arnhem Land. The Galpu clan is known to play the yidaki or didgeridoo. Besides Yirrkala, the Galpu clan also lives at Galiwinku, Goulburn Island, Gunyungarra, Gangan and Galupa.

Gurruwiwi first learned to paint as a young man, receiving mentorship from a group of Dhuwa moiety artists that included notable artists like Larrtjannga Ganambarr and Wandjuk Marika. They were taught by Wandjuk's father, Mawalan Marika, a master bark painter, at Beach Camp in Yirrkala in Arnhem Land.

== Career ==
Gurruwiwi was a prolific and passionate artist. Although many Aboriginal Artists have started to transition into European paintbrushes, Gurruwiwi continued working with brushes made of frayed stringy bark when applying background colour as well as drawing the main figurative components of his paintings. His design was created by brushes made of human hair or from the midrib of a palm frond. Gurruwiwi was both skilled and fast, leading to paintings of large scale. He adapted his compositions brilliantly to the size of the bark available, as in Djaykung (File snakes), c.1960, and Wuyal the Honey Man, c.1960. Gurruwiwi frequented subjects such as Wild Cabbage, Wagilag Sisters Myth, Rainbow Serpent, Snake in his paintings using Natural Earth Pigments on Eucalyptus Bark. His style of painting featured repeated motifs organized in patterns that suggest the rhythms of ritual performance. Gurruwiwi's paintings are characterized by a diversity of forms but also have an overall coherence of stylistic elements. The relationship between figuration and abstraction often exhibits Yolngu art characteristics, and thus, his portfolio includes both more literal as well as more abstract paintings. Mithinarri's figurative representations often integrate itself with his geometric clan designs, creating a flowing composition that consist of both stylistic elements. However, some of his paintings are also more separate in their style. For example, many of his paintings of Garrimala burst with vibrant life that characterize the rich inland lake with snakes, birds and fish competing with each other among the waterlilies. In other paintings, he reduces the figurative element almost to the point of abstraction, capturing his energy and emotion solely within the design itself.

Gurruwiwi was most active in the 1960s and was one of the artists who worked on the famous 1962 Yirrkala church panels, alongside Mathaman Marika and Mawalan Marika. Around this time, he also painted a series of superb large barks for the collector Stuart Scougall.

His works have garnered an international following, appearing in many significant overseas exhibitions, including Australian Aboriginal Art in Chicago in 1972, and Aratjara – Art of the First Australians in Düsseldorf, London, and Humlebaek, 1993–94. He is represented in all Australian state galleries as well as in Kluge-Ruhe Aboriginal Art Collection in the United States.

== Personal life and death ==
Gurruwiwi also had a daughter, Djul’tjul, who painted from Gurrumurru. Mithinari's son Gurrukmungu Gurruwiwi is also an artist renowned for his paintings and carvings.

Gurruwiwi was often characterised as an eccentric man. He usually camped slightly apart from the other members of his community, although he would be often surrounded by his children. He also painted on the beach under a shade of palm fronds stuck into the sand.

In 1976, Gurruwiwi died at the age of 45.

== Collections ==
Among the many collections in which Gurruwiwi's work has been featured, the 1962 Yirrkala Church panels are one of the most significant and well-known. These panels were two 4-metre (13 ft) works painted by eight artists from each of the two defining halves of Yolngu reality, Yirritja and Dhuwa. The Yirrkala Church Panels were painted in earth pigments (ochres) and featured no Christian imagery; a central focus was to balance that spirituality with the Yolngu cosmology. The church discarded them in 1974, but they were rescued in 1978 and brought to the fledgling Buku-Larrnggay Mulka Centre, and are now displayed in the Mulka Museum.

Gurruwiwi's work is seen in many renowned collections:

- The National Gallery of Virginia
- The Art Gallery of New South Wales
- The National Museum of Australia
- Kluge-Ruhe Aboriginal Art Collection of the University of Virginia
- Buku-Larrnggay Museum
- Sydney: Museum of Contemporary Art
- State Art Collection
- Art Gallery of Western Australia
- National Gallery of Victoria
- Westpac Gallery
- Design Warehouse Sydney
- Tasmanian Museum and Art Gallery
- The Royal Pavilion, Art Gallery & Museums
- Museum and Art Gallery of the Northern Territory
- Newcastle Regional Gallery
- Meadow Brook Art Gallery
- Field Museum of Natural History
- The Art Galleries, University of California at Santa Barbara
- R. H. Lowie Museum of Anthropology
- Naprstkovo Muzeum

== Significant exhibitions ==
Gurruwiwi has been represented in exhibitions all over the world in universities, museums, and art galleries. They have featured some of his most well-known works in combination with other Aboriginal artists. All throughout Australia, in Paris, and at the University of Virginia, Gurruwiwi's work was and still is made available to the public in major collections. All Australian state galleries feature his paintings and his art can also be seen in the Kluge-Ruhe Aboriginal Art Collection in the United States. Below is a timeline of his exhibitions, ranging from 1963 to 2009.

- Art of Arnhem Land, David Jones, Sydney. 1963
- The Melbourne Moomba Festival, Exhibition of Aboriginal Art by the Aboriginal Advancement League, Myer Emporium, Melbourne, Victoria. 1963
- Australie, Osobnost Primitivni'ho Malire Naprstkovo Muzeum, Prague. 1969
- Australian Aboriginal Art The Louis A. Allen Collection, R. H. Lowie Museum of Anthropology, University of California, Berkeley 1969
- Australian Aboriginal Art The Art Galleries, University of California, Santa Barbara. 1970
- Australian Aboriginal Art Field Museum of Natural History, Chicago. 1972
- The Art of Aboriginal Australia North American Tour 1974-76
- Australian Bark Painting from the collection of Dr. Edward L. Ruhe, Meadow Brook Art Gallery, Oakland University, Rochester, Michigan, USA. 1975
- Aboriginal Art by the Australian Institute of Aboriginal and Torres Strait Islander Studies, Canberra. 1984
- Aboriginal Bark Paintings from Arnhem Land Newcastle Regional Gallery. 1984
- Ancestors and Spirits National Gallery of Australia. 1987
- The Inspired Dream, Life as art in Aboriginal Australia Museum and Art Gallery of the Northern Territory, International Tour. 1988
- Yolngu, Aboriginal cultures of north Australia The Royal Pavilion, Art Gallery & Museums, Brighton, UK. 1988
- Arnhem Land Dreaming: Bark Paintings from Tasmanian Collections Tasmanian Museum and Art Gallery. 1989
- Aboriginal Art: The Continuing Tradition National Gallery of Australia, Canberra. 1989
- Keepers of the Secrets, Aboriginal Art from Arnhemland Art Gallery of Western Australia, Perth. 1989
- Spirit in Land, Bark Paintings from Arnhem Land National Gallery of Victoria. 1989
- A Myriad of Dreaming: Twentieth Century Aboriginal Art Westpac Gallery, Melbourne. 1989
- ARATJARA, Art of the First Australians Kunstsammlung Nordrhein-Westfalen, Düsseldorf; Hayward Gallery, London; Louisiana Museum of Modern Art, U.S.; Humlebaek and Denmark tour. 1993/4
- Art of the Rainbow Snake National Gallery of Victoria, Melbourne. 1994
- Yiribana gallery at the Art Gallery of New South Wales, Sydney. 1994
- Miny'tji Buku Larrnggay, Paintings from the East at the National Gallery of Victoria, Melbourne. 1995
- Aratjara – Art of the First Australians in Düsseldorf, London, and Humlebaek. 1993–94
- Yirrkala Artists: Everywhen Art Gallery of Western Australia. 2009
- Old Masters Exhibition at the National Gallery of Australia.
