= Bark painting =

Australian Aboriginal art form

Bark painting is an Australian Aboriginal art form, involving painting on the interior of a strip of tree bark. While examples of painted bark shelters were found in the south-eastern states (then colonies) of Tasmania, Victoria, and New South Wales in the 19th century, as well as later on bark shelters in northern Australia, it is now typically only found as a continuing form of artistic expression in Arnhem Land and other regions in the Top End of Australia, including parts of the Kimberley region of Western Australia.

Bark paintings were traditionally produced (especially among the Yolngu peoples) for instructional and ceremonial purposes and were transient objects. Today, they are keenly sought after by collectors and public arts institutions.

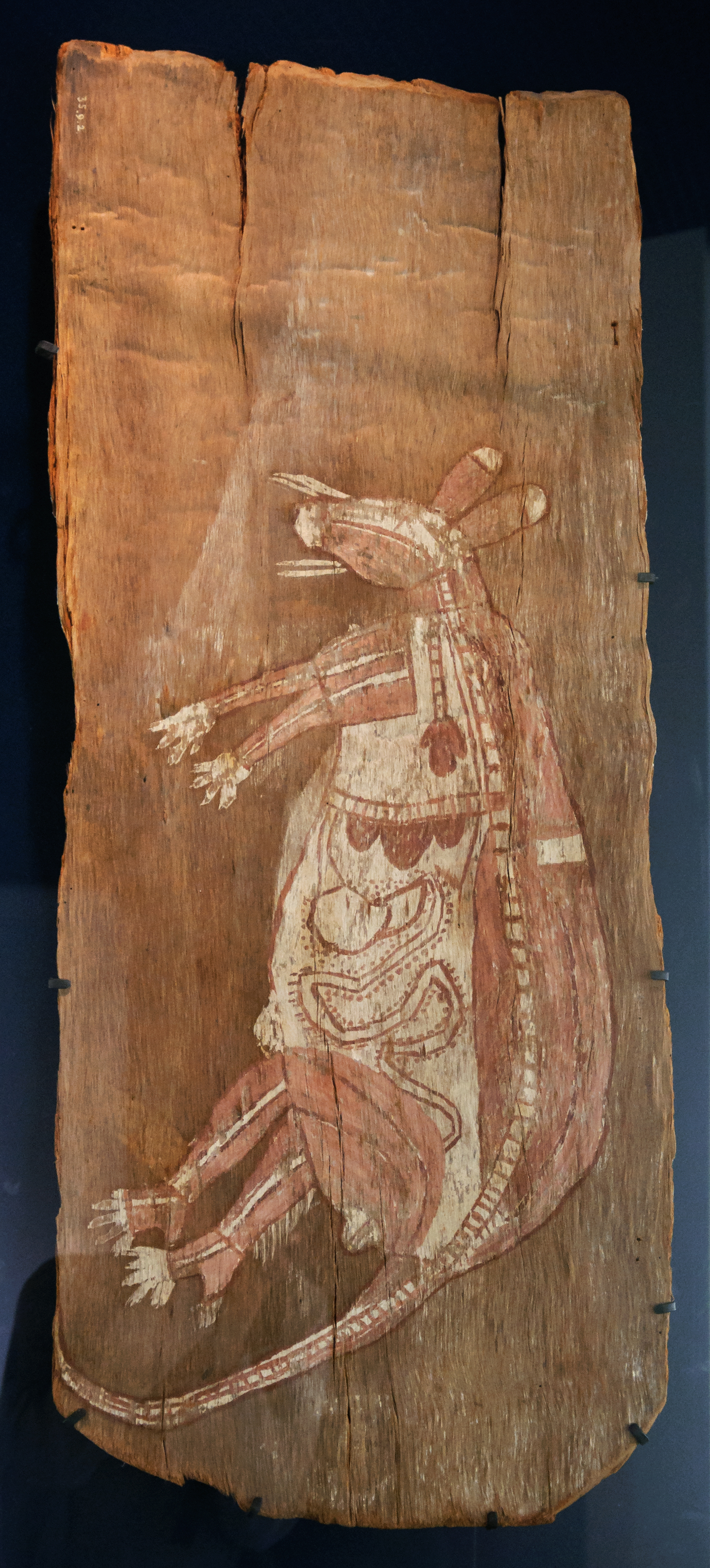
Kangaroo totemic ancestor - Bark painting, Arnhem Land, c. 1915

== History ==
Painting on the dried bark stripped off trees, using ochres, is an old tradition. The earliest European find was in a bark shelter over a grave in Tasmania around 1800, recorded by French artist Nicolas-Martin Petit, who travelled with Nicolas Baudin to Tasmania between 1800 and 1804. Other painted bark shelters were later found in Victoria and New South Wales. These were drawn with charcoal, and then painted or scratched onto bark which had been blackened by smoke. The earliest surviving bark paintings date from the 19th century, an example of which is a bark etching of a kangaroo hunt now in the British Museum, which was collected near Boort in northern Victoria by the British explorer John Hunter Kerr. Another example, painted before 1876, is held by the Museum of Victoria.

In the Kimberley and Arnhem Land, the paintings on bark shelters were similar in style to those done in rock shelters, which illustrated various stories told to young people when people were confined to the shelters for long periods during the wet season. Bark coffins and belts were painted in northeast Arnhem Land, and painted bark baskets were also used in death rituals on the Tiwi Islands.

The modern form of bark paintings began when works were commissioned from Yolngu artists. In 1912 Baldwin Spencer commissioned bark paintings at Gunbalanya (Oenpelli), and soon collectors were wanting to purchase more like these. Spencer looked for paintings on the basis of artistic and aesthetic merit, and provided examples to the Museum of Victoria. Many of these early artists' names are no longer known. Missionaries started encouraging the production of these paintings for sale, to help fund the missions, as well as to educate white Australians about Yolngu culture: from the late 1920s, Reverend Thomas Theodor Webb at Milingimbi Island, and, from 1935, Reverend W. Chaseling at Yirrkala. The Both of these mission stations were run by the Methodist Overseas Mission.

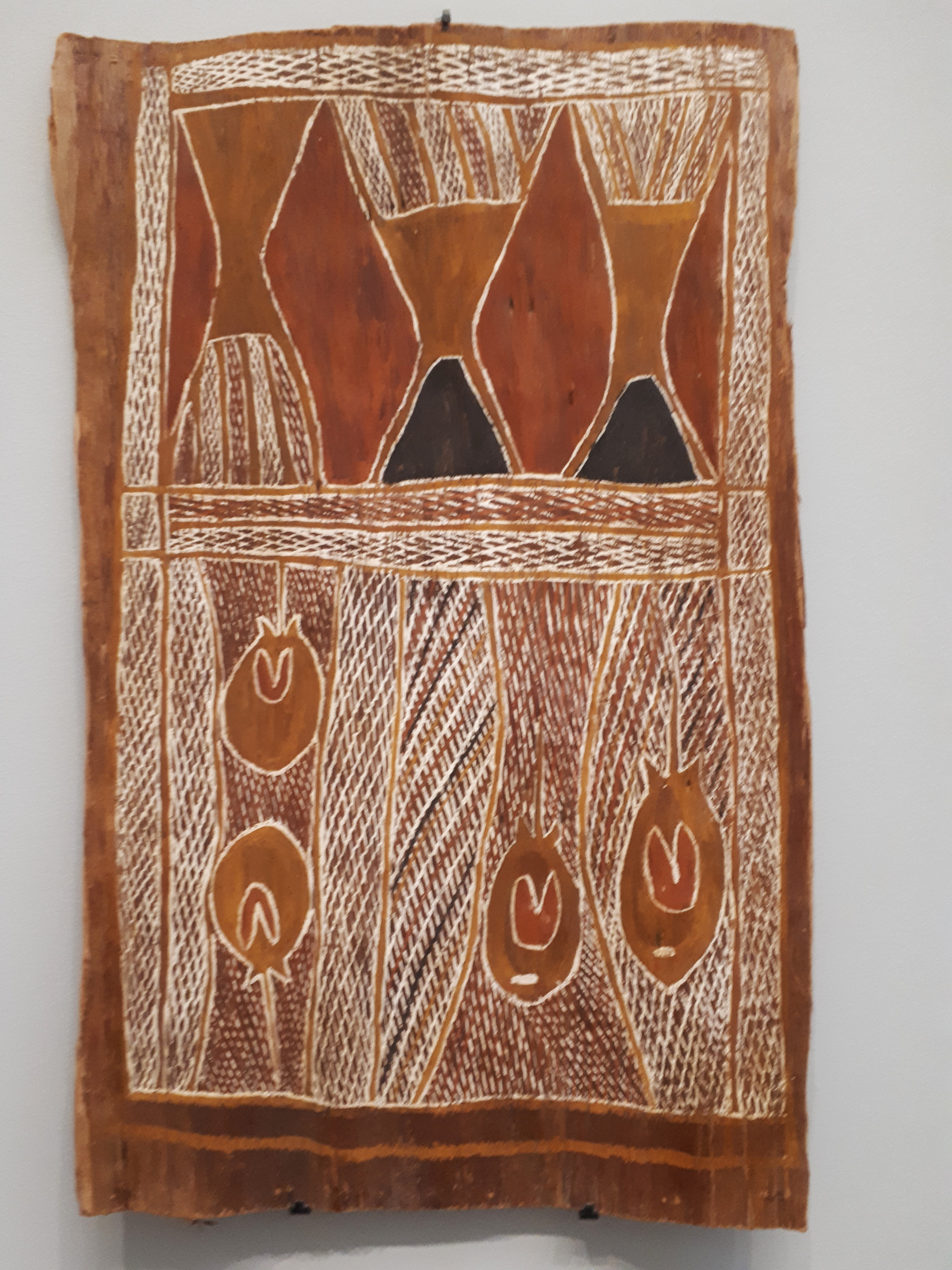
The Sea and the Sky (1948), by Mungurrawuy Yunupingu

From the 1930s through to the 1950s, the main collectors of bark paintings were anthropologists and missionaries, including Norman Tindale at Groote in 1922, W. Lloyd Warner, Charles P. Mountford, Ronald and Catherine Berndt, W. E. H. Stanner, and Karel Kupka. Mission superintendent Edgar Wells took an interest in the art of the people, as had Webb before him, not only for the income it brought to the mission when sold, but also as means of to understand better the Indigenous people's culture.

Demand for the paintings increased during the 1960s, mostly sold through mission shops. In 1963, the Yirrkala bark petitions, comprising four documents presented on bark adorned with images of local fish and animals by artists at Yirrkala mission, were presented to the Australian Parliament, becoming the first documentary recognition of Indigenous Australians in Australian law. The petitions asserted that the Yolngu people owned land over which the federal government had granted mining rights to a private company, Nabalco. Reverend Wells, then superintendent of Yirrkala mission, supported the Yolngu people in their attempts to keep their land from the bauxite mining company.

In 1971, the federal government established a centralised marketing company in 1971, and from 1973 the Aboriginal Arts Board of the Australia Council gave funding to communities to establish community arts centres and to employ arts advisers. From the 1970s, Maningrida, Ramingining, and Katherine developed as centres for marketing bark paintings. Today, most bark paintings are produced for the art market, although some artists still produce traditional designs.

== Description and interpretation ==
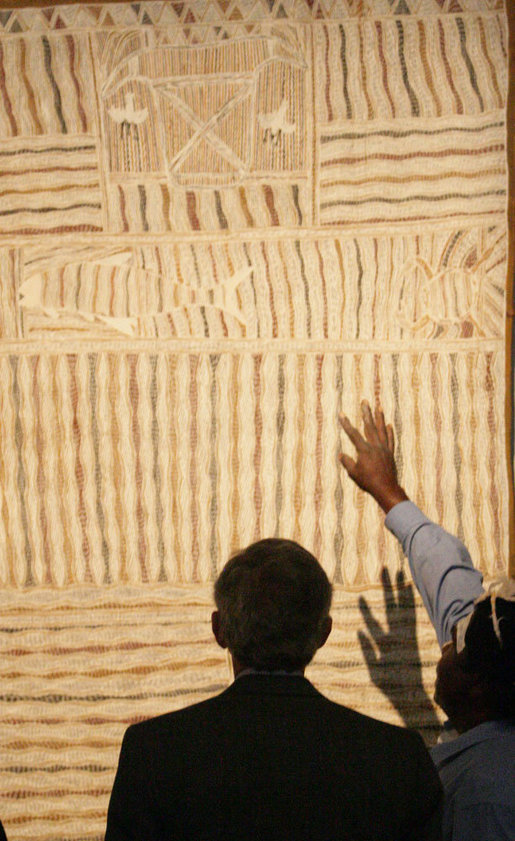
U.S. President George W. Bush examines a Yirrkala bark painting at the Australian National Maritime Museum in Sydney in September 2007

Bark paintings are based on sacred designs that include abstract patterns and designs (such as cross-hatching in particular colours) that identify a clan, and also often contain elements of the eternal Dreamtime. Sometimes the elements of a story are obvious—such as men or animals—but sometimes the elements are symbolic. What appears to the tourist as a series of wavy lines punctuated by dots may actually be telling a complex Dreaming story describing the path of a creator spirit and events that happened along the way.

An uninitiated man or woman is only allowed to paint "outside" stories, the sort of story that might be told to a child. An initiated man can paint an "inside" story, which is restricted knowledge. Thus, a painting may be displayed in an exhibition, or put up for sale, but the artist, although having the right to paint the story, does not have the right to tell the story to another person. Alternatively, the story behind the painting may be one that may not be told to an uninitiated person.

Non-Indigenous people who, like Howard Morphy, have spent years studying the subject, still have an outsider's view and rely on analogies. The Yolngu language and culture has words and concepts that are unfamiliar to non-indigenous cultures, which makes understanding the art form difficult. The following explanation only describes the physical aspects.

== Components ==
A bark painting consists of several components, not all of which may be present in an individual painting, and that are generally applied in the following order:

1. Ground
2. Border
3. Dividing lines
4. Feature blocks
5. Figurative designs
6. Geometric designs
7. Clan designs
8. Cross-hatching

=== Ground ===
In all cases, the bark is first covered with a layer of ochre, which is usually red or white, occasionally yellow or black.

=== Borders, dividing lines, and feature blocks ===
The border, if present, is usually yellow (which originated from a Yirrkala clan design). The paintings are sometimes divided into sections known as feature blocks, which feature either separate stories, or scenes in a story.

=== Figurative designs ===
Figurative designs resemble a real (or mythological) object or being. Thus, a figurative design of a possum resembles a possum, as opposed to being an abstract symbol for a possum, which is recognisable only to someone familiar with this symbolism. Most commercially available bark paintings contain recognisable figurative designs that often tells a traditional story.

=== Geometric or figurative designs ===
Geometric are representational symbols, and their meaning often depends on context and on who painted the painting. The same symbol can also have different meanings. For example, a circle might represent a water hole, a campsite, a mat, a campfire, a nut, or an egg, depending on context. Yolngu culture takes a holistic view of the world, in which these meanings may not be so very different after all. Morphy gives the example of a circle and a line, which a non-initiate is told represents a "kangaroo water hole", and depicts a water hole with a creek running into it. At a later ceremony, when he says he knows it's a kangaroo water hole, he is told "That water hole was made by the old man kangaroo digging in the ground with his tail to make a well for water, using his tail as a digging stick". Later, he is told an even more complex story involving a female kangaroo. (See Morphy for the detailed story.)

=== Clan designs ===
Unlike the previous components of the painting, clan designs are sacred and initially did not appear on public paintings, although nowadays they can be seen on commercial paintings. A clan design may consist of a combination of symbols, geometric designs, and cross hatching, One clan symbol, for example, consists of a series of interlocking diamonds painted in particular colours, whilst another includes symbols of a “sugar-bag” (wild honey). A Yolngu person can immediately identify the clan and moiety of the painter from that design, which then also provides further context for interpreting the symbolism of the geometric designs.

=== Cross-hatching (rarrk) ===
Cross-hatching, or rarrk, is perhaps one of the most distinctive features of Yolngu art of north-eastern Arnhem Land. Closely spaced parallel fine lines are drawn, intersecting each other. Traditionally it is done on bark, using grass, although artists also use the technique on modern art materials and brushes are almost always used. Artists using the rarrk technique often blend traditional themes or influences, using the traditional colours, restricted to black and white and red ochre and yellow ochre. Many Kunwinjku artists also employ rarrk, including John Mawurndjul and Peter Marralwanga.

A sub-style of rarrk, known as x-ray art, shows part of the internal organs of the animals in the painting.

=== Subject material ===
The content depicted by the painting is often either a traditional Dreaming story or a map. Sometimes it will be both, because the ancestral stories and songs often refer to the paths of creation ancestors as they travel across the land (see songlines). Morphy gives an example of a painting that depicts a particular ancestral journey, but also shows where an airstrip was built.

== Regional variations in style and form ==
Bark paintings from the Kimberley in Western Australia are very similar to the rock art in that region: mainly, representations of the Wandjina creator-beings associated with wet season thunderstorms. These are large faces with rayed headdresses, with not much other body detail.

Bark paintings from Port Keats/Wadeye in the north-west of the Northern Territory, combine figurative imagery (as found in eastern Kimberley and Arnhem Land), and geometric patterns, related to desert art styles.

The Tiwi people of Bathurst and Melville Islands paint colourful crosshatched and dotted non-figurative designs. Similar designs are also painted on bark baskets (tungas), sculptures carved from ironwood, and various other items of material culture relating to mortuary ceremonies.

Work from Groote Eylandt is distinctive, with figures painted against a black background, and also often depict representations of the boats known as prau used by Makassan trepangers.

According to Wally Caruana, former senior curator of the Aboriginal and Torres Strait Islander art collections at the National Gallery of Australia, the imagery in bark paintings is broadly similar across Arnhem Land, with some differences:

- In western Arnhem Land, the connection to rock art has resulted in the predominance of figurative imagery, reliant on the artist's draughtsmanship.
- In eastern Arnhem Land, bark painters prefer geometric compositional templates with an emphasis on patterned clan designs.
- In central Arnhem Land, artists tend to combine both approaches. In fact, figurative, abstracted or geometric imagery exists in all areas.

Central and eastern Arnhem Land designs connect to their body painting and ceremonial designs.

== Manufacture ==
The barest necessities for bark artwork are paint, brushes, bark, fixative and a fire.

The material of choice is the bark from stringybark (Eucalyptus tetradonta). The bark must be free of knots and other blemishes. It is best cut from the tree in the wet season when the sap is rising. Two horizontal slices and a single vertical slice are made into the tree, and the bark is carefully peeled off with the aid of a sharpened tool. Only the inner smooth bark is kept and placed in a fire. After heating in the fire, the bark is flattened under foot and weighted with stones or logs to dry flat. Once dry, it is ready to paint upon.

Earth pigments—or ochres—in red, yellow and black are used, also mineral oxides of iron and manganese and white pipeclay, or calcium carbonate. Ochres may be fixed with a binder such as PVA glue, or previously, with the sap or juice of plants such as orchid bulbs.

After the painting is completed, the bark is splinted at either end to keep the painting flat. A fixative, traditionally orchid juice, is added over the top.

== Notable Aboriginal bark painters ==
Notable bark painters include:

- Curly Bardkadubbu
- Djäwa Daygurrgurr
- Paddy Dhathangu
- Binyinyuwuy Djarrankuykuy
- Djambawa Marawilli
- Nonggirrnga Marawili
- Wandjuk Marika (also a noted didgeridoo player)
- John Mawurndjul
- Narritjin Maymuru
- George Milpurrurru
- Lofty Bardayal Nadjamerrek
- Paddy Compass Namadbara
- Bobby Barrdjaray Nganjmirra
- Mick Makani Wilingarr
- Jimmy Wululu
- Yirawala
- Gulumbu Yunupingu
- Mungurrawuy Yunupingu
- Nyapanyapa Yunupingu

== See also ==
- Buku-Larrnggay Mulka Centre
- Yirrkala bark petitions
