= Yirrkala =

Town in the Northern Territory, Australia

- Town
- Coordinates: 12°15′10″S 136°53′30″E
- Country: Australia
- State: Northern Territory
- LGA: East Arnhem Region
- Location: 18 km (11 mi) SE of Nhulunbuy; 723 km (449 mi) ENE of Katherine; 1,037 km (644 mi) E of Darwin

Government
  - Territory electorate: Mulka
  - Federal division: Lingiari
- Elevation: 8 m (26 ft)

Population
  - Total: 657 (SAL 2021)
- Postcode: 0880

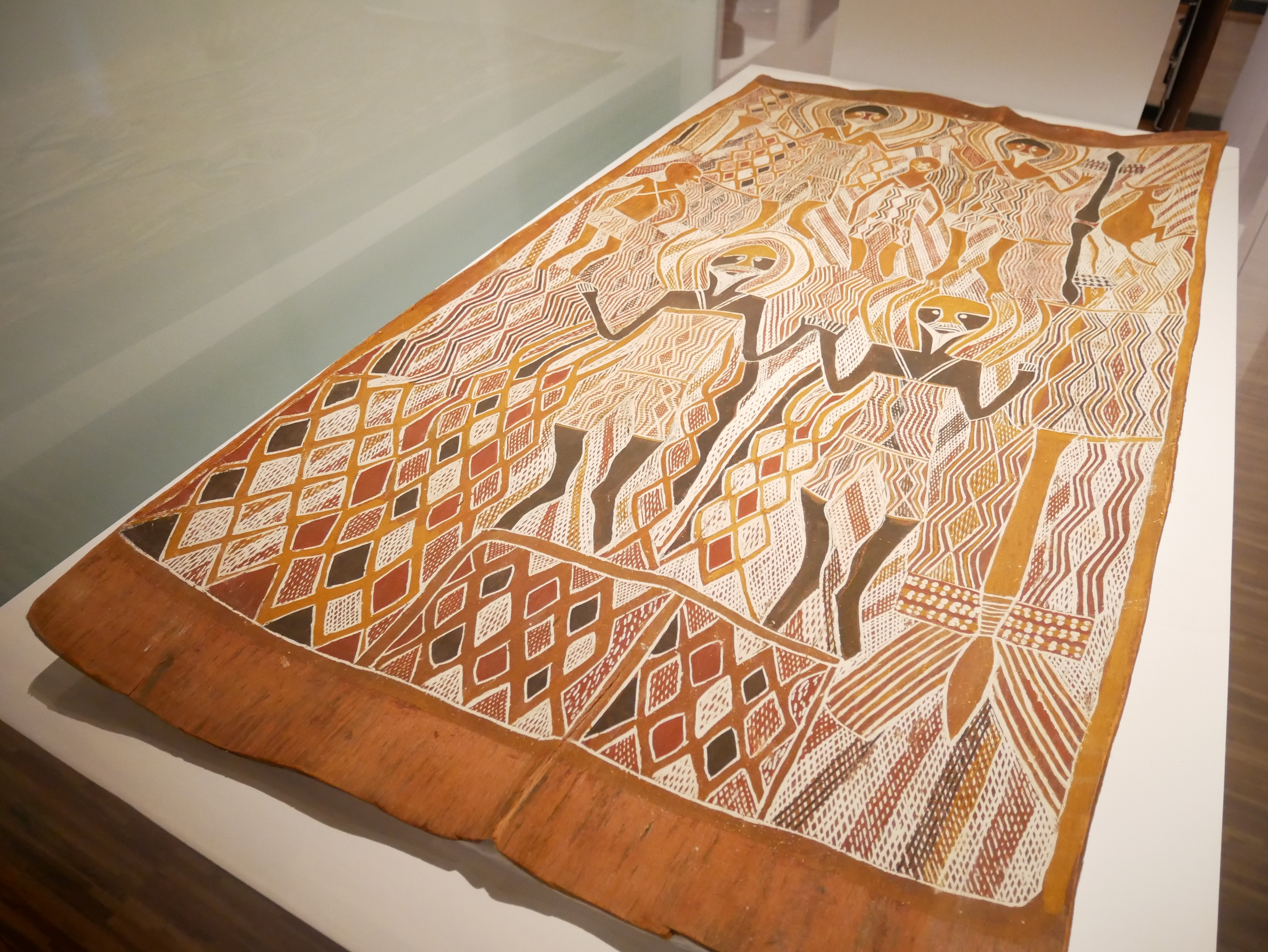
A bark painting collected at Yirrkala

Yirrkala is a small community in East Arnhem Region, Northern Territory, Australia, 18 kilometres (11 mi) southeast of the large mining town of Nhulunbuy, on the Gove Peninsula in Arnhem Land. It is known for the former mission, established as an Aboriginal reserve after being founded by Methodist missionaries in 1935, and for what became known as the Yirrkala bark petitions. These were a set of petitions submitted by the Aboriginal residents of the mission to the Australian Parliament in 1963 asking for consultation about their land taken for mining. This marked an important moment in the history of Indigenous land rights in Australia and native title in Australia.

Yirrkala's population comprises predominantly Aboriginal Australians of the Yolngu peoples. At the 2021 census, Yirrkala had a population of 657, of whom 79.8% identified as Aboriginal and/or Torres Strait Islander people.

== History ==
=== Mission ===
There has been an Aboriginal community at Yirrkala throughout recorded history, but the community increased enormously in size when Yirrkala mission was founded in 1935, with people from 13 different Yolngu clans moving to Yirrkala. Around this time, the Methodist Overseas Mission (MOM) was encouraging their senior staff to study anthropology under A. P. Elkin at Sydney University, to learn more about Aboriginal Australian culture, in particular the Yolngu people who lived in East Arnhem.

Mission superintendents included founding superintendent Wilbur Chaseling, Harold Thornell, and Edgar Wells, who wrote about their experiences there. The residents were free to come and go as they wished, and the interaction was on the whole positive in those early days, with a lack of dogmatism by the missionaries, and the Yolngu people accommodating Christianity within a version of their own beliefs.

MOM received a government subsidy to run the mission, and school classes operated from 1936, at first outdoors under a tree, and later beneath the Mission House. In 1951, a new school building was built, and, by 1952, it had 47 children regularly attending classes there, taught by a Miss Proctor. She was not a trained teacher, but had worked at the mission on Goulburn Island for three years. The mission received child endowment for every Aboriginal child there, regardless of attendance at the school.

During World War II, a Royal Australian Air Force (RAAF) airbase operated close by. Many mission residents worked there, as boat pilots for the RAAF and the Royal Australia Navy, or assisted the war effort by other means. The school did not operate during this time, and all "white women" were evacuated in 1942.

Around 1974, control of the mission was passed to the Yirrkala Dhanbul Community Association, and it was no longer was operated as a mission thereafter.

=== Church panels and bark petitions ===
Yirrkala played a pivotal role in the development of the relationship between Indigenous and non-Indigenous Australians.

In early 1963, clan elders came together to paint the Yirrkala Church Panels, which documented the Yolngu claim to the land through ancestral stories. Consisting of two 4 m (13 ft) sheets of masonite, eight elders of the Dhuwa moiety painted one sheet with their major ancestral narratives and clan designs, and eight elders of the Yirritja moiety painted the other sheet with Yirritja designs.

A series of four petitions, attached to decorated bark panels, were created at the mission in 1963 and sent to the Federal Government to protest the Prime Minister's announcement that a parcel of their land was to be sold to a bauxite mining company. Although the petitions were unsuccessful in the sense that the bauxite mining at Nhulunbuy went ahead as planned, it alerted non-Indigenous Australians to the need for Indigenous representation in such decisions, and it prompted a government report recommending compensation payments, protection of sacred sites, creation of a permanent parliamentary standing committee to scrutinise developments at Yirrkala, and also acknowledgments of the Indigenous people's moral right to their lands. This marked an important moment in the history of Indigenous land rights in Australia and native title in Australia.

One of the Bark Petitions is on display in the Parliament House in Canberra.

=== Outstation status ===
The settlement was funded as an outstation during the 1980s.

== Location and description ==
Yirrkala is a small community in East Arnhem Region, Northern Territory, 18 kilometres (11 mi) southeast of the large mining town of Nhulunbuy, on the Gove Peninsula in Arnhem Land.

== Governance and people ==
As of 2026 the East Arnhem Regional Council is the local government for Yirrkala, which is in the council's Gumurr Miwatj Ward. It consults with Yirrkala Mala Leaders Association, consisting of 12 elected community members.

The Northern Land Council is the land council to the community, responsible for matters under the Aboriginal Land Rights (Northern Territory) Act 1976.

At the 2021 census, Yirrkala had a population of 657, of whom 79.8% identified as Aboriginal and/or Torres Strait Islander people.

== Culture ==
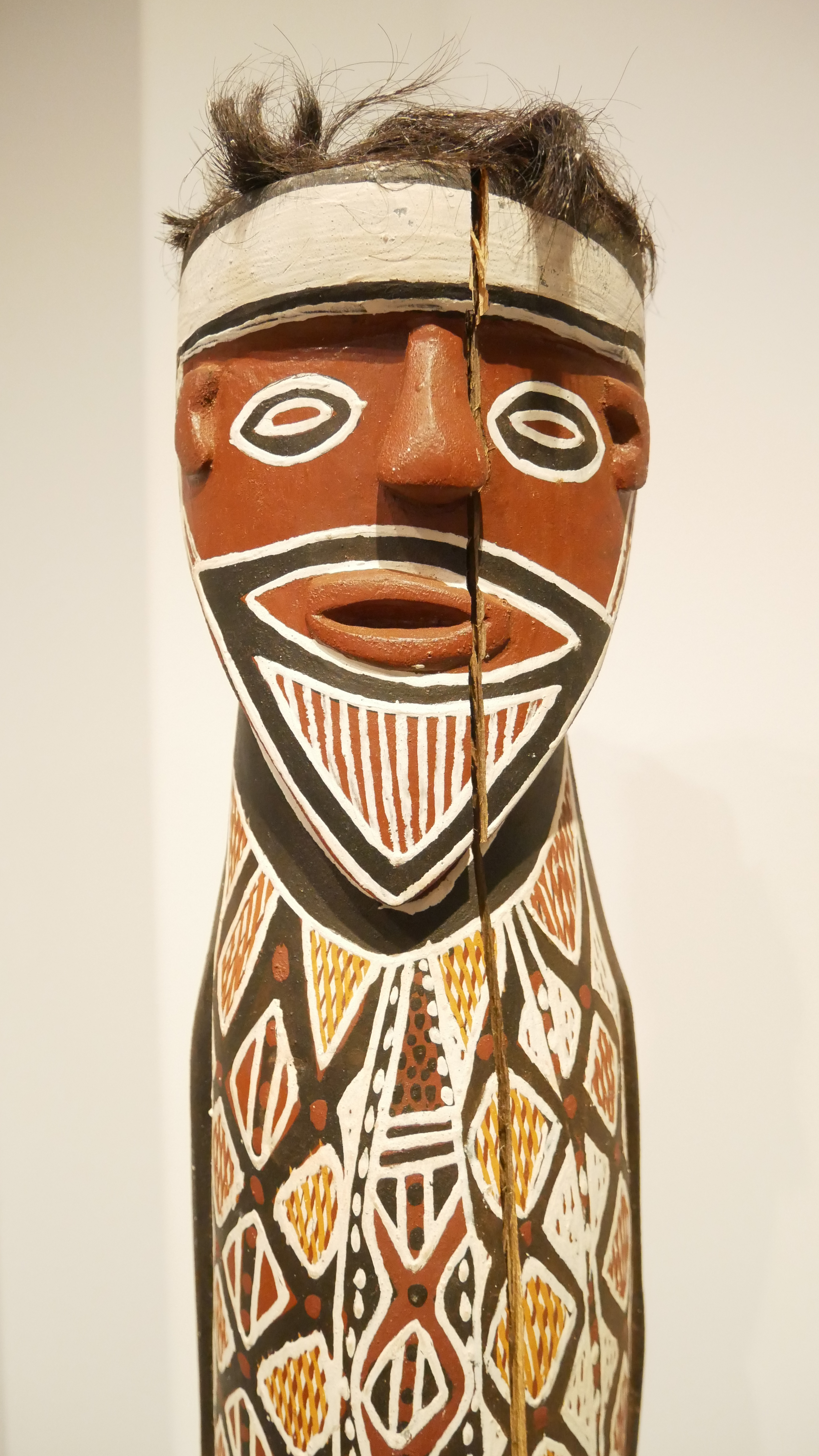
A woodcarving of Nureri the fire ancestor collected at Yirrkala

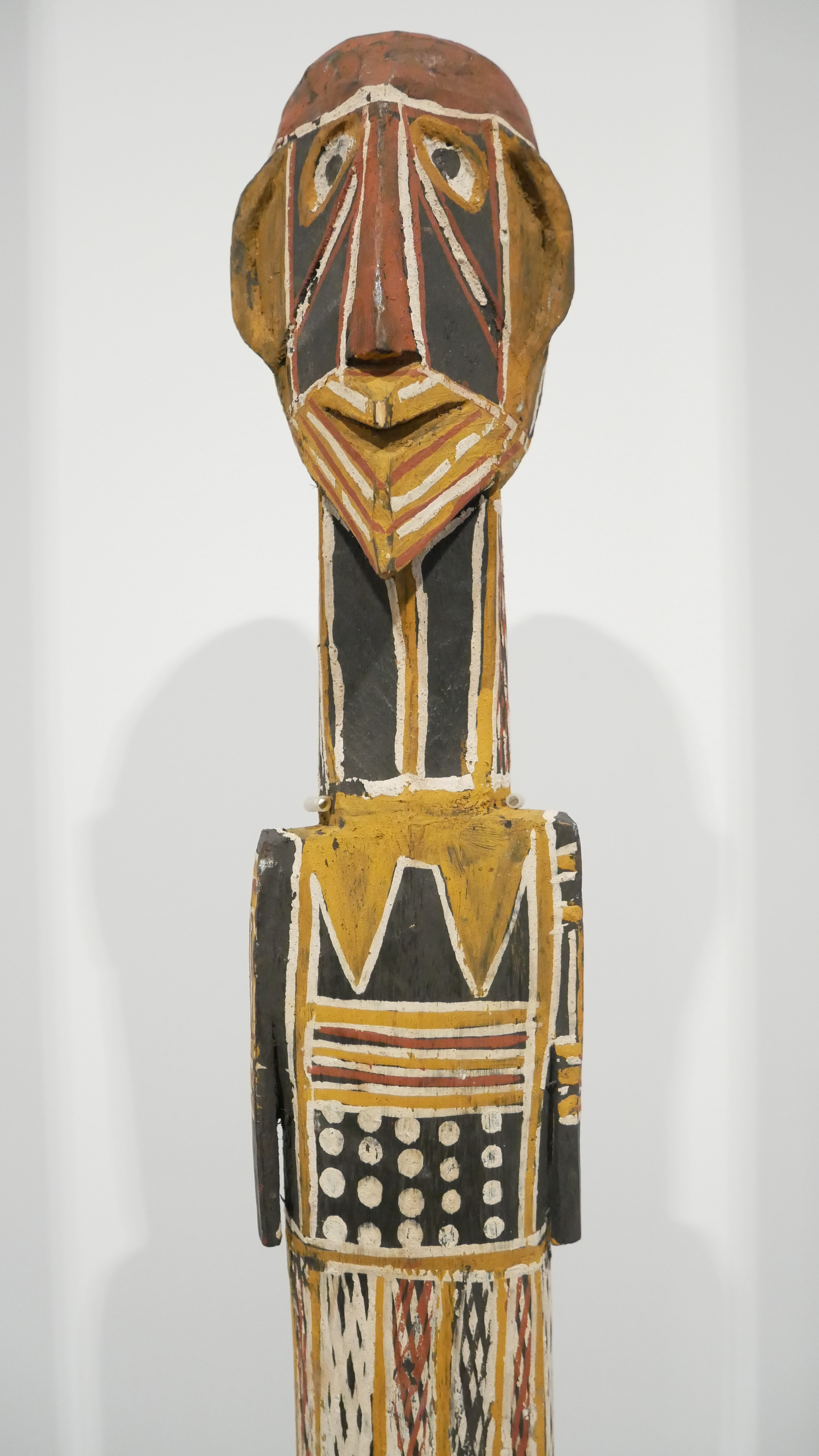
A woodcarving of female spirit collected at Yirrkala

Yirrkala is home to a number of leading Indigenous artists, whose traditional Aboriginal art, particularly bark painting, can be found in art galleries around the world, and whose work frequently wins awards such as the Telstra National Aboriginal and Torres Strait Islander Art Awards. Their work is visible to the public at the Buku-Larrnggay Mulka Art Centre and Museum and also at the YBE art centre. Pioneer bark painters from this region who the National Museum of Australia consider old masters include Mithinarri Gurruwiwi, Birrikitji Gumana and Mawalan Marika.

It is also a traditional home of the Yidaki (didgeridoo), and some of the world's finest didgeridoos are still made at Yirrkala.

=== Buku-Larrnggay Mulka Centre ===
The Buku-Larrnggay Mulka Centre, formerly Buku-Larrŋgay Arts, is a world-renowned art centre, with well-known artists such as Nyapanyapa Yunupingu based there. It is often referred to as Buku for short.

There is a stage called the Roy Marika Stage at the centre, which is used for the annual Yarrapay Festival. The festival's June 2021 iteration was directed by Witiyana Marika, and featured the Andrew Gurruwiwi Band, Yothu Yindi, Yirrmal, and East Journey.

The centre was established by local artists in the old Mission health centre in 1976, after the missionaries had left and as the Aboriginal land rights and Homeland movements gathered pace.

The historic Yirrkala Church Panels were created in 1963 by Yolngu elders of the Dhuwa moiety (including Mawalan Marika, Wandjuk Marika and Mithinarri Gurruwiwi), who painted one sheet with their major ancestral narratives and clan designs, and eight elders of the Yirritja moiety, including Mungurrawuy Yunupingu, Birrikitji Gumana and Narritjin Maymuru, who painted the other sheet with Yirritja designs. They were discarded by the church in 1974, but were salvaged by Buku-Larrnggay in 1978.

As of 2015 it represented more than 300 artists from around the homelands, and exhibitions of work by the artists were being shown across Australia and internationally. As of 2020, the centre comprises two divisions: the Yirrkala Art Centre, which represents the artists exhibiting and selling contemporary art, and The Mulka Project, which incorporates the museum. It is known for its production of bark paintings, weaving in natural fibres, larrakitj (memorial poles), yidaki, and many other forms of art.

The centre has been a base for several major artists, including Gulumbu Yunupingu, Banduk Marika, Gunybi Ganambarr, Djambawa Marawili, and Yanggarriny Wunungmurra. Women artists who have worked at the centre include five sisters: Nancy Gaymala Yunupingu, Gulumbu Yunupingu, Barrupu Yunupingu, Nyapanyapa Yunupingu, and Eunice Djerrkngu Yunupingu; as well as Dhuwarrwarr Marika; Malaluba Gumana; Naminapu Maymuru-White; Nonggirrnga Marawili; Dhambit Mununggurr; and Margaret Wirrpanda.

== Education ==
At Yirrkala School, formerly Yirrkala Community School, renamed "Yirrkala Community Education Centre" or "Yirrkala CEC" after it became a location of one of the trial Community Education Centres (CEC) in 1988, students undertake a method of bilingual studies dubbed "both ways", incorporating a cultural curriculum called Galtha Rom, meaning cultural lessons. Despite a 2009 Northern Territory Government order to teach English for the first four hours each day, the school continued to teach in its own way, with the child's first language, Yolngu Matha, taught alongside English. The method has proven effective against reducing the drop-out rate, and in 2020 eight students were the first in their community to graduate year 12 with scores enabling them to attend university. Yirrkala School and its sister school, Laynhapuy Homelands School, are now being looked to as models for learning in remote traditional communities.

=== Yalmay Marika Yunupingu ===
Artist and teacher-linguist Yalmay Marika Yunupingu, also known as Yalmay Yunupingu Marika (sometimes hyphenated) or just Yalmay Yunupingu (born c. 1955), is one member of the famous Marika family of north-east Arnhem Land, and is the daughter of artist Mathaman Marika and the sister of artist, cultural leader and environmentalist Dr B Marika. She was married to former Yothu Yindi lead singer and educator Dr M Yunupingu (1956–2013).

She has translated children's books into Yolngu Matha languages, and taught "both ways" bilingual education for her whole career, standing firm against Northern Territory Government policies which dictated that NT schools should teach only in the English language in 1998. This was despite the fact that Yirrkala School had been identified as the first to undergo bilingual accreditation in 1980, and bilingual students outperformed the non-bilingual students.

Yunupingu was appointed senior teacher at the school in 2004, and has often been called "mother of the school", and became known for her mentoring of other teachers. She was awarded the Northern Territory Government's Teaching Excellence Award in the Remote Primary category for her work at Yirrkala, and her artwork has featured in exhibitions in Australia and the US. She has also been an honorary fellow at Charles Darwin University.

She retired in early 2023 after 40 years at the school, with family, friends, colleagues and other community members gathering to celebrate her contribution. Since retirement, she has been teaching traditional healing with bush medicines.

On 25 January 2024 she was announced as 2024 Senior Australian of the Year and travelled to Canberra to accept the award.

== Heritage listings ==
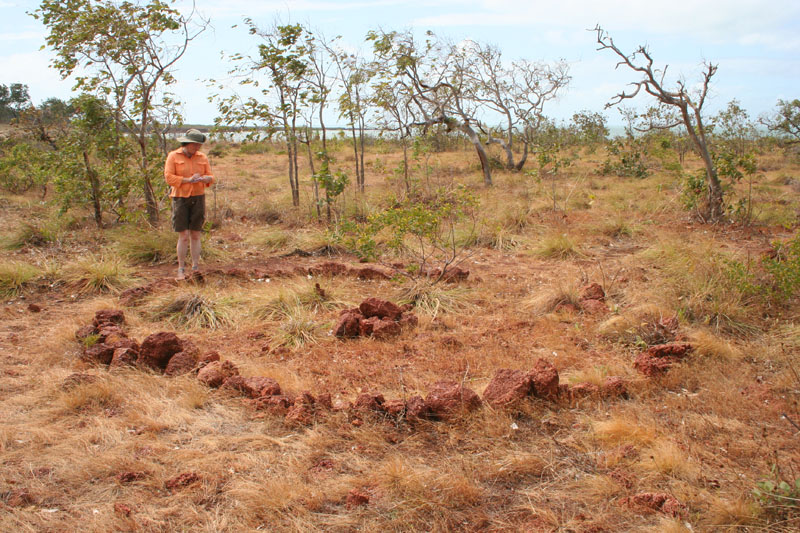
One of the Wurrwurrwuy stone arrangements

Yirrkala has a number of heritage-listed sites, including:

- Wurrwurrwuy stone arrangements

== In film ==
Ethnographic filmmaker Ian Dunlop filmed extensively over 12 years at Yirrkala, forming close working relationships with leaders and artists there, including Narritjin Maymuru, Dundiwuy Wanambi, and Mawalan Marika. He was respected by artist and land rights activist Roy Marika, who explained the importance of his films to other Yolngu elders. Dunlop left 27 of his films with the community. The Yirrkala Film Project was the name given to a series of 22 films, running for 1,271 minutes in total, filmed between 1970 and 1982. In 1971, Dunlop made In Memory of Mawalan, a black and white film with cinematography by Dean Semler. The background to the film is the story of the Djang’kawu sisters, a Rirratjingu clan creation story that laid out the law for the people, which was ignored when the government gave permission for a bauxite mining company to start developing operations in east Arnhem Land. Artist and elder Mawalan Marika, who had been a creator of and signatory to the Yirrkala bark petitions, died in 1967. In 1971, his eldest son Wandjuk Marika planned a ceremony as a celebration of his father and as a re-affirmation of Djang’kawu Law, and In Memory of Mawalan is a film of the ceremony. Wandjuk documented the film for the filmmakers as they were filming. The film was released in 1983.

== Notable people ==
- Timmy Burarrwanga, businessman and cultural leader
- Raphael Clarke (1985-), Australian rules footballer
- Gatjil Djerrkura (1949–2004), ceremonial leader
- Nathan Djerrkura (1988–), Australian rules footballer
- Nonggirrnga Marawili (c.1938), painter
- Banduk Marika (1954–2021), artist
- Kathy Balngayngu Marika (1957–), dancer
- Raymattja Marika (c.1959–2008), scholar, educator, linguist and cultural advocate
- Roy Marika (1925–1993), councillor and artist
- Wandjuk Marika (1927–1987), artist, actor, Indigenous rights activist
- Yirrmal Marika (1993–), Australian singer
- Maminydjama Maymuru (1997–), model
- Wukun Wanambi
- Kwame Yeboah (born 1994 in Yirrkala), professional soccer player for the Western Sydney Wanderers
- Yothu Yindi (1986–2000), rock band
- Galarrwuy Yunupingu (1948–2023), land rights activist and chair, Northern Land Council
- Mandawuy Yunupingu (1956–2013), musician and educator
- Nyapanyapa Yunupingu (c.1945–2021), painter
