= Edgar Wells =

Methodist missionary in Australia (1908–1995)

Edgar Almond Wells (4 September 1908 – 4 May 1995) was an Australian minister in the Methodist church. He is known for his work as superintendent of the Aboriginal mission at Yirrkala, Arnhem Land, in the Northern Territory of Australia in the early 1960s, when the Yirrkala church panels and the Yirrkala bark petitions were created.

== Early life and education ==
Edgar Almond Wells was born on 4 September 1908 in Lincoln, England. He was the second son of nine children of James Robinson Wells, who worked in insurance but was also a Methodist lay preacher, and Elizabeth Agnes Wells (née Sayers).

After leaving school Wells worked with an iron, steel, and metal merchant on farm machinery. After being sentenced to a twelve-month good behaviour bond for theft at the age of 17, he migrated to Australia. He became active in the local Methodist church near Cleveland, Queensland while working on farms, and was appointed as a probationary minister at Yeppoon in 1930.

He did three years of theological training at King's College in Brisbane, before doing a stint serving at Enoggera. He was ordained in March 1936.

== Career ==
Wells was first posted to Camooweal, Queensland, where he met his wife, Annie Bishop.

Serving first in Townsville during the Second World War, he then enlisted as a nursing orderly for the RAAF in July 1942, but was discharged a few months later to take the position of a Young Men's Christian Association welfare officer attached to the RAAF base in Darwin in the Northern Territory.

In 1944 Wells was posted to North Rockhampton and then Crows Nest in Queensland. After the war, he and Annie trained for missionary work in Sydney, including in anthropology under A. P. Elkin.

In January 1950, he was appointed as superintendent and Annie as nursing sister at Milingimbi Island, an island in the Crocodile Islands group off the coast of Arnhem Land. The mission was run by the Methodist Overseas Mission (MOM) from its foundation in 1923 until 1974. As Thomas Theodor Webb (1885-1948) before him, Wells became interested in the art of the Yolngu people not only for the income it brought to the mission when sold, but also as means of to understand better the Indigenous people's culture. The Musée d'ethnographie de Genève in Switzerland holds a wooden carving of a cormorant (wurran), a clan totem collected by Wells. He encouraged the creation of bark paintings and other crafts which were made available for sale. During their time there, assisted by a Commonwealth grant, a school and a hospital were built. He respected the local culture, and used the local Gupapuyngu language in the school and in church services. Ann worked in the dispensary and store, and started writing children's stories based on Aboriginal myths. In 1963, she published an account of their ten years spent at Milingimbi. At Milingimbi, Wells worked with Harry Makarrwaḻa Munyarryun (c.1896–1951), leader of the Wanggurri clan of the Yirritja moiety who, with his brother Djalatjiri, sailed across to Sulawesi and traded with the Macassans. Munyarryun converted to Christianity and became a missionary himself, and was known as a peacemaker. Wells wrote in praise of Munyarryun's leadership and insights. (Note: Wes Lanhupuy, the first Yolngu Member of the NT Legislative Assembly was the son of Munyarryun' brother Batangga. Other members of his family include ATSIC chairman Gatjil Djerrkura, and AFL footballer Gary Dhurrkay.)

Around 1960, Wells was appointed superintendent minister at Coolangatta in Queensland, but in 1961 the couple returned to Arnhem Land, with Wells as superintendent at Yirrkala mission, an Aboriginal reserve on the eastern coast of the Gove Peninsula, run by MOM since 1935, which became home to Aboriginal people from 13 different clans. During the Wellses' time there, the Yirrkala church panels were created for the new church, which opened in July 1963. Art collectors from Sydney and Melbourne visited in 1962, and sales of the artworks increased. In February 1963 Prime Minister Robert Menzies approved special leases for the mining of bauxite and construction of a refinery on the Gove Peninsula, On 9 May 1963, Wells held a public meeting at which he read and explained the proclamation by the Governor-General announcing the excision of land from the reserve as well as other land for the new mining lease. The Yolngu leaders were annoyed and insulted at the lack of consultation, and concerned that the miners would disturb their sacred sites. Wells sent telegrams to Methodist Church leaders, newspaper editors, the leader of the Labor Party Opposition, and various others in protest. Leaders of the various Yolngu clans created the Yirrkala bark petitions and presented them to the House of Representatives in August 1963. Sources vary as to how much Edgar and Ann Wells helped to draft the text of the petitions, which were written in both Yolngu Matha and English, but in her 2024 book about the panels, historian Clare Wright recorded that the panels were "an act of political syncretism", created by the Yolngu "parliament" under their system of rom and madayin, concepts in Yolngu customary law. Ann typed them up. The paper petitions were attached to sheets of bark with painted borders which were adorned with images of local fish and animals.

Wells's superiors in the church hierarchy, in particular the secretary general of the Methodist Overseas Mission, Cecil Gribble, were not pleased with his involvement in the petitions, for which he had not obtained their permission, and ordered him back to Milingimbi. In December 1963, Labor MP Gordon Bryant (who had been an advocate for the Yolngu people and the petitions) tried to have Wells reinstated by approaching the Speaker of the House of Representatives, but Gribble insisted that Wells had chosen to return to his home state of Queensland, and time ran out of that sitting of Parliament before considering Bryant's opinion. Ann and Edgar Wells left Yirrkala on the Wednesday mail plane on 1 January 1964. They were fondly remembered by those who were children during this period.

He declined the new posting, and returned to Queensland, where he served as a circuit minister near Brisbane before retiring in 1974.

== Later life and death ==
Wells and his wife retired to Hervey Bay, Queensland, in 1974. He undertook further study at the University of Queensland, graduating with a BA in 1978, and 1982 published his account of the events at Yirrkala, titled Reward and Punishment in Arnhem Land, 1962-1963. He framed his story as a clash of cultures, and believed that his actions were justifiable, and the church's retribution reprehensible.

Annie died in 1979, and Wells moved to Melbourne sometime after her death. In 1980, he encouraged Arthur Ellemor to donate his correspondence to the archives.

Wells died on 4 May 1995 at Balwyn, Melbourne, and was cremated.

== Personal life ==
Wells married Ann Elizabeth Bishop (known as Annie) who was born in 1906 in London, and was educated to tertiary level. She was practising as a nursing sister at Mount Isa, Queensland, when they met. They married at the Chermside Methodist Church, Brisbane, on 14 February 1939.

Ann Wells was a prolific author of children's and adult fiction and non-fiction, with many of her books based in Arnhem Land, including her autobiography Milingimbi : ten years in the Crocodile Islands of Arnhem Land (1963). In 1971 her book This is Their Dreaming: Legends of the Panels of Aboriginal Art in the Yirrkala Church, which provides detailed descriptions of the Yirrkala Church Panels, was published by the University of Queensland. She published only one work after leaving Yirrkala, Forests Are Their Temples (1979).

Ann died on 24 December 1979 at Point Vernon, Queensland.
