= Nabalco =

Former Australian mining and extraction company

- Industry: Mining, mineral extraction
- Founded: 1964
- Defunct: 2002
- Successor: Alcan Gove Pty Ltd (2002)
- Products: Bauxite, aluminium

Nabalco (North Australian Bauxite and Alumina Company) was an Australian mining and extraction company set up in 1964 to exploit bauxite reserves in northern Australia. The company was renamed Alcan Gove Pty Ltd in 2002, becoming part of Alcan.

== History ==
The North Australian Bauxite and Alumina Company, known as Nabalco, was a mining and extraction company set up in 1964 to exploit bauxite reserves in Australia. It was formed from a consortium which included the Swiss-based Alusuisse (70%) and the Australian company CSR Limited.

After the French company GOMINCO had earlier in 1963 started staking out its claims around the Yirrkala mission on the Gove Peninsula, Arnhem Land, in the Northern Territory, the extent of the development was challenged by the traditional owners of the land, the Gumatj and Rirratjiŋu clans of the Yolngu peoples, a grouping of Aboriginal Australians. The Yolngu people who lived on the reserve created a set of petitions known as the Yirrkala bark petitions, which they submitted to the Australian Parliament in August 1963 to protest the lack of consultation with the First Peoples of that area before staking their claims. In 1964, the Menzies government granted the central SML1 lease to Nabalco to develop mines on the Gove Peninsula. In 1965, after the French company GOMINCO pulled out of its involvement in Gove, its leases (SMLs 2, 3, and 4) were transferred to Nabalco. Country Party MP Charles Barnes, who was a member of the Select Committee into the Grievances of the Yirrkala People, was appointed chairman of Nabalco's board. The Committee had formed after the people had submitted the bark petitions to Parliament.

Eventually the Yolngu took legal action, known as Milirrpum v Nabalco Pty Ltd, or, more commonly, the Gove Land Rights Case). The court ruled against intrinsic native land rights in 1971, but the petitions and the court case were landmarks in the history of Indigenous land rights in Australia and native title in Australia.

Nabalco was renamed Alcan Gove Pty Ltd in 2002, becoming part of Alcan, (now Rio Tinto Alcan).
