= Dhukal Wirrpanda =

Artist and cultural advocate

- Born: 1957 (age 68–69); North East Arnhem Land, Northern Territory
- Known for: Bark painting; Wood carving; Ochre painting
- Notable work: Mana and Wan'kawu (before 1986); Dhangultji at Dhuruputjpi (1996); Djapu Turtle Hunt (1998); Gapuwarriku at Lutumba (1997-98); Dhakiyarr Wirrpanda's Wukidi Memorial Larrakitj (2003); Wukidi Tsunami (2005); Wukidi ga Yingapungapu I (2005); Wukidi (2005); Mana at Garranyirri (2006); Wukidi (2007); Yalata (2017); Yalata (date unknown); Nyapalingu Wapitja Pair (date unknown)
- Movement: Indigenous Australian art; Yolŋu art (Dhudi-Djapu clan)
- Spouse: Galuma Maymuru (died 2018)
- Children: Liyawaday Wirrpanda (daughter); Marikuku Wirrpanda (son); Bandarr Wirrpanda (son)
- Father: Djungi Wirrpanda
- Relatives: Dhakiyarr Wirrpanda (grandfather, father in Yolŋu terms)

Dhukal Wirrpanda (born 1957) is a Yolŋu elder and artist from the Dhudi-Djapu clan in North East Arnhem Land (associated with the Baniyala and Dhuruputjpi homelands).

Dhukal Wirrpanda is the grandson (son in Yolŋu terms) of Dhakiyarr Wirrpanda, the Yolŋu leader at the centre of the landmark High Court of Australia case Tuckiar v The King (1934). Dhukal Wirrpanda is the protagonist and narrator of the documentary film Dhakiyarr vs The King. Nine ceremonial larrakitj (hollow-log coffins) that Wirrpanda painted, along with seven other elders, were permanently installed in the foyer of Supreme Court of the Northern Territory during a Wukidi (reconciliation) ceremony at the end of the film. He continues to advocate for Indigenous rights, reconciliation, and official recognition of historic Aboriginal deaths in custody.

== Early life ==
Dhukal Wirrpanda was born in 1957 (some records cite 1955) to his father, Djungi. He was born in North East Arnhem Land, Northern Territory, and raised on his ancestral Dhudi-Djapu clan homelands in Dhuruputjpi, approximately 200 kilometres southwest of Yirrkala. Since the 1980s he has lived, worked and exhibited alongside his late wife, Galuma Maymuru.

== Artistic methods and themes ==
Dhukal Wirrpanda works include bark painting, wood carving and ceremonial larrakitj (hollow-log coffins) using natural earth pigments (ochres) sourced from his ancestral lands. His artistic practice is deeply connected with the Dhudi-Djapu clan's ancestral stories, sacred ceremonies and knowledge of country in North East Arnhem Land.

A portion of his mature practice centres on the Wukidi series, which depicts ancient narratives integral to Dhudi-Djapu ceremonies. In Wukidi Tsunami (2005), the ancestral hunters Balurruwuy and Yangamawuy were swept inland by a catastrophic wave and transformed into standing stone pillars at the mortuary ground known as Wukidi.

Wirrpanda's art practice also engages deeply with sea country and maritime ecologies. In his contribution to the Saltwater collection, Gapuwarriku at Lutumba (1997-98), Wirrpanda depicts turtle hunters who successfully return with their catch. Anthropologist Howard Morphy noted that Wirrpanda uses the imagery of the turtle shell, the connecting rope and the cleansing tide as a rich metaphor for Yolŋu mortuary ceremonies and the renewal of life.

== Exhibitions ==
Dhukal Wirrpanda's early exhibition history includes participation in the 1984 Baniyala Artworks showcase at the Crafts Council Gallery in Sydney.

Alongside his late wife, fellow artist Galuma Maymuru, Wirrpanda co-created Dhangultji at Dhuruputjpi in 1996, an intricately carved and painted wooden brolga that reflects the sacred ecology and ownership of their clan lands. The sculpture was included in the 1998-99 Objects from the collection exhibtion and the 2005 Yolŋu power: the art of Yirrkala exhibition, both at Art Gallery of New South Wales.

In 1997, he was featured in the landmark exhibition Native Title: Yirrkala Bark Paintings at the Museum of Contemporary Art Australia in Sydney, which was part of the Festival of the Dreaming. The exhibition highlighted a long history of land rights intersecting with customary law and contemporary bark painting.

In 1998, Wirrpanda's bark paintings Djapu Turtle Hunt and Gapuwarriku at Lutumba were exhibited in the Saltwater: Yirrkala Bark Paintings of Sea Country alongside artworks from 46 other Yolŋu artists. The exhibition toured nationally and included the Australian National Maritime Museum in Sydney, the Museum of Modern Art at Heide in Melbourne and the Araluen Centre in Alice Springs. The 80 paintings in the exhibition were created to recognise Indigenous sea rights and coastal ownership, and in response to an illegal fishing intrusion at Garranali. The severed head of a crocodile was found in the sacred area, which is home to the ancestral crocodile Baru.

Also in 1998, Wirrpanda and Galuma Maymuru held a joint exhibition titled In Memory of Narritjin – Bark Paintings and Carvings at the William Mora Gallery in Melbourne.

In 2000, Wirrpanda and Galuma Maymuru's collaborative carved sculpture Nyapalingu Wapitja Pair was exhibited at the 2000 Olympic Arts Festival in Sydney.

In 2003, he was exhibited in the group showcase Buwayak (Invisibility) at Annandale Galleries in Sydney, which focused on the spiritual and cultural presence of Yolŋu art.

In 2025, he was featured in Yolŋu Power: The Art of Yirrkala at the Art Gallery of New South Wales, which celebrated the enduring power and political agency of Yirrkala artistic traditions.

In addition to group exhibitions, Wirrpanda's commercial exhibition history includes Yolngu Bark at the Ben Grady Gallery in Canberra (2001), a dual showcase with Galuma Maymuru at Framed Darwin Gallery (2002), and Arnhem Land Ochres at Mina Mina Art Gallery in Brunswick Heads (2006).

Internationally, Wirrpanda’s work has been featured in European exhibitions, including the group showcase Sillage held at Arts d’Australie in Paris in 2022.

== Collections ==
Dhukal Wirrpanda's bark paintings and ceremonial larrakitj (hollow-log coffins) are held in major public collections both in Australia and internationally.

The Australian National Maritime Museum, Sydney, holds Djapu Turtle Hunt (1998) and Gapuwarriku at Lutumba (1998) as part of the permanent collection.

The British Museum, London holds Mana and Wan'kawu – shark and freshwater goanna at Dhurruputjpi (1986). In 2018, the museum loaned this bark painting to the Deutsches Hygiene-Museum in Dresden, Germany, for the international exhibition Shine on Me: The Sun and Us.

The Art Gallery of New South Wales, Sydney, holds the collaborative sculpture Dhangultji at Dhuruputjpi (1996), created with Galuma Maymuru.

The Queensland Art Gallery and Gallery of Modern Art, Brisbane, holds Wukidi ga Yingapungapu I (2005).

The Supreme Court of the Northern Territory, Darwin, has nine ceremonial larrakitj (hollow-log coffins) in its foyer. These were permanently installed in 2003 during a Wukidi (reconciliation) ceremony to guide home the spirit of Dhakiyarr Wirrpanda and heal historic wounds. The larrakitj were prepared by Dhakiyarr's descendants Dhukal Wirrpanda and Wuyal Wirrpanda (Dhudi-Djapu clan), as well as Gawirrin Gumana AO (Dhalwangu clan), Djambawa Marawili AM (Madarrpa clan), Miniyawany Yunupingu (Gumatj clan), Menja Munungurr (Djapu clan), Wanyubi Marika (Rirratjiŋu clan) and Wukun Wanambi (Marrakulu clan).

The JW Kluge Collection at the University of Virginia, United States, holds commissioned works.

The National Gallery of Australia in Canberra, the National Gallery of Victoria in Melbourne, and the Kerry Stokes Collection in Perth all hold Wirrpanda's artworks.

== Awards ==
Between 1996 and 2005, Dhukal Wirrpanda's work was selected multiple times for inclusion in the prestigious Telstra National Aboriginal & Torres Strait Islander Art Awards at the Museum and Art Gallery of the Northern Territory in Darwin (in 1996, 1997, 1998 and 2005).

== Publications ==
Dhukal Wirrpanda's artwork and cultural contributions are featured in key exhibition catalogues and texts on Indigenous Australian art.

In 1999, Saltwater: Yirrkala Bark Paintings of Sea Country: Recognising Indigenous Sea Rights was published by Buku-Larrŋgay Mulka Centre in association with Jennifer Isaacs. The book contains 80 bark paintings from 47 Yolŋu artists, including Dhukal Wirrpanda. The paintings were created to educate white people after the sacred crocodile nest site of the Madarrpa clan in Blue Mud Bay was desecrated by 'outside' barramundi fishermen in 1996.

In 1999, Art from the Land: Dialogues with the Kluge-Ruhe Collection of Australian Aboriginal Art, edited by Howard Morphy and Margo Smith Boles, was published by the University of Virginia.

In 1999, Spirit Country: Contemporary Australian Aboriginal Art, by Jennifer Isaacs, was published by Fine Arts Museums.

In 2007, Galuma Maymuru, Dhukal Wirrpanda: Bark Paintings and Ceremonial Poles, written by Galuma Maymuru and Dhukal Wirrpanda and with introduction by Bill Gregory, was published by Annandale Galleries in association with Buku-Larrŋgay Mulka Centre.

In 2014, Saltwater: Paintings of Sea Country: The Recognition of Indigenous Sea Rights, edited by Jennifer Isaacs, was published by Buku-Larrŋgay Mulka Centre.

In 2022, Mad̲ayin: Waltjan̲ ga Waltjan̲buy Yolnuwu Miny'tji Yirrkalawuy = Eight Decades of Aboriginal Australian Bark Painting from Yirrkala was published by the Kluge-Ruhe Aboriginal Art Collection of the University of Virginia. The exhibition book contains 90 bark paintings from Yolŋu artists, including Wirrpanda. Notably, prior to the arrival of Europeans, Yolŋu artists painted their bodies and ceremonial objects with sacred and ancestral designs. The exhibition book showcases how the artists have transformed their ancient designs into contemporary statements.

In 2025, Yolŋu Power: The Art of Yirrkala, edited by Cara Pinchbeck, was published by the Art Gallery of New South Wales. The exhibition looked at moments in Yirrkala’s history when "artists have changed art-making for a very particular reason – whether through the adoption of new materials, or in response to social, political or cultural imperatives".

== Advocacy for Dhakiyarr Wirrpanda ==
Dhukal Wirrpanda is a direct descendant and successor clan leader of Dhakiyarr Wirrpanda, a Dhudi-Djapu leader who disappeared in 1934 following his release from Darwin's Fannie Bay Gaol after his murder conviction was overturned by the High Court of Australia in Tuckiar v The King.

=== 2002 audio documentary ===
In 2002, Wirrpanda met Sydney academic Tom Murray, who was visiting Arnhem Land.

Wirrpanda wanted to hold a traditional funeral ceremony for Dhakiyarr, which in Yolŋu culture is important because, as Wirrpanda explained, "all of the bones and strength and spirit of a person flows back into the land".

Murray worked with Wirrpanda to produce a radio documentary titled Dhakiyarr vs the King and Territory, which was broadcast on Hindsight, ABC Radio National's social impact program (and again in 2013).

The audio documentary, focused on the family and their pain, drew attention to the case. Murray assisted Wirrpanda to record a video letter, so they could make their case in their own words to the Chief Minister of the Northern Territory, Clare Martin.

In the video letter, Dhukal requested the return of Dhakiyarr's remains or permission to hold a formal reconciliation ceremony at the Supreme Court of the Northern Territory in Darwin. Martin agreed to the request and facilitated access for the historic Wukidi (reconciliation) ceremony to take place at the Supreme Court.

=== 2004 documentary film ===
With the reconciliation ceremony set to take place, Murray partnered with co-director Allan Collins and Dhakiyarr's family to develop a feature-length documentary film.

The documentary film Dhakiyarr vs The King examines the historical intersection between Yolŋu customary law and the Australian legal system through the experiences of the Wirrpanda and McColl families. Dhukal Wirrpanda served as one of the protagonists and narrators for the film.

Scenes from the reconciliation ceremony form the climax of the film. In June 2003, more than 200 Yolŋu people followed in Dhakiyarr's "footsteps" (as described in the film), from Arnhem Land to Darwin, to restore Dhakiyarr's honour and confront historical injustices. They were joined by 30 descendants of Albert McColl, the policeman Dhakiyarr speared seventy years before, as well as Chief Minister Martin, judges from the Northern Territory Supreme Court and the High Court of Australia.

Nine ceremonial larrakitj (hollow-log coffins) were permanently installed in the foyer of Supreme Court of the Northern Territory to guide Dhakiyarr's spirit home to his ancestral land and to heal the wounds cause by this historic event. The larrakitj were prepared by Dhukal Wirrpanda along with prominent Yolŋu artists and clan leaders, including Wuyal Wirrpanda (Dhudi-Djapu clan), Gawirrin Gumana AO (Dhalwangu clan), Djambawa Marawili AM (Madarrpa clan), Miniyawany Yunupingu (Gumatj clan), Menja Munungurr (Djapu clan), Wanyubi Marika (Rirratjiŋu clan) and Wukun Wanambi (Marrakulu clan). It was in the Supreme Court of the Northern Territory where Dhakiyarr was once made 'invisible'. Or, as Wirrpanda described it, where "they treated him like a man without a footprint".

=== Release and reception ===
The film screened and broadcast internationally, and won two awards.

Opening the film at Federation Square in Melbourne, Dhukal and Wuyul Wirrpanda declared it to be "the film that they had always wanted to make," reflecting on the film's role as an Indigenous-led vehicle for truth and historical reconciliation.

The Sydney Morning Herald described the film as a "powerful piece of work" and acknowledged that "one of the film's biggest strengths is that it lets the Wirrpandas tell their own story". The Sydney Morning Herald also noted that a defining stylistic choice of the film is that it is "told entirely in the words of the Yolngu people, unmediated by a narrator" and the approach as "oblique and non-linear, informed by mythology and a world view that might not make immediate sense to white viewers". The Herald concluded that "it is a fitting way to tell a story that is about a clash of cultures".

=== 2025 coronial inquiry ===
Following Northern Territory coronial findings into Dhakiyarr's disappearance handed down in early 2025, Wirrpanda and his family expressed disappointment over the coroner's decision not to hold a formal inquest or invite submissions from Indigenous family members. Legal scholars noted that despite findings that Dhakiyarr was not "in care or custody" at the time of his disappearance, he remained under state care at the Kahlin Aboriginal Compound when he went missing.

=== New investigation commenced in 2025 and is ongoing ===
Wirrpanda has continued public campaigns calling for official accountability, wanting Dhakiyarr's death to be recognised as an Aboriginal death in custody. Alongside fellow clan leader Djambawa Marawili, he has also advocated for the Northern Territory government to establish a reconciliation centre in Dhakiyarr's name to foster cross-cultural understanding between Yolŋu and non-Indigenous Australians.

In December 2025, Northern Territory police announced a new investigation into the mysterious disappearance of Dhakiyarr Wirrpanda.

=== Educational adoption and legal impact ===
The High Court decision in Tuckiar v The King and its subsequent appeal remain a foundational case study in Australian legal education, widely taught across law faculties to illustrate principles of procedural fairness, legal ethics, the presumption of innocence, and the duties of counsel.

The documentary film Dhakiyarr vs The King, featuring Wirrpanda as lead protagonist and narrator, has been adopted as a foundational educational resource across Australian law faculties and by professional legal bodies, including the New South Wales Bar Association for professional education in legal ethics and Indigenous rights.

Wirrpanda continues to present his family's history to legal audiences. For a recent film screening with the NSW Bar Association, he travelled several hours from his remote homeland at Dhuruputjpi to the community of Baniyala in East Arnhem Land in order to access a reliable communications link and address event attendees directly via a video link.

== See also ==
- Yolŋu
- Bark painting
- Yirrkala bark petitions
- Dhakiyarr Wirrpanda
- Tuckiar v The King court case
- Dhakiyarr vs The King narrated by Dhukal Wirrpanda
