= Dhakiyarr vs The King =

Australian documentary film

- Film poster for Dhakiyarr vs The King featuring descendants of Dhakiyarr Wirrpanda, a Yolŋu man and a leader of the Dhudi-Djapu clan
- Directed by: Tom Murray; Allan Collins
- Written by: Tom Murray
- Based on: Tuckiar v The King (1934 Australian High Court Case)
- Produced by: Graeme Isaac; Anna Grieve
- Starring: Ted Egan; Djambawa Marawili; Wakuthi Marawili; Gawaratj Munungurr; Waka Munungurra; Dhukal Wirrpanda; Mulkun Wirrpanda; Wuyal Wirrpanda; Galawarriwuy Wunnungmurra
- Cinematography: Allan Collins
- Edited by: James Bradley
- Music by: Alister Spence
- Production companies: Film Australia; Australian Broadcasting Corporation; CAAMA Productions
- Distributed by: National Film and Sound Archive of Australia
- Release dates: June 2004 (Sydney Film Festival); January 2005 (Sundance Film Festival)
- Running time: 56 minutes
- Country: Australia
- Languages: English; Yolŋu Matha

Dhakiyarr vs The King is a 2004 Australian documentary film documenting the controversial murder trial (Tuckiar v The King) and subsequent disappearance in 1934 of Dhakiyarr Wirrpanda, a Yolŋu man and a leader of the Dhudi-Djapu clan of Blue Mud Bay in Arnhem Land. The film was directed by Tom Murray and Allan Collins.

== Synopsis ==
In 1933, on Woodah Island in remote north-east Arnhem Land, Dhakiyarr Wirrpanda speared a policeman, Constable Albert McColl. The spearing was permitted under Yolŋu law after the McColl chained four women and raped one of them (Djaparri Bulinjun Wirrpanda, who was Dhakiyarr's wife).

On the advice of missionaries, Dhakiyarr voluntarily went to Darwin to explain his actions and his people’s ways to the Northern Territory Supreme Court. Dhakiyarr was arrested, found guilty of murder at trial, and sentenced to death by hanging. He successfully appealed in the High Court of Australia, which ordered his release from prison, ruling that the trial had "seriously miscarried" due to systemic prejudice.

Following his release in Darwin, Dhakiyarr was never seen again, and his body has still not been found.

Seventy years after the disappearance of Yolŋu leader Dhakiyarr Wirrpanda, his descendants want to restore his honour and resolve the historical injustice. Ultimately, the film tells a story of two laws, two cultures, and two families coming to terms with the past.

== Themes ==
The film explores frontier history, Indigenous reconciliation, and social justice.

The film also explores the historical intersection and clash between Australian common law and Yolŋu customary law, centering on the landmark 1934 High Court appeal Tuckiar v The King. Through interviews with Dhakiyarr's descendants and archival research, the film explores the systemic failures of the original trial, the ongoing fight to restore his honour, and the broader historical context of frontier conflict and violence.

The title of the film hints at the central conflict: a collision of two laws and cultures. The name of the court case Tuckiar vs The King is based on a phonetic colonial corruption of Dhakiyarr's name (who is also referred to in paperwork as 'Tokia'). The film documents the collision of the two cultures and asks viewers to consider the Aboriginal perspective.

== Development ==
Co-director Tom Murray initially learned of Dhakiyarr's story while spending time in Arnhem Land. He met Dhakiyarr's grandson, Dhukal Wirrpanda, who in Yolŋu terms is regarded as Dhakiyarr's son. Dhukal had wanted to hold a traditional funeral ceremony for Dhakiyarr, which in Yolŋu culture is important because "all of the bones and strength and spirit of a person flows back into the land".

In 2002, Murray produced a radio documentary titled Tuckier (Dhakiyarr) v the King and Territory, which was broadcast on Hindsight, ABC Radio National's social impact program (and again in 2013).

The audio documentary, focused on the family and their pain, drew attention to the case. Murray assisted Dhukal, and another grandson (son) Wuyul Wirrpanda, to record a video letter addressed to the Chief Minister of the Northern Territory, Clare Martin.

Dhukal and the other senior Yolŋu leaders spoke so eloquently, I thought a video letter would allow them to make their case in their own way.

— Tom Murray, co-director

In the video letter, Dhukul Wirrpanda and Wuyul Wirrpanda requested the return of Dhakiyarr's remains or permission to hold a formal reconciliation ceremony at the Supreme Court of the Northern Territory in Darwin.

In a major gesture of support for Dhakiyarr's family. Martin agreed to the request and facilitated access for the historic Wukidi (reconciliation) ceremony to take place at the Supreme Court.

Following further research with Yolŋu elders in Arnhem Land, Murray partnered with co-director Allan Collins and Dhakiyarr's family to develop the documentary film.

Scenes from the reconciliation ceremony form the climax of the film. In June 2003, more than 200 Yolŋu people followed in Dhakiyarr's "footsteps" (as described in the film), from Arnhem Land to Darwin, to restore Dhakiyarr's honour and confront historical injustices. They were joined by 30 descendants of Albert McColl, the policeman Dhakiyarr speared seventy years before, as well as Chief Minister Martin, judges from the Northern Territory Supreme Court and the High Court of Australia.

Nine ceremonial larrakitj (hollow-log coffins) were permanently installed in the foyer of Supreme Court of the Northern Territory to guide Dhakiyarr's spirit home to his ancestral land and to heal the wounds cause by this historic event. The larrakitj were prepared by prominent Yolŋu artists and clan leaders, including Dhukal Wirrpanda and Wuyal Wirrpanda (Dhudi-Djapu clan), Gawirrin Gumana (Dhalwangu clan), Djambawa Marawili (Madarrpa clan), Miniyawany Yunupingu (Gumatj clan), Menja Munungurr (Djapu clan), Wanyubi Marika (Rirratjiŋu clan), and Wukun Wanambi (Marrakulu clan). It was in the Supreme Court of the Northern Territory where Dhakiyarr was once made 'invisible'. Or, as Wirrpanda described it, where "they treated him like a man without a footprint".

== Production ==
The film was produced through the Film Australia National Interest Program, with the assistance of the Central Australian Aboriginal Media Association and the Australian Broadcasting Corporation (ABC). It was made in close collaboration with the Dhuruputjpi and Yilpara communities of Blue Mud Bay in North East Arnhem Land.

== Distribution ==
The film premiered at the 2004 Sydney Film Festival and screened at the 2005 Sundance Film Festival, as well as a number of other international film festivals, including the Vancouver International Film Festival, the Taiwan International Ethnographic Film Festival, the London Australian Film Festival, the Dreamspeakers International Film Festival in Canada, and the 2005 Montreal First Peoples' Festival (run by the Terres en Vues association). The film was also screened at the 2005 International Public Television Screening Conference in San Francisco.

The film was broadcast on the Australian Broadcasting Corporation and streamed on ABC iview, and is also available on streaming service Kanopy and from the National Film and Sound Archive.

In France, the film is distributed for public screening and cinema exhibition by the association Documentaire sur grand écran.

== Critical response ==
A May 2004 review in The Sydney Morning Herald described the film as a "powerful piece of work" and acknowledged that "one of the film's biggest strengths is that it lets the Wirrpandas tell their own story". Another May 2004 review in The Sydney Morning Herald noted that a defining stylistic choice of the film is that it is "told entirely in the words of the Yolngu people, unmediated by a narrator". The review noted the approach as "oblique and non-linear, informed by mythology and a world view that might not make immediate sense to white viewers". However, the review concluded that "it is a fitting way to tell a story that is about a clash of cultures".

Tim O'Farrell of RealTime magazine described the film as being "structured as a mystery" and that the ceremony attended by the families of Dhakiyarr and McColl families was "poignant" and "a moving example of grassroots reconciliation". Also writing in RealTime, Lisa Stefanoff praised the film for its "sensitive empirical humanism" noting that the film "interrupts and revises non-Aboriginal narratives of Australian political, social and cultural history".

Sundance Film Festival programmers praised co-directors Tom Murray and Allan Collins for "an impressive directorial debut", describing how the film dutifully presents "questions that have gone unanswered for three generations", as well as "moments of stunning black and white cinematography contrasted with raw emotional intensity". Following the Sundance Film Festival, William Blizek, Michele Desmarais, and Paul Williams of the Journal of Religion and Film described Dhakiyarr vs The King as a "remarkable documentary and murder mystery" and "an impressive directorial debut from Tom Murray and Allan Collins". They also described the installation of the nine larrakitj (hollow log coffins) in the Supreme Court of the Northern Territory as a "transcendent moment for the tribe, for McColl's descendants, for court officials and for the viewer".

Ahead of the film's national broadcast on the ABC, Melbourne newspaper The Age noted that the film follows an "unusual chronology" and "it is not until more than halfway through the program that we find out what happened to the protagonist". With Dhukal and Wuyal Wirrpnda narrating, the "audience is teased along to the film's emotional climax". The review described how the film shows the "collision of two justice systems – tribal and judicial", where "Yolgnu dancers in body paint face judges in wigs and gowns".

Regional First Nations media outlet Torres News described Dhakiyarr vs the King as "an inspiring story of remembrance and healing of two laws, two cultures and two families coming to terms with the past".

== Educational use ==
The 1934 High Court decision in Tuckiar v The King and the subsequent appeal remain a staple of Australian legal education, widely used in law schools to illustrate principles of procedural fairness, judicial impartiality, the presumption of innocence, the right of the defendant to remain silent, and the ethical responsibilities of counsel.

The film has also been used as an educational resource in universities and by the New South Wales Bar Association.

== Legacy ==
Dhakiyarr vs the King helped maintain awareness of the 1934 disappearance of Dhakiyarr and assisted with ongoing advocacy for him.

In March 2025, after a cold case investigation by the Northern Territory Police, the Northern Territory Coroner handed down a finding that Dhakiyarr died on or about 10 November 1934 but that the exact cause of death could not be determined due to the passage of time. Unsatisfied with the ruling, Dhakiyarr's descendants Dhukal Wirrpanda and Djambawa Marawili called on the Northern Territory Government to officially recognise the death as an Aboriginal death in custody, to locate Dhakiyarr's remains, and to establish a reconciliation centre in Dhakiyarr's name. In December 2025 Northern Territory police announced a new investigation into the mysterious disappearance of Dhakiyarr Wirrpanda.

Due to its documentation of the makarrata – a restorative justice process designed to facilitate healing after law-breaking trauma – the film continues to be featured in public reconciliation events. In January 2025 the film was screened at the Walyalup Fremantle Arts Centre as part of the City of Fremantle's Truth Telling program, FOCUS – First Nation Films. Co-director Tom Murray appeared as a guest speaker.

Since filming Dhakiyarr vs the King, Murray has maintained his relationship with the Wirrpanda family and supported their ongoing campaign through public commentary and academic advocacy.

"The Northern Territory didn’t do their job. They killed him. The police, their people, they did that. Where is the justice? I ask you to consider our pain and loss. The coroner is wrong in this. It is simple. We need honesty. It is over 90 years now and we still don’t have justice for our family."

— Dhukal Wirrpnda, 2026

== Awards ==
- Winner, Rouben Mamoulian Award, 2004 Sydney Film Festival
- Winner, 2004 NSW Premier's Audio/Visual History Prize
- Highly Commended, 2004 Human Rights Awards (Australia)
- Special Mention for an Outstanding Contribution to Australian Culture, Centre for Australian Cultural Studies

== See also ==
- Tuckiar v The King (1934 Australian High Court case)
