= Tom Murray (filmmaker) =

Australian film director and academic

- Notable work: Dhakiyarr vs the King (2004; co-director); In My Father's Country (2008; director); Love in Our Own Time (2013; co-director); Australia: The Wild Top End 3D (2019; co-writer); The Skin of Others (2020; director); Vaka Moana: Ancestors of the Future (2026; director)
- Title: Professor of Screen, Media and Creative Arts, Macquarie University; Australian Research Council Future Fellow; Founding and current Director, Creative Documentary Research Centre
- Awards: New South Wales Premier's History Awards (2004); Rouben Mamoulian Award (2004); Australian Directors' Guild Award (2008); Max Crawford Medal (2014); Screen Music Award (2020); ATOM Award for Best Docu-Drama (2021)

Tom Murray is an Australian documentary filmmaker and academic. His screen and audio documentary work primarily examines the history of colonialism, environmental history and Indigenous culture. As of 2026 he is a professor of screen media and creative arts and the founding director of the Creative Documentary Research Centre at Macquarie University in Sydney.

== Early life and education ==
Tom Murray graduated with a degree in politics and geography from the University of Sydney. He later completed his PhD at Macquarie University.

== Career ==
=== Films ===
Dhakiyarr vs the King (2004), co-directed by Murray along with Allan Collins, premiered at the Sydney Film Festival and was screened at the Sundance Film Festival. It is about the controversial 1934 murder trial and subsequent disappearance of Dhakiyarr Wirrpanda, who was a Yolŋu man and a leader of the Dhudi-Djapu clan from Blue Mud Bay in Arnhem Land. Dhakiyarr's body has still not been found, and his descendants want justice and to restore his honour. The film explores frontier history, legal precedent, indigenous reconciliation and social justice.

In My Father's Country (2008), directed by Murray, premiered at the Melbourne International Film Festival and screened at numerous festivals including International Documentary Film Festival Amsterdam, Palm Springs International Film Festival, the Environmental Film Festival in the Nation's Capital and the Taiwan International Ethnographic Film Festival. Made in collaboration with the Dhuruputjpi and Gangan communities of Blue Mud Bay in Arnhem Land, the film is about the coming-of-age ceremony of a boy in Arnhem Land. It offers an insight into "how a community practicing the oldest living culture in the world can assimilate new government policies and Eminem, while still upholding the laws of their ancestral country".

Love in Our Own Time (2013), co-directed by Murray and Madeleine Hetherton, screened at a number of international festivals and conferences and had Australian cinema screenings, often presented by NGO and government partners. The film follows seven ordinary Australian families at the beginning and ending of life. Mainly filmed at Calvary Hospital's in-patient palliative care unit in Sydney, the film examines what it is to be human in western society today.

The Skin of Others (2020), directed by Murray, premiered at the Sydney Film Festival. The film was screened on SBS World Movies and later made available to stream on SBS On Demand. It is about Douglas Grant, an Aboriginal World War I soldier. The film features Balang Tom E. Lewis, Archie Roach and Max Cullen (as Henry Lawson).

Vaka Moana: Ancestors of the Future(2026), directed by Murray premiered at the Melbourne International Film Festival. Made in collaboration with the Indigenous NGO Te Puna Marama Voyaging Foundation and featuring Pwo grand master navigator Peia Patai, the 360-degree film is about traditional Polynesian navigation and marine conservation in the Cook Islands.

The Mangatharra Road, which Murray started making in 2019, aims to challenge assumptions of pre-colonial isolation by demonstrating Indigenous Australia's connections to South-East Asian cultural and trading networks.

Murray has co-written a number of films including The Wild Top End 3D (2018), a work for IMAX directed by Nick Robinson which premiered at the Melbourne International Film Festival. Narrated by Balang Tom E. Lewis, the film is about the culture and wildlife of the Kimberley coast, Arnhem Land and the rainforest in Cape York.

He has also co-directed films in Indigenous communities. Two Brothers at Galarra ( 2008) was made with the Dhalingbuy community and tells the story of infamous Yolŋu warrior 'Slippery' Binydjarrpuma and his brother Nyepaynga. It is one of the first films made by the Mulka Project and features four generations of the Wangurri clan. Other short films include several works made with Indigenous children and the Sharing Stories Foundation. These include a ghost-story on Elcho Island, The Mokuy Story (2011), and a story of the Ngatji rainbow serpent told by Paakandji man Uncle Murray Butcher, The Ngatji and the Paddle-steamer (2011).

==== Themes, style and legacy ====
Murray's films are the result of long-term collaborations with Indigenous (Yolŋu) communities and artists in Arnhem Land and across Australia. Thematically, his films explore the Australian frontier wars, the history of colonialism, Australian Aboriginal culture and traditional knowledge systems, environmental history, and cultural storytelling.

The public legacy of Murray's film Dhakiyarr vs the King (2004) helped maintain awareness of the 1934 disappearance of Dhakiyarr Wirrpanda and assisted with ongoing advocacy. In March 2025, after a cold case investigation by the Northern Territory Police, the Northern Territory Coroner handed down a finding that Dhakiyarr died on or about 10 November 1934. The Coroner found the exact cause of death could not be determined due to the passage of time. Unsatisfied with the ruling, descendants Dhukal Wirrpanda and Djambawa Marawili called on the Northern Territory Government to officially recognise the death as an Aboriginal death in custody, locate Dhakiyarr's remains, and establish a reconciliation centre in Dhakiyarr's name. In December 2025, Northern Territory police announced a new investigation into the mysterious disappearance of Dhakiyarr Wirrpanda.

Since filming Dhakiyarr vs the King (2004), Murray maintained his relationship with the Wirrpanda family and supported their ongoing campaign through public commentary and academic advocacy.

=== Radio and broadcast work ===
Murray has written and produced a number of audio documentaries.

Along the Pituri Trail (1998) was a 52 minute audio documentary for ABC Radio National's social history program, Hindsight, which was broadcast again in 2008. It documented the trade in the Indigenous narcotic pituri and followed the path of the early explorer William Oswald Hodgkinson as he sought to discover the whereabouts of the secretly cultured pituri plant. Murray also recounted this story in the literary magazine Heat International.

Trepang Trade (2000) was a 53 minute audio documentary for ABC Radio National's social history program, Hindsight. It documented the historic trade between the Yolŋu people of north-east Arnhem Land and the people of Makassar in south Sulawesi.

Footsteps Home (2001) was a 52 minute audio documentary for ABC Radio National's social history program, Hindsight. It documented the background and impact of the 1970s Homelands Movement in north-east Arnhem Land, a social movement for Yolŋu people to return to their ancestral homelands. Murray also wrote about this movement in a 2003 essay for Meanjin titled Down By Law.

Preceding the film Dhakiyarr vs the King (2004) was the 53 minute audio a documentary Tuckier (Dhakiyarr) v the King and Territory (2002), which was first broadcast on ABC Radio National's social history program, Hindsight, in 2002 and again in 2013. It explores the 1934 disappearance of Yolŋu leader Dhakiyarr Wirrpanda.

Preceding the film The Skin of Others was the 47 minute audio documentary Douglas Grant: The Skin of Others (2017), which was broadcast on ABC Radio Nation's human experience program, Earshot. It was shortlisted for the NSW Premier's History Prize and explored the life of frontier war survivor and World War I soldier Douglas Grant. In 2018, the audio documentary was re-broadcast on ABC Radio National's immersive time machine program, the History Listen .

The Monstrous Worm – A Medieval Folk History (2018) is a two-part audio documentary. The first part was a 28 minute broadcast on ABC Radio National's immersive time machine program, History Listen. Part two, the Monstrous Worm – A myth migrates to Australia (2018) was a 28 minute broadcast a week later. It traces Murray's father's childhood encounters with the legend of the Lambton Worm in 1940s England, and incorporates cross-cultural material from a number of Murray's earlier works in Indigenous Australia. This audio documentary was made possible by an Australian Research Council Grant, Macquarie University and the Institute of Advanced Study Fellowship scheme of Durham University in the UK.

=== Academia ===
Murray's academic research focuses on the knowledge producing capacity of creative arts, screen-media, anthropology, and colonial history. In 2017, he was an Institute of Advanced Study Fellow at Durham University in England. In 2019, he became an Australian Research Council Future Fellow.

In 2023, Murray founded the Creative Documentary Research Centre (CDRC) and Creative Documentary Research Lab (CDRL) at Macquarie University. As of September 2026 he is a professor of screen media and creative arts at the university.

=== Film Festivals ===
Murray was the founder of the Black Snapper International Film Festival. The festival, founded in 2023 in partnership with the CDRC, was "the first major international student film festival held in Australia". The festival is named for the 'Wallumai' or black snapper totem of the Wallumettagal people, a Dharug group on whose traditional lands the university stands. Murray is also co-founder and curator of the Focus First Nations Film Festival run at the Walyalup Fremantle Arts Centre by the City of Fremantle in West Australia. Its first edition was in 2025 and the second edition in 2026. In 2026 it also featured the Walyalup Oration, an initiative founded by Murray. The inaugural speaker in the series was Thomas Mayo and the oration was broadcast on ABC Radio National Big Ideas.

== Other activities ==
Murray wrote Fishing Secrets, a novel that was shortlisted for The Australian/Vogel Literary Award in 2005. Murray has co-curated a number of exhibitions at Macquarie University Art Gallery and Cowra Regional Art Gallery. These include the group exhibition Vibrations in Australian Drawing (2023), and exhibitions on the work of Joanna Braithwaite: Thinking with Animals (2024) and Eric Smith: The Metaphysics of Paint (2025). This last exhibition brought the largely forgotten painter, Eric Smith, back to public recognition, as Murray wrote in an essay on the subject for The Conversation.

== Recognition and awards ==
Luke Buckmaster from The Guardian described The Skin of Others as a "living, breathing investigation" with a "thrilling energy" and "part essay, part detective story, part historical and cultural treatise".

John Noonan from FilmInk described The Skin of Others as a "visual essay" that uses "a mixed medium of animation, reconstructions and radio broadcasts from the time" to tackle Douglas Grant's life and remind the audience of white Australia's atrocities.

The Skin of Others won the 2020 Screen Music Award for Best Original Song Composed for the Screen at the Screen Music Awards (2020). The song Ballad of the Bridge Builders was written by Murray and David Bridie and performed by Archie Roach in the film. The Skin of Others also won the 2021 ATOM Award for Best Docu-Drama, and was a finalist for Best Documentary – Biography and finalist for Best Documentary – Social and Political Issues. Murray was also shortlisted for Best Writing in a Documentary Feature at the 54th AWGIE Awards in 2021.

In 2019, the audio documentary Monstrous Worm won bronze at the New York Festival Radio Awards,.

In 2014, Murray was awarded the Max Crawford Medal by the Australian Academy of the Humanities, which is the highest accolade for early-career scholars in Australia.

Reviewing In My Father's Country (2008), Amber Wilkinson from Eye for Film highlights "Murray has worked on several documentaries with the same community – and it shows". With adults and children oblivious to the camera, she notes Murray captures "some of their most intimate moments in a way that never feels forced or invasive". Wilkinson described the film as "sensitively and poetically shot" and "a journey, not just into this most sacred of ceremonies but also into the heart of a community", offering a fascinating window into a vibrant and ancient culture that is under threat.

In My Father's Country (2008) won the Australian Directors Guild Award for Best Director of a Feature Documentary.

Dhakiyarr vs the King (2004) won the Rouben Mamoulian Award at the Sydney Film Festival and the NSW Premier's History Award. It was also Highly Commended at the 2004 Human Rights Awards (Australia) and also received a Special Mention for An Outstanding Contribution to Australian Culture as judged by the Centre for Australian Cultural Studies.
