= Dhakiyarr Wirrpanda =

Australian Aboriginal leader (c. 1900–c.1934)

Dhakiyarr Wirrpanda or Tuckiar (c. 1900 – c. 1934) was a Yolngu man and a leader of the Dhudi-Djapu clan from the Blue Mud Bay region in the Northern Territory of Australia. In 1934 he was charged with the murder of Albert McColl, a police constable, at Woodah Island (Guwanŋarripa) and was sentenced to death by the Supreme Court of the Northern Territory. His sentence was later quashed by the High Court of Australia in the case known as Tuckiar v The King, which found this to be a serious miscarriage of justice. Wirrpanda then disappeared within days of his release and foul play is suspected.

== Life ==
Dhakiyarr Wirrpanda, also known as Tuckiar, was born near Blue Mud Bay, 60 mi (97 km) south of Caledon Bay, in north-east Arnhem Land around the early 1900s. He spoke the Dhuwal language and received a traditional education from his people and went on to have three wives with only one, Djaparri (Japari/Yapparti) being identified in written records.

== Conviction and aftermath ==
=== Background ===
In September 1932 five Japanese trepanging crew were killed at Caledon Bay, an event known as the Caledon Bay crisis. After the deaths, a party of police led my mounted constable Ted Morey were commissioned to investigate the circumstances. As part of this investigation the police party ended up at Woodah Island (Guwanŋarripa), some 100 km to the south of Caledon Bay. The reason why the police went to Guwaŋarripa to investigate events at Caledon Bay is unclear. However, as Mulkun Wirrpanda recounted in the film Dhakiyarr vs the King the police officer Albert McColl chained himself to Mulkun's mother, Djaparri, a wife of Dhakiyarr Wirrpanda. McColl also shot at Wirrpanda and the pistol misfired.

Mulkun described how Dhakiyarr returned from a hunting trip to find his wife chained to McColl and, as a result Dhakiyarr motioned to his wife to move away from the policeman in order to give him some room to throw his spear. Dhakiyarr then threw his spear and killed McColl, releasing his wife Djaparri.

=== Impact ===
The killing of a white policeman caused a national sensation. The NT administrator, Robert Weddell, said the federal government needed to counter with a “strong demonstrative force”, making “casualties amongst these Aboriginals inevitable”. In front-page news in the Melbourne Herald, he argued that a punitive expedition was required to “teach the natives a lesson”. As this was only four years since the Coniston Massacre, also in the Northern Territory, where national demonstrations were mobilised to protest against the possibility of military operations designed to massacre Indigenous Australians. The outcome was a missionary 'peace expedition' led by the Rev HE Warren and Rev Alf Dyer who were with the Church Mission Society, tasked to convince the perpetrators of the killing of the Japanese trepangers and policeman to face trial in Darwin.

Wirrpanda was ultimately convinced by Dyer and others to surrender himself and submit to trial in Darwin, in April 1934 in Darwin at the Supreme Court of the Northern Territory. To get there they set sail on 10 April, on the Oituli, and were surprised, on their arrival, to be placed in Fannie Bay Gaol.

=== Supreme Court trial ===
During the trial there were a series of procedural irregularities and few witnesses were called, none of which were for the defence, and the accused themselves were not allowed to testify; additionally the police tracker acted as an interpreter. As a result of this trial, on 5 August 1934, the judge TA Wells found Wirrpanda guilty of murder and sentenced him to death by hanging. This sentence was not translated for Wirrpanda and was despite a plea for mercy by Cecil Cook, the then protector of Aborigines, and an outburst by Dyer that the judge and the jury had not heard the true story.

=== High Court appeal ===
This caused a national outcry and was then appealed at the High Court of Australia in the case Tuckiar v The King, heard between 29 October and 8 November 1934. Wirrpanda's conviction was quashed and his immediate release from jail was ordered. The court found that the original trial had been a serious miscarriage of justice.

=== Release and death ===
Wirrpanda was then released from jail and taken to the Kahlin Compound on 12 November 1934. Wirrpanda, who had made plans to attend the cinema with Dyer, then disappeared from the compound and was never seen again. Many explanations have been made for the disappearance, including that he was murdered by friends of McColl, but this has never been established. There is no record of him after this date and it has remained one of Australia's oldest missing person cases.

Wirrpanda's grandson, Dhukal Wirrpanda, said in 2025:

That's a long time ago – 1934. We've been waiting since then and we still don't know what happened to him. If somebody knows then they are keeping it secret, but we lost our leader and we lost all of his knowledge and power.

== Coronial findings ==
In 2024 a coronial inquest was held in relation to the disappearance of Wirrpanda, with its findings published in March 2025. These found that there was not enough evidence to hold an inquest as it was unlikely to locate additional information and emphasis was placed on the lack of information that were available on the “exact circumstances of death” or “remains.

== In film and audio ==
=== Warriors and Lawmen (1984) ===
In 1984 documentary filmmaker and artist George Gittoes released Warriors and Lawmen about Wirrpanda. In December 2025 Gittoes stated that, 40 years earlier during the course of making the documentary, a family friend who was a former NT police officer, Joe Doyle, had told him that he had personally witnessed his colleagues taking Wirrpanda into Darwin Harbour to shoot him after his acquittal.

Doyle had told Gittoes his eyewitness account privately, swearing him to secrecy out of loyalty to his colleagues, who could have been charged with the murder. However, all of the officers are now dead, and Gittoes said that he was prepared to swear by his evidence.

In 2025 the office of the coroner of the Northern Territory interviewed Mr Gittoes about Joe Doyle's private testimony. Following the testimony of Mr Gittoes, the Office of the Coroner found that at the time of Dhakiyarr's death in 1934, Mr Doyle was 'approximately 15 years 9 months old on the date of Dhakiyarr's disappearance. This would have precluded him through age from being a serving police officer at the time of the disappearance'. Further, it was found that: 'Mr Doyle's service records with NT Police confirm that he was accepted into the NT Police from Paddington, Queensland, on 21 November 1941. He arrived in Darwin on 13 December 1941 and was sworn in as an NT Police Officer at the age of 22 years.' Hence Joe Doyle was not a serving police officer and was not an eyewitness to the disappearance of Dhakiyarr Wirrpanda seven years earlier.

=== Dhakiyarr vs the King and Territory (2002) ===
In 2002 documentary maker Tom Murray interviewed surviving members of the Dhudi-Djapu, Madarpa, Dhalwangu and Djapu clans to piece together an account of what happened to Dhakiyarr Wirrpanda and offer a Yolŋu perspective of events at the time. With further expert commentary from Ted Egan and other legal specialists, it was broadcast on ABC Radio National in 2002 and again in 2013.

=== Dhakiyarr vs the King (2004) ===
In 2004, the extended descendent families of Dhakiyarr Wirrpanda engaged in a documented process of investigation and reconciliation in the film Dhakiyarr vs the King, which was directed by Tom Murray and Allan Collins. As documented in the film, the families painted nine ceremonial larrakitj (hollow-log coffins) and placed them in the Supreme Court of the Northern Territory.

The nine larrakitj are painted with Dhakiyarr's ancestral stories and mark his presence in a court where he was once made 'invisible', or, as Dhukal Wirrpanda described it: 'they treated him like a man without a footprint'.

== Still seeking Justice ==
Following this new information the NT police have re-opened their investigation. A NT Police spokesperson confirmed that the force was pursuing new lines of inquiry uncovered by the ABC's investigation.

They stated:

The police Cold Case Taskforce are carrying out investigations into the disappearance of Dhakiyarr Wirrpanda in 1934 in light of recent reporting by the ABC," he said. "The Northern Territory Police consider long-term missing person cases open investigations and will act on any fresh information in the hope of achieving resolutions for the families. NT Police are engaging with [Dhakiyarr's] family.

— ABC News, 9 December 2025

As part of his desire to seek justice, Wirrpanda's grandsons, Dhukal Wirrpanda and Djambawa Marawili , have asked for the establishment of The Dhakiyarr Centre for Makarrata and Reconciliation. This educational centre would employ experts in Yolngu law to teach the principles of Yolngu justice and be located in the homelands adjacent to Dhakiyarr's homelands. It has received the support of senior Yolngu leaders Djambawa Marawili and Yingiya Guyula.
