= Galuma Maymuru =

Australian sculptor (born 1951)

- Born: 1951; Yirrkala, Northern Territory, Australia
- Died: 2018 (aged 66–67)
- Other name: Frances
- Known for: Painting, contemporary Indigenous Australian art
- Spouse: Dhukal Wirrpanda
- Father: Narritjin Maymuru
- Awards: Bark Painting Prize, Telstra National Aboriginal and Torres Strait Islander Art Awards, 2003

Galuma Maymuru (born 1951) is an Australian painter, printmaker and sculptor from Yirrkala in Arnhem Land in the Northern Territory.

== Biography ==
Maymuru was born on 8 August 1951 in Yirrkala in north-east Arnhem Land, the daughter of renowned artist Narritjin Maymuru. She grew up on the Yirrkala Mission.

Maymuru lived throughout the homelands of her Manggalili people, spending time at the Dhuruputjpi, Djarrakpi and Yilpara. Manggalili is her language group. She is married to fellow artist and sometime collaborator Dhukal Wirrpanda and is the mother-in-law of acclaimed artist Djambawa Marawili.

She was a school teacher before her father encouraged her to begin her artistic practice and began to train her. When her father died in 1981, Maymuru initially stopped painting and focused on her school teaching. She returned to painting by 1983, prompted by a desire to emulate her father and to teach her own children how to paint the sacred clan designs she had learned under the guidance of Narritjin.

== Art and career ==
Maymuru has been a working artist at the Buku-Larrnggay Mulka Art Centre at Yirrkala for over three decades. Her work is largely inspired by the landscape around Blue Mud Bay, as well as the Manggalili knowledge and ancestral designs her father taught her. She primarily works in bark painting and on ceremonial poles, beginning her career on "little barks" before shifting to large barks.

Her first solo exhibition was in 1999 at the William Mora Galleries in Melbourne. The show is subtitled "in memory of Narritjin" as an ode to all the knowledge her father passed down to her through painting. She is one of the first generation of Yolngu women to become major artists.

In 2003, Maymuru was awarded the bark painting prize at the Telstra National Aboriginal & Torres Strait Islander Art Award for her painting Guwak. The same year her work was featured in the exhibition titled Buwayak: Invisibility at the Annandale Galleries, which focused on the paintings of Maymuru, Djambawa Marawili, and Wanyubi Marika.

In 2013, her work was included in Found, an exhibition focused on works created by Yolngu artists out of material they find on the land and largely inspired by the innovative work of Gunybi Ganambarr. The piece she contributed, Yambirrku was painted on MDF rather than her traditional medium of eucalyptus bark.

Her work is held in major collections around Australia including the Art Gallery of New South Wales, the Sydney Opera House, the National Museum of Australia, the Museum and Art Gallery of the Northern Territory, the Harland Collection, the Ballarat Fine Art Gallery and the Berndt Museum of Anthropology at the University of Western Australia.
