= Wakuthi Marawili =

Indigenous Australian Artist

Wakuthi "Wakutbi" Marawili (1921 - March 2005) was an Indigenous Australian painter and leader of the Madarrpa clan. His son, Djambawa Marawili, continued his legacy and is also an artist.

Wakuthi belonged to the Yirritja moiety, and hailed from Dhurruputjpi, in Northeast Arnhemland's Blue Mud Bay. After a period at the Rose River settlement of Numbulwar (founded in 1952 by the Church Missionary Society), he led the Madarrpa people back to their ancestral lands at Baniyala in the 1970s. There he became a painter, and his works regularly sold through the Yirrkala Arts Center. His abstract paintings are only fully understood by those familiar with the related stories and songs.

== Art ==
One of his bark paintings, Fire Story (1969) tells the story of two men, Garramatji and Burrak, who were on the beach at Yathika. They set out for the bush to collect materials for making rope and harpoons - specifically, red-flowering kurrajong string (baḻwurr) and harpoons (gundarrpa). Under the shade of a special Maḏirrimy tree, they crafted their tools. Spotting a dugong, they hopped in their canoe (miyaṉgi) to chase after it. They speared the dugong, but it managed to swim through a fire left in the sea by Bäru, the ancestral crocodile, near a sacred rock. The fire prevented them from catching and eating the dugong. This fire and the nearby rock at Yathikpa are a permanent reminder of this story. This story and the associated painting belong exclusively to the Maḏarrpa clan.

Fire Story is a traditional Aboriginal bark painting. Traditional shades of yellow, brown, white and red are used. One of the most notable features is the series of "Yirritja diamonds" that permeate through the entire piece, reminding the viewer of Wakuthi's moiety.

=== Impact on his son's work ===
Marawili had an influence on the work of his son, Djambawa, as tradition and culture are passed down through family. The Kluge-Ruhe collection features photos from 1996 depicting Djambawa Marawili working on his painting, "Maḏarrpa Miny’tji | Maḏarrpa Clan Designs" (1996), alongside his father. The painting won the Bark Painting Award at the Telstra National Aboriginal and Torres Strait Islander Art Awards that same year. Wakuthi was aging, and Djambawa was stepping up to assume the leadership of the Maḏarrpa clan.”

Djambawa gave credit to his forefathers in remarks about the award:

They gave me that award, to thank me for these beautiful designs. It gave them pleasure to see this work that came from Yolŋu artists, but for me its significance is that these designs were put into our Country by the ancestors and then passed on down to us by our grandfathers and great-grandfathers, so that now we paint them.”

== Collections ==
Wakuthi Marawili's work is held in the permanent collection of the British Museum, National Gallery of Victoria, the Art Gallery of Western Australia, and the Art Gallery of South Australia.
