= Martin Leach =

Martin Leach may refer to:

- Martin Leach (executive) (1957–2016), president and COO of Ford Motor Company's European division
- Martin Leach (murderer) (born 1954), Australian convicted murderer and rapist
