= Martin Leach (murderer) =

Murderer and rapist (1959–2024)

- Born: 11 January 1959; Wellington, New Zealand
- Died: 3 August 2024 (aged 65); Darwin, Northern Territory, Australia
- Occupations: Mechanic; Cleaning company employee
- Spouse: Geraldine Leach (m. 1979)
- Children: 3
- Criminal charge: Rape; Murder x 2
- Penalty: 3 x life imprisonment without parole

Martin Leach (11 January 1959 – 3 August 2024) was a New Zealand-born convicted rapist and double murderer in Australia, and was described as one of, if not the Northern Territory's worst, killer.

Leach was the longest serving prisoner in the Northern Territory. He was imprisoned at the Darwin Correctional Centre, serving three consecutive life sentences without parole for his crimes.

== Early life ==
Leach was born in Wellington, New Zealand, one of nine children to parents Margaret and Geoffrey Edward Leach. He met his wife when aged sixteen and they married in 1979. In 1978, Leach had been involved in a serious motor vehicle accident near Mataranka, Northern Territory, which left him seriously injured.

== Rape ==
In 1979, Leach raped a woman at knifepoint after breaking into her house. He was sentenced to three years imprisonment.

In June 1982, Leach was released from prison and resumed his relationship with his wife and held a job for some time with a cleaning company. He was made redundant in December 1982 and, apart from employment for a period of one week in March 1983, he remained unemployed. His wife was in full-time employment.

== Double murder ==
On 20 June 1983, an eighteen-year-old local woman, Janice Carnegie, and her fifteen-year-old cousin, Charmaine Aviet, were swimming at a popular recreational waterhole at Berry Springs. Leach watched the pair for some time, before forcing them at knifepoint to accompany him to a nearby gully.

He stabbed Janice in the stomach when she attempted to reach for Leach's knife. Following the stabbing, he then raped her. He stabbed and killed Charmaine, then stabbed Janice in the neck; a pathologist testified it probably took her 5 to 10 minutes to die. Their naked bodies were later found bound and gagged in a shallow grave.

== Trials and appeals ==
On 10 May 1984, Leach was charged with two counts of murder and one count of rape by Northern Territory Police. Six days later he was convicted by a jury on all three counts, and Justice Muirhead sentenced him to imprisonment for life on each count, to run consecutively with each other and with a three-month sentence for assaulting a prison officer while on remand.

At the time he was sentenced for murdering the two girls, there was no power to fix a non-parole period for life sentences in the Northern Territory and the only possibility of release was executive clemency.

Legislation came into effect in 2004 providing for non-parole periods for life sentences for murder after that date; for an offender already serving life sentence(s), a section provided that the sentence be taken to include a 20-year non-parole period, or 25 years for those jailed for aggravated murder. On that basis, Leach would have been eligible for parole in 2009. The legislation also included that the Director of Public Prosecutions (Northern Territory) could apply to the Supreme Court to extend or exclude the non-parole period.

Less than a month after the law took effect, the Director of Public Prosecutions made an application to revoke Leach's non-parole period, and order that he spend the remainder of his life in jail. It was granted by Chief Justice Brian Martin, and upheld in a majority decision by the NT Court of Criminal Appeal, who ruled that his culpability was so extreme that the community's interest could only be served if he was imprisoned for the term of his natural life without the possibility of release on parole; the dissenting judge, Justice Stephen Southwood, said that he would have fixed a non-parole period of 40 years, making Leach eligible for parole in 2024 at the age of 65.

Leach appealed to the High Court, arguing that Chief Justice Martin had not shown he was satisfied beyond reasonable doubt that Leach's culpability was so extreme as to require a life sentence without parole. The High Court found Justice Martin had applied the correct tests: Chief Justice Murray Gleeson remarked that "He considered each of the specific aspects of community interest ... and ultimately came to the conclusion that he should refuse to fix a non-parole period". Judges also described Leach's crimes as "horrific" and said he had shown no remorse.

Leach died a prisoner, having officially exhausted all avenues of appeal.

== Death ==
Leach died of congestive cardiac failure on 3 August 2024 at the Royal Darwin Hospital, aged 65.
