= Gunybi Ganambarr =

Australian Aboriginal Artist

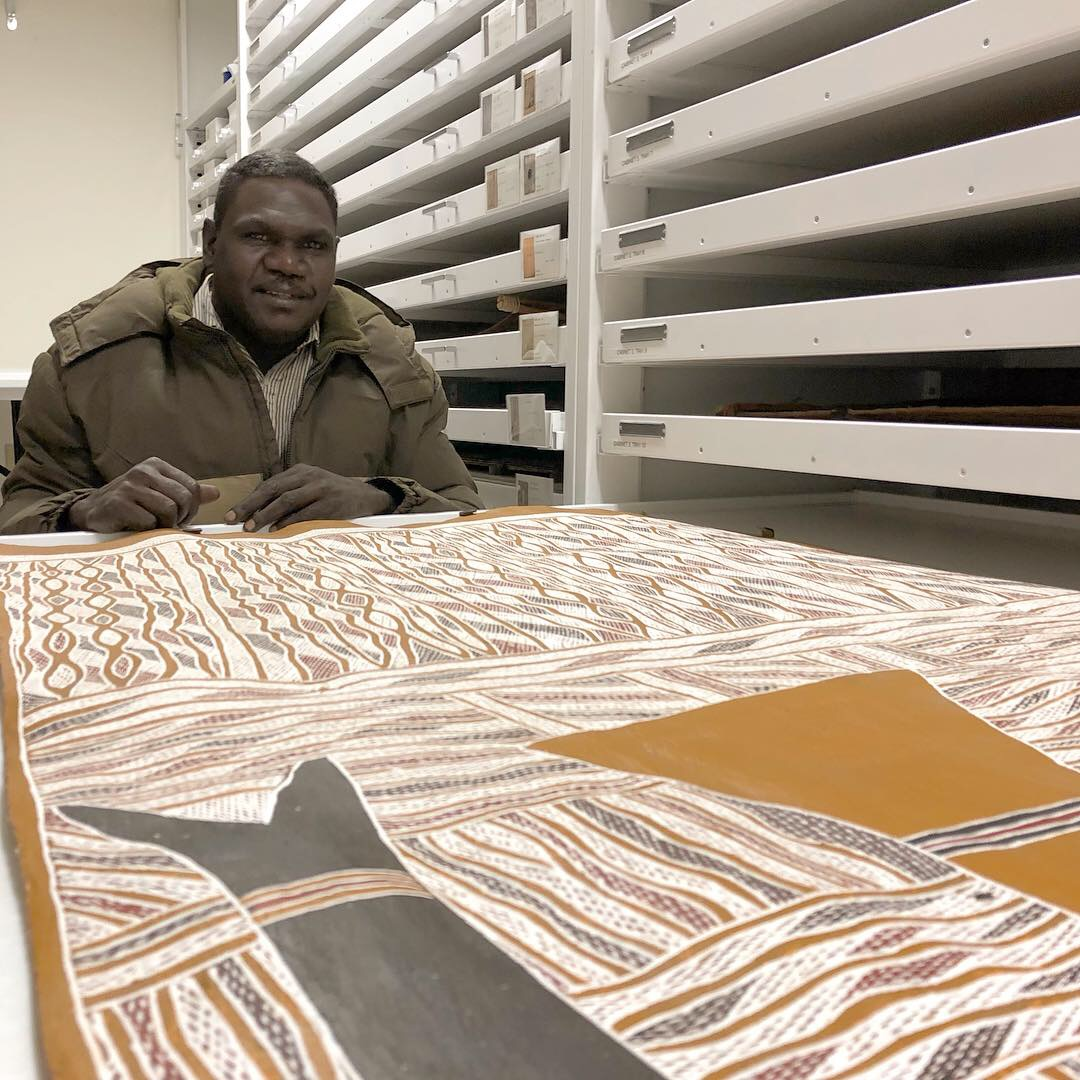
- Ganambarr in 2019
- Born: 15 April 1973 (age 53); Arnhem Land, Northern Territory, Australia
- Occupation: Aboriginal Artist
- Spouse: Lamangirra Marawili
- Website: Gunybi Ganambarr

Gunybi Ganambarr (1973) is an Aboriginal artist from Yirrkala, in the North-eastern Arnhem Land of the Northern Territory. He currently resides in Gängän where he continues to create his art. Ganambarr is considered the founder of the "Found" movement in northeast Arnhem Land, in which artists use recycled materials, onto which are etched sacred designs more commonly painted on eucalyptus bark.

== Early life ==
Gunybi Ganambarr was born on 15 April 1973.

Ganambarr's homeland being Yangunbi, an area on the Western shore of Melville Bay, close to where the Giddy River meets the Arafura Sea. He is part of the Ngaymil Clan of the Dhuwa Moiety. Dhuwa being one of the two moieties that make up the Yolngu world, where everything, including people, creatures, and vegetation, are either one or the other.

Ganambarr gained artistic knowledge from his family, as art techniques were passed down and inherited through generational family ties

Ganambarr's was influenced by his time at the art centre in Yirrkala, which he said had the attitude that anyone could become an artist. When asked what led Ganambarr to become an artist, he noted that he wanted to come up with a new technique and new talent.

== Career ==
When Ganambarr moved to Gängän, Arnhem Land he worked under the artists Gawirrin Gumana and Yumutjin Wunungmurra. This lead him to having ceremonial authority within the Dhaḻwaŋu clan. He took the customs seriously and kept those elements, adhering to Yolgnu Madayin law in his art despite his modern and experimental approach.

Ganambarr spent twelve years as a housebuilder in a Gangan outstation. Whilst there, he came to understand the machinery, grinder, and tools that the artists typically use to collect bark. This would influence his later use of discarded materials in his artwork.

Ganambarr began painting at the age of 30, using natural pigments on eucalyptus bark and larrakitj. However, in 2006, he began experimenting with reclaimed materials not traditionally used in Aboriginal art, such as glass, rubber, and various metals. In the Aboriginal art scene, most Yolngu artists had been held to the longstanding tradition that in order to paint Madayin miny'tji, or sacred clan designs, one must use materials that came from country or naturally occurred in the landscape—traditionally, these materials included natural ochres and eucalyptus bark. Ganambarr consulted with his clan elders, arguing that reclaimed or "found" materials such as aluminum metal scraps should also be considered part of the land and therefore eligible for use in artwork depicting sacred designs, opening up avenues for other artists to use new materials in their artwork as well. He argued, however, that it was important that these reclaimed materials should be found already discarded within the landscape. This was the founding of the "Found" art movement. Ganambarr and followers of the movement do not buy new materials, but rather use discarded or pre-used materials, such as discarded roofing insulation or sheet metal.

In 2009, Ganambarr had his first solo exhibition, titled Dhuwa Saltwater, at Annandale Galleries. The exhibition included works where bark was incised and the remaining shavings added on after, a method not seen before.

In 2012, Ganambarr had his second solo exhibition at the Annandale Galleries titled, From My Mind, in which he had works containing chicken wire, roofing insulation and PVC pipes.

In 2013, Ganambarr was in the exhibition Found alongside Djirrirra Wunungmurra and Ralwurrandji Wanambi. Inspired by Ganambarr's work, he exhibition was about "abandoning the traditional medium of bark" and "expanding...methods and materials".

Ganambarr said his art is inspired by mapping his family, habit, and place, which is the meaning behind his art. In 2018, Ganambarr was awarded first prize in the Telstra National Aboriginal and Torres Strait Islander Art Awards for his etched aluminum work Buyku. Speaking on the work, Ganambarr said:

Artworks of this nature have multiple layers of metaphor and meaning which give lessons about the connections between an individual and specific pieces of country (both land and sea), as well as the connections between various clans but also explaining the forces that act upon and within the environment and the mechanics of a spirit’s path through existence. The knowledge referred to by this imagery deepens in complexity and secrecy as a person progresses through a life-long learning process.

Ganambarr has claimed that becoming an artist has allowed him to care more about educating others. He wants everyone to hear his story as he shares about his home that has existed for thousands and thousands of years.

== Awards ==
Year	Outcome	Prize	Institution	Notes	Ref
2005	Entrant	National Sculpture Prize		On invitation by National Gallery of Australia's, Brenda Croft	
2008	Winner	Xstrata Coal Engineering Indigenous Artist Award	The Gallery of Modern Art at Queensland Art Gallery		
2011	Winner	West Australian Indigenous Art Award			
2011	Grant winner		Sidney Myer Fund	Shared with 12 other artists	
2018	First Prize	Telstra National Aboriginal and Torres Strait Islander Art Awards		For his work Buyku	

== Personal life ==
Ganambarr plays the ceremonial yidaki, also known as a Didgeridoo. In this role, he was sought after by elders to accompany their sacred song. He played the Digeridoo for two of his mother's clans in Dhaḻwaŋu and Maḏarrpa ceremonies, both clans being of the Yirritja moeity. Ganambarr spent over a decade as a construction worker and builder for the Laynhapuy Homelands Association, however returned to Gängän, his mother's homeland, later. His mother being a member of the Dhaḻwaŋu clan. The leaders of Ganambarr's mother's clans recognized his talents in ceremony and guided him to become a djunggaya, a caretaker of clan laws, but first encouraged him to share his knowledge through painting.

One of his influential mentors is Djambawa Marawili, whose daughter, Lamangirra Marawili, he is married to.

== Collections ==
- Art Gallery of New South Wales
- Hood Museum of Art, Dartmouth College
- Kluge-Ruhe Aboriginal Art Collection of the University of Virginia
- Metropolitan Museum of Art, New York
- Museum of Contemporary Art, Australia

== Exhibitions ==
=== Group ===
Year	Title	Venue	Location	Notes	Ref
2008	Young Guns II				
2009	Breaking Boundaries: Contemporary Indigenous Australian Art From The Collection				
2010	Yalmakany & Gurrundul Marawili				
2012	unDisclosed: 2nd National Indigenous Art Triennial				
2012	Stock Jewels, Artists of the Gallery				
2013	unDisclosed: 2nd National Indigenous Art Triennial				
	Found			With Djirrirra Wunungmurra and Ralwurrandji Wanambi	
2013 - 2014	unDisclosed: 2nd National Indigenous Art Triennial				
2014	Celebration 25 Years of the AGWA Foundation				
2017	Notions of Country			With Garawan Wanambi and Naminapu Maymuru-White	
2018	Artists of the Gallery				
2019	Buku-Larrŋgay Mulka: Mittji				
2019 - 2020	Tarnanthi		Adelaide		
2019 - 2020	Steel: Art Design Architecture				
2020	Special Selection, International, Australian & Aboriginal Paintings & Sculpture				
2022	An Alternative Economics				
2022 - 2023	Transitions				
2022 - Present	Maḏayin: Eight Decades of Aboriginal Australian Bark Painting from Yirrkala				
2024	First Nation Australia				

=== Solo ===
Year	Title	Venue	Location	Ref
2009	Dhua Saltwater			
2012	From My Mind			
2019	Mother and Child			
2020	Dhanun nalma - Here we are			
