= Caledon Bay crisis =

1932–34 killings in Australia's Northern Territory

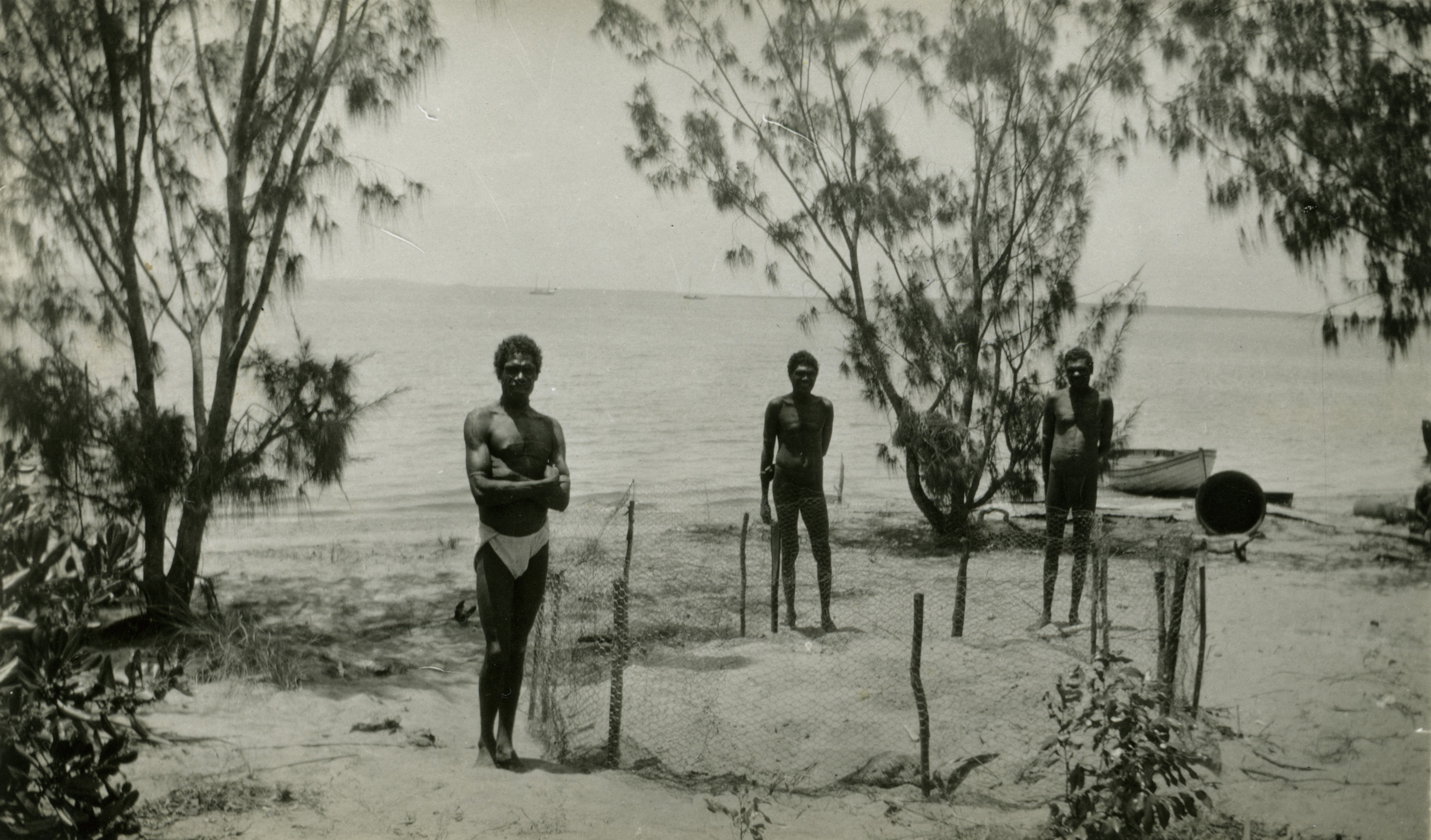
Graves of the Japanese trepangers killed in Caledon Bay, 1933

The Caledon Bay crisis refers to a series of killings at Caledon Bay in the Northern Territory of Australia during 1932–34, referred to in the press of the day as Caledon Bay murder(s). Five Japanese trepang fishers were killed by Aboriginal Australians of the Yolngu people. A police officer investigating the deaths, Albert McColl, was subsequently killed. Shortly afterwards, two white men went missing on Woodah Island (with one body found later). With some of the white community alarmed by these events, a punitive expedition was proposed by Northern Territory Police to "teach the blacks a lesson".

However, it was feared that a punitive expedition would lead to an event similar to the 1928 Coniston massacre (when a number of innocent Aboriginal people were killed by a white patrol group after a murder). A party from the Church Missionary Society travelled to Arnhem Land and persuaded Dhakiyarr Wirrpanda and three other men, sons of a Yolngu elder, Wonggu, to return to Darwin with them for trial.

In Darwin in April 1934, Dhakiyarr was sentenced to death by hanging for the murder of McColl. The three other men were sentenced to 20 years' hard labour. After a seven months’ investigation, the federal government freed the three men imprisoned for the killings. On appeal to the High Court of Australia, in a case known as Tuckiar v The King, Dhakiyarr's sentence was quashed in November 1934, and he was released from jail, but disappeared on his way home.

== Sequence of events ==
=== Killings ===
There had previously been killings of Japanese fishermen in 1921 and 1926. On 17 September 1932, five Japanese trepangers were killed by Aboriginal men in the Caledon Bay area of northeast Arnhem Land. In 1962, Mau, one of the men involved in the killings, said that this had been in retaliation for the Japanese men ducking Wonggu's head (Mau's father) in offal; Wonggu had approached the Japanese men to talk about their staring at Yolngu women, a taboo.

In a separate incident, two white drifters, William Fagan and Frank Traynor, were killed in 1933, most likely in March. In 1976, Djaparri, a Yolngu woman, said that the killings were in retaliation for the white men having taken and "fucked" her and at least four other Yolngu women.

In June 1933 a police party arrived in the area from Darwin, to look for suspects. On 1 August 1933, a group of police, led by Mounted Constable Ted Morey and including Constable Albert McColl, were on Woodah Island trying to track down the people they believed were involved in the killings of the Japanese and possibly the missing men. They came across a group of Aboriginal women, and McColl and the women became separated from the others. The women included Djaparri, a wife of Dhakiyarr, a Yolngu elder. McColl had handcuffed the women, as part of a plan to trap Dhakiyarr. When Dhakiyarr attempted to contact his wife, McColl shot at him and misfired; Dhakiyarr threw a spear at McColl, killing him.

=== Reaction ===
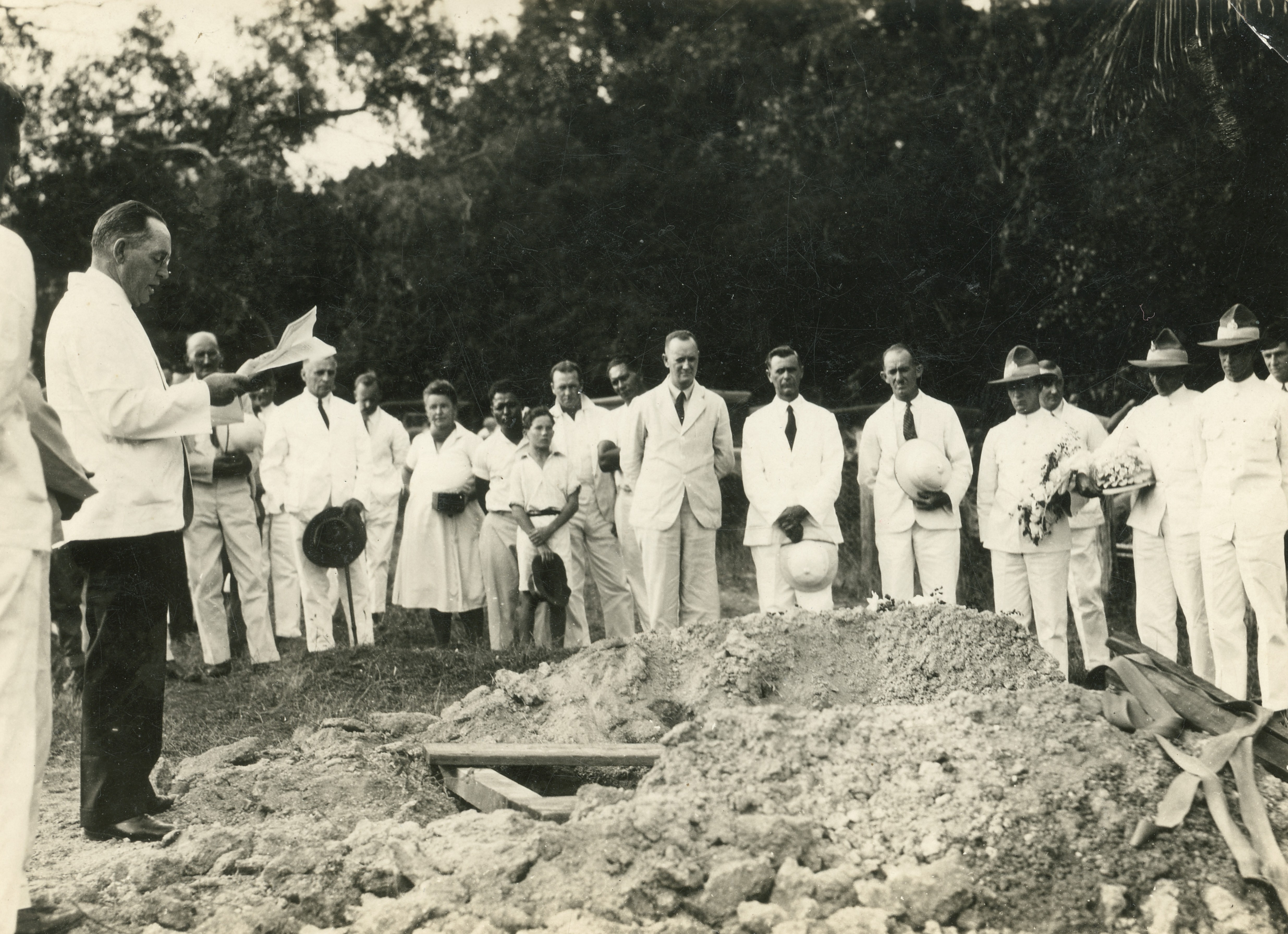
Funeral held for Mounted Constable Albert Stewart McColl

After the news of McColl's death reached Darwin on 11 August 1933, many in the community became alarmed. A punitive expedition by police was proposed on 29 August by Administrator R. H. Weddell to "teach the blacks a lesson". There were protests against this idea, peaking in early September with a unanimous resolution by the Council of Churches, and Interior Minister John Perkins quashed the idea. In 1928, during a previous punitive expedition in the Northern Territory, police had killed up to 200 Aboriginal men, women and children; an event known as the Coniston massacre, and many feared another such slaughter.

On 14 November 1933, one Fred Gray, a trepanger, reported that "Mereela" and "Barion" had killed Fagan and Traynor, and Dhakiyarr had killed McColl. On 22 November 1933 a peace mission was planned by the Church Missionary Society to speak with the alleged murderers and eyewitnesses. They travelled to Arnhem Land and persuaded Dhakiyarr and three other men, who were sons of a Yolngu elder, Wonggu, to return to Darwin with them for trial. On 15 March 1934, Dhakiyarr and 16 other Yolngu men travelled to Darwin, accompanied by missionaries.

=== Trials ===
Dhakiyarr was arrested and put in Fannie Bay Gaol, but there were many delays before the cases could be brought to trial, owing mostly to lack of prosecution witnesses. In April 1934, it was ruled that the confessions of Dhakiyarr and Meerera, who was said to have acted with Dhakiyarr in the killing of Traynor and Fagan, were inadmissible in a murder trial for these killings (the remains of one of the two, unidentified, had been found earlier). There was not enough evidence for these cases to be brought to trial.

In May 1934, a Northern Territory Ordinance was amended so that a death sentence would not be mandatory in Aboriginal murder convictions. Clergyman and anthropologist A. P. Elkin and others argued for the need for a separate system of native courts.

On 1 August 1934, the three men convicted of murdering the Japanese trepangers were sentenced to twenty years' hard labour, and on 3 August 1934 Dhakiyarr was sentenced to death by hanging in the Supreme Court of the Northern Territory by Judge Wells and a 12-person jury. The defence had not pursued the contention that the Japanese men had provoked the Yolngu men.

NT newspapers supported Judge Wells' sentence, but there were protests from many quarters, not only about the sentence, but about the fairness of the trial and the Judge's comments during the trial. Four days before Dhakiyarr's scheduled hanging, on 29 August 1934, Governor-General Isaac Isaacs ordered a stay of execution, pending an appeal, and the following day, the High Court granted the right to appeal.

=== Appeal: Tuckiar v The King ===
On 29–30 October 1934 the appeal was heard at the High Court of Australia in Melbourne, in a case known as Tuckiar v the King, Dhakiyarr's and the three other Yolngu men's sentences were quashed after numerous irregularities in the first trial were pointed out. Dhakiyarr was released from jail and taken to Kahlin compound, but was never seen again. Oral tradition has it that he was murdered by friends of McColl.

== Aftermath ==
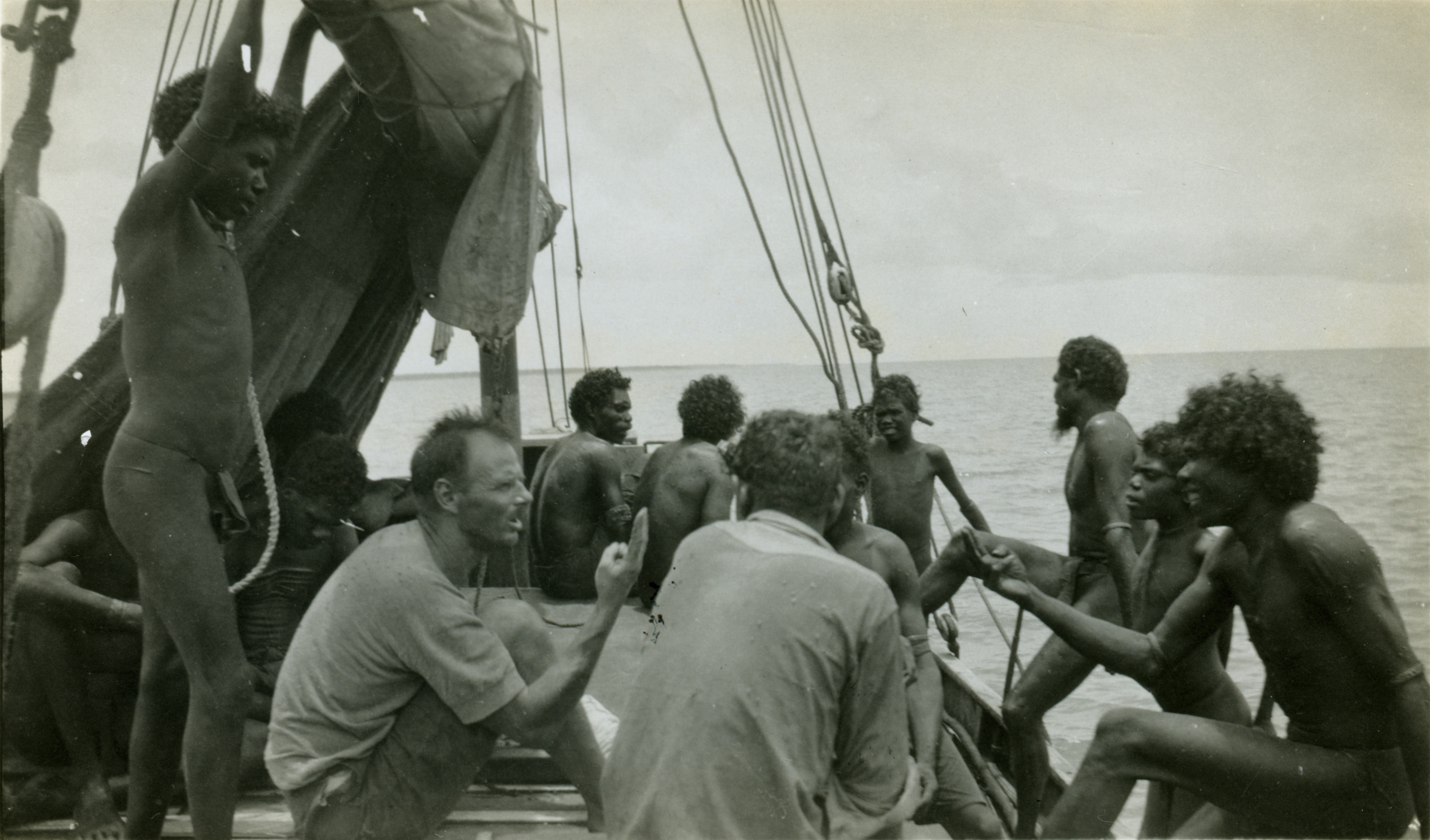
Peace Mission to Caledon Bay

The resulting crisis threatened to bring about even more bloodshed. To defuse the situation, a young anthropologist, Donald Thomson, offered to investigate the causes of the conflict. He travelled to Arnhem Land, on a mission that many said would be suicidal, and got to know and understand the people who lived there. After a seven months’ investigation, he persuaded the Federal Government to free the three men convicted of the killings and returned with them to their own country, living for over a year with their people, documenting their culture. In the course of his negotiations, he wrote of Wonggu sending a message stick to his sons, at that time in prison, to indicate a calling of a truce. In etched angles, it showed people sitting down together, with Wonggu at the centre, keeping the peace. The message stick is now housed in the Buku-Larrnggay Mulka Centre at Yirrkala.

He formed a strong bond with the Yolngu people, and in 1941 he persuaded the Army to establish a special reconnaissance force of Yolngu men known as the Northern Territory Special Reconnaissance Unit, including Wonggu and his sons, to help repel Japanese raids on the northern coastline of Australia.

The historian Henry Reynolds has suggested that the Caledon Bay crisis was a decisive moment in the history of Aboriginal-European relations.

== Sources ==
- Conor, Liz (2013). "'Black Velvet' and 'Purple Indignation': Print responses to Japanese 'poaching' of Aboriginal women". Aboriginal History. 37: 51–76. doi:10.22459/AH.37.2013.03. JSTOR 24046958.
