= The Skin of Others =

Australian documentary film

- Film poster for The Skin of Others featuring a 1918 photograph of Private Douglas Grant of the 13th Battalion, AIF, as a prisoner of war in Wünsdorf-Zossen, Germany
- Directed by: Tom Murray
- Written by: Tom Murray
- Produced by: Tom Murray
- Starring: Balang Tom E. Lewis as Douglas Grant; Archie Roach as himself; Max Cullen as Henry Lawson
- Cinematography: Allan Collins; Kathryn Milliss
- Edited by: Hilary Balmond
- Music by: David Bridie
- Animation by: Rose Draper
- Distributed by: Ronin Films
- Release dates: 10 June 2020 (Sydney Film Festival); 25 January 2022 (Australia)
- Running time: 91 minutes
- Country: Australia
- Language: English

The Skin of Others is an Australian documentary film about the life of Indigenous World War I soldier and human rights activist Douglas Grant (1885–1951). Written, produced, and directed by academic Tom Murray, the film features the final performance of Balang Tom E. Lewis (1958–2018), who portrays Grant in dramatic reconstructions.

== Synopsis ==
At the age of two, Douglas Grant survived the 1887 massacre of the Ngadjonji rainforest people by white miners and native police in the Queensland locality of Boonjie, which was commemoratively renamed and is still known today as Butchers Creek. Grant was subsequently adopted into a Scottish family as a child, served as a soldier in World War I, and became a human rights activist and cultural figure. The film links Grant's survival of the massacre at Boonjie with the story of Ngadjonji elder Narcha – also known as Barry Clarke – whose stolen remains were held in Berlin, the same place Grant was held as a prisoner of war.

In telling Grant's story the film examines colonial Australia's relations with First Nations peoples and explores methods of historical storytelling, particularly how those methods affect the way national history is understood. The film documents how Grant's life connected with key people of the 19th and 20th centuries, including Henry Lawson, Adolf Hitler, and Archduke Franz Ferdinand, as well as with events such as the frontier wars that remade Aboriginal nation-territories into the Commonwealth of Australia. As the film points out, there is still no national monument to the Australian frontier wars.

== Cast ==
Balang Tom E. Lewis plays Douglas Grant in the dramatic reconstructions. Balang died while making the film, and the cultural significance of referring to the actor as Balang is covered in the film.

Max Cullen plays writer and poet Henry Lawson in dramatic reconstructions.

Musician Uncle Archie Roach appears as himself, reflecting on the lives of Grant and Balang in relation to his own story. He performs the song Ballad of the Bridge Builders, written by Tom Murray and David Bridie.

== Development ==
The film was developed from research by Tom Murray, an academic at Macquarie University, and was funded by the Australian Research Council through a Discovery Early Career Researcher Award (DECRA). Preceding the film, Murray had made two audio documentaries on the film's subject matter: Douglas Grant: The Skin of Others (2017), broadcast on ABC Radio National's human experience program, Earshot; and Douglas Grant (2018), broadcast on ABC Radio National's immersive time machine program, History Listen.

Murray also tracked down the only known sculpture of an Indigenous Australian World War I soldier, which was a bronze bust by German Jewish sculptor Rudolf Marcuse. The Jewish Museum in Berlin had digitised photographs of Macuse's 1919 Ethnic Types from the World War collection of sculptures. In this collection was a photograph of a bust described as "Australian Aborigine". The significance and whereabouts of the bust remained unknown, until history scholar Hilary Howes and Murray tracked its sale between arts and antiques dealers and found the man who bought the "negro" bust from a British dealer. Through further research, Howes and Murray determined the bust was of Grant and made when Marcuse was sent to the Wünsdorf prisoner-of-war camp to sculpt portraits of the prisoners. As explained in the film, because Wünsdorf held soldiers from colonised territories, the camp served as a site for racial science experiments and the production of racialised art. While more than 1000 Indigenous Australian men served in World War I and even though Grant was not the only Anoriginal man to be imprisoned, Grant was considered "the prize capture". Pseudoscientific researchers reportedly measured grant "all over, and upside down and inside out". With this context in mind, Murray and historian Hilary Howes analysed Marcuse and Grant's meeting, exploring the capacity of a personal encounter to resist political ideologies and colonial agendas.

== Distribution ==
The film premiered at the 2020 Sydney Film Festival, screened on SBS World Movies, and was made available to stream on SBS On Demand.

The film was also featured on NITV Radio, which described Douglas Grant as a "cultural bridge-builder when it was extremely dangerous to be an Aboriginal man seeking reconciliation across the Australian racial divide".

== Awards ==
- Winner, 2020 Screen Music Award for Best Original Song Composed for the Screen for Ballad of the Bridge Builders, written by Tom Murray and David Bridie and performed by Uncle Archie Roach
- Winner, 2021 ATOM Award for Best Docudrama
- Nominated, 2020 Ellie Award for Best Editing in a Documentary Feature (Hilary Balmond)
- Nominated, 2021 ATOM Award for Best Documentary: Biography
- Nominated, 2021 ATOM Award for Best Documentary: Social and Political Issues
- Nominated, 2021 AWGIE Award for Best Writing in a Documentary Feature (Tom Murray)

== Critical reception ==
Luke Buckmaster of The Guardian described the film as a "living, breathing investigation" into the life of Grant. Buckmaster stated that the film challenges history, has a "thrilling energy", and is "part essay, part detective story, and part historical and cultural treatise". He also described the film as a tribute to Balang Tom E. Lewis, noting that it leaves the viewer with a “powerful impression of Lewis as an artist and intellect” and a person "fascinated by stories and compelled towards the process of artistic creation".

John Noonan of FilmInk described the film as a "visual essay" that uses "a mixed medium of animation, reconstructions and radio broadcasts from the time" to tackle Grant's life and remind the audience of white Australia's atrocities.

Sarah Ward of Flicks describes the film as "important viewing" that "is a work of interrogation and unearthing" that "shares a crucial historical tale that demands attention" when the story is one the "country might’ve otherwise happily forgotten".

In a preview of the 2020 Sydney Film Festival, Gary Maddox of The Sydney Morning Herald described The Skin of Others as a docudrama about Douglas Grant and noted that Tom Murray had reshaped the film following the death of Balang Tom E. Lewis. Maddox highlighted the way the film interweaves the lives of Grant and Lewis, who "both wanted to bridge the country's racial divide".

Paul Daley of The Guardian provided fascinating developmental context for the film. He described Director and academic Tom Murray's research as "rich" and "compelling", explained that Murray "has spent many years in Australia and overseas piecing together Grant’s 66 or so years" and claimed the Murray "probably knows more about [Douglas] Grant than any other living person". Through Douglas Grant's complex life story, Daley said audiences can learn that "Australia’s history is nuanced, that it is not either/or, that it must incorporate all narratives, black and white and other, good and bad, and that when all the cultural warring is over and done we ought all accept the sum of it".

Paul Daley of the The Guardian highlighted Present Traces, a Macquarie University research film series produced by Kathryn Millard and The Skin of Others director Tom Murray. As part of this initiative, an early short-film iteration of the film explored the life of Douglas Grant, drawing on over a decade of archival research by Murray to reframe Australian history.

Glenn Dunks of ScreenHub wrote that the film "tackles potent themes but with a spirit that should make it a popular choice for viewers at home."

Sarah Ward of Concrete Playground praised the film as a "comprehensive and informative documentary" that "recounts the crucial details" of Grant's life "aided by lively recreations of Grant's life starring late Australian actor Balang (Tom E.) Lewis".

Anne Dowd of the Northern Territory arts magazine Off The Leash highlighted Balang Tom E. Lewis's final performance portraying World War I Aboriginal soldier Douglas Grant. She noted that "Lewis joining the project was pivotal" and he was "a guide into understanding these histories, weaving parts of his own life into the film". Dowd highlighted ther "Murray aims to expose audiences to new ways of thinking about Australia's past and future".
