= Tuckiar v The King =

1934 Australian High Court case

- Court: High Court of Australia
- Decided: 8 November 1934
- Citations: [1934] HCA 49, (1934) 52 CLR 335

Court membership
- Judges sitting: Frank Gavan Duffy, CJ, Hayden Starke, JJ; Owen Dixon, JJ; H. V. Evatt, JJ; Edward McTiernan, JJ

Tuckiar v The King is a landmark 1934 judgment of the High Court of Australia. The matter examined the behaviour of the judge and lawyers in the trial of Yolngu man Dhakiyarr Wirrpanda in the Northern Territory Supreme Court a year earlier for one of the Caledon Bay murders, and overturned the judgment which had found the appellant guilty and sentenced him to death.

The case was decided on 8 November 1934, after a two-day hearing on 29–30 October 1934. At the time, the original case had stirred much controversy and caused a debate about the appropriateness of the Australian justice system for Indigenous Australians. It has become a case study in, and raises many issues for, legal ethics regarding instructions by judges and the behaviour of defence counsel, as well as the treatment of Indigenous people before the Australian justice system.

== Background ==
Dhakiyarr Wirrpanda, a Yolngu Aboriginal man living a traditional life, was sentenced to death in the Northern Territory Supreme Court for the murder by spearing of a police constable, Albert McColl, on Woodah Island, an island off Arnhem Land on the northern coast of Australia. McColl had gone to Arnhem Land with a police party to apprehend some Aboriginal people thought to have killed the crew of a Japanese pearling lugger. It emerged that McColl chained up Djappari, wife of Dhakiyarr, and three other women. A witness said McColl sexually assaulted Djappari. McColl attempted to shoot Dhakkiyar three times but missed. Dhakkiyar then speared McColl to release his wife and the other women.

The trial lasted only one day, with a guilty verdict returned by the 12-person jury after what was later deemed to be misdirection by Judge Wells. Defence arguments of self-defence or provocation were not put to the jury. The episode surrounding these killings and that of another two men were referred to in the press as the Caledon Bay murders.

== Appeal ==
The case which became known as Tuckiar v. the King was the appeal in the High Court of Australia from the Supreme Court of the Northern Territory. The case was heard over two days, 29–30 October 1934, in Melbourne after some protest and lobbying by people including the Anglican clergyman A. P. Elkin.

The High Court unanimously found that there had been a miscarriage of justice, and that the trial judgment should be set aside.

On the way home from his seven-month incarceration in Fannie Bay Gaol, Dhakiyarr went missing, never to be seen again.

== Legal uses ==
The quote "Our system of administering justice necessarily imposes upon those who practise advocacy duties which have no analogies, and the system cannot dispense with their strict observance." from the case was used in the AB v CD; EF v CD court case concerning the use of the criminal barrister Nicola Gobbo as a secret informant by the Victorian Police.

The documentary film Dhakiyarr vs the King, co-directed by Tom Murray and Allan Collins, has been used as an educational resource in universities and by the New South Wales Bar Association. The film is distributed for academic and public study via platforms like Kanopy and the National Film and Sound Archive.

== Legacy ==
In an act of reconciliation, 38 descendants of McColl and around 200 descendants of Dhakiyarr attended a 2003 ceremony in the Supreme Court of the Northern Territory in Darwin. This was chronicled in the 2004 film Dhakiyarr vs the King, by Tom Murray and Allan Collins, Since 2004 Murray has maintained his relationship with the Wirrpanda family and supported their ongoing campaign to investigate Dhakkiyar's death through public commentary and academic advocacy.

In March 2025, after a cold case investigation by the Northern Territory Police, the Northern Territory Coroner handed down a finding that Dhakiyarr died on or about 10 November 1934. The Coroner found the exact cause of death could not be determined due to the passage of time.

Unsatisfied with the ruling, descendants Dhukal Wirrpanga and Djambawa Marawili called on the Northern Territory Government to officially recognise the death as an Aboriginal death in custody, locate Dhakiyarr's remains and establish a reconciliation centre in Dhakiyarr's name.

In December 2025, Northern Territory police announced a new investigation into the mysterious disappearance of Dhakiyarr Wirrpanda.
