= Thomas Wells (Australian judge) =

Australian judge

Thomas Alexander Wells (c. 1888 – 13 September 1954) was a judge of the Northern Territory Supreme Court in Darwin, Australia. He was known for having misdirected the jury in a high-profile case in 1934, which was later overturned in an appeal in the High Court of Australia known as Tuckiar v The King.

== Career ==
Wells was a court reporter for a Sydney newspaper.

He served overseas in WWI and on returning to Australia studied law in Sydney, where he practised at the bar for nine years after graduating.

In 1933 he was appointed Judge of the Supreme Court of the Northern Territory, following the retirement of Justice Mallam (1878–1954).

He presided over some of the Territory's most high-profile trials, including the murder trial of Dhakiyarr Wirrpanda, a Yolngu man from Caledon Bay in Arnhem Land, who was convicted of murdering Constable Albert Stewart McColl at Woodah Island on 1 August 1933. This was part of a series of events known as the Caledon Bay crisis Dhakiyarr was convicted of murder and sentenced to death, but seven months later this verdict was overturned in the Tuckiar v The King case. Several reasons were given for the success of the appeal, including that Judge Wells had misdirected the jury.

He was regarded more benignly for ordering the doors of Fannie Bay Gaol open following the Japanese air raids in 1942, rather than have them suffer should the jail receive a direct hit.

He was himself evacuated to Alice Springs following the air raids, returning in 1945.

== Later life and legacy ==
He suffered a stroke in 1951, and retired the following year. He died in Darwin Hospital in September 1954.

Wells Street, in the Darwin suburbs of Ludmilla and Parap, is named after him.
