= Baniyala =

Small settlement in Australia

Coordinates: 13°12′S 136°14′E

Bäniyala is a tiny community of Aboriginal Australian people, known as a homeland, situated on Blue Mud Bay in the Gulf of Carpentaria in East Arnhem Land in the Northern Territory of Australia, located 210 kilometres (130 mi) from Nhulunbuy. It is home to about 150 Yolŋu people.

== History ==
Bäniyala was re-established by traditional owners of the land in the 1970s. The Bäniyala Garrangali Aboriginal Corporation (BGAC) was established for the purpose of selling food in 1975, later expanding its purpose to expanding opportunities for economic and social development in the region. Investment is needed in order to help support local enterprises and create more jobs, in order to help the local people living on country.

The people of Bäniyala community were key players in the Blue Mud Bay case, decided by the High Court of Australia in July 2008, establishing a precedent for sea rights in Australia over an intertidal zone for the first time.

== Facilities ==
The Bäniyala Garrangali Aboriginal Corporation operates a campground and cabin accommodation at Bäniyala. A permit is needed to visit or transit the homeland.

== Industry ==
In 2019, the people of Baniyala engaged the CSIRO to investigate industries which could help boost the local economy, including the potential for aquaculture (in particular sea cucumbers), mining, forestry, eco-tourism, and chartered fishing expeditions.

In July 2019, Northern Land Council entered into an agreement with the NT Government for rights over access to the waters for commercial and recreational fishing, before consulting the appropriate traditional owners. After community leader Djambawa Marawili raised the matter, a meeting was held with the NLC, and on the 11th anniversary of the High Court's Blue Mud Bay decision, traditional owners signed an agreement to allow fishing access to these waters for the following 18 months.

In July 2020, the Northern Land Council and the NT Government signed the "Blue Mud Bay Action Plan", by which both are committed to securing fishing rights for the region's Indigenous people. This plan is part of the Nitmiluk Agreement (signed in 2019), which aims at building economic opportunities for Aboriginal people in the fishing industry, including establishing an Aboriginal-owned fishing enterprise.

The COVID-19 pandemic had significant impact on this remote community, including loss of tourism income and shortages of goods and groceries, leading to health risks. A five-year strategic plan was established in 2020 to help BGAC to overcome these challenges.

== Notable people ==
- Djambawa Marawili AM, artist, community leader, and member of the Prime Minister's Indigenous Advisory Council
- Garrangali Band

== In film ==
Baniyala is a documentary film released in 1996, made by Ian Dunlop as part of his Yirrkala Film Project, showing "the 1974 lifestyle of the Madarrpa people of Baniyala on Blue Mud Bay".
