= Stephen Southwood =

Australian judge

Stephen Roger Southwood KC (born 7 September 1955) is a judge of the Supreme Court of the Northern Territory. He was appointed to the court on 31 January 2005.

Justice Southwood was raised in Temora and Wagga Wagga in New South Wales. He was educated at Macquarie University in Sydney, Australia. In 2004 he became the first Northern Territory lawyer to be the president of the Law Council of Australia.

Justice Southwood is a judge of the Supreme Court of the Northern Territory. He practiced as a barrister and was appointed Queen's Counsel in 2000 prior to being appointed a judge of the Supreme Court of the Northern Territory. Justice Southwood is also a Foundation Fellow of the Australian Academy of Law; past president of the Law Council of Australia and past president of the Law Society of the Northern Territory.
