= Taiwan International Ethnographic Film Festival =

Film festival in Taiwan

The Taiwan International Ethnographic Film Festival (TIEFF; Chinese: 台灣國際民族誌影展) is the oldest and longest running international ethnographic film festival in Asia. Founded in 2001 in collaboration with Academia Sinica, the biennial festival features new and classic works from ethnographic filmmakers around the world.

Each year, the festival is organized around a central theme, curating a selection of films and discussions that explore a specific aspect of human life. TIEFF also features a “New Visions” category, highlighting notable ethnographic films produced within the past two years. Although the selection process is highly competitive, the festival does not include a competition, emphasizing that each film is presented as equally valuable.

TIEFF is organized by the Taiwan Association of Visual Ethnography (TAVE), a non-profit organization that works to raise public awareness around documentary and ethnographic films. With this foundation, TIEFF functions as a platform for education, dialogue, community building, and international exchange.. The festival has also been a source of consistent support for indigenous cinema in Taiwan, promoting upcoming directors and introducing local works to international audiences.

== Festival themes ==
Each year the festival curates a selection of films around a specific topic. Past themes include:

- 2019: Visions of Sovereignty
- 2017: Beyond the Human
- 2015: Scenes of Life
- 2013: Beyond Borders
- 2011: Suffering and Rebirth
- 2009: Body and Soul
- 2007: Indigenous Voices
- 2005: Family Variations
- 2003: Migration Story
- 2001: Island Odyssey
