= Supreme Court of the Northern Territory =

Superior court for the Northern Territory of Australia

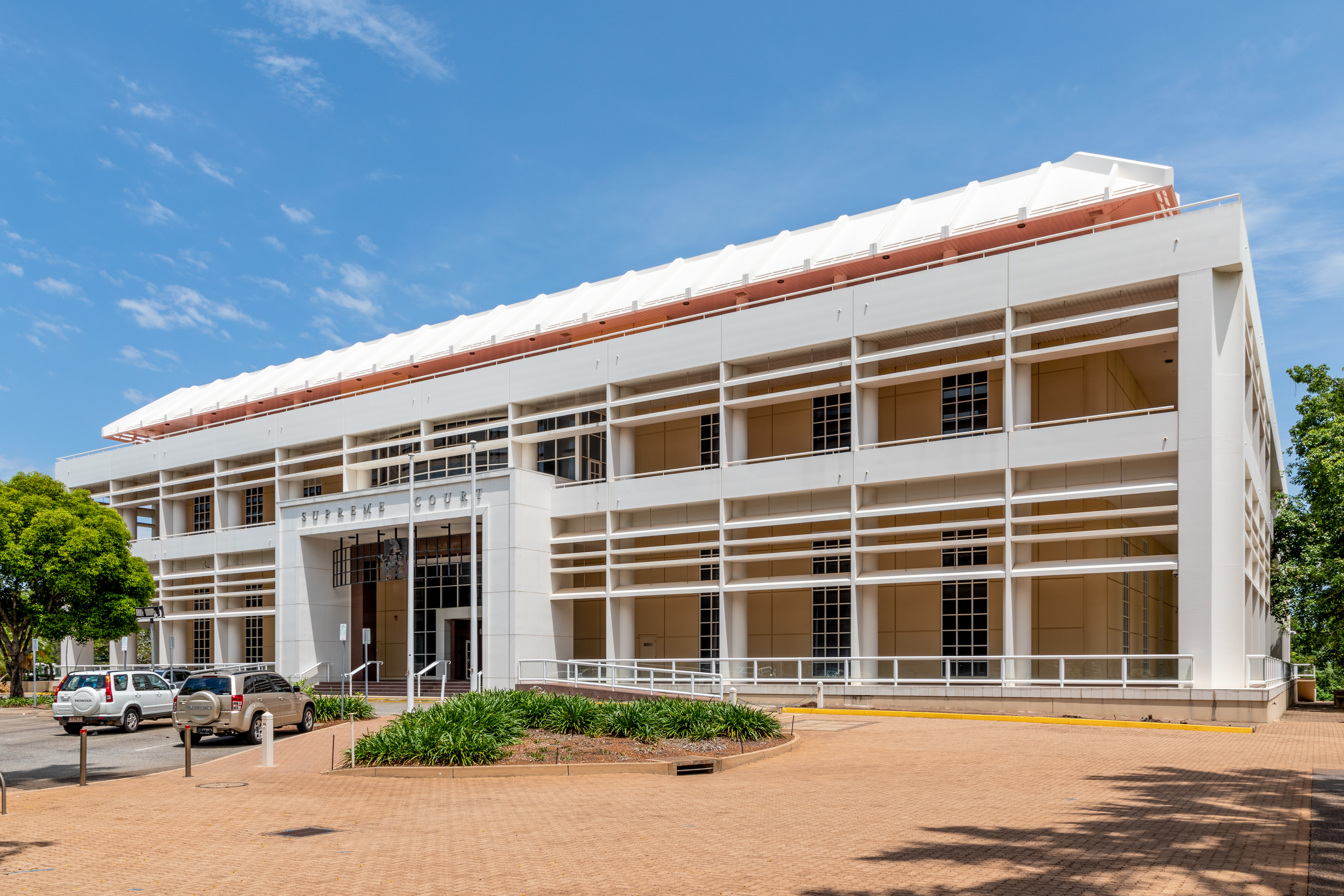
- Northern Territory Supreme Court Building
- Interactive map of Supreme Court of the Northern Territory
- 12°28′00″S 130°50′38″E
- Established: May 30, 1911
- Jurisdiction: Northern Territory
- Location: Darwin
- Coordinates: 12°28′00″S 130°50′38″E
- Composition method: Appointed by the Administrator on the advice of the Attorney-General
- Authorised by: Parliament of the Northern Territory via the: Supreme Court Act 1979 (NT)
- Appeals to: High Court of Australia
- Appeals from: Local Court of the Northern Territory
- Judge term length: Mandatory retirement by age of 75
- Number of positions: 6
- Website: https://supremecourt.nt.gov.au/

Chief Justice of the Northern Territory.
- Currently: Michael Grant
- Since: July 2016

The Supreme Court of the Northern Territory is the superior court for the Australian Territory of the Northern Territory. It has unlimited jurisdiction within the territory in civil matters, and hears the most serious criminal matters. It is around the middle of the Australian court hierarchy.

== Early history ==
Shortly after the first settlement at Palmerston, Port Darwin in 1869–70, pressure was placed upon the South Australian government to establish a superior court in the then Northern Territory of South Australia. Although such a court was mooted, it was decided to send judges to Palmerston on circuit. The first circuit court was held in February 1875.

Thereafter, from 1875 to 1884, the government appointed persons as commissioners (usually the Government Resident) to exercise the power of a judge of the Supreme Court of South Australia in all but trials of capital offences.

From 1884 to 1911, a resident judge, with the title "Judge of the Northern Territory" exercised the full powers of the Supreme Court of South Australia under the Northern Territory Justice Act.

== History ==
The court was established on 30 May 1911, shortly after South Australia surrendered the territory to the Commonwealth. The first judge of the court was Samuel James Mitchell. The only person to hold the office of Chief Judge, which was created in 1975, was Sir William Forster who held the position from 1977-1979. The position title was changed to Chief Justice in 1979, and Forster was the first Chief Justice from 1979-1985. There have been six chief justices since 1979. There are currently six resident judges (including the Chief Justice) and two additional judges and two acting judges, making a total of ten Supreme Court justices.

In 1927, when the Northern Australia 1926 Act (Cth) came into force, the Northern Territory was divided into two territories; North Australia and Central Australia. The Supreme Court was not abolished, but continued to exist as the Supreme Court of North Australia and the Supreme Court of Central Australia. After the Northern Territory Act was repealed in 1931, the Northern Territory was reconstituted as a single Territory of the Commonwealth. The Supreme Court of Central Australia was abolished and the Supreme Court of North Australia continued as the Supreme Court of the Northern Territory.

In 1935 the Court began its first sittings on circuit in Alice Springs, a practice which still continues today. Circuit sittings in Katherine were also introduced in 1996.

== Design ==
=== Mosaic ===
When a new Supreme Court complex was built, Indigenous artist Norah Nelson Napaljarri was chosen to design a mosaic for its forecourt.

=== Architecture ===
The design concept of the Supreme Court, as requested by the client the Northern Territory Government, was to reflect the elements of the "Greek Revival" Hong Kong Shanghai Bank constructed in Hong Kong in the 1800s viz: the colonnade around the building, the mansard roof and the portico entrance as well as giving reference to its tropical location and its colonial past.

The collaborating architects were Peter Doig, Ron Findlay and Roger Linklater: the interior was designed by Susie Cole. The architectural style is best described as Neo-colonial.

=== Ceremonial larrakitj (hollow-log coffins) ===
In June 2003, nine ceremonial larrakitj (hollow- log coffins) were installed in the Supreme Court of the Northern Territory during a historic Wukidi (reconciliation) ceremony, which was authorised by the Chief Minister of the Northern Territory, Clare Martin.

The ceremony forms the climax of the documentary film Dhakiyarr vs The King, co-directed by Tom Murray and Allan Collins. The film is about the Yolngu leader Dhakiyarr Wirrpanda. Seventy years after his controversial 1934 murder trial in the Supreme Court of the Northern Territory and subsequent disappearance, Dhakiyarr's body has still not been found.

In June 2003, more than 200 Yolŋu people followed in Dhakiyarr's "footsteps" (as described in the film), from Arnhem Land to Darwin, to restore Dhakiyarr's honour and confront historical injustices. They were joined by 30 descendants of Albert McColl, the policeman Dhakiyarr speared under Yolngu law seventy years before, as well as Chief Minister Martin, judges from the Northern Territory Supreme Court and the High Court of Australia. The nine ceremonial larrakitj (hollow-log coffins) were permanently installed in the foyer of Supreme Court of the Northern Territory to guide Dhakiyarr's spirit home to his ancestral land and to heal the wounds cause by this historic event. The larrakitj were prepared by prominent Yolŋu artists and clan leaders, including Dhukal Wirrpanda and Wuyal Wirrpanda (Dhakiyarr's grandsons from the Dhudi-Djapu clan), Gawirrin Gumana AO (Dhalwangu clan), Djambawa Marawili AM (Madarrpa clan), Miniyawany Yunupingu (Gumatj clan), Menja Munungurr (Djapu clan), Wanyubi Marika (Rirratjiŋu clan), and Wukun Wanambi (Marrakulu clan). It was in the Supreme Court of the Northern Territory where Dhakiyarr was once made 'invisible'. Or, as Wirrpanda described it, where "they treated him like a man without a footprint".

In March 2025, after a cold case investigation by the Northern Territory Police, the Northern Territory Coroner handed down a finding that Dhakiyarr died on or about 10 November 1934 but that the exact cause of death could not be determined due to the passage of time. Unsatisfied with the ruling, Dhakiyarr's descendant Dhukal Wirrpanda and Djambawa Marawili AM called on the Northern Territory Government to officially recognise the death as an Aboriginal death in custody. In December 2025 Northern Territory police announced a new investigation into the mysterious disappearance of Dhakiyarr Wirrpanda.

== Other ==
The Supreme Court occasionally sits in other locations in the Northern Territory, including Katherine, Tennant Creek and Nhulunbuy. The Supreme Court has also on occasion sat at remote Aboriginal communities.

The Supreme Court includes the Court of Appeal, Court of Criminal Appeal, Civil and Criminal Trials and Appeals from the Local Court of the Northern Territory

Judgments from Supreme Court trials are available to the public, as are the sentencing remarks, unless a suppression order has been taken preventing these being released (for example, involving juveniles, public figures or in some controversial matters).

== Judges of the Supreme Court of the Northern Territory ==
As at 1 January 2025:

=== Chief Justice ===
Name	Date appointed
Chief Justice Michael Grant AO	5 July 2016

=== Judges ===
Name	Date appointed
Justice Stephen Southwood	31 January 2005
Justice Judith Kelly AO	12 August 2009
Justice Jenny Blokland AO	9 April 2010
Justice Sonia Brownhill	2 November 2020
Justice Meredith Day Huntingford	June 2024

=== Additional Judges ===
Name	Date appointed
Justice John Reeves	May 2009
Justice John Burns	May 2020
Justice Peter Barr	

=== Acting Judges ===
Name	Date appointed
Acting Justice Trevor Riley AO	1 January 2025
Acting Justice Graham Hiley AM RFD	1 January 2025
Acting Justice Alan Blow AO	1 January 2025
Acting Justice Lex Lasry AM	1 January 2025

=== Associate Judge ===
Name	Date appointed
Vince Luppino	2009
Craig Smyth	acting from 13 February 2025

== See also ==
- Family Court of Australia
- Federal Court of Australia
- Judiciary of Australia
- List of Judges of the Supreme Court of the Northern Territory
