= Australian Teachers of Media =

Non-profit professional association and publisher

The Australian Teachers Of Media or ATOM is an independent, not-for-profit, teachers association that promotes the study of media and screen literacy. The membership of ATOM includes a collective of educators from across all subject disciplines at all levels of education, the screen media industry and, increasingly, the general public interested in the media.

ATOM aims to foster and encourage a generation of students who are both media-literate and technologically savvy.

The Victorian chapter is responsible for the ATOM Awards that have been presented annually since 1982. The awards celebrate the best of Australian screen content from and for the education sector and screen industry professionals. ATOM formerly published Australia's longest running film publications, Metro Magazine and Screen Education; creates and distributes education resources including study guides; and hosts professional development for screen and teachers.

Metro Magazine is an international film and screen culture journal specialising in Australasian and Pacific film. The magazine also covers television, video, multimedia, the Internet and radio. It is a refereed journal that has been published quarterly since 1974. The ISSN is 0312-2654.

Through the publishing of the two magazines, and through convening the ATOM Awards and the ATOM Australian International Multimedia Awards, ATOM actively promotes media literacy in Australia and internationally.
