= Woodah Island =

Island in Northern Territory, Australia

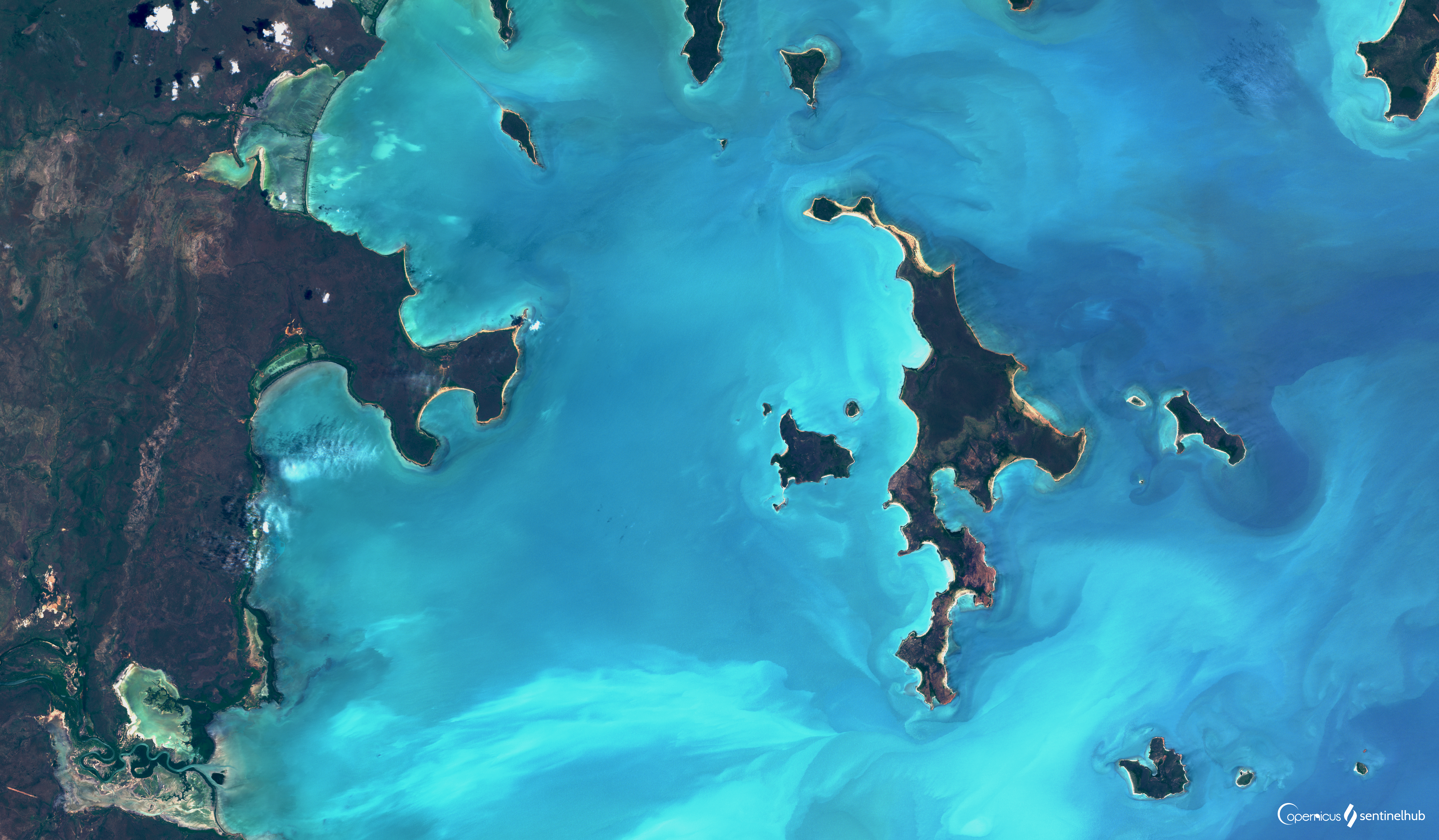
Satellite image of Woodah Island on 3 February 2018.

Woodah Island, also known as Isle Woodah, is an island in Arnhem Land, in the Northern Territory of Australia, lying in the mouth of Blue Mud Bay at 13.44°S 136.16°E. It is located 13.4 km east of Haddon Head on the coast of mainland Arnhem Land. It is 24 km long north–south, and up to 3.5 km wide. The island has an area of approximately 66 km^{2} and a circumference of 87 km.

It is known as the site of some of the killings in the Caledon Bay crisis, which marked a turning point in the relationship between Indigenous and non-Indigenous Australians.
