= Gawirrin Gumana =

Aboriginal artist and activist from Arnhem Land in Australia

Gawirrin Gumana AO
- Born: c. 1935
- Died: 18 November 2016
- Known for: Bark painting, land rights activism, Yirrkala Church Panels
- Parent: Birrikitji Gumana (father)
- Awards: National Aboriginal & Torres Strait Islander Art Award (2002); Order of Australia (2003); Red Ochre Award (2009)

Gawirrin Gumana AO (c. 1935 – 18 November 2016) was an important cultural leader of the Yolngu people and an Aboriginal Australian bark painter known for his use of rarrk. He was also an advocate for the rights of Indigenous Australians in Arnhem Land.

== Early life ==
Gawirrin Gumana, also known as Gawurin, Gouarin, Gawarrin, Gawirrin, Garwirin, Gawerin, and Joe, was born in North Eastern Arnhem Land, Northern Territory, around 1935 in the Yirritja moiety.

Gawirrin was the eldest son of the Dhalwangu clan leader Birrikitji. As a child, Gawirrin used to travel Arnhem Land, going to different areas, including Groote Eylandt, by canoe. It was on one of these journeys, Garwirrin noted to writer Nicolas Rothwell, that his father discovered dead bodies of their fellow clan mates from a dispute over a sacred waterhole with a white overlanding party. His father buried the remains and held a funeral at Blue Mud Bay for the remaining bones, but this experience remained with Gawirrin and helped lead to his political activism.

== Art ==
Gawirrin Gumana's clan, the Dhaḻwaŋu clan, is from the Gäṉgaṉ area. This is a freshwater area consisting of rivers, waterholes, and stringybark eucalyptus forest, which allow him to source bark for art. Gumana's bark art shows the use of rarrk, a form of crosshatching that he perfected. Crosshatching is the use of diagonal lines, in a pattern in which the lines cross each other in an x pattern, to provide depth and texture to a painting. The topics in his paintings would often include ancestral animals such as turtles, fish, crayfish, and herons. He would create paintings that are focused around the sacred watering hole, Blue Mud Bay, and the story of the ancestral hero, Laintjun. The ancestral hero Laintjun taught the meaning of the diamond pattern to the Dhalwangu clan, bringing with him the Yirritja totems. As an artist, he perfected the depiction of water in motion. He uses his authority as a senior artist to create paintings of the coastline, showing how the water changes from the presence of the Djan'kawu Creators, the Sisters, manifested physically as the catfish Walwaltjpa.

Some of Gumana's major works of art include: Lightning snake and barramundi, Turtle hunting, Lanydjung (Ancestral figure), Minhala, the freshwater tortoise, Garrapara, and Lighting Snake. These pieces all feature natural pigments on flattened eucalyptus string bark and contain important symbols, such as the diamond, to his clan. Gumana also created three poles, Djarwarrk, Guyamirrilil and Birrkuda, that stand 300cm tall and are decorated in designs created from natural pigments. These pieces are viewable on the National Gallery of Victoria's webpage. Outside of the National Gallery of Victoria, Gumana's art has been represented in the British Museum, National Gallery of Australia, National Museum of Australia, and the Sydney Opera House.

Between 1996 and 1997, Gumana was one of the artist, commissioned by John W. Kluge, to create a bark painting now featured in the exhibition Maḏayin. His piece, Barama (Yirritja Creation Being), is one of the twenty-nine monumental bark paintings that are still viewable today.

Gawirrin was one of the painters of the Yirrkala Church Panels for the Yirritja moiety. These panels were created by senior Yolngu community elders to proclaim the law and culture of the Yolgnu people long before the missionaries arrived in Arnhem Land. He was the last surviving member of the group that painted the panels in 1962 until his death in 2016. These historic church panels can be viewed at the Buku-Larrnggay Mulka Yirrkala Art Centre.

=== Political activism through art ===
A large focus of Gumana's art was centered around political activism related to the land rights of the people of Arnhem Land. In response to the Australian Government's approval for a Swiss mining company to mine on Yolngu land in the 1960s, the senior Yolngu leaders drafted the Yirrkala bark petitions. The bark paintings consisted of one Yirritja bark and one Dhuwa bark to represent the two moieties of the Yolngu nation. They were crafted on two pieces of stringybark, surrounded by sacred designs, and included the Yolngu and English languages. Gawirrin was responsible for recording the claims to land made by the elders for the Yirritja bark. Ultimately, the Australian government did not recognize the Yolgnu people's right to the land as they claimed the land was Terra Nullius.

In 1996, Gawirrin Gumana, as well as other Yolngu artists, produced a collection of 80 bark paintings to outline the rules of their coastal waters. The decision to make these paintings was sparked by illegal fishing occurring in Blue Mud Bay. These barks served as an official movement to open a federal court case into gaining the rights to the waters along their coastline. For the Yolngu people, these bark paintings are equivalent to legal deeds. Gumana was named the official plaintiff the High Court case Gumana vs. Northern Territory Government. Initially, their motion for ownership was rejected, but in 2008, they appealed the decision, resulting in a landmark court case granting them ownership and control over their coastal waters in Northern Arnhem Land. This was the first time Indigenous sea rights were recognized in Australia. This included all of the land above the high water mark, excluding rivers and estuaries subject to tides, as it was considered land and not sea.

In 2002, Gawirrin created a larrakitj representing the coexistence and reconciliation between Barama and Captain Cook. Depicted on this memorial pole is Barama, an ancestral Yolngu being, at the sacred watering hole located in Blue Mud Bay found in Arnhem Land, and Captain Cook, an Australian settler planting his flag. He shows two faces, but does not specify which face belongs to which person. He includes sacred designs flowing downward towards the earth as a way to show that Barama's law still rules Yolngu land. This purpose of this artwork is to show that the beliefs and rights of the people of Arnhem land, coupled with the differing world views of present-day Australia remains a challenge for both parties.

== Other activities ==
Gawirrin was involved in a range of initiatives aimed at preserving and promoting Aboriginal culture, and was a vocal critic of the Australian government policies that he believed undermined the sovereignty and autonomy of the Yirrkala people in Arnhem Land. He was the last surviving painter connected to the Yirrkala Church Panels.

In 1992, Gumana was ordained a minister of the Uniting Church, as one of the significant leaders, painters and ceremonial elder of the Yolngu people.

== Recognition and honours ==
Gumana was awarded an honorary doctorate from Charles Darwin University.

Gumana was appointed an Officer of the Order of Australia in the 2003 Australia Day Honours in recognition of his "service to the community as a cultural ambassador and religious leader promoting understanding, sharing and mutual respect, to the reconciliation process, and to the arts as a significant contributor to Australia's indigenous artistic heritage".

== Personal life and death ==
During the 1960s, Gawirrin Gumana battled leprosy, which left his body crippled. His life would have been similar to his father, Birrikitji, had he not needed to seek immediate medical attention. He was dispatched to Darwin, first arriving in the Channel Island Leprosarium, and then the East Arm Reserve. It was here that he was married, learned English, and became and Christian. After this experience he notes that, "I have three angles now on life, and I try to make them agree with each other: the Yolngu, the Western and then there is God's, above all, looking down." After his stay here, homesickness overcame him and he arrived at the Yirrkala mission in the north-eastern tip of Arnhem Land.

He died on 18 November 2016.

== Collections ==
- Australian National Maritime Museum
- Kluge-Ruhe Aboriginal Art Collection
- National Gallery of Australia
- National Gallery of Victoria
- National Museum of Australia
