= Blue Mud Bay =

Bay in Northern Territory, Australia

Coordinates: 13.133°S 136.015167°E

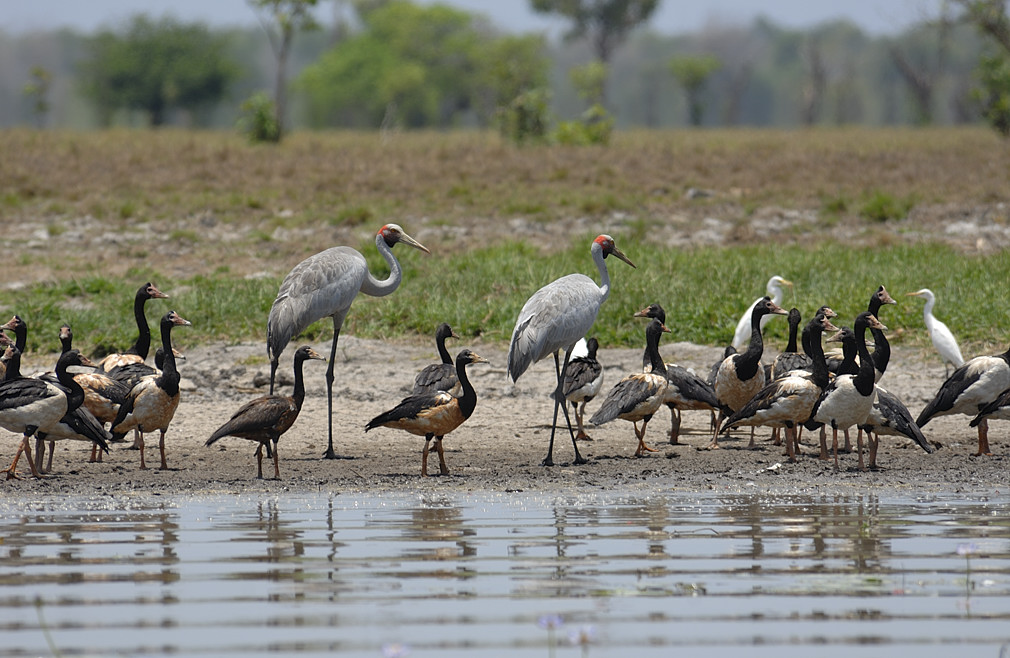
Brolgas, magpie geese and intermediate egrets

Blue Mud Bay is a large, shallow, partly enclosed bay on the eastern coast of Arnhem Land, in the Northern Territory of Australia, facing Groote Eylandt on the western side of the Gulf of Carpentaria. It lies 60 mi (97 km) south of Caledon Bay, 580 km (360 mi) east-south-east of Darwin in the Arnhem Coast bioregion. Its name was given to a landmark court ruling affirming that the Aboriginal traditional owners of much of the Northern Territory's coastline have exclusive rights over commercial and recreational fishing in tidal waters overlying their land.

== Description ==
The bay is about 90 km in length and up to 35 km in width. Its 45 km wide mouth stretches from Cape Shield in the north-east to Cape Barrow in the south-west, with Woodah Island in between. It has a diverse inner coastline of many small bays, inlets, headlands and islands, bordered by intertidal mudflats and mangroves merging into freshwater floodplains. The bay and the adjoining floodplains are held by the Arnhem Land Aboriginal Land Trust as Aboriginal freehold land. The waters of the bay are used for commercial and recreational fishing, especially for mud crabs. The northern part of the bay and its surrounds are part of the Laynhapuy Indigenous Protected Area, which is planned to be extended to include the remainder of the coastal waters and islands of the bay.

== Flora and fauna ==
=== Plants ===
Triumfetta litticola, a plant species endemic to the Arnhem Coast bioregion, has been recorded. The threatened Australian arenga palm (Arenga australasica) is also found here, as well as 34 plant species endemic to the Northern Territory .

=== Birds ===
The bay's seasonally flooded coastal plains have been classified by BirdLife International as an Important Bird Area (IBA). The area covered by the IBA is 45,811 ha. It supports globally important numbers of magpie geese (up to 500,000 individuals), wandering whistling-ducks (up to 40,000), and brolgas (up to 3000).

Many other waterbirds breed in colonies on the floodplain, especially egrets, herons and spoonbills, while the mudflats are used by flocks of migratory waders in summer. Wader species using the site in large numbers include black-tailed godwits, lesser sand plovers and red-necked stints. The islands hold significant breeding colonies of little, black-naped and bridled terns.

=== Other animals ===
The beaches of the bay's larger islands are important for nesting flatback sea turtles. There is a large colony of little red flying foxes in the mangroves at the northern end of the bay. The threatened brush-tailed rabbit rat is present. Douglas' skink (Glaphyromorphus douglasi) is endemic to the Northern Territory. Introduced water buffalos and feral pigs threaten the wetlands.

== Blue Mud Bay case ==
The Blue Mud Bay case, or Blue Mud sea rights case, was the name given to a court case with original reference to the ownership of fishing rights in tidal waters overlying Aboriginal land at Blue Mud Bay. The case was eventually decided by the High Court of Australia on 23 July 2008 when it ruled on an appeal made by the Northern Territory Government, the Commonwealth of Australia and the Northern Territory Seafood Council against a decision made by a lower court in March 2007.

The High Court ruled that the water lying over Aboriginal land should not be treated differently from the land itself. Ownership of Aboriginal land adjoining marine waters in the Northern Territory generally extends to the low tide level. Since people have always had to obtain permission from the traditional owners or the appropriate land council to go on to Aboriginal land, the Court made it clear that such permission is also required to go on to water overlying that land.

This case is significant as it was the first time that native title rights for Indigenous Australians had been recognised over an intertidal zone. The tiny Yolŋu community of Baniyala played a key role in achieving the outcome.

== Fishing and other industry ==
In 2019, the people of Baniyala engaged the CSIRO to investigate industries which could help boost the local economy, including the potential for aquaculture (in particular sea cucumbers), mining, forestry, eco-tourism, and chartered fishing expeditions.

In July 2019, Northern Land Council entered into an agreement with the NT Government for rights over access to the waters for commercial and recreational fishing, before consulting the appropriate traditional owners. After community leader Djambawa Marawili raised the matter, a meeting was held with the NLC, and on the 11th anniversary of the High Court's Blue Mud Bay decision, traditional owners signed an agreement to allow fishing access to these waters for the following 18 months.

In July 2020, the Northern Land Council and the NT Government signed the "Blue Mud Bay Action Plan", by which both are committed to securing fishing rights for the region's Indigenous people. This plan is part of the Nitmiluk Agreement, which aims at building economic opportunities for Aboriginal people in the fishing industry, including establishing an Aboriginal-owned fishing enterprise.

== Garrangali Band ==
The Garrangali Band, from the tiny community of Baniyala on the bay, in their 2020 song "One Voice", sing of the way of life in the region. Mudiny Guyula, the band's lead vocalist, said that the song is about bringing people “back to their promised land, their homeland, so we can recognise who we are”.
