= Djambawa Marawili =

Aboriginal Australian artist

Djambawa Marawili AM
- Born: 1953 (age 72–73); Baniyala, Northern Territory, Australia
- Spouse: Liyawaday Wirrpanda
- Parent(s): Wakuthi Marawili (father), Mulkun Wirrpanda (mother by kinship)

Djambawa Marawili AM (born 1953) is an Aboriginal Australian artist known for bark painting, wood sculpture, and printmaking. He is also a musician, and released an album in 2008.

== Biography ==
Marawili was born in 1953 in Baniyala, also called Yilpara, in East Arnhem Land in the Northern Territory of Australia. He is the son of Wakuthi Marawili, and artist Mulkun Wirrpanda is his mother by kinship. Although he had another name at birth, his father chose the name Djambawa just before he died, a powerful name meaning "the source of the fire on the rock in the sea", and another name, Bumbi, meaning "the rock of the fire". His father taught him how to sing, telling him never to forget to do it, and he taught him about the land and his country.

Marawili's mother by kinship, artist Mulkun Wirrpanda was one of the few women in the Yolngu community who is acknowledged as a leader due to her great knowledge of the Dhuji-Djapu clan, and her father is Dhakiyarr Wirrpanda, a Yolngu leader. She is also an artist, painting on bark, memorial poles, and didgeridoos, and she also has skills in carving, weaving, and printmaking, which have been shown in exhibitions in Australia and Asia.

Marawili is the husband of Liawaday Wirrpanda, and they live in Blue Mud Bay with their children. Wirrpanda is also an artist herself, exhibiting with her mother, Galuma Maymuru. In the Madarrpa clan of the Yolngu, Marawili is a senior leader, facilitating and leading ceremonies.

In addition to leading ceremonies, Marawili ensures the spiritual well-being of his people including members from other clans. Along with knowing his own clan's language, designs, and stories, he also is educated on the other clan's. Acting as an activist and administrator, Marawili serves to connect the Yolngu people and non-Aboriginal people, bringing awareness to the Aboriginal people and serving as a bridge between the two groups.

In the early 2000s, Marawili played a central role in revitalizing the Bäniyala homeland after mining-related economic decline. He worked closely with elders and policy leaders to create sustainable pathways for local development, asserting that culture and economy must support one another.

For Yolngu Indigenous people, he is the Djirrikay - the equivalent of an Archbishop, Chancellor or Premier for Yolngu clans. Marawili draws on his expertise in Yolngu law and culture to lead across many domains.

== Madarrpa clan ==
The Madarrpa clan is a clan in the Yirritja moiety. The clan was connected to the Gumatj and Munyuku clans by Bäru, the ancestral crocodile. According to the ceremonial beliefs of some Aboriginals from Arnhem land, Bäru connected the clans when he created fire for the first time it across the water. As mentioned above, Djambawa Marawili is a senior leader in the clan who is heavily involved in clan ceremonies. Along with Bäru, Mundukul (Burrut'ji), the ancestral lightning snake is a significant symbol during ceremonies. Another motif seen throughout Madarrpa ceremonies is elliptical sand structure (yinyapunapu). As a Madarrpa elder, by kinship, Djambawa has the rights to paint the sacred design of the Madarrpa clan, his märi. The association of märi-gutharra asserts custodianship of sacred knowledge belonging to the daughter’s daughter’s clan, serving as a safeguard for ancestral knowledge. This relationship of märi-gutharra makes it possible for Marawili to act as a ceremonial painter for stories that originate from his daughter’s clan, preserving sacred law while transmitting knowledge across generations. Djambawa Marawili certainly reciprocates the respect he gets from his clan. Djambawa Marawili's dad, Wakuthi Marawili, changed his son's name to Djambawa only when he was confident that his son "had the knowledge...had the wisdom" necessary for such an honorable name.

== Career ==
In the early 1980s, Marawili began painting, incorporating the idea of buwuyak, which means faintness or emergence, in his works, which was an innovative change in the Yolngu art tradition. Although Marawili is an innovative Aboriginal artist, he does paint most frequently using traditional ochre, a natural pigment, and a paintbrush made using a small piece of hair tied to a stick. His works also often show the Yathikpa ancestral story of the bay where Bäru, the crocodile, transformed himself from a human to animal form, plunging into the water in a blaze of flames. He has also shown stories such as the Burrit'tji and the rainbow lightning serpent. The 2003–2005 exhibition Source of Fire marked a turning point in Marawili’s career. The works in this show explored fire as both a literal and symbolic element of Madarrpa law. Through bark paintings and sculptures, Marawili interpreted the ancestral moment when Bäru carried fire across the sea, establishing both physical and legal boundaries for his clan.

Marawili is passionate about painting the designs and patterns of his land and country. The patterns he uses in his paintings, which were taught to him by his father and are usually carried down ancestrally, are supposed to represent the country and the area where these stories come from. He paints the place where the Yolngu people know. With works that capture both innovation and tradition, Marawili has become one of the most significant artists from the Yolngu community. Because his works capture tradition and historical meanings, the paintings of Marawili are also used as a source of history and records, especially in the legal battle to protect the right of the Yolngu land. Marawili’s bark paintings, through their use of miny’tji (sacred clan designs), were submitted as legal evidence in the Blue Mud Bay sea rights case. His paintings helped demonstrate that Yolŋu people had an enduring, lawful relationship with coastal waters.

His paintings that portray sacred traditional designs demonstrate the right and purpose to speak for and protect their sea and land. Because of this reason, this portrayal shown in the Saltwater: Yirrkala Bark Paintings of Sea Country exhibition played a significant role in the Blue Mud Bay sea rights case where Marawili arranged for the Sea Right claim to the Federal Court in 2004.

Djambawa Marawili emphasized that Yolŋgu art is a reflection of their essence and intellect. He highlights the intricate cultural and political dimensions inherent in his bark artworks. When considering the response to the exhibition of barks in the USA, he praised the American recognition of the timeless essence of ancient Yolŋgu culture and symbols, along with their connection to the land. He also appreciated how Yolŋgu art serves as a conduit for passing down traditional knowledge to America.

Marawili's painting style honors aspects of traditional bark painting while also embracing new methods that provide his works with a flowing sensation. Marawili incorporates the diamond pattern, traditional to the Yirritja moiety, into virtually all of his works but arranges the diamonds in a pattern that emits a flowing sensation to the view and tells a story through the work.

One of Marawili’s most iconic works is Yathikpa, a bark painting that depicts the ancestral fire at the sacred Madarrpa site of the same name. The work visualizes Bäru, the ancestral crocodile who carried fire across the sea, plunging into the water and igniting it with sacred flame. The painting is densely patterned with diamond-shaped designs symbolizing fire, water, and law, and reflects the moment when land, sea, and spirit intersect. Yathikpa has been described as both a ceremonial object and a statement of Indigenous authority over marine territories, and was included in several landmark exhibitions of Yolŋu art.

Marawili has contributed significantly to the revitalization of larrakitj (memorial poles), recontextualizing them as both ceremonial objects and contemporary sculpture. His poles were featured in the international touring exhibition The Inside World as examples of living Yolŋu ceremonial practice adapted to new artistic forms.

== Artistic philosophy ==
Marawili describes his art as a way of asserting Yolŋu law, identity, and ownership. His paintings are acts of legal and cultural authority, especially when depicting designs linked to clan land and sea. As he explains, “the land has grown a tongue”—his paintings give voice to ancestral law and express the spiritual identity of place.

== Activism ==
Marawili is passionate about the socio-political rights of his people and their land. He believes it is important for him to do this because while the land and sea cannot talk, he can, and he must use this platform. As his father died, he told him that he was happy he had the knowledge, both of his culture and of the west which he used to connect the two worlds. Marawili also holds the belief that the government should not be able to tell him what to do because he can learn from them, but they can also learn from him as well. His art is also tied closely to his activism because of the connection between the artistic patterns he painted and the land and sea. This is also portrayed in the Saltwater: Yirrkala Paintings of Sea Country. The show featured eighty works by Yolngu artists depicting their ancestral clan designs, in response to the failed legal cases and harmful treatment of Blue Mud Bay by poachers and trespassers. The show began with an incident from October 1996, when Wäka Munungurr discovered illegal barramundi fishing while inspecting the sacred place of Garranali. Wäka Munungurr reported it to Djambawa Marawili, who decided to channel his disgust and frustration about the invasion of the sacred place by painting the sacred clan designs of the area and leading the other elders and artists in the region to follow suit. Djambawa Marawili spearheaded the show and continued to create works as visual assertions of Yolngu rights to the sea.

The land has everything it needs. But it couldn’t speak. It couldn’t express itself. Tell its identity. And so it grew a tongue. That is the Yolngu. That is me. We are the tongue of the land. Grown by the land so it can sing who it is. We exist so we can paint the land. That’s our job. Paint and sing and dance. So it can feel good to express its true identity. Without us it cannot talk. But it is still there. Only silent. — Djambawa Marawili AM

In 1997, Djambawa Marawili AM, the leader of the Madarrpa clan, made a significant discovery on his land: an illegal poacher's camp with a decapitated crocodile. This incident took place in the very heart of the Madarrpa's revered territory, which is considered the mythical nesting site of their sacred crocodile totem, Baru. In response to this violation, forty-seven Yolŋu artists representing fifteen clans and eighteen homeland communities in North-East Arnhem Land came together to share their cultural wisdom and deep connection to the land and sea. They expressed these profound ties through elaborate patterns and designs known as Miny'tji, creating a remarkable series of paintings now known as the 'Saltwater Collection'.

His saltwater bark paintings were used as a campaign to educate people about the Yolngu people and their sacred land. This campaign was taken further and the Yolngu people began to initiate a court case in order to get recognition to their own land. Marawili contributed to this collection with his art work as well and attended the federal court hearing in Canberra. The court ended up not ruling in the Yolngu people's favour and they were not granted the rights to their land. However, they appealed the decision in 2008 the Yolngu people gained legal ownership to the intertidal zone, between high and low tide marks.

A large political problem facing the area was the bauxite and manganese mines being built so close to Aboriginal land. Nhulunbuy, the large bauxite mine, is only 100 meters from Lawnhapuy Homelands and about three hours from Blue Mud Bay, where Marawili lives. Along with the manganese mines located in Groote Eyelandt which is east of Blue Mud Bay. This was very concerning for Marawili and he worries about the absence of work opportunities for the Yolngu people, the decline in education, and the increase in health problems. His main desires for his community are for them to have better education so that people are better able to get jobs and, in turn, he also wants a stronger economic base. Marawili has continued to work hard within his community and outside of it to help his community prosper.

== Journey to America (Americalili Marrtji) ==
Among Djambawa Marawili's most notable artworks is his 2019 piece, Journey to America, for which we won first prize at the National Aboriginal and Torres Strait Islander Art Awards. This piece is painted on an enormous slab of eucalyptus bark measuring 270 x 100 cm. In accordance with most of his other art, he uses natural ochres for colour. The piece, which was commissioned for the 2017–19 Kluge–Ruhe Madayin Commission in Charlottesville, VA, was a personal assessment of Djambawa's crucial contribution to the creation of the University's exhibition, where the water moves, where it rests. Djambawa Marawili has spearheaded the effort of Yolngu people and artists in making connections with the United States art realm, as seen through his history with the University of Virginia. Marawili spoke to what Journey to America means to him:

“It's really important to represent our clan groups and our tribes. Sharing the knowledge of this country. The art is still alive. The songs are still alive. The language is still alive. The connections are still alive. I reach out to other cities across the sea…I felt that I had to carry this. Even in my soul, even in my mind [I] have to carry this and reach out to the other world. It is really important for me I have to be really confident with my own patterns and designs. I think it is really written in my soul and it is written in my blood.” (Djambawa Marawili)

Marawili notes how his tangible connection with the ancestors of the Madarrpa clan has inspired him to share their brilliance with other cultures. In Journey to America, Marawili portrays a fusion of Aboriginal culture and artistic motifs with symbols of the European world like the Statue of Liberty. The Statue of Liberty is painted at the very top of the bark. However, the main subject of the painting is a depiction of Bäru, the ancestral crocodile, which spans the majority of the bark surface. On the back of Bäru and throughout the rest of the painting, Djambawa Marawili portrays the chained diamond design which is common throughout the Yirritja moiety's art and culture. Bäru is known for creating fire and sending it across the water to different clans (See Madarrpa Clan section). Marawili's mastery is demonstrated through his ability to create a sense of movement in this two-dimensional, static piece of art. In the bottom left corner of the painting is the Coat of Arms of Australia.

== Residency ==
In October 2016, Djambawa Marawili worked as a resident artist at the University of Virginia. Marawili was glad to see the popularity of Aboriginal art in the United States, as Charlottesville is one of America's hotspots for Aboriginal Art. UVA Law students had the opportunity to witness and learn from his experience with the Blue Mud Bay sea rights case. During his residency, he collaborated with University of Virginia printmaking students to create new work. Two of Marawili's pieces now reside permanently in the Kluge-Ruhe Aboriginal Art Collection. Djambawa Marawili's residency at Charlottesville was reminiscent of when John Mawurndjal appeared on the cover of Time magazine in 2005. When John Mawurndjal appeared on Time magazine, he, in many ways, introduced Aboriginal and Arnhem Land art to the global art scene. Djambawa's relationship with the University of Virginia and the greater Charlottesville area is a microcosm of the connection between Aboriginal Art and the European world.

== Djambawa Marawili:"The Rock Of Fire" ==
His art and work eventually is recognized and displayed in the documentary: "The Rock of Fire". The film follows Djambawa Marawili's life as he displays his renowned art, featuring bark paintings drawing their significance from the ancestral culture. As well, the documentary shows Djambawa Marawili activism for the Yolngu land and sea rights. Following legal battles such as, the Blue Mud Bay case, Djambawa Marawili the documentary emphasizes his connection to both the Yolngu people and land. The film shows his life in high regard displaying his importance in both aboriginal art and culture. His story seen as inspiration for indigenous people world wide, proving people can and should stand up for their land and cultural rights.

== Music ==
In 2008, Djambawa Marawili released an album titled "Yilpara, The Mulka Manikay Archives". The album contains 14 songs and runs one hour and 19 minutes in length. The songs are listed below

1. Gapu Mungurru (Rough Waves)
2. Dhupuntji (Log)
3. Yirriwi (Dugong)
4. Baru (Crocodile)
5. Minyga (Garfish)
6. Barrakbarrak (Dotterel)
7. Makani (Queenfish)
8. Walurngu (Frigate Bird)
9. Djet (Sea Eagle)
10. Lipalipa (Paddling)
11. Bunburrkthun (Walking to the Shade)
12. Gathiritj (Mangrove Bird)
13. Nhinamarrtji (Sitting Under the Shade)
14. Wangupini (Cloud Rising from the North)

== Other roles ==
Outside of his life as an artist, Marawili has served in many leadership roles to support and bring an awareness to the Indigenous community. Roles have included:

- Arnhem Northern and Kimberley Artists (ANKA) Chairperson (1998– )
- Buku-Larrnggay Mulka Chairperson at Yirrkala (1994-2000, 2016-2018), board member (2001-2016)
- Laynhupuy Homelands Committee Chairperson (1995-1997, 2018)
- Northern Land Council Councillor (1995-1997)
- Nambara Homelands School Board Member
- Australia Council Aboriginal and Torres Strait Islander Board (2008-2009)
- YBE Enterprises Board Member
- Yipara-Laynhupuy Homelands CDEP supervisor
- Appointed member of the Prime Minister's Indigenous Advisory Council, in both its first (2013–2017) and second (2017– ) terms.

== Recognition ==
Marawili has won numerous awards with his significant paintings. These include the National Aboriginal and Torres Strait Islander Art Award (NATSIAA) first in 1996, and then again in 2019 with Journey to America, a stringybark piece. Marawili is often cited by scholars as a central figure in the post-land rights generation of Aboriginal artists who successfully merged traditional law with new platforms for political engagement. Other roles and recognition of his work as an artist and a community leader include:

- Australia Council, Aboriginal and Torres Strait Islander Arts Fellowship (2003)
- Member of the Order of Australia (2010)
- Opened the Tarnanthi Festival of Contemporary Aboriginal and Torres Strait Islander Art at the Art Gallery of South Australia in Adelaide (2019)
- Lead curator for Madayin: Eight Decades of Aboriginal Bark Painting from Yirrkala, Australia, scheduled to tour North America from 2021, the first significant collection of bark painting to tour outside Australia
- Red Ochre Award for Lifetime Achievement in Cultural Advocacy and Leadership (2026)

== Collections ==
Marawili's work is represented in the following galleries and other institutions:

- Kelvingrove Art Gallery and Museum, Glasgow, Scotland
- Kluge-Ruhe Aboriginal Art Collection, University of Virginia, USA
- President of India Art Collection
- National Gallery of Australia, Canberra
- National Gallery of Victoria, Melbourne
- Art Gallery of Western Australia, Perth
- National Maritime Museum, Sydney
- Northern Territory Supreme Court, Darwin
- Art Gallery of New South Wales, Sydney
- Holmes à Court Collection, Margaret River, WA
- Queensland Art Gallery, Brisbane

Marawili’s works are widely studied in the context of Aboriginal art history. Scholars have emphasized how his use of ancestral design merges spiritual law with political expression, reinforcing Indigenous rights through contemporary art.

== Significant exhibitions ==
- Saltwater: Yirrkala Bark Paintings of Sear Country (1999-2001)
- Buwayak-Invisibility in Annandale Galleries(2003)
- Source of Fire in Annandale Galleries (2005)
- Asia Pacific Triennial of Contemporary Art in Queensland Art Gallery (2006-2007)
- One sun, one moon in Art Gallery of New South Wales (2007)
- Larrakitj (memorial poles) in Art Gallery of Western Australia (2009)
- Australia in Royal Academy of Arts (2013)
- Lorr in Art Gallery of New South Wales (2015)
- Where the Water Moves, Where it Rests at Kluge-Ruhe Aboriginal Art Collection (2015-2016)
- The Inside World: Contemporary Aboriginal Australian Memorial Poles, Nevada Museum of Art and touring (2019)
