= Nonggirrnga Marawili =

Australian painter and printmaker

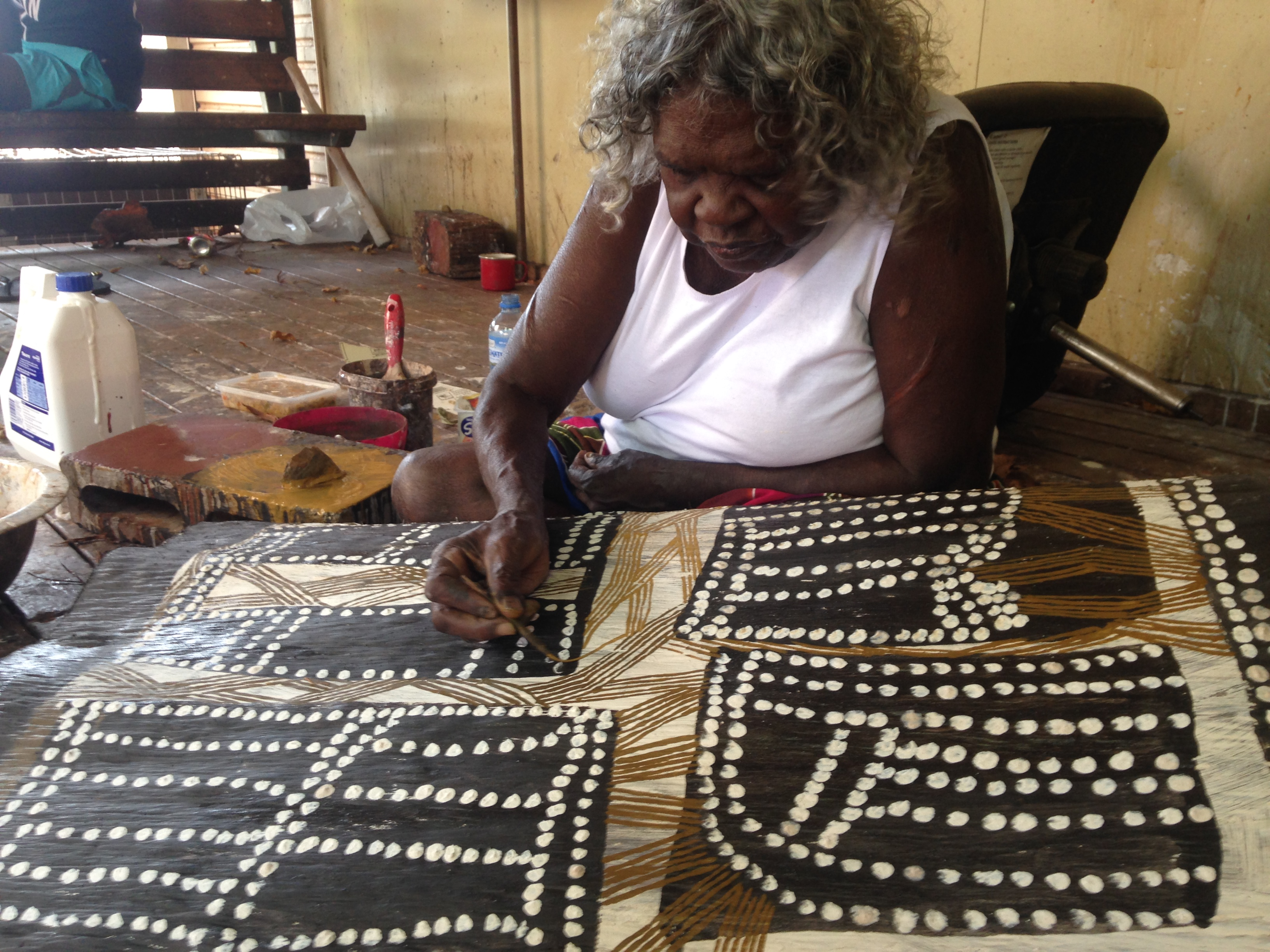
- Marawili working at the Buku-Larrnggay Mulka Art Centre at Yirrkala
- Born: c.1939
- Died: October 2023
- Spouse: Djutadjuta Mununggurr
- Children: 3, including Marrnyula Mununggurr and Rerrkirrwanga Mununggurr
- Parent(s): Mundukul Marawili (father), Balungguwuy Gurruwiwi (mother)

Nonggirrnga Marawili (c. 1939–2023) was an Australian Yolngu painter and printmaker.

== Early life ==
Nonggirrnga Marawili was born around 1939, the daughter of the acclaimed artist and pre-contact warrior Mundukul. Marawili was born on the beach at Darrpirra, near Djarrakpi (Cape Shield), as a member of the Madarrpa clan of the Yirritja moiety of the Yolngu people.

She grew up in both Yilpara and Yirrkala in Arnhem Land in the Northern Territory, but lived wakir', meaning her family would move frequently, camping at Madarrpa clan-related sites between Blue Mud Bay and Groote Eylandt. Marawili died at Yirrkala in October 2023.

== Career ==
=== Early work and clan designs ===
Marawili learnt how to paint on bark in the 1980s while assisting her husband, Djutadjuta Mununggurr, with his artwork depicting his designs from the Djapu clan. During this time, they both played an integral role revitalising Yolngu art practice, which had grown stale due to repetitiveness and the tourist market. By securing permission to paint Dhuwa/Djapu clan designs through working with her husband, Marawili stands as a critical figure in breaking down gender barriers in Yolngu history, as traditionally, these clan designs were the exclusive province of men. In her practice she depicts the sacred forms from her Madarrpa heritage and the stories shared with her by her father, Mundukul, and late husband.

=== Printmaking ===
Marawili's printmaking career started after art-coordinator Andrew Blake opened the Yirrkala Print Space in 1995. These prints feature both aspects of daily life and aspects of various clans including Djapu, Madarrpa and Galpu. As printmaking is done mechanically, the Elders Council of the art centre stated that the miny'tji, or sacred clan designs, would be forbidden in the print space and must be painted by hand on barks instead. Miny'tji are a part of the landscape and act as a visual representation of ancestral power for the Yolngu. As a result of the restriction on printmaking, many of Marawili's works included references to clan designs without explicitly reproducing them. Between the years of 1998 and 2015 she has created 21 prints including screen prints, etchings, and woodblock prints. Some notable print works of hers are Garrangali (1998), Bäru (1999) and Guya (2001).

Blake also brought back the tradition of "big barks" at Yirrkala which renewed the community's interest in bark painting. Previously, the primary form of barks were small paintings for tourists known as "suitcase barks". This led Nonggirrnga to her first solo commission, Banumbirr, Morning Star, in 1994. She was then commissioned by John Kluge in 1996, creating Djapu, Galpu Ties which was a collaborative work with fellow artists Rerrkirrwanga and Marrnyula Mununggurr. As the name suggests, this work was about ties between her husband's clan, Djapu, and her mother's clan, Galpu.

=== Regular painting and critical acclaim ===
While she began her career in the 1990s, Marawili began painting regularly only in 2005. After encouragement from the art-coordinator Will Stubbs, she created Wititj (2005) and Untitled (2005) which demonstrate her ability to avoid painting the strictly traditional designs but rather subtly reference them. She claimed that these patterns were from her heart and mind, not depictions of sacred clan designs. Works like these demonstrate Nonggirrnga's Yolngu ability to "acknowledge that change happens on the surface [and] embrace it imaginatively and productively. But...view the principles and laws laid down by the ancestral beings as an eternal template that underpins their stewardship of their country."

In 2011 she began to paint at the courtyard of Buku-Larrnggay Mulka Centre. This gave her the ability to explore and experiment to find her personal art style. Marawili reached acclaim soon after her 2013 exhibit And I am still here held at Alcaston Gallery in Melbourne which featured fifteen paintings and four larrakitj (memorial poles). These painted works featured in this exhibit combine elements of Djapu designs, such as cross-hatching and lattice (like that of traditionally woven twigs), and Madarrpa, such as diamonds (also associated with the Yirritja moiety). These works also share the theme of hunting, seen through the subject matter of teacups, teapots, and dilly-bags. Despite traditionally-based themes, Marwili still claimed that these are designs of her own, not traditional. Madarrpa clan leader Djambawa Marawili said of these designs, "you can see the pattern [of the Madarrpa miny’tji ]. They are not the patterns, but the country is still speaking through her.” In a 2013 interview she stated that the fire she painted is "just an ordinary fire, not a Madarrpa fire". In 2015 she had her Manhattan debut with her diptych Baratjala (2014) at the James Cohan Gallery in the exhibit All Watched Over.

=== Bark painting prize winner ===
Marawili was a two-time winner of the bark painting prize at the National Aboriginal and Torres Strait Islander Art Awards, winning the award in 2015 for her work Lightning in the Rock (which was subsequently acquired by the National Gallery of Victoria) and again in 2019 for the painting Lightning Strikes. She also won the Bark Painting Award at the 36th Telstra Awards in 2019, one of the most prestigious honours for Aboriginal artists. Marawili is known for distilling "the designs of the Djapu and Madarrpa clans to their essential compositional elements", which is seen through the theme of lightning. This theme is associated with the Madarrpa's Lightning Snake (also known as Burrut'tji or Mundukul), an ancestral snake who uses lightning and thunder to communicate with other ancestral snakes.

The barks featured in Marking the Infinite: Contemporary Women Artists from Aboriginal Australia depict lightning, water, fire, and rock, which are key to sacra, or Madarrpa sacred laws; however, she deviates from conventions of traditional painting. She once said "The painting that I do is not sacred. I can’t steal my father’s [sacred Madarrpa] paintings. I just do my own designs from the outside. Water. Rock. Rocks which stand strong, and the waves which run and crash upon the rock. The sea spray. This is the painting I do... But I know the sacred designs". In the Yolngu bark tradition, there is a distinction between sacred, secret knowledge and knowledge shared with the public. Marawili explained that she "can only talk of the surface part of the story". However, since 2015 she has been granted the ability to paint some clan designs that connect the Madarrpa to the estate of Baratjula which was a seasonal camp for Marawili as a child and is associated with ancestral trade with Macassan merchants.

=== 2019 solo exhibition and book ===
In 2019 an exhibition titled Nonggirrnga Marawili: From My Heart and Mind was held at the Art Gallery of New South Wales. In his review, Sydney Morning Herald art critic John McDonald considered her "one of the most dynamic Indigenous artists at work today". The exhibition was documented in a stand-alone book of the same name. In 2020 her work was featured at the Sydney Biennale at the Campbelltown Arts Center and the Museum of Contemporary Art Australia.

=== 2021 Bark Ladies exhibition ===
Marawili continued to ignite public discourse on Aboriginal art when she teamed up with fellow women of the community Mulkun Wirrpanda and Dhambit Mununggurr to produce and paint 16 larrakitj for the 2021 exhibition Bark Ladies: Eleven Artists from Yirrkala at the NGV. Traditionally used for as ceremonial bone containers, these hollow log coffins had been painted blue, magenta, and green with intricate designs to evoke the movement of ancestral beings. Their grid like placement mirrors her paintings of fish-traps that accompanied the exhibit, harking back to traditional Yolngu culture through unique new mediums. As posited by Henry F. Skerritt and Hetti Perkins, Marawili and her contributors' place outside the traditional patriarchal structure has allowed them to be the "dynamic backbone" of Aboriginal artwork in the modern day, as they work around the rules set in place.

== Collections holding works by Marawili ==
Marawili's works are held in the collections of the National Gallery of Australia, the Auckland Art Gallery Toi o Tāmaki, the Museum of Contemporary Art, the Metropolitan Museum of Art, the Kluge-Ruhe Aboriginal Art Collection of the University of Virginia, the National Gallery of Victoria and the Art Gallery of New South Wales.

== Significant exhibitions ==
- 2013: And I am still here. Alcaston Gallery, Melbourne, Vic
- 2015: All watched over. James Cohan Gallery, Manhattan, NYC
- 2016-2019: Marking the Infinite: Contemporary Women Artists from Aboriginal Australia. Newcomb Art Museum, Tulane University, New Orleans, LA; Frost Art Museum, Florida International University, Miami, FL; Nevada Museum of Art, Reno, NV; The Phillips Collection, Washington, DC; and the Museum of Anthropology, University of British Columbia, Vancouver, BC, Canada.
- 2017: Defying Empire: 3rd National Indigenous Art Triennial. National Gallery of Australia, Canberra, ACT.
- 2018-2019: Nonggirrnga Marawili: From My Heart and Mind. Art Gallery of New South Wales, Sydney, NSW.
- 2020: By the Strength of Her Skin. Second Street Gallery, Charlottesville, Virginia.
- 2020: Nirin: The 22nd Biennale of Sydney. Museum of Contemporary Art, Sydney, NSW.
- 2021: Bark Ladies: Eleven Artists from Yirrkala. National Gallery of Victoria, Victoria.
- 2022-2025: Maḏayin: Eight Decades of Aboriginal Australian Bark Painting from Yirrkala. Hood Museum of Art at Dartmouth College; American University Museum at the Katzen Arts Center; Fralin Museum of Art at the University of Virginia; and the Asia Society in New York City

== Collections ==
- Art Gallery of New South Wales
- Metropolitan Museum of Art, New York
- Museum and Art Gallery of the Northern Territory
- National Gallery of Australia
- National Gallery of Victoria
- Kluge-Ruhe Aboriginal Art Collection of the University of Virginia
