= Dhambit Mununggurr =

Australian Yolngu artist

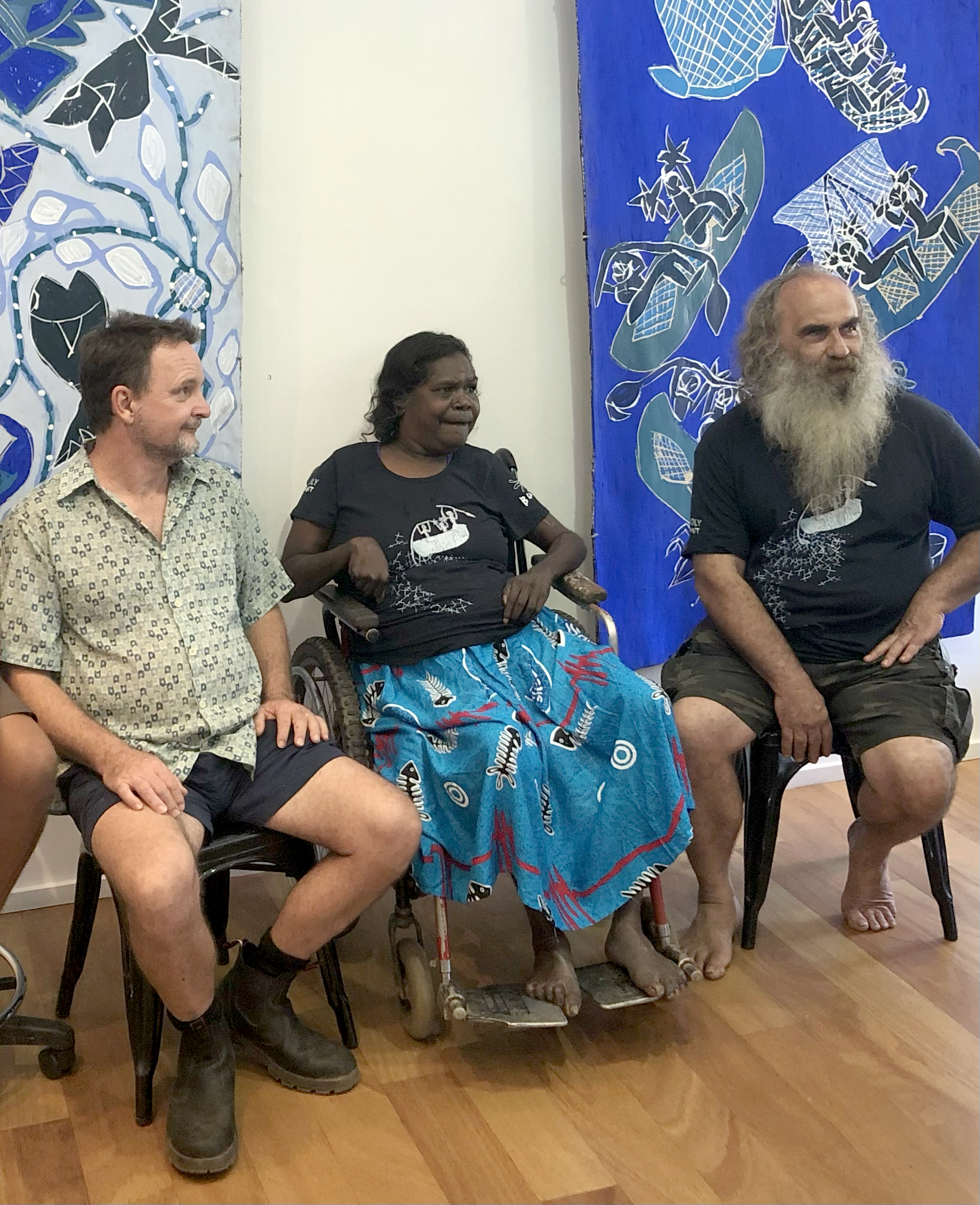
- Dhambit Mununggurr at her exhibition opening at Salon Art Projects, Darwin, August 9, 2019 with Buku-Larrnggay Mulka art co-ordinator Will Stubbs (left) and her husband Tony Gintz (right)
- Born: 1968 (age 57–58)
- Known for: Bark painting, larrakitj
- Spouse: Tony Gintz
- Parents: Mutitjpuy Munungurr (father); Gulumbu Yunupingu (mother)

Dhambit Mununggurr (born 1968) is a Yolngu artist of the Gupa-Djapu clan known for her unique ultramarine blue bark paintings inspired by natural landscapes and Yolngu stories and legends.

== Early life ==
Dhambit Mununggurr was born in 1968 to Mutitjpuy Munungurr (1932–1993) and Gulumbu Yunupingu (1945–2012), Her father was the first artist to win the award with a bark painting (Djang'kawu) in 1990, and her mother won the award in 2004 for her work Garak, the Universe. Her father was one of the members of the Dhuwa moiety who contributed to the Yirrkala Church Panels (which would lead to the creation of the Yirrkala bark petitions of 1963), and served as a great inspiration for Mununggurr. Her mother, Gulumbu Yunupingu, also inspired her; in an interview posted to YouTube in August 2023 for the exhibition Madayin, Munungurr said that she first began painting in the 1980s "because I've seen my parents painting when I was growing up." Both of Mununggurr's parents were skilled artists, having both won first place in the Telstra National Aboriginal & Torres Strait Islander Art Awards and they were a major influence on her artistic style.

== Career ==
Mununggurr's first paintings were influenced by her mother's clan, featuring imagery of fire, associated with the Gumatj clan to which her mother belonged.

She was credited as an artist in the 2000 film Yolngu Boy.

In 2005, Mununggurr was hit by a car and sustained severe head injuries, leaving her needing a wheelchair and unable to use her right hand to paint. Her recovery consisted of a Western treatment and traditional healing practices, and she entered an intensive rehabilitation program in 2011 at Epworth Rehabilitation in Melbourne, Victoria.

When returning to painting in 2010, she trained herself to paint with her non-dominant left hand, as her condition slowly improved. Her favoring of acrylics was an effect of the accident, with NATSIAA curators agreeing she could no longer grind traditional ochres used for bark painting with her limited dexterity in her right hand. Beginning in acrylic colours of red, orange, and yellow, reminiscent of natural ochre tones, Mununggurr came to her now famous bright blue acrylic in 2019.

In 2015, Alcaston Gallery opened "GAYBADA – My Father Was an Artist," which was a collection of bark paintings and larrakitj inspired by Mununggurr's father's work, which was an inspiration for much of Munungurr's own art.

In 2018, Mununggurr, while working at the Buku-Larrŋgay Mulka Centre, created a large bark painting for The Telstra National Aboriginal & Torres Strait Islander Art Awards (NATSIAA).

In addition to bark paintings, Mununggurr is also known for her Larrakitj(hollow poles). Like her bark paintings, these Larrakitj feature her signature acrylic blue coloring.

Mununggurr is known to show a great deal of individualism in her artistic style. She deviates from tradition materials and style, which sets her apart from other indigenous Australian artists.

In interviews, Mununggurr has described teaching herself to draw again using a blue pen, and watching her parents paint daily as her first form of artistic training. “I watched my dad and mum every day,” she recalled in 2023. “Dhambit can walk, talk, write, paint.” Her choice of blue paint was not just pragmatic, but intentional: she selected six distinct shades: “water blue, midnight blue, cobalt blue, ultramarine, Australian blue, and Australian sky blue”, to reinterpret Gumatj stories in her own style.

In addition to her public-facing exhibitions, Mununggurr maintains a prolific private practice. According to her husband, Tony Gintz, she creates a large volume of paintings in various colors beyond her well-known ultramarine works, storing hundreds of them in a shipping container near her home. Will Stubbs of the Buku-Larrnggay Mulka Centre described her artistic process as “compulsive,” stating that she paints constantly, regardless of whether the works are shown or sold.

Her work was acquired by Artbank in 2018 in a collection which details Mununggurr's life and her familial ties. At the top, her maternal grandfather Mungurrawuy Yunupingu is pictured, and further down her uncles Galarrwuy and Mandawuy are shown. Her mother, Gulumbu Yunupingu, is represented through the stars which show what she had painted on the ceiling of the Musee du Quai Branly in Paris, France. Lastly, Dhambit herself is represented as a monolithic rock on Elcho Island.

== Other activities ==
In 2004, Munungurr became the first Yolngu woman to graduate as a tour guide in Yirrkala.

Mununggurr's late brother and her uncle, Mandawuy Yunupingu, were founders of the Yolngu music group, Yothu Yindi. Her brother is a world renowned player of the didgeridoo.

== Collections ==
- Artbank, Sydney
- Art Gallery of New South Wales, Sydney
- Art Gallery of South Australia, Adelaide
- Art Gallery of Ballarat, Victoria
- Fondation Opale, Switzerland
- Kluge-Ruhe Aboriginal Art Collection of the University of Virginia
- National Gallery of Australia, Canberra
- National Gallery of Victoria, Melbourne
- Rose Art Museum, Brandeis University
- University of Melbourne Art Collection, Melbourne
- The Wesfarmers Collection of Australian Art, Perth

== Significant exhibitions ==
Mununggurr's first solo exhibition, Mirdawarr Dhulan, at the Alcaston Gallery in Melbourne (2011), was named after her experience driving through remnants of burnt-out forest around King Lake with her partner Tony, where she noticed green shoots sprouting from burned trees. The title refers to the "land after fire" and the "regrowth after fire."

In 2020, Mununggurr was represented at the National Gallery of Victoria Triennial with an installation of fifteen bark paintings and nine painted larrakitj (hollow log coffins), titled Can We All Have a Happy Life. Many of her paintings at the exhibition depict stories that had been passed down to her by her parents and Yolngu elders; one of her paintings shows the story of the Makassans—told to Mununggurr by her mother—who traded tobacco with the Yolngu for centuries and fished off the coast of Arnhem Land for sea cucumber, until their fishing was banned by the Australian government in 1907, over fifty years before Mununggurr was born.

Following her participation at the NGV's 2020 Triennial, Mununggurr was invited back to be a part of the National Gallery of Victoria's 2021 exhibition of women artists from Yirrkala, titled Bark Ladies: Eleven Artists from Yirrkala. There, Mununggurr exhibited alongside: Nancy Gaymala Yunupingu, Gulumbu Yunupingu (her mother), Barrupu Yunupingu, Nyapanyapa Yunupingu, Eunice Djerrkngu Yunupingu, Nonggirrnga Marawili, Mulkun Wirrpanda, Naminapu Maymuru-White, Malaluba Gumana, and Dhuwarrwarr Marika. Her works included in the exhibition showcased her various shades of acrylic blues, which she described with the words "water blue, midnight blue, cobalt blue, ultramarine, Australian blue, and Australian sky blue." The newest work exhibited at Bark Ladies by Mununggurr was a portrait of former Australian prime minister Julia Gillard, titled Order, inspired by Gillard's "Misogyny Speech" famously delivered in Australian Parliament in 2012. Julia Gillard herself visited the exhibition to view her portrait and remarked, "There's nothing like seeing it [Mununggurr's Order] in person, to experience the power of it. The speech has had this incredible afterlife. It's about expressing to activists, predominantly women, emotion, energy, galvanizing them for the continued fight for gender equality, so I think that this speaks very powerfully to that urge that we want to live in a more equal world."

Also in 2021, Mununggurr held a solo exhibition titled Durrk – I can fly at Roslyn Oxley9 Gallery in Sydney. The exhibition featured paintings that incorporated political satire, including a diptych titled Welcoming the Refugees / Scott Morrison and the Treasurer, which depicted the prime minister and treasurer being pushed out to sea in a canoe by Yolngu figures. Critic John McDonald praised the work’s “gentle satire” and noted that the exhibition marked a shift in how audiences perceived her, not as a “disabled artist,” but simply “an artist, full stop.”

Other exhibitions of her work include:

- Gaybada - My Father was an Artist, Alcaston Gallery, Melbourne (2015); inspired by her father Mutitjpuy Mununggurr, featuring vibrant bark paintings in larrakitj (hollow poles), crediting her father as the driving force behind her art
- Provenance Does Matter - Living with Contemporary Art, Alcaston Gallery at Gallery 369, Bendigo, Victoria (2016), featuring contemporary photography, video art, paintings, ceramics, and sculptures; along with work by Naomi Hobson, Nonggirrnga Marawili, Angela Tiatia, Judy Holding, Dean Smith, and Greg Semu

== Themes and style ==
Critics have described Mununggurr’s style as a deliberate act of "aesthetic disobedience", a visual language that challenges the boundaries of Yolngu art while staying grounded in cultural frameworks. Quentin Sprague emphasized that while her materials and colors depart from traditional ochres, her subjects continue to reflect ancestral Yolngu systems of knowledge and spirituality. Her work often blurs the line between memory and mythology; pieces like My Grandfather and the Butterflies draw on personal moments and ancestral stories simultaneously.
