= Mununggurr =

Mununggurr is the family name of a number of notable Aboriginal Australians from the Yolngu people of Arnhem Land:

- Dhambit Mununggurr (born 1968), painter known for ultramarine blue bark paintings
- Dhuŋgala Munuŋgurr (died 2024), artist, the last surviving signatory of the Yirrkala bark petitions
- Marrnyula Mununggurr (born 1964), painter of the Djapu clan
- Milkayngu Mununggurr, musician, founder member of Yothu Yindi
- Rerrkirrwanga Mununggurr (born 1971), painter of the Djapu clan
- Wonggu Mununggurr (c.1880–1959), artist and leader of the Djapu clan
