= Marrnyula Mununggurr =

Indigenous Australian painter

- Born: 5 July 1964 (age 61); Yirrkala
- Other names: Watjumi, Mititjpurr, Munuŋgurr
- Known for: Bark painting, printmaking
- Parents: Djutadjuta Mununggurr (father); Nonggirrnga Marawili (mother)
- Relatives: Rerrkirrwanga Mununggurr (sister)
- Family: Djapu’ clan

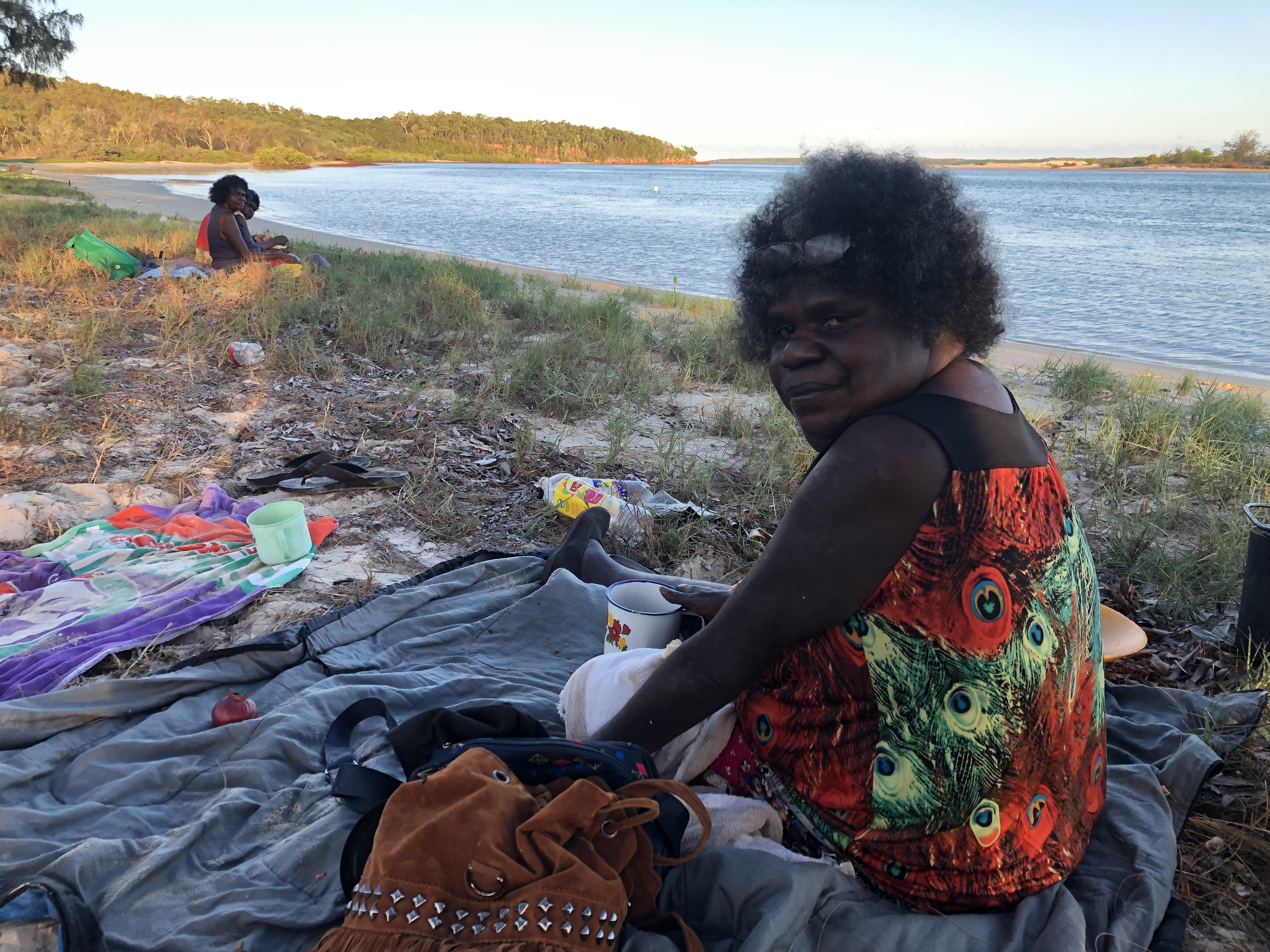
Marrnyula Mununggurr at Binydjarrŋa (Daliwuy Bay), December 2018.

Marrnyula Mununggurr (born 5 July 1964) is an Aboriginal Australian painter of the Djapu clan of the Yolngu people, known for her use of natural ochres on bark and hollow logs, wood carvings, linoleum and screen print productions.

== Biography ==
Born in North East Arnhem Land, Marrnyula Mununggurr is the daughter of renowned artists Djutadjuta Mununggurr and Nonggirrnga Marawili. Wäṉḏawuy is her official homeland in which she first became an artist, trailblazing in their paths. She is a part of the Dhuwa moiety. Wäṉḏawuy is in an outstation belonging to the Djapu'. It is freshwater, inland, and Mäṉa (the shark) is their totem. Although she has no children of her own, Mununggurr was responsible for raising her deceased brother's three children.

Marrnyula Munungurr's paternal grandfather was the Djapu clan leader and artist Wonggu Mununggurr (c. 1880-1959) and her maternal grandfather was the Madarrpa leader and artist Mundukul Marawili.

== Career ==
Mununggurr enrolling at Batchelor as she wanted to be a teacher. She did so and taught at Wandawuy, but she didn't want to travel too much so she seek for another job. Mununggurr currently works at the Buku-Larrnggay Mulka Centre at Yirrkala in Arnhem Land, a position she has occupied since Steve Fox was the art coordinator in the 1980s. From 1995-2011 she was the senior printmaker, trainer and manager of the Yirrkala Print Space, having trained under master printmaker Basil Hall.

Before that, she was known to assist both of her parents in producing their artworks. She learned how to prepare bark and paint her clan designs from her father. While developing her skills as a bark painter, she also taught school children about the Djapu' clan designs. Marrnyula and her mother often assisted her father with his bark paintings, including Djapu’–Gälpu Ties, a bark painting currently on display in the Madayin Exhibit along the family's other works. It is here that she developed her own style in narrative paintings after working on the venerated Djapu paintings, produced by her father, who won Best Bark Painting prize National Aboriginal and Torres Strait Islander Art Award in 1997.

In a profession once predominantly reserved for men, Mununggurr is unique in her field in respect to both her artwork and the fact that she is one of the few female bark painters. She is further known to uphold the traditional paintings and designs of her people, the best exemplification of such being her work Djapu 2013, where she incorporates motifs and techniques observed within the paintings produced by her father (Djutjadjutja Mununggurr) and grandfather (Wonggu Mununggurr). From an early age, it was her father who encouraged her depiction of Djapu' designs, putting a hairbrush (marwaṯ), white clay (gapaṉ), and bark in her hands to begin what would eventually become a career in bark painting.

Mununggurr has partnered with her mother Nonggirrnga Mararwili, to produce the paintings of the Djapu clan design, which was exhibited in 2007 at the Annandale Gallery.

She has also been part of a major contemporary art survey, hosted by the Museum of Contemporary Art in Sydney in 2009, under the title of Making it New: Focus on Contemporary Australian Art. Of the works included in this survey, her bark painting titled Love me Safely had previously been part of a national exhibit in Canberra from 1994 to 1995, called Don’t Leave Me This Way: Art in the Age of AIDS. Since this 1994-1995 exhibit, Munungurr has remained a proponent of Aboriginal and Torres Strait Islanders battling disease and through her work has helped raise awareness regarding these issues.

One of the five artists from Arnhem Land chosen, Mununggurr, took part in the Djalkiri: We are Standing on their names: Blue Mud Bay project (2009-2010). This project was designed to celebrate the Yolngu people of the Yilpara and Blue Mud Bay region, through the commemoration of ancestors by song, dance, paintings and other forms of artistic expression. Here Marrnyula was particular in which artwork she presented, painting her mother’s design of the sailing cloth, a motif intrinsically connected to that of Yilpara and the sea rights ceremony of Blue Mud Bay.

Her exhibition of 252 small bark paintings, titled Ganybu in 2015 at the Gertrude Street Contemporary in Melbourne provided the artist with another opportunity to showcase her Djapu clan design. The grids painted on these small bark paintings reference the fishtrap that caught Mäṉa and the land she comes from. The billabongs, ridges, and high banks of Waṉḏawuy, are painted in natural ochre. This work was subsequently acquired by the National Gallery of Victoria, and included in the exhibition Who's Afraid of Colour?. In 2019, Marrnyula completed another installation, made up of 297 small bark paintings, as a commission for the Kluge-Ruhe Aboriginal Art Collection. The work was exhibited at the 2019 Tarnanthi festival at the Art Gallery of South Australia.

She is also a firm advocate against climate change, helping promote awareness through her artwork like in her shared exhibition Zero Metres Above Sea Level, on display in Sydney since 2016. Through her work, environmentalists and botanists have studied the effects of modern day climate change and on the communities predicted to be most affected by it.

She remains a senior printmaker at Yirrkala Printspace.

Marrnyula has been working with Buku-Larrngay Mulka, a leading studio in printmaking, since the 1980s. She has had pieces installed in Cross Art Projects, Gertrude Contemporary, and the NGV.

== Style ==
Her print works are often identified by her meticulous cross-hatching pattern design on bark mediums, which embody the freshwaters and estuaries of her native land. Such patterns embody the network of waterways, ridges and hills of the landscape. It is also of note that this design is representative of the fish traps typically woven by women used to scoop up fish.

As Marrnyula grew older and began to struggle with mobility issues, she began to explore creating installations of many small bark paintings pieced together. She calls them puzzle work paintings; she created her first one at the Buku art center out of five or six little scraps of bark left by other painters. Since the Ganybu exhibition in 2015, Marrnyula has been associated with innovative installations made up of multiple small barks. Each of these small barks makes up her clan's design, the fish trap that caught Mäna (the ancestral shark) at Wändawuy. Moreover, the grid of the fishtrap, Ganybu, is repeated in the negative space that occurs between the small barks hanging on the gallery wall. Appearing to be camouflaged, the grid is depicted as it is seen by freshwater fish. Marrnyula noted in an interview that smaller bark paintings, contrary to traditionally vast and lone bark painting pieces, are her own idea. She is pursuing her individual style representing the same miny'tji in Djapu' paintings due to the new influx of women in this traditionally man-held space. In 2019, her work of over 200 barks was installed at the Tarnanthi Festival in Adelaide at the Art Gallery of South Australia.

In addition to her iconic puzzle work style, she also paints larrakitj (hollow logs). She paints the designs she inherited from her grandfather, Wonggu Mununggurr. While staying true to her clan designs, she also manages to make her works her own, distinct from that of her sisters' and other female artists.

Maintaining a deep veneration of the spirits and lore, these themes have been incorporated into her artwork, helping reveal the importance of the landscape to these communities. Marrnyula often creates art inspired by her clan totem. The Djapu’ clan's totem is the Mäṉa, ancestral sharks. These sharks' travels connect the people of different clans. These designs are apparent in her puzzle work style bark paintings as well as in her hollow log paintings. From 2014 to 2015 she worked on a larrakitj installation, also titled Ganybu. In this work, the vertical and horizontal lines represent the fish trap in the shark songline. The diagonal lines represent the water, the source of the Djapu’ soul. Eucalyptus shavings were scattered on the floor of National Gallery of Victoria, where this work was displayed, to transport the audience to Wäṉḏawuy.

== Madayin ==
One of Marrnyula's infamous puzzle work paintings is a part of Madayin: Eight Decades of Aboriginal Australian Bark Painting from Yirrkala. This exhibit was organized by Kluge-Ruhe Aboriginal Art Collection of the University of Virginia in partnership with the Buku-Larrŋgay Mulka Centre. This exhibition was created to invite new audiences a look into the sacred and secret of Yirrkala. Organized by clan and songlines, this exhibit includes many songlines, including Mäṉa songline.

The Mäṉa is a songline that spans across many Dhuwa songlines. Marrnyula's piece, Djapu’ Clan Design, depicts the end of Mäṉa's journey at Wäṉḏawuy, Marrnyula's homeland. Here, the shark ancestor sees hunters from the Gupa-Djapu’ clan poisoning fish. The hunters attempted to trap Mäṉa with a woven fish trap but he swung his head and broke free. The force of this created a bend in the river.

Djapu’ Clan Design is a large piece made up of 299 smaller bark paintings. These smaller bark paintings make up a large grid, and each smaller painting depicts a grid design, calling back to the fish trap in the story. In this piece, the white clay designs represent freshwater and the black designs in the center represent muddy water created by the shark thrashing. The shark can be seen escaping near the top left of the puzzle work painting. The river from the songlines is a river at Waṉḏawuy that is painted on young boys for their initiation ceremonies and elderly men who are ready to retire. The grid designs in this artwork are her ceremonial designs. She uses cross-hatching to create a shimmering effect, mimicking the water.

'Living by the Sea' is a saltwater sea painting. The story revolves around two hunters (djambatj) getting ready to capture turtle eggs while others are fishing with spears (gara) and gathering sea crabs and bait to catch guya. The painting is all about the sea and the two moieties—Yirritja and Dhuwa.

== Awards ==
- 1994, Best Painting, Barunga Festival Art Awards.
- 2002, Honourable Mention, Michael Long Testimonial Art Award.
- 2020, Telstra Bark Painting Prize, 2020 National Aboriginal and Torres Strait Islander Art Awards

== Significant exhibitions ==
- 1994: 11th National Aboriginal and Torres Strait Islander Art Awards, Museum and Art Gallery of the Northern Territory, Darwin
- 1996: 13th National Aboriginal and Torres Strait Islander Art Awards, Museum and Art Gallery of the Northern Territory, Darwin
- 1997: 14th National Aboriginal and Torres Strait Islander Art Awards, Museum and Art Gallery of the Northern Territory, Darwin
- 1999-2001: Saltwater: Yirrkala Bark Paintings of Sea Country. Drill Hall Gallery, Australian National University, Canberra; John Curtin Gallery, Curtin University, Perth; Australian National Maritime Museum, Sydney; Museum of Modern Art Heide; Melbourne; Araluen Art Centre, Alice Springs.
- 2008: 25th National Aboriginal and Torres Strait Islander Art Awards, Museum and Art Gallery of the Northern Territory, Darwin
- 2009: Making it New: Focus on Contemporary Australian Art. Museum of Contemporary Art, Sydney.
- 2010: National Aboriginal and Torres Strait Islander Art Awards, Museum and Art Gallery of the Northern Territory, Darwin
- 2010 17th Biennale of Sydney — The Beauty of Distance, MCA, Sydney
- 2010 Djalkiri; We are standing on their names, Nomad Art, 24-Hour Art, Darwin Festival
- 2015: Ganybu. Gertrude Contemporary Art Spaces, Melbourne.
- 2016-17: Who's Afraid of Colour? National Gallery of Victoria, Melbourne
- 2019-2020: The Inside World: Contemporary Aboriginal Australian Memorial Poles. Nevada Museum of Art, Reno, NV; Charles H. Wright Museum of African American History, Detroit, MI; The Fralin Museum of Art, University of Virginia, Charlottesville, VA; Frost Art Museum, Florida International University, Miami, FL.
- 2019: Tarnanthi. Art Gallery of South Australia, Adelaide
- 2024: Madayin, The Fralin Museum of Art at the University of Virginia, Charlottesville, VA

== Collections ==
- Art Gallery of New South Wales
- Australian Museum
- Flinders University Art Museum
- National Gallery of Australia
- Museum and Art Galleries of the Northern Territory
- Kluge-Ruhe Aboriginal Art Collection of the University of Virginia
- National Maritime Museum
- Sydney Opera House
- National Museum of Australia
- University of Wollongong
- Singapore Art Gallery
- Toowoomba Regional Art Gallery
