= Memorial pole =

Hollow log coffin, now created as artworks, from northern Australia

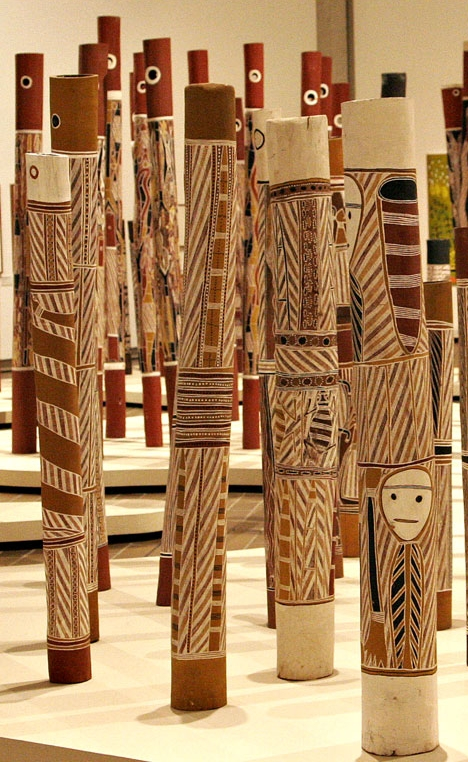
Memorial poles at the National Gallery of Australia

A memorial pole, also known as hollow log coffin, burial pole, lorrkkon, ḻarrakitj, or ḏupun, is a hollow tree trunk decorated with elaborate designs, made by the Yolngu and Bininj peoples of Arnhem Land in the Northern Territory of Australia. Originally used to hold the bones of deceased people or for burial ceremonies, they are now made as works of art. The permanent exhibit at the National Gallery of Australia, Aboriginal Memorial, consists of 200 hollow log coffins, created by 43 artists.

== Terminology ==
The poles are variously known as lorrkkon (in West Arnhem Land, Bininj Kunwok), ḻarrakitj (in the east), or ḏupun by the Yolngu people. The names derive from the name of the burial ceremony, also variously called djalumbu, badurru, mudukundja, mululu and larajeje.

English names include hollow log coffins, burial pole, and memorial pole.

== Description and uses ==
Hollow log coffins vary in size: those made for a burial ceremony are large, while smaller logs may hold the bones of a person (as ossuaries), to be kept by their family for some time. They can also represent the deceased person, with designs mirroring those painted on the body during the burial rites. Sometimes there is a small painted or carved hole near the top, provided to allow the deceased's soul to look out on the land. Traditionally, the log is that of the stringybark Eucalyptus tetrodonta which has been naturally hollowed out by termites.

The poles are painted with elaborate and intricate designs, which relate to the deceased's clan, and are believed to help guide the soul to its home, where spirits and ancestors would then recognise it. The designs relate to ancestral identity, and sometimes link groups connected to the same ancestral beings. The designs are filled in with cross-hatching, in a form known as rarrk. As works of art, they celebrate the ancestors and old cultural wisdom, as well as operating as a canvas for the designs of the artists. Burial ceremonies are associated with a celebration of life, and the designs represent identity and connection to Country.

Yolngu women were not allowed to paint sacred themes on larrakitj (or bark paintings) until 1970, but since then many women have taken up the practice.

Elders have supported the creation of memorial poles as artworks. The Buku-Larrnggay Mulka Art Centre (Buku) produces the poles to be sold internationally.

== Exhibits ==
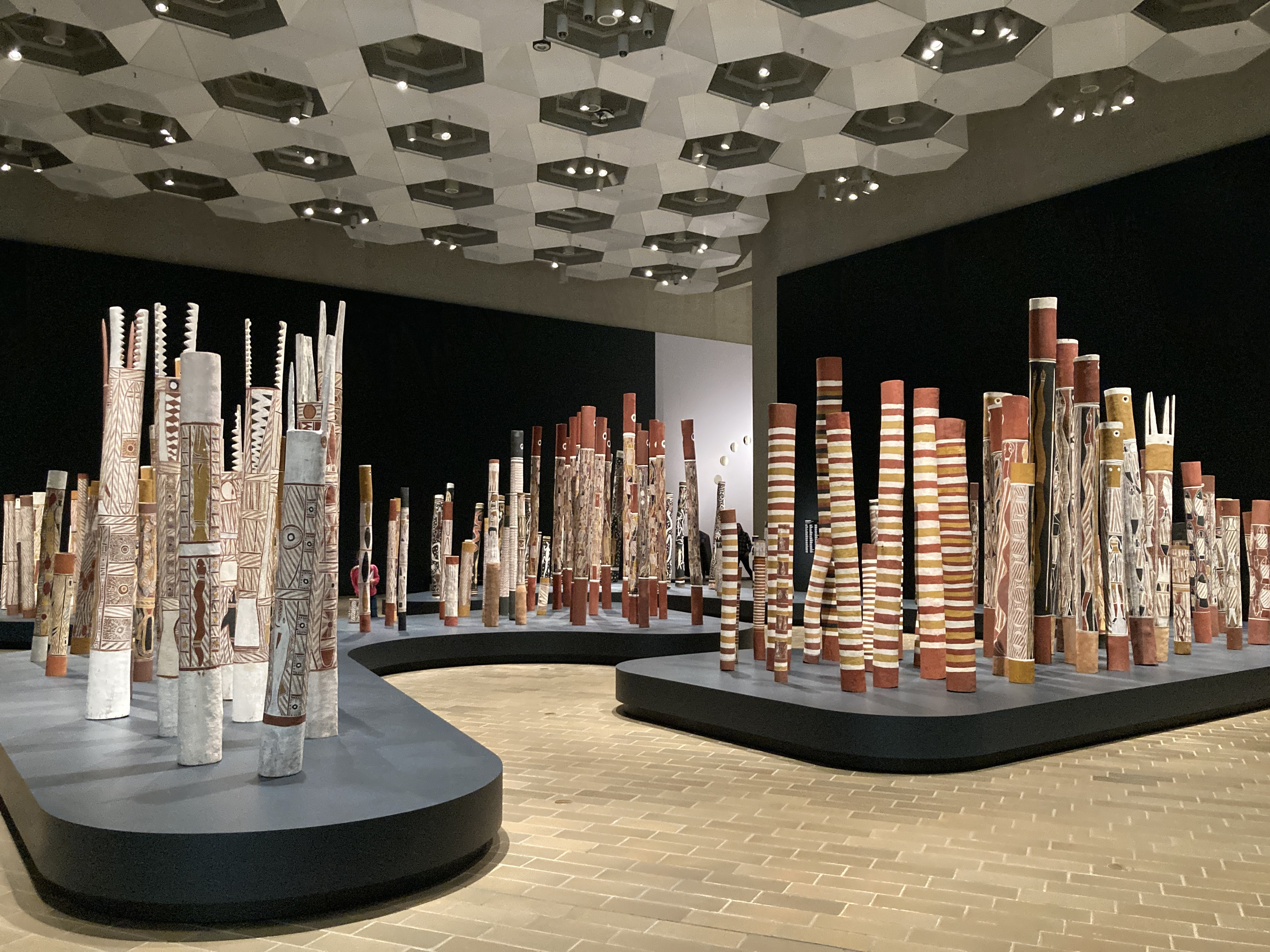
Aboriginal Memorial at the National Gallery of Australia

The poles are sometimes displayed as individual works of art, or grouped, usually according to the Yolngu clan, moiety and kinship rules.

The National Gallery of Australia in Canberra holds an installation originally created in 1988 called the Aboriginal Memorial, consisting of 200 hollow log coffins from Central Arnhem Land. It is intended to commemorate all of the Indigenous Australians who have died defending their land since the colonisation of Australia in 1788, and made for public display. There is a path through the installation, representing the course of the Glyde River estuary, flowing through the Arafura Swamp before reaching the sea. The exhibit, which was created by 43 artists from Ramingining, was moved to a prominent new location in the gallery in June 2022.

In 2014, the work of Wukun Wanambi, which focuses on larritj, was exhibited at the British Museum.

In 2020, The Fralin Museum of Art and the Kluge-Ruhe Aboriginal Art Collection co-presented an exhibition called Inside World: Contemporary Aboriginal Australian Memorial Poles at the Fralin, in Charlottesville, Virginia. The exhibition included the work of John Mawurndjul AM, Djambawa Marawili AM Gabriel Maralngurra and Joe Guymala. This exhibition increased demand for the poles in the art world.

There is a "forest" of larrakitj in the Elder Wing of the Art Gallery of South Australia in Adelaide, which includes works by Gulumbu Yunupingu and Nawurapu Wunungmurra. Larrakitj by Wunungmurra were shown in the Tarnanthi art festival in 2017–2018.

In May 2021, two burial poles were erected at the Australian National University in Canberra, to commemorate the return of over 200 blood samples to the Galiwin'ku people, taken without consent and returned 50 years later in 2019.

An exhibition of larrikitj, bark paintings and other works by a number of women artist at Buku, including sisters Nancy Gaymala Yunupingu, Gulumbu Yunupingu, Barrupu Yunupingu, Nyapanyapa Yunupingu, and Eunice Djerrkngu Yunupingu; Dhuwarrwarr Marika; Malaluba Gumana; Naminapu Maymuru-White; Nonggirrnga Marawili; and Dhambit Mununggurr; and Margaret Wirrpanda, were included in a December 2021 – April 2022 exhibition at the National Gallery of Victoria, called Bark Ladies: Eleven Artists from Yirrkala.

== See also ==
- Treetrunk coffin
