= Rerrkirrwanga Mununggurr =

Australian artist (born 1971)

Rerrkirrwanga Mununggurr is an Australian artist renowned for her finely detailed paintings on bark. In some publications Rerrkirrwanga is referred to as Rerrki, which appears to be a nickname from her older sister Marrnyula Mununggurr. She is the youngest daughter of the artist Djutjadjutja Munungurr. Her husband, Yalpi Yunupinu, helped train Rerrkirrwanga in the traditions that he painted in addition to what she learned from her father. In the 1990s, Rerrkirrwanga finished many of his works even though they are attributed to her father. She now has authority to paint her own stories and her large-scale works on bark are in Australian and international collections.

== Biography ==
Rerrkirrwanga Mununggurr was born in 1971 in Arnhem Land, Northern Territory, Australia, and her family is part of the Djapu clan of the Yolngu people. Her father Djutjadjutja Munungurr, older sister Marrnyula Mununggurr, and mother Nonggirrnga Marawili have all worked as artists within the Aboriginal community. She is married to Gumatj artist Yalpi Yunupingu.

Rerrkirrwanga was one of the first printmakers at Buku-Larrnggay Mulka Art Centre and she continues to be an active artist in the centre. The Buku-Larrnggay Mulka Art Center is located in Yirrkala, an Aboriginal community about 700 kilometers east of Darwin. This is the Indigenous community-controlled art centre of Northeast Arnhem Land.

In 2012 she held solo exhibition Rerrkirrwanga Munungurr & Nawarapu Wunungmurra: New Works at Annandale Galleries.

In 2014 she travelled to Santa Fe, New Mexico, USA for her solo exhibition at Chiaroscuro Gallery.

She attended group exhibitions: In 2018, she contributed to Oceanic: Land and Sea; Gods and Men at Annandale Galleries, Australia. In 2023, she participated in collective exhibition Artists of the North Country(Arnhem Land & Beyond) at Mitchell Fine Art.

== Screen Printing ==
Through her time as a screen printer at Buku-Larrnggay Mulka Art Center, many screen printers at the center worked with master printmaker Basil Hall, who has been working alongside Aboriginal artists since 1983 to facilitate production of screen prints and to integrate other mediums of art creation. Basil Hall assisted in the establishment of the art center in Yirrkala, who taught the interested artists how to utilize the printmaking equipment her brought. Rerrkirrwanga and her sister, Marrnyula Munungurr, created the first lino cut designs at the Art Center when screen printing first began there.

In 2015, she created an etching call Ganybu. Ganybu are a type of fishing net that her community produces that are double-sided and triangular. According to the Dreamtime stories that are told today, although the knowledge of these nets was acquired from two spirit men named Djirrawit and Nyåluŋ sometime in the past, these nets are still used today in some cases.

== Bark Paintings (nuwayak) ==
At the Buku-Larrnggay Mulka Art Centre, at the end of the wet season, Stringybark trees are stripped of their bark which is then wet, cured by fire, weighted, and left to dry. Ochres and earth pigments in red, yellow, black, and white are collected from known deposits.

Brushes are made with human hair tied to a stick. These brushes are called mawat, and Rerrkirrwanga’s are known to be among the finest, accounting for her meticulously detailed bark paintings. Rerrkirrwanga’s bark paintings are so finely detailed they can require weeks of careful concentration.

A unique aspect of her bark paintings is her ability to paint both Dhuwa and Yirritja miny'ti, or sacred symbols. Rerrki received authority from her husband Yälpi to paint his Yirritja miny'ti and she also has the authority to illustrate her own Dhuwa miny'ti.

On the dried barks, the artists paint sacred designs that belong to themselves or to their clans. They use meticulous layering of individual strokes to produce cross hatched patterns, each pattern belonging to a particular estate, clan, moiety, or place. Rerrkirrwanga often paints stories and patterns related to her husband’s clan Gumatj. The elders at Buku-Larrnggay Mulka Art Centre have resisted painting with acrylics on canvas or board and continue the use of natural pigments and sheets of bark.

== Awards ==
In 2009, Rerrkirrwanga won Best Bark Painting category in the National Aboriginal and Torres Strait Islander Art awards. The piece that won the award was named Gumatj Gurtha, which showed her husband’s clan designs of fire. The fire is called Gurtha and is pictorially represented as trails of diamond. The diamond design, represents the various states of fire; the red flames, the white smoke and ash, the black charcoal and the yellow dust. The totemic significance of fire to the Yunupiŋu family of the Gumatj is paramount.

In 2010, Rerrkirrwanga was a finalist for the TOGART NT Contemporary Art Award.

== Exhibitions ==
Since 1994 her art has appeared in more than 30 exhibitions across Australia, and in 2014 she had a solo exhibition in Santa Fe, New Mexico.

== Collections ==
Her works can be seen in the following public collections:

- Australian National Maritime Museum, Darling Harbour, Sydney, NSW
- Kluge-Ruhe Aboriginal Art Collection, University of Virginia, USA
- National Gallery of Australia, Canberra ACT
- National Gallery of Victoria, Melbourne.

Her work is also in many private collections in Australia and abroad.
