= Buku-Larrnggay Mulka Centre =

Indigenous Australian art centre at Yirrkala, Northern Territory

- Formation: 1976; 50 years ago
- Purpose: Work and gallery space for Indigenous Australian artists
- Location: Yirrkala, Northern Territory, Australia
- Coordinates: 12°15′01″S 136°53′29″E

The Buku-Larrnggay Mulka Centre, formerly Buku-Larrŋgay Arts and also known as the Buku-Larrnggay Mulka Art Centre and Museum, is an art centre in Yirrkala, Arnhem Land, in the Northern Territory of Australia. It is often referred to as Buku for short. It is one of many Indigenous art centres across Australia, which support their communities and make them self-reliant – an Australian invention. Many notable artists have worked or continue to work at the centre. The Mulka Project, housed within the centre, is a multimedia archive and production unit. The centre also has a stage, named after artist and Indigenous rights activist Roy Marika, which is used for the annual Yarrapay Festival.

== History ==
The art of the Yirrkala area has developed a growing market ever since the township was founded as a mission by the Methodist Overseas Mission in 1935, and started selling local artworks. Evidence suggests that Yirrkala art played a major role in the appreciation of Indigenous art by non-Indigenous people.

The inspiration for the gallery arose in the 1960s, when Narritjin Maymuru set up his own gallery on the beachfront.

In 1976 Buku-Larrŋgay Arts was established by local artists in the old Yirrkala Mission health centre, after missionaries had left and as the Aboriginal land rights and Homeland movements gathered pace. A new museum was built in 1988 using a Bicentenary grant, and this now contains a collection created in the 1970s which illustrates clan law. It also houses the message sticks which, after delivery by the anthropologist Donald Thomson, were instrumental in establishing peaceful talks during the Caledon Bay crisis in 1935.

Naminapu Maymuru-White was curator from 1990 until 1996. From 1998 Buku-Larrnggay has been supported by the Australian Government's Indigenous Visual Arts Industry Support programme.

In 1996, extra gallery spaces and a screen print studio were built, and in 2007, The Mulka Project was added. This project comprises a collection of many thousands of historical images and films, and continues to create new digital art and images.

In 2015 the centre represented more than 300 artists from around the homelands, and exhibitions of work by the artists were being shown across Australia and internationally.

In September 2019, a new air-conditioned workshop, as well as a larger covered outdoor space, was constructed. During excavation works for the new building, a new source of highly-prized white ochre, used by many artists, was found 2 m (6 ft 7 in) below ground when refurbishing the building.

== Description ==
The Buku-Larrnggay Mulka Centre, formerly Buku-Larrŋgay Arts and also known as the Buku-Larrnggay Mulka Art Centre and Museum, is a art centre in Yirrkala. It is often referred to as Buku for short. Yirrkala is around 18 km (11 mi) south of the town of Nhulunbuy.

The Buku-Larrnggay Mulka Centre is one of many Indigenous art centres across Australia, which support their communities and make them self-reliant. This type of centre is, according to art coordinator Will Stubbs, an Australian invention. As of 2024, Buku-Larrnggay continues to be supported by the Commonwealth Government's Indigenous Visual Arts Industry Support programme.

As of 2020, the centre, greatly expanded, comprises two divisions: the Yirrkala Art Centre, which represents the artists exhibiting and selling contemporary art, and The Mulka Project, which incorporates the museum. It is known for its production of bark paintings, weaving in natural fibres, larrakitj (memorial poles), yidaki, and many other forms of art.

There is a hallway, dubbed the "hall of fame" by Stubbs, in which are displayed the many awards won by artists at the centre, including several National Aboriginal & Torres Strait Islander Art Awards (NATSIAA) and Wynne Prizes won by Nyapanyapa Yunupiŋu in 2021, and by her sister Djakaŋu Yunupiŋu in 2024.

There is a stage called the Roy Marika Stage at the centre, which is used for the annual Yarrapay Festival. In June 2021, the festival was directed by Witiyana Marika, and featured the Andrew Gurruwiwi Band, Yothu Yindi, Yirrmal, and East Journey.

== The Mulka Project ==
The Mulka Project, established in 2007 to build a digital archive of images and video from Yolŋu history, is headed by creative director Ishmael Marika. Today, it also produces multimedia installations for exhibition. The word mulka means "a sacred but public ceremony", as well as "to hold or protect".

The Mulka Project comprises film and music production facilities, a recording studio, a teaching centre, and a cultural archive, which are all managed under Yolŋu law and governance. It aims to train and employ Yolŋu people of all ages in the production of various audio-visual media, with the range of roles including cultural advisors, filmmakers, translators, camera operators, film editors, artists, and scholars. This creates income that flows into homeland (outstation) communities. Deaf artist Gutiŋarra Yunupiŋu, who joined The Mulka Project in 2015, features in a video demonstrating Yolŋu Sign Language, which was broadcast in the large 2025 exhibition at the Art Gallery of New South Wales.

The cultural resources created in the centre are distributed among the wider community, and the archive of Yolŋu knowledge, ceremony, and cultural history, including dance, song, and words from long ago, continues to grow.

Ishmael Marika was appointed creative director of the Mulka Project in 2010, and continues in the role as of December 2025. Joseph Brady has been the program and technical director of since 2012. Dhukumul Wanambi, daughter of artist Wukuṉ Waṉambi, who started studying law before the death of her father in 2022, is a cultural director of The Mulka Project. Her sister, Gaypalani, is also an artist at the centre.

== Holdings ==
The historic Yirrkala Church Panels were created in 1963 by Yolngu elders of the Dhuwa moiety (including Mawalan Marika, Wandjuk Marika and Mithinarri Gurruwiwi), who painted one sheet with their major ancestral narratives and clan designs, and eight elders of the Yirritja moiety, including Mungurrawuy Yunupingu, Birrikitji Gumana, and Narritjin Maymuru, who painted the other sheet with Yirritja designs. They were discarded by the church in 1974, but were salvaged by Buku-Larrnggay in 1978. On 27 February 1998 they were unveiled by then prime minister John Howard, and were described by Yolŋu leaders as "Title Deeds which establish the legal tenure for each of our traditional clan estates".

== Artists ==
Women artists who have worked at the centre include five sisters: Nancy Gaymala Yunupingu, Gulumbu Yunupingu, Barrupu Yunupingu, Nyapanyapa Yunupingu, and Eunice Djerrkngu Yunupingu; as well as Dhuwarrwarr Marika; Malaluba Gumana; Naminapu Maymuru-White; Nonggirrnga Marawili; Dhambit Mununggurr, and Mulkuṉ Wirrpanda. Their work was included in a December 2021 – April 2022 exhibition at the NGV, called Bark Ladies: Eleven Artists from Yirrkala.

Other notable artists at the centre, past and present, include Banduk Marika, Gunybi Ganambarr, Djambawa Marawili, and Yanggarriny Wunungmurra.

As of 2025, the artists working at the centre include Dhukumul and Gaypalani Wanambi, daughters of Wukuṉ Waṉambi; Wurrandan Marawili; Naminapu Maymuru-White (known as "Nami", and grandmother of Ngalakan Billy Waṉambi, lead singer of the band King Stingray); Dhalmula #2 Burarrwaŋa; Munuy’ŋu Marika (who oversees the print studio, and is married to King Stingray yidaki player, Dimathaya Burarrwaŋa); Djunmili Yunupingu; and Gutiŋarra Yunupiŋu.

== Exhibitions ==
Maḏayin: Eight Decades of Aboriginal Australian Bark Painting from Yirrkala is an exhibition mounted by the centre in collaboration with the Kluge-Ruhe Aboriginal Art Collection of the University of Virginia in 2024. Inspired by Djambawa Marawili and seven years in the making, it was the first major exhibition of bark painting to tour the United States. It was curated entirely by Yolŋu artists and knowledge holders from Buku-Larrŋgay Mulka, and was exhibited around the country from 4 February 2024 to 5 January 2025. Maḏayin is a Yolŋu term meaning "sacred" and "hidden". This was a comprehensive intercultural project, accompanied by a bilingual 350-page catalogue which included essays by and interviews with the major artists.

The Buku-Larrŋgay Mulka Centre has a long history of collaboration with the Art Gallery of New South Wales, which presented its Yirrkala drawings exhibition in 2013 and Noŋgirrŋa Marawili: from my heart and mind in 2018. A new exhibition featuring artists from the centre, curated by Cara Pinchbeck and titled Yolŋu Power: The Art of Yirrkala was mounted in a new gallery in the Naala Badu building at the AGNSW, from 21 June to 6 October 2025. The exhibition included two multimedia installations from The Mulka Project.

== Collections ==
The National Gallery of Victoria in Melbourne has been collecting bark paintings by Buku artists since around 2000, which are included in its significant collection of work by Yolŋu women artists.

== See also ==
- Yirrkala bark petitions
