= Will Stubbs =

Australian art curator of Indigenous Australian art

Will Stubbs is an Australian art curator. He has been coordinator of the Indigenous Australian art centre Buku-Larrnggay Mulka Centre in Yirrkala, Arnhem Land, in the Northern Territory of Australia, since 2001.

== Early career ==
Stubbs worked as a criminal defence lawyer in Sydney and then in the Top End for ten years.

After moving to Yirrkala in the early 1990s, he worked for Aboriginal legal aid for several years.

== Career in art ==
Stubbs became passionate about Indigenous Australian art, and started working with Yolŋu elders and artists, such as Gawirrin Gumana, Djambawa Marawili, Gulumbu Yunupingu, and Wanyubi Marika in 1995.

In 1995 he started working at the Buku-Larrnggay Mulka Centre, an art centre in Yirrkala where many notable Yolgnu artists created and exhibit their work. In 2001, he assumed the role of coordinator of the centre, taking over from his former colleague there, Andrew Blake. In 2007 he launched a digital archive and film-making studio called The Mulka Project. Over the period of around 15 years, he doubled the size of the art centre. His promotion of Yolngu art has led to many Australian and international exhibitions, including at the Musée du quai Branly in Paris in 2006.

Stubbs has actively encouraged many artists at the centre, including Nyapanyapa Yunupingu and Garawan Wanambi.

Stubbs has written several articles about artists and Yolgnu art, including for Artlink magazine. and Artist Profile.

He has written or contributed to catalogues accompanying major exhibitions, such as Yolŋu power: the art of Yirrkala at the Art Gallery of New South Wales, which ran from 21 June to 6 October 2025.

== Recognition and awards ==
In March 2015, Stubbs was presented with the inaugural Australia Council's Visual Arts Award (Advocate) in Sydney, which recognises his "outstanding success as the long-term co-ordinator of the Buku-Larrnggay Mulka Centre in Yirrkala and his passionate advocacy of Indigenous arts and Australia's unique arts centres".

He is regarded as an expert in Yolgnu art, and asked for input in forums and for publication. In February 2019 he joined a panel discussion at the Nevada Museum of Art, which included two artists from Gunybi Ganambarr and Barayuwa Mununggurr along with Henry Skerritt, Curator of Indigenous Arts of Australia at the Kluge-Ruhe Aboriginal Art Collection of the University of Virginia. The discussion, titled The Inside World: Contemporary Aboriginal Australian Memorial Poles accompanied an exhibition of memorial poles from Arnhem Land.

== Personal life ==
In 1994 Stubbs married school principal, scholar, artist, and musician, Merrkiyawuy Ganambarr (now known as Merrkiyawuy Ganambarr-Stubbs Includes photo of Merrkiyawuy Ganambarr-Stubbs.) whom he met when working for Aboriginal legal aid. They have a daughter, Siena.

Siena Ganambarr Stubbs started taking photographs from a young age, and in 2018 published a book of her photographs of birds of North-east Arnhem Land, called Our Birds. The book was shortlisted in the 2019 CBCA Book of the Year Awards: Eve Pownall Award for Information Books and the 2020 Chief Ministers NT Book Awards for Young Adult/Children. After finishing school, at the age of 18 she worked on The Mulka Project at the art centre. In 2020, she wrote an article for NGV Magazine, later published on the NGV website, about the effects of climate change on Yolngu Country. She moved to Brisbane to study at the Queensland University of Technology, graduating with a Bachelor of Fine Arts (Film, Screen and New Media) in 2023.
