= Nancy Gaymala Yunupingu =

Aboriginal Australian artist (c. 1935-2005)

- Born: c.1935 Northern Territory
- Died: 2005
- Occupation: Artist
- Parents: Mungurrawuy Yunupingu (father); Bakili (mother)

Nancy Gaymala Yunupingu (c.1935–2005; also rendered Yunupiŋu) was a senior Yolngu artist and matriarch, who lived in Arnhem Land in the Northern Territory, Australia. She worked at the Buku-Larrnggay Mulka Centre in Yirrkala, where her work is still held, and is known for her graphic art style, bark paintings, and printmaking.

== Life and family ==
Nancy Gaymala Yunupingu was born around 1935, the daughter of Mungurrawuy Yunupingu. Her mother, Bakili, was an artist and elder of the Galpu clan. Two of her brothers were musician Galarrwuy and land rights campaigner Mandawuy Yunupingu. Her sisters included artists Gulumbu Yunupingu, Barrupu Yunupingu, Nyapanyapa Yunupingu, and Eunice Djerrkngu Yunupingu(c.1945–2022), among others.

Gaymala's moiety was Yirritja and her clans Gumatj and Rrakpala. Her homeland was Biranybirany.

She died in 2005.

== Artistic practice ==
Yunupingu's strength was in graphic arts, but she also did bark paintings with ochre, wove, created wooden carvings, and employed the printmaking techniques of etching and screenprinting. She began her painting career in the 1980s, working on both bark and canvas.

The Wan'kurra, or golden bandicoot, which features prominently in song-cycles in Gumatj ceremonies, was a common motif in her work, often running through scrubland. The Gumatj designs and stories featured in her work were taught to her by her father.

== Works, exhibitions and recognition ==
- 1992 and 1995: two solo exhibitions at the Australian Girls Own Gallery (aGOG) in Canberra
- 1995: artist-in-residence at the Faculty of Creative Arts at Wollongong University, and created a series of linocut prints there
- 1997: work selected for entry in the Fremantle Print Awards in Western Australia
- 1999: commissioned by Nabalco to produce a picture for a Christmas card
- 1999: commissioned to paint large murals for the Aboriginal Hostel at Nhulunbuy, the Gove Industrial Supplies building, and for the children's ward at Nhulunbuy Hospital
- 1999: together with her sister Gulumbu, and Dhuwarrwarr Marika, she was engaged to paint a large film set for the film Yolngu Boy, which were copies of the famous Yirrkala Church Panels created in 1963 by Yolngu elders
- 2001: Vital Fluids, a multi-artist exhibition also including the work of England Bangala, Banduk Marika, Judy Watson, Naminapu Maymuru-White, Robin White, and Barrupu Yunupingu, at the Helen Maxwell Gallery
- 2003: Groundswell: An exhibition of Aboriginal art, a multi-artist exhibition at the Helen Maxwell Gallery
- December 2021 – April 2022: Bark Ladies: Eleven Artists from Yirrkala, an exhibition from the Buku-Larrnggay Mulka Centre in Yirrkala, held at the National Gallery of Victoria, also featuring the work of Noŋgirrŋa Marawili, Gulumbu Yunupiŋu, Barrupu Yunupiŋu, Dhambit Munuŋgurr, Marrnyula Munuŋgurr, Mulkun Wirrpanda, Naminapu Maymuru-White, and others, including bark paintings and larrakitj (burial poles)

== Collections ==
The National Gallery of Victoria holds Bäru story (1990), painted with earth pigments on the bark of stringybark.

Her work is also held in major collections around Australia, including:

- National Museum of Australia (Aboriginal Arts Board Collection), Canberra
- National Gallery of Australia, Canberra
- National Maritime Museum, Sydney
- Museums Victoria, Melbourne
- Museum and Art Gallery of the Northern Territory, Darwin
- Charles Darwin University, CDU Art Collection, which holds two etchings and four screenprints
