= Nyapanyapa Yunupingu =

Australian painter (1945–2021)

- Born: c. 1945; Yirrkala, Northern Territory, Australia
- Died: 20 October 2021 (aged 75–76); Yirrkala, Northern Territory, Australia
- Occupation: Contemporary artist
- Known for: Painting, contemporary Indigenous Australian art
- Spouse: Djiriny Mununggurr
- Parent: Mungurrawuy Yunupingu (father)
- Relatives: Gulumbu Yunupingu (sister) Galarrwuy Yunupingu (brother) Mandawuy Yunupingu (brother) Barrupu Yunupingu (sister) Dhopiya Yunupingu (sister) Djakangu Yunupingu (sister)
- Awards: 2021 Wynne Prize

Nyapanyapa Yunupingu (c. 1945 – 20 October 2021) was an Australian Yolngu painter and printmaker who lived and worked in the community at Yirrkala, Arnhem Land, in the Northern Territory. Yunupingu created works of art that drastically diverge from the customs of the Yolngu people and made waves within the art world as a result. Her work is renowned for its continuously evolving style, increasing in complexity and often, scale, over time. Due to this departure from tradition within her oeuvre, Yunupingu's work had varying receptions from within her community and the broader art world.

== Early life ==
Yunupingu was a Yolŋu woman of the Gumatj clan and was born in Arnhem Land, Northern Territory, in 1945. She was the daughter of Yolŋu artist and cultural leader Munggurrawuy Yunupingu (c.1905–1979), who was involved with the Yirrkala bark petitions. Yunupingu's father taught her and her siblings how to paint, allowing her to watch as he created various traditional works. In a conversation between Nyapanyapa Yunupingu and Will Stubbs, Yunupingu discussed how her father taught her to paint. He told her:

Daughter, see this, you will do this in the future.

Nyapanyapa also stated of her generational painting inspiration in another instance:

My father Mungurrawuy Yunupingu taught me how to paint. I learnt from watching him. He was always working. He said to me, 'When I am gone you will follow behind me and paint too. Show the people---paint and work.'

Widowed, she was a wife of Djapu clan leader Djiriny Mununggurr, who died in 1977. She was the sister of brothers Galarrwuy Yunupingu and Mandawuy Yunupingu, and artist sisters Gulumbu Yunupingu, Barrupu Yunupingu, Nancy Gaymala Yunupingu, and Eunice Djerrkngu Yunupingu(c.1945–2022), among others.

Nyapanyapa Yunupingu grew up working on the mission with her sisters, herding dairy cattle and goats. She learned to paint by watching her father's painting process, although he did not officially pass on Miny'tji designs to her.

== Art career ==
Yunupingu worked through the Buku-Larrnggay Mulka Centre at Yirrkala. Here, she developed a close relationship with Will Stubbs, the art coordinator at Buku-Larrnggay Mulka Centre at Yirrkala. He helped to push her creatively and encourage her art. Stubbs said of Yunupingu and her art:

Nyapanyapa's best form of communication is her art. This is because she is deaf, doesn't speak English, is otherwise not that verbal, doesn't belong to a culture which believes it is necessary to talk at length about art unless in regard to its sacred character, doesn't paint sacred art, does not have a sense of herself as an individual as distinct from her kinship group, does not have a sense of herself as an important artist, and does not have an interest in talking about herself.

=== Early career in painting ===
Prior to gaining international fame, Yunupingu grew up watching her artist father, Munggurrawuy Yunupingu, who encouraged her to make art after his death. With this support, Yunupingu joined her sisters [Barrupu Yunupingu] and [Gulumbu Yunupingu] at the Buku-Larrngay Mulka Art Center in Yirrkala where she first began practicing her printmaking. She first began working in the screen printing medium at the Art Center. These early works were defined by her once-figurative style, in 2007-2008, the focus of her work shifted and she gained late-blooming acclaim.

Yunupingu began painting at The Yirrkala Printspace, working daily in the centre's outdoor courtyard. Her presence eventually attracted a group of artists to join her (referred to as the "Courtyard Ladies") which included her sisters Barrupu Yunupingu and Gulumbu Yunupingu, as well as Nongirrna Marawili, Mulkun Wirrpanda, and Dhuwarrwarr Marika. Yunupingu was a part of a movement at Yirrkala towards secularism in their art with this group. Yunupingu made screen prints at first, focusing on a figurative visual style. Yunupingu's early work dealt with personal stories and experiences, creating narratives that were not inspired by ancestral stories or dreamings but rather by her own life and her family history. Her work met with much success with her breakout painting Incident at Mutpi 1975, 2008, which featured a depiction of her being mauled by a buffalo. The Mulka Project created a film to go along with the piece and the painting and film won the 2008 Wandjuk Marika Memorial 3D Award. Yunupingu was inspired to create this work by Will Stubbs, who presented her with a large bark before the creation of Incident at Mutpi 1975.

=== Mayilimiriw ("meaningless") paintings ===
Yunupingu's mayilimiriw paintings derive their name from the Yolngu Matha word that translates as “meaningless." These works are made from white ochre pigment dug from local grounds and rely on a densely layered technique to fill the entirety of the bark surfaces they’re painted upon. As such, these works are characterized by their loosely interwoven networks of cross-hatching and diverse directionality, supplying them with a dynamic, highly textural effect. Although her works maintain a recognizably Yolngu materiality, this non-narrative approach breaks from traditional Yolngu frameworks. Traditionally, most Yolngu art was based on a system of restricted knowledge and a means of communicating the ancestral and spiritual worlds. Yunupingu, however, departs from this expectation of meaning entirely.

In 2009, after a dream in which the buffalo that had mauled Yunupingu in 1975 appeared to her, she vowed to never again paint a depiction of the traumatic event. She began instead for a period to create paintings that were devoid of figurative images. Rather, they focused on layering coloured cross-hatching, creating an artistic style that centred around the nature of creation in the moment. Nyapanyapa's abstraction in her mayilimiriw paintings may not seem to mean anything, but she was a highly ceremonial person and this work can still be tied to ideas of country and ancestral tradition.

==== White paintings ====
Yunupingu's "white paintings" take this concept of mayilimiriw further. Produced from 2009–2010, this series of paintings are solely focused on rhythmic mark-making, excluding colour from the narrative and instead creating works that were uninhibited in their spontaneous nature. Rather than being a premeditated image, Yunupingu's resulting work was fully dependent on the moment, the texture and stroke varying depending on material factors such as the brush and paint she was using. Examples from this series of works include Mapu, 2012, and Untitled, 2013, which showcase her minimalistic style through their use of simplified figuration upon a background of thinly hand-drawn lines in white-pipe clay.

==== Light Painting ====
When the art centre ran out of bark one wet season, Buku-Larrnggay coordinator Will Stubbs gave her some acetate paints and a paint pen, which had been used in an animation project. He noticed a "filigree complexity, of abstract existence" that he had not seen in her work before, and contacted a digital expert from Melbourne, Joseph Brady, to created random permutations and sequences in a looped silent digital file. The result, Light Painting, was installed in the 2012 Sydney Biennale.

=== Yunupingu's paintings ===
Whilst most of her work falls into the category of mayilimiriw, Yunupingu has created newer works which do contain figurative references. Specifically, she has included Ganyu (stars), which refer to the story of the seven sisters. Nyapanyapa created "The Seven Sisters Collaboration" with her seven sisters in 2012. This collection contained prints from each sister, which when brought together in a constellation form "The Seven Sisters Collaboration." The prints all emphasize each sister's individual style, while also coming together under a common theme.

=== Process and materials ===
Yunupingu's practice was one solely performed for her own satisfaction, perhaps hinting at her works independence from tradition and Dreaming narratives in favor of reflections of historical and contemporary events and activities. Yunupingu did not draft or plot her paintings, instead she relied on spontaneity and texture to create her works.Throughout her career as an artist she transitioned from creating razor-incised carvings of animals and spirits, to linocut prints, to bark paintings, and finally multimedia projections. These works display her range of materials, more often natural ones, although occasionally modern ones are present. She worked in ochre, ink, clay, acrylic, or pen on bark, wood, and even occasionally on paper. Her color palette was often minimalistic, although it did depart occasionally from typical, traditional Aboriginal color schemes, using pink and blue.

Within her mayilimiriw paintings, Yunupingu created a structure to work from by adding in circles, lines, and shapes which she then surrounded with crosshatching, using red, pink, and white earth pigments.

=== Notable career moments ===
- She had her first solo exhibition of bark paintings in 2008 at Sydney's Roslyn Oxley9 Gallery. Her work has been exhibited at the Biennale of Sydney in 2012 and 2016. Her 2016 exhibition at the Biennale of Sydney contained her larrakitj memorial poles, notable for their non-sacred decoration.
- In 2008, Yunupingu won the Wandjuk Marika Memorial 3D Prize at the National Aboriginal & Torres Strait Islander Art Awards with a piece that combined painting on eucalyptus bark with video to narrate a biographic event in which she was gored by a buffalo in 1975. Her paintings of being gored by a buffalo were the inspiration and backdrop for Nyapanyapa, a dance choreographed by Stephen Page for Bangarra Dance Theatre which toured the United States.
- In 2017, her abstract painting Lines was awarded the bark painting prize at the National Aboriginal & Torres Strait Islander Art Awards. The work was subsequently acquired by the Museum and Art Gallery of the Northern Territory (MAGNT), in Darwin.
- Yunupingu's exhibitions at Roslyn Oxley9 Gallery in 2008 and in the Tarnanthi Festival at the Art Gallery of South Australia contained her large wall works. Marking the Infinite was the centrepiece, made up of 45 individual papers reused from discarded print proofs taken from the Yirrkala Print Space. This marks, doubly, the "found" movement of Yirrkala artists as well as what initiated Aboriginal artists permission and foray into using non-natural mediums. These paper paintings and drawings by Yunupingu were the first works on paper to have ever been sold at Buku-Larrnggay.
- She was selected as one of the featured artists for the 2020 Australia-wide Know My Name initiative of the National Gallery of Australia.
- Starting on 23 May 2020 (later than scheduled owing to the COVID-19 pandemic in Australia) and running until 25 October 2020, a comprehensive solo exhibition of Yunupingu's work, the moment eternal: Nyapanyapa Yunupiŋu, was mounted at the Museum and Art Gallery of the Northern Territory. The exhibition featured more than 60 works, and was the first solo exhibition at MAGNT to feature work by an Aboriginal Australian artist. A catalogue to accompany the exhibition was published.
- In 2021, Yunupingu won the Wynne Prize for Garak – Night Sky, and the National Gallery of Australia purchased two of her works for inclusion in Part Two of the Know My Name: Australian Women Artists 1900 to Now exhibition. Yunupingu died in Yirrkala on 20 October 2021.
- Yunupingu's work, alongside ten other Yolngu women artist's works, appeared in the "Bark Ladies" exhibition in 2021. Each artist was chosen for their roles at Buku-Larrŋgay Mulka Centre and for how their art worked to challenge preconceptions of both modern and Indigenous art in Australia.
- In 2022, Yunupingu's work was displayed in the Madayin exhibition. This exhibition traveled to various cities at museums across the United States, continuing to 2025.

== Reception of art ==
While Yunupingu's art has received many accolades and has seen success internationally, there is a certain level of puzzlement over her success within her own community. Her paintings diverge from tradition and do not depict the traditional stories and dreamings of her people, nor their Minytji designs, thus they are seen by those within the culture as having "no power" and as something that is communicating purely with the Western art market rather than the Yolngu people. Despite this hesitancy within her own community, Yunupingu was trailblazing a new approach to art within her culture, creating a style and approach that is strictly her own. The criticism Yunupingu has faced about her "meaningless" paintings is relative, and some understand how she is an artist who is always tying her art back to ideas of country.

== Collections ==
- Art Gallery of New South Wales
- Kluge-Ruhe Aboriginal Art Collection of the University of Virginia
- National Gallery of Australia
- National Gallery of Victoria
- Queensland Art Gallery | Gallery of Modern Art
- Charles Darwin University Collection
- Art Gallery of Western Australia
- Auckland Art Gallery Toi O Tāmaki
- Fondation Opale, Lens, Switzerland
- Monash University Art Collection
- Museum of New Zealand, Te Papa Tongarewa
- Museum and Art Gallery of the Northern Territory

== Significant exhibitions ==
- 2008: Once Upon A Time. Roslyn Oxley9 Gallery, Sydney.
- 2008: Nyapanyapa – Bark Paintings, Prints and Carvings. Nomad Art Productions, Darwin.
- 2010: In Sydney Again. Roslyn Oxley9 Gallery, Sydney.
- 2011: Birrka'. Roslyn Oxley9 Gallery, Sydney.
- 2012: New Work, Roslyn Oxley9 Gallery, Sydney.
- 2012–13: UnDisclosed: 2nd National Indigenous Art Triennial. National Gallery of Australia, Canberra, ACT; Cairns Regional Gallery, Cairns QLD; Anne & Gordon Samstag Museum of Art, at the University of South Australia, Adelaide SA; and the Western Plains Cultural Centre, Dubbo, NSW.
- 2012: Crossing Cultures: The Owen and Wagner Collection of Contemporary Aboriginal Australian Art at the Hood Museum of Art. Hood Museum of Art, Dartmouth College, Hanover, NH.
- 2014: The World is Not a Foreign Land. Ian Potter Museum of Art, University of Melbourne, Melbourne, VIC.
- 2014: My Sister's Ceremony. Roslyn Oxley9 Gallery, Sydney.
- 2015: Lawarra Maypa. Roslyn Oxley9 Gallery, Sydney.
- 2015: Nyapanyapa Yunupingu. Art Gallery of South Australia, Adelaide.
- 2016: Nyapanyapa Yunupingu. Roslyn Oxley9 Gallery, Sydney.
- 2016–2019: Marking the Infinite: Contemporary Women Artists from Aboriginal Australia. Newcomb Art Museum, Tulane University, New Orleans, LA; Frost Art Museum, Florida International University, Miami, FL; Nevada Museum of Art, Reno, NV; The Phillips Collection, Washington, DC; and the Museum of Anthropology, University of British Columbia, Vancouver, BC, Canada.
- 2017: Nyapanyapa Yunupingu. Roslyn Oxley9 Gallery, Sydney.
- 2019: Ganyu. Roslyn Oxley9 Gallery, Sydney.
- 2020: 20/20: Shared Visions, Artbank, Sydney.
- 2020: the moment eternal: Nyapanyapa Yunipingu. Museum and Art Gallery of the Northern Territory, Darwin
- 2021: The Little Things. Roslyn Oxley9 Gallery, Sydney.
- 2022-2025: Maḏayin, Kluge-Ruhe Aboriginal Art Collection, Charlottesville, United States.

== Awards ==
- 2008: 3D Award, 25th Telstra National Aboriginal and Torres Strait Islander Art Award
- 2017: Bark Painting Award, 34th Telstra National Aboriginal and Torres Strait Islander Art Award
- 2021: Wynne Prize for Garak – night sky

== Death ==
Yunupingu died on 20 October 2021 in Yirrkala, Northern Territory, Australia.
