= Australian Aboriginal avoidance practices =

Requirement to avoid specific people

Aboriginal avoidance practices are a cultural practice in many traditional Aboriginal societies in which certain people are required to avoid others in their family or clan. These customs are still active in many parts of Australia, to varying extents, as a mark of respect. There are also protocols for averting eye contact and not speaking the names of the dead.

== Relationships ==
In general, across most language groups, the three most common avoidance relationships are:

=== Son/daughter-in-law and mother-in-law ===
In what is the strongest kinship avoidance rule, some Australian Aboriginal customs ban a person from talking directly to their mother-in-law or even seeing her. A mother-in-law also eats apart from her son-in-law or daughter-in-law and their spouse. If the two are present at the same ceremony, they will sit with their backs to each other but they can still communicate via the wife/husband, who remains the main conduit for communication in this relationship. Often there are language customs surrounding these relationships.

This relationship extends to avoiding all women of the same skin group as the mother-in-law, and, for the mother-in-law, men of the same skin group as the son-in-law. The age of marriage is very different for men and women with girls usually marrying at puberty while a man may not marry until his late 20s or even later. As mothers-in-law and sons-in-law are likely to be of approximately the same age the avoidance practice possibly serves to circumvent potential illicit relationships. It has also been suggested that the custom developed to overcome a common cause of friction in families.

=== Brother–sister ===
This usually takes place after initiation. Prior to this, brothers and sisters play together freely.

Both these avoidance relationships have their grounding in the Australian Aboriginal kinship system, and so are ways of avoiding incest in small bands of closely related people.

There are many other avoidance relationships, including same-sex relationships, but these are the main two.

=== Sexual ===
Once children are older, they are viewed as potential marital partners and their sexual behaviour becomes one of strict avoidance until married. Permanent relationships are prescribed by traditional law and often arranged before birth.

Same-sex relationships are viewed in the same light as other crimes against community, such as incestuous, interracial or unarranged relationships, and carry the same penalties. Intimate bodily contact between women regardless of marital status is not considered sexually suggestive but affirmation of friendship and a right to touch. Touch is particularly important when women tell jokes or discuss matters of a sexual nature. In these circumstances behaviours such as nipple tweaking and groin grabbing are seen as signs of friendship.

== Naming the dead ==
Traditionally, this meant avoiding referring to a dead person by name directly after their death as a mark of respect – and also because it is considered too painful for the grieving family. Today, the practice continues in many communities, who have also come to avoid sharing electronic impressions of the person. Most television stations use a disclaimer warning Aboriginal and Torres Strait Islander viewers that the program may contain images and voices of dead Indigenous people (as recommended by the Australian Broadcasting Corporation).

The avoidance period may last one or more years. The person can still be referred to in a roundabout way, such as, "that old lady", or by their generic skin name, but not by first name. In some Central Australian communities, if a girl named Alice (for example) dies, "Alice" must be avoided in all contexts, so a township like Alice Springs would be referred to indirectly. Those living with the same name as one of the dead are called a substitute name during the avoidance period, such as "Kuminjay", used in the Pintupi-Luritja dialect, or "Galyardu", which appears in a mid-western Australia Wajarri dictionary for this purpose.

This presents some challenges to indigenous people. In traditional society, people lived together in small bands of extended family, and name duplication was less common. Today, as people have moved into larger communities (with 300 to 600 people), the logistics of name avoidance have become increasingly difficult. Exotic and rare names have therefore become more common, particularly in Central Australia and desert communities, to deal with this new challenge.

== See also ==
- Australian Aboriginal culture
- Australian Aboriginal kinship systems
- Australian Aboriginal sign languages
- Avoidance speech
- Taboo on the dead § Taboo against naming the dead
