= Noongar kin systems =

In the tribal law of the Noongar, an Aboriginal Australian people, a kinship classification system determined descent and inheritance, and enforced restrictions on intermarriage between certain groups.

== Types ==
Western Australia: An atlas of human endeavour divides the Noongar classification systems into four types:

=== Perth ===
- Matrilineal moieties and matrilineal clans
- Includes Amangu, Yued, Wadjuk, Pinjareb, Wilmen, Ganeang, and Wardandi.

These groups were split between the (White Cockatoo) Manitjmat and (Australian Raven) Wardungmat moieties; children were born into the mother's moiety. Both groups are exogamous.

=== Bibelmen ===
- Patrilineal moieties and patrilineal local descent groups
- Includes Bibelmen and Mineng

These groups used the same Manitjmat and Wardunmat moieties, but they determined descent patrilineally.

=== Nyakinyaki ===
- They had section levels similar to the Western Desert types, which were both patrilineal local descent groups
- Includes Balardong and Nyakinyaki

These groups used (Bee-eater) Birranga and (Sacred Kingfisher) Djuak as the "skin" groups.

=== Wudjari ===
- Similar to the Nyakinyaki, but they had named patrilineal "totemic" descent units.
- Includes Goreng and Wudjari

== Terminology ==
Local descent groups are generally patrilineal in type, in which members are linked by both descent and through mythological ties to a named ancestor. Local descent groups are always exogamous. They are associated with specific territories held collectively in trust in perpetuity.

Totemic descent groups are similar, but the mythical significance of the species after whom the descent group is named is much stronger, and figures much more significantly in the myths of its members. Members may not be genealogically related, and these groups are almost always exogamous.

- in patrilineal totemic descent clans: territory is always important
- in matrilineal totemic descent groups: territory is less important, as women frequently move from their matrilineal areas.

Moieties are two mutually exclusive categories, by which everyone in the world is classified; they are always exogamous. Moieties may be determined by either patrilineal or matrilineal kinship and descent (determined by the moiety of the father or the mother).

Alternate generation levels classify a person in the same generation level with grandparents and grandchildren. Parents and children would also share the same generation level. In alternate generation levels, marriage is endogamous.

Sectional systems (often called "skin") are usually one of four named groups to which a person belongs by birth. (Although "skin' may be conferred to outsiders as adults.) These groups are always exogamous.

Daisy Bates stated that under the system, each Noongar was placed in the same class as their mother, and no Noongar was permitted to marry someone of the same class as themselves. The classes were:

- Ballaroke
- Tdondarup
- Ngotak
- Nagarnook
- Nogonyuk
- Mongalung
- Narrangur

Early observers of Noongar culture were sometimes confused by aspects of this kinship and class systems. George Grey incorrectly referred to the class names as family names, for example. Some confusion was also caused because a Noongar might refer to any relative of the same generation and class as themselves as their brother or sister; similarly, any older woman of the same class could be referred to as their mother.

== See also ==
- Aboriginal groupings of Western Australia
- Australian Aboriginal kinship
