= Malaluba Gumana =

Australian Aboriginal artist

Malaluba Gumana (born 1953) is an Australian Aboriginal artist from northeast Arnhem Land, who has gained prominence through her work in painting and the production of larrakitj, the memorial poles traditionally used by Yolngu people in a mortuary ceremony.

Her work is held in collection at the National Gallery of Australia and the Art Gallery of New South Wales. She has won awards in categories for bark painting and three-dimensional work at the Telstra National Aboriginal and Torres Strait Islander Art Awards (NATSIAA). Her work is represented in the Kerry Stokes Larrakitj Collection, which was exhibited by the Art Gallery of Western Australia and also gained an exhibition place at the Sydney Biennale.

== Background ==
Gumana was born in 1953 and lived in the Gangan homeland of the Blue Mud Bay region in northeast Arnhem Land. She is an artist with Buku-Larrŋgay Mulka Centre in Yirrkala, an Indigenous community-controlled art centre of northeast Arnhem Land. Her complex and fluid paintings frequently refer to the story of the all-powerful Rainbow Serpent or wititj (olive python) as it travels through her mother's Gålpu clan lands. She mainly represents the Gålpu clan designs of dhatam (water lily), djari (rainbow), djayku (file snake) and wititj (olive python), applying the technique of marwat (cross-hatching) using a finely controlled hair brush. Intellectual property rights of clan designs are held by the clan, and only people with rights to certain designs are able to use them.

Gumana is well known for her production of larrakitj which the Yolngu people used as bone receptacles in traditional funerary rites. The larrakitj are made from stringy bark trees that have been hollowed out by termites. The trees are selected and harvested after the dry-season fires and are then smoothed and shaped for painting with ochres in a cultural process, with each larrakitj presenting clan-specific designs.

== Career ==
From 2006, Gumana started creating larger and more complex work with the encouragement of her art centre. In 2007, her work was shown for the National Aboriginal and Torres Strait Islander Art Awards (NATSIAA) at the Museum and Art Gallery of the Northern Territory in Darwin. In 2008, her bark and hollow logs sold out at an exhibition with Niagara Galleries, Melbourne, and her dhatam imagery was selected by the Garma Festival of Traditional Cultures for T-shirt and promotional material. By 2009, her larrakitj were part of the Kerry Stokes Larrakitj Collection, which exhibited that year at the Art Gallery of Western Australia, Perth, and also won an exhibition place in the 17th Sydney Biennale at the Museum of Contemporary Art in 2010. In 2013, she won a NATSIAA award in the category for Bark Painting, followed by another win in 2019 of NATSIAA's Wandjuk Marika Memorial 3D Award for three-dimensional work by an Indigenous artist.

Gumana's work is held in permanent collections at the National Gallery of Australia and the Art Gallery of New South Wales. Her work is part of Kerry Stokes' Larrakitj Collection, and is also held in private art collections at Woodside Energy Ltd and the Estate of Kerry Packer.

== Work ==
=== Exhibitions ===
- 2007 National Aboriginal and Torres Strait Islander Art Awards, Museum and Art Gallery of the Northern Territory, Darwin, Northern Territory
- 2008 Garrimala - Bark Paintings and Memorial Poles, Niagara Galleries, Richmond, Victoria
- 2008 Blue Chip X - Collectors Exhibition, Niagara Galleries, Melbourne, Victoria
- 2008 National Aboriginal and Torres Strait Islander Art Awards, Museum and Art Gallery of the Northern Territory, Darwin, Northern Territory
- 2009 Larrakitj - the Kerry Stokes Collection, Art Gallery of Western Australia, Perth, Western Australia
- 2010 17th Biennale of Sydney, Larrakitj - the Kerry Stokes Collection, Museum of Contemporary Art, Sydney, New South Wales
- 2013 National Aboriginal and Torres Strait Islander Art Awards, Museum and Art Gallery of the Northern Territory, Darwin, Northern Territory (award in the category of Bark Painting)
- 2019 National Aboriginal and Torres Strait Islander Art Awards, Museum and Art Gallery of the Northern Territory|, Darwin, Northern Territory (Wandjuk Marika Memorial 3D Award)

=== Collections ===
- National Gallery of Australia
- Art Gallery of New South Wales
- Larrakitj Collection of Kerry Stokes
- Estate of Kerry Packer
- Woodside Energy Ltd. Art Collection
- Kluge-Ruhe Aboriginal Art Collection of the University of Virginia
- San Antonio Museum of Art

=== Awards ===
- Use of her Dhatam imagery for Garma 2008 T-shirt and promotional material.
- Telstra Bark Painting Award, NATSIAA, 2013
- Wandjuk Marika Memorial 3D Award, NATSIAA, 2019
