= Mulkun Wirrpanda =

Indigenous Australian artist

- Born: 1947; Arnhem Land, Northern Territory, Australia
- Died: 16 February 2021 (aged 73–74)
- Occupation(s): Artist, knowledge holder
- Spouse: Wakuthi Marawili
- Children: Yalmakany, Gurrundul, Borrak
- Father: Dhakiyarr Wirrpanda

Mulkuṉ Wirrpanda (1947 – 16 February 2021) was an Aboriginal Australian community leader and artist from Yirrkala, Arnhem Land, in the Northern Territory of Australia. Coming from a family of artists, her work focuses on botany surrounding her homelands.

== Life ==
Mulkuṉ Wirrpanda was born in 1947, part of the Dhudi-Djapu clan of the Yolngu people, from the homeland of Dhuruputjpi. Her father was community leader Dhakiyarr Wirrpanda, who was involved in the Caledon Bay crisis.

Wirrpanda was featured in the film Dhakiyarr vs the King, which focused on her father’s disappearance from Darwin and her family’s reconciliation afterwards. She was shown preparing armbands for her family's ceremonial performance in Darwin while recounting the events that lead to his arrest. Her father killed policeman Albert McColl, who was searching for other Yolngu men who had killed a Japanese fisherman in Caledon Bay. Seeing that McColl had apprehended his wife and child, Dhakiyarr killed McColl. Her father was set to receive the death penalty yet was later released. He was never seen again, leading the family and others familiar with the case to believe he was killed shortly after his release.

Most of Wirrpanda's life was spent in the homelands of Yilpara, Dhuruputjpi, and Gangan, as she was an early leader of the homelands movement in Arnhem Land. She married Madarrpa clan leader Wakuthi Marawili (who predeceased her), with whom she had three children. Her two daughters, Yalmakany and Gurrundul, are senior rangers, and her son, Borrak, is a lawman. By kinship, current Madarrpa leader Djambawa Marawili, who was chair of the Buku-Larrnggay Mulka Art Centre and Museum, is also considered her son by kinship.

In her community, Wirrpanda was regarded as an important elder and ceremonial leader, which was a rare position for a woman to hold in Yolngu law.

She died on 16 February 2021.

== Art ==
Wirrpanda's artwork largely focuses on edible plants and natural species as well as the Dhudi-Djapu miny'tji relating to her land near Dhuruputjpi. She explores these subjects through various mediums including bark painting, ceremonial poles, weaving and prints.

She worked at the Buku-Larrnggay Mulka Centre in Yirrkala.

Wirrpanda produced a series of exhibitions surrounding botany and plant life in the Miwatj region with British painter John Wolesely. This partnership began through "Djalkiri: We are standing on their names", a collaborative project between Yolngu leaders and ethnobotanists to generate prints showcasing their land through different perspectives.

Working with the Yirrkala print space, Wirrpanda contributed to a 2010 exhibition of string figures (matjka) in recollection of anthropologist Frederick McCarthy’s record of string figures in Arnhem Land as part of a 1948 expedition.

== Midawarr | Harvest ==
Since 2009, Wirrpanda worked with British-born painter John Wolesely (born 1938) to paint the plant life in Arnhem Land. They met every Midawarr (harvest) season for several years to create more than 80 works and multimedia focusing on Yolngu knowledge and sustainable living practices, documenting more than 30 species. Their various exhibitions included various bark paintings, larrakitj (ceremonial poles), prints, watercolour, and mixed media. The main exhibit launched at the National Museum of Australia in November 2017 and coincided with the release of the book, Midawarr | Harvest, which functions as a modern botanical guide for Yolngu and Australian communities.

Wolesely met Wirrpanda when he was invited by the Nomad Art Gallery to meet Yolngu painters and paint the land with them. Developing a strong relationship, she adopted Wolesely as her wawa (brother) and named him Langgurrk. Wirrpanda was passionate about educating her community and future generations about healthy living, saying to Wolesely, "I'm going to paint lots of these plants, and one of the reasons I'm going to paint them is my people are dying because they're eating the wrong food". She identified the overwhelming presence of junk food as a major problem for Aboriginal communities, and aimed to make this book readily available to the community and youth as a tool for knowledge.

Wirrpanda collected edible plant life and natural species around the bush to paint with Wolesely, and their project highlighted the different styles of painting between their skill sets and perspectives. Wolesely described his approach as "full frontal", in which a subject's outside appearance was the focus, but it also existed to produce a dialogue of overlapping systems and ideas. On the other hand, Wirrpanda homed in on a subject’s inner essence with respect to how it moves and has its being. In Yolngu belief systems, sacred designs (mint'jyi) are bestowed to all aspects of yolngu land and plants, but artists only have authority to paint designs relating to their own moiety, clan, and ancestors. To accommodate plant life that didn't belong to her identity, she developed an "ordinary" method of depicting them, saying, "I had to let the plants tell me what their secular identity or character was. By the way they grow or the way they look or express themselves. They gave me their rhythm or their pattern."In doing so, Wirrpanda skirts around sacred designs by alluding to them without evoking their ancestral essence. This new approach, coupled with working alongside Wolesely's western perspectives, allowed her to probe the outer limits of Yolngu systems.

== Exhibitions ==
=== Solo exhibitions ===
- Djalkiri: We are Standing on their Names
- Midawarr|Harvest: The Art of Ms. Wirrpanda and John Wolesely
- Gurrutu: The Art of Mulkun Wirrpanda
- Solidarity: Inscriptions for the Future
- Matriarchs: Motherlines of the Yolngu and Tiwi Islands
- Mother to Daughter: On Art and Caring for Homelands
- A Yirrkala Cracker
- Yirrkala, After Berndt
- Mulkun Wirrpanda / Fiona MacDonald: More Than Honeyed Words
- Barrupu Yunupingu/Mulkun Wirrpanda: Fire, Water, and Honey
- Mulkun Wirrpanda - One Lore, Two Law, Outlaw: Dhakiyarr vs the King

=== Group exhibitions ===
- Maḏayin: Eight Decades of Aboriginal Australian Bark Painting from Yirrkala, the first major exhibition of bark painting to tour the United States (Maḏayin is a Yolŋu term meaning "sacred" and "hidden".)

== Collections ==
- National Gallery of Australia
- National Gallery of Victoria
- National Gallery of New South Wales
- Queensland Art Gallery
- Monash University
- Kluge-Ruhe Aboriginal Art Collection
