= Fralin Museum of Art =

Art museum in Virginia, US

The Fralin Museum of Art at the University of Virginia
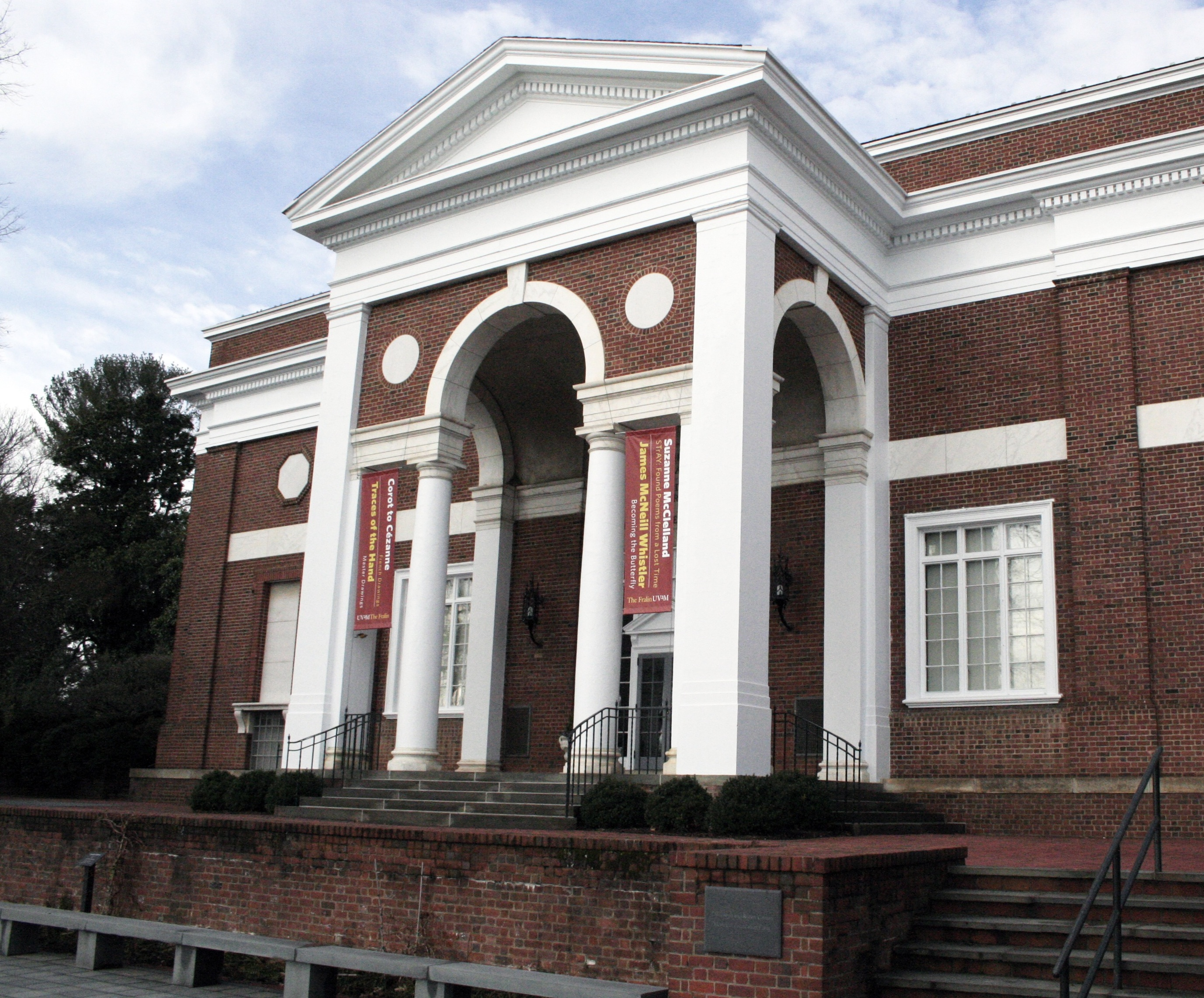
- Established: 1935 (as the University of Virginia Art Museum)
- Location: 155 Rugby Road, Thomas H. Bayly Building, Charlottesville, Virginia 22904; United States
- Coordinates: 38.038526°N 78.502786°W
- Type: Art museum
- Director: Karen E. Milbourne
- Website: uvafralinartmuseum.virginia.edu

The Fralin Museum of Art is an art museum at the University of Virginia. Before 2012, it was known as the University of Virginia Art Museum. It occupies the historic Thomas H. Bayly Building on Rugby Road in Charlottesville, Virginia, a short distance from the Rotunda. The museum's permanent collection consists of nearly 14,000 works; African art, American Indian art, and European and American painting, photography, and works on paper are particularly well represented. The Fralin serves as a teaching museum for academic departments in the university, and serves the community at large with several outreach programs. Admission is free of charge and open to the public.

In the spring of 2012, Cynthia and W. Heywood Fralin announced a bequest of their collection of American art to the museum. In honor of their gift and Heywood Fralin's service to the university and to the arts in Virginia, the Board of Visitors voted to name the museum the Fralin Museum of Art.

== History ==
The museum was inaugurated in 1935 in a building designed by Edmund S. Campbell, dean of the School of Art and Architecture, who also served as the museum's first director. A modest collection of art was initially housed in the building, with the university's Special Collections Library holding the majority of the university's collections, including significant pieces of decorative art and documents from Thomas Jefferson. The museum closed during World War II and again during the 1960s, when the School of Architecture requisitioned it for additional classrooms. Subsequently, the museum was reconstituted in 1974 and placed under the Art Department with its Chair, Frederick Hartt, serving as director. David B. Lawall was appointed as curator.

When Lawall assumed the directorship in 1985, the museum entered a phase of dramatic expansion through gifts, purchases and extended loans; by 1995 the collection contained an estimated 8,500 objects. Succeeding Lawall as director were Anthony G. Hirschel (1990–1996), Jill Hartz (1997–2007), Elizabeth Hutton Turner as interim director (2008–2009), and Bruce Boucher (2009–2016). In November 2016, Matthew McLendon was named director and chief curator of the museum. McLendon departed in 2023, after a period that saw the implementation of a national media strategy, growth in public programs and museum attendance; the addition of a combined $10 million in staff and programmatic endowments; and significant increases in community-based programming and online resources. After a national search, a committee of faculty and staff affiliated with the arts chose Karen Elizabeth Milbourne, who earned a doctorate in art history from the University of Iowa in 2003 and a bachelor’s degree in African studies from Bryn Mawr College to lead The Fralin. Previously, she served as senior curator at the Smithsonian National Museum of African Art.

Accreditation with the American Alliance of Museums was first achieved in 2001, with the most recent re-accreditation in 2021. Spaces devoted to exhibiting and teaching comprise 6,000 square feet, including Print Study and Object Study galleries, which were introduced after a $2 million renovation in 2009.

== Audience and outreach ==
M. Jordan Love was appointed as full-time academic curator in August 2012, through a grant from the Andrew W. Mellon Foundation. In 2007–2008, six academic departments incorporated objects from exhibitions or the permanent collection into their courses; by 2011–2012, that number had risen to nineteen and in 2015-2016, it has continued to climb to twenty-four departments and programs. Interactive web-based programming allows students and the general public to access permanent collections and to study individual objects. Programs of service to the local community include Eyes On Art, for Alzheimer's patients and their caregivers, Early Visions, which partners university student docents with children from the Charlottesville Boys and Girls Clubs, and Writer's Eye, which invites children and adults to submit original prose and poetry inspired by works of art in the museum, providing visitors with opportunities to explore varied cultures and historical periods.

== The collection ==
Areas of strength in the collection include 18th-, 19th- and 20th-century American and European painting, Old Master and modern prints and drawings, 19th-, 20th- and 21st-century photography, East and South Asian painting, and African, Pre-Columbian, and Native American art and artifacts. Today, the museum features an encyclopedic permanent collection of nearly 14,000 objects and collects more systematically across key areas while refocusing upon holdings in Native American and non-western art.

In addition, the university holds one of the most important collections of Australian Aboriginal art outside Australia with its own archive, the Kluge-Ruhe Aboriginal Art Collection.

== See also ==
- List of art museums
- List of museums in Virginia
