= Gulumbu Yunupingu =

Aboriginal artist

- Born: 1943; Gunyangara, Northern Territory
- Died: 9 May 2012; Gove, Northern Territory
- Spouse: Mutitjpuy Mununggur
- Parents: Mungurrawuy Yunupingu (father); Bakili (mother)
- Awards: National Aboriginal & Torres Strait Islander Art Award (2004)

Gulumbu Yunupingu (1943 – 9 May 2012), after her death known as Djotarra or Ms Yunupingu, was an Australian Aboriginal artist and women's leader from the Yolngu people of Arnhem Land, in the Northern Territory of Australia.

== Early life and family ==
Born in Gunyangara, Northern Territory in 1943, Yunupingu was a member of the Gumatj clan and spoke the Gumatj language.

As the eldest daughter of artist and Gumatj leader Mungurrawuy Yunupingu, she was sister to Aboriginal leader Galarrwuy Yunupingu and singer Mandawuy Yunupingu (of Yothu Yindi). Her sisters included artists Nancy Gaymala Yunupingu, Nyapanyapa Yunupingu, and Eunice Djerrkngu Yunupingu (c.1945–2022), and Barrupu Yunupingu (1948–2012). She married Yirrkala church panel artist, Mutitjpuy Mununggur with whom, she had 4 children. Her daughter, Dhambit Mununggurr continued in her footsteps as an artist. Her family life faced significant challenges, including the deaths of her only son and a daughter in 2007.

Prior to rise to stardom as an artist, Yunupingu worked as a teacher's aid and a Bible translator into her first language, Gumatj. She was also known as a health worker and healer at her Dilthan Yolngunha healing centre, wherein she integrated Western medicine with Bush medicine.

A prominent figure among women artists at Yirrkala, Gulumbu was one of the leaders who shifted their focus away from painting sacred clan designs in their work.

== Art career ==
Gulumbu Yunupingu, also known as the Star Lady, was the first Yolngu woman to gain significant international acclaim for bark paintings. She was taught by her father, Mungurrawuy Yunupingu, and gained inspiration from Yolngu ancestral stories told by him. However, she chose to depict small abstractions from those grand creational epics with a universal appeal - the Ganyu (stars) and Garak (universe) are major subjects of Gulumbu’s works. She developed her signature style of a dense network of crosses representing the stars, unified by fields of dots representing everything that isn't seen. Her paintings reflect on the shared contemporaneity across the world and the relationship between selves and the universe. Additionally, she believed stars symbolize the importance of striving for harmony, explaining, “We can all look at the stars, whichever sky we're looking at."

In 1999, together with her sister Gaymala and Dhuwarrwarr Marika, Gulumbu was engaged to paint a large film set for the film Yolngu Boy, based on the historic Yirrkala Church Panels.

Yunupingu was a versatile artist, working in several mediums. During her early career she engaged in weaving, jewelry making, and printmaking. It was not until she began painting in the early 2000s and won the National Aboriginal and Torres Strait Islander Art Award in 2004 that her artistic endeavors garnered attention. She gained acclaim due to her remarkable abstract visuals and artistic innovation in the field of bark painting.

In 2012, a painting on wood titled Garrurru (Sail), weighing a tonne and measuring seven by three metres, was installed at the Australian National University, at the Hedley Bull Centre for World Politics. The word garrurru is the Yolngu word for "sail", and derives from the word for sailcloth in the Makassarese language. Yunupingu appeared in public at the launch for the last time, despite failing health.

Untitled screenprint, 2012 was the last piece of artwork that Gulumbu created before her death. She described the piece, saying, "When a person is sick, or maybe dying, people gather around to sing and dance, laugh and cry to make that person happy. It is what we Yolngu do. Here are all the people trying to make that person feel better and these are all the tears they are crying."

== Exhibitions and collections ==
Her art has been widely exhibited all around the world, and was the opening exhibit in the newly-restored $370 million Muse du quai Branly in Paris. in 2006. She was one of eight Aboriginal artists whose art was incorporated into the design of the museum itself, creating a ceiling of stars composed of thousands of dots on the second floor of the building. The curatorial team visited Gulumbu for the commission to hear her clan’s customary stories and gained approval to adapt her work into a design one hundred times larger than the original, embedded into the building fabric in Paris. At the official Sydney launch of the commission in 2005, she gave a speech to emphasize how important it was for her to share her art and culture with the world for future generations: "This is from my heart, to you, to share, for the whole world to understand my culture." Her work remains part of the largest international commission of contemporary indigenous art from Australia. She had her first solo show at the Alcaston Gallery in 2004. Her work has also been featured in the Basic Needs Pavilion at the Hannover World Expo in 2000, the Melbourne Art Fair and the Kerry Stokes Larrikitj Collection.

Her work is also exhibited in the National Gallery of Australia, as well as other major exhibitions including the Art Gallery of New South Wales, Art Gallery of Western Australia, Metropolitan Museum of Art, Museum and Art Gallery of the Northern Territory, Museum of Contemporary Art Australia, National Gallery of Victoria, and Queensland Art Gallery | Gallery of Modern Art.

In 2018 Yunupingu's work was included in the exhibition Marking the Infinite: Contemporary Women Artists from Aboriginal Australia at The Phillips Collection.

Gulumbu's work is featured in Maḏayin: Eight Decades of Aboriginal Australian Bark Painting from Yirrkala, an exhibition that opened at the Hood Museum of Art, Dartmouth in September 2022 and continues to tour the United States. The exhibition specifically showcases her 2009 piece Ganyu (Stars). Describing the significance of her work, Gulumbu touched on themes of universality despite cultural differences, saying, “We are just like the stars. All gathered close together. We are really as one like the stars.”

== Awards ==
Yunupingu has won many awards for her work. In 2004 she won the 'Big Telstra' prize at the 21st National Aboriginal & Torres Strait Islander Art Award for a piece entitled Garak, The Universe, which consists of three memorial poles, decorated in her own style, which combines traditional Yolngu designs with her own modern interpretation.

== Death ==
Yunupingu suffered from terminal cancer, but she continued journeying to various artistic events, such as the MCA in Sydney, where her works were displayed. She died on 9 May 2012 at her home in Gunyangara (Ski Beach), after lapsing into a coma some time before. Her memorial service took place at Gunyangara and her funeral at Dhanaya. Given her world-wide renown, her family gave consent to her name appearing in text, but asked that her name is not spoken, and no image of her shown. She can be referred to as Djotarra or Ms Yunupingu.
