= Australian Aboriginal kinship systems =

Systems of law covering social interactions in Australian Aboriginal societies

Aboriginal Australian kinship comprises the systems of Aboriginal customary law governing social interaction relating to kinship in traditional Aboriginal cultures. It is an integral part of the culture of every Aboriginal group across Australia, and particularly important with regard to marriages between Aboriginal people.

== Subsection system ==
Subsection systems are a unique social structure that divide all of Australian Aboriginal society into a number of groups, each of which combines particular sets of kin. In Central Australian Aboriginal English vernacular, subsections are widely known as "skins". Each subsection is given a name that can be used to refer to individual members of that group. Skin is passed down by a person's parents to their children.

The name of the groups can vary. There are systems with two such groupings (these are known as 'moieties' in kinship studies), systems with four (sections), six, and eight (subsection systems). Some language groups extend this by having distinct male and female forms, giving a total of sixteen skin names, for example the Pintupi (listed below) and Warlpiri. While membership in skin groups is ideally based on blood relations, Australian Aboriginal subsection systems are classificatory, meaning that even people who are not actual blood relations are assigned to a subsection. They are also universal, meaning that every member of the society is assigned a position in the system.

Subsection systems are found in Aboriginal societies across much of Central, Western and Northern Australia. On the basis of detailed analysis and comparison of the various subsection systems and their terminologies, and in particular the apparent prefix /j-/ for male and /n-/ for female, it has been identified as a social innovation originally from the Daly River region of the Northern Territory, which then spread rapidly southwards to other groups.

=== Systems with two groupings (moieties) ===
==== Yolngu ====
The Yolŋu people of north-eastern Arnhem Land divide society (and much of the natural world) into two moieties: Dhuwa and Yirritja. Each of these is represented by people of a number of different groups (each with their own lands, languages and philosophies) through their hereditary estates – so many things are either Yirritja or Dhuwa:

Skin name	Clan groups
Yirritja	Gumatj, Gupapuyngu, Wangurri, Ritharrngu, Mangalili, Munyuku, Madarrpa, Warramiri, Dhalwangu, Liyalanmirri.
Dhuwa	Rirratjingu, Galpu, Djambarrpuyngu, Golumala, Marrakulu, Marrangu, Djapu, Datiwuy, Ngaymil, Djarrwark.

Fish, stone, river, sea etc., belongs to one or the other moiety. Things that are not either Dhuwa or Yirritja are called wakinŋu. Yolŋu also have a kinship system with eight subsections (four Dhuwa and four Yirritja which is what creates moiety).

=== Systems with four sections ===
==== Gamilaraay ====
The Gamilaraay language group from New South Wales have a four-section system.

Moiety	Section name (female)	Marries (male)	Children
Wudhurruu	Gabudhaa	Yibaay	Marrii, Maadhaa
Wudhurruu	Maadhaa	Gambuu	Gabii, Gabudhaa
Yangu(r)u	Buudhaa	Marrii	Yibaay, Yibadhaa
Yangu(r)u	Yibadhaa	Gabii	Gambuu, Buudhaa

==== Martuthunira ====
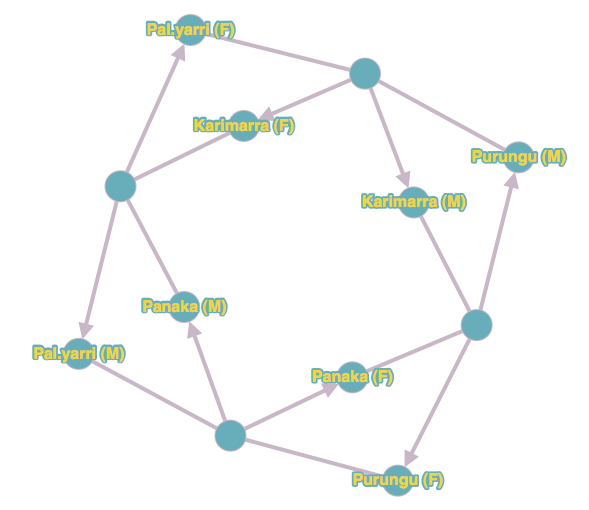
Graph that sums up kinship in the Martuthunira society. Unnamed nodes stand for different marriage types: they are linked to spouses by simple lines and to children by arrows.

The Martuthunira language group from the Pilbara region of Western Australia have a four-section system. (The spelling ⟨l.y⟩ indicates that the letters represent two distinct phonemes, and are not a digraph).

Section name (female)	Marries (male)	Children
Karimarra	Panaka	Pal.yarri
Panaka	Karimarra	Purungu
Pal.yarri	Purungu	Karimarra
Purungu	Pal.yarri	Panaka

Similar systems are found across most language groups in the Pilbara, though with some variation in the forms of the names. For example, speakers of Ngarla use Milangka where Martuthunira use Pal.yarri.

==== Alyawarra ====
The Alyawarre language group from Central Australia also have a four-section system, but use different terms from the Martuthunira.

Section name (female)	Marries (male)	Children
Kngwarriya	Upurla	Kimarra
Upurla	Kngwarriya	Pitjarra
Pitjarra	Kimarra	Upurla
Kimarra	Pitjarra	Kngwarriya

=== Systems with eight groups (subsection systems) ===
==== Lardil ====
The Lardil of Mornington Island in the Gulf of Carpentaria have eight subsection groups, shown here with some of their totems:

Subsection group (father)	Totems	May marry only subsection group (mother)	Children will be
Balyarriny	Black tiger shark, sea turtle	Kamarrangi	Buranyi
Bangariny	Brown shark, turtle	Yakimarr	Ngarrijbalangi
Buranyi	Crane, salt water, sleeping turtle	Kangal	Balyarriny
Burrarangi	Lightning, rough sea, black dingo	Ngarrijbalangi	Kamarrangi
Kamarrangi	Rock, pelican, brolga, red dingo	Balyarriny	Burrarangi
Kangal	Barramundi, grey shark	Buranyi	Yakimarr
Ngarrijbalangi	Rainbird, shooting star, egret	Burrarangi	Bangariny
Yakimarr	Seagull, barramundi, grey shark	Bangariny	Kangal

Each Lardil person belongs to one of these groups. Their paternal grandfather's subsection determines their own; so a Balyarriny man or woman will have a Balyarriny grandfather. Members of each group may only marry members of one other, specified, group.

Once a person's subsection group is known, their relationship to any other Lardil can be determined. A Ngarrijbalangi is a 'father' to a Bangariny, a 'father-in-law' to a Yakimarr and a 'son' to another Bangariny, either in a social sense or purely through linearship.

The mechanics of the Lardil skin system means that generations of males cycle back and forth between two subsections. Ngarrijbalangi is father to Bangariny and Bangariny is father to Ngarrijbalangi and similarly for the three other pairs of subsections. Generations of women, however, cycle through four subsections before arriving back at the starting point. This means that a woman has the same subsection name as her (matrilineal) great-great-grandmother.

==== Pintupi ====
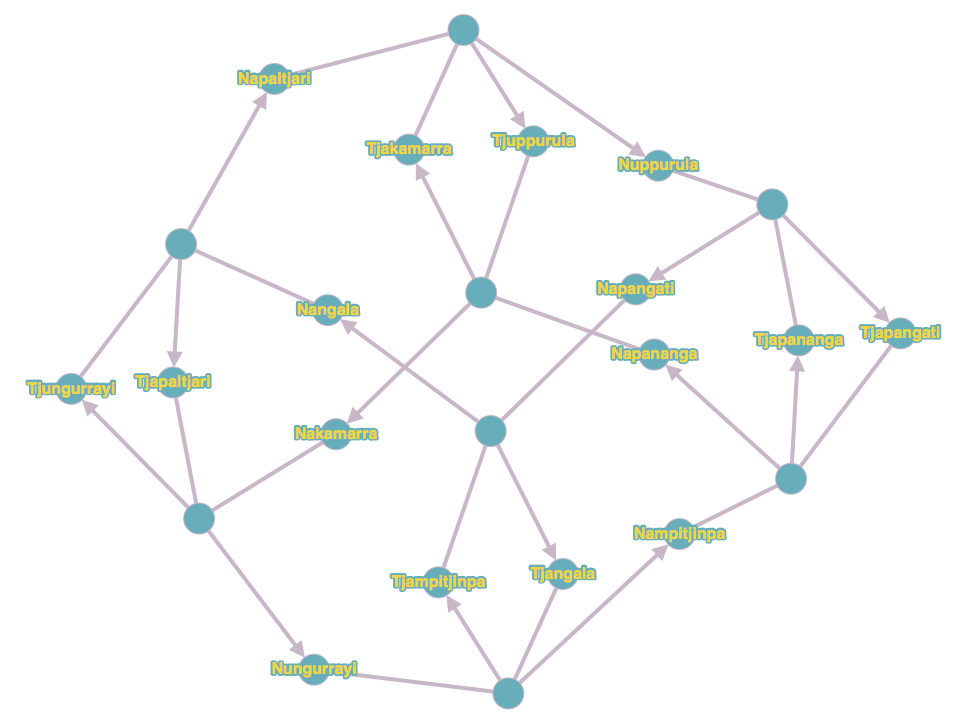
Graph that sums up kinship among Warlpiri (Australian aboriginals). Unlabelled nodes stand for allowed weddings. Resulting children subsections are indicated by arrows.

The Pintupi of the Western Desert also have an eight-subsection system, made more complex by distinct forms for male and female subsection names; male forms begin with "Tj", the female forms with "N". The Warlpiri system is almost the same:

Gender	Subsection name	First marriage preference	Children will be
Male	Tjapaltjarri	Nakamarra	Tjungurrayi, Nungurrayi
Female	Napaltjarri	Tjakamarra	Tjupurrula, Napurrula
Male	Tjapangati	Nampitjinpa	Tjapanangka, Napanangka
Female	Napangati	Tjampitjinpa	Tjangala, Nangala
Male	Tjakamarra	Napaltjarri	Tjupurrula, Napurrula
Female	Nakamarra	Tjapaltjarri	Tjungurrayi, Nungurrayi
Male	Tjampitjinpa	Napangati	Tjangala, Nangala
Female	Nampitjinpa	Tjapangati	Tjapanangka, Napanangka
Male	Tjapanangka	Napurrula	Tjapangati, Napangati
Female	Napanangka	Tjupurrula	Tjakamarra, Nakamarra
Male	Tjungurrayi	Nangala	Tjapaltjarri, Napaltjarri
Female	Nungurrayi	Tjangala	Tjampitjinpa, Nampitjinpa
Male	Tjupurrula	Napanangka	Tjakamarra, Nakamarra
Female	Napurrula	Tjapanangka	Tjapangati, Napangati
Male	Tjangala	Nungurrayi	Tjampitjinpa, Nampitjinpa
Female	Nangala	Tjungurrayi	Tjapaltjarri, Napaltjarri

==== Kunwinjku ====
The Kunwinjku of Western Arnhem Land have a similar system; male forms begin with Na-, the female forms with Ngal-:

Gender	Subsection name	First marriage preference	Second marriage preference	First marriage children will be	Second marriage children will be
Male	Nabulanj	Ngalwakadj	Ngalkangila	Nabangardi, Ngalbangardi	Nakodjok, Ngalkodjok
Female	Ngalbulanj	Nawakadj	Nakangila	Nawamud, Ngalwamud	Nawamud, Ngalwamud
Male	Nangarridj	Ngalkangila	Ngalwakadj	Nakodjok, Ngalkodjok	Nabangardi; Ngalbangardi
Female	Ngalgarridj	Nakangila	Nawakadj	Nakamarrang, Ngalkamarrang	Nakamarrang, Ngalkamarrang
Male	Nakamarrang	Ngalkodjok	Ngalbangardi	Nawakadj, Ngalwakadj	Nakangila; Ngalkangila
Female	Ngalkamarrang	Nakodjok	Nabangardi	Nabulanj, Ngalbulanj	Nabulanj, Ngalbulanj
Male	Nawamud	Ngalbangardi	Ngalkodjok	Nakangila, Ngalkangila	Nawakadj, Ngalwakadj
Female	Ngalwamud	Nabangardi	Nakodjok	Nangarridj, Ngalgarridj	Nangarridj, Ngalgarridj
Male	Nawakadj	Ngalbulanj	Ngalgarridj	Nawamud, Ngalwamud	Nakamarrang, Ngalkamarrang
Female	Ngalwakadj	Nabulanj	Nangarridj	Nabangardi, Ngalbangardi	Nabangardi, Ngalbangardi
Male	Nakangila	Ngalgarridj	Ngalbulanj	Nakamarrang, Ngalkammarang	Nawamud, Ngalwamud
Female	Ngalkangila	Nangarridj	Nabulanj	Nakodjok, Ngalkodjok	Nakodjok, Ngalkodjok
Male	Nakodjok	Ngalkamarrang	Ngalwamud	Nabulanj, Ngalbulanj	Nangarridj, Ngalgarridj
Female	Ngalkodjok	Nakamarrang	Nawamud	Nawakadj, Ngalwakadj	Nawakadj, Ngalwakadj
Male	Nabangardi	Ngalwamud	Ngalkamarrang	Nangarridj, Ngalgarridj	Nabulanj, Ngalbulanj
Female	Ngalbangardi	Nawamud	Nakamarrang	Nakangila, Ngalkangila	Nakangila, Ngalkangila

Each person therefore has a patrimoiety and a matrimoiety, a father's and a mother's subsection group.

=== Extension of the system to non-relatives ===
Outsiders who have significant interaction with such groups may be given a 'skin name', commonly based on the people they have interacted with and the types of interaction.

== Some common kinship terms used in Aboriginal English ==
The variety of English used by many Australian Aboriginal people employs kinship terms in ways that are based on their equivalents in Australian Aboriginal languages.

- Aunty and uncle are terms of address for older people, to whom the speaker may not be related.
- Brother and sister—as well as for reference to siblings this term is used to refer to children of one's mother's sister and of father's brother (cousin), just as in many indigenous languages.
- Cousin-brother and cousin-sister are often used to refer to children of one's mother's sister and father's brother.
- Cousin refers to children of one's father's sister and mother's brother, but may be extended to any relative of one's own generation, such as one who might share the same great-grandparent, which is a second-cousin in Aboriginal terms.
- In south-east Queensland, daughter is used to refer to any woman of one's great-grandparents' generation. This is due to the cyclical nature of traditional kinship systems and mirrors usage in many Australian languages.
- Father and mother include any relative of one's parents' generation, such as uncles, aunts, their own cousins and in-laws.
- Grandfather and grandmother can refer to anyone of one's grandparents' generation. Grandfather can also refer to any respected elderly man, to whom the speaker may not be related.
- Poison refers to a relation one is obligated to avoid. See avoidance speech and Australian Aboriginal avoidance practices.
- The term second, or little bit in northern Australia, is used with a distant relative who is described using a close kinship term. For example, one's second father or little bit father is a man of one's father's generation not closely related to the speaker. Usually having a second mother is having a woman of your own mother's generation who seems to act like a mother and would most likely care for you if anything were to happen to your own parents. It is contrasted with close, near or true.
- A skin or skin group is a section determined by the skin of a person's parents, and determines whom a person is eligible to marry.
  - Moiety is sometimes used synonymously, though it properly refers to sections in systems with only two descent groups.
- Skinship can refer to the kinship system in its entirety, but more often refers to an individual's position and relationship to others in such a system.
- Son can refer to any male of the next generation, such as nephews, just as daughter can refer to any female of the next generation, including nieces.

== See also ==
- Irish kinship
- Noongar kin systems
- Warlpiri kinship
