= Kluge-Ruhe Aboriginal Art Collection =

Kluge-Ruhe Aboriginal Art Collection of the University of Virginia
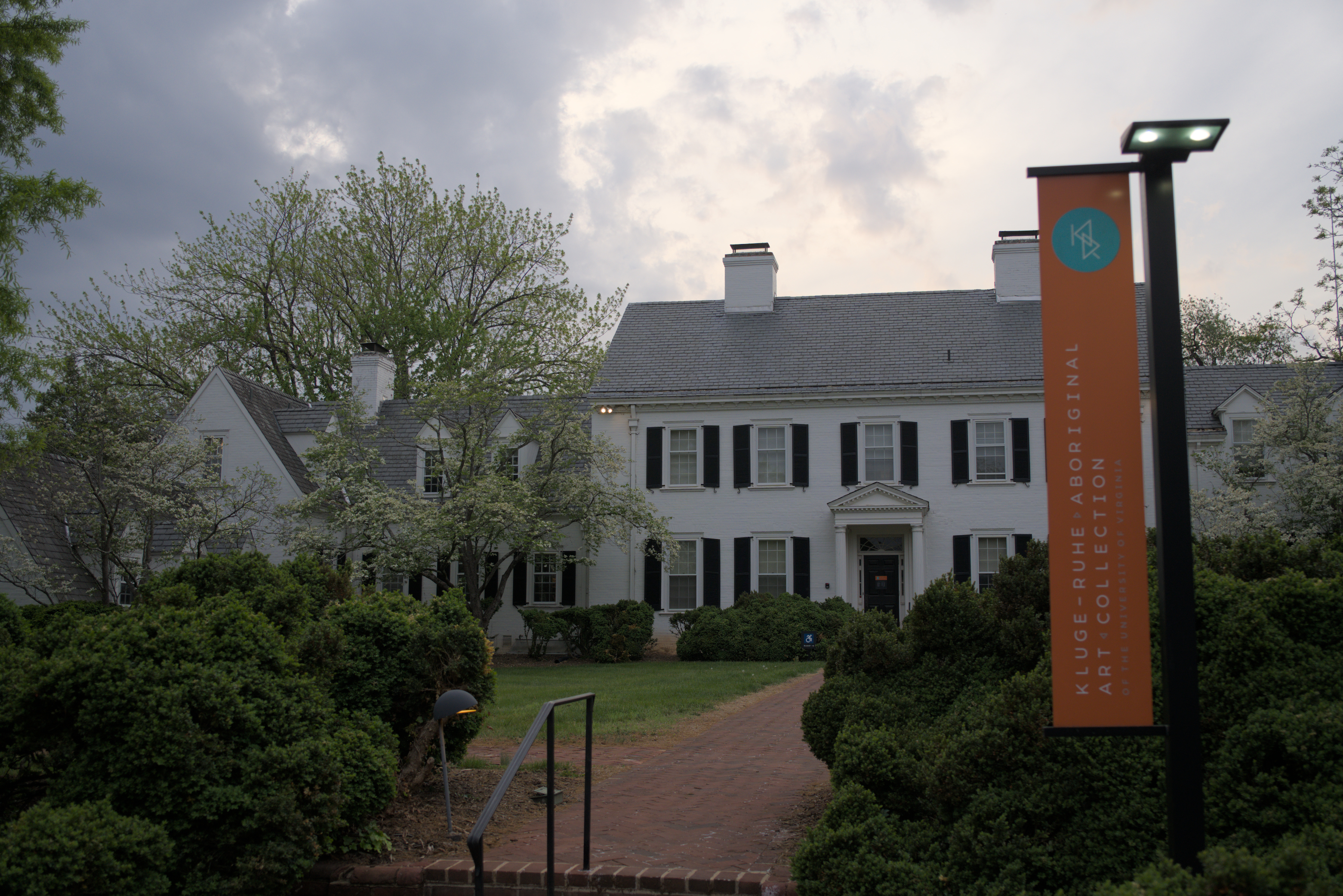
- The Kluge-Ruhe Aboriginal Art Collection is housed in a historic home in the Pantops region of Charlottesville.
- Established: 1999
- Location: Charlottesville, Virginia
- Coordinates: 38°01′31″N 78°26′34″W
- Type: Art Museum
- Director: Nici Cumpston OAM
- Website: https://kluge-ruhe.org/

The Kluge-Ruhe Aboriginal Art Collection of the University of Virginia houses one of the finest Indigenous Australian art collections in the world, rivaling many of the collections held in Australia. It is the only museum outside Australia dedicated solely to Indigenous Australian art. The director of the Kluge-Ruhe Aboriginal Art Collection is Nici Cumpston OAM (Barkandji).

The collection includes many important paintings of the Papunya Tula movement and Arnhem Land artists and comprises more than 3600 objects in a variety of media, including bark and acrylic paintings, sculpture, photography, prints and artifacts, most dating from 1940 onward. The museum has two gallery spaces where exhibitions drawn from the collection as well as works on loan are on view. The exhibitions change every 6 months to a year.

The museum is located at Pantops Farm, a university-owned property once owned by Thomas Jefferson in the Pantops neighborhood of Charlottesville, Virginia.

== History ==
=== History of the Kluge-Ruhe Aboriginal Art Collection ===
The Kluge-Ruhe Collection receives its namesake from the two American men who collected the majority of the artwork, media mogul John W. Kluge and English Professor Edward L. Ruhe.

Kluge experienced a powerful visual attraction to Aboriginal art in 1988 when he attended the exhibition, Dreamings: The Art of Aboriginal Australia, at the Asia Society Galleries in New York City. Beginning in 1989, he visited Australia on several occasions, hired curatorial advisers and commissioned or collected more than 600 artworks. In 1993, Kluge seized the opportunity to acquire the collection of the late Edward L. Ruhe (1923–1989). Ruhe was a Professor of English at the University of Kansas who began collecting Aboriginal art in 1965 while in Australia as a Fulbright Visiting Professor. Ruhe was the first person to exhibit a privately owned collection of Aboriginal art in the United States, which toured more than twenty venues between 1966 and 1977. After acquiring Ruhe’s collection, Kluge continued to collect and commission Aboriginal art, and ultimately decided his world-class collection would be best used at a university where it would be available for scholarly research and study. He donated his collection to the University of Virginia in 1997 and the museum opened in its current location in 1999 under founding director Margo Smith AM, who served as director from 1999-2025.

=== History of the building ===
The Kluge-Ruhe Collection's building rests on the land of the Monacan Indian Nation, who lived on and cared for the land and waters of the region. In 1746 Peter Jefferson, father of Thomas Jefferson, purchased land east of Charlottesville that included this location. Thomas Jefferson inherited the land upon his father’s death and named it Pantops, meaning "all-seeing," and sold the property in 1815. In 1938, James Cheek of Nashville bought the property and hired master architect Benjamin Charles Baker to build the current colonial revival style house. It changed ownership several times until Eugene and Ann Worrell gave the building back to the University in 1998 to support its academic mission.

== Mission ==
The Kluge-Ruhe Collection aims to expand knowledge and understanding of Indigenous Australian art and culture to cultivate greater appreciation of human diversity and creativity. One of its core institutional priorities is to build and sustain collaborative relationships to deepen their impact and extend their reach with the Indigenous people of Australia. This includes hosting more than 20 Indigenous knowledge holders each year. Because the museum is located across the world from the people whose art they showcase, the museum values the role of Indigenous artist and leaders as authorities on their art and culture. Past visiting artists include Judy Watson, Reko Rennie, Nici Cumpston, Djambawa Marawili, Vernon Ah Kee, David Bosun, Ricardo Idagi, Janet Fieldhouse, Yhonnie Scarce, Jason Wing, Ricky Maynard, James Tylor, Jenni Kemarre Martiniello, Carol McGregor, Kent Morris, Raymond Bulambula, Mrs Gorriyindi, and many others. The residency program has been funded by the Australia Council for the Arts since 2012.

== See also ==
- Indigenous Australian art
- Papunya Tula

== Sources ==
Kluge-Ruhe Museum at the University of Virginia The Kluge-Ruhe Aboriginal Art Collection at the University of Virginia
