= Yunupingu =

Yunupingu, more correctly spelt Yunupiŋu, is the family name of a number of notable Aboriginal Australians from the Yolŋu people, of Arnhem Land of the Gumatj clan. People with this name are closely connected with the Marika and Gurruwiwi families.

Notable people with this name include:

- Eunice Djerrkngu Yunupingu (c.1945–2022), artist, mother of Witiyana Marika
- Galarrwuy Yunupingu (1948–2023), Australian leader in the struggle for Australian land rights, also known as Dr Yunupingu
- Gulumbu Yunupingu (1940s–2012), Australian artist and women's leader
- Geoffrey Gurrumul Yunupingu (1971–2017), aka Gurrumul, Australian multi-instrumentalist and singer in Yolngu and English, also known as Dr G. Yunupingu
- Malngay Yunupingu, band member of rock/reggae band East Journey
- Mandawuy Yunupingu (1956–2013), Australian musician, educator and community leader, also known as Dr Yunupingu
- Nancy Gaymala Yunupingu (c.1935–2005), artist
- Nyapanyapa Yunupingu (born c.1945), Australian painter
- Mungurrawuy Yunupingu (c.1905–1979), Gumatj leader, father of Galarrwuy, Gaymala, Gulumbu, Mandawuy, Nyapanyapa, and others
- Yirrnga Yunupingu, singer/songwriter of King Stingray, and former vocalist with Yothu Yindi (son of Gurrumul)
- Yalmay Marika Yunupingu (born 1956), artist and teacher-linguist at Yirrkala Community Education Centre (daughter of Mathaman Marika)

== See also ==
- Commonwealth v Yunupingu
- Dr Yunupingu (disambiguation)
