= Andrew Gurruwiwi =

Australian musician

- Born: Andrew Minyapa Gurruwiwi c. 1970; Northern Territory, Australia
- Relatives: Djalu Gurruwiwi (father)

Andrew Gurruwiwi is a Yolngu musician and radio broadcaster from Arnhem Land in the Northern Territory of Australia. He is a Galpu man and the band leader of the Andrew Gurruwiwi Band.

== Life ==
Andrew Gurruwiwi's father is Djalu Gurruwiwi

Following an accident in 1998, Gurruwiwi lost his eyesight.

Andrew featured on recordings with his father Djalu.

== Career ==
Andrew and brother Larry led the Bärra West Wind band, with Jason Guwanbal Gurruwiwi, Vernon Marritŋu Gurruwiwi, Dion Marimunuk Gurruwiwi, and Adrian Guyundu Gurruwiwi also listed as members of the band in 2010. The band released three studio albums between 2010 and 2020.

In 2020, Gurruwiwi formed Andrew Gurruwiwi Band and released their debut single "Gatjumak" ("Go for It" in Yolngu Matha) in March 2022.

In June 2021, they played at the Yarrapay Festival, at Buku-Larrnggay Mulka Art Centre in Yirrkala, along with Yothu Yindi, East Journey, and Yirrmal.

Their debut album Sing Your Own Song was released in July 2024.

On 17 June 2026 it was announced that five episodes of the popular children's TV program Bluey had been translated into Yolŋu Matha. Andrew Gurruwiwi provides the voice of Bluey's Grandad in the translated episodes, which will be released at the beginning of NAIDOC Week on 5 July 2026 on ABC iview, and will screen at the Garma Festival in August 2026.

== Discography ==
=== Albums ===
List of albums, with selected details
Title	Details
Sing Your Own Song (as Andrew Gurruwiwi Band)	Released: 5 July 2024; Format: CD, LP, digital; Label: Andrew Gurruwiwi (AGB001)

== Awards and nominations ==
=== National Indigenous Music Awards ===
The National Indigenous Music Awards recognise excellence, innovation and leadership among Aboriginal and Torres Strait Islander musicians from throughout Australia. They commenced in 2004.

Year	Nominee / work	Award	Result	Ref.
2024	Andrew Gurruwiwi Band	Best New Talent of the Year	Nominated	
2024	"Yaa Djamarrkuli"	Film Clip of the Year	Nominated	
2025	Andrew Gurruwiwi Band	Best New Talent of the Year	Won	
2025	Sing Your Own Song	Album of the Year	Nominated	
2025	"Wata Mäwi"	Film Clip of the Year	Nominated	
2025	"Once Upon a Time"	Song of the Year	Won	

== See also ==
- List of didgeridoo players
- Gurruwiwi
