= Acacia sublanata =

Scientific classification
- Kingdom: Plantae
- Clade: Tracheophytes
- Clade: Angiosperms
- Clade: Eudicots
- Clade: Rosids
- Order: Fabales
- Family: Fabaceae
- Subfamily: Caesalpinioideae
- Clade: Mimosoid clade
- Genus: Acacia
- Species: A. sublanata

Binomial name
- Acacia sublanata Benth.
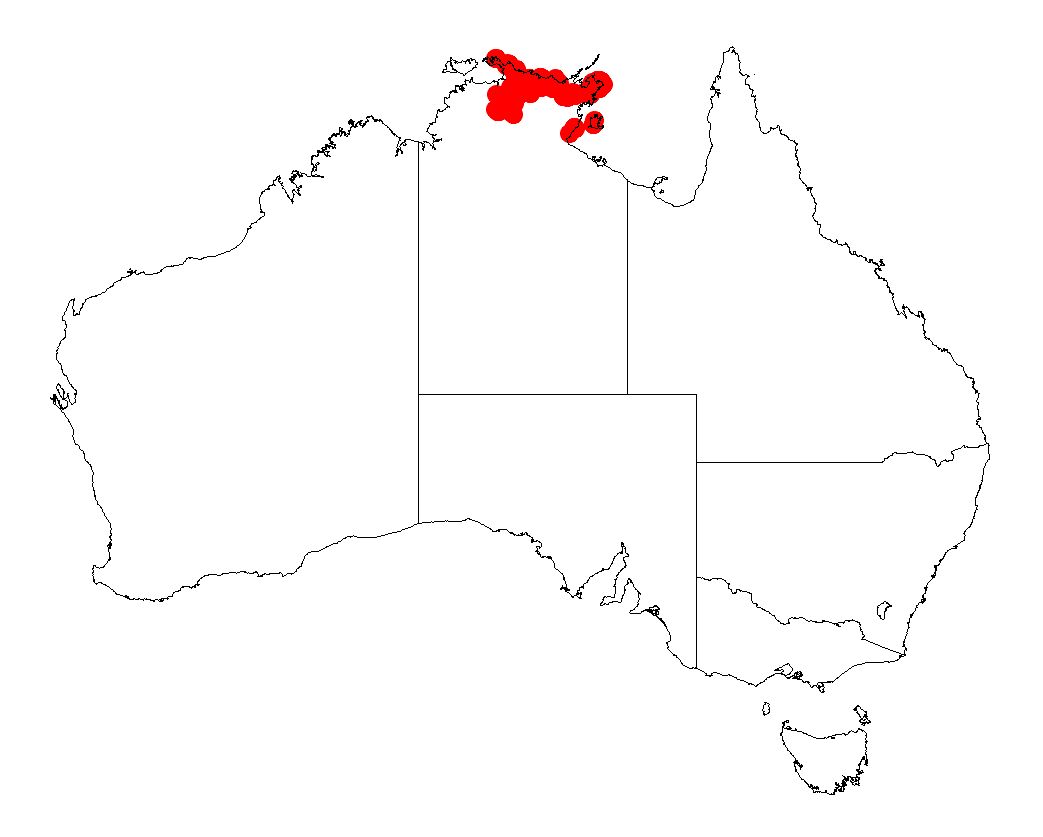
- Occurrence data from AVH

Species of legume

Acacia sublanata is a shrub of the genus Acacia and the subgenus Plurinerves that is endemic to an area of northern Australia.

== Description ==
The shrub typically grows to a height of 0.4 to 3 m (1 ft 4 in to 9 ft 10 in) and has an erect to semi-prostrate habit with hairy striated branchlets with persistent stipules that have a linear-lanceolate shape. Like most species of Acacia it has phyllodes rather than true leaves. The thinly leathery grey-green phyllodes have an inequilaterally broadly obdeltate shape with a length of 4 to 15 mm (0.16 to 0.59 in) and a width of about the same and also have two to four raised nerves. When it blooms it produces simple inflorescences with spherical to sometimes obloid shaped flower-heads that have a diameter of 5 to 6 mm (0.20 to 0.24 in) and a length to around 8 m (26 ft) containing 30 golden coloured flowers. Following flowering it forms hairy and crustaceous seed pods that have a linear shape but are raised and constricted between seeds and can be as long as 14 cm (5.5 in) with a width of 3 to 6 mm (0.12 to 0.24 in). The glossy black seeds inside the pods have an oblong shape with a length of 5 to 8 mm (0.20 to 0.31 in) and a terminal aril.

== Taxonomy ==
The species was first formally described by the botanist George Bentham in 1837 as part of the work Leguminosae. Enumeratio plantarum quas in Novae Hollandiae ora austro-occidentali ad fluvium Cygnorum et in Sinu Regis Georgii collegit Carolus liber baro de Hügel. It was reclassified by Leslie Pedley in 1987 as Racosperma sublanatum then transferred back to genus Acacia in 2001.

== Distribution ==
It is native to an area in the top end of the Northern Territory from around the upper South Alligator River and East Alligator Rivers in the west across to the Groote Eylandt and the Gove Peninsula in the east and is often a part of woodland communities growing in areas of sandstone.

== See also ==
- List of Acacia species
