= Gurruwiwi =

Gurruwiwi is a surname of the Yolngu, an Aboriginal Australian people of Arnhem Land, Northern Territory of Australia, and family members have close connections with the Yunupingu and Marika families.

Notable people with the surname include:

- Andrew Gurruwiwi, musician, son of Djalu
- Djalu Gurruwiwi (c.1935–2022), yidaki player
- Gali Yalkarriwuy Gurruwiwi (1942–2020), artist
- Larry Gurruwiwi, musician, son of Djalu
- Leila Gurruwiwi (born 1988), media commentator and TV producer
- Mithinarri Gurruwiwi (1929–1976), artist
- Yimila Gurruwiwi, yidaki player and singer in King Stingray
