= Dr Yunupingu =

Dr Yunupingu may refer to:

- Galarrwuy Yunupingu (1948–2023), Australian leader in the struggle for Indigenous land rights in Australia
- Geoffrey Gurrumul Yunupingu (1971–2017), aka Gurrumul, Australian multi-instrumentalist and singer
- Mandawuy Yunupingu (1956–2013), Australian musician, educator and community leader

== See also ==
- Commonwealth v Yunupingu
- Dr Yunupingu Award for Human Rights, one of three awards at the National Indigenous Human Rights Awards, named for Mandawuy Yunupingu
