= National Indigenous Music Awards 2015 =

Annual Australian music awards ceremony

- Date: 22 July 2015
- Venue: The Amphitheatre Botanical Gardens, Northern Territory, Australia
- Hosted by: Malarndirri McCarthy and Kamahi Djordon King

Highlights
- Most wins: Briggs (2)
- Most nominations: Briggs (5)
- Website: nima.musicnt.com.au

Television/radio coverage
- Network: National Indigenous Television

The National Indigenous Music Awards 2015 were the 12th annual National Indigenous Music Awards.

The nominations were announced on 10 July 2015 and the awards ceremony was held on 22 July 2015.

For the first time in National Indigenous Music Awards history two artists were awarded the Artist of the Year prize; Jessica Mauboy and Dan Sultan. An equal number of votes came in from the voting panel for each artist and the decision was made to honor both parties with this prestigious national award.

Executive Director of MusicNT & NIMA, Mark Smith, said "This year's finalists offer a diverse breath of fresh air within the mainstream music industry. They integrate a rich cultural heritage that illustrates an intimate connection to place and a respect for environment that resonates with the wider community. NIMAs is fast becoming known as the best event in the country for cross-cultural engagement; this is something we can all be very proud of".

== Performers ==
- Gurrumul
- East Journey featuring Yothu Yindi
- Frank Yamma
- B2M
- The Painted Ladies
- Blekbala Mujik
- Yirrmal
- Zane Francis

== Hall of Fame Inductee ==
- Vic Simms and Blekbala Mujik

== Triple J Unearthed National Indigenous Winner ==
- Zane Francis

Zane Francis is a young electronic/indie artist from Tweed Heads/Coolangatta. Francis uploaded his debut single "Acclimate" in January 2015. Triple J Music Director Dave Ruby Howe said "While the song only lasts for a shade over two minutes, they're nonetheless breathtaking with Zane's rich voice packing a devastatingly powerful emotional punch that grips your ears from the first listen and doesn't let go."

== Awards ==
Artist of the Year

Artist	Result
Jessica Mauboy	Won
Thelma Plum	Nominated
Dan Sultan	Won
Briggs	Nominated

New Talent of the Year

Artist	Result
Philly	Won
Lucky Luke	Nominated
Tjintu Desert Band	Nominated

Album of the Year

Artist and album	Result
Briggs - Sheplife	Won
Emma Donovan and Putbacks - Dawn	Nominated
Frank Yamma - Uncle	Nominated
East Journey - The Genesis Project	Nominated

Film Clip of the Year

Artist and song	Result
Briggs – "Bad Apples"	Won
East Journey - "Song of Arnhem Land"	Nominated
Radical Son - "Human Behaviour	Nominated
Dan Sultan - "Dirty Ground"	Nominated
B2M (Bathurst to Melville) - "Parlingarri"	Nominated

Song of the Year

Artist and song	Result
Thelma Plum – "How Much Does Your Love Cost?"	Won
Thelma Plum - "Young in Love"	Nominated
Briggs - "Bad Apples"	Nominated
Dan Sultan - "Dirty Ground"	Nominated
Emma Donovan - "Black Womant"	Nominated

Cover Art of the Year

Artist and album	Result
East Journey - "Song of Arnhem Land"	Nominated
Radical Son - Cause n Affect	Won
Frank Yamma - Uncle	Nominated
Briggs - Sheplife	Nominated

Traditional Song of the Year

Artist and song	Result
Djalu Gurruwiwi and East Journey – "Mokuy & Bonba"	Won

School Band of the Year

Artist and song	Result
The Karungkarni Band	Won

Community Clip of the Year

Artist and song	Result
Katherine West Health Board and Bulla Camp - "Breath In, Breath Out"	Nominated
Yarn Safe - "Got a lot Going On"	Nominated
Uncle Alfred's Mens Group - "Spear of Destiny"	Nominated
Cairns Murri Crew - "Built To Last"	Won
Tagai Buway - "Two Worlds"	Nominated
Broome Regional Aboriginal Medical Service and St. Mary's College - "Call On Me"	Nominated
