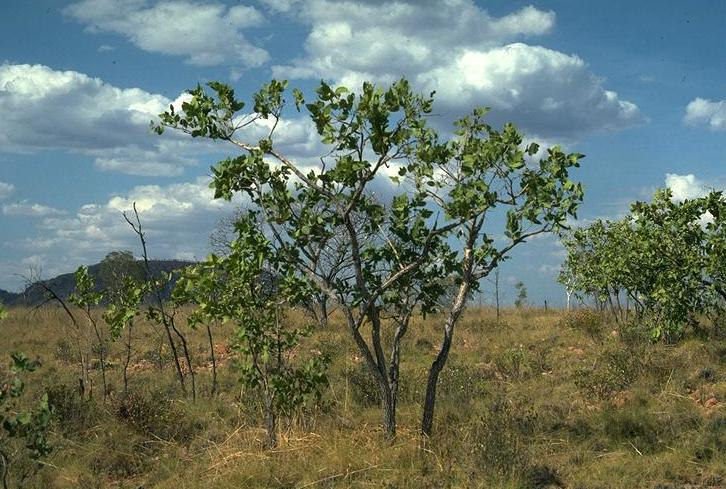
- Corymbia abbreviata near the Gibb River Road

Conservation status
- Least Concern (IUCN 3.1)

Scientific classification
- Kingdom: Plantae
- Clade: Tracheophytes
- Clade: Angiosperms
- Clade: Eudicots
- Clade: Rosids
- Order: Myrtales
- Family: Myrtaceae
- Genus: Corymbia
- Species: C. abbreviata

Binomial name
- Corymbia abbreviata (Blakely & Jacobs) K.D.Hill & L.A.S.Johnson

Synonyms
- Eucalyptus abbreviata Blakely & Jacobs

= Corymbia abbreviata =

Scraggy bloodwood

Species of plant

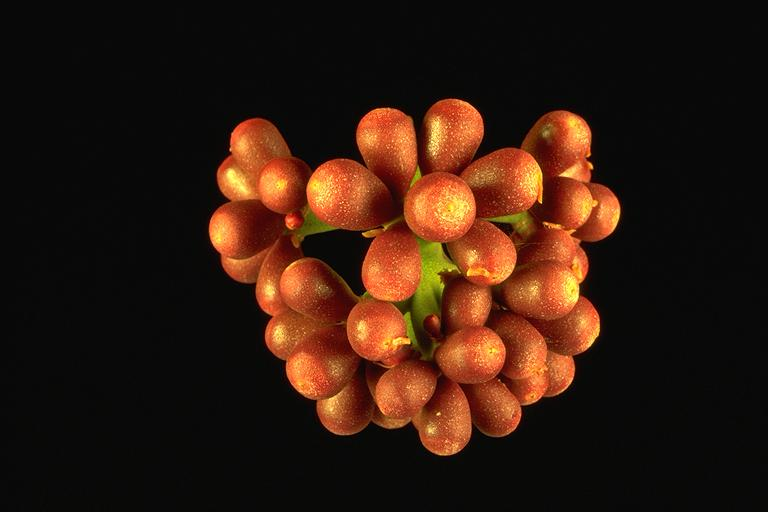
flower buds

Corymbia abbreviata, also known as scraggy bloodwood, is a species of straggly tree that is native to Western Australia and the Northern Territory. It has rough bark, a crown of stiff leaves arranged in opposite pairs, flower buds usually in crowded groups on the ends of branchlets and urn-shaped fruit.

== Description ==
Corymbia abbreviata is a straggly tree or shrub that typically grows to a height of 2.1 to 6 metres (7 to 20 ft) and forms a lignotuber. It has tessellated, flaky, grey-brown over red-brown bark. The branchlets are silvery to green, smooth, glabrous and lack oil glands in the pith. Young plants and coppice regrowth have sessile, stem-clasping, heart-shaped leaves, 150–230 mm (5.9–9.1 in) long, 80–150 mm (3.1–5.9 in) wide and arranged in opposite pairs. The crown has adult leaves that are similar to the juvenile leaves, heart-shaped to broadly lance-shaped, 70–235 mm (2.8–9.3 in) long, 30–110 mm (1.2–4.3 in) wide with the base stem-clasping or lobed. The flower buds are mostly arranged on the ends of branchlets on a branched peduncle 3–18 mm (0.12–0.71 in) long, each branch usually with seven buds, the buds sessile or on pedicels up to 3 mm (0.12 in) long. Mature buds are oval to pear-shaped, 11–16 mm (0.43–0.63 in) long and 9–12 mm (0.35–0.47 in) wide with a rounded operculum. Flowering occurs between July and January and the flowers are creamy white. The fruit is a smooth, woody, urn-shaped capsule 20–35 mm (0.79–1.38 in) long and 17–30 mm (0.67–1.18 in) wide with a conspicuous neck and the valves enclosed.

== Taxonomy and naming ==
Scraggy bloodwood was first formally described in 1934 by William Blakely and Maxwell Jacobs and given the name Eucalyptus abbreviata, in Blakely's book A Key to the Eucalypts. In 1995, Ken Hill and Lawrie Johnson changed the name to Corymbia abbreviata. The specific epithet (abbreviata) is from the Latin word abbreviatus meaning "shortened" referring to the flower heads.

== Distribution and habitat ==
Corymbia abbreviata has a scattered distribution extending from Wyndham and Karunji in the Kimberley region of Western Australia and east as far as Dorisvale and Willeroo in the Northern Territory. The distribution of C. abbreviata coincides with C. ferruginea. It grows in skeletal soils, on stony slopes, ridges and outcrops of sandstone, granite or quartzite.

== See also ==
- List of Corymbia species
