= Galarrwuy Yunupingu =

Aboriginal Australian activist (1948–2023)

Galarrwuy Yunupingu AC
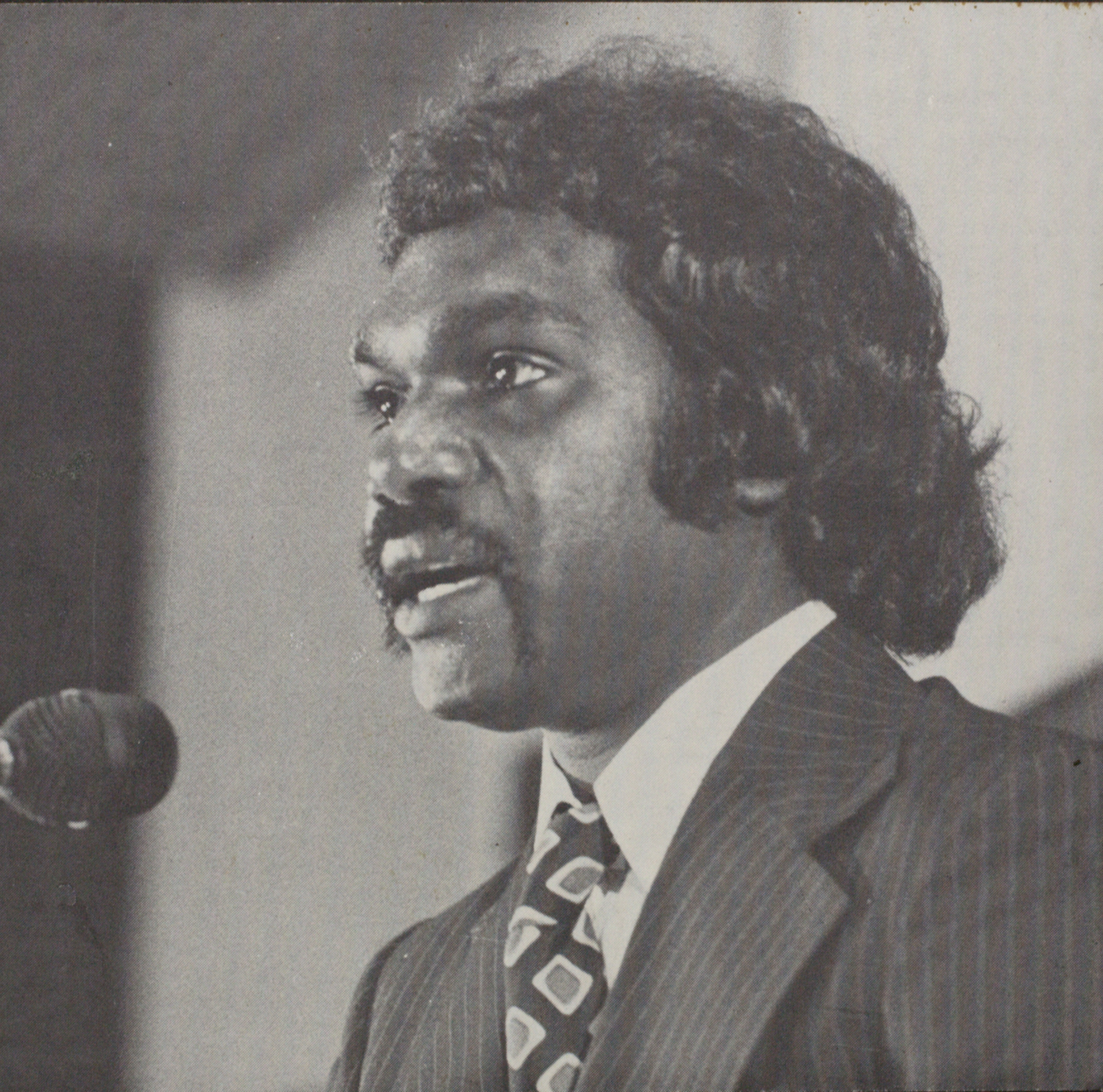
- Yunupingu in 1977
- Born: 30 June 1948; Gunyangura, Melville Bay, Northern Territory, Australia
- Died: 3 April 2023 (aged 74); Northern Territory
- Known for: Indigenous rights activism, leadership, art, music
- Movement: Aboriginal land rights in Australia
- Father: Mungurrawuy Yunupingu
- Relatives: Mandawuy Yunupingu (brother); Nyapanyapa Yunupingu (sister); Nancy Gaymala Yunupingu (sister); Geoffrey Gurrumul Yunupingu; Djalu Gurruwiwi (brother-in-law)
- Awards: Australian of the Year (1978); Member of the Order of Australia (1985)

Galarrwuy Yunupingu (30 June 1948 – 3 April 2023), also known as James Galarrwuy Yunupingu and Dr Yunupingu, was an Indigenous Australian activist who was a leader in the Aboriginal Australian community. He was involved in Indigenous land rights throughout his career. He was a Yolngu man of the Gumatj clan, from Arnhem Land in the Northern Territory. He was the 1978 Australian of the Year.

== Early life and education ==
Galarrwuy Yunupingu was born at Melville Bay, near Yirrkala, on 30 June 1948, and was a member of the Gumatj clan of the Yolngu people. His father, Mungurrawuy Yunupingu, was a well-known artist and leader of his clan; siblings included lead singer of Yothu Yindi, his brother Mandawuy Yunupingu; and several artist sisters, including Nyapanyapa Yunupingu and Nancy Gaymala Yunupingu.

He grew up on Yirrkala mission, where he was known to balanda (non-Indigenous people) as "James", and attended the Mission School in his formative years. He was a teenager at the time the Yirrkala bark petitions were created at the mission and submitted to the Australian Parliament in 1963, eventually leading to the 1971 Gove land rights case, and took an interest in the proceedings. He was noted as a bright student.

The Methodist missionaries saw potential in him as a future clergyman, and with their support, he moved to Brisbane to study at the Methodist Bible College for two years, returning to Gove in 1967.

== Career ==
=== Land rights ===
In the early 1960s, with his father, Gumatj clan leader Mungurrawuy, Yunupingu entered the struggle for land rights and helped draw up the Yirrkala bark petitions, which his father helped to paint. He came to national attention in the late 1960s for his role in the landmark, but unsuccessful Gove Land Rights Case. This legal action was the first by Indigenous Australians to challenge mining companies' rights to exploit traditional lands. He became a prominent leader and strong voice on behalf of Aboriginal people in the Northern Territory and Australia, gaining the respect and admiration from many.

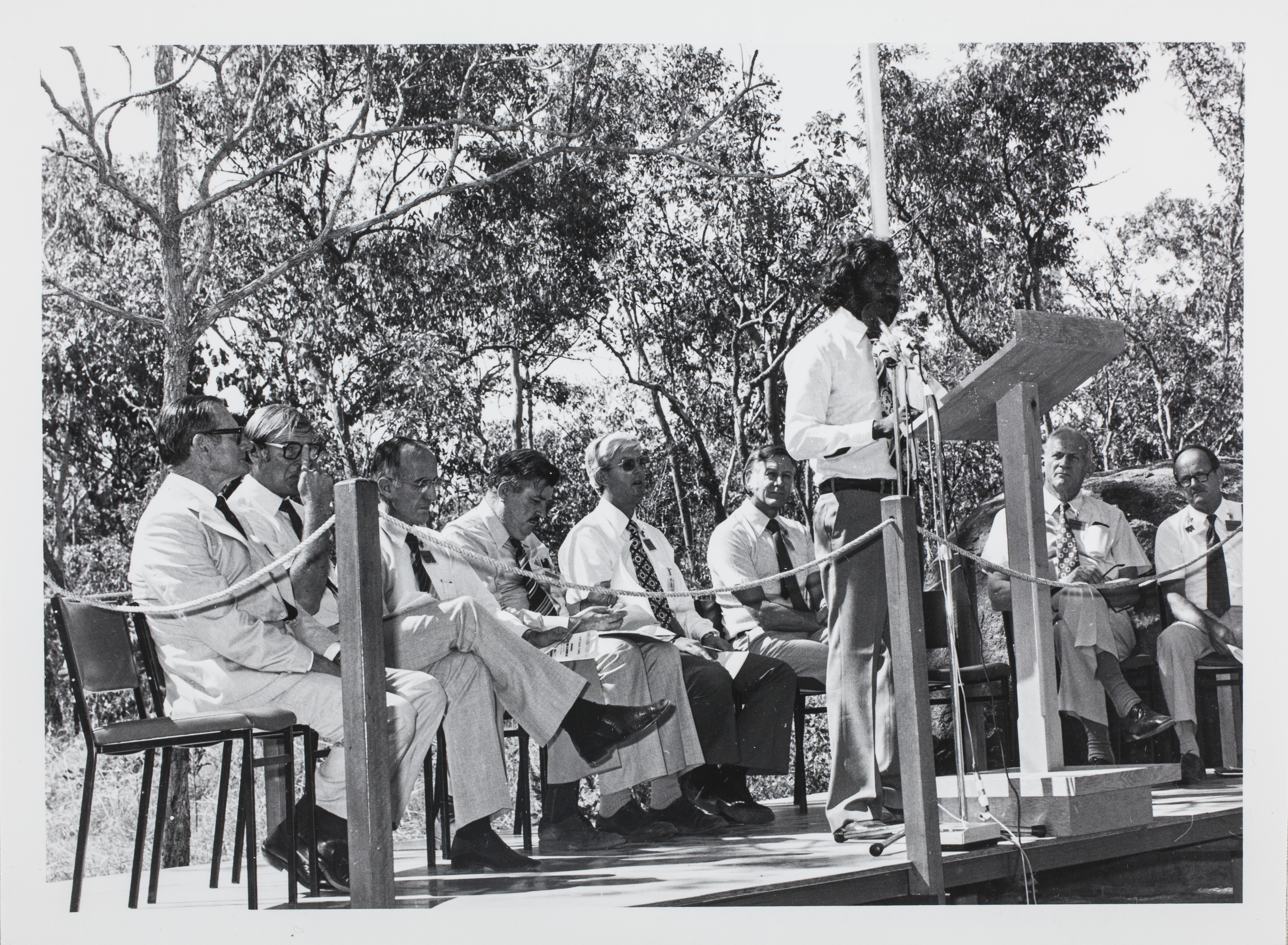
Yunupingu speaking at opening of Ranger Uranium Mine

In 1975, Yunupingu joined the Northern Land Council (NLC), the authority appointed under the Aboriginal Land Rights Act 1976 to represent traditional Aboriginal landowners and Aboriginal people. He was chairman of the NLC from 1977 to 1980, an executive member until 1983 when he was re-elected as chairman. He has led a number of negotiations with mining and government bodies.

In 1988, Yunupingu and Wenten Rubuntja presented prime minister Bob Hawke, who was on a visit to the Northern Territory as part of Bicentennial celebrations, with a statement of Aboriginal political objectives, painted on a 1.2-square-metre (13 sq ft) sheet of composite wood. This became known as the "Barunga Statement". Hawke responded by saying that he wished to conclude a treaty between Aboriginal and other Australians by 1990. In June 1991 the Aboriginal band, Yothu Yindi, whose lead singer was Yunupingu's younger brother Mandawuy Yunupingu, wrote and released the hit song "Treaty" to commemorate the Barunga statement. The brothers and the band wanted to highlight the lack of progress on the treaty between Aboriginal peoples and the federal government.

As chair of the NLC, Yunupingu led the Gagudju people in negotiations with mining and government bodies. Not opposed to mining in principle, Yunupingu saw it as a way for Aboriginal people to escape the welfare trap if it is conducted on the traditional owners' terms. These include a fair distribution of the economic benefits and respect for the land and specific sacred sites. He said: "We will continue to fight for the right to make our own decisions about our own land".

In later life, he supplied the title for historian Clare Wright's 2024 award-winning work about the Yirrkala bark petitions, Näku Dhäruk: The Bark Petitions, Näku Dhäruk being the local Yolngu Matha translation of "bark petitions".

=== Later career ===
In October 2004, Yunupingu resigned from his position as chair of the NLC after 23 years in the role and around 28 as a member of the council. In June 2005 The Weekend Australian, based on information provided by his son and other relatives, reported that there was some discontent among the Yunupingu family and other community members about the distribution of mining royalties paid to the Gumatj Association.

In 2007 Yunupingu spoke about the need for action in reducing Indigenous poverty. In reference to the Howard government's Northern Territory National Emergency Response, known as "The Intervention", he said "The intervention was an incomplete process about which he would reserve his judgement until he knew what was working and what wasn't". In 2009 he spoke out against the inability of the government to provide adequate housing.

As of early 2009, he continued to live near Yirrkala, fulfilling his role as a senior ceremonial leader and community elder. He still held numerous positions on committees and organisations where he was able to share his wide experience with other Australians and promote the aspirations of his people.

Yunupingu was a member of the Referendum Council set up in 2015, which led to the Uluru Statement from the Heart in 2017. In November 2019, it was announced that Yunupingu would be one of 20 members of the Senior Advisory Group to help co-design the Indigenous voice to government set up by Ken Wyatt, the Minister for Indigenous Australians. The Group was co-chaired by Wyatt, Marcia Langton and Tom Calma.

In 2019, Yunupingu brought a native title claim against the Australian Government on behalf of the Gumatj peoples of the Northern Territory. He sought financial compensation over the Government's acquisition of land on the Gove Peninsula, obtained without the consent of the traditional owners, for the purpose of granting bauxite mines. The Full Court of the Federal Court of Australia ruled in favour of the Gumatj people in 2023, finding that their land was not acquired "on just terms" before being leased to mining consortium Nabalco in 1968. This decision was upheld on appeal by the High Court of Australia in March 2025.

== Music ==
Yunupingu loved music and helped to guide his brother's band, Yothu Yindi, sometimes singing traditional elements of the band's songs. He also painted their album covers.

In the early 1970s, Yunupingu sang a song written by Ted Egan, called "Gurindji Blues", about the struggles of the land rights movement in the NT at the time. Released on RCA Victor in 1971, the single features Vincent Lingiari of Gurindji strike fame, who introduces the recording in Gurindji, followed by a translation into English. Yunupingu also sings on the B side of the record.

== Health and death ==
In January 2010 he spent time in hospital after collapsing in a bank in Nhulunbuy. In late 2016, he had a kidney transplant.

Yunupingu died in the Northern Territory on 3 April 2023, at age 74, after a long illness. The Yothu Yindi Foundation described him as "a giant of the nation".

He was survived by two of his four wives, 12 children, including daughter Binmila, and many grand- and great-grandchildren. A statement signed by Binmila announcing his death, along with a recording of Yunupingu leading traditional song, was posted on the Yothu Yindi Foundation website, saying that ceremonies would be conducted in North Eastern Arnhem Land in coming weeks. It requested that only the name Yunupingu be used to refer to him, and only the images provided by the YYF should be used. The statement included the words:

We remember him for his fierce leadership, and total strength for Yolŋu and for Aboriginal people throughout Australia. He lived by our laws always. Yunupiŋu lived his entire life on his land, surrounded by the sound of bilma (clapsticks), yidaki (didgeridoo) and the manikay (sacred song) and dhulang (sacred designs) of our people. He was born on our land, he lived all his life on our land and he died on our land secure in the knowledge that his life's work was secure.

== Recognition ==
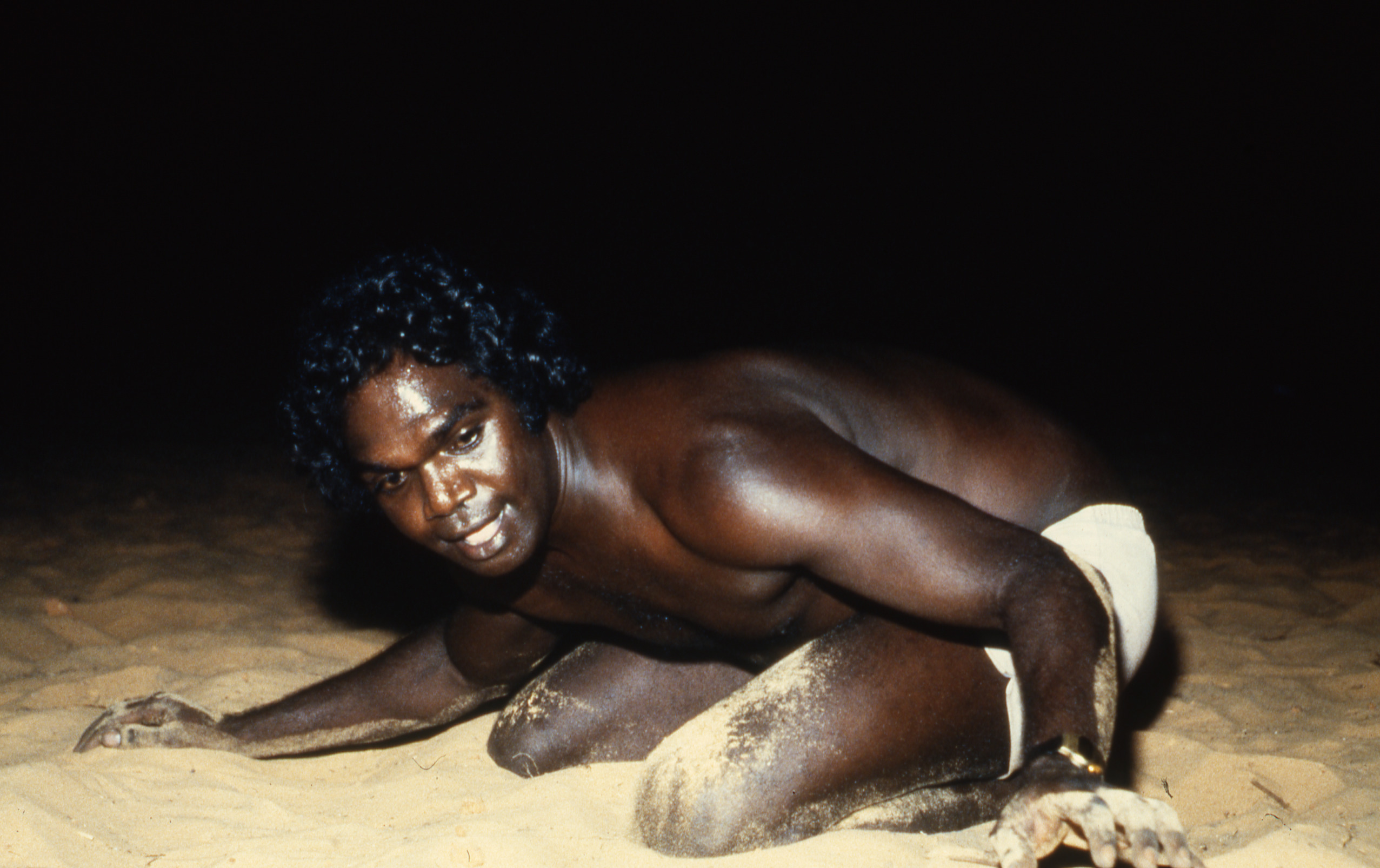
Yunupingu in 1978

In 1978 Yunupingu was named Australian of the Year for his negotiations on the Ranger uranium mine agreement. He said the award 'would help him to shake off the image of ratbag and radical' and would give him "greater strength as an individual and as a leader". He also said it was a recognition for Aboriginal people as "the indigenous people of this country who must share in its future".

In the Australia Day Honours in 1985, James Galarrwuy Yunupingu was made a Member of the Order of Australia (AM) for his services to the Aboriginal community. He was posthumously promoted to Companion (AC) in the 2025 Australia Day Honours.

In 1998 Yunupingu was added to the list of 100 "Australian Living National Treasures" selected by the National Trust of Australia as leaders in society "considered to have a great influence over our environment because of the standards and examples they set".

In 2015, at the Garma Festival, he was honoured by the University of Melbourne with an Honorary Doctor of Laws (LL.D.). In a statement, Professor Margaret Sheil, Provost at the University of Melbourne, said the Honorary Doctor of Laws award to Yunupingu was to recognise and celebrate the significance of his work for Indigenous rights.

Yunupingu was one of three Indigenous Australians, along with Tom Calma and Lowitja O'Donoghue, honoured by Australia Post in the 2017 Legends Commemorative Stamp "Indigenous leaders" series to mark the 50th anniversary of the 1967 referendum.

== See also ==
- Yunupingu (for other members of the family)
