= List of didgeridoo players =

This is a list of notable musicians who play the Australian instrument known as the didgeridoo.

== Australia ==
Aboriginal Australian players from traditional didgeridoo regions (according to A. P. Elkin, in 1938 the instrument was "only known in eastern Kimberley and the northern third of the Northern Territory",) belonging to clans that claim the didgeridoo as part of their ancient ancestral heritage:

- David Blanasi
- Ash Dargan
- Djalu Gurruwiwi

Aboriginal players from non-traditional didgeridoo regions:

- Mark Atkins
- William Barton
- Adrian Burragubba
- Alan Dargin
- Ernie Dingo
- David Hudson
- David Williams

Non-Aboriginal Australian didgeridoo players:

- Anthony Field
- Rolf Harris
- Charlie McMahon
- Adam Plack
- Xavier Rudd

== United States ==
- Stuart Dempster
- Stephen Kent
- Steve Roach
- Graham Wiggins
- Mandela van Eeden

== Performers who use the didgeridoo as a secondary instrument ==
A number of didgeridoo players are jazz or classical trombonists (or, alternatively, players of other wind or string instruments) who double on the didgeridoo, using it as a secondary instrument. These include:

- Art Baron
- Brandon Boyd
- John Butler
- Douglas Ewart
- Wycliffe Gordon
- Like a Storm
- Christian Lindberg
- Brendon Urie
- Peter Zummo
