= P. J. Magennis Pty. Ltd. v Commonwealth =

Judgement of the High Court of Australia

- Court: High Court of Australia
- Full case name: P. J. Magennis Property Limited v. The Commonwealth
- Decided: 21 December 1949
- Citations: [1949] HCA 66, (1949) 80 CLR 382

Court membership
- Judges sitting: Latham CJ, Rich, Dixon, McTiernan, Williams and Webb JJ

Case opinions
- (4:2) The law is invalid as an acquisition of property other than on just terms (per Latham CJ, Rich, Williams & Webb JJ; Dixon & McTiernan dissenting)

P. J. Magennis Pty. Ltd. v Commonwealth, is a High Court of Australia case that deals with the Commonwealth's power of acquisition of property, which must be on just terms, as specified in section 51(xxxi) of the Constitution.

The Commonwealth government wished to purchase land for resettlement after World War II. Because the States are not required to acquire property on just terms, the Commonwealth government entered into a deal with the New South Wales government, which would purchase the land for a lower price. The Commonwealth government would then pay the New South Wales government in the form of a grant (section 96).

The majority characterised the law as being one of acquiring real property, instead of the grants power.

Consequently, the law was amended to remove references to the acquisition of property. The validity of a grant in the absence of a requirement to acquire property was upheld in the later case of Pye v. Renshaw.

== See also ==
- Section 51 of the Australian Constitution
- Australian constitutional law
