= Section 51(xxxi) of the Australian Constitution =

Section 51(xxxi) is a subclause of section 51 of the Constitution of Australia. It empowers the Commonwealth to make laws regarding the acquisition of property, but stipulates that such acquisitions must be on just (fair) terms. The subclause is sometimes referred to in shorthand as the 'just terms' provision.

Aside from its importance to Australian constitutional law and property law, the section is notable for its role as a plot device in the Australian film The Castle.

== Text ==
Section 51(xxxi) reads:

s.51 The Parliament shall, subject to this Constitution, have power to make laws for the peace, order, and good government of the Commonwealth with respect to:

...
(xxxi) the acquisition of property on just terms from any State or person for any purpose in respect of which the Parliament has power to make laws;
...

== Jurisprudence ==
While s51(xxxi) was adapted from the US Constitution's Fifth Amendment, it has many differences.

The 'just terms' requirement has been held not to affect the state parliaments.

In Grace Bros Pty Ltd v The Commonwealth (1946), Justice Dixon stated that the inclusion of the condition was to "prevent arbitrary exercises of the power at the expense of a State or a subject."

The interpretation of the terms "acquisition" and "just terms" by the High Court of Australia has had the effect, however, of limiting its protection of property rights. Moreover, it operates at any time the Commonwealth makes a compulsory acquisition of property. As such, it is a contingent guarantee rather than a general constitutional right or freedom to enjoy property rights.

The Commonwealth may only acquire property on just terms for a "purpose in respect of which the Parliament has power to make laws".

=== Property ===
The High Court of Australia has taken a wide view of the concept of "property". Several members of the court took the opportunity to consider the meaning of the term property in Minister of State for the Army v Dalziel (1944). Justice Starke said the term includes: "every species of valuable right and interest including real and personal property, incorporeal hereditaments such as rents and services, rights-of-way, rights of profit or use in land of another, and choses in action. Justice McTiernan confirmed the term property extends to tangible and intangible property.

An example of the breadth of the concept of property in section 51(xxxi) is provided by Bank of New South Wales v Commonwealth (the Bank Nationalisation Case). In that case, federal legislation contemplated the acquisition of private banks through the vesting of shares in private banks in the Commonwealth, and later the appointment of directors by the Governor of the Commonwealth Bank. Justice Dixon characterised the provisions as removing effective control over the property of the private banks. He concluded that this was, in the essential sense, an acquisition of a proprietary right. In Commonwealth v Yunupingu (2025), the majority judgment of the High Court cited the Bank Nationalisation case when confirming that native title is considered property, and therefore subject to compensation 'on just terms' in the case of compulsory acquisition.

While statutory licences have sometimes been equated with proprietary interests, the removal of rights enjoyed under a statutory licence does not typically constitute an acquisition of property within section 51(xxxi), as licence conditions are inherently susceptible to change.

=== Acquisition ===
For the purposes of section 51(xxxi), property must have been acquired by somebody, and the acquisition must be for a Commonwealth purpose. This is in contrast to the Fifth Amendment of the U.S. Constitution, where the destination does not matter – it is enough that the holder of property has been deprived of it. Thus, in JT International SA v Commonwealth, the High Court held that the Commonwealth's plain tobacco packaging laws, which restricted the plaintiff's use of its trademark, did not involve the Commonwealth acquiring any property. Similarly, in Cunningham v Commonwealth, the High Court held that changes to the retiring allowances and life Gold Pass for retired members of Parliament were not an acquisition of property.

In P J Magennis Pty Ltd v Commonwealth the High Court held that a grant to NSW which was tied to NSW compulsorily acquiring property was invalid as an acquisition of property upon terms which were not just. The validity of a grant in the absence of a requirement to acquire property was upheld in the later case of Pye v Renshaw.

=== Just terms ===
Typically, a determination of just terms based on the market value of the property at the time of acquisition will be sufficient to satisfy the requirement of just terms. Unlike the "just compensation" requirement in the American Fifth Amendment, however, "just terms" imports no equivalence of market value. The arrangements offered must be "fair", or such that a legislature could reasonably regard them as "fair". However, this judgment of "fairness" must take account of all the interests affected, not just those of the dispossessed owner.

The requirement of "just terms" does not necessarily require that a compensation package be presented as part of the acquisition scheme. It is sufficient that the scheme provides adequate procedures for determining fair compensation. However, the Court may scrutinise such procedures closely to ensure their adequacy.

There may be some acquisitions of property to which section 51(xxxi) does not apply, such as those made under laws supported exclusively by section 122 of the Constitution.

Section 51(xxxi) is an exception to the norm for interpretation of the subsections of section 51, that one grant of power cannot be used to "read down" another. In this case, however, the Court will not allow another grant of power to be read so broadly as to circumvent the specific limitation to the power granted by section 51(xxxi).

== Related legislation ==
The Deakin government's Lands Acquisition Act 1906, largely drafted by Littleton Groom, was the first to deal with the compulsory acquisition of land by the federal government. Its most contentious provision was a clause authorising the federal government to grant mining leases and regulate mining on Commonwealth land. Responsibility for compulsory acquisition was initially placed with the Department of Home Affairs.

The Chifley government's Darwin Lands Acquisition Act 1945 compulsorily acquired 53 acres (21 ha) of land owned by Chinese-Australians in Darwin, leading to the end of the local Chinatown. The legislation was suggested in 1943 by the Northern Territory's administrator Aubrey Abbott, who proposed a combination of compulsory acquisition and conversion of the land to leasehold in order to effect "the elimination of undesirable elements which Darwin has suffered from far too much in the past" and stated that he hoped to "entirely prevent the Chinese quarter forming again". He further observed that "if land is acquired from the former Chinese residents there is really no need for them to return as they have no other assets". The territory's civilian population had mostly been evacuated during the war and the former Chinatown residents returned to find their homes and businesses reduced to rubble.
