= Ash Dargan =

- Occupation: Musician
- Instrument: Didgeridoo

Ash Dargan is an indigenous Australian didgeridoo player. He is a member of the Larrakia people but did not find out about his aboriginality until he was 21. He teaches and performs all over the world. He is a former member of Coloured Stone, appearing on their 1999 album Rhythm of Nature.

== Discography ==
- Earth Rhythms (1998) Indigenous Australia
- Wirrimbah (1998) Indigenous Australia
- Trancescapes (1998) Indigenous Australia
- Aphrodidjiac (1998) Indigenous Australia
- Tribal Offerings (1998) Indigenous Australia
- Ancient Spirit (1999) Indigenous Australia
- Echoes of Ancient Didjeridu (1999) Indigenous Australia
- Sun Always Dances (1999) Indigenous Australia
- Woomera (1999) Indigenous Australia
- Breath of Man (2000) Indigenous Australia
- Ash Dust & Dirt (2000) Indigenous Australia
- Demurru meditation (2000) Indigenous Australia
- Pharaoh's Dreamtime (2001) Indigenous Australia
- Stick Bones & Song Stones (2001) Indigenous Australia
- Didgeridoo Made Easy – a beginners guide (2001) Indigenous Australia
- Cool Jazz, Hot Didj (2001) Indigenous Australia
- Spirit Dreams (2001) Indigenous Australia
- Rasta (2001) Indigenous Australia
- Kakadu (2002)
- Wild Australia (2002) Indigenous Australia
- Postcard From Ash Dargan (2002) Indigenous Australia
- Territory – 13 Sacred Journeys into Dreamtime (2003) Soundsource Productions
- Stories of Wind (2005) The Orchid
- Very Best of Ash Dargan (2006) Indigenous Australia

With Don Emilio Fernandez De La Vega

- Passions of Flamenco & Didjeridu (1998) Indigenous Australia

With Nigel Pegrum

- Wirrigan (1999) Indigenous Australia

With Coloured Stone

- Rhythm of Nature (1999) CAAMA

With David Hudson

- Indigenous Rhythms 2000, with David Hudson (2000) Sony

With Oscar Serrallach

- Meridian – Ancestral Roots – with Oscar Serrallach (2002) Soundsource Productions

== See also ==
- List of didgeridoo players
