= Pye v Renshaw =

Judgement of the High Court of Australia

- Court: High Court of Australia
- Decided: 8 October 1951
- Citations: [1951] HCA 8, (1951) 84 CLR 58

Court membership
- Judges sitting: Dixon CJ, Williams, Webb, Fullagar, and Kitto JJ

Case opinions
- (5:0) The grant to the state was held to be within power

Pye v Renshaw, is a High Court of Australia case that deals with the interaction between section 51(xxxi) of the Constitution, (the Commonwealth's power to acquire property on just terms) and section 96 of the Constitution (the grants power).

This case followed from P. J. Magennis Pty. Ltd. v. Commonwealth, which held that a Commonwealth law to purchase land via the New South Wales government was invalid. The Commonwealth amended the law, such that the reference to acquisition of land was removed.

The Court held that the law was valid; thus, the Commonwealth was able to get around the restrictions in section 51(xxxi) by ensuring that the law could not be characterised as land acquisition. Hence, section 51(xxxi) does not restrict the section 96 grants power.

== See also ==
- Australian constitutional law
