= Gove Peninsula =

Peninsula in the Northern Territory, Australia

- Coordinates: 12°17′0″S 136°49′0″E
- Country: Australia
- State: Northern Territory

Government
  - Territory electorate: Mulka
  - Federal division: Lingiari

The Gove Peninsula is at the northeastern corner of Arnhem Land in the Northern Territory of Australia. The peninsula became strategically important during World War II when a Royal Australian Air Force base was constructed at what is now Gove Airport. The peninsula was involved in a famous court case known as the Gove land rights case, when local Yolngu people tried to claim native title over their traditional lands in 1971, after the Australian Government had granted a mineral lease to a bauxite mining company without consulting the local peoples. Today the land is owned by the Yolngu people.

== Location ==
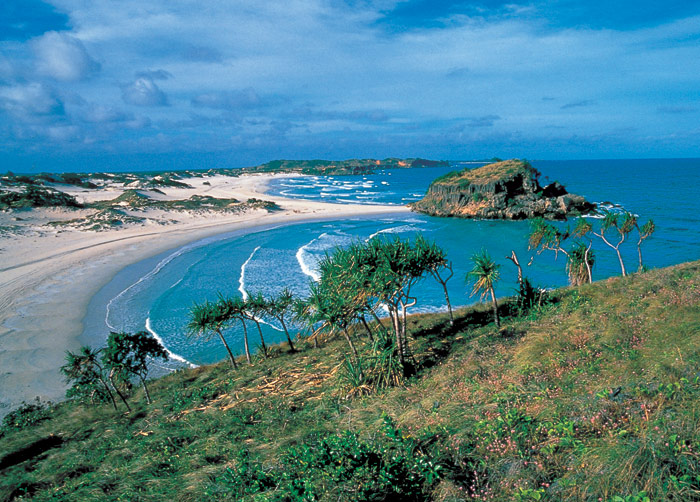
Nanydjaka (Cape Arnhem Coast)

The Gove Peninsula is on the west coast of the Gulf of Carpentaria within Arnhem Land, a vast tract of Aboriginal-owned land on the Northern Territory coastline. The township of Nhulunbuy is the main commercial and service centre of the Peninsula and is 600 kilometres east of Darwin.

== History ==
=== Modern ===
As Europeans started land exploration throughout the Northern Territory and subsequently settled closer to Yolngu homelands, conflicts with the Yolngu became more frequent. In 1931, an area of 96,000 square kilometres (37,000 sq mi) was proclaimed as an Aboriginal reserve, named Arnhem Land Aboriginal Reserve.

Land on the peninsula was famously part of the 1971 Milirrpum v Nabalco Pty Ltd, aka the Gove land rights case, a milestone in the history of Indigenous land rights in Australia. The plaintiffs, elders of various clans of the local Yolngu people, claimed they enjoyed sovereignty over their land, and sought the freedom to occupy their lands. The ruling went against them, as native title in Australia had not yet been recognised, but the principles on which the case were based were overturned in the Mabo case 21 years later.

Today the Land Trust holds about 100,000 square kilometres (39,000 sq mi) as Aboriginal freehold land (with the exception of mining leases).

The Gove Peninsula was heavily involved in the defence of Australia during World War II. Three operational air squadrons were based there at an airfield on the site of the present Gove airport and at a flying boat base at Drimmie Head. The Peninsula derives its name from a RAAF navigator who died in a mid-air collision.

== Geography ==
=== Topography ===
The Gove Peninsula is nearly pristine, apart from Nhulunbuy, along with the bauxite mine and associated alumina refinery which brought the town into existence and closed in 2014. There are savannah woodlands, wetlands, monsoon forests and rocky escarpments stretched across its huge area, as well as many beaches, bays and islands.

Melville Bay (12.25°S 136.70°E) is the large bay between the peninsula and the mainland, and there are many unnamed beaches both within the bay and on the western side of the peninsula, as well as named beaches (such as Ski Beach and Wallaby Beach). Other popular locations around the peninsula include:

- Nanydjaka (Cape Arnhem)
- Lurrupukurru (Oyster Beach)
- Rangura (Caves Beach)
- Baringura (Little Bondi)
- Ngumuy (Turtle Beach)
- Garanhan (Macassan(s) Beach)
- Binydjarrŋa/Daliwuy (Daliwoi) Bay

There are three coastal walking trails: Daliwuy to Garanhan (3-kilometre (1.9 mi)), Garanhan to Ngumuy (2.5-kilometre (1.6 mi)) and Ngumuy to Baringura (1.5-kilometre (0.93 mi)). Informative signposts explaining Yolngu culture's relationship to the land is provided on these marked trails.

=== Ecosystem and coastal waters ===
Ecosystems on the Gove Peninsula and in its coastal waters are of great conservation significance, being largely undisturbed due to isolation, huge area and sparse population. The waters provide a shallow-water tropical marine ecosystem, with varying habitats for marine and estuarine wildlife, and include mangroves, beds of seagrass, tidal flats, salt pans and saltmarshes.

=== Place names ===
Some place names were assigned to various places on the northern coast of Australia by the Macassan traders and Dutch and English explorers, including Matthew Flinders before the 20th century, including Arafura Sea and Arnhem Land (early alternative spelling: "Arnheim Land"). Flinders named Point Dundas, Drimmie Head, Melville Bay and Mount Saunders. However, an increasing number of non-Aboriginal people started arriving in the 20th century and assigning names. The airstrip constructed during the Second World War was the first place to be named Gove, after Pilot Officer William Gove, who was killed on 20 April 1943 in an air accident on the peninsula.

In the late 1960s and through the 1970s, many Yolngu people objected to the renaming of many places with English names, including Nhulunbuy. They presented a bark petition was to the Commonwealth Parliament in 1968 about the renaming of Nhulunbuy. Linguist Raymattja Marika and Melanie Wilkinson have recorded the origin and meaning of the Yolŋu place names, many of which relate to the stories of ancestral beings known as Wuyal (aka Birrinydjalki or Gandjalala), the "Sugar Bag Hunters", who had originally been Wäwilak and then Mandhalpuy. Eventually the Yolngu prevailed and the name Nhulunbuy was retained, but within the town, there are only two other Yolngu-derived names: Wuyal Road and the Rotary Marika Lookout, named after Dr Marika's father, Roy Marika.

== Climate ==
Situated just 12 degrees south of the Equator, the Gove Peninsula has a tropical savanna climate (Köppen: Aw). The non-Aboriginal people of the Northern Territory tropics recognise two distinct seasons, the dry season from mid-May to mid-November, and the wet season from mid-November to mid-May.

Climate data for Gove Airport Met Office (12º16'S, 136º49'E, 52 m AMSL) (1966-2023 normals and extremes, rainfall 1944-2023)
Month	Jan	Feb	Mar	Apr	May	Jun	Jul	Aug	Sep	Oct	Nov	Dec	Year
Record high °C (°F)	37.1 (98.8)	36.7 (98.1)	36.1 (97.0)	35.1 (95.2)	34.0 (93.2)	32.8 (91.0)	31.1 (88.0)	33.4 (92.1)	35.2 (95.4)	37.2 (99.0)	38.0 (100.4)	38.7 (101.7)	38.7 (101.7)
Mean daily maximum °C (°F)	32.1 (89.8)	31.7 (89.1)	31.4 (88.5)	31.0 (87.8)	30.0 (86.0)	28.5 (83.3)	27.9 (82.2)	28.8 (83.8)	30.5 (86.9)	32.0 (89.6)	33.2 (91.8)	33.1 (91.6)	30.9 (87.5)
Mean daily minimum °C (°F)	24.8 (76.6)	24.7 (76.5)	24.1 (75.4)	23.4 (74.1)	22.8 (73.0)	21.5 (70.7)	20.3 (68.5)	19.2 (66.6)	19.9 (67.8)	21.7 (71.1)	23.6 (74.5)	24.7 (76.5)	22.6 (72.6)
Record low °C (°F)	19.8 (67.6)	20.1 (68.2)	16.9 (62.4)	17.8 (64.0)	13.2 (55.8)	13.0 (55.4)	11.5 (52.7)	11.1 (52.0)	11.4 (52.5)	14.1 (57.4)	16.7 (62.1)	19.6 (67.3)	11.1 (52.0)
Average precipitation mm (inches)	276.9 (10.90)	266.1 (10.48)	276.3 (10.88)	232.8 (9.17)	84.1 (3.31)	31.8 (1.25)	18.1 (0.71)	5.0 (0.20)	7.6 (0.30)	9.6 (0.38)	44.0 (1.73)	184.9 (7.28)	1,461 (57.52)
Average precipitation days (≥ 1.0 mm)	10.6	10.4	11.0	8.3	5.6	3.8	2.3	0.9	0.5	0.8	1.8	6.3	62.3
Average afternoon relative humidity (%)	71	73	71	67	64	64	63	58	56	57	58	64	64
Average dew point °C (°F)	23.8 (74.8)	23.8 (74.8)	23.3 (73.9)	22.2 (72.0)	20.8 (69.4)	19.4 (66.9)	18.5 (65.3)	17.8 (64.0)	19.0 (66.2)	20.6 (69.1)	21.7 (71.1)	22.9 (73.2)	21.2 (70.1)
Mean monthly sunshine hours	182.9	149.7	186.0	216.0	241.8	225.0	241.8	288.3	297.0	313.1	282.0	229.4	2,853
Mean daily sunshine hours	5.9	5.3	6.0	7.2	7.8	7.5	7.8	9.3	9.8	10.1	9.4	7.4	7.8
Percentage possible sunshine	46	42	49	61	68	66	68	79	81	82	74	58	65
Source: Bureau of Meteorology

=== Yolngu seasons ===
Yolngu however recognise eight seasons derived from changing behaviours and patterns apparent in the land, flora and fauna, as follows:

- Dhuludur ('the Pre-wet season', October–November) when the weather is erratic, 'female' thunder and lightning storms are frequent, turtles and Threadfin Salmon are hunted, and the 'male' thunder shrinks the waterholes.
- Bärra'mirri ('the season of Heavy Rain and Growth', December–January) when there are heavy rains and prolific plant growth, the Magpie Geese arrive and shellfish are harvested.
- Mayaltha ('the Flowering season', February–March) when there are bright sunny days but little bush tucker, flies arrive and mosquito larvae are abundant in the pools.
- Midawarr ('the Fruiting season', March–April) when the east wind signals a time of abundant bush foods, including fruits, nuts and barramundi. *Ngathangamakulingamirri ('a two-week Harvest season', April)
- Dharratharramirri ('the Early Dry season', May–July) when the trade winds (south-southeast) arrive, the bush is fired, magpie-lark flocks arrive and sharks and stingrays give birth.
- Burrugumirri ('the time of the Birthing of Sharks and Stingrays', three weeks in July to August)
- Rarrandharr ('the Main Dry season', August–October) when warm southeast winds blow, the soil is hot, young sharks and stingrays are hunted, and the stringybark flowers.

== Demographics ==
On the night of the 2001 Census there were 13,080 people living in the East Arnhem region, which covers most of the Gove Peninsula. Of these 60.7% were Aboriginal people.

	Population	Percentage
Total Persons	13,080	-
Total Indigenous persons	7,940	60.7%
Males	3,905	49.2%
Females	4,035	50.8%

On the night of the 2001 Census there were 3,766 people living in the "Urban Centre" of Nhulunbuy. Of these 7.3% were Indigenous.

	Population	Percentage
Total Persons	3,766	-
Total Indigenous persons	275	7.3%
Males	2,135	56.7%
Females	1,631	43.3%

Based on a 2004 NT Government Socio-Economic Snapshot, there is a population of 14,115 within the Gove Peninsula (East Arnhem Region), of which almost 64% are Indigenous people, and a population of nearly 4,000 in Nhulunbuy, the majority being non-Indigenous people. Those people not living in Nhulunbuy live in surrounding communities and traditional homelands. In the five years to 2004, the population declined in Nhulunbuy and Groote Eylandt and increased in the non-urban areas.

At the 2016 census, Nhulunbuy SSC (urban area) had a population of 3,240, with a median age of 32. Only 2.8% were Indigenous. Nhulunbuy Indigenous region had 9,559 Aboriginal and/or Torres Strait Islander residents, with 97.7% of these Aboriginal, 0.5 Torres Strait Islander, and 1.9% both.

=== Yolngu people ===
Owned by the traditional Aboriginal owners, the Yolngu people, it is a place rich in culture with Yolngu maintaining strong ties with their land, religion and traditions.

Rather than the name of a clan or family group, Yolngu is the word that Aboriginal people from East Arnhem Land, including the Gove Peninsula, use to refer to themselves. The main five clan groups of the region are Gumatj, Rirratjingu, Djapu, Madarrpa and Dhalwangu.

The prominent Marika family, many from Yirrkala, includes a number of artists and land rights activists, including Banduk Marika (13 October 1954 – 12 July 2021); Roy Dadaynga Marika (c.1925– 1993); and Wandjuk Marika (1927–1987). Educator and linguist Raymattja Marika (c.1959 – 11 May 2008) was NT Australian of the Year in 2007.

Yingiya Mark Guyula is the only independent Indigenous member of parliament in the Northern Territory as of 2020, representing the electoral division of Mulka, formerly the electoral division of Nhulunbuy.

The Yolngu people call white people "balanda" (probably derived from the word "Hollander" – Dutch person).

=== Communities ===
- Yirrkala lies 18 kilometres (11 mi) south-east of Nhulunbuy. It comprises a predominantly Aboriginal population of about 809 people (2016 Australian Census).
- Gunyangara, also known as Marngarr or Ski Beach, has a population of around 280, mostly people of the Gumatj clan, with family names Yunupingu, Burarrwanga and Munungirritj. It is situated on Drimmie Head in Melville Bay, 14 km (8.7 mi) west of Nhulunbuy and adjacent to Gove Port. It has an airstrip and full-time doctor and health clinic. There are Makassan historic sites on the island, which is joined to the Gove Peninsula by a causeway built during World War II to provide access to the Catalina flying boat base. Since silting has occurred, Drimmie Head is also sometimes referred to as a peninsula. Drimmie Head was named by Matthew Flinders on 14 February 1803 as he sailed around the island and it reminded him of a place in Scotland. (Note: The name origin appears to be related to the Snabs of Drimmie, near a headland opposite the village of Kingoodie in Perthshire, which has a very similar shape.)
- Birritjimi, also known as Wallaby Beach, comprises a 5 km (3.1 mi) stretch of beach in Melville Bay. The north-facing part of beach is Birritjimi Beach, and as it curves around to face northwest, the stretch beyond the creek mouth is known as Wallaby Beach. There is a group of homes constructed in the 1970s to provide accommodation for Rio Tinto mining executives, inhabited mainly by members of the Gurruwiwi family and other members of the Galpu clan. Some healthcare is provided by mobile units operating out of clinics in Nhulunbuy and Gunyangara. Birritjimi is the home of yiḏaki master and elder of the Galpu clan, Djalu Gurruwiwi. Rio Tinto handed over the homes to traditional owners represented by Rirratjingu Aboriginal Corporation in 2008. As of 2020 the houses are in very poor condition and are facing demolition, as they are no longer deemed safe. The Northern Territory Government is providing emergency repairs and assistance, but says that the Northern Land Council is responsible for the maintenance of the homes. Rirratjingu has applied to the Commonwealth Government for funds to help move the residents to Nhulunbuy, Gunyangara and Yirrkala, but Djalu and his son Larry Gurruwiwi are reluctant to leave Birritjimi.

== Governance ==
There are 10 local councils in the region which administer the townships of Nhulunbuy and Angurugu and a number of local communities that primarily service Indigenous people.

== Economy ==
=== Mining ===
Nhulunbuy is a purpose-built town developed by the former owner of Alcan Gove (Nabalco), a huge bauxite mine and now closed alumina refinery 15 km (9.3 mi). The town is built on a Special Purpose Lease on Aboriginal land and as of 2007 was the largest town in East Arnhem Land, the fourth largest town in the Northern Territory and the administrative centre for the region.

The Commonwealth Government carried out mineral explorations in the 1950s and was successful in discovering a bauxite deposit that covered 65 square kilometres (25 sq mi) and contained an estimated 250 million tonnes. After initial resistance to mining by the government Nabalco was set up and was granted a lease with a commitment to build a township, port facility and mine. The construction of the mine lead to the Gove land rights case (see above), which initially resulted in ruling in favour of the mineral company.

The market economy of the Gove Peninsula was centred on the Alcan Gove Mine, located on leasehold land within the boundaries of Aboriginal freehold land. In November 2013 Rio Tinto announced the closure of the mine associated alumina refinery (but not the bauxite mine) in July 2014 with the loss of 1,100 jobs, or almost 25% of the town's population. The population had already dropped by mid 2014, with some of the workforce retained to monitor the shutdown and survey holding ponds full of toxic compounds but most will be gone by January 2015. A range of measures were announced to support the town and its former workers through the closure and the following three years, but locals anticipated further cuts to services since the school, hospital, power plant and flights were backed by Rio Tinto. The closure of the mine also left flights on the Darwin-Nhulunbuy route to fall to around 50-60% full, causing Qantas to suspend flights on the route from 17 August 2015.

Rio Tinto announced that the bauxite mine would be closed by 2030 or sooner.

=== Spaceport ===
The Arnhem Space Centre has created employment for local people, and brought NASA staff and many tourists to the town when three rockets were launched in mid-2022, booking out accommodation for weeks. The longterm future of the site is not known, but the owners of the project, Equatorial Launch Australia, has indicated that there are other space companies interested in using the rocket launch pad, and NASA has confirmed that it will use the facility again in the future.

== Transport ==
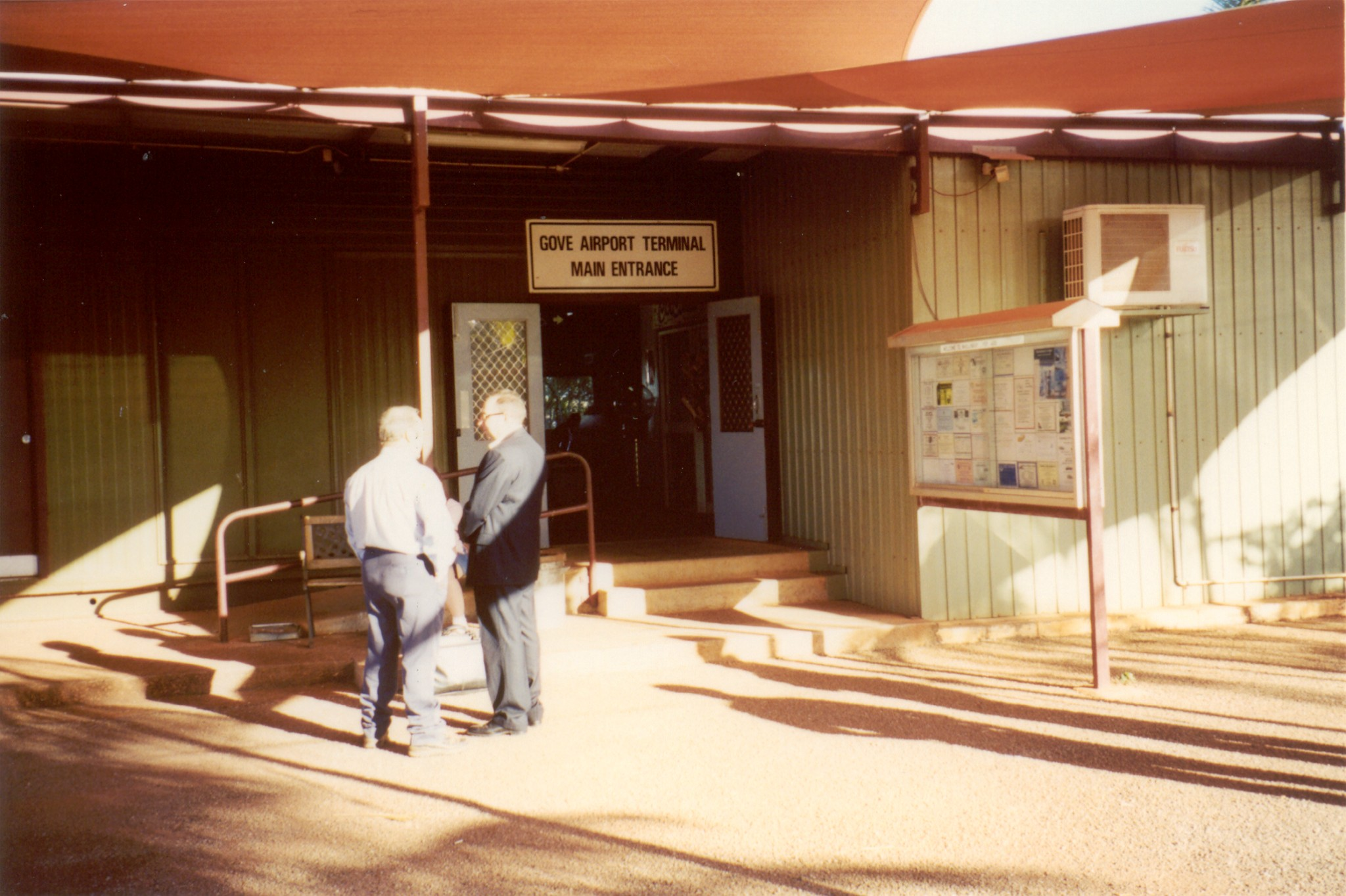
The old airport terminal at Gove Airport.

It is possible to hire four wheel drives, conventional vehicles or bicycles in Nhulunbuy and an airport bus and taxi company service the town.

=== Air ===
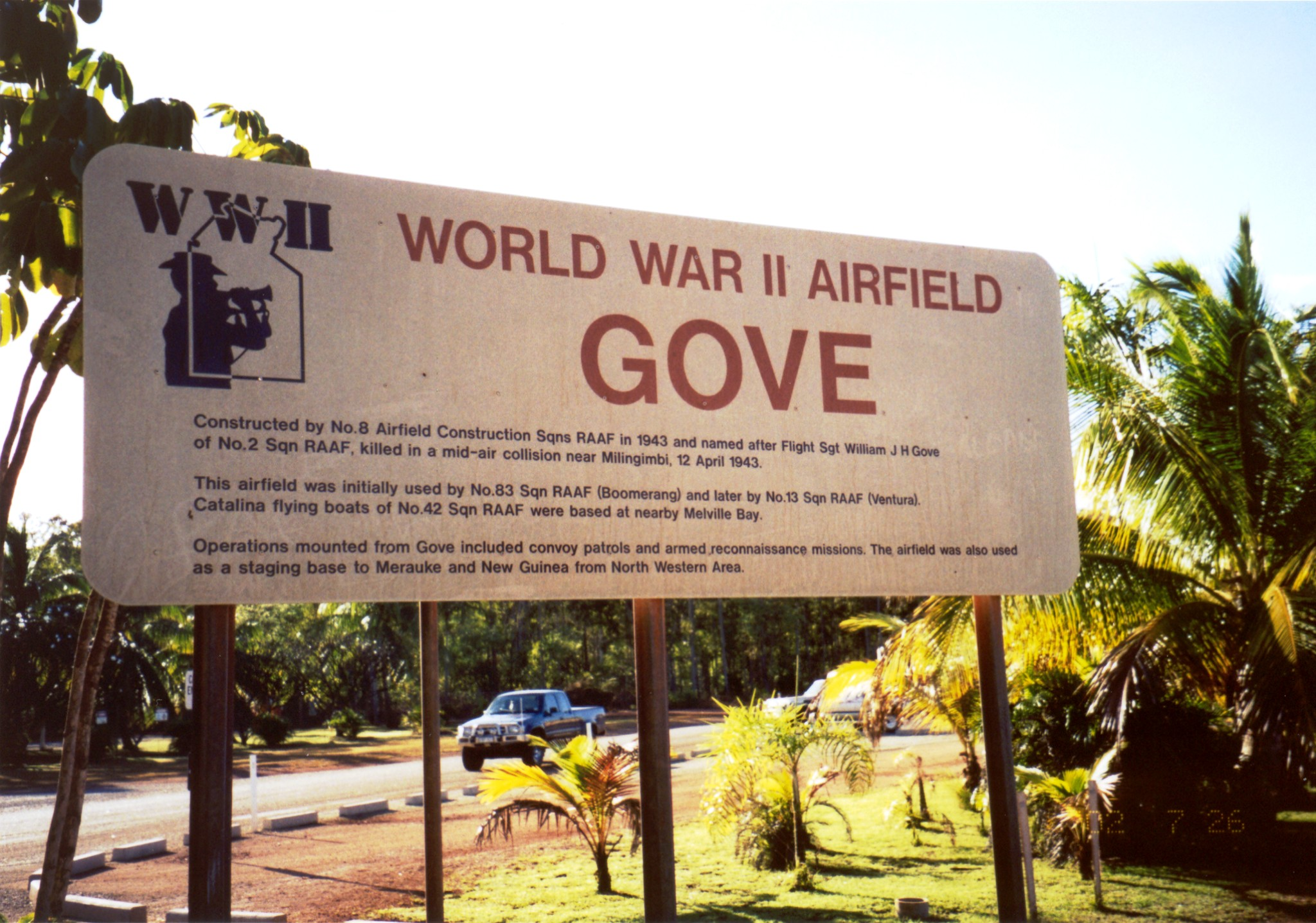
Sign commemorating Gove Airport's World War II service.

The Gove Airport is located 13 km from the town centre of Nhulunbuy. AirNorth has a daily flight to Gove from Cairns and Darwin which then connect to cities around the world. Qantas used to run a daily flight but when the refinery closed they discontinued this service. The Cairns – Gove flight is 1 hour and 40 minutes duration and Darwin – Gove is 1 hour and 10 minutes.

=== Road ===
The most direct route to Nhulunbuy from a major Highway is via the Central Arnhem Road which leaves the Stuart Highway 52 km south of Katherine. The first 30 kilometres are sealed and then the rest is a gravel road. A four-wheel-drive vehicle is recommended, particularly for the two major river crossings, the Wilton River near Bulman Aboriginals Community and the Goyder River, about 300 kilometres from Nhulunbuy. Fuel needs to be carried as travellers may not be able to purchase fuel along the way. The Central Arnhem Road is 682 kilometres long, plus the 52 kilometres from Katherine to the turnoff makes a long drive, approximately 8 or 9 hours drive with good conditions. Travellers require a permit as the road runs across many Yolngu Clan lands.

== Education ==
Nhulunbuy has one public primary school, which incorporates pre-school, and one public secondary school which provides education to a Year 12 level. There is also a private school, Nhulunbuy Christian College, which provides education from Transition to Year 10. Yirrkala has a primary school which supports further afield community schools.

== Society and culture ==
Yolngu culture and ties to the land are still very strong and sacred. Many people still live mainly a traditional life. The Garma Festival, which celebrates Yolngu culture, is held each August at Gulkula, attracting thousands from around Australia and the world to enjoy and learn from music, dance, art and craft, and sport. There are three art centres on the peninsula: Nambara Arts and Crafts near Nhulunbuy, Buku Larrngay Mulka in Yirrkala, and Elcho Island Arts, producing work that is known worldwide.

=== Music ===
Arnhem Land, including the Gove Peninsula, is home to what is commonly referred to as the didgeridoo, known as the yidaki locally, and Yolngu are master players and craftsmen of the instrument. In this region, the rhythms, techniques and compositions endemic to the people are of outstanding musical interest.

Didgeridoos from north-east Arnhem Land are instruments of the highest cultural integrity. The use of the didgeridoo in this part of Australia continues as an unbroken tradition since time immemorial. In recent times, the Yothu Yindi band and Djalu Gurruwiwi - "Mr Didgeridoo" - has done much to popularise the yidaki around the world. Yidaki are commonly made in north-east Arnhem Land from gadayka - Eucalyptus tetradonta or Stringybark, gungurru - Eucalyptus miniata or Woolybutt, and badawili - Eucalyptus ferruginea or Rusty Bloodwood.

=== Sport and recreation ===
Sport is a big part of the lives of people in Nhulunbuy and there are facilities including a sports ground, golf course, yacht club, swimming pool, fishing club, surf-lifesaving club, speedway and skate park.

Sailing

Gove Harbour is a popular stop off point for yachts sailing the northern coast of Australia or heading to the countries to the north of Australia and beyond. Apart from the months of December to April when cyclones can affect the coast line, the waters surrounding the Gove Peninsula provide excellent sailing conditions. The Gove Boat Club is often packed full of visiting yachties from all over the world and the club often holds regattas and other annual events.

== See also ==
- List of ports in Australia
- Commonwealth v Yunupingu - High Court of Australia decision regarding mining leases in the Gove Peninsula
