= Mandela van Eeden =

American radio personality

- Born: May 31, 1987 (age 37); San Francisco, California
- Occupation(s): Radio personality, educator

Mandela van Eeden (May 31, 1987) is an American radio personality and educator who lives in Missoula, Montana.

== Life and career ==
Van Eeden was born in San Francisco, California, but grew up in Australia, South Africa, and Montana.

Van Eeden is host of “The Trail Less Travelled,” an international adventure and travel radio show and podcast. Van Eeden's radio and podcast interviews document humanitarian and environmental concerns.

Van Eeden is also an educator and an international whitewater adventure instructor. Van Eeden started working as a river guide when she was 17 years old.

Van Eeden is on the board of The Montana Wildlife Federation.

== Music ==
Van Eeden plays the didgeridoo and was in a band called "Peanut Butter and Didjeridu Jam". She started playing the didgeridoo when she was eight years old and takes a didgeridoo on her worldwide travels.
