= East Journey =

Australian rock/reggae band from Arnhem Land

- Origin: Arnhem Land, Northern Territory, Australia
- Genres: Rock; reggae
- Years active: 2010–?
- Label: East Journey/MGM
- Members: Rrawun Murmuru; PJ White; Malngay Yunupingu; Ngalkanbuy Mununggurr; Arian Pearson; Ses "Fury" Frank; Banul Garawirrtja; Manharrngu Marawili; Gathapura Mununggurr
- Website: East Journey Website (archive)

East Journey are a rock/reggae band from North East Arnhem Land, Northern Territory. They combined modern and traditional music and sing in both English and Yolŋu.

== History ==
The band formed in 2010, and their debut album Guwak was released on 30 March 2012. They have had airplay on Triple J and Radio Australia, and had several nominations and wins at the National Indigenous Music Awards between 2012 and 2015.

In 2015, they collaborated with Yothu Yindi on a project called Genesis, which included an EP and a performance at the National Indigenous Music Awards 2015.

In June 2021, they played at the Yarrapay Festival, at Buku-Larrnggay Mulka Art Centre in Yirrkala, along with Yothu Yindi, the Andrew Gurruwiwi Band, and Yirrmal.

== Discography ==
=== Albums ===
Title	Details
Guwak	Released: 2012; Label: East Journey (EJ001); Format: CD, digital download
The Genesis Project (featuring Yothu Yindi)	Released: February 2015; Label: East Journey; Format: digital download

=== Singles ===
Year	Title	Album
2012	"Ngarrpiya"	Guwak
2014	"Bright Lights, Big City"	The Genesis Project
2014	"Song of Arnhem Land"	The Genesis Project
2015	"Emu"	The Genesis Project
2015	"Ngarrpiya (Octopus)" (featuring Yothu Yindi)	The Genesis Project
2015	"Mokuy & Bonba" (with Djalu Gurruwiwi)	non album single

== National Indigenous Music Awards ==
The National Indigenous Music Awards recognise excellence, innovation and leadership among Aboriginal and Torres Strait Islander musicians from throughout Australia. They commenced in 2004.

Year	Nominee / work	Award	Result
2012	themselves	G.R. Bururrawanga Memorial Award	Won
2012	"Ngarrpiya"	Film Clip of the Year	Won
2012	"Ngarrpiya"	Song of the Year	Nominated
2012	"Ngarrpiya"	Cover Art of the Year	Nominated
2014	themselves	Best New Talent	Nominated
2015	The Genesis Project	Album of the Year	Nominated
2015	"Song of Arnhem Land"	Film Clip of the Year	Nominated
2015	"Song of Arnhem Land"	Cover Art of the Year	Nominated
2015	Traditional Song of the Year	"Mokuy & Bonba" (with Djalu Gurruwiwi)	Won
