= Garma Festival of Traditional Cultures =

Australia's largest annual Indigenous cultural gathering

The Garma Festival of Traditional Cultures (Garma) is Australia's largest Indigenous cultural gathering, taking place over four days each August in northeast Arnhem Land, in the Northern Territory, Australia. Hosted by the Yothu Yindi Foundation, Garma is a celebration of the cultural traditions of the Yolngu people, and a major community gathering for the clans and families of the Arnhem Land region.

The event showcases traditional miny'tji (art), ancient story-telling, manikay (song), and bunggul (dance). It is held at Gulkula, a significant Gumatj ceremonial site about 40 kilometres (25 mi) from the township of Nhulunbuy, attracts more than 2,500 guests each year and is often sold out months in advance.

In recent years, Garma has become an important fixture on the political calendar, attracting business, political, academic, and philanthropic leaders to help shape Indigenous affairs policy through the Key Forum conference.

== History ==
The first Garma was held in 1999 and was little more than a backyard barbecue. Dhapanbal Yunupingu, the daughter of Dr M Yunupingu, said the first event was a small-scale affair. "I remember when Galarrwuy and dad brought us here, and they were standing on the Bunggul ground, and they said: This is the Garma site, this is where the festival is going to be.' We were only little. Dad picked his camp. My uncles picked their camp. There were five white fellas who came. There were no tents, two cars, and a BBQ. Our chef slept next to the back of the ute in a swag".

In 2010, Rhoda Roberts was consultant festival director of the festival, and helped to shape its future.

=== 2013 ===
The 50th anniversary of the Yirrkala bark petitions was celebrated at the Garma Festival in 2013, with former mission head teacher Ron Croxford invited as a special guest.

=== 2017 ===
At Garma 2017, the Gumatj Corporation entered into several historic agreements with the federal government and other parties. These included plans for the Gulkula Regional Training Centre, a township lease agreement for Gunyangara, and an agreement with Rio Tinto Alcan on bauxite sales for the Gulkula Mine project. This would be the first Indigenous-owned and -operated mining venture on traditional owner land. In addition, the Corporation discussed the potential hosting of a rocket launch site (see below).

=== 2020–2021: COVID-19 pandemic ===
Due to the COVID-19 pandemic in Australia the Garma festival was cancelled in 2020. The 2021 event was also cancelled, largely due to COVID-19 developments in Victoria, being a growing outbreak in late May. The NT Chief Health Officer decided the remoteness of the north-east Arnhem Land location of the festival posed a public health risk if an outbreak occurred.

=== 2022: PM attends ===
At the 2022 Garma Festival, Anthony Albanese was the first Prime Minister of Australia to attend the festival in five years. After winning the 2022 election earlier that year, he promised to hold a referendum on an Indigenous Voice to Parliament, so he was greeted with hope and excitement. Linda Burney, the Minister for Indigenous Australians, also attended, along with Pat Dodson.

=== 2023: Voice referendum announced ===
At the 2023 Garma Festival, Anthony Albanese announced that the Voice referendum was to be held later that year. Other politicians who attended include Attorney-General Mark Dreyfus; Assistant Minister for Indigenous Health and Indigenous Australians Malarndirri McCarthy; Marion Scrymgour, MP for Lingiari; NT Chief Minister Natasha Fyles, and the independent member for Mulka in the NT legislative assembly, Yingiya Mark Guyula, an NT independent. The keynote address was given by cultural leader Mayatili Marika. Linda Burney addressed the corporate dinner. Opposition leader Peter Dutton declined his invitation to Garma.

=== 2024: "Fire, strength, renewal" ===
After the 2023 referendum failed to pass, Albanese was more subdued, and spoke about more practical measures he was planning, to empower Indigenous Australians economically. The new Indigenous Australians minister, NT Senator Malarndirri McCarthy, also attended. The theme of the festival was "Fire, strength, renewal" (Gurtha-Wuma Worrk-gu). Djawa Yunupingu, chair of the Yothu Yindi Foundation, that hosts the festival, said that while the referendum question had been defeated, his people still looked to the future: "After the fire, when the rain comes it renews the land and new growth emerging". No Opposition members attended the festival.

== Features ==
The word garma is a Yolngu word referring to a ceremonial site for ritual circumcision, and by extension "any sacred ceremony held in camp". It has also been cited as meaning a "two-way learning process", or "a public ceremony embodying the meeting of fresh and saltwater".

The festival has three main aims:

- To provide contemporary environments and programs for the practice, preservation, maintenance and presentation of traditional knowledge systems and cultural traditions and practices, especially bunggul (traditional dance), Manikay (song), Miny' tji (art) and ceremony.
- To share knowledge and culture, thereby fostering greater understanding between Indigenous and non-Indigenous Australians.
- To develop economic opportunities for Yolngu through education, training, employment, enterprise and remote Indigenous community development.

=== Bunggul ===
One of Garma's main highlights is the nightly bunggul – traditional ceremonial dances performed each day from 4:00 pm until sunset. In these highly significant ceremonies, men, women and children from the 13 Yolngu clan groups perform a dance unique to northeast Arnhem Land. During these performances, the senior holders of the Yolngu songlines share with guests their stories of manikay (song), accompanied by the call of the yidaki (didgeridoo) and the rhythm of the bilma (clapsticks).

In 2014, The Monthly's "Best of Australian Arts" edition described the bunggul as "an exhilarating performance" and "an example of one of the world’s oldest musical traditions. We must do everything to recognise its enormous value to our lives as Australians".

=== Key Forum ===
Held over three days, the Garma Key Forum has become an important platform for the discussion and debate of Indigenous issues and policy, attracting political, business, academic, and philanthropic leaders from Australia and overseas. It is an important political event for this reason. Although the conference agenda changes yearly to reflect the Garma theme, topics such as Indigenous land rights, Indigenous health, education, economic development and government funding are regularly part of the program.

=== Gapan Gallery ===
Set in a grove of stringy-bark trees adjacent to the bunggul grounds, the open-air Gapan Gallery features limited edition artworks from a range of local and regional arts centres. Arts centres featured at recent Garma events include Buku-Larrnggay, Bula'Bula Arts, Elcho Island Arts, and Ngukkur Arts Centre.

=== Cultural Workshops ===
Senior Yolngu men and women provide a series of cultural workshops which provide guests with an immersive experience in an authentic bush setting. Workshops include instruction in the local Yolngu Matha language, kinship lessons, 'Learning on Country' walks, spear-making, and basket-weaving.

=== Youth Forum ===
The Garma Youth Forum runs a four-day program for children and youth aged 8–18, including an Education Fair on the first day of the event. Schools from across Australia join with students from local and regional schools for a range of activities and workshops aimed at building cross-cultural bonds and sharing knowledge. There's also a strong emphasis on developing leadership skills for the next generation, and in recent years, participants from the Youth Forum have led the closing Key Forum session, sharing the lessons they have learned over the course of the 4 days and their hopes and dreams for the future.

=== Music ===
Music has always been a major feature of the Garma program, showcasing the distinctive Arnhem Land sound and providing a platform for new and emerging regional acts as well as more established Top End bands and singers. Crowd favourites such as Bärra West Wind, Sunrize Band (Maningrida), Eylandt Band (Groote Eylandt), Mambali Band (Numbulwar), Garrangali Band (Baniyala), Wirrinyga Band (Milingimbi) and Wildwater (Maningrida), all regularly feature on the bill.

=== Yiḏaki Masterclass ===
Djalu Gurruwiwi delivered the first Yiḏaki Masterclass at the inaugural Garma Festival in 1999, and has delivered all subsequent Yiḏaki Masterclasses since.

== The Gulkula site ==
Garma is held at Gulkula, a significant Gumatj ceremonial site in northeast Arnhem Land, in a stringy-bark forest atop an escarpment overlooking the Gulf of Carpentaria. The trees on the escarpment at Gulkula are mainly of one species of stringybark known as Eucalyptus tetradonta. In Yolngu culture the grey stringy-barks have many names, and one Dhuwa moiety name is "Gadayka".

In August, Gadayka is in flower and small native bees turn nectar into honey. Gulkula is connected with the actions of a Yolngu ancestor, Ganbulapula. In his search for honey, Ganbulapula used his walking stick to hit the trees and so disturb the bees. With his hand shielding his eyes from the sun as he looked up, Ganbulapula could see the tiny black bees hovering around their hive in the hollow of a tree; he looked upwards to trace the flight of bees.

A link is established through honey and the actions of both the Yirritja and Dhuwa moiety ancestors, with people and land and sea-country across northeast Arnhem Land. The significance of bees and honey is manifested in sacred designs that identify the body of cultural knowledge associated with honey.

=== Rocket tracking site ===
In 1964, many of the trees on the escarpment at Gulkula were bulldozed and then burnt by the Department of Works so the Gove Down Range Guidance and Telemetry Station could be built. At the time, the Yolngu owners had no rights in Australian law, and they were unable to prevent the European Launcher Development Organisation from installing a rocket tracking station on the ceremonial site. The purpose of the station was to track the path of rockets launched from Woomera in South Australia, and its state-of-the-art technology was operated by mainly Belgian scientists.

In September 2020, the original twenty-tonne satellite tracker, which had been stored at Woomera for decades, was returned to the Gove Peninsula, to be restored and put on display at the Gove Airport headquarters of the Arnhemland Historical Society.

=== Rocket launch site ===
In 2017, per the Aboriginal Land Rights Act 1976, the Yolngu landowners were consulted on the possible construction of a new space facility. In 2017, the Gumatj clan, through the Northern Land Council, approved a lease to the Gumatj Corporation for the purposes of operating a sub-orbital rocket launch pad, a first not just for Yolngu but for Australia.

The proposed site covers 65 hectares (160 acres), and had by 2019 been sub-leased to Equatorial Launch Australia (ELA) by the Gumatj people. ELA will hire out Gulkula Launch Site to aeronautical organisations such as NASA. In May 2019, NASA announced its intention to sign a contract with ELA, and launch four rockets in 2020.

The site is seen by NASA as a move from its previous preferred site for rocket launches in Australia at Woomera, which it has not used since 1995. The proximity of a deep-water port is seen as an advantage, reducing the cost of transporting rockets and payloads, compared with road transport across the desert. In July 2019, scientists from NASA visited the site, funded by the Northern Territory Government and ELA. The facility is seen as a huge opportunity to boost the economy of the region, providing jobs and pathways for STEM graduates.
