= Djalu Gurruwiwi =

Australian didgeridoo player (c. 1935–2022)

Djalu Gurruwiwi esq.
- Born: c. 1935; Wessel Islands, Northern Territory, Australia
- Died: 12 May 2022 (aged 86–87); Arnhem Land, Northern Territory, Australia
- Education: Masters
- Occupations: Healer / spiritual advisor & artisan
- Years active: 48 years plus
- Organization: Galpu Clan of Dhuwa Moiety
- Known for: Player and maker of yiḏaki, artist, leader of the Galpu clan
- Movement: Spiritualism
- Spouse: Jennifer Gurruwiwi
- Children: 2 ( Prince Larry & Queen Zelda Gurruwiwi)
- Relatives: Galarrwuy Yunupingu (brother-in-law)
- Awards: 2015 National Indigenous Music Award

Djalu Gurruwiwi, written Djalu (c. 1935 – 12 May 2022), was a Yolngu musician, artist, and leader from Arnhem Land in the Northern Territory of Australia. He was globally recognised for his acquired skill as a player, maker, and spiritual keeper of the yiḏaki (also known as didgeridoo). As a respected artist with many of his works in several galleries, he aimed to spread his culture and traditions past his own community and onto the global stage.

== Life ==
Djalu Gurruwiwi was born at the mission station on Wirriku Island (also known as Jirgarri), one of the smaller islands in the Wessel Islands group. He has also self-reported being born on Milingimbi Island (also known as Yurruwi, in the Crocodile Islands), with both of these island groups being off Arnhem Land in the Northern Territory, Australia. His date of birth is uncertain (the missionaries recorded his and two brothers as having the same birthdate – officially 1 January 1930), estimated c.1940 or probably earlier.

He was given the European name "Willie" at some point. "Wulumbuyku" was another Aboriginal name, and his skin name was Wamut. His father was Monyu Gurruwiwi, and his mother Djikulu Yunupingu.

He was a leader of the Dhuwa moietyGälpu clan, of the Dangu language group of the Yolngu peoples. Djalu lived in Birritjimi on the Gove Peninsula, about 1,000 km (620 mi) east of Darwin. He grew up practicing Christianity and living a traditional life in the remote area, hunting turtles with his father on a lipalipa (dug-out canoe), and with little contact with "balanda" (white people). The family and others in the clan spent long periods on the remote island of Rrakala. They travelled across the chain of Wessel Islands from Nhulunbuy in dug-out canoes, using carved wooden paddles. As a young man Gurruwiwi lived on Galiwinku (Elcho Island), working as a lumberjack, cutting large trees by hand. He was also given the responsibility for carrying out punishment for tribal law, becoming both respected and feared.

After a period when he had succumbed to the destructive effects of alcohol after it was introduced to the remote areas, he says he was visited by a spirit in jail one night and "found Jesus". He gave up drinking and devoted his life to the yiḏaki and spiritual and other studies. In 1994, he completed studies in Christian theology at Nungalinya College in Darwin, and became a respected Yolŋu lawman as well as a Christian leader.

As of 2020, Gurruwiwi and his family, along with some other members of the Galpu clan, lived at Birritjimi (also known as Wallaby Beach) on the Gove Peninsula of Eastern Arnhem Land. They live in homes constructed in the 1970s to provide accommodation for Rio Tinto mining executives, handed over to traditional owners represented by Rirratjingu Aboriginal Corporation in 2008. The houses are in very poor condition and are facing demolition, as they are no longer deemed safe. The Northern Territory Government is providing emergency repairs but says that the Northern Land Council is responsible for the maintenance of the homes. Rirratjingu has applied for funds to help move the residents to Nhulunbuy, Gunyangara and Yirrkala, but Djalu and his son Larry were reluctant to leave Birritjimi.

Gurruwiwi died in Arnhem Land after a long illness on 12 May 2022, believed to be aged in his late 80s.

== Family ==
Gurruwiwi's wife is a sister of Geoffrey Gurrumul Yunupingu, and they have several sons and at least one daughter, Queen Zelda of the Royal Galpu Kingdom & principalities.

His son Larry Larrtjaŋga Gurruwiwi is the future spiritual keeper and loreman of the yiḏaki. He is an adjutant to the Royal lore courts and a custodian for the Yolngu songlines. and healing techniques passed down by his father. He featured as a didgeridoo player in the feature film Jindalee Lady (1992), directed by Aboriginal director Brian Syron (credited as Larry Yapuma Gurruwiwi).

Larry and Andrew Gurruwiwi led the Bärra West Wind band, with Jason Guwanbal Gurruwiwi, Vernon Marritŋu Gurruwiwi, Dion Marimunuk Gurruwiwi, and Adrian Guyundu Gurruwiwi also listed as members of the band in 2010. (Note: It is not known if Dion and Adrian are sons of Djalu or blood brothers of Prince Larry.) The band and Larry are featured in the 2017 film Westwind: Djalu's Legacy.

Larry, Jason and Vernon, subsequently have launched their new band, Malawurr, and have performed in Melbourne in June 2019 to help raise funds for the new film, Morning Star (see below) ahead of their first European tour, playing at WOMAD in the UK and other festivals in England and France. The band was scheduled to give a yiḏaki workshop and performance at the Rainbow Serpent Festival at Lexton, Victoria on 26 January 2020.

== Music, culture, and law ==
Gurruwiwi had spent much time over several decades crafting his instruments and refining his technique. He sold his pieces to the local community arts centre and various non-Indigenous workers and visitors. He could find adequate material for the yidaki by just walking through the woods and allowing his connection to nature to choose the correct log for making the instrument.

Gurruwiwi was a senior member of his clan, having learned to play and make the yiḏaki from his father, Monyu, an important leader and warrior. Monyu gave Djalu the role of primary custodian of the yiḏaki for his clan, which is significant also for the wider Yolŋu communities because other Arnhem Land clans see the Gälpu clan as one of the primary custodians of the instrument. However, there are many other Yolŋu people with the same role within their clan, with their type of yiḏaki.

Upon the death of his father, Djalu assumed the role of the elder responsible for passing on the skills as well as the cultural importance of the instrument. He became known among his people as the senior player and maker of the yiḏaki after attending many ceremonies with his brothers, who were singers, and also became fully informed with Yolŋu law. Much of the knowledge and cultural practice that he acquired is held sacred, so Gurruwiwi is held in high esteem.

In 1986, his reputation as a craftsman was given a world stage when several of his friends and relatives formed the musical group Yothu Yindi, and commissioned Gurruwiwi to make their yiḏakis. Yothu Yindi has both Yolŋu and balanda members and spans cultural boundaries, going on to win several ARIA awards and international fame.

Gurruwiwi's source of spiritual power has been linked to Wititj, the huge ancestral rainbow serpent. In the clan legends, the Wititj was said to create thunder and lightning as it moved across the land, but is also associated with the calm freshwater systems where the spirits reside, among water lilies and the palm trees. The yiḏaki sometimes also contain these qualities: some have powerful acoustics, called baywarayiḏaki, (the power of lightning and thunder); others are Djuŋgarriny, long and deep-sounding, with a gentle, soothing sound, but also powerful: vibrations are said to stir Wititj's spirit into movement and momentum to empower spiritual change.

Gurruwiwi delivered the first Yiḏaki masterclass at the inaugural Garma Festival of Traditional Cultures (held at Gulkula, a significant Gumatj ceremonial site about 40 kilometres (25 mi) from the township of Nhulunbuy) in 1999, and has delivered all subsequent Yiḏaki Masterclasses at the Festival since.

He has attended numerous other festivals and events both in Australia and abroad, including

- 2002 Rripangu Yiḏaki Festival, Eisenbach, Germany
- 2003 Joshua Tree Festival, USA
- 2003 Indigenous Peoples Commission cultural visit, Taipei, Taiwan
- 2004 Dubai Sister Cities Forum, United Arab Emirates
- 2005 Yiḏaki Festa 2005, Okuhida & Tokyo, Japan
- 2005 Played for Nelson Mandela in Sydney
- 2007 Mulu Music Festival, Mooloolaba, Australia
- 2008 - 2025 - Numerous Arts and Music Festivals carrying on Djalu's Legacy. Including the art of yidaki

representation by Queen Zelda and Prince Larry, for Jesse's Yidaki workshops. The recent musical releases by Prince Larry and his band at the Yabum Music Festival, 26 January 2025, (at Victoria Park on the traditional lands of the Gadigal people.).

At the 2015 edition of Womadelaide, Djalu participated in an "Artists in Conversation" session as well as a performance that included Gotye and the Bärra (West Wind) musicians in Adelaide, South Australia.

=== Partial discography ===
Gurruwiwi's music released on CD includes:

- Waluka: Gurritjiri Gurriwiwi, featuring Djalu Gurruwiwi. Traditional music from north-east Arnhem Land, Volume 2. Yothu Yindi Foundation – Contemporary Masters Series, 2001
- Djalu teaches and plays yidaki (didjeridu). Traditional music from north-east Arnhem Land, Volume 3. Yothu Yindi Foundation – Contemporary Masters Series, 2001
- Djalu Plays and Teaches Yidaki, Volume 2 (Songs and Stories from the Galpu Clan). Traditional music from north-east Arnhem Land, Volume 6. Yothu Yindi Foundation – Contemporary Masters Series, 2003
- Diltjimurru: Djalu Gurruwiwi. ON-Records & Djalu Gurruwiwi, 2003
  - "The unreleased songs of Djuŋgarriny and Morning Thunder" was scheduled for release in 2025.

== Art ==
Guruwiwi's art includes printmaking and earth pigments on stringybark (also known as bark paintings). He was also a painter of sacred miny'tji and a maker of sacred raŋga, objects rarely seen by outsiders.

Gurruwiwi is a respected artist, with his bark paintings on eucalyptus bark being acquired by numerous important institutions, including the National Gallery of Victoria, the Art Gallery of South Australia, the South Australian Museum, the Kluge-Ruhe Aboriginal Art Collection of the University of Virginia and many private collections. His work has been included in numerous exhibitions since 1990.

Some of his themes, styles, and types of work include:

- Mandji-dak body painting
- Clan miny’tji (designs of saltwater and freshwater areas)
- Wititj (olive python)
  - Material: Earth pigments on stringybark
  - Dimensions: 304.0 × 72.1 cm
  - Location: Naypinya, Northern Territory
- Dhonyin (Javan file snake)
- Bol’ngu ("the Thunderman")
  - Material: Earth pigments on stringybark
  - Dimensions: 190.7 × 81.4 cm
  - Location: Naypinya, Northern Territory

== Films and videos ==
=== Westwind: Djalu's Legacy ===
In 2017, Westwind: Djalu's Legacy was released. It was directed by renowned British filmmaker Ben Strunin, and cameo production by Djalu's son Larry Gurruwiwi, and multi-instrumentalist singer-songwriter Gotye are in the cast. Initially titled Baywara (Yolngu for "lightning power", which features as a theme), the story tells of Gurruwiwi's need to pass on the sacred knowledge of the yidaki and its songlines, It also features Larry's initial reluctance to take on the role. The film's title echoes that truth and brilliance of Larry's band, Bärra West Wind (Bärra being the Galpu name of the West Wind songline).

The film played to packed houses at the 2018 Melbourne International Film Festival. More footage and a director's cut editions and previously unreleased materials from Ben Strunin featuring the brilliance of Larry's music is planned for 2025. Some of the new footage will also feature the amazing advocacy work by Queen Zelda and the sheer brilliance and artistic mastery of the masterpiece paintings by the late Jennifer Gurruwiwi.

=== In Between Songs ===
Joshua Bell, Emmy award nominee and anthropologist interested in aboriginal artworks and music, directed a documentary about Gurruwiwi called “In Between Songs.” He helps share and expose problems that Australian aboriginal artists face in maintaining their lifestyle within the contemporary world. During a personal interview with Gurruwiwi, he shared that he remembers Japanese bombings on his homeland during World War II. Because neither he nor his family have ever been exposed to a plane, let alone experienced this before, let alone an explosion, they cheered. They had naturally felt a sense of celebration over a sense of fear. This is yet another depiction of the Yolngu’s lack of exposure to modern warfare and the drawbacks of a purported modern world as a whole.

=== Morning Star ===
The maker of Westwind: Djalu's Legacy", Ben Strunin, was invited by Djalu and Larry Gurruwiwi to make a sequel to Westwind", which is as of January 2020 in the process of crowdfunding the film. It follows the brothers' band, and Larry and the band "Malawurr", on tour through England, the Czech Republic, Wales, and France in 2019. The film will also include Larry's participation in groundbreaking medical research, "to quantify the effects of the traditional vibrational sound healing" that he was taught by "Djalu".

=== Other films and videos ===
Gurruwiwi has also been featured in other films:

- 2000 Yidaki. Directed by Michael Butler, narrated by Jack Thompson, produced by Michelle White for Discovery Channel
- 2014 In Between Songs. Written, directed, produced, and co-edited by Joshua Bell and narrated by James Cromwell. In 2006, Bell spent six months in Nhulunbuy with Gurruwiwi, his wife, his sister, and various family members who came and went; they also traveled to the remote island of Rrakala, where Gurruwiwi and his family lived for long stretches when he was a child.

He is also featured in numerous YouTube videos, which attract tens of thousands of views.

== Recognition, influence, and legacy ==
=== Awards ===
Guruwiwi won the 2015 National Indigenous Music Award in the Traditional Song of the Year category, with East Journey, for "Mokuy & Bonba".

=== Yidaki: Didjeridu and the Sound of Australia ===
Gurruwiwi was the main consultant for Yidaki: Didjeridu and the Sound of Australia, an exhibition curated by the South Australian Museum in 2017. This exhibition was dedicated to learning about the power of this instrument and what it meant to the Yolngu people. Not only did it aim to educate people about what the instrument could do, but also to demonstrate how it could communicate to the rest of the world outside of Australia, which was always Gurruwiwi's aim, as he consistently tried to use his instrument and music to bridge the gap between different cultures.

=== Teaching ===
Gurruwiwi spread international master classes to outside continents such as Europe, Asia, and North America. He used to hold annual yidaki workshops at the Garma Festival of Traditional Cultures for advanced students and produced two instructional albums on how to play the instrument.

== See also ==
- List of didgeridoo players
