= Commonwealth v Yunupingu =

2025 Australian High Court decision

- Court: High Court of Australia
- Full case name: Commonwealth of Australia v. Yunupingu (on behalf of the Gumatj Clan or Estate Group) & Ors
- Decided: 12 March 2025
- Citation: [2025] HCA 6

Case history
- Prior action: [2023] FCAFC 75
- Appealed from: Full Court of the Federal Court of Australia

Ruling
- Appeal dismissed

Court membership
- Judges sitting: Chief Justice Stephen Gageler; Justice Michelle Gordon; Justice James Edelman; Justice Simon Steward; Justice Jacqueline Gleeson; Justice Jayne Jagot; Justice Robert Beech-Jones

Commonwealth v Yunupingu, also known as the Gumatj compensation claim, is a 2025 judicial decision of the High Court of Australia relating to Indigenous native title and Australian constitutional interpretation. In the decision on 12 March 2025, the High Court judges dismissed the Commonwealth's appeal from a 2023 Federal Court ruling relating to a claim by the Gumatj clan on the Gove Peninsula in the Northern Territory. The court held that actions of the Commonwealth Government taken before 1975 could give rise to liability for compensation under the Native Title Act 1993, where invalid acquisitions of property had contravened the "just terms" guarantee in Section 51(xxxi) of the Australian Constitution.

The case was commenced by Galarrwuy Yunupingu, a Gumatj leader who died in April 2023, before the High Court appeal was heard, and the claim continued after his death. The proceedings were a significant test of native title, and may provide precedent for other Aboriginal groups to seek compensation for land acquired by the government before 1975.

The High Court did not consider the subject of compensation, and instead returned the case to the Federal Court where it is still undergoing mediation as of November 2026, and likely to take many years.

== Background ==
Location of the Gove Peninsula in Australia

Between the 1930s and 1960s, the Australian Commonwealth Government gave mining exploration leases to various companies to mine bauxite (aluminium ore) on the Gove Peninsula, the traditional lands of a number of clans of Yolŋu people. After French company GOMINCO started its explorations near the Yirrkala mission, the clans whose traditional lands were affected worked together to oppose the mining leases, as they felt they had not been adequately consulted by the government. The move led to the Yirrkala bark petitions being presented to Parliament in 1963, as well as subsequent legal actions. After GOMINCO pulled out, Nabalco began operations in the area. Later, the lease was transferred to Swiss Aluminium and began operating under Rio Tinto.

In 1971, the first case to consider Aboriginal land rights was decided. Milirrpum v Nabalco Pty Ltd, often referred to as the "Gove land rights case", was brought by the Yolŋu people in the Supreme Court of the Northern Territory. They claimed that Aboriginal people held a "communal native title" to the land that was still valid, as it had not been extinguished by the Land Acquisition Act 1955 (Cth), and was therefore still a valid property right. The doctrine of terra nullius (Note: Terra nullius is a Latin expression meaning "nobody's land", and a legal concept used by a state to claim territory. The High Court of Australia rejected the applicability of terra nullius in regard to the colonisation of Australia in the 1992 Mabo case.) was not considered in this case, and it was found against the claimants. Incidentally, Galarrwuy Yunupingu was the court interpreter for this case, 48 years before bringing his own motion.

The rejection of Aboriginal native title established in Milirrpum was overruled in 1992 by Mabo v Queensland (No 2), commonly referred to as the "Mabo decision" or simply "Mabo". In this case the doctrine of terra nullius was rejected and Aboriginal native title was recognised by Australian law. This decision was codified in the Native Title Act 1993.

In 2019, Galarrwuy Yunupingu AM, an elder of the Gumatj clan, brought an Aboriginal title claim on behalf of his clan, to the Full Court of the Federal Court of Australia. Yunupingu died in April 2023, and the claim continued after his death. The plaintiffs sought compensation of $700 million for the damage caused to their land rights by Australian Commonwealth laws and actions in taking the land, under the Native Title Act 1993 (NTA). The claim sought financial compensation for land acquired by the Commonwealth in the Gove Peninsula in northeast Arnhem Land for bauxite mining purposes in the 1950s and 60s.

== Federal Court (2023) ==
The 2019 claim itself is a complicated case and has not been resolved; however, the constitutional issues relating to the case were considered by the Full Federal Court in 2023, in Yunupingu on behalf of the Gumatj Clan or Estate Group v Commonwealth of Australia.

The case was heard in 2023, when the Federal Court was asked to hand down a decision which related to where native title and constitutional law converge. The Court considered a wide range of issues, including questions of extinguishment and the operation of the Native Title Act, as well as constitutional questions. In particular, the Court considered whether native title rights are equivalent to property rights for the purposes of section 51(xxxi) of the Australian Constitution.

The court ruled in Yunupingu's favour in May 2023, reaching two significant conclusions:

- The restriction in section 51(xxxi) – that acquisitions of property must be on just terms – also applies to laws made under section 122 ("the territories power")
- Native title rights are not "inherently defeasible", or susceptible to extinguishment by the Crown; native title rights may be "acquired" within the meaning of s 51(xxxi).

This means that native title holders are entitled to compensation "on just terms" for property acquired by the Commonwealth Government prior to 1975.

The arguments put forth by the Aboriginal parties were complex, but centred on rebutting the Commonwealth's claim that the laws used to extinguish native title did not activate the "just terms" requirement of section 51(xxxi) of the Australian Constitution, as they were not categorised as "acquisition of land". The Aboriginal parties claimed that the ordinances issued by the Commonwealth had the effect of "acquiring land", despite them being issued before the Northern Territory (Self Government) Act 1978.

Kathrine Galloway of Griffith Law School and Melissa Castan of Monash University Faculty of Law, in their 2023 paper, characterised the case as a land rights case that has constitutional dimensions, writing that the State often uses the same three legal themes in arguments to deny claims to land by Indigenous people, and "contend that this case reveals consequences arising from Aboriginal and Torres Strait Islander land claims that speak more broadly to a constitutional order including the standing of First Peoples before the law", and suggest the State should "adopt a more principled strategy in its engagements with First Peoples concerning land".

UNSW Sydney lecturer Ashleigh Barnes argues in a 2024 article in the Sydney Law Review that "The principles of stare decisis as applied to constitutional precedent are a centrepiece of the submissions" in this case. In the same issue, law professors Lael Weis and Rosalind Dixon discuss the possible interpretations of the term "on just terms".

Daniel Lavery, an adjunct research fellow at the College of Business, Law and Governance at James Cook University, wrote that the Commonwealth, in its bid for leave to appeal, had argued the Mabo decision, based on common law, "was susceptible to an exercise of the radical title of the Crown without any duty to pay compensation". Lavery wrote: "Although a simple yes or no is all that is required to answer whether native title is property within s 51(xxxi), at another level it calls into question the still-unsettled terms of the legal relationship between the Crown and the Indigenous peoples of Australia."

== Commonwealth v Yunupingu (2025) ==
The Commonwealth appealed to the High Court, specifically on three Constitutional issues; other issues determined earlier by the Federal Court were not included. The High Court considered only three questions of law on appeal.

The High Court upheld the original decision of the Federal Court of Australia, decided on 12 March 2025. It found the early pastoral leases did not remove any non-exclusive native title rights over minerals, meaning the Gumatj continued to have their rights until legislation was passed and mining leases were granted. This case not only confirms the 2023 precedent, but formally expands the circumstances by which native title holders will be able to claim compensation from the Commonwealth for previous decisions that had damaged their rights to native title.

Three main issues were debated before the High Court, which were slightly different from the Federal Court arguments:

- whether the guarantee of "just terms" guarantee for acquiring property (per section 51(xxxi)) applies to laws made for territories (under section 122)
- whether a legislative "extinguishment" of native title before the commencement of the 1993 NTA constitutes an acquisition of property under section 51(xxxi)
- whether the grant of a pastoral lease in 1903 had extinguished any non-exclusive native title rights over minerals

The High Court appeal was based only on these three constitutional questions, compared to the wider scope of the 2023 Federal Court case.

The Commonwealth argued that native title rights were "inherently fragile" and unlike other property rights. telling the High Court that it does not owe compensation for removal of native title rights because those rights are "inherently defeasible", meaning that it can be cancelled - that is, the rights could not be transferred and acquired by the Commonwealth. It argued that the "just terms" guarantee did not apply, as the "reservation" of the mineral rights for the Crown was done before the Constitution was created, and therefore the Crown had valid ownership of the land.

== Follow-up ==
The matter of how much compensation, and to whom it should be paid, was not included in the judgment, and it is likely to be some years before agreement is reached. In consideration of the Gumatj claim for compensation of $700 million under the NTA, mediation overseen by an experienced retired Federal Court Judge and a Federal Court Registrar began in August 2025, to try to reach agreement among various Indigenous parties to identify those who hold native title to the claim areas. Though mediation was expected to be completed by January 2026, it is still ongoing and the full resolution of the claims is likely to take many years.

== Significance ==
The case is one of the most significant tests of native title, along with Mabo and Northern Territory v Mr Griffiths and Lorraine Jones, commonly known as the 'Timber Creek case'. It had long been understood that native title holders are entitled to compensation where rights were extinguished or impaired after the commencement of the Racial Discrimination Act 1975 (31 October 1975), but often assumed that it would not apply to acts taken before that. However, the Gumatj case has established that compensation claims against the Commonwealth for actions taken before 1975, when that was not done on "just terms", which was nearly always the case before Mabo.

The decision may provide for potential actions by other native title holders to seek compensation from the Commonwealth Government for acquiring native title land elsewhere in Australia. It does not apply to state governments, only the territories administered by the Commonwealth Government, such as the Northern Territory and the Australian Capital Territory (and limited to acts done by the Commonwealth before 1978 and 1988 respectively). It affects only land owned by the Crown, not private land.

== See also ==
- Australian constitutional law
- Indigenous land rights in Australia
- Native title in Australia
- Love v Commonwealth (2020)
- Mabo v Queensland (No 2) (1992)
- Milirrpum v Nabalco Pty Ltd (Gove land rights case, 1971)
