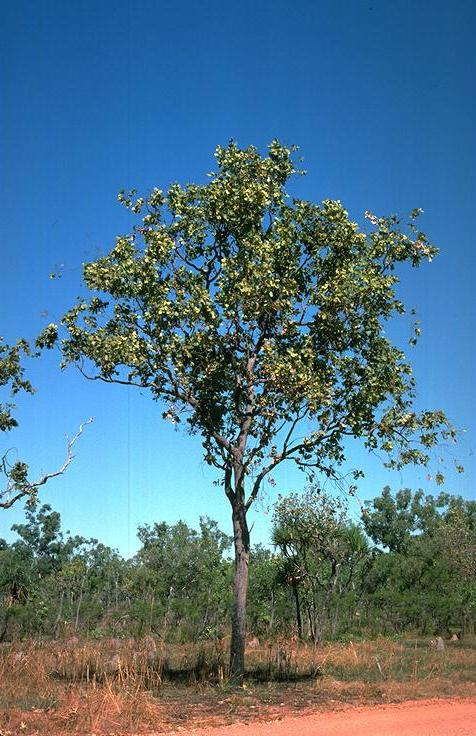
- Corymbia ferruginea at Kakadu

Scientific classification
- Kingdom: Plantae
- Clade: Embryophytes
- Clade: Tracheophytes
- Clade: Spermatophytes
- Clade: Angiosperms
- Clade: Eudicots
- Clade: Rosids
- Order: Myrtales
- Family: Myrtaceae
- Genus: Corymbia
- Species: C. ferruginea

Binomial name
- Corymbia ferruginea (Schauer) K.D.Hill & L.A.S.Johnson

Synonyms
- Eucalyptus ferruginea Schauer

= Corymbia ferruginea =

Rusty bloodwood

Species of plant

Corymbia ferruginea, commonly known as rusty bloodwood, is a species of tree that is endemic to northern Australia. It has rough, tessellated bark on the trunk and branches, a crown of sessile juvenile leaves, flower buds in groups of three or seven, pale creamy yellow flowers and urn-shaped fruit.

== Description ==
Corymbia ferruginea is a straggly tree that typically grows to a height of 3–12 m (9.8–39.4 ft) and forms a lignotuber. Young plants and coppice regrowth have more or less sessile, rusty green, hairy, broadly lance-shaped to egg-shaped or elliptical leaves that are 60–140 mm (2.4–5.5 in) long and 25–70 mm (0.98–2.76 in) wide. The leaves in the crown of the tree are juvenile leaves that are the same shade of dull green on both sides, with brown hairs along the veins, broadly lance-shaped to egg-shaped or elliptical, 63–180 mm (2.5–7.1 in) long and 30–90 mm (1.2–3.5 in) wide and sessile or on a petiole up to 8 mm (0.31 in) long. The flower buds are arranged on the ends of branchlets of a branched, densely hairy, rusty brown peduncle 4–35 mm (0.16–1.38 in) long, each branch of the peduncle with three or seven buds. The buds are sessile or on pedicels up to 5 mm (0.20 in) long. Mature buds are oval to pear-shaped, 7–14 mm (0.28–0.55 in) long and 5–8 mm (0.20–0.31 in) wide with a rounded operculum. Flowering occurs from January to April and the flowers are pale creamy yellow. The fruit is a woody urn-shaped capsule 18–33 mm (0.71–1.30 in) long and 15–29 mm (0.59–1.14 in) wide with the valves enclosed in the fruit.

== Taxonomy and naming ==
Rusty bloodwood was first formally described in 1843 by Johannes Conrad Schauer in Walpers' book Repertorium Botanices Systematicae and given the name Eucalyptus ferruginea. In 1995, Ken Hill and Lawrie Johnson changed the name to Corymbia ferruginea.

In the same journal, Hill and Johnson described two subspecies and the names are accepted by the Australian Plant Census:

- Corymbia ferruginea (Schauer) K.D.Hill & L.A.S.Johnson subsp. ferruginea;
- Corymbia ferruginea subsp. stypophylla K.D.Hill & L.A.S.Johnson that differs from the autonym in having small leaves with petioles more than 12 mm (0.47 in) long.

== Distribution and habitat ==
Corymbia ferruginea grows in open forest and woodland on shallow, sandstone soils or deep sands from west of Fitzroy Crossing in Western Australia then east through the northern part of the Northern Territory to south of Burketown in north-west Queensland.

== See also ==
- List of Corymbia species
