= Marika =

Marika is a both a given name and surname. As a feminine given name, it is of Hungarian and Greek origin; a diminutive of Maria. Apart from Hungary and Greece, the name is also found in North Macedonia, Czechia, Estonia, Finland, Japan, Sweden, Slovakia and Poland.

In Fiji, it is a masculine given name.

Marika is also a surname of the Aboriginal Australian peoples of Arnhem Land known as the Yolŋu, pertaining to the Rirratjiŋu clan.

== People with the given name ==
- Marika (born 1980), Polish singer, songwriter and radio DJ
- Marika Aba (1929–1972), Hungarian-American dancer and journalist
- Marika Bakewell (born 1985), Canadian curler
- Marika Bangó (born 1966), Hungarian singer, lyricist and composer
- Marika Bergman-Lundin (born 1999), Swedish footballer
- Marika Carlsson (born 1973), Swedish standup comedian and TV-personality
- Marika Domanski-Lyfors (born 1960), Swedish footballer and coach
- Marika Domińczyk (born 1980), Polish-American actress
- Marika Eensalu (born 1947), Estonian opera singer and music pedagogue
- Marika Filippidou (born 1877-?), Greek actress
- Marika Gombitová (born 1956), Slovak pop singer
- Marika Green (born 1943), Swedish-French actress
- Marika Hackman (born 1992), English nu-folk singer/songwriter
- Marika Hara (born 1986), Finnish mountain bike orienteer
- Marika Hayashi (林 真里花; born 1975), Japanese actress and voice actress
- Marika Kilius (born 1943), German pair skater
- Marta "Marika" Kosakowska (born 1980), Polish singer
- Marika Kōno (born 1994), Japanese voice actress and singer
- Marika Koroibete (born 1992), Fijian international rugby league and rugby union footballer
- Marika Kotopouli (1887–1954), Greek actress
- Marika Krevata (1910–1994), Greek actress
- Marika Krook (born 1972), Finnish singer and actress
- Marika Labancz (born 1978), Hungarian alpine skier
- Marika Lagercrantz (born 1954), Swedish actress
- Marika Latianara (1913–1983), Fijian boxer, chief and politician
- Marika Lehtimäki (born 1975), Finnish ice hockey player
- Marika Lejon (born 1984), Norwegian composer and singer
- Marika Lichter (born 1949), Austrian singer and actress
- Marika Lindholm (born 1948), Finnish sprinter
- Marika Lindström (born 1946), Swedish actress
- Marika Lõoke (born 1951), Estonian architect
- Marika Matsumoto (born 1984), Japanese actress
- Marika Mikkola (born 1971), Finnish orienteer
- Marika Mitsotakis (1930–2012), Greek cookbook writer
- Marika Nezer (1906–1989), Greek actress
- Marika Ninou (1918–1957), Greek rembetiko singer
- Marika Papagika (1890–1943), Greek singer
- Marika Popowicz-Drapała (born 1988), Polish track and field sprinter
- Marika Rökk (1913–2004), Hungarian-German actress and singer
- Marika Shaw, Canadian violist and violinist
- Marika Sherwood (1937–2025), Hungarian-born historian, researcher, educator and author
- Marika Siewert, Canadian singer-songwriter
- Marika Sila (born 1992), Canadian actress and social activist
- Marika Stiernstedt, (1875–1954), Swedish author and artist
- Marika Takeuchi (born 1987), Japanese composer and pianist
- Marika Teini (born 1989), Finnish orienteer
- Marika Trettin (born 1983), German curler
- Marika Tuliniemi (born 1974), Finnish shot putter
- Marika Tuus-Laul (born 1951), Estonian politician
- Marika Vakacegu (born 1981), Fijian rugby union footballer
- Marika Vaarik (born 1962), Estonian actress
- Marika Vila (born 1949), Spanish comics artist and writer; feminist sociologist
- Marika Vunibaka (born 1974), Fijian rugby union player
- Marika Davydova (born 2004), Dog lover

== People with the surname ==
The surname Marika is a surname of a clan of an Aboriginal Australian people, the Yolngu of Arnhem Land in the Northern Territory. The Marika clan has close links with the Yunupingu and Gurruwiwi families. Some notable people bearing the name include:

- Banduk Marika (1954–2021), artist and activist (daughter of Mawalan 1)
- Banula Marika, aka David, dancer with Bangarra Dance Theatre, Yothu Yindi member (from 1993) (son of Roy, brother of Raymattja)
- Bayulma Marika, child actor in the film Banduk (1985)
- Bunimburr Marika, didgeridoo player and member of Yothu Yindi (from 1993)
- Dhuwarrwarr Marika (born c.1946), artist (daughter of Mawalan 1)
- Kathy Balngayngu Marika (born 1957), dancer
- Mathaman Marika (c. 1920–1970), artist (brother of Mawalan 1, Roy and Milirrpum)
- Mawalan Marika (c.1908-1967), aka Mawalan 1 Marika, artist (father of Banduk, Dhuwarrwarr and Wandjuk)
- Mawalan Marika (born 1957), aka Mawalan 2 Marika (son of Wandjuk)
- Milirrpum Marika (c. 1923–1983), artist, known for the Gove land rights case in 1971 (brother of Mawalan 1, Mathaman and Roy)
- Raymattja Marika (c.1959–2008), educator, linguist and activist (daughter of Roy, sister of Banula)
- Roy Dadaynga Marika (c.1925–1993), artist and Indigenous rights activist (brother of Mawalan 1, Mathaman and Milirrpum)
- Wandjuk Marika (1927–1987), artist, actor and activist (son of Mawalan 1)
- Witiyana Marika, musician and elder, founding member of Yothu Yindi (father of Yirrmal)younger brother of Raymattja Marika
- Yalmay Marika Yunupingu (born 1956), artist and teacher-linguist at Yirrkala Community Education Centre (daughter of Mathaman)
- Yirrmal Marika (born 1993), singer and songwriter, known professionally as Yirrmal (son of Witiyana)
