= Dhuwarrwarr Marika =

Australian contemporary indigenous artist (born 1946)

- Born: 1946 (age 78–79); Yirrkala, Northern Territory, Australia
- Other names: Banuminy
- Known for: Contemporary Indigenous Australian art, bark painting, printmaking
- Father: Mawalan 1 Marika
- Relatives: Wandjuk Marika (brother), Banduk Marika (sister), Bayngul Marika (sister); Laklak Marika (sister)
- Family: Marika Family

Dhuwarrwarr Marika (born 1946), also known as Banuminy, a female contemporary Aboriginal artist. She is a Yolngu artist and community leader from East Arnhem Land in the Northern Territory of Australia. She belongs to the Dhuwa moiety of the Rirratjingu clan in the homeland of Yalangbara, daughter of Mawalan Marika. Marika is an active bark painter, carver, mat maker, and printmaker.

== Early life ==
Dhuwarrwarr Marika, also known as Banuminy, was born in 1946 in Yirrkala, in the East Arnhem Land area of the Northern Territory. She is a member of the Rirratjingu, Miliwurrwurr group and their language is Dhangu. She is part of the Dhuwa moiety. Dhuwarrwarr Marika is the daughter of Mawalan Marika, who was the leader of the Rirratjingu people, one of the contributors to the Yirrkala bark petitions, and the founder of the Marika artistic dynasty. Her siblings are Wandjuk Marika (brother), Banduk Marika (sister), Bayngul, and Laklak. Dhuwarrwarr learnt how to paint from her father, which was unconventional at the time. She learned the art of basketry from her mother and aunt. Her father allowed for her to help him with his painting towards the end of his life, when his health was slowly deteriorating. After consultation with his sons, brothers, and other community elders, Dhuwarrwarr was authorised to paint alongside her father, including the painting of sacred designs. After the death of her father, she took a break from painting and when she expressed interest in continuing, she requested permission from her brothers once again.

She is believed by many (including Howard Morphy and herself) to be the first Yolngu woman to be given permission to paint sacred designs on her own.

== Career ==
After graduating from school, Marika worked as a nurse in Yirrkala, Darwin and Sydney before returning home and developing her artistic skills. Her earliest recorded paintings were completed in the 1970s.

Over time, she has become more active in bark painting, carving, mat making, and printmaking. Her work has been included in numerous group exhibitions around the world from the 1980s onwards, including Australia, the United States, the United Kingdom, and Canada. She has also exhibited work in one solo exhibition, which sold out in a matter of five minutes, titled “Milngurr - Sacred Spring” at the Vivien Anderson Gallery in Melbourne in 2008.

In 1999, together with sisters Gaymala and Gulumbu Yunupingu, Marika was engaged to paint a large film set for the film Yolngu Boy, based on the historic Yirrkala Church Panels.

Marika has produced murals for community buildings at Yirrkala, for Darwin Airport, the Batchelor Institute of Indigenous Tertiary Education, and the Atherton School in Queensland.

Her artistic style combines Rirratjingu sacred designs from her father with more contemporary elements. The mediums that she often uses include earth pigments on stringybark, earth pigments on stringybark hollow poles, pandanus and natural dyes, earth pigments on native hibiscus, earth pigments on ironwood, and print making.

She has created numerous prints at the Yirrkala Print Space at the Buku-Larrnggay Mulka Centre. At the Yirrkala Print Space, Marika works alongside other female artists. She considers her artwork as a means of passing her culture to the next generations and a way of sharing her culture with the outside world.

== Political involvement ==
Marika is an executive member and women's council representative for the Northern Land Council. Marika and other members of her family, who were passionate advocates for Indigenous rights, became involved in the Gove Land Rights Case of 1971. This case eventually led to the passing of the first land rights legislation in Australia.

As a senior statesperson for her people, Marika has participated in numerous local and national committees. In 1993, she was invited to Europe as a speaker for the opening of the international travelling exhibition Aratjara - Art of the First Australians.

== Collections ==
Marika's work is featured in major public collections across the world, including:

- Kluge-Ruhe Aboriginal Art Collection of the University of Virginia
- National Gallery of Victoria, Melbourne
- National Gallery of Australia, Canberra
- Art Gallery of New South Wales, Sydney
- Berndt Museum of Anthropology at the University of Western Australia, Perth
- Museum and Art Gallery of the Northern Territory, Darwin
- South Australian Museum, Adelaide
- Australian Capital Equity Collection, Perth
- Nahum Gutman Museum of Art, Tel Aviv, UK
- Kerry Packer Collection
- Kelton Foundation Collection, Santa Monica, USA

== Significant exhibitions ==
- "The Painters of the Wagilag Sisters Story 1937 - 1997" at the National Gallery of Australia
- "Balnnhdurr - A Lasting Impression" - Touring Exhibition
- "Saltwater Country - Bark Paintings from Yirrkala" - A National Tour in Australia
- "Milngurr - The Sacred Spring" at the Vivien Anderson Gallery
- Tarnanthi 2019/20 at the Art Gallery of South Australia
- "Buku-Larrŋgay Mulka: Mittji" (2019), at the Hugo Michell Gallery
- "Grey Areas" (2017) Rebecca Hossack Art Gallery NYC

== Awards ==
- 1990: Professional Development grant, from the Aboriginal Arts Unit of the Australia Council for the Arts
