= Where the Green Ants Dream =

1984 West German film

- Theatrical release poster
- Directed by: Werner Herzog
- Written by: Werner Herzog; Bob Ellis (Note: additional dialogue)
- Produced by: Lucki Stipetic
- Starring: Bruce Spence
- Cinematography: Jörg Schmidt-Reitwein
- Edited by: Beate Mainka-Jellinghaus
- Music by: Wandjuk Marika (didjeridu)
- Release date: 1984
- Running time: 100 minutes
- Country: West Germany
- Language: English

Where the Green Ants Dream (German: Wo die grünen Ameisen träumen) is a 1984 English-language West German film directed and co-written by Werner Herzog, made in Australia. Based on a true story about Indigenous land rights in Australia, but slated as a mixture of fact and fiction, it only got a limited release in Australia, where it was not well received by critics; the film fared a bit better in Europe and North America.

== Plot ==
Lance Hackett, a geologist for Ayers Mining Company, has identified a promising location to search for uranium in the Outback near Coober Pedy, South Australia. Explosives are to be used to analyze the "geological substructure of the region", so the local Aboriginal people block the work, as they claim the area is where the green ants dream, and that disturbing the ants will destroy humanity. Hackett finds himself the intermediary between his employer and the tribe, and becomes increasingly sympathetic to the indigenous worldview and cause.

Baldwin Ferguson, an executive vice-president of Ayers, is unable to sway the tribal elders with either a trip to Melbourne or the gift of a large, green military airplane that they ask for. The case goes to trial, and the judge decides in favor of the mining company.

Two of the tribal elders take to spending their days sitting in the airplane, and one, Dayipu, is in it when Watson, a younger member of the tribe who learned to fly in the air force, takes it up to prove he can. The plane does not have much fuel, and Watson, who is drunk, crashes in the hills. Ayers begins their work, drilling test holes and setting off small explosives, but Hackett quits and goes to live in an old water tank offered to him by another white man who was profoundly affected by studying the local Aboriginal culture.

== Cast ==
- Bruce Spence as Lance Hackett, a geologist for Ayers Mining
- Wandjuk Marika as Miliritbi, the "keeper of the song"
- Roy Marika as Dayipu, a tribal elder
- Ray Barrett as Cole, a short-fused mining engineer
- Norman Kaye as Baldwin Ferguson, (Note: cf. Walter Baldwin Spencer) an executive vice-president of Ayers Mining
- Ralph Cotterill as Fletcher, a eccentric authority on green ants
- Nicolas Lathouris as Arnold, an irritable, reclusive authority on the local Aborigines
- Basil Clarke as Judge Blackburn
- Ray Marshall as Solicitor General Coulthard
- Dhungala I. Marika as Malila "The Mute"
- Gary Williams as Watson, an Aborigine who says he was "the only...black pilot in the air force"
- Tony Llewellyn-Jones as Fitzsimmons, a minister with an Aboriginal congregation
- Robert Brissenden as Professor Stanner, an expert witness who testifies about Aboriginal culture
- Bob Ellis as the manager of the supermarket
- Michael Edols as the attorney for the plaintiffs
- Max Fairchild as the frustrated police officer looking for the plane by helicopter
- Hugh Keays-Byrne as a mining executive at the trial
- Paul Cox as the photographer who documents the giving of the plane
- James Ricketson as Philip Adams, one of Ayers Mining's lawyers
- Colleen Clifford as Miss Strehlow, (Note: cf. Ted Strehlow) an elderly woman whose dog is lost in the mines

== Production ==
Based partly on the Milirrpum v Nabalco Pty Ltd ("Gove land rights") case about Indigenous land rights on the Gove Peninsula in Arnhem Land, Northern Territory, the film is a mix of fact and fiction. The green ant mythology is Herzog's own invention, but some First Nations peoples did consider the green ant to be a totem animal that created the world and humans. Wandjuk Marika noted that the ant Dreaming belief existed in a clan that lived near Oenpelli in the Northern Territory.

Herzog made use of professional actors, as well as Aboriginal activists from the Northern Territory who were involved in the Milirrpum case and local Aboriginal people from the main filming location, the desert town of Coober Pedy, South Australia. Filming also took place in and near Melbourne, Victoria.

Wandjuk Marika, recommended to Herzog by Phillip Adams, was a leader of the Rirratjingu clan of the Yolngu people, and an artist and musician who was involved in activism for Aboriginal rights. His didgeridoo music is used in the movie, and several members of his family were also cast in the film. The contract with Herzog allowed the Marikas to make enough money to move from Yirrkala to their ancestral region of Yalangbara (aka Port Bradshaw).

== Reception ==
Critics of the film found it uncomfortably placed between a documentary and a feature film. Australian Film Commission chairman Phillip Adams was particularly incensed, feeling the film implied that the Australian Government was against Aboriginal peoples, and wrote an article titled "Dammit Herzog, you are a Liar!"

Filmnews viewed the film's characters as overly stereotypical, "banal caricatures lost in the fog of Herzog's European arthouse auteurism", but said it made "a positive contribution to the present discourse of Aboriginal land rights". Sandra Hill in The Bulletin found the film's ending and anti-consumerist messages to be "high-minded".

The film was generally poorly-reviewed in Australia and did not get a wide release there. It did not do as well in Germany as Herzog's previous films, but his name and reputation were able to get it a wide release in North America and Europe.

== Film festivals and accolades ==
The film was entered in the 1984 Cannes Film Festival, but did not win any awards. It appeared as an official selection at the Toronto International Film Festival, the Thessaloniki Film Festival, Montreal's Festival du nouveau cinéma, and the Moscow International Film Festival, but was not selected for inclusion in either the Sydney Film Festival or the Melbourne International Film Festival.

At the 1984 German Film Awards, the film won a Silver award in the Outstanding Feature Film category and a Gold award for Best Cinematography. Additionally, in March 1985 it was chosen as the film of the United Nations International Conference of Constitutional Rights in Quebec City.

On the review aggregator website Rotten Tomatoes, 80% of 5 critics' reviews are positive, with an average rating of 6.3/10.
