= Wandjuk Marika =

Yolngu artist and activist (1927–1987)

Wandjuk Marika OBE
- Born: 1927
- Died: 16 June 1987 (aged 56–57)
- Monuments: Wandjuk Marika 3D Memorial Award
- Other names: Wandjuk Djuwakan Marika, MBE, Eldest Son of Mawalan, Wondjuk, Wanjug, Wondjug, Djuakan
- Known for: Painting, Indigenous Australian art
- Children: 3, including Mawalan 2 Marika
- Father: Mawalan 1 Marika
- Relatives: Banduk Marika (sister), Dhuwarrwarr Marika (sister)

Wandjuk Djuwakan Marika OBE (c.1927 or 1930 – 16 June 1987), was an Aboriginal Australian painter, actor, composer and Indigenous land rights activist. He was a member of the Rirratjingu clan of the Yolngu people of north-east Arnhem Land in the Northern Territory of Australia, and the son of Mawalan 1 Marika.

== Early life ==
Wandjuk Djuakan Marika was born in 1927 (or 1930) on Bremer Island (Dhambaliya) in the Northern Territory. He was the eldest son of Mawalan 1 Marika and his wife Bamatja, and the brother of Banduk Marika, Dhuwarrwarr Marika, Bayngul, and Laklak (all sisters). He was a member of the Rirratjingu group of the Yolngu people. During childhood, he travelled throughout Arnhem Land by foot and by canoe. Through his parents, he learned to respect his country and inherited extensive rights to land through his father, who was a clan leader. His father also taught him how to paint. Wandjuk talked extensively about his father's teaching: "I'm the top man's son. Because my father is the most important man... We are the sons who know how to make, where to go, where to find the place"

Marika was educated and learned English at the Methodist Overseas Mission at Yirrkala, which was established in 1935. By the age of 18, he had already been through extensive ceremonial training and had learned a large amount of knowledge about the land and culture.

== Career ==
=== Art ===
Marika's paintings expressed his people's traditional lore and spiritual beliefs, and included Djang'kawu Story (1960) and Birth of the Djang'kawu Children of Yelangbara (1982). Djang'kawu is the founding ancestor of the Rirratjingu in traditional stories, who gave birth to the clan at Yalangbara. He also painted the story of the Wawilak sisters. The expression of these stories was part of his responsibility as a clan leader, and the skills were passed on by his father, Mawalan 1. Marika painted the Djang'kawu story for the Dhuwa side of the Yirrkala Church Panels in 1963. He painted the bottom right most portion of the panel, and his painting serves as the start of the panel. This was a very important painting because the Djung'kawu story is the creation story for the entire Dhuwa moiety.

In a 1974 Marika was distressed to discover that an earlier painting, Sea life (Dreaming of the artist’s mother) (1959) had been turned into a tea towel. He discovered the reproduction in a store in Cairns (which had been manufactured in Holland) when on a trip there. He said at the time: “I was shocked when I walked into that shop, and when I saw it I was shocked and break my heart”. This painting expresses elements of his mother's Warramirri clan Dreaming and he was so distressed by this incident that he stopped painting for years; he said he lost his power to paint. It was then that he realized that Aboriginal artists needed some form of protection. In the Aboriginal News in 1976, Wandjuk wrote "It is not that we object to people reproducing our work, but it is essential that we be consulted first, for only we know if a particular painting is of special sacred significance, to be seen only by certain members of a tribe, and only we can give permission for our works of art to be reproduced."

=== Other work ===
As he had been taught English at the mission school, he used his skills to assist anthropologists such as Charles Mountford and Ronald and Catherine Berndt to understand Yolngu culture. He also used the skills of English to help translate the Bible into the Gumatj language. It also allowed him to help with the creation of the Yirrkala Bark Petitions in 1963.

Once he became an established artist, Marika was recognised as a member of the Aboriginal Arts Advisory Committee of the Australian Council for the Arts between the years 1970 and 1973. Immediately following that period, he co-founded the Aboriginal Arts Board in 1973, and became chairman in 1976, a post he held until 1979. Marika also had a directorial role at Aboriginal Arts and Crafts Pty Ltd, as well as belonging to the Australian Institute of Aboriginal Studies' advisory committee.

In 1971, Marika organised a special ceremony to honour his father, who had been a co-creator and signatory of the Yirrkala bark petitions, and Ian Dunlop created a film of the ceremony, filmed by Dean Semler, called In Memory of Mawalan, which was released in 1983. Marika advised the filmmakers of the significance of the story as they were filming. The background to the film is the story of the Djang’kawu sisters, a Rirratjingu clan creation story that laid out the law for the people, which was ignored when the government gave permission for a bauxite mining company to start developing operations in east Arnhem Land. The battle for land rights by the people of Yirrkala mission led to the Yirrkala bark petitions in 1963 and then the Gove Land Rights Case in 1971, which ruled against them.

As an actor, Marika appeared in the films Where the Green Ants Dream (1984) and Initiation (1987). He also appeared in the television miniseries Women of the Sun. He was both actor and composer in the 1984 German film Where the Green Ants Dream.

He was the author of The Aboriginal Children's History of Australia. Marika also wrote an autobiography with co-author Jennifer Isaacs entitled Wandjuk Marika: Life Story (1995). In this book, he intentionally did not include sacred information that could not be known by children, women, and balanda, understanding that this book was for a public audience and it was his responsibility to protect that sacred knowledge. Marika died in 1987, prior to the book being published, and Isaacs waited the appropriate amount of time (as determined by his community) to publish his work in 1995.

== Activism ==
Marika wrote frequent but unsuccessful letters to the Australian federal government to protest against mining activities on Yolngu lands. In August 1963 he helped to send the first of several bark petitions to the Commonwealth government protesting the decision to grant mining leases on the Gove Peninsula. The Yirrkala bark petition was the first Indigenous document to be officially recognised and accepted by the Australian Parliament.

Following the appropriation of his sacred clan designs on a line of Dutch tea towels, Marika became concerned with the intellectual and cultural property rights of Indigenous Australians. The reproduction of these designs disrespected the sacred knowledge of his people and were being sold primarily for their aesthetic value, rather than a cultural one. Marika lobbied for the creation of the Aboriginal Artists th in 1973 to protect the copyright of Aboriginal artists and Indigenous intellectual property. In an article about him, the Canberra Times wrote that he considered land rights to be the most important aboriginal cause and that he believed the ownership of sacred land remained a significant issue to Aboriginal people.

== Recognition and honours ==
In 1979 he was appointed an Officer of the Order of the British Empire in the Queen's Birthday Honours list.

A photographic portrait of Marika by Juno Gemes (1979) hangs in the National Portrait Gallery in Canberra, and several of his paintings feature in the Art Gallery of New South Wales.

His name was given to the Wandjuk Marika 3D Memorial Award, a category of the prestigious National Aboriginal & Torres Strait Islander Art Award, awarded annually by the Museum and Art Gallery of the Northern Territory.

His art is also featured in the Madayin exhibition which is on tour in the United States from 2022-2025 and encompasses eight decades of artistic production at Yirrkala, from 1935 to the present. His painting titled "The Birth of the Djan'kawu Children at Yalaŋbara" is represented in the exhibition.

== Personal life and death ==
His son Mawalan 2 Marika is also an artist, and his daughter is Rarriwuy Marika. Wandjuk Marika was the uncle of Raymattja Marika. He thought it was very important to instruct his children about their roles and responsibilities in a bicultural world.

Marika died on 16 June 1987.

== See also ==
- Roy Dadaynga Marika (c.1925– 1993)
