= Baralku =

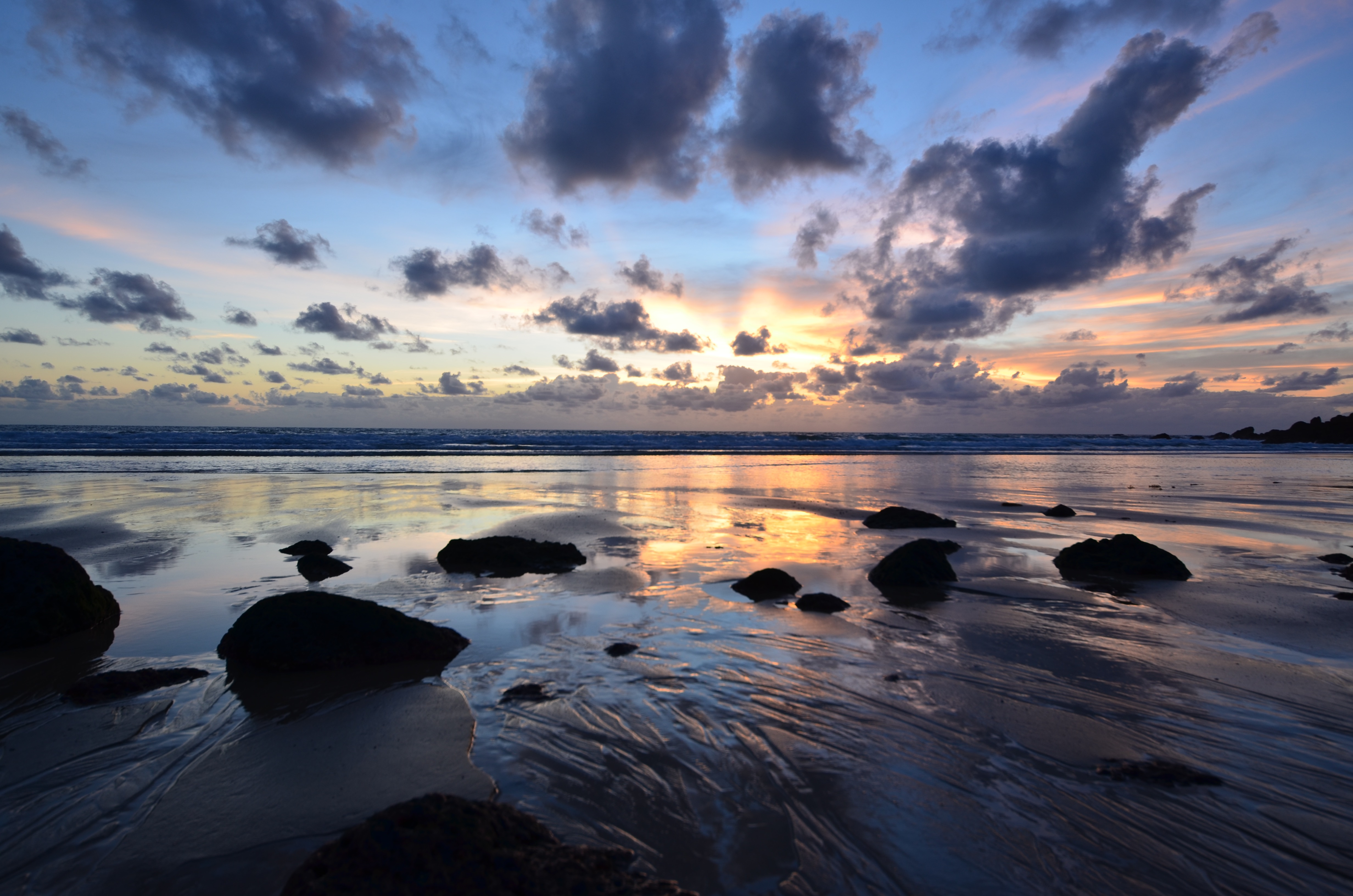
Nhumuy, East Arnhem Land, Northern Territory

Baralku, also written Burralku or Bralgu, is a place connected with creation ancestors in the mythology of the Yolngu people of Arnhem Land in the Northern Territory of Australia. It is referred to as island of the dead, and the place where the ancestors known as Djanggawul (Djan'kawu) originated, before travelling by canoe to Yalangbara, where they gave birth to the Rirratjingu clan.

Baralku is said to lie to the east of Arnhem Land and is where Barnumbirr the creator-spirit (represented by Venus, the Morning Star in Aboriginal astronomy) as she guided the Djanggawul sisters. Barnumbirr is also said to live on the island and rises into the sky as Venus.
