= Dean Semler =

Australian cinematographer and film director

Dean Semler AM ACS ASC
- Born: Dean William Semler; Renmark, South Australia, Australia
- Years active: 1968–2023

Dean William Semler AM is an Australian cinematographer and film director. He won an Academy Award for Best Cinematography for Dances with Wolves, and Australian Film Institute Awards for Best Cinematography for Razorback (1984) and Dead Calm (1989).

== Early life and education ==
Dean William Semler was born in Renmark, and grew up in South Australia.

He later said that the film which made the most impression on him as a child was David Lean's 1946 film of the Charles Dickens novel Great Expectations. He was given small Coronet still camera when he was 14, and took photographs of the landscape.

At the time, there were no film schools in southern Australia, so he had no formal training in photography.

== Career ==
=== 1970s ===
Semler's first work in the production industry was as a camera operator at a local television station. Later, he began making documentary and educational films for Film Australia. He was the cinematographer for A Steam Train Passes (1974), Moving On (1974), Let the Balloon Go (1976), and A Good Thing Going (1978).

In 1971, he worked with ethnographic filmmaker Ian Dunlop at Film Australia to film a special Yolngu ceremony organised by Wandjuk Marika to honour his father, Mawalan Marika, who had been a co-creator and signatory of the Yirrkala bark petitions in 1963, and died in 1967. The ceremony took place after the disappointing result of the Gove Land Rights Case. The resulting film, called In Memory of Mawalan, was released in 1983.

In 1976, he again worked with Dunlop to film the Yolngu Djungguwan ceremony in Arnhem Land. This is an initiation ceremony of the Rirratjingu and Marrakula clans taking several weeks, designed to teach young boys about discipline as well as respect for Yolngu law and traditions. The resulting film, entitled Djungguwan at Gurka’wuy, has been preserved at the National Film and Sound Archive.

=== 1980s ===
Semler was cinematographer on Stepping Out, in 1980. The film was a documentary feature directed and produced by Chris Noonan, about a group of intellectually disabled people who give a performance at the Sydney Opera House.

Semler was the cinematographer on the film Hoodwink (1981) with a screenplay by Ken Quinnell, and in the same year, for Mad Max 2 (1981), which led to international attention for his work. He followed up on Mad Max Beyond Thunderdome (1985). Semler was also a cinematographer for the acclaimed Australian miniseries Bodyline (1984). In the late 1980s, Semler was the cinematographer for several popular films, such as Cocktail (1988), and Young Guns (1988).

=== 1990s ===
In 1989, Semler was hired as cinematographer for Kevin Costner's Dances with Wolves (1990), for which he won an Academy Award for Best Cinematography.

Semler lensed the comedy City Slickers (1991) and the action film Last Action Hero (1993) in the early 1990s. In 1995, Semler again worked with Costner on his film Waterworld. In 1992 Semler was the cinematographer for The Power of One.

=== 2000s ===
In the 2000s, Semler was the cinematographer for a range of movies that included comedies (Nutty Professor II: The Klumps from 2000, and Bruce Almighty from 2003) and action films (XXX from 2002 and The Alamo from 2004). In the mid-2000s, Semler was the cinematographer for the football comedy The Longest Yard (2005) and Just My Luck (2006). In 2006, Semler worked with Mel Gibson again for the film Apocalypto.

== Recognition and honours ==
In 2002 Semler was appointed a Member of the Order of Australia (AM).

He is an accredited member of both the Australian Cinematographers Society and the American Society of Cinematographers.

=== Awards and nominations ===
| Year | Award | Category | Title | Result |
|---|---|---|---|---|
| 1990 | Academy Awards | Best Cinematography | Dances with Wolves | Won |
| 1990 | BAFTA Awards | Best Cinematography | Dances with Wolves | Nominated |
| 1990 | American Society of Cinematographers | Best Cinematography | Dances with Wolves | Won |
| 2006 | American Society of Cinematographers | Best Cinematography | Apocalypto | Nominated |
| 2013 | American Society of Cinematographers | Lifetime Achievement Award | | Won |
| 1980 | Australian Film Institute | Best Cinematography | Mad Max 2 | Nominated |
| 1983 | Australian Film Institute | Best Cinematography | Undercover | Nominated |
| 1984 | Australian Film Institute | Best Cinematography | Razorback | Won |
| 1985 | Australian Film Institute | Best Cinematography | The Coca-Cola Kid | Nominated |
| 1988 | Australian Film Institute | Best Cinematography | The Lighthorsemen | Nominated |
| 1989 | Australian Film Institute | Best Cinematography | Dead Calm | Won |
| 1990 | Chicago Film Critics Association | Best Cinematography | Dances with Wolves | Won |
| 2006 | Chicago Film Critics Association | Best Cinematography | Apocalypto | Won |
| 1990 | Dallas–Fort Worth Film Critics Association | Best Cinematography | Dances with Wolves | Won |
| 2006 | Dallas–Fort Worth Film Critics Association | Best Cinematography | Apocalypto | Won |
| 2010 | Satellite Awards | Best Cinematography | Secretariat | Nominated |

== Filmography ==
=== Feature films ===
Director

- Firestorm (1998)
- The Patriot (1998)

Cinematographer

| Year | Title | Director | Notes |
|---|---|---|---|
| 1974 | Moving On | Richard Mason | |
| 1976 | Let the Balloon Go | Oliver Howes | |
| 1981 | Hoodwink | Claude Whatham | |
| 1981 | Mad Max 2 | George Miller | |
| 1983 | Kitty and the Bagman | Donald Crombie | |
| 1983 | Undercover | David Stevens | |
| 1984 | Razorback | Russell Mulcahy | |
| 1985 | The Coca-Cola Kid | Dusan Makavejev | |
| 1985 | Mad Max Beyond Thunderdome | George Miller; George Ogilvie | |
| 1987 | Bullseye | Carl Schultz | |
| 1987 | Going Sane | Michael Robertson | |
| 1987 | The Lighthorsemen | Simon Wincer | Also camera operator |
| 1988 | Cocktail | Roger Donaldson | |
| 1988 | Young Guns | Christopher Cain | |
| 1989 | Farewell to the King | John Milius | Also camera "A" operator |
| 1989 | Dead Calm | Phillip Noyce | |
| 1989 | K-9 | Rod Daniel | |
| 1990 | Impulse | Sondra Locke | |
| 1990 | Young Guns II | Geoff Murphy | |
| 1990 | Dances with Wolves | Kevin Costner | |
| 1991 | City Slickers | Ron Underwood | |
| 1992 | The Power of One | John G. Avildsen | |
| 1993 | Super Mario Bros. | Rocky Morton; Annabel Jankel | Also 2nd unit director |
| 1993 | Last Action Hero | John McTiernan | |
| 1993 | The Three Musketeers | Stephen Herek | |
| 1994 | The Cowboy Way | Gregg Champion | |
| 1995 | Waterworld | Kevin Reynolds | |
| 1997 | Gone Fishin' | Christopher Cain | |
| 1997 | Trojan War | George Huang | |
| 1999 | The Bone Collector | Phillip Noyce | |
| 2000 | Nutty Professor II: The Klumps | Peter Segal | |
| 2001 | Heartbreakers | David Mirkin | |
| 2002 | D-Tox | Jim Gillespie | |
| 2002 | Dragonfly | Tom Shadyac | |
| 2002 | We Were Soldiers | Randall Wallace | |
| 2002 | XXX | Rob Cohen | |
| 2003 | Bruce Almighty | Tom Shadyac | |
| 2004 | The Alamo | John Lee Hancock | |
| 2005 | The Longest Yard | Peter Segal | |
| 2005 | Stealth | Rob Cohen | |
| 2006 | Just My Luck | Donald Petrie | |
| 2006 | Click | Frank Coraci | |
| 2006 | Apocalypto | Mel Gibson | |
| 2007 | I Now Pronounce You Chuck & Larry | Dennis Dugan | |
| 2008 | Get Smart | Peter Segal | |
| 2008 | Appaloosa | Ed Harris | |
| 2009 | 2012 | Roland Emmerich | |
| 2010 | Date Night | Shawn Levy | |
| 2010 | Secretariat | Randall Wallace | |
| 2011 | In the Land of Blood and Honey | Angelina Jolie | |
| 2012 | Parental Guidance | Andy Fickman | |
| 2013 | Grudge Match | Peter Segal | |
| 2014 | Heaven Is for Real | Randall Wallace | |
| 2014 | Maleficent | Robert Stromberg | |
| 2015 | Paul Blart: Mall Cop 2 | Andy Fickman | |
| 2015 | The Last Witch Hunter | Breck Eisner | |
| 2015 | The Ridiculous 6 | Frank Coraci | |
| 2016 | The Do-Over | Steven Brill | |
| 2017 | Sandy Wexler | Steven Brill | |
| 2019 | Playing with Fire | Andy Fickman | |
| 2026 | Summer Gold | Caroline Zelder | |

Documentary film

| Year | Title | Director | Notes |
|---|---|---|---|
| 1980 | Stepping Out | Chris Noonan | |
| 1983 | In Memory of Mawalan | Ian Dunlop | About Mawalan Marika |

=== Television ===
TV movies

| Year | Title | Director |
|---|---|---|
| 1976 | Do I Have to Kill My Child? | Donald Crombie |
| 1978 | A Good Thing Going | Arch Nicholson |
| 1986 | Passion Flower | Joseph Sargent |
| 1998 | The Clean Machine | Ken Cameron |

TV series

| Year | Title | Director | Notes |
|---|---|---|---|
| 1968–1970 | This Day Tonight | | 10 episodes |
| 1980 | The Russians | Arch Nicholson | Documentary series |
| 1988 | Great Performances | Rodney Fisher | Episode "Melba" |
