= Mawalan Marika (born 1957) =

Australian Indigenous artist

- Born: 1957 (age 67–68)
- Known for: Art, land custodianship, teaching
- Father: Wandjuk Marika
- Relatives: Banduk Marika (aunt)

Mawalan Marika (born 1957), also referred to as Mawalan 2 Marika to distinguish from his grandfather Mawalan 1 Marika (c.1908–1967), is a Yolngu artist and land custodian of Arnhem Land in the Northern Territory of Australia. He is the son of well-known artist and leader Wandjuk Marika, and nephew to Banduk Marika.

His name derives from the mawalan, or digging stick used by the Djang'kawu of the creation story of the Rirratjingu clan. He is (as of 2018) the top male custodian of the clan's law, a responsibility shared with two women of the clan. Mawalan has particular responsibility for the ceremonies associated with the eastern side of the Port Bradshaw peninsula at Yalangbara, known as the "sunrise" side.

Marika produced most of his paintings before the late 1980s. He did, however, create paintings about Yalangbara for the 1999–2000 "Saltwater" touring exhibition mounted by the Buku-Larrnggay Mulka Centre, later acquired by the Australian National Maritime Museum in Sydney. His work is also held in the National Gallery of Australia and the National Museum of Australia in Canberra, the Museum and Art Gallery of the Northern Territory in Darwin, and the University of Virginia's Kluge-Ruhe Aboriginal Art Collection in Charlottesville.

In 2010 he gave an opening address at the Yalangbara: Art of the Djang’kawu exhibition launch at the National Museum of Australia, in which he mentioned his aunt, Banduk Marika (who was largely responsible for the creation of the exhibition), her (unnamed) son, a "great man", and his father Wandjuk. Also at this exhibition, a film made by Ian Dunlop titled In Memory of Mawalan, made in 1971 and released in 1983, was screened. The subject of the film was a ceremony organised by Wandjuk in honour of his father Mawalan, who had died in 1967, before the outcome of the Gove Land Rights Case in 1971.

Apart from his artistic career, Marika has worked in various educational, environmental protection and cultural roles at Yirrkala, and more recently at Sheperdson College on Elcho Island. In 2003, he worked with his aunt, Banduk, and anthropologist Geoffrey Bagshaw, to get Yalangbara listed on the Register of the National Estate.
