= Ian Dunlop (filmmaker) =

Australian documentary filmmaker (1927–2021)

Ian Dunlop OAM
- Born: Ian Craig Dunlop; England
- Education: University of Sydney
- Years active: 1956–2010
- Spouse: 2

Ian Craig Dunlop OAM (1927–2021) was an Australian documentary filmmaker, known for his ethnographic films about Indigenous Australians. He is particularly known for his early work with the Martu desert people of Western Australia, creating the series People of the Australian Western Desert and a feature film Desert People, and his later work with Yolngu people in Yirrkala, in Arnhem Land, in particular the 22 films making up the Yirrkala Film Project. He also contributed greatly to the preservation and organisation of archival documentary film made in Australia.

== Early life and education ==
Ian Craig Dunlop was born in England in 1927. His mother was Australian, and Dunlop settled in Australia after doing his national service in the UK in 1948.

He graduated from the University of Sydney with a bachelor of arts degree, after transferring from his original study choice at the university to be closer to a student who later became his wife, Roey.

== Career ==
For most of his career, after a brief stint with the Australian Broadcasting Corporation, he worked for the Commonwealth Film Unit (CFU; later Film Australia), from 1956 until around 1987.

Dunlop collaborated extensively with editor Pip Deveson, then Philippa Kirk, over around 30 years. Deveson, after a break to rear her children, joined Dunlop on the last 11 films made under the auspices of AIATSIS. Deveson later worked in the Australian National University's Centre for Visual Anthropology. He also collaborated with award-winning cinematographer Dean Semler on at least two films.

=== Desert People ===
His debut film was about the remote Giles Weather Station in the Gibson Desert in Western Australia, where he worked with and filmed Martu people, of the Western Desert cultural bloc. This led him to want to study First Nations Australians on film for the rest of his career, and his work changed the way the CFU framed Aboriginal Australians in their films. It took a while for Dunlop to persuade the CFU to return to the desert to follow up his first film, finally travelling there again in 1965 when the Australian Institute of Aboriginal Studies (AIAS, later AIATSIS) provided funding for him to return in 1965 and 1967 to make ethnographic films. The film unit at AIAS commissioned lot of original film while it was in operation, from 1962 until 1988, which included the production of a 19-part series of films made over the six years, called People of the Australian Western Desert, by Dunlop. The series was produced by John Martin-Jones.

Professional cameraman Richard Howe Tucker, along with recently-qualified young anthropologist Robert Tonkinson, who knew some of the local Aboriginal dialects, set out for three weeks of filming in 1965. Aboriginal guides living on a mission nearby helped with interpretation, while Dunlop and Tucker shot around five hours of film with two Martu families from different language groups (Mandjintjadara and Ngadjadjadjara) group. In 1967 they travelled to a different part of the central Australian desert, where they filmed three related Mandjintjadara families still living a nomadic life. Dunlop and Tucker shot another seven hours of material with this group over three weeks. Most of the footage focuses on making artefacts, gathering food, and hunting (lizards, bandicoots, emus, and kangaroos). Some illustrate therapeutic activities, such as preparing and administering bush medicines. They also filmed some Aboriginal sacred sites, with these parts of the films now being restricted and are only able to be viewed by special permission.

In 1966, Dunlop edited four parts of the series to create a 49-minute film called Desert People. This film was an Australian National Film Board production, produced by the Commonwealth Film Unit for AIAS. Desert People, shot on black and white 35mm film, was screened at many film festivals, including out of competition at the 28th Venice International Film Festival, and won several international prizes. Australian anthropologist Norman Tindale reviews the film for American Anthropologist in 1968, and an article entitled "People of the Australian Western Desert. 1965. A series of nine films in b&w. Directed by Ian Dunlop." by James C. Pierson was published in the same journal in 1986. In 2015, Massimiliano Mollona, who teaches political and economic anthropology and visual art at Goldsmiths College, London, wrote a review of the film for Focaal. Several episodes of the series were later screened at the Cinema Reborn festival in March 2018.

Dunlop distinguished between "record" films and "interpretive" films, most of the series adopting the former model, following a particular process, event, or situation in roughly chronologically sequence, while Desert People follows the latter. Desert People begins in the morning with the Mandjintjadara family setting out on their day's tasks, and ends with the Ngadjadjadjara family settling down next to fires at night. Although shot over two or three weeks, the film is presented as if occurring over three or four days. Dunlop's second "interpretive" film, At Patantja Claypan, was based on material shot during the 1967 expedition over two weeks as if it were two consecutive days in the life of this Mandjintjadara group. This 53-minute film was released as part of the main series in 1969.

=== Yirrkala ===
Later in his career, Dunlop filmed extensively over 12 years at the Yolngu community at Yirrkala in eastern Arnhem Land, forming close working relationships with leaders and artists there, including Narritjin Maymuru, Dundiwuy Wanambi, and Mawalan Marika (all of whom had had involvement in the Yirrkala bark petitions; Dundiwuy had been a signatory). Dunlop was respected by artist and land rights activist Roy Marika, who explained the importance of his films to other Yolngu elders. Dunlop left 27 of his films with the community. Artist and clan leader Mithili Wanambi, father of Wukun Wanambi, became a close collaborator in the 1970s. The Yirrkala Film Project was the name given to a series of 22 films, running for 1,271 minutes in total, filmed between 1970 and 1982. Among these films is Baniyala (released 1996), showing "the 1974 lifestyle of the Madarrpa people of Baniyala on Blue Mud Bay".

Dunlop made In Memory of Mawalan, a black and white film with cinematography by Dean Semler and sound by Bob Hays, in 1971 (released 12 years later). The background to the film is the story of the Djang’kawu sisters, a Rirratjingu clan creation story that laid out the law for the people, which was ignored when the government gave permission for a bauxite mining company to start developing operations in east Arnhem Land. The battle for land rights by the people of Yirrkala mission led to the Yirrkala bark petitions in 1963 and then the Gove Land Rights Case in 1971, which ruled against them. Artist and elder Mawalan Marika, who had been a creator of and signatory to the petitions, died in 1967. In 1971, his eldest son Wandjuk Marika planned a ceremony as a celebration of his father and as a re-affirmation of Djang’kawu Law, and In Memory of Mawalan is a film of the ceremony. Wandjuk documented the film for the filmmakers as they were filming. The film was released in 1983 and is available as a DVD from NFSA. The film was later screened at the National Museum of Australia in Canberra in conjunction with the exhibition Yalangbara: art of the Djang’kawu in August–September 2011.

==== Djungguwan ceremony ====
In 1963, anthropologist Nic Peterson was the first to document the Yolngu Djungguwan ceremony on film, for AIATSIS. This is a weeks-long initiation ceremony of the Rirratjingu and Marrakula clans, designed to teach young boys about discipline, as well as respect for Yolngu law and traditions. In 1976, Dunlop worked with cinematographer Dean Semler (who later won an Oscar for Dances with Wolves), to again film the ceremony, the resulting film being entitled Djungguwan at Gurka’wuy. In 1987, a restricted archival print of this was made, eight hours long. In 2002, Dunlop collaborated with filmmakers Denise Haslem, Trevor Graham, and his wife Rose Hesp, on a new project, Ceremony: The Djungguwan of Northeast Arnhem Land, produced at the request of and in partnership with the Yirrkala Dhanbul Community Association and the Rirratjingu Association, for Film Australia. In 2003 the ceremony was once again staged at Gurka’wuy and filmed by Kos Tambling.' The NFSA holds the films, and clips from the 1966, 1976 and 2002 films are freely available on their website.

Film Australia released a National Interest Program DVD of Ceremony: The Djungguwan of Northeast Arnhem Land, about the making of the 2002 film, to mark UNESCO World Day for Audiovisual Heritage, and presented to UNESCO for their collection in 2007.

=== Other work ===
In the 1950s, Dunlop made films in Papua New Guinea. In 1969 he was invited by French anthropologist Maurice Godelier to film the initiation ceremony of the Baruya people of the highlands of New Guinea. His films were developed into two major series about the Baruya people, of 9 and 13 hours. The nine-part series was called Towards Baruya Manhood.

After the Australian Institute of Aboriginal Studies and the CFU ceased funding for ethnographic films, around 1985, Dunlop worked on completing unedited films and organising his and others' film archives. He oversaw the preservation and screening of the neglected films of Walter Baldwin Spencer, and served as a member of the NFSA Indigenous Reference Group from 1998 for some years.

In 1996, he undertook a six-month secondment from the NFSA to AIATSIS to manage the film archive, working alongside longtime collaborator, editor Pip Deveson.

He represented Australia at ethnographic film conferences and festivals, and screened Baldwin Spencer's films around the world. He also lectured on the history of ethnographic film in Australia.

== Recognition and honours ==
In 1996, Les McLaren, Annie Stiven made a film about Dunlop for SBS Television, called Taking Pictures.

=== Film awards ===
Dunlop's 1967 film Desert People won the following accolades:

- 1967: Prix Special du Comite Directeur: IX Recontre Cinematographique Internationale de Prades (Prades, France (Ciné-Rencontres de Prades)
- 1967: Diploma of Merit: Edinburgh International Film Festival
- 1967: Golden Bucranium (best film of festival): XII International Festival of Scientific and Educational Films, Padua, Italy
- 1968: Special Citation (out of competition): Australian Film Awards, Australian Film Institute
- 1969: Diploma of Merit: Melbourne Film Festival
- 1969: Blue Ribbon (First Prize in Anthropology and Archaeology section): 11th American Film Festival, New York
- 1971: Golden Decade Award: U.S. Industrial Film Festival, Chicago, 1971.

Conversations with Dundiwuy Wanambi won the Royal Anthropological Institute Film Prize in 1996.

=== Personal awards ===
Dunlop was also the recipient of many personal awards and honours for his work, including:

- 1968: Winner, inaugural Raymond Longford Award from the Australian Film Institute
- 1986: Medal of the Order of Australia in the Australia Day 1986 Honours List, "in recognition of service to the public, particularly in the field of ethnographic film making"
- 1991: Elected honorary fellow of the Royal Anthropological Institute of Great Britain and Ireland
- 2000: Winner, inaugural Gian Paolo Paoli Award for Ethnographic Film at the Festival dei Popoli in Florence, Italy
- 2009: Winner, Ken G Hall Award for services to the preservation of Australian films, awarded by the National Film and Sound Archive (NFSA) to coincide with NAIDOC Week, to recognise Dunlop's "major contribution to the preservation of films of Australian Indigenous communities through his own work and his preservation and protection of the work of others"

== Personal life ==
Dunlop married "Roey", and they had at least two children, a son and a daughter.

They moved to Canberra in 1998 to be closer to their son, who was living there.

== Death and legacy ==
Dunlop died in 2021. The NFSA's tribute on its website says that "Ian has left an incredible legacy and will be greatly missed".

His 1965 series People of the Australian Western Desert, showing as it did nomadic Martu people still living on their own land, as they had done for thousands of years, continue to be viewed by Martu people, proving to be a useful learning tool for younger Martu, to learn about traditional knowledge and culture.

His Yirrkala films, after becoming available on VHS videotapes in 1996, were left for community use in the Buku-Larrnggay Mulka Centre, an art centre and museum. According to Buku director Will Stubbs: "From day one, the place was packed. Demand was intense and constant. This is when we understood the need for the Mulka media centre, where Yolngu could go on to make films of their own today". Some of these films incorporate clips from Dunlop's films. According to filmmaker Trevor Graham, who went to Yirrkala 30 years after Dunlop, Dunlop had become "a legendary figure in their eyes".

Dunlop donated more than 5000 photographs (mostly colour slides) to AIATSIS, comprising stills taken during his work between 1964 and 1982 at various locations.

Upon presentation of the NFSA film preservation award in 2009, CEO Darryl McIntyre said:

A pioneer of modern Australian visual anthropology, Ian documented traditional Aboriginal communities during a period of tremendous change and upheaval, his films helped build a broader awareness of the Aboriginal world view, the land rights movement and the impact of Western culture on the Aboriginal way of life.

Friend and colleague Tom Eccles, who met Dunlop at AIATSIS in 1996, wrote in his obituary on the website in 2021:

Unlike the negative portrayal of Aboriginal communities in mainstream Australian media, the intention of Dunlop’s films was to show a positive side to a homeland and how living on homelands are a means of maintaining a connection to Country and a unique way of life.
