= Dhangu =

Dhangu or Dhaŋu may be,

- Dhangu people
- Dhangu language
- Operation Dhangu
