= Yalangbara, Northern Territory =

Coastal area in East Arnhem Land, Northern Territory, Australia

Yalangbara is a coastal area in the East Arnhem (Miwatj) region of Australia's Northern Territory, around 35 km (22 mi) south of Nhulunbuy, the largest town in the area. It is on the country of the Rirratjingu clan of the Yolŋu people, and is one of the most significant cultural areas for the Yolŋu because of its role in the creation story of the Rirratjingu clan, based on the Djang'kawu ancestors.

In Yolŋu terminology, Yalangbara is a yaku bathala (literally "big name"), a term for a general area that comprises various named localities, comprising the area south of Yirrkala including the Yalangbara Peninsula (also known as the Port Bradshaw Peninsula or Port Bradshaw) as well as Lalawuy Bay, adjacent coastline and the nearby islands such as Wapilina Island. It covers around 210 km^{2} (81 sq mi) of land and coastal waters. However, the name can be applied to different areas, depending upon context; it may refer to the small beach site related to the Djang'kawu myth (see below), or the whole eastern side of the peninsula.

== Geography ==
Yalangbara covers around 210 km^{2} (81 sq mi) of almost untouched land and coastal waters. It lies around 35 km (22 mi) south of Nhulunbuy, the largest town in East Arnhem Land.

The main beach, known as Yalangbara beach (or just Yalangbara, depending on context), is a white sand beach located on Yalangbara Peninsula (also known as the Port Bradshaw Peninsula or Cape Arnhem Peninsula) and faces east into the Gulf of Carpentaria. The community of Bawaka is also located on this peninsula. The area is dominated by one of the largest coastal dune systems in the Northern Territory, at 16 km (9.9 mi) long, up to 2 km (1.2 mi) wide, from 20 m (66 ft) to 80 m (260 ft) high, running down the centre of the peninsula.

Access is via a 22 km (14 mi) bush track from Yirrkala.

== Aboriginal significance ==
Yalangbara lies within the country of the Rirratjingu clan of the Yolŋu people.

In Yolŋu terminology, Yalangbara is a yaku bathala (literally "big name"), a term for a general area that comprises various named localities, comprising the area south of Yirrkala including the Yalangbara Peninsula, aka Port Bradshaw (Peninsula) as well as the nearby islands, Lalawuy Bay and adjacent coastline.

Yalangbara beach is important as the first site the mythical Djang'kawu siblings, two female and one male, reached on the Australian mainland. The sisters were the custodians of ceremonial law, and carried with them their digging sticks (mawalan), feathered headwear and sacred objects hidden in their basket and mats. The objects changed into various landforms along their route, and they created freshwater wells at Yalangbara by plunging their digging sticks into the sand, after which the digging sticks turned into a variety of plant species. There is still freshwater to be found under the sandy beach, and is believed to have healing properties.

A site known as Balma, high among the sand dunes, is of particular significance as it was here that the Djang'kawu sisters gave birth to the first of the Rirratjingu clan. Access to this site is restricted. From Yalangbara the Djang'kawu travelled west, establishing the Dhuwa moiety of the Yolŋu people.

The Marika family, who trace their ancestry to the original Dhuwa moiety, are the traditional owners of the land, and they manage the area's rich biodiversity. They are also custodians of Djang’kawu law, which is expressed in ritual ceremonies and art. Many members of the family started producing paintings when they lived at the Yirrkala mission from 1935 onwards.

The Yalangbara: art of the Djang’kawu touring exhibition, instigated by Banduk Marika and developed with the assistance of other family members and the Museum and Art Gallery of the Northern Territory at Darwin, opened at the National Museum of Australia from 7 December 2010. This was the first major survey exhibition of the Marikas' work, and covers around 50 named sites in the Yalangbara peninsula that were traversed by the Djang’kawu journey. It followed a 2008 monograph of the same name, edited by Margie West and produced in partnership with Banduk Marika and other members of the family. Also at this exhibition, a film made by Ian Dunlop titled In Memory of Mawalan, made in 1971 and released in 1983, was screened. The subject of the film was a ceremony organised by Wandjuk Marika in honour of his father Mawalan Marika, who had died in 1967, before the outcome of the Gove Land Rights Case in 1971. The ceremony and film notes the importance of the law laid out by the Djang’kawu sisters.

=== Heritage listing ===
Yalangbara was registered as an Aboriginal sacred site with the NT's Aboriginal Areas Protection Authority in 1983.

Thanks to the work of Banduk Marika, her nephew Mawalan 2 Marika, anthropologist Geoffrey Bradshaw and others, which included a detailed heritage assessment (2000), Yalangbara was included for listing on the Australian Heritage Commission's Register of the National Estate in 2003. (Note: This must refer to being listed for assessment only, as it still awaiting assessment in 2021.) The Register of the National Estate was frozen in 2007, and as of July 2021 Yalangbara is not yet actually listed under the superseding Commonwealth Heritage List. Under the EPBC Act, the Minister for the Environment "determines which places the Australian Heritage Council will assess for the National Heritage List and Commonwealth Heritage List", and it has been listed for assessment by 30 June 2022. It was added to the "Finalised Priority Assessment List for the National Heritage List for 2018-19", with the area being defined as 19,335 ha (47,780 acres) from Bawaka Road to Port Bradshaw, 22 km (14 mi) south of Yirrkala. Its reasons for inclusion are described as follows:

"Yalangbara may have National Heritage values due to the: Yalangbara sand dunes and the Djang’kawu (Dhuwa moiety foundation story) including in the history and iconography of the Aboriginal land rights movement (Gove case 1963); the importance of the Makassan sites on Wapilina Island in the Yalangbara Peninsula; and the Carpets Case (1993) (Note: The trial actually took place in 1994.) to protect the intellectual property rights of Aboriginal artists' rights from the unauthorised reproduction of traditional Aboriginal designs."

== Flora and fauna ==
The sea provides habitat for rays, shellfish, crustaceans, trepang/beche-de-mer, saltwater crocodiles and many species of fish. There are significant populations of bridled and roseate terns and many other seabirds.

Threatened species including three plant, fourteen vertebrate and one butterfly species have been recorded at Yalangbara.
