= Raymattja Marika =

Aboriginal Australian leader

Raymattja Marika AM
- Born: c.1959
- Died: 11 May 2008; Yirrkala, Northern Territory
- Other name: Gunutjpitt Gunuwanga
- Occupations: Scholar, educator, linguist
- Known for: Director of Reconciliation Australia
- Children: 3
- Parent(s): Roy Marika, Eunice Marika
- Relatives: Wandjuk Marika (uncle)

Raymattja Marika AM, also known as Gunutjpitt Gunuwanga, (c.1959 – 11 May 2008) was a Yolngu leader, scholar, educator, translator, linguist and cultural advocate for Aboriginal Australians. She was a Director of Reconciliation Australia and a member of the Australian Institute of Aboriginal and Torres Strait Islander Studies. She was also a director of the Yothu Yindi Foundation and a participant in the 2020 Summit, which was held in April 2008. Marika advocated understanding and reconciliation between Indigenous Australian and Western cultures.

== Early life and education ==
Marika was born around 1959, the eldest daughter of Eunice and Roy Marika, a prominent leader in the Indigenous Australian land rights movement. She was also the niece of painter and actor Wandjuk Marika (OBE). She was born into the Rirratjingu clan of the Yolngu people, and lived in Yirrkala on the Gove Peninsula in Arnhem Land, Northern Territory. She lost a leg to cancer when she was young.

She earned degrees from the Batchelor Institute of Indigenous Tertiary Education and Melbourne University.

== Activism and career ==
Marika became a scholar, translator, linguist and cultural defender for the rights of Indigenous Australians. Many of her writings appeared in nationwide media, and she lectured throughout Australia. She devoted her professional career to education, and worked to bridge the gap between Australia's Aboriginal peoples, especially her native Yolngu, and the wider English-speaking mainstream society.

She taught at Charles Darwin University in Darwin.

Marika was considered a leading expert of Yolngu customs and languages in north-east Arnhem Land, including the community of Yirrkala and the Gove Peninsula. She was considered to be an expert in the inner workings and history of the Yolngu clan systems of Arnhem Land. She also worked to preserve the traditional storytelling of the Yolngu, often comparing the morals and insights of Yolngu traditions with ideas from the Western world. She and another senior member of her clan compiled a book which told the stories Yolngu songlines in Yolngu Matha along with English translations, published in 1989, and helped researchers to produce written knowledge of her culture.

Marika understood the pressures placed on the Yolngu's small language group, called Yolŋu Matha, due to bauxite mining in the area, which commenced during the 20th century. She worked as a linguist to prevent the extinction of her people's indigenous languages. Pertaining to the languages of her own clan, Marika understood all fourteen languages of the Rirratjingu clan, and spoke three of these Rirratjingu languages fluently. She later helped to develop a traditional language curriculum for Yolngu children to preserve local languages.

Marika also focused much of her attention on her native community of Yirrkala. She co-founded the Dhimurru Land Management Aboriginal Corporation, a land management group, in 1992 with her husband, Mununggurritj, and remained the group's cultural adviser for many years.

In 1998 she gave the Wentworth lecture, in which she said: "My other name, my deep name, is Gunutjpitt Gunuwanga. This name links me to my land, to my religious aspect of the land. It defines where I come from, who I am, and with this language, the Rom that the Elders taught over many years and centuries, this is continuing in our community".

== Recognition ==
Charles Darwin University awarded her an honorary doctorate.

Marika was awarded two awards for her work by the National Australia Day Council: the Territorian of the Year award and the Northern Territory's Australian of the Year Award in 2007. She was posthumously appointed a Member of the Order of Australia in the 2009 Australia Day Honours.

== Death and legacy ==
Marika died suddenly in Yirrkala, while hunting with members of her family in the afternoon on Sunday, 11 May 2008. She was believed to have died from a sudden heart attack. She was 49 years old when she died and was survived by her three children, whom she had with her late husband, Mununggurritj.

Barbara Livesey, the CEO of Reconciliation Australia at the time, said that Marika had made massive contributions to Aboriginal affairs across the country: "While we know that she did much work in her community, at the national level she was just a tireless worker for reconciliation and for building understanding between non-Indigenous people, Yolngu people and other Indigenous people". Syd Stirling, the MP for Nhulunbuy in Northern Territory, also paid tribute to Marika saying, "She really was a bridge between the two cultures out here. Dr Marika endeared herself to all of us as a mentor, reconciliation advocate, a passionate and gifted educator, academic, interpreter, translator and a wonderful mother". Jenny Macklin, Minister for Indigenous Affairs, called Marika the "embodiment of reconciliation".

According to Yolngu cultural traditions, Marika can only be referred to by her last name after her death. This is why those paying tribute to Marika did not use her full name.

== Selected works ==
- Marika-Munun̦giritj, Raymattja; Marika, Dhungala; Yirrkala School Literature Production Centre (1991), Ngayi balnana mawurrku : the song of Yirrkala (2nd ed.), Yirrkala Literature Production Centre, ISBN 978-0-86409-200-7
- Bamapama: An Old Manggalili Story. Yirrkala Literature Production Centre. 1998.
- "The Wentworth Lecture 1998". Australian Aboriginal Studies (1): 3–9. 1999.
- Wilkinson, Melanie; Marika, Raymatta; Williams, Nancy M. (2009). "17. 'This place already has a name'". In Hercus, Luise; Koch, Harold (eds.). Aboriginal Placenames: Naming and Re-naming the Australian Landscape. Aboriginal History Monographs. ANU E Press. ISBN 978-1-921666-09-4.

== See also ==
- Banduk Marika (13 October 1954 – 12 July 2021)
- Roy Dadaynga Marika (c.1925– 1993)
- Wandjuk Marika (1927–1987)
