= Djang'kawu =

Yolngu Aboriginal Australian creation myth

The Djang'kawu, also spelt Djanggawul or Djan'kawu, are creation ancestors in the mythology of the Yolngu people of Arnhem Land in the Northern Territory of Australia. It is one of the most important stories in Aboriginal Australian mythology, and concerns the moiety known as Dhuwa.

== Background ==
The Djanggawul/Djang'kawu myth specifically concerned the Dua (Dhuwa) moiety of people, including about a third of the clans that lived in north-east Arnhem Land. The humans born of the two sisters are the ancestors of the Rirratjingu clan. According to Milirrpum Marika (1983): "The base, foundation, culture, our Djang'kawu, the base of the Dhuwa moiety only, of the Dhuwa moiety and its various songs".

== Story ==
The Djang'kawu are three siblings, two female and one male, who created the landscape of Australia and covered it with flora and fauna. They came by canoe from the island of Baralku (Burralku) in the east at night-time, guided by the Morning Star (the planet Venus), landing at Yalangbara. The sisters, Bitjiwurrurru and Madalatj, were the custodians of ceremonial law, and carried with them their digging sticks, feathered headwear and sacred objects hidden in their basket and mats. The objects changed into various landforms along their route, and they created freshwater wells at Yalangbara by plunging their digging sticks into the sand, after which the digging sticks turned into a variety of plant species. Their clap sticks (bilma) turned into rock formations.

At a site known as Balma, high among the sand dunes, the Djang'kawu sisters gave birth to the first of the Rirratjingu clan, and performed the first ngarra ceremony, which is now one of the major ceremonies of the region.

The story includes a meeting with Makassans (Bayini) cooking trepang (dharripa) on the island of Wapilina in Lalawuy Bay. The siblings ask them to leave their land.

The Djang'kawu continue westwards, producing more offspring which gave rise to other clans of the Dhuwa moiety.

== In art ==
A collection of bark paintings by Mawalan Marika entitled Djan'kawu story (1959) is held by the Art Gallery of New South Wales.

=== Major exhibition ===
The Yalangbara: art of the Djang'kawu touring exhibition, instigated by Mawalan Marika's daughter, artist Banduk Marika, and developed with the assistance of other family members and the Museum and Art Gallery of the Northern Territory at Darwin, opened at the National Museum of Australia from 7 December 2010. This was the first major survey exhibition of the Marikas' work, and covers around 50 named sites in the Yalangbara peninsula that were traversed by the Djang'kawu journey. It followed a 2008 monograph of the same name, edited by Margie West and produced in partnership with Banduk Marika and other members of the family. The exhibition featured not only contemporary prints and other items, but also works produced at the Yirrkala mission in the 1930s, bark paintings dating from the 1950s, drawings in crayon commissioned by anthropologist Ronald Berndt, and the Djang'kawu digging stick, borrowed from its usual place alongside the Yirrkala bark petitions in Parliament House in Canberra. The exhibition also travelled to the Museum and Art Gallery of the Northern Territory in Darwin and the Western Australian Museum in Perth in late 2011 and 2012.

A film called In Memory of Mawalan, made in 1971 by Ian Dunlop and released in 1983, was screened along with the exhibition. The background to the film is the Djang'kawu story that laid out the law for the people, which was ignored when the government gave permission for a bauxite mining company to start developing operations in east Arnhem Land. The battle for land rights by the people of Yirrkala mission led to the Yirrkala bark petitions in 1963 and then the Gove Land Rights Case in 1971, which ruled against them. The film is of a special ceremony organised by Wandjuk Marika to honour his father Mawalan Marika, who had been a co-creator and signatory of the Yirrkala bark petitions

== Official recognition of significance ==
The significance of the story was recognised in the assessment of Yalangbara for inclusion in the National Heritage List or Commonwealth Heritage List, submitted in the 2018–2019 assessment list, due for completion by 30 June 2022. As of December 2025 it is not on either list.

== See also ==
- Baijini, a mythical or historical people mentioned in the Djang'kawu songline
- Djanggawul Fossae, a feature on the planet Pluto
- Yirrkala Church Panels, a 1963 artwork which features the story of Djan'kawu
