= Banduk =

1985 Australian TV film

- Written by: James Badger
- Directed by: Di Drew
- Starring: Bayulma Marika; Garry McDonald; Banduk Marika
- Music by: Geoff Harvey
- Country of origin: Australia
- Original language: English

Production
- Producer: Penelope Spence
- Cinematography: Steve Dobson
- Editor: Don Saunders
- Running time: 90 mins
- Production company: Nine Network

Original release
- Release: 1985

Banduk is a 1985 Australian television film shot in Nhulunbuy in East Arnhem Land, Northern Territory of Australia.

== Plot ==
There is no dialogue in the film. The story is instead told in its imagery. The boy and girl siblings in the story (Banduk and Yalumul) realise that the ice-cream van owners are smuggling native animals out of Australia, including one of the Yolngu sacred animals, the red-collared lorikeet, or lindrij. With the help of Banduk's grandfather, they manage to trap the smugglers and are given a reward.

The subplot involves the children raising money to buy musical instruments for their band.

== Cast ==
The cast is as follows:

- Garry McDonald – Mr Kool
- Jone/Joan Winchester – Mrs Kool
- Bayulma Marika – Banduk (Note: Sometimes cited as Banula Marika, but a source for his role in Bedevil (1993) says that was the first film role for Banula (David) Marika.)
- Yalumul Marika – Yalumul
- Roy Marika – Grandad
- Gurumin Marika – Father
- Banduk Marika – Aunt
- Tommy Munyurran – Police aide

== Production ==
Renowned Yolngu artist Banduk Marika served as Aboriginal consultant, and also played the role of Aunt in the film. Roy Marika, Banduk's uncle and renowned artist, plays the grandfather.

== Release ==
The film was made by Channel 9 (now Nine Network) for the Second European Broadcasting Union (EBU) Drama Exchange for children, and released on Channel 9 in July 1985. It was released in the UK by Thames Television.

== Reception ==
Cinema Papers gave the film a mediocre review, but The Sydney Morning Herald (Deirdre McPherson) called it charming in its simplicity, and Bayulma Marika said it was "most appealing as Banduk".
