= Stepping Out (1980 film) =

1980 documentary film

- Directed by: Chris Noonan
- Written by: Chris Noonan
- Produced by: Chris Noonan; Richard Mordaunt; Jane Hanckel
- Starring: Chris Dobbin; Romanyne Grace; Aldo Gennaro
- Cinematography: Dean Semler
- Edited by: Richard Mordaunt
- Music by: Keith Jarrett
- Release date: 1980
- Running time: 50 minutes
- Country: Australia
- Language: English

Stepping Out is a 1980 Australian documentary film created by Chris Noonan, that follows a intellectually disabled theatre group in the leadup to their first public performance at the Sydney Opera House.

== Production ==
Chris Noonan wrote and directed the film.

Stepping Out was largely filmed in 1979 in Gore Hill, Sydney, following residents of the Lorna Hodgkinson Sunshine Home. It features workshops and rehearsals, led by Aldo Gennaro, for a series of performances of the shows The Prince, and Life, Images and Reflections at Sydney Opera House. Dean Semler was responsible for the cinematography.

== Release ==
Stepping Out was released in 1980.

The film screened at the United Nations closing ceremony for the International Year of the Disabled, in 1981.

== Reception ==
John Lapsley of the Sydney Morning Herald gave it 4 stars out of 5. He states "It's not only an important documentary. It is also a riveting, superbly made one which has been quite brilliantly filmed by cinematographer Dean Semmler (sic)." Also in The Sydney Morning Herald, Dave Sargent writes "it is one of the most heartfelt and illuminating films that I have seen for quite some time."

In his Canberra Times review, Dougal McDonald touches on the aftermath, saying "what happened after the film was completed is not so much crazy as nasty. Aldo Gennaro and the matron were dismissed without notice. Chris and Romayne were separated. These were the consequences of the film's attempt to touch on the question of sexuality in the intellectually handicapped. In this, Stepping Out is significantly more forward-looking than another important documentary in the same field". Julian Lewis in the Australian Jewish News wrote "Stepping Out entirely justifies the U.N.'s choice of it as the official film for the 'Year of the Disabled'"

== Awards ==
- 1981 Australian Film Institute Awards
  - Best Documentary - Chris Noonan - won
