= Roy Marika =

Aboriginal Australian artist and Indigenous rights activist (c.1925 – 1993)

Roy Dadaynga Marika MBE (c.1925–1993) was an Aboriginal Australian artist and Indigenous rights activist, who appeared in two films. He was a member of the Marika family, brother of Mawalan 1 Marika, Mathaman Marika, Milirrpum Marika and Dhunggala Marika.

== Early life ==
Dadaynga Marika, known as "Roy", was born around 1925, a member of the Rirratjiŋu clan. Among his brothers were Mawalan I, Mathaman, Milirrpum, and Dhunggala Marika.

== Leadership and activism ==
In 1963, Roy Dadaynga, along with Mawalan, Mathaman, Dhunggala, and Milirrpum, led 13 clans in their bid for establishing land rights for the Yolngu people of the Gove Peninsula, Arnhem Land, Northern Territory, when they created the Yirrkala bark petitions, which were presented to the Australian Parliament in August 1963. In December 1963, Roy Dadaynga organised a farewell bunggul for mission supervisor Edgar Wells and his wife Ann Wells three days after Christmas. The Wellses had supported the people in their bid for land rights, for which Edgar was punished by the Methodist Overseas Mission by ordering him to leave the mission.

Roy Dadaynga assumed the role of leader of the Rirratjiŋu clan from 1970 onwards, and became the president of the Yirrkala Village Council in 1974 when the mission closed. The Marikas were involved in Milirrpum v Nabalco Pty Ltd (named after Roy's older brother Milirrpum, also known as the Gove land rights case). All five were politically active for the rights of the Indigenous Australians, and four of them were well-known Aboriginal artists.

Roy Dadaynga founded Rirratjingu Aboriginal Corporation in 1984.

== In film ==
Roy Dadaynga acted in two films: Werner Herzog's Where the Green Ants Dream (1984), and Banduk (1985).

== Death and legacy ==
Roy Dadaynga died in 1993.

His daughter (with Djerrkngu (Eunice) Marika) was Raymattja Marika and his son is Banula Marika.

== See also ==
- People with the surname Marika
