= Marika Latianara =

Fijian chief and politician

Member of the Senate
- In office 1979–1983

Personal details
- Born: 13 March 1913 Sorokoba, Fiji
- Died: 20 August 1983 (aged 70) Sorokoba, Fiji

Ratu Marika Vukinamualevu Ratoto Latianara (13 March 1913 – 20 August 1983) was a Fijian chief and Senator.

== Biography ==
Latianara was born in Sorokoba on Viti Levu in 1913, the son of Adi Luisa Matai and Ratu Kaliova Vukinamualevu, the Roko Tui of Ba. He became a professional boxer in 1932, initially in the middleweight category, before switching to light heavyweight and then heavyweight, becoming national champion in each classification. He retired undefeated in 1937. He then became a sugarcane farmer and was a member of the Fijian Sugar Council.

In 1959 he was appointed Tui Ba, succeeding his elder brother Filimone, who had died a year earlier, and also became a member of Ba Provincial Council. In 1979 he was appointed to the Senate by the Great Council of Chiefs. He died in Sorokoba in August 1983.
