= Banula Marika =

Aboriginal Australian dancer, actor and performer

- Other name: David Marika
- Occupations: Dancer, musician, actor
- Known for: Work with Bangarra Dance Theatre and Yothu Yindi; Environmental conservation
- Children: Milika
- Father: Roy Marika

Banula (David) Marika is an Aboriginal Australian dancer, actor, singer and performer from Yirrkala in North East Arnhem Land, in the Northern Territory of Australia. The son of Roy Marika, he is a member of the Rirratjingu clan of the Yolngu people, and is known for his performances with the Bangarra Dance Theatre since the 1990s.

He is credited as David Manula Barika for his role as didgeridu player in Jindalee Lady (1992), and as Banula (David) Marika for his first role as an actor in the film Bedevil (1993),

His stage performances with Bangarra include Up Until Now (1991), Praying Mantis Dreaming (1992-3) and Bloodland (2011-2). He also served as cultural consultant on Bangarra's 2020 television production of Ochres.

He has performed as both vocalist and dancer and toured extensively with the band Yothu Yindi, including on their famous song "Treaty". He performed vocals on their third album, Freedom (1993). He also performed with them in a joint project with East Journey, called Genesis, in 2015, which included a performance at the National Indigenous Music Awards 2015.

He has collaborated with founder of the Australian Dance Theatre, choreographer Elizabeth Cameron Dalman, in a work entitled Morning Star (2012–3). Marika is custodian of the Morning Star (Barnumbirr) story, and served as cultural consultant on the work. The Mirramu Dance Company performed Morning Star in March 2013 at the James O. Fairfax Theatre, National Gallery of Australia in Canberra.

As of 2021, Marika is on the board of the Dhimurru Aboriginal Corporation (since at least 2018), along with artist and law man Mawalan 2 Marika, and has also been a Dhimurru Indigenous ranger since 2002. In this role and as a traditional owner, he has contributed to papers on cross-cultural consultancy and environmental conservation measures.

His son, Milika, is also a dancer, primarily in the hip hop style, and has featured in a TV series shown on NITV.
