= Banduk Marika =

Australian artist (1954–2021)

Banduk Marika AO
- Born: Banduk Mamburra Wananamba Marika; 13 October 1954; Yirrkala, Northern Territory, Australia
- Died: 12 July 2021 (aged 66)
- Known for: Art, environmental activism, preservation of culture
- Style: Printmaking, bark painting
- Children: 5
- Father: Mawalan 1 Marika
- Relatives: Wandjuk Marika (brother), Dhuwarrwarr Marika (sister), Yalmay Marika Yunupingu (sister)
- Awards: Red Ochre Award, 2001; Telstra NAATSIA Bark Painting Award, 2005

Banduk Mamburra Wananamba Marika AO (13 October 1954 – 12 July 2021), known after her death as Dr B Marika, was an artist, printmaker and environmental activist from Arnhem Land, Northern Territory, Australia, who was dedicated to the development, recognition and preservation of Indigenous Australian art and culture. She used her artwork to translate her ancestral stories through figures and motifs. She was one of the few Indigenous artists to specialise almost entirely in print making. She was the first Aboriginal person to serve on the National Gallery of Australia's board.

== Early life ==
Marika was born on 13 October 1954 at Yirrkala, north-east Arnhem Land, a member of the Rirratjingu clan of the Yolngu people, whose traditional land is Yalangbara. Yalangbara is located south of Yirrkala in north-east Arnhem Land, and is considered by the Yolngu to be the original place of human creation. Her father, Mawalan Marika (1908–1967), was an artist and he taught her the techniques of bark painting. He was also a ceremonial leader of the Rirratjingu clan. He was known for his talent and expertise in the technique known as rarrk, or cross-hatching. It was highly unusual at the time for Aboriginal women to be involved in bark painting.

Her siblings include brother Wandjuk Marika; and sisters artist Dhuwarrwarr Marika, and teacher-linguist/artist Yalmay Marika Yunupingu (who served at Yirrkala School for 40 years teaching "both ways" bilingual education until her retirement in 2023); also, Bayngul and Laklak.

Marika was educated at the mission at Yirrkala until the age of 15.

Marika's family participated in the Yirrkala Bark Petition, a significant piece of activist art that led to the Australian government to grant ownership rights of aboriginal land to Yolngu people, which had originally been given to Nabalco for mining.

Marika was among a small group to be taught and supported by male relatives (including her father) to paint traditional creation stories, which were formerly only allowed to be done by men.

Artist Ruby Alderton is her daughter. She became one of the youngest and best printmakers to work for the Yirrkala Print Space studio.

== Artistic career ==
She moved first to Darwin in 1972 (or 1974?), where she served as Secretary on the Northern Land Council until 1980. During this time she also worked as an Aboriginal field officer, youth worker at the YWCA, and became mother to four children.

She then moved to Sydney in 1980 to pursue her artistic career. She began printmaking in Sydney, which she preferred over painting for the rest of her career. In Sydney she also arranged exhibitions of Aboriginal art. In 1984, she participated in the Two Worlds Collide exhibition, which involved bringing together artists from many different cultural backgrounds. This exhibition took place at Artspace in Sydney. Later in 1984, she participated in the Koori Art '84 exhibition, which also took place at Artspace. This exhibition was a revolutionary exhibition that introduced many urban-based Indigenous artists.

In the mid-1980s Marika was artist-in-residence first at the Canberra School of Art (1985) and then at Flinders University in Adelaide, South Australia (1986).

In 1988, Marika returned to Yirrkala, to take up the role of manager of Buku-Larrnggay Mulka Arts Centre and Museum, and also became member of the Yirrkala-Dhanbul Community Council. She continued to travel for the purpose of artistic collaborations with other printmakers.

Djanda and the Sacred Waterhole (1988), a work commissioned by the Australian National University to commemorate the Australian Bicentenary, was created using linocut on paper, using six colours. It represented a story of great significance to the Rirratjingu clan, involving part of the complex storyline of the Djang'kawu at Yalangbara. She had special rights to use this story by virtue of her land ownership and position in the clan. The National Gallery of Australia bought one of the prints made by her, while another was purchased for reproduction in a book called Aboriginality. In 1999, she was commissioned to create a bark painting of her homeland for the Saltwater collection, now located at the National Maritime Museum in Sydney.

She was also artist-in-residence at the East Sydney Technical College's school of Art and the Warrnambool TAFE.

Marika incorporated the stories of her clan in her artistic work, such as the Djan'kawu, the Wagilag sisters and the turtle hunters.

Marika, along with the Rirratjingi clan and the Museum and Art Gallery of the Northern Territory (MAGNT), worked together to publish Yalangbara: Art of the Djang'kawu, launched at Government House, Darwin in 2009. The book examines many aspects of Yolngu culture, art, history, tradition, as well as their custodial relationship to land and the issue of copyright. The name derives from the supernatural ancestor siblings, the Djang'kawu, and includes artwork from three generations of Marikas depicting aspects of the story.

The Yalangbara: art of the Djang'kawu touring exhibition, instigated by Marika and developed with the assistance of other family members and MAGNT, opened at the National Museum of Australia from 7 December 2010. This was the first major survey exhibition of the Marika family's work, and covers around 50 named sites in the Yalangbara peninsula that were traversed by the Djang'kawu journey.

In 2017 she and Tiwi Islander Bede Tungutalum were chosen to design a set of four postage stamps with the theme "Art of the North" for Australia Post.

== Exhibitions and collections ==
Her work has been shown in America, India, Egypt, Noumea and Singapore, and is represented in the collections of the National Gallery of Australia; Te Papa in New Zealand; and the National Gallery of Art in Washington D.C. Charles Darwin University holds one of her earliest prints, Makuwa. This was the first print by a Yirrkala artist that the University's art collection acquired. One of her most prominent collections was the Yalaŋbara suite, which she produced in 2000. It was a collection of six linocut prints that depicted several stories relating to the Yolŋu people. In 2016, Trinity College, Melbourne acquired her Yalaŋbara suite of works on paper, and the Burke Gallery at the college mounted an exhibition of her work in early 2021. Five of her prints were shown in the Know My Name exhibition of Australian women artists in 2020-21 at the National Gallery of Australia.

== Other work and roles ==
=== Film ===
She worked as a translator with Film Australia and on the TV series Women of the Sun.

She appeared in several films:

- Banduk (1985), directed by Di Drew;
- Cactus (1986), directed by Paul Cox and starring Isabelle Huppert; and
- Copyrites (1997), a documentary film about Aboriginal copyright (see also below).

She also appeared in Bride for all Seasons! (?) and the docudrama television series Flight into Hell (1985). She features in the ABC Television documentary film, Dream Time, Machine Time (1987) along with poet Oodgeroo Noonuccal, painter Trevor Nickolls and writer Archie Weller.

=== Indigenous intellectual property ===
Banduk said in 1997:

...my brother and I were known to the family as the outcasts because we moved outside of our boundary and went out to an unknown territory that was known as the balanda world, white man's world. And he (Wandjuk) initiated the whole debate about copyright that is still being fought twenty years on.

==== 1993–4 Copyright case ====
In 1993, it was found that Marika's print Djanda and the Sacred Waterhole (1988) had been reproduced without permission on rugs made in Vietnam and marketed by the Perth-based company Indofurn Pty Ltd. Marika joined with the two other artists whose works had been used, George Milpurrurru and Tim Payungka Tjapangarti, to seek reparations under the Copyright Act 1968 and Trade Practices Act. A total of eight artists took action against the company, in a case that became known as the "carpets case" and in 1994 the Federal Court of Australia awarded damages of A$188,000 to the artists and ordered that the rugs be released to them. This was the largest penalty awarded for copyright infringement against Australian artists up to that time, and included compensation for cultural damage stemming from the unauthorised use of sacred imagery. In Marika's work, the case was in regards to the stolen carpet designs being changed to be "less busy," and yet were not substantial enough to circumvent the copyright infringement. However no damages were ever paid to the artists or their next-of-kin, because the company was declared bankrupt and wound up.

A documentary film called Copyrites (1997), examining copyright of Indigenous peoples' creations, featured Marika and fellow Arnhem land artist Gawirrin Gumana.

==== Other work on intellectual property ====
Marika appeared as a witness in 2019 case against Birubi Art for concealing the fact that their "Aboriginal" artefacts for sale were made in Indonesia, and not by Aboriginal artists. The Federal Court ruled against the company.

=== Land and language ===
In 1999 Marika started working towards attaining heritage listing status for the sacred sites at Yalangbara, which is part of her Rirratjingu clan land. The site was listed in 2003 on the Australian Heritage Commission's Register of the National Estate, based largely on her work done with Mawalan 2 Marika and anthropologist Geoffrey Bagshaw.

She gave the 2010 Eric Johnston Lecture on the subject "Land Management and Cultural Responsibility", a recording being held by the Northern Territory Library, and was head of the Mawalan Gamarrwa Nuwul Association, a local landcare organisation.

In 2014, Marika appeared in an SBS/NITV documentary series on Aboriginal Australian languages, called Talking Language, presented by Ernie Dingo.

=== Boards ===
Marika served on the boards of the National Gallery of Australia and the Museums and Art Galleries of the Northern Territory, and ahe was also a member of the Aboriginal and Torres Strait Islander Arts Board of the Australia Council. She was the first Aboriginal person to serve on the NGA's board.

She was a board member of the Indigenous Art Code, a group of artists, curators, and arts and legal organisations working to outlaw fake Indigenous art.

Marika acted as a cultural consultant for the Sydney 2000 Olympic Games.

== Later life and death ==
In 2020, she said in a television interview:

Arts and country and environment are all one... And why are these three elements so important to protect today? It's an identification. It's you knowing who you are, where you've come from, where your ancestors are from. Without those ID, you are nobody. You don't exist.

Marika died on 12 July 2021, aged 66.

After her death, per Yolngu tradition, she is no longer referred to by her full name, but called Dr B Marika.

== Honours and recognition ==
A colour photographic portrait of Marika taken by Anne Zahalka in 1990 is held by the National Portrait Gallery of Australia.

At the 2001 National Indigenous Arts Awards Marika won the Red Ochre Award for her work in the visual arts, the award having been created to recognise "outstanding contribution[s] to the development and recognition of Indigenous arts and culture.

In 2005, she won the bark painting prize at the Telstra National Aboriginal and Torres Strait Islander Art Awards for the painting Yalangbara. She was assisted in painting the work by Boliny and Ralwurrandji Wanambi.

Her book, Yalangbara: Art of the Djang'kawu, was joint winner of the 2009 Chief Minister's Northern Territory Book History Awards.

In April 2018 Marika received an honorary doctorate from Flinders University for "her remarkable contributions as a First Nations artist and cultural advocate for the Yolngu people".

Marika was made an Officer of the Order of Australia (AO) in the 2019 Australia Day Honours for "distinguished service to the visual arts, particularly to Indigenous printmaking and bark painting, and through cultural advisory roles".

In 2020 Marika was featured as one of six Indigenous artists in the ABC TV series This Place: Artist Series. The series is a partnership between the Australian Broadcasting Corporation (ABC) and the National Gallery of Australia (NGA), in which the producers travelled to the countries of "some of Australia's greatest Indigenous artists to share stories about their work, their country, and their communities".

Also in 2020, she was honoured as Senior Territorian of the Year.

== Works ==
- The book Gong-wapitja : Women and art from Yirrkala, northeast Arnhem Land (1998) includes "Story from Banduk".
- West, Margie K. C., ed. (2008), Yalangbara: art of the Djang'kawu, Charles Darwin University Press, ISBN 978-0-9803846-7-3

== See also ==
- People with the surname Marika
