= Djaŋu =

Aboriginal Australian people of Arnhem Land, Northern Territory

The Djaŋu, otherwise written as Djangu and Django, are an Aboriginal Australian people of the area of Arnhem Land in Australia's Northern Territory. Their society is divided into two clans, the Waramiri and Man:atja.

== Name ==
As with the Yolngu categories generally, the determining factor for identifying the Djaŋu as a distinct tribal group is based on the shared use in its various dialects of the defining word for the demonstrative pronoun "this".

== Language ==
The Djaŋu dialect belongs to the Yolŋu language family.

== Country ==
The precise extent of Djaŋu country cannot be measured, given the fluid nature of the concept of tribal land in the area, but generally they live on the eastern coastland of Arnhem Bay, northwards as far as the English Company Islands.

== Social organisation ==
Djaŋu society is organised in two clans, both belonging to the Yirritja moiety:

1. Man:atja (Man(d)atja)
2. Waramiri (Warramiri, Warameri, Warumeri, Warranting, Burada, Buratha, Budalpudal, Buralbural)

== Alternative names ==
- Django

== Sources ==
- Bauer, Anastasia (2014). The Use of Signing Space in a Shared Sign Language of Australia. Walter de Gruyter. ISBN 978-1-614-51547-0.
- Tindale, Norman Barnett (1974). "Djangu (NT)". Aboriginal Tribes of Australia: Their Terrain, Environmental Controls, Distribution, Limits, and Proper Names. Australian National University. ISBN 978-0-708-10741-6. Archived from the original on 20 March 2020.
- Warner, William Lloyd (1937). A Black Civilization: A Social Study of an Australian Tribe. Harper & Brothers.
