= Dhangu-Djangu language =

Australian Aboriginal language

Dhangu
- Djangu
- Native to: Australia
- Region: Northern Territory
- Ethnicity: Dhaŋu, Djaŋu
- Native speakers: 310 (2016 census)
- Language family: Pama–Nyungan: Yolngu Matha; Northern (Dhangu); Dhangu
- Dialects: Wan.gurri; Lamamirri; Rirratjingu; Gaalpu; Ngayimil; Warramiri; Mandatja
- Signed forms: Yolŋu Sign Language

Language codes
- ISO 639-3: dhg
- Glottolog: dhan1270
- AIATSIS: N192 Dhangu, N202 Djangu
- ELP: Dhangu-Djangu

Dhangu (Dhaŋu, Dangu) and Djangu (Djaŋu) constitute an Australian Aboriginal language of the Yolŋu group, spoken by the Dhaŋu and Djaŋu people in Australia's Northern Territory. The varieties of the two moieties of Dhangu are (a) Wan.gurri, Lamamirri and (b) Rirratjingu, Gaalpu, Ngayimil. There are two other Djangu (Djaŋu) dialects, Warramiri and Mandatja; dhangu and djangu are the words for "this" in the various dialects. Nhangu is a closely related language.

== Phonology ==
=== Consonants ===
		Peripheral		Laminal		Apical		Glottal
		Labial	Velar	Dental	Palatal	Alveolar	Retroflex	Glottal
Plosive	Fortis	p	k	t̪	c	t	ʈ	ʔ
Plosive	Lenis	b	g	d̪	ɟ	d	ɖ	ʔ
Nasal		m	ŋ	n̪	ɲ	n	ɳ	
Rhotic						ɾ	(ɽ)	
Lateral						l	ɭ	
Glide		w			j		ɻ	

- /ɖ/ may also be heard as a tap [ɽ] in intervocalic positions.
- The tap /ɾ/ may also be heard as a trill [r].

=== Vowels ===
	Front	Back
High	i iː	u uː
Low	a aː	

- A long vowel /uː/ may also be heard as [oː].
