= Sorokoba =

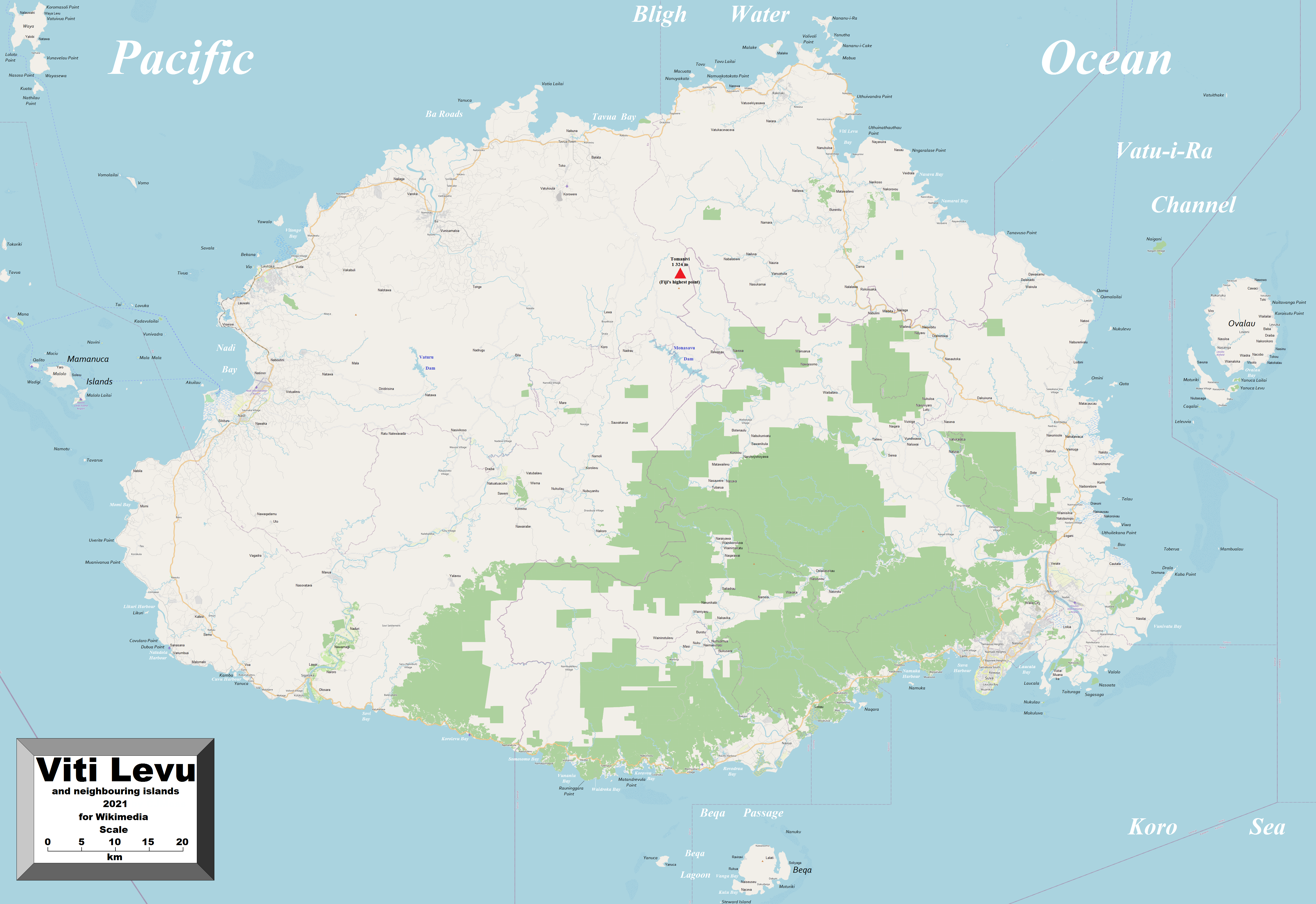
- Viti Levu with Sorokoba in the northwest

- Location in Fiji
- Coordinates: 17°29′25″S 177°42′15″E
- Country: Fiji
- Island: Viti Levu
- Division: Western Division
- Province: Ba
- District: Bulu District
- Time zone: UTC+12

Sorokoba (Fijian pronunciation: [sorokomba]) is a village in Bulu District, Ba Province, Fiji.
