= Moiety (kinship) =

Type of descent group within a society

In the anthropological study of kinship, a moiety (/ˈmɔɪəti/) is a descent group that coexists with only one other descent group within a society. In such cases, the community usually has unilineal descent (either patri- or matrilineal) so that any individual belongs to one of the two moiety groups by birth, and all marriages take place between members of opposite moieties. It is an exogamous clan system with only two clans.

In the case of a patrilineal descent system, one can interpret a moiety system as one in which women are exchanged between the two moieties. Moiety societies operate particularly among the indigenous peoples of North America, Australia (see Australian Aboriginal kinship for details of Aboriginal moieties), and Indonesia.

== Etymology ==
The word moiety comes from Latin medietat-, meaning 'half', through Anglo-Norman or French moitié.
