= Milirrpum v Nabalco Pty Ltd =

First Australian Aboriginal land rights case, heard in the NT Supreme Court in 1971

Milirrpum v Nabalco Pty Ltd.
- Court: Supreme Court (NT)
- Decided: 27 April 1971
- Citation: (1971) 17 FLR 141

Court membership
- Judge sitting: Blackburn J

Milirrpum v Nabalco Pty Ltd, full name Milirrpum and Others v Nabalco Pty Ltd and the Commonwealth of Australia and commonly known as the Gove land rights case because its subject was land known as the Gove Peninsula in the Northern Territory, was the first litigation on native title in Australia, and the first significant legal case for Aboriginal land rights in Australia, decided on 27 April 1971.

The decision of Justice Richard Blackburn ruled against the Yolngu claimants on a number of issues of law and fact, rejecting the doctrine of Aboriginal title. Instead his ruling recognised that in the law of the time of British colonisation of Australia there was a distinction between settled colonies, where the land, being "desert and uncultivated", was claimed by right of occupancy, and conquered or ceded colonies. The decision also noted that the Crown had the power to extinguish native title, if it existed.

The issue of terra nullius was not contemplated in the case. Although Milirrpum was not appealed beyond the Supreme Court of the Northern Territory, it was overruled by the High Court of Australia two decades later in Mabo v Queensland (No 2), when native title was recognised under Australian Law.

== Background ==
The Yolngu people, the traditional owners of Arnhem Land (which includes the Gove Peninsula), had petitioned the Australian House of Representatives in August 1963 with a bark petition after the government had sold part of the Arnhem Land reserve on 13 March of that year to a bauxite mining company, Nabalco without consultation with the traditional owners at the time. However, in 1968 the Commonwealth government granted a special mineral lease to the company over the land for a period of 42 years.

== The case ==
In December 1968, the Yolngu people living in Yirrkala, represented by three plaintiffs, obtained writs in the Supreme Court of the Northern Territory against the Nabalco Corporation, which had secured a 12-year bauxite mining lease from the Federal Government. The writs for the case (officially titled Milirrpum and Others v Nabalco Pty Ltd and the Commonwealth of Australia), were lodged on 13 December 1968. Milirrpum Marika, elder of the Rirratjingu clan, was the named plaintiff in the action; the "Others" were Mungurrawuy Yunupingu, elder of the Gumatj clan, and Daymbalipu, an elder of the Djapu clan, who represented that clan as well as acting on behalf of 11 other peoples with interests in the land. The claim was amended on 6 January 1970, and listed these three as representing their own clans, and the "Marrakuli, Galpu, Munyuku, Ngamil, Wangurri, Djambarrpuyngu, Manggalili, Dhalwangu, Warramirri and Madarrpa clans, who normally reside on the land in the Melville Bay to Port Bradshaw area of the Northern Territory commonly referred to as the Cove(sic) Peninsula". It also specifically referred to the Letters Patent establishing the Province of South Australia in 1836, which recognised the rights of Aboriginal peoples in that colony, now a state, which stated: "that nothing in these our Letters Patent contained shall affect or be construed to affect the rights of any Aboriginal Natives of the said Province to the actual occupation or enjoyment in their own persons or in the persons of their descendants of any lands therein now actually occupied or enjoyed by such Natives".

The plaintiffs' lawyers were Edward Woodward, Frank Purcell, John Little, and John Fogarty. (Note: Misspelt Munffaraway".) The plaintiffs claimed they enjoyed sovereignty over their land, and sought the freedom to occupy their lands, including the right to perform sacred rituals on the land leased to Nabalco. The applicants asserted before the Court that since time immemorial, they held a "communal native title" that had not been validly extinguished, or acquired under the Lands Acquisition Act 1955 (Cth), and should be recognised as an enforceable proprietary right. The lengthy legal battle culminated in 1971.

The court interpreter for the case was Galarrwuy Yunupingu, the son of a Gumatj clan leader, Munggurrawuy, who was one of the Yirrkala plaintiffs. Galarrwuy had earlier helped his father draft the Yirrkala bark petitions. He later became chairman of the Northern Land Council and in 1978 became Australian of the Year for his work on Indigenous rights. Yunupingu went on to successfully win the case Commonwealth v Yunupingu, relating to compensation for government actions in violation of Section 51(xxxi) of the Australian Constitution.

== Judgement ==
=== Ruling on native title claims ===
Justice Blackburn found that the Yolngu people could not prevent mining on their lands. He held that native title was not part of the law of Australia, and even had it existed, any native title rights had been extinguished. Further, even if extinguishment had not occurred, the plaintiffs were not able to prove native title.

Blackburn rejected the claim on the bases that:

- A doctrine of common law native title had no place in a settled colony except under express statutory provisions (i.e. the recognition doctrine).
- Under the recognition doctrine, pre-existing interests were not recognised unless they were rights of private property and, while the community possessed a legal system, it was not proved that under that legal system, the claimant clans possessed such rights.
- The clan’s relationship to land was therefore not a “right ... in connection with the land” under the Lands Acquisition Act 1955.
- On the balance of probabilities, the applicants had not shown that, in 1788, their ancestors had the same links to the same areas of land that they were now claiming.

The terms "settled" and "desert and uncultivated" included territory in which resided "uncivilized inhabitants in a primitive state of society". In such a territory, the laws of England (unless inconsistent with local laws) were imported when sovereignty was acquired. The doctrine of continuity did not relate to settled colonies, and therefore, "if there were no local laws then there were no rights of property to respect". A distinction between settled and conquered colonies was drawn. The decision also noted that the Crown had the power to extinguish native title, if it existed.

Blackburn accepted that the applicants had established that under traditional law any given part of the land could be “attributed” to a particular clan, but held that this did not amount to a proprietary interest. He also found that the evidence did not establish the landholding model asserted. Although the plaintiffs had shown "their long association with the land, and its central place in their law and culture they had not demonstrated exclusive ownership of the land, which therefore belonged to the Crown which had 'settled' it".

=== Comments on existence of Aboriginal law ===
Although Blackburn ruled against the Yolngu people's claim to native title, he rejected argument that they lacked a recognisable system of law. He noted the claimants' ritual and economic use of the land and, for the first time in an Australian superior court, formally recognised the existence of a system of Aboriginal law. He stated:

I am very clearly of the opinion, upon the evidence, that the social rules and customs of the plaintiffs cannot possibly be dismissed as lying on the other side of an unbridgeable gulf. The evidence shows a subtle and elaborate system highly adapted to the country in which the people led their lives, which provided a stable order of society and was remarkably free from the vagaries of personal whim or influence. If ever a system could be called “a government of laws, and not of men”, it is that shown in the evidence before me.

Blackburn also recognised the validity of the use of oral evidence to establish property rights, normally inadmissible, but a vital precondition for a successful land rights case. His judgement concludes: "I cannot help being specially conscious that for the plaintiffs it is a matter in which their personal feelings are involved". Later, in a confidential memorandum to the Government and Opposition, he opined that a system of Aboriginal land rights was "morally right and socially expedient".

== Subsequent developments ==
=== Aboriginal Land Rights Act 1976 ===
There was a deliberate decision to pursue a political course rather than legal challenge to the High Court of Australia, which at the time because of the membership of the Court was likely to reject Blackburn's finding that there was a coherent system of Aboriginal law relating to land. By not having the appeal rejected by the High Court, the findings of Justice Blackburn that were favourable to the plaintiffs (and by extension to other Aboriginal Australian peoples), and thus the concept of land rights, was maintained as a possibility, at least until the membership of the High Court had changed.

Milirrpum led to the establishment of the Woodward Royal Commission by the Whitlam government in 1973–4, and the eventual recognition of Aboriginal Land rights in the Northern Territory. In 1975, shortly before he was dismissed, Prime Minister Gough Whitlam drew up the Aboriginal Land Rights Act 1976 which was later passed (in a slightly diluted form) by the conservative Fraser government on 9 December 1976.

=== Mabo ===
The impact of the international law doctrine of terra nullius on domestic laws, which was not contemplated in this decision, was later addressed in Mabo v Queensland (No 2) (1992), where it was found to not precluded the common law recognition of native title.

=== Gumatj claim (2019–) ===
In 2019, Gumatj leader Galarrwuy Yunupingu, on behalf of the Gumatj clan, instigated a claim in the Federal Court of Australia to recognise native title over the Gove Peninsula as well as seeking compensation of $700 million for the harm caused to their land rights by Commonwealth laws and actions in taking the land, under the Native Title Act 1993 (NTA). The case was heard in 2023, and found in favour of Yunupingu on a number of questions of law, holding that native title rights are equivalent to property rights for the purposes of Section 51(xxxi) of the Australian Constitution. The High Court upheld this decision on 12 March 2025 in Commonwealth v Yunupingu, affirming that any extinguishment of native title does amount to an acquisition, which should me made "on just terms". The case would then go back to the Federal Court to determine what compensation may be due to the people for native title that was extinguished between 1911 and 1978, when the Northern Territory was administered by the Commonwealth Government. Under the NTA, these were invalid acquisitions of property, contravening the "just terms" guarantee in section 51(xxxi).

The decision potentially opens the possibility for other Indigenous groups to seek compensation for past government extinguishments of their native title, but only relating to the Commonwealth Government, not state governments. Compensation had not yet been decided by the end of 2025.

== See also ==
- List of Australian Native Title court cases
- Where the Green Ants Dream
