= Yolŋu =

Aggregation of Indigenous Australian people in northeastern Arnhem Land

Yolŋu Yolngu
Regions with significant populations
- Australia

Languages
- Yolŋu Matha (Dhaŋu-Djaŋu, Nhaŋu, Dhuwal, Ritharŋu, Djinaŋ, Djinba), Australian English, Australian Aboriginal English, Yolngu Sign Language

Religion
- Traditional religions, Christianity

Related ethnic groups
- Australian Aboriginals

The Yolŋu or Yolngu (IPA: [ˈjuːlŋʊ] or [ˈjuːŋuːl]) are an aggregation of Aboriginal Australian people inhabiting north-eastern Arnhem Land in the Northern Territory of Australia. Yolŋu means "person" in the Yolŋu languages. The terms Murngin, Wulamba, Yalnumata, Murrgin and Yulangor were formerly used by some anthropologists for the Yolŋu.

All Yolŋu clans are affiliated with either the Dhuwa (also spelt Dua) or the Yirritja moiety. Prominent Dhuwa clans include the Rirratjiŋu and Gälpu clans of the Dangu people, while the Gumatj clan is the most prominent in the Yirritja moiety.

== Name ==
The ethnonym Murrgin gained currency after its extensive use in a book by the American anthropologist W. Lloyd Warner, whose study of the Yolŋu, A Black Civilization: a Social Study of an Australian Tribe (1937) quickly assumed the status of an ethnographical classic, considered by R. Lauriston Sharp the "first adequately rounded out descriptive picture of an Australian Aboriginal community." Norman Tindale was dismissive of the term, regarding it, like the term Kurnai, as "artificial", having been arbitrarily applied to a large number of peoples of northeastern Australia. The proper transliteration of the word was, in any case, Muraŋin, meaning "shovel-nosed spear folk", an expression appropriate to western peripheral tribes, such as the Rembarrnga of the general area Warner described. (Note: The word, used as an exonym by other tribes, referred to Arnhem Land tribes that had a reputation for aggressive behavior because they had managed to manufacture iron-bladed spears from metal cut from abandoned Caledon Bay water tanks (Tindale 1974, pp. 141–142).)

For Tindale, following recent linguistic studies, the eastern Arnhem Land tribes constituting the Yolŋu lacked the standard tribal structures evidenced elsewhere in Aboriginal Australia, in comprising several distinct socio-linguistic groups in an otherwise integral cultural continuum. He classified these as the Yan-nhaŋu, Djinang, Djinba, Djaŋu, Dangu, Rembarrnga, Ritharngu, Dhuwal and the Dhuwala.

Warner had deployed the term "Murngin" to denote a group of peoples who shared, in his analysis, a distinctive form of kinship organisation, describing their marriage rules, subsection system and kinship terminology. Other researchers in the field quickly contested his early findings. T. Theodor Webb argued that Warner's Murngin actually referred to one moiety, and could only denote a Yiritcha mala, and dismissed Warner's terminology as misleading. A. P. Elkin, comparing the work of Warner and Webb, endorsed the latter's analysis as more congruent with the known facts.

Wilbur Chaseling used the term "Yulengor" in the title of his 1957 work.

Since the 1960s, the term Yolŋu has been widely used by linguists, anthropologists and the Yolŋu people themselves. The term applies to both the sociocultural unit and the language dialects within it.

== People ==
Yolŋu comprise several distinct groups, differentiated by the languages and dialects they speak, but generally sharing overall similarities in the ritual life and hunter-gathering economic and cultural lifestyles in the territory of eastern Arnhem land. Early ethnographers studying the Yolŋu applied the nineteenth-century concepts of tribe, horde and phratry to classify and sort into separate identities the units forming the Yolŋu ethnocultural mosaic. After the work of Ian Keen in particular, such taxonomic terminology is increasingly seen as unsuitable and inadequate because of its eurocentric assumptions. Specialists are undecided, for example, whether the languages spoken by the Yolŋu amount to five or eight, and one survey arrived at eleven distinct "dialect" groups.

== Language ==
Yolŋu speak a dozen languages classified under the general heading of Yolŋu Matha.

== Kinship system ==
Yolŋu groups are connected by a complex kinship system (gurruṯu). This system governs fundamental aspects of Yolŋu life, including responsibilities for ceremony and marriage rules. People are introduced to children in terms of their relation to the child ("grandmother", "uncle", etc.), introducing the child to kinship from the beginning.

Yolŋu societies are generally (Note: There are complications in the schematic models often adopted in ethnography to analyse kinship. The reader may consult two papers by Ian Keen for details (Keen 1995, pp. 502–527; Keen 2000, pp. 419–436).) described in terms of a division of two exogamous patrimoieties: Dhuwa and Yirritja. Each of these is represented by people of a number of different groups, each of which have their own lands, languages, totems and philosophies.

Moiety	Clan groups
Yirritja	Gumatj, Gupapuyŋu, Waŋurri, Ritharrngu, Maŋalili, Munyuku, Maḏarrpa, Warramiri, Dhalwaŋu, Liyalanmirri, Mäḻarra, Gamalaŋa, Gorryindi.
Dhuwa	Rirratjiŋu and Gälpu (both of the Dangu sub-group); Golumala, Marrakulu, Marraŋu, Djapu, Ḏatiwuy, Ŋaymil, Djarrwark, Djambarrpuyŋu.

A Yirritja person must always marry a Dhuwa person (and vice versa). Children take their father's moiety, meaning that if a man or woman is Dhuwa, their mother will be Yirritja (and vice versa).

Kinship relations are also mapped onto the lands owned by the Yolŋu through their hereditary estates – so almost everything is either Yirritja or Dhuwa – every fish, stone, river, etc., belongs to one or the other moiety. For example, Yirritja yiḏaki (didgeridoos) are shorter and higher-pitched than Dhuwa yiḏaki. A few items are wakinŋu (without moiety).

The term yothu-yindi (after which the band takes its name) literally means child-big (one), and describes the special relationship between a person and their mother's moiety (the opposite to their own). Because of yothu-yindi, Yirritja have a special interest in and duty towards Dhuwa (and vice versa). For example, a Gumatj man may craft the varieties of yiḏaki associated with his own (Yirritja) clan group and the varieties associated with his mother's (Dhuwa) clan group.

The word for "selfish" or "self-centred" in the Yolŋu languages is gurrutumiriw, literally "kin lacking" or "acting as if one has no kin".

The moiety-based kinship of the Yolŋu does not map in a straightforward way to the notion of the nuclear family, which makes accurate standardised reporting of households and relationships difficult, for example in the census. Polygamy is a normal part of Yolŋu life: one man was known to have 29 wives, a record exceeded only by polygamous arrangements among the Tiwi.

=== Avoidance relationships ===
As with nearly all Aboriginal groups, avoidance relationships exist in Yolŋu culture between certain relations. The two main avoidance relationships are:

son-in-law – mother-in-law
brother – sister

Brother–sister avoidance, called mirriri, normally begins after initiation. In avoidance relationships, people do not speak directly or look at one another, and try to avoid being in too close proximity with each other.

=== Prominent family names ===
- Gurruwiwi – Gälpu clan (Dhuwa moiety, Dangu people)
- Marika – Rirratjingu clan (Dhuwa moiety, Dangu people)
- Yunupingu – Gumatj clan (Yirritja moiety)

== Yolŋu culture, law and mythology ==
=== Law ===
The word for "law" in Yolŋu is rom, and there are particular ceremonies associated with Rom, known as Rom ceremony. The complete system of Yolŋu customary law is known as Ngarra, or as the Maḏayin (also written madayan and Mardiyhin).

Maḏayin embodies the rights of the owners of the law, or citizens (rom watangu walal) who have the rights and responsibilities for this embodiment of law. Maḏayin includes all the people's law (rom); the instruments and objects that encode and symbolise the law (Maḏayin girri); oral dictates; names and song cycles; and the holy, restricted places (dhuyu ṉuŋgat wäŋa) that are used in the maintenance, education and development of law. Galarrwuy Yunupingu has described Rom watangu as the overarching law of the land, which is "lasting and alive... my backbone". This law covers the ownership of land and waters, the resources on or within these lands and waters. It regulates and controls production and trade and the moral, social and religious law, including laws for the conservation and the farming of plants and aquatic life.

Yolŋu believe that living out their life according to Maḏayin is right and civilised. The Maḏayin creates a state of Magaya, which is a state of peace, freedom from hostilities and true justice for all.

The story of Barnumbirr (Morning Star), depicting the first death in the Dreamtime, is the beginning of Maḏayin, the cycle of life and death.

A document listing various Yolŋu laws, authorised by both Dhuwa and Yirritja political leaders and described as "brief and incomplete in both depth and scope", was published "for guests attending the Narra' at Galiwin'ku" on 3 September 2005. (Note: 'These words of instruction are for discipline and teaching. They proceed from the man (the deep-seated political and spiritual authority) of the Djirrikay and Dalkarra (the Dhuwa political leaders and the Yirritja political leaders), and from the hJarra' (the Parliamentary and Judicial sacred chamber of law).')

=== Gaṉma ===
A Deakin University study published in 2000 investigated Aboriginal knowledge systems in reaction to what the authors regarded as Western ethnocentrism in science studies. The author argues that Yolŋu culture is a system of knowledge different in many ways from that of Western culture, and may be broadly described as viewing the world as a related whole rather than as a collection of objects. The relationship between Yolŋu and Western knowledge is explored by using the Yolŋu idea of gaṉma (Yerin in the Guringai language), which metaphorically describes two streams, one coming from the land (Yolŋu knowledge) and one from the sea (Western knowledge) engulfing each other so that "the forces of the streams combine and lead to deeper understanding and truth".

=== Sacred objects ===
Raŋga is a name for sacred objects or emblems used in ceremony.

=== Mythology ===
==== Wangarr ====
The concept of Wangarr (also spelt Wanja or Waŋa) is complex. Attempts to translate the term into English have called the Wangarr beings variously "spirit man/woman", "ancestor", "totem", or various combinations. The Yolŋu believe that the Wangarr ancestor-beings not only hunted, gathered food and held ceremonies as the Yolŋu do today, but also that they created plants and geographical features such as rivers, rocks, sandhills and islands, and these features now incorporate the essence of the Wangarr. They also named species of plant and animal, and made these sacred to the local clan; some Wangarr took on the characteristics of a species, which then became the totem of the clan. Sacred objects and certain designs are also associated with certain Wangarr, who also gave that clan their language, law, paintings, songs, dances, ceremonies and creation stories.

In 2022 Rirratjŋu lore man Banula Marika advised choreographer Gary Lang and his NT Dance Company on a new work called Waŋa, performed in collaboration with MIKU Performing Arts and Darwin Symphony Orchestra, which shows the story of a spirit's journey after death.

== Yolŋu seasons ==
Yolŋu identify six distinct seasons: Miḏawarr, Dharratharramirri, Rärranhdharr, Bärra'mirri, Dhuluḏur, Mayaltha and Guṉmul.

== History ==
=== Makassan contact ===
Yolŋu engaged in extensive trade annually with Makassan fishermen at least two centuries before contact with Europeans. They made yearly visits to harvest trepang and pearls, paying Yolŋu in kind with goods such as knives, metal, canoes, tobacco and pipes. In 1906, the South Australian Government did not renew the Makassans' permit to harvest trepang, and the disruption caused economic losses for the regional Yolŋu economy.

Yolŋu oral histories and the Djanggawul myths preserve accounts of a Baijini people, who are said to have preceded the Makassan. These Baijini have been variously interpreted by modern researchers as a different group of (presumably, Southeast Asian) visitors to Australia who may have visited Arnhem Land before the Makassans, as a mythological reflection of the experiences of some Yolŋu people who have travelled to Sulawesi with the Macassans and came back, or perhaps as traders from China.

Yolŋu also had well-established trade routes within Australia, extending to Central Australian clans and other Aboriginal countries. They did not manufacture boomerangs themselves but obtained these via trade from Central Australia. This contact was maintained through use of message sticks, as well as mailmen – with some men walking several hundred kilometres in their work to send messages and relay orders between tribes.

=== European contact ===
Yolŋu had known about Europeans before the arrival of British in Australia through their contact with Macassan traders, which probably began around the sixteenth century. Their word for European, Balanda, is derived from the Makassar language via the Malay "orang belanda" (Dutch person).

=== Nineteenth century ===
In 1883, the explorer David Lindsay was the first colonial white to penetrate Yolŋu lands for the purposes of making a survey of its resources and prospects. He trekked along the Goyder River to reach the Arafura Swamp on the western fringe of Wagilak land. In 1884, 10,000 square miles (26,000 km^{2}) of Arnhem Land was sold by the colonial British government to cattle grazier, John Arthur Macartney. The property was called Florida Station and Macartney stocked it with cattle overlanded from Queensland. The first manager of the property, Jim Randell, bolted a swivel cannon to the verandah of the homestead to keep the Indigenous people away, while Jack Watson, the last manager of the property, reportedly "wiped out a lot" of "the blacks" living on the coast at Blue Mud Bay. During the period of Watson's management, another large massacre is recorded to have happened at Mirki on the north coast of Florida Station. The Yolŋu people today remember this massacre where many people including children were shot dead. The battles between the graziers and the local population resulted in a severe depopulation of Yolŋu, but the stiffness of resistance temporarily ended efforts by the intruding balanda to take over further territory, and efforts at settlement ground to a halt. Monsoonal flooding, disease and the strong resistance from the local Aboriginal population resulted in Florida Station being abandoned by Macartney in 1893.

=== Twentieth century ===
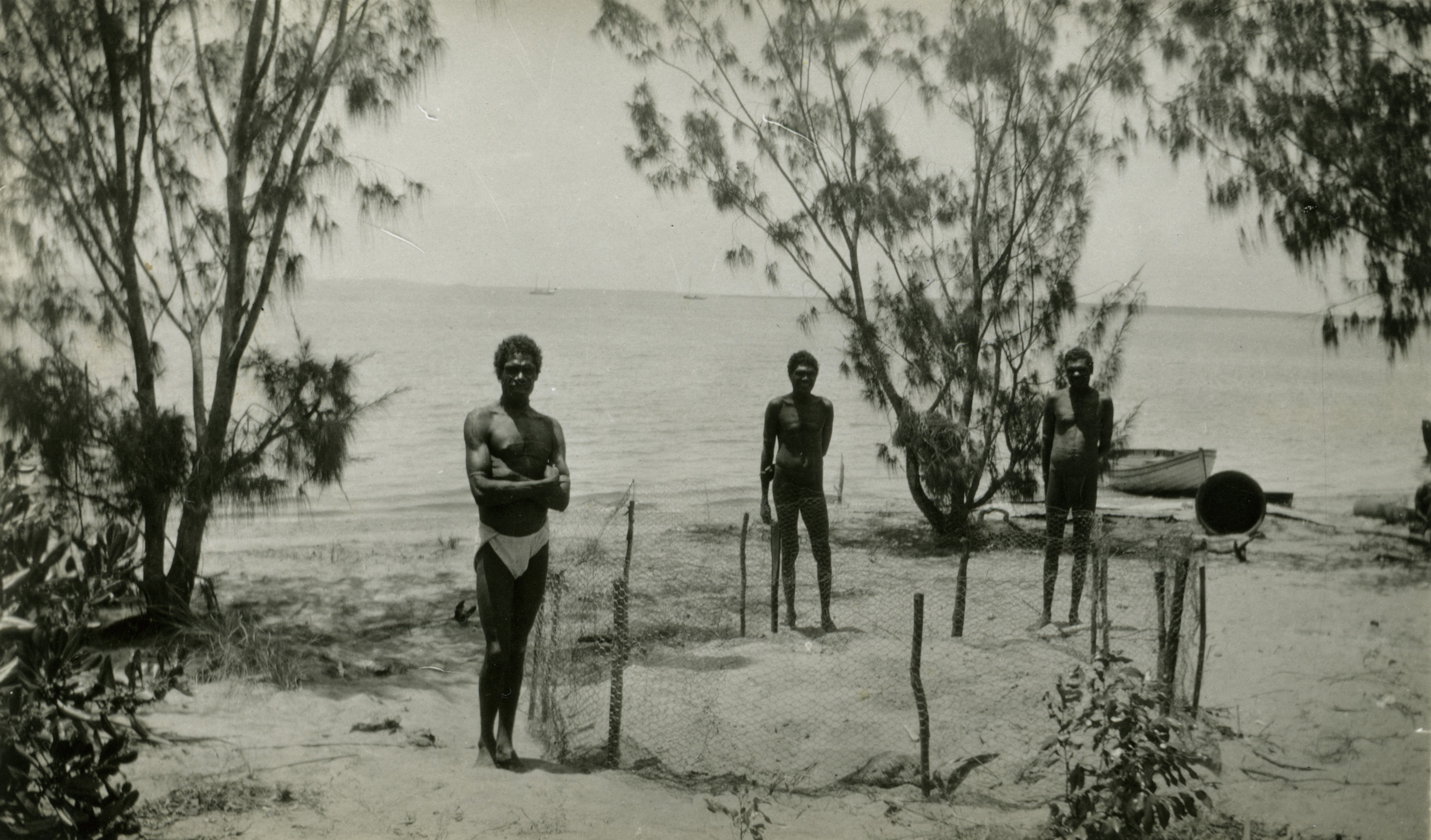
Graves of the Japanese trepangers killed in the Caledon Bay crisis

In the early 20th century, Yolŋu oral history relates, punitive expeditions were launched into their territories. From 1903 to 1908, the property rights of much of Arnhem Land were held by the Eastern and African Cold Storage Supply Company. This Anglo-Australian consortium leased the region under the name of Arafura cattle station and attempted to construct a massive cattle raising and meat production industry. The company employed roving gangs of armed men to shoot the resident Aboriginal population. The first mission to Yolŋu country was set up at Milingimbi Island in 1922. The island is the traditional home of the Yan-nhaŋu. Beginning in 1932, over two years, three incidents of killing outsiders caused problems for the Yolŋu.

In 1932 five Japanese trepangers were speared by Yolŋu men, in what became known as the Caledon Bay crisis. Yolŋu men testified that their actions arose in response to the abuse of their women and to thrashings and firing on them by the Japanese crew. Two whites, Fagan and Traynor, were killed near Woodah Island the following year, and soon afterwards, in July, Constable McColl, who was investigating the incidents, was speared on that island. (Note: 'Police, delayed by the wet season, pursued the men at Blue Mud Bay, where Constable Stewart McColl was speared in July. The police were later accused of handcuffing four women who were left under McColl's watch with two Aboriginal trackers while their party went after the suspects. McColl is believed to have released all but one woman, Japarri, who called out for help (just before her death she told Ted Egan intercourse did not take place). McColl then fired on her husband Dagiar, who speared him' (Conor 2013, p. 61).) The Aboriginal evidence was ignored in the trials which led to their conviction and the imprisonment of five Yolŋu in Fannie Bay Gaol in present-day Darwin. Only the intervention of missionaries, who had a foothold on the fringes of this area, and of the anthropologist Donald Thomson, who led a groundswell of indignation at the travesty of justice, averted an official reprisal designed to "teach the wild blacks a lesson." One sentence was quashed, three sons of a local leader were released as was Dagiar, who had received a death sentence. It was widely believed that the latter, who disappeared, had been lynched by local policemen.

Thomson lived with the Yolŋu for several years (1935–1937) and made some photographic and written records of their way of life at that time. These have become important historical documents for both Yolŋu and European Australians.

In 1935 a Methodist mission opened at Yirrkala.

In 1941, during World War II, Thomson persuaded the Australian Army to establish a Special Reconnaissance Unit (NTSRU) of Yolŋu men to help repel Japanese raids on Australia's northern coastline (classified as top secret at the time). Yolŋu made contact with Australian and US servicemen, although Thomson was keen to prevent this. Thomson relates how the soldiers would often try to obtain Yolŋu spears as mementos. These spears were vital to Yolŋu livelihood, and took several days to make and forge.

More recently, Yolŋu have seen the imposition of large mines on their tribal lands at Nhulunbuy.

== Yolŋu in politics ==
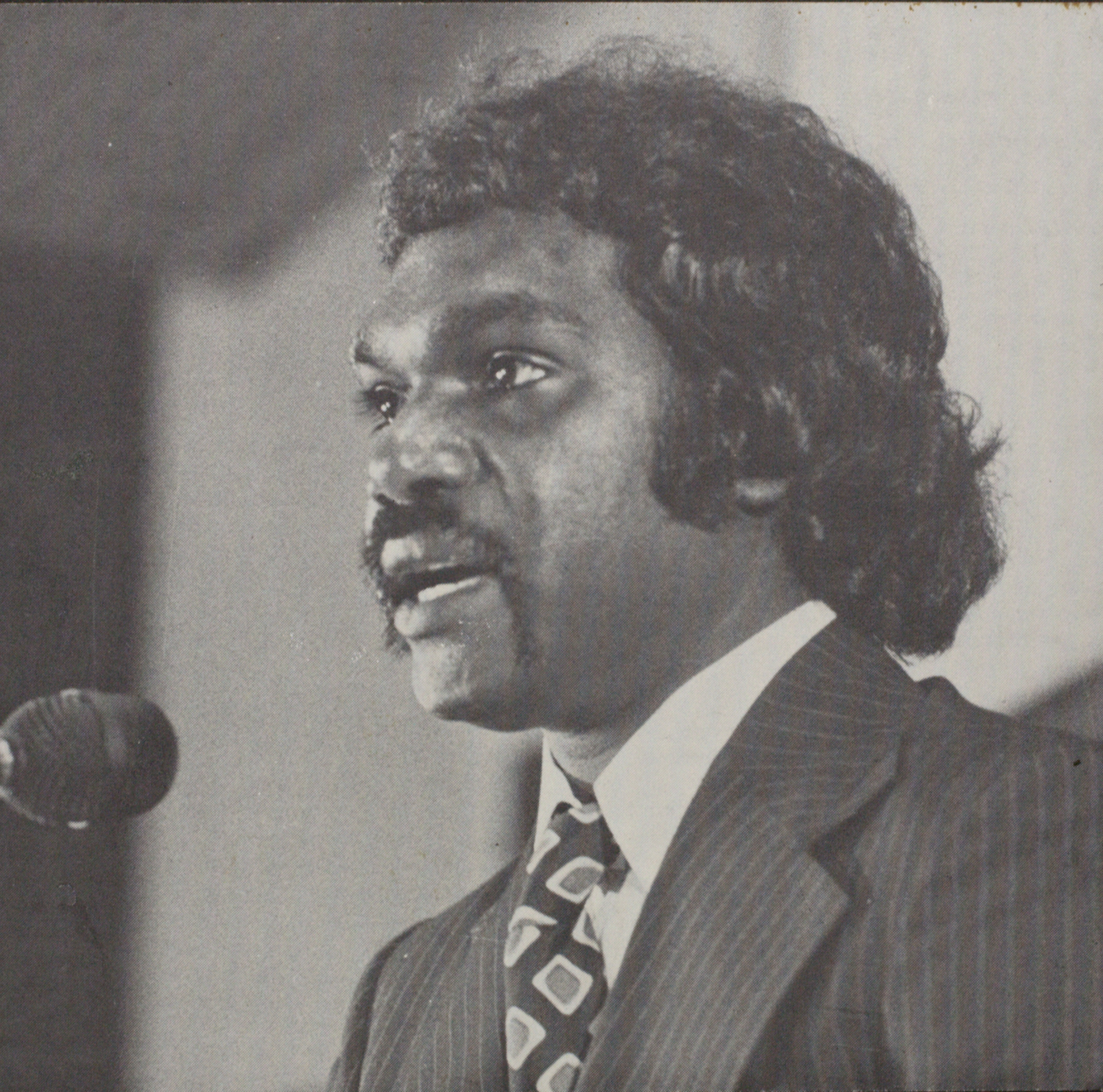
Galarrwuy Yunupingu in 1977

Since the 1960s Yolŋu leaders have been conspicuous in the struggle for Aboriginal land rights.

In 1963, provoked by a unilateral government decision to excise a part of their land for a bauxite mine, Yolŋu at Yirrkala sent to the Australian House of Representatives two petitions mounted on decorated bark, known as the Yirrkala bark petitions. The bark petitions attracted national and international attention and are displayed Parliament House, Canberra as a testament to the Yolŋu role in the birth of the land rights movement.

When the politicians demonstrated they would not change their minds, the Yolŋu of Yirrkala took their grievances to the courts in 1968, in the case of Milirrpum v Nabalco Pty Ltd, or the Gove land rights case, heard in 1971. Yolŋu lost the case because Australian law did not allow for the recognition of any prior rights to land to Indigenous people at the time of colonisation. However, the judge did acknowledge the claimants' ritual and economic use of the land and that they had an established system of law, paving the way for future Aboriginal land rights in Australia. It was said to have played a vital part in paving the way to the recognition of Aboriginal land rights in the Aboriginal Land Rights Act 1976 and the Mabo decision in 1992.

The song "Treaty", by Yothu Yindi, which became an international hit in 1989, arose as a remonstration over the tardiness of the Hawke government in enacting promises to deal with Aboriginal land rights, and made a powerful pleas for respect for Yolŋu culture, territory and Law.

In 2019, Galarrwuy Yunupingu, an elder of the Gumatj clan, brought a native title claim on behalf of his clan to the Full Court of the Federal Court of Australia. He also sought compensation of $700 million for the harm caused to their land rights by Commonwealth laws and actions in taking the land, under the Native Title Act 1993. After the Federal Court ruled in favour of the Gumatj, the government appealed the decision to the High Court. In Commonwealth v Yunupingu the High Court which ruled in favour of the Gumatj claimants in March 2025, although a ruling on compensation was left to another court.

== Yolŋu arts ==
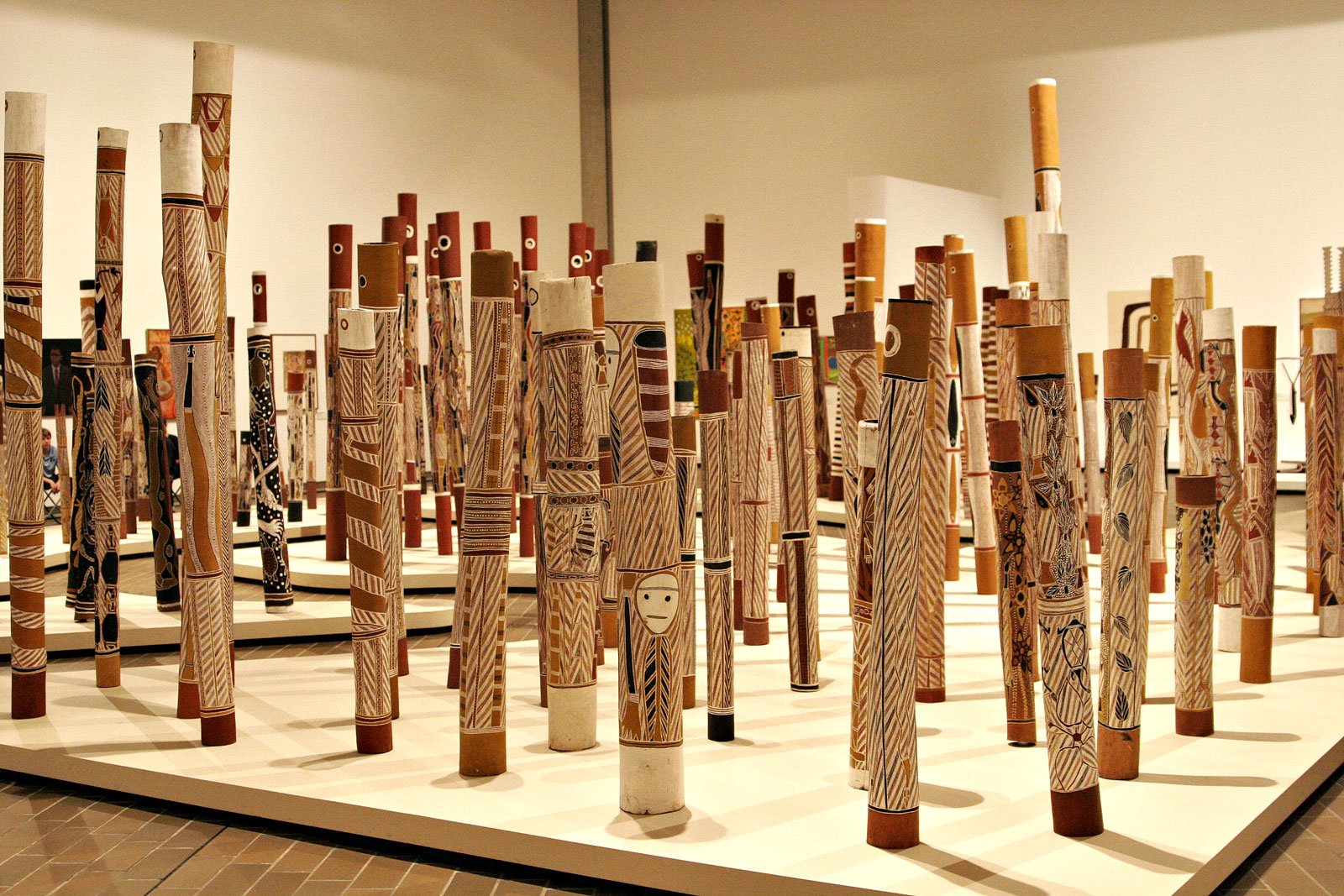
Yolŋu use hollow logs in traditional burial rituals. They are also an important "canvas" for their art, Aboriginal Memorial, NGA

Yolŋu artists and performers have been at the forefront of global recognition of Aboriginal and Torres Strait Islander culture. Yolŋu traditional dancers and musicians have performed widely throughout the world and retain a germinal influence, through the patronage of the Munyarryun and Marika families in particular, on contemporary performance troupes such as Bangarra Dance Theatre.

=== Yolŋu visual art ===
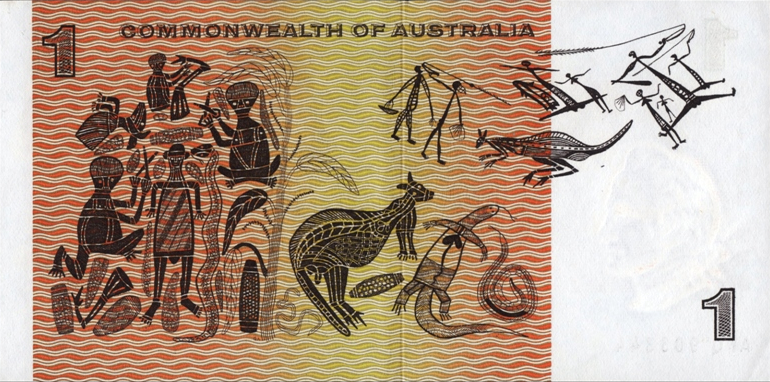
The $1 note featuring David Malangi's art

Before the emergence of the Western Desert art movement, the most well-known Aboriginal art was the Yolŋu style of fine cross-hatching paintings on bark. The hollow logs (larrakitj) used in Arnhem Land burial practices serve an important spiritual purpose and are also important canvases for Yolŋu art. David Malangi Daymirringu's bark depiction of Manharrnju clan mourning rites of the clan, from a private collection, was copied and featured on the original Australian one-dollar note. When the copyright violation came to light the Australian government, through the direct agency of H. C. Coombs, hastened to remunerate the artist.

Yolŋu are also weavers. They weave dyed pandanus leaves into baskets. Necklaces are also made from beads made of seeds, fish vertebrae or shells. Colours are often important in determining where artwork comes from and which clan or family group created it. Some designs are the insignia of particular families and clans.

=== Yolŋu music ===
The Yothu Yindi band, especially after its song "Treaty", performed the most popular indigenous music since Jimmy Little's Royal Telephone (1963). The band became Australia's most successful contemporary indigenous music group, and performed throughout the world. Their work has elicited serious musicological analysis.

Arnhem Land is the home of the yiḏaki, which Europeans have named the didgeridoo. Yolŋu are both players and craftsmen of the yiḏaki. It can only be played by certain men, and traditionally there are strict protocols around its use.

Geoffrey Gurrumul Yunupingu (1971–2017) was a famous Yolŋu singer.

== Prominent Yolŋu people ==
- Baker Boy (Danzal Baker)
- Balang Tom E. Lewis
- Galuma Maymuru
- George Rrurrambu Burarrwanga
- Gary Dhurrkay
- Gatjil Djerrkura
- Nathan Djerrkura
- David Gulpilil
- Dhakiyarr Wirrpanda
- Dhukal Wirrpanda
- Djalu Gurruwiwi
- Leila Gurruwiwi
- Laurie Baymarrwangga
- Rarriwuy Hick
- David Malangi
- Djambawa Marawili
- Banduk Marika
- Raymattja Marika
- Roy Marika
- Wandjuk Marika
- Janet Munyarryun
- Ray Raiwala
- Galarrwuy Yunupingu
- Geoffrey Gurrumul Yunupingu
- Mandawuy Yunupingu

=== Politicians ===
- Yingiya Mark Guyula, independent member for Nhulunbuy in the Northern Territory Legislative Assembly.

== Films about Yolŋu ==
- Ten Canoes
- Westwind: Djalu’s Legacy, about Djalu Gurruwiwi (there are also other films about him)
- Yolngu Boy
- High Ground
- In My Father's Country (2008)
- Dhakiyarr vs The King (film) (2004)
- The Skin of Others (2020) starring the late Murrungun man Balang Tom E. Lewis in his final performance as Douglas Grant

== Garma festival ==
Every year, Yolŋu come together to celebrate their culture at the Garma Festival of Traditional Cultures. Non-Yolŋu are welcome to attend the festival and learn about Yolŋu traditions and Law. The Yothu Yindi Foundation oversees this festival.

== Alternative names ==
- Murngin
- Wulamba
- Yalnumata

Sources: Keen 2005, p. 80 AIATSIS: N230;

== See also ==
- Gove land rights case
- Indigenous Australian food groups
- Yirrkala bark petitions
- Taboo against naming the dead
- Australian Aboriginal astronomy

== Sources ==
- Battler (13 March 1926). "On the track". The Morning Bulletin. No. 19, 211. Queensland, Australia. p. 3 – via National Library of Australia.
- Bauer, Anastasia (2014a). "Chapter 3: Cultural and sociolinguistic context" (PDF). The use of signing space in a shared sign language of Australia. Walter De Gruyter. p. 38. ISBN 978-1-61451-547-0.
- Bauer, Anastasia (2014b). The Use of Signing Space in a Shared Sign Language of Australia. Walter de Gruyter. ISBN 978-1-614-51547-0.
- Berndt, Ronald M. (2005) [First published 1952]. Djanggawul: An Aboriginal Religious Cult of North-Eastern Arnhem Land. Routledge. ISBN 978-041533022-0.
- Butchers, Bethany (13 March 2025). Cooper-Douglas, Erin (ed.). "The High Court made a landmark decision on native title law. Here's what it means". The Conversation. Archived from the original on 24 November 2025.
- Caruana, Wally (4 August 2014). "Art and object". AIATSIS.
- Chaseling, Wilbur (1957). Yulengor: nomads of Arnhem Land. A.P. Elkin. Epworth Press – via Trove.
- Christie, Michael (2007). "Ecological community and species attributes in Yolnghu religious symbolism". In Leitner, Gerhard; Malcolm, Ian G. (eds.). The Habitat of Australia's Aboriginal Languages: Past, Present and Future. Walter de Gruyter. pp. 57–78. ISBN 978-3-110-19079-3.
- Conor, Liz (2013). "'Black Velvet' and 'Purple Indignation': Print responses to Japanese 'poaching' of Aboriginal women". Aboriginal History. 37: 51–76. doi:10.22459/AH.37.2013.03. JSTOR 24046958.
- Corn, Aaron David Samuel (2009). Reflections & Voices: Exploring the Music of Yothu Yindi with Mandawuy Yunupingu. Sydney University Press. ISBN 978-1-920-89934-9.
- "Dhuwa and Yirritja Yiḏaki". YidakiStory.com.
- Elkin, A. P. (June 1933). "Marriage and Descent in East Arnhem Land". Oceania. 3 (4): 412–416. doi:10.1002/j.1834-4461.1933.tb01676.x. JSTOR 40327431.
- Evans, Brett (21 February 2016). "How Aboriginal artist Dave Malangi's design ended up on Australia's money". The Sydney Morning Herald.
- Gaunt, C. E. (6 July 1934). "The Lepers of Arnhem Land and Sketches". Northern Standard. No. 52. Northern Territory, Australia. p. 4 – via National Library of Australia.
- Gaymarani, George Pascoe (2011). "An introduction to the Ngarra law of Arnhem Land". Northern Territory Law Journal. 1: 283–304. Archived from the original on 17 June 2022.
- "High Court determines Commonwealth's liability to native title compensation". Human Rights Law Centre . 6 August 2025. Archived from the original on 10 December 2025.
- Hughes, Ian (November 2000). "Ganma: Indigenous Knowledge for Reconciliation and Community Action". Action Research e-Reports. Archived from the original on 2 September 2006.
- James, Felicity (5 August 2022). "Gary Lang's Waŋa dance collaboration explores ancient and modern beliefs about death". Australia: ABC News.
- Keen, Ian (December 1982). "How Some Murngin Men Marry Ten Wives: The Marital Implications of Matrilateral Cross-Cousin Structures". Man. New Series. 17 (4): 620–642. doi:10.2307/2802037. JSTOR 2802037.
- Keen, Ian (August 1995). "Metaphor and the Metalanguage: "Groups" in Northeast Arnhem Land". American Ethnologist. 22 (3): 502–527. doi:10.1525/ae.1995.22.3.02a00030. JSTOR 645969.
- Keen, Ian (September 2000). "A Bundle of Sticks: The Debate over Yolngu Clans". The Journal of the Royal Anthropological Institute. 6 (3): 419–436. doi:10.1111/1467-9655.00024. JSTOR 2661083.
- Keen, Ian (2005) [First published 1990]. "Ecological community and species attributes in Yolnghu religious symbolism". In Willis, Roy (ed.). Signifying Animals: Human Meaning in the Natural World. Routledge. pp. 80–96. ISBN 978-0-203-26481-2.
- Kelly, Danial (2014). "Foundational sources and purposes of authority in Madayin" (PDF). Victoria University Law and Justice Journal. 4 (1): 33–45. doi:10.15209/vulj.v4i1.40.
- Lewis, Robert (2007). "Dust Echoes: Chapter 4: Morning Star: A Study Guide" (PDF). ABC Education. From Screen Education magazine. Australian Broadcasting Corporation and ATOM.
- Macartney, J. A. (1909). "Rockhampton fifty years ago: reminiscences of a pioneer; Reminiscences of the early days in Rockhampton and elsewhere". Rex Nan Kivell Collection – via Trove.
- McIntosh, Ian S. (2008). "Missing the Revolution! Negotiating disclosure on the pre-Macassans (Bayini) in North-East Arnhem Land". In Thomas, Martin; Neale, Margo (eds.). Exploring the Legacy of the 1948 Arnhem Land Expedition. Australian National University. pp. ?. ISBN 978-192166644-5.
- "Melourr Gapu Dhularrpa Gawiya" (PDF). Parliament of Australia. September 2005. Archived from the original (PDF) on 11 August 2007.
- Morphy, Frances (2008a). "Whose governance, for whose good? the Laynhapuy Homelands Associationand the neo-assimilationist turn in Indigenous policy". In Hunt, Janet; Smith, Diane; Garling, Stephanie; Sanders, Will (eds.). Contested Governance: Culture, power and institutions in Indigenous Australia. Vol. 29. Australian National University Press. pp. 113–151. ISBN 978-1-876-94488-9. JSTOR j.ctt24hcb3.13.
- Morphy, Frances (2008b). Invisible to the state: kinship and the Yolngu moral order. Negotiating the Sacred V: Governing the Family. Monash University. pp. 1–13 – via ResearchGate.
- Mortimer, Lorraine (1 October 2019). Roger Sandall's Films and Contemporary Anthropology. Indiana University Press. p. 76. ISBN 978-025304395-5.
- "N230: Yolngu Matha". AIATSIS. 26 July 2019.
- Needham, Joseph; Wang, Ling; Lu, Gwei-djen (1971). Physics and Physical Technology: Civil Engineering and Nautics. Science and Civilisation in China. Vol. 4. Cambridge University Press. ISBN 0-521-07060-0.
- "About Yolngu". Nhulunbuy Corporation. Archived from the original on 20 February 2020.
- Pelly, Michael (4 February 2024). "A fight over a bauxite mine may launch a new era for land rights". Australian Financial Review.
- Read, Peter (2002). "Reconciliation, trauma and the native born" (PDF). Humanities Research. 9 (1): 29–35.
- Roberts, Tony (2005). Frontier justice: a history of the Gulf country to 1900. University of Queensland Press. ISBN 978-0-702-24083-6.
- Rothwell, Nicholas (8 May 2008). "Evolution in Sacred Tradition". Annandale Galleries.
- Ryan, Lyndall (2019). "Colonial Frontier Massacres in Australia, 1788-1930: Mirki massacre". University of Newcastle, Centre for 21st Century Humanities.
- Sharp, R. Lauriston (1939). "Review: W. Lloyd Warner, a Black Civilization: a Social Study of an Australian Tribe". American Anthropologist. 41 (1): 150–152. doi:10.1525/aa.1939.41.1.02a00250.
- Stubington, Jill; Dunbar-Hall, Peter (October 1994). "Yothu Yindi's 'Treaty': Ganma in Music". Popular Music. 13 (3): 243–259. doi:10.1017/s0261143000007182. JSTOR 852915. S2CID 153678918.
- Swain, Tony (1993). A place for strangers: towards a history of Australian Aboriginal being. Cambridge University Press. ISBN 978-0-521-44691-4.
- Thomson, Donald (1992). Mulvaney, John (ed.). "Coastal Patrol and the Special Reconnaissance Unit 1941-43" (PDF). Aboriginal History. 16 (1): 1–57.
- Thomson, Donald; Peterson, Nicholas (2005). Donald Thomson in Arnhem Land. Miegunyah Press. ISBN 978-0-522-85205-9.
- Tindale, Norman Barnett (1974). Aboriginal Tribes of Australia: Their Terrain, Environmental Controls, Distribution, Limits, and Proper Names. Australian National University Press. ISBN 978-0-708-10741-6.
- Verghis, Sharon (7 June 2014). "Bangarra Dance Theatre: history in movement". The Australian.
- Walker, Alan & Zorc, R. David (1981). "Austronesian Loanwords in Yolngu-Matha of Northeast Arnhem Land". Aboriginal History. 5: 109–134.
- Warner, William Lloyd (April 1930). "Morphology and Functions of the Australian Murngin Type of Kinship". American Anthropologist. 32 (2): 207–256. doi:10.1525/aa.1930.32.2.02a00010. JSTOR 661305.
- Warner, William Lloyd (April–June 1931). "Morphology and Functions of the Australian Murngin Type of Kinship (Part II)". American Anthropologist. 33 (2): 172–198. doi:10.1525/aa.1931.33.2.02a00030. JSTOR 660835.
- "Wayawu to Dhuruputjpi, (2010) by Galuma Maymuru (8 August 1951- )". Art Gallery of New South Wales.
- Webb, T. Theodor (June 1933). "Tribal Organization in Eastern Arnhem Land". Oceania. 3 (4): 406–411. doi:10.1002/j.1834-4461.1933.tb01675.x. JSTOR 40327430.
- White, Neville (2016). "A history of Donydji outstation, north-east Arnhem Land" (PDF). In Peterson, Nicolas; Myers, Fred (eds.). Experiments in self-determination: Histories of the outstation movement in Australia. Australian National University Press. pp. 323–346. ISBN 978-1-925-02289-6.
- Williams, Nancy M. (1986). The Yolngu and Their Land: A System of Land Tenure and the Fight for Its Recognition. Stanford University Press. ISBN 978-0-804-71306-1.
- Wright, Clare (2024). Näku Dhäruk: The Bark Petitions: How the People of Yirrkala Changed the course of Australian democracy. Text Publishing Company. ISBN 978-1-922-33086-4.
- "Yirrkala bark petitions 1963 (Cth)". Documenting A Democracy. Museum of Australian Democracy.
- "Yolngu Culture". Dhimurru Aboriginal Corporation.
- "Yothu-Yindi and Yiḏaki Crafting". YidakiStory.com.
- Yunupingu, Galarrwuy (July 2016). "Rom Watangu: An Indigenous leader reflects on a lifetime following the law of the land". The Monthly.
