= Dangu people =

Aboriginal Australian people of Arnhem Land, Northern Territory, Australia

The Dangu (Dhaŋu, Dhangu) are an Aboriginal Australian people of Arnhem Land, in the Northern Territory, one of many Yolŋu peoples. They are, according to Norman Tindale, to be carefully distinguished from the Djaŋu. (Note: "The similarities in terminology alone would have been sufficient to confuse anyone not alerted to the difference between, for example, the interdental d of Dangu and Djangu." (Tindale 1974, p. 141))

Two prominent clans of the Dangu are the Rirratjingu and Galpu clans.

== Country ==
The extent of Dangu territory could not be established by Tindale, who located them in the general area of Yirrkala Mission, Cape Arnhem, Melville Bay, and Port Bradshaw.

== Social organisation ==
Like all Yolŋu societies, the Dangu, identified as a grouping of clans sharing similar dialects, were organised according to the Dhuwa and Yirritja (Jiritja) moieties. Their ethnonymic identity as a unified group was based on their common word for the demonstrative pronoun "this". They are divided into six clans according to which moiety they belong to, of four Dua, and two Yirritja.

The Dua moiety:

- Galpu (Gälpu, Galbu, Kalpu)
- Golumala
- Ngajimil (Ngayimil, Ngeimil, Makkanaimulmi)
- Riratjingu (Rirratjingu, Rirraljinga, Riraidjango, Wurrulul, Woralul, Urorlurl)

The Yirritja moiety:

- Lamami (Lamumiri)
- Wanguri (Wangurri, Wonguri, Wan:guri)

== Mythology ==
In the Gälpu clan legends, Wititj, the huge ancestral rainbow serpent, was said to create thunder and lightning as it moved across the land, but is also associated with the calm freshwater systems where the spirits reside, among water lilies and palm trees.

== Alternative names ==
- Yirgala (a toponym)

== Notable people ==
- Djalu Gurruwiwi, highly respected elder, maker and player of the yiḏaki, of the Galpu clan, and other members of the Gurruwiwi family
- Many members of the Marika family, of the Rirratjingu clan

== Sources ==
- Daley, Paul (8 September 2014). "The old man and the sea (and Gotye): the story of 'Australia's only guru'". The Guardian.
- Tindale, Norman Barnett (1974). "Dangu (NT)". Aboriginal Tribes of Australia: Their Terrain, Environmental Controls, Distribution, Limits, and Proper Names. Australian National University Press. ISBN 978-0-708-10741-6. Archived from the original on 20 March 2020.
- Warner, William Lloyd (1937). A Black Civilization: A Social Study of an Australian Tribe. Harper & Brothers.
