= Wonggu Mununggurr =

Australian Aboriginal artist

- Born: c.1880 Caledon Bay, Northern Territory, Australia
- Died: June 7, 1959; Yirrkala, Northern Territory, Australia
- Children: Djiriny Mununggurr, Djutadjuta Mununggurr, Maw Mununggurr, Mutijipuy Mununggurr, Wirilma Mununggurr, Dhunggala Mununggurr, Waka Mununggurr, Djayala Mununggurr, Daymbalipu Mununggurr
- Family: Djapu clan

Wonggu Mununggurr (c.1880–1959) was an Aboriginal Australian artist and leader of the Djapu clan of the Yolngu people of northeast Arnhem Land in the Northern Territory of Australia.

== Biography ==
Wonggu Mununggurr was born during 1880 in Northeast Arnhem land. Specifically, he was born in Caledon Bay to the Djapu clan and Dhuwa Moeity. The Djapu are also a part of a large group of aboriginal people known as Yolngu in the North-East Arnhem Land region. Three of his sons were arrested in 1934 for an assault on three Japanese trepangers. Around the same time, in 1934, Wonggu willingly donated a piece of land for a church to be built and for future missionary work. Eventually after extensive lobbying, Wonggu's sons were released in 1936. This led to Wonggu Mununggurr moving his family during the years of 1937-38 from Caledon Bay to the Yirrkala. From here he also helped Donald Thompson with guides and scouts for the area. Upon first meeting Wonggu, Thomson described him as appearing over fifty, and yet still looking to be in the prime of his life. Specifically, Thomson notes Wonggu as being "a tall, powerful man with intelligent face, deep set eyes and a heavy beard, trimmed almost in Van Dyck style.” At Yirrkala, intergroup differences fueled tensions and fighting occurred. Regardless, Wonggu helped to establish Yirrkala for the long term.

Wonggu was an elder in the Djapu clan. While having this high status, he is one of the Yolngu leaders in the Caldeon Bay area. This status stated that Wonggu could have many wives. Wonggu had more than twenty wives and at least sixty children. In addition, he also brought many distant families for Wonggu. In these types of clans back in this time, most of the children take the same talents as the ancestors. It comes to no surprise that Wonggu's sons have also became well-known artists in this area alongside their dad. Wonggu would sit down with them and teach them how he does his specific style and adds their clan designs into them also.

Donald Thompson created an irregular warfare unit in 1941 during World War II called Northern Territory Special Reconnaissance Unit (NTSRU). NTSRU was mainly made up of aboriginal people from the Northern Territory of Arnhem Land, Australia, with 50 Yolngu people, such as Wonggu and many of his sons, prepared to fend off impending Japanese invasion. Sadly, the Unit received no pay nor recognition until 1992, when only two former members remained alive.

Mununggurr met with Donald Thompson at Caledon Bay to set up peace between the nation and government. The friendship was sparked after Mununggurr's children were arrested and gave Thompson a "Måk" (message stick) to give to their father. Soon after, Wonggu gave a Måk to Thompson as a message for the government, stating that the Yolngu people would stop killing outsiders if they were no longer being harassed. The design on this stick showed Wonggu sitting peacefully in his mother's country. The impact of this act was incredibly significant: the serial massacres of Indigenous Australians finally ended after nearly 150 years. He also gave Thompson some bark paintings as a show of respect. In 1935, Mununggurr started painted his sacred miny'tl at Yirrkala. The confusing part about his paintings is that Mununggurr painted the clan designs of Yirritja rather than his own clan designs which were Dhuwa. This friendship between Thompson and Wonggu was established and Thomson took it upon himself to rectify current maps and assign names to unnamed landmarks upon meeting the several influential people on his journey, such as Wonggu. Among the names he bestowed, many were in tribute to patrons and family members. In homage to his dear friend Wonggu, he named a creek "Wongo Creek".

In 1936 Wilbur Chaseling along with the support from the Northern Territory Administration (NTA) had surveyed Arnhem Land's coast and chose Yirrkala as the site for a new mission. This was a Methodist Overseas Mission (MOM) whose goal was to spread Christianity as well as help support the Yirrkala community. As the mission gained ground it sought funding from artwork made by local people, Wonggu Mununggurr included.

In 1947 Wonggu Mununggurr alongside many other leaders of the Yirrkala community did a series of paintings. These paintings were originally done in natural pigments on bark amounting to over 200 pieces. Anthropologists Catherine and Ronald Berndt commissioned those works for research and record of indigenous art. Soon thereafter these 200 works were produced the Berndt's recommissioned the art to be done on mediums of crayon and paper so that it could be transported without fear of destruction. Now many of Wonggu Mununggurr's crayon works are held in the Berndt Museum of Anthropology of the University of Western Australia, Perth.

After Thomson’s death, his ashes were scattered across Caledon Bay in 1970. Two of Wonggu’s sons - Djiriny and Maw - rode on the airplane while the ashes were scattered. Even after Wonggu and Thomson had both passed, the connection Wonggu’s family shared with Thomson held strong.

== Caledon Bay crisis ==
The Caledon Bay crisis became well known after the multiple killings that happened in the Northern territory of Caledon Bay in 1932–1934. This series of events went from just a few murders to multiple people going missing after trying to investigate the original murders. In conclusion to the Caldeon Bay Crisis, Donald Thompson was sent to the Northern Territory of Arnhem Land to investigate and hopefully deescalate the situation and stop the spread of similar causes throughout Australia. Because of this, Thompson was instructed to form the NTSRU unit as a defence systems from the Japanese raids. From here, there was a strong connection between the Australian Aborigines and European governments, which in turn, sparked a friendly economic systems through commission for their bark art.

In response to the whole crisis, Wonggu decided to move him family away from Caldeon Bay to Yirrkala.

== Collections ==
- Art Gallery of New South Wales
- Berndt Museum of Anthropology, University of Western Australia
- The Donald Thompson Collection on loan to Museums Victoria from the University of Melbourne

== Significant exhibitions ==
- Ancestral power and the aesthetic: Arnhem Land paintings and objects from the Donald Thomson Collection. Ian Potter Museum of Art, University of Melbourne. 2 Jun 2009–23 Aug 2009.
- Maḏayin: Eight Decades of Aboriginal Australian Bark Painting from Yirrkala. The Fralin Museum of Art, University of Virginia. February 2, 2024 - July 14, 2024.

== Works ==
- Wonggu Mununggurr (with sons, Maama, Mawunpuy and Natjiyalma), "Djapu clan, Dhuwa moiety Djapu minytji (Djapu clan design)," 1942 natural pigments on eucalyptus bark 189.4 x 105.2 cm. Wonggu and his sons created this significant artwork referencing the totemic ancestors of the Djapu clan, focusing on their connection to the land near Caledon Bay and their role in ceremonial practices. The painting features a distinctive motif known as Djapu minytji, representing wet season clouds, depicted stacked on the horizon to symbolize the arrival of monsoonal rains. Donald Thomson's field notes highlight the unique form of the minytji associated with these clouds, contrasting with the diamond motif used by Yirritja clans.
- Djapu clan, Dhuwa moiety Sacred and " 'just drawing' minytji (designs)," 1935 natural pigments on eucalyptus bark 60.6 x 143.9 cm. This significant artwork marks a pivotal moment in both global art history and the intercultural dynamics of Australia. Munuŋgurr made representations of Yirritja designs, traditionally associated with his ceremonial role, within the shared territory of the Maŋgalili and Munyuku clans. He was allowed to paint these patterns because of his mother's lineage.
- Djapu clan, Dhuwa moiety " Marawat (brush/'hair of the head'), " 1935 human hair bound on wood with fibre 7.7 x 0.4 x 0.4 cm.
- Wonggu Mununggurr, "Fish trap at Wandawuy," 1947, lumber crayon on butchers’ paper. Wonggu Mununggurr, collaborated with the Berndts during their visit to Yirrkala in 1946–47, aiming to document the intricacies of Yolngu culture and law. This collaboration, while surprising to some, aligns with Wonggu's history of engaging with outsiders, characterized by a spirit of cooperation and sharing knowledge. Among the artists who worked with the Berndts, Wonggu stands out as the most prolific, contributing 84 out of the 365 drawings in the Yirrkala crayon collection, providing insights into the broader context of cultural exchange during that time.
- Wonggu Mununggurr, "Macassan Prau," 1935–45, natural pigments on bark, 1005 x 825mm. Indigenous art often portrays the Macassan prau and trepang, activities in which many Aboriginal individuals participated, indicating their historical engagement in maritime endeavors. Despite the trade prohibition in 1906, the enduring influence of the Macassan culture persists in Indigenous Australia, celebrated through ceremonies, language, ancestral lineage, and bark paintings.
- Wonggu Mununggurr, "Djambuwal (Thunderman) story," 1942, natural pigments on bark, 1052 x 1894mm.
