= Strehlow =

Strehlow is a German surname. Notable people with this surname include:

- August W. Strehlow (1867–1943), German-American politician in Wisconsin
- Bertha Strehlow (1911–1984), Australian educator, wife of Ted
- Carl Strehlow (1871–1922), German missionary in Central Australia
- Frieda Strehlow (1875–1967), German missionary, wife of Carl
- John Strehlow (born 1946), Australian stage director and writer, son of Ted and Bertha
- Theodor George Henry (Ted) Strehlow (1908–1978), Australian anthropologist, son of Carl and Frieda
- Wendy Strehlow (born c. 1958), Australian actress

== See also ==
- Strehlow Research Centre, Alice Springs, Australia, named after Ted
- Strehlow Terrace, North Omaha, Nebraska
- Strelow (disambiguation)
