= Johann Erhard Fischer =

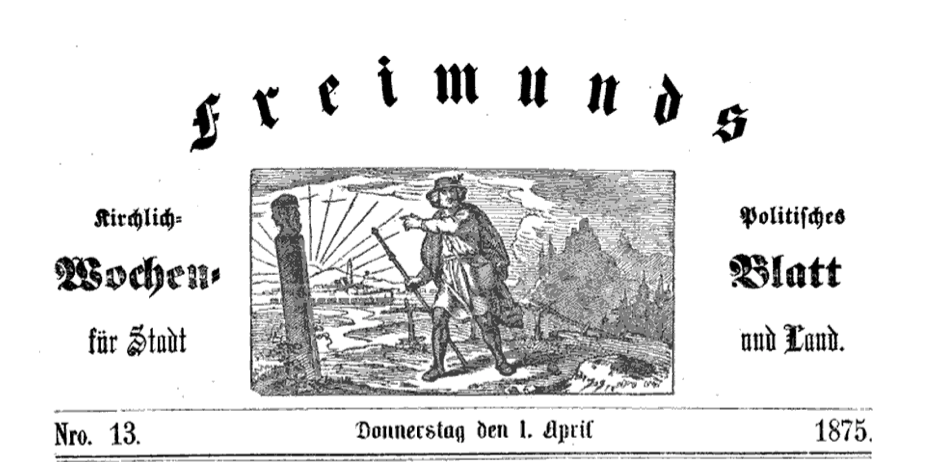
- Fischer was Editor of Freimunds Kirchlich- Politisches Wochenblatt from 1874 – 1884.
- Born: 24 January 1817; Hof, Upper Franconia, Bavaria
- Died: 5 December 1884 (aged 67); Theilenhofen, Bavaria
- Education: University of Erlangen
- Spouse: Sophia Elisa Marianna Omeis (1827 - 1888)
- Children: Marianne Caroline Christianne Friederike (Keyßer) Fischer (1848 - 1889), Justine Marie Mathilde Fischer (1852 - 1869), Paul Christian Ferdinand Fischer (1856 - 1874), and Auguste Christiane Antonie (Heckel) Fischer (1862 - 1913).
- Religion: Lutheran
- Ordained: 1844
- Congregations served: Artelshofen (1844 - 1866) and Theilenhofen (1866 - 1884)

Reverend Johann Erhard Fischer (24 January 1817 in Hof, Bavaria – 5 December 1884 in Theilenhofen, Bavaria) was a Lutheran pastor, who was a church historian, author, and editor, as well as a Neo-Lutheran activist and co-founder with Wilhelm Löhe of the Society of Inner Mission (der Gesellschaft für innere Mission) based in Neuendettelsau.

== Early life and education ==
Johann Erhard Fischer was born in Hof to the shoemaker Georg Christian Fischer (1791 – 1872) and his wife Friederica Traugotte née Matthäus (1784 - 1834). He attended the Gymnasium in his hometown Hof until 1836.

He was then accepted at the University of Erlangen where he attended from 1836 to 1840. As a student pastor he preached in Sachsgrün under the direction of Pastor Johann Schott. Also during his time at the university he was closely acquainted with professor Karl von Raumer who was a mentor to both him and Wilhelm Löhe.

In September 1840 Fischer passed his Theology Examen with the score of "very close to very good" (German: sehr nahe an sehr gut). That same month he was assigned as a Pastoral Candidate in Schwarzenbach an der Saale under the direction of Pastor Johann Georg Renzel where he remained for a little over 3 years before he was finally ordained a pastor.

== Career ==
On 10 Dec 1843 Fischer was supposed to begin as the pastor at Artleshofen however, due to unforeseen circumstances, it wasn't until 4 Feb 1844 that he was officially installed as Artelshofen's pastor. A year later he married Sophia Elisa Marianna Omeis (1827 - 1888), daughter of Rev. Johann Paul Omeis (1796 - 1870) and Marianna Regina née Rupprecht (1797 - 1891). They married on 20 May 1845 in Henfenfeld where her father was the pastor. While a pastor in Artelshofen he and his wife had four children: Marianne Caroline Christianne Friederike (Keyßer) Fischer (1848 - 1889), Justine Marie Mathilde Fischer (1852 - 1869), Paul Christian Ferdinand Fischer (1856 - 1874) and Auguste Christiane Antonie (Heckel) Fischer (1862 - 1913).

In 1850, Fischer was a founding member, along with the co-founders Wilhelm Löhe and Friedrich Wucherer of the Society of Inner (and later: Outer) Mission. Under the direction of Löhe, the Society later became an influential force in American Lutheranism helping to found the Missouri and Iowa Synods along with numerous orphanages and educational institutions such as Wartburg College.

During the 1840s and 1850s Reverend Fischer was a great helper of Löhe's ecclesial and missionary works and was called Löhe's brother-in-arms (Waffenbruder). He is also mentioned fondly by Frau Oberin Therese Stählin who was the head of Löhe's Deaconess House.

On 23 Sep 1851 the Kulmbach Conference presented a view of the Lutheran church's relationship with the Kingdom of Bavaria that advocated for a government controlled Oberconsistorium to lead all churches in Bavaria regardless of their confession of faith. Borrowing from the position of the freechurch in Breslau (Breslauer Freikirche, later known as the Lutheran Church in Prussia (lutherische Kirche in Preußen)), this view was challenged by Rev. Fischer and Wilhelm Löhe in favor of a church free from government oversight. Claiming that this new oversight created a denomination that was neither Lutheran, Reformed, or Rationalist but simply Protestant, Fischer and Löhe insisted that under this law, there was no longer a Lutheran church in Bavaria and that the Bavarian law must be challenged. Fischer and Löhe were both signatories of a response consisting of six sentences that was signed in Schwabach on 9 Oct 1851 and published as Erklärung mehrerer Geistlichen über ihr Verhältniß zur bayerisch-protestantischen Landeskirche. Eine Erwiederung der Culmbacher-Konferenz vom 23. September 1851.

The signers in addition to Fischer were as follows:

- Fr. Bauer, Cand. th. und Vorstand der Missionsanstalt in Nürnberg.
- Fischer, Pfarrer in Aufseß.
- Wilhelm Löhe, Pfarrer zu Neuendettelsau.
- G. J. Rödel, Pfarrer zu Mengersdorf.
- N. Semm, Pfarrer zu Fürth.
- Volk, Pfarrer zu Rügland.
- Wucherer, Pfarrer von Baldingen.

In 1866 Fischer became the pastor at Theilenhofen. While at Theilenhofen, he became the general editor for Freimunds kirchlich-politisches Wochenblatt für Stadt und Land (from 1874 - 1884). Freimunds was a weekly newsletter founded by Reverend Johann Friedrich Wucherer. Wucherer was a long time friend and was also co-founder of the Society of Inner and Outer Mission (German: Gesellschaft für Innere und Äußere Mission im Sinne der Evangelisch-Lutherischen Kirche).

Fischer's focus on the early church missionary efforts that had evangelize the Germanic tribes of his ancestors is attributed as a major influence on his grandson, the well-known linguist, explorer, and missionary Christian Gottlob Keyser who stayed with his Fischer grandparents in Theilenhofen when his father died in 1879. Keyser is well known for using some of these same missionary techniques advocated by his grandfather in evangelizing tribes in Papua New Guinea.

Also coming to live with him part-time in his later days was his granddaughter Frieda (Keyser) Strehlow who also became a missionary to Australia and helped lower infant mortality and preserve aboriginal history and culture there.

On 5 December 1884 Reverend Johann Erhard Fischer died in Theilenhofen and was buried in Theilenhofen on December 8.

== Publications ==
Fischer also became a published historian. While a pastor at Artelshofen, Rev. Fischer wrote his three major historical works. The first work which he published in 1853 was a study of the missionary strategies of evangelization of the early Germanic tribes found in Swabia, Bavaria and Franconia. This work was entitled: Die Kraft des Evangeliums: mittheilungen aus der alteren Missionsgeschichte von Schwaben, Bayern und Franken.

The next year (1854) Fischer published a local history related to his parish in Artelshofen and Altfalter which was a collection of cemetery records and old documents entitled: Die Kirchhöfe zu Artelshofen und Altfalter: geschichtliche Nachrichten nebst einer Einweihungsrede aus dem Jahre 1754, zunächst den beiden Gemeinden zur Erinnerung mitgetheilt; zum Besten bedrängter und verfolgter Lutheraner (1854).

Lastly, Fischer wrote a history of how Christianity was introduced into what was then the Kingdom of Bavaria. This book was published in 1863 as Die Einführung des Christenthums im jetzigen Königreiche Bayern : ein geschichtlicher Versuch zunächst für Missionsfreunde.

Besides these published books he also acquired and contributed historical artifacts to the German Museum and articles to historical organizations. One such article he wrote concerns the altar painting in the church in Artelshofen painted in 1518. He also published two articles: Notizen zur Geschichte der Pfarreiein Artelshofen und Alfalter and Der Sturm auf Enzendorf 1504, for the Middle Franconia Historical Society in 1853.

Rev. Fischer was asked to be the main speaker at the Missionsfest in Münchberg on 27 Jul 1859. His sermon was taken from Isaiah 9:2-7. His sermon was well received and subsequently published in a collection of popular sermons entitled Casual-Reden: eine Sammlung kirchlicher Reden für besondere Amtsfälle.

=== List of Works ===
Books:

- Die Kraft des Evangeliums: mittheilungen aus der alteren Missionsgeschichte von Schwaben, Bayern und Franken (1853).
- Die Kirchhöfe zu Artelshofen und Altfalter: geschichtliche Nachrichten nebst einer Einweihungsrede aus dem Jahre 1754, zunächst den beiden Gemeinden zur Erinnerung mitgetheilt; zum Besten bedrängter und verfolgter Lutheraner (1854).
- Die Einführung des Christenthums im jetzigen Königreiche Bayern : ein geschichtlicher Versuch zunächst für Missionsfreunde (1863).

Published Sermon:

- Missions-Predigt Isaiah (Jesaja) 9:2-7. Preached at the Missionsfest in Münchberg (27 Jul 1859) and published in Casual-Reden: eine Sammlung kirchlicher Reden für besondere Amtsfälle (1871).

Articles (partial):

- Erklärung mehrerer Geistlichen über ihr Verhältniß zur bayerisch-protestantischen Landeskirche. Eine Erwiederung der Culmbacher-Konferenz vom 23. September 1851 (1851) - signer/co-author
- Notizen zur Geschichte der Pfarreiein Artelshofen und Alfalter (1853).
- Der Sturm auf Enzendorf 1504 (1853).

As general editor:

- Freimunds kirchle-politische Wochenblatt für Stadt und Land (1874 – 1884).

== Relationships ==
Rev. Fischer is the grandfather of the chemist, linguist, and missionary to New Guinea Christian Gottlob Keyßer (1877 – 1961), who is considered the most important Neuendettelsau missionary of his generation.

He is the grandfather of the Australian missionary and humanitarian Frieda (Keyser) Strehlow who lived part-time with the Fischer's in Theilenhofen when her father died in 1879. She along with her husband Carl Strehlow contributed to the Strehlow Research Centre in Australia in the preservation of aboriginal history and culture. Fischer was the great-grandfather of the author and anthropologist Professor Ted Strehlow.
