= Varuna, The Writers' House =

Australia's national residential writers house

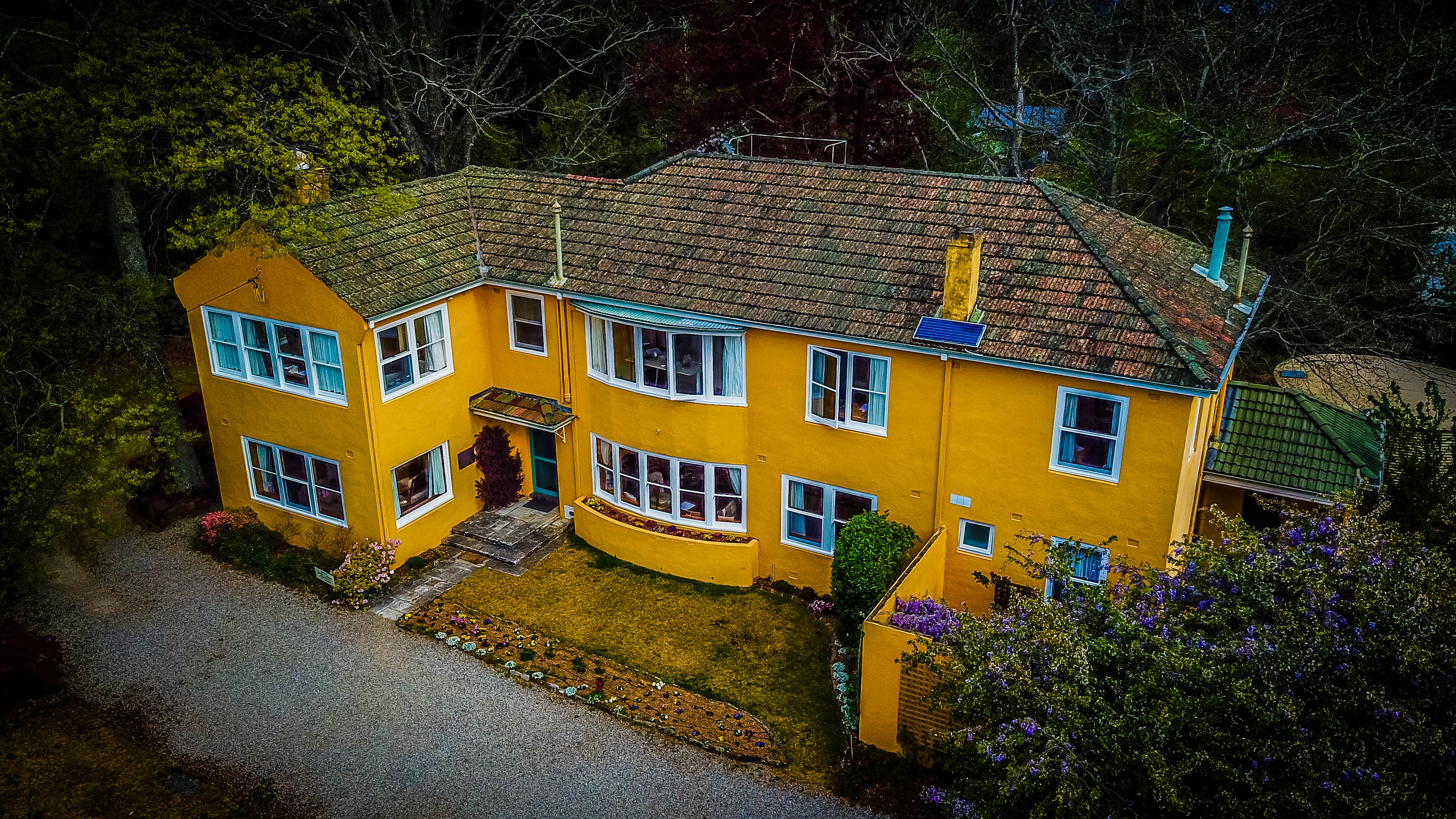
Varuna, The Writers' House. Image by Black Forest Cherry Photography

Varuna, The National Writers’ House is Australia's national residential writers' house located in Katoomba, in the Blue Mountains, New South Wales, Australia. The former home of writers Eleanor and Eric Dark, it was gifted to the Australian public through The Eleanor Dark Foundation. Due to this act of philanthropy, Varuna has become an eminent residential program for writers.

Since 1989, Varuna has inspired the creation of new Australian writing and provided support for a writing community and growing alumni. Along with its Residential Program, Varuna also has a literary program, including the Blue Mountains Writers' Festival, Varuna Open Day and various workshops and consultations.

Varuna is a short walk from the centre of town, and a short walk from the edge of the escarpment looking down into the Jamison Valley.

In 2020, Varuna expanded its capacity to accommodate writers by building an accessible studio. This new building opens up opportunities for writers who have previously been unable to stay in residence at Varuna.

== Programming ==
The Varuna Residential Program supports intensive work, conversation and community for writers at all levels of experience and across a wide range of writing practice. The program runs continuously throughout the year with up to six writers, each with an identified project, invited to be in residence at Varuna at any one time. Each year Varuna hosts almost 200 writers’ residencies.

Varuna has also developed a range of online courses available throughout the year.

Varuna works within the broader community through its community engagement programs. It has an active Varuna Alumni program, the Blue Mountains Writers' Festival, Varuna Open Day and various writer development workshops, consultations and events.

== History ==
Varuna, named after the ancient Indian god of the heavens and the waters, was a home built, or rather rebuilt, on two acres of land by Eleanor Dark and Eric Dark in 1939. A bright and roomy house with modernist stucco exterior, larger than any other house in the neighbourhood, it has been described by Eleanor's biographer Barbara Brooks as 'a bit of a monument.' The studio, added later, still boasts Eleanor's sprawling desk scored with cigarette burns and a custom built cabinet with a separate drawer for each developing chapter. The house served as a focus for the local community of writers by playing host to book readings, launches, forums, festival events and curry nights.

=== Dark family ===
Eleanor Dark was an eminent Australian writer of the 20th century. She was born in 1901 in Sydney, Australia. She was the second of three children born to the poet, writer and parliamentarian, Dowell Philip O’Reilly and Eleanor McCulloch O'Reilly. On finishing school and unable to enter university, having failed mathematics, Eleanor learnt typing and took a secretarial job. In 1922 she married Eric Payten Dark, and in January 1923 the couple moved to Katoomba, where Eleanor wrote eight of her 10 novels, as well as short stories and articles. Her best known novel was the best-selling The Timeless Land (1941), the first part of a trilogy, with Storm of Time (1948) and No Barrier (1953).

Eric Payten Dark (1889–1987), Eleanor's husband, was a general practitioner who wrote books, articles and pamphlets on politics and medicine. Eric Dark was born in Mittagong, New South Wales and qualified as a medical practitioner at Sydney University in 1914, qualifying a year early because of the war. He was among the first hundred Australian doctors who sailed to England to join the Royal Army Medical Corps. Dark, who was recommended for the Military Cross after the battle of the Somme, was eventually awarded the Military Cross for his service at Passchendaele. Dark later became an active member of the Labor left in NSW, was involved in contemporary political debate and was a committed socialist, although, contrary to local rumour, was never a member of the Communist Party. His books include The World Against Russia and Who are the Reds.

Michael (Mick) Dark was the son of Eleanor and Eric Dark, and it was he who decided that Varuna, their family home, should become a gift to Australian literature in memory of his parents. Mick spent his childhood and youth living at Varuna. After the deaths of his parents, he did not want to sell Varuna for environmental and personal reasons, and in November 1987 he eagerly responded to a suggestion that it could become a residential writers' centre. In 1989 the Eleanor Dark Foundation was formed and Mick gifted the property to the Foundation.

Like his parents before him, Mick was a committed environmentalist. In the 1960s and 1970s he was a member of the Colong Committee (now Colong Foundation for Wilderness). He was also past President of the Lower and of the Upper Blue Mountains Conservation Societies, now combined as Blue Mountains Conservation Society, of which he was an Honorary Life member. He was also a member of Greenpeace and the Australian Conservation Foundation. He was the Life President of the Eleanor Dark Foundation Board, taking an active role in the life of Varuna until his death in 2015.

== Alumni ==
Varuna alumni include:

- Dianne Bates
- Gail Bell
- David Brooks
- Craig Cormick
- Tegan Bennett Daylight
- Robert Drewe
- Ali Cobby Eckermann
- Delia Falconer
- Peggy Frew
- Anna Goldsworthy
- Glenda Guest
- Steven Herrick
- Linda Jaivin
- Cate Kennedy
- Benjamin Law
- Melinda Marchetta
- Patti Miller
- Drusilla Modjeska
- Ewan Morrison
- Eileen Naseby
- Kristina Olsson
- Heather Rose
- Leni Shilton
- Margaret Simons
- Anne Summers
