= Anthropological Forum =

- Discipline: Anthropology
- Language: English
- Edited by: Laurent Dousset, Katie Glaskin, Nicholas Harney

Publication details
- History: 1963-present
- Publisher: Taylor & Francis on behalf of the University of Western Australia (Australia)
- Frequency: Quarterly
- Impact factor: 1.000 (2017)

Standard abbreviations
- ISO 4: Anthropol. Forum

Indexing
- ISSN: 0066-4677 (print); 1469-2902 (web)

Links
- Journal homepage

Anthropological Forum (AF) is a scientific journal in anthropology and comparative sociology. It was founded in 1963 by Ronald Berndt: at the University of Western Australia and is sponsored by the Berndt Museum of Anthropology in Perth. In its early years of existence, it published widely on Aboriginal Australian issues, but has since developed to include anthropological studies of all cultural and geographical areas as well as on a wide range of theoretical issues.

Successive editors were Ronald Berndt (1963–1985), followed by John Gordon (1988–2000) and Robert Tonkinson (2000–2011). The current editors are Laurent Dousset, Katie Glaskin and Nicholas Harney. In addition, the journal has Mitchell Low as Associate Editor and Sean Martin-Iverson as Book Review Editor.

== Abstracting and indexing ==
The journal is abstracted and indexed in:

- Anthropological Index Online
- Anthropological Literature
- CSA Worldwide Political Science Abstracts
- APAIS: Australian Public Affairs Information Service
- Current Abstracts
- International Bibliography of the Social Sciences
- Linguistics and Language Behavior Abstracts
- OCLC
- SCOPUS
- Sociological Abstracts
- Thomson Social Sciences Citation Index
- Social SciSearch and Journal Citation Reports / Social Sciences Edition

According to the Journal Citation Reports, the journal has a 2017 impact factor of 1.000, ranking 38 out of 85 in the category "Anthropology". According to SJR (Scimago Journal & Country Rank), it has a H Index of 17.
