= Torres Strait Light Infantry Battalion =

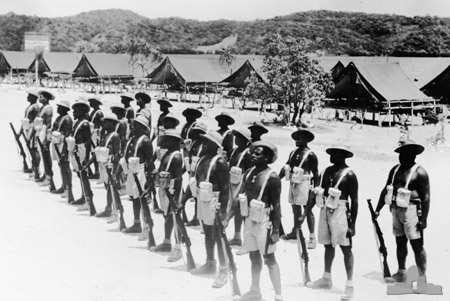
- Members of the Torres Strait Light Infantry Battalion on Thursday Island 1945
- Active: 1941–46
- Country: Australia
- Branch: Australian Army
- Type: Light infantry
- Size: ~ 500 men
- Part of: Torres Strait Force
- Engagements: Second World War

Insignia
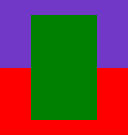
- Unit colour patch

The Torres Strait Light Infantry Battalion was an infantry battalion of the Australian Army during the Second World War. Initially raised as a company-sized unit in 1941, it was expanded to a full battalion in 1942 and was unique in that almost all of its enlisted men were Torres Strait Islanders, making the battalion the only Indigenous Australian battalion ever formed by the Australian Army. The battalion was used mainly in the garrison role, defending the islands of the Torres Strait at the northern tip of Queensland, although in 1943 a detachment was sent to patrol Dutch New Guinea. Following the end of the war, the battalion was disbanded in 1946.

== History ==
The Torres Strait Light Infantry Battalion was initially formed as an independent infantry company of just over 100 men in May 1941, after the Australian government became concerned about the possibility of conflict in the Pacific and sought to free up other units for service elsewhere. Recruitment for the company was impacted by the pearling season, but by December 1941 the company was adequately manned and assumed a mobile reserve role; as enlistments continued to grow throughout early 1942 a labour company was also established, eventually adopting the title of the Torres Strait Employment Company.

In June 1942, following Japan's entry into the war the previous December, the decision was made to expand the unit and an appeal for further volunteers was sent out. The response from the Islanders was considerable, with 830 Torres Strait Islander men joining the ranks throughout the course of the war—almost every man eligible—a total equal to about one fifth of the population of the Torres Strait at the time. In addition, a further 40 Torres Strait Malays and Aboriginals were recruited. By July, the garrison in the Torres Strait was augmented with the arrival of the 14th Garrison Battalion, and the Torres Strait Infantry Company was allocated a reserve role in support of 'B' Company, 14th Garrison Battalion in defence of the Horn Island airfield.

The Torres Strait Infantry Company was further expanded by absorbing the employment company, and on 1 March 1943, the unit was officially established as a full battalion under the command of Major John Uther (Jock) Swain, with an authorised strength of 17 officers and 470 men. After receiving full infantry training to the same standard as units of the 2nd AIF, the battalion carried out exercises with the 26th Battalion and the 5th Machine Gun Battalion on Prince of Wales Island. It was organised into four rifle companies, designated 'A' to 'D', and spread out across the Torres Strait, including Horn Island, Goode Island, and Thursday Island, where it formed part of Torres Strait Force and served as an integral part of the Islands' defences against Japanese air raids. Later, in May 1943, due to the overwhelming number of recruits, a pioneer company consisting of 160 men was also formed. This meant that the battalion could be released from labouring and constructing tasks to focus on defence.

Between October and December 1943, a detachment from the battalion was sent to Dutch New Guinea, where they carried out patrol operations in search of Japanese occupation. On 23 December, they were involved in a skirmish with a group of Japanese, during which one member of the battalion was killed and six wounded. In mid-1944, the various elements of the battalion were brought together on Thursday Island as it was determined the outposts were no longer needed. At this time the battalion was reorganised, and formed a transportation company, which also took over responsibility for terminal operations and water transport.

Due to the racial policies in place at the time, all officers and senior non-commissioned officers were white Australians, while the Torres Strait Islanders originally only received one third of the pay of white soldiers of equal rank. In response to this and other concerns, 'A', 'B' and 'C' Companies of the battalion briefly went on strike in late December 1943. In February 1944 the Army agreed to increase the soldiers' pay to two-thirds of that of white soldiers. The indigenous soldiers finally received full back pay for their war service in 1986. Despite the discriminatory pay scales the Islanders generally appreciated the Army's culture, as its discipline and hierarchy allowed them to be treated with respect by white soldiers.

The unit was unique, being the only Indigenous Australian battalion ever formed by the Australian Army, and although a number of small irregular units were formed to provide surveillance of isolated parts of the northern Australian coast, the majority of Indigenous Australians who enlisted during the war served in integrated units, with the exigencies of wartime emergency resulting in significant changes both to official policy and social attitudes regarding the service of Aboriginals and Torres Strait Islanders in the military. The Torres Strait Island Light Infantry Battalion represented a significant contribution to the Australian war effort in terms of population, with the majority of able bodied Torres Strait Islander males of military age serving during the war. The battalion was disbanded in 1946, following the end of hostilities. A total 36 members of the battalion died on active service.

'C' Company of the 51st Battalion, Far North Queensland Regiment (51 FNQR) was established in the Torres Strait in 1987 as a Regional Force Surveillance Unit (RFSU) responsible for sovereignty patrols in the Torres Strait and providing security to the remote parts of Northern Australia. A number of descendants of men who served in the Torres Strait Light Infantry have served within 51 FNQR. The last surviving member of the Torres Strait Light Infantry Battalion, Mebai Warusam, died in July 2023.

== Commanding officers ==
The following officers commanded the battalion during the war:

- Major John Uther Swain (1942–1944);
- Major Charles Frederick Mayne Godtschalk (1944–1946).

== See also ==
- Donald Thomson
- Kapiu Masi Gagai
- Snake Bay Patrol
