= Ray Raiwala =

Australian Aboriginal soldier (c. 1907–1965)

Ray Raiwala or Raiwalla (c. 1907 - 21 February 1965) was an Aboriginal leader and soldier from Arnhem Land in the Northern Territory of Australia. He was a Yolngu man, from the Miltjingi (Mildjingi/Malijinga) clan, and he was born in the Glyde River area.

In 1929 he was charged with murder and sentenced to death, later commuted to life imprisonment. He was later released after it was recognised that he had the right to practice Aboriginal customary law, this led to his release in 1934. In the 1930s he worked with anthropologist Donald Thomson and then, in World War II joined the Northern Territory Special Reconnaissance Unit where he served with Thomson.

== Early life ==
Life is known of Raiwala's early live in Arnhem Land and the names of his parents were not recorded, It is known that, as a young man, he made occasional visits to the Methodist mission at Milingimbi Island (Yurruwi) where he was first recorded by Europeans when a visiting American anthropologist Lloyd Warner, who was there between 1926 and 1929, recorded his defence of a friend there. Warner recorded Raiwala's name as 'Raiola'.

In 1927 Raiwala was again recorded at being at the Milingimbi Mission when he witnessed the missionary Thomas Theodor Webb being assaulted and James Robertson, the lay pastor, being speared. Because of this he was called as a crown witness to the trial of the men who were charged for this crime; they were each found guilty and sentenced to three years in jail.

== Murder charge ==
Then in 1929 Raiwala was charged with murder, alongside three others, following the death of a self proclaimed medicine man at the mission who was believed to have caused the death of several people at the mission through the use of sorcery. He was tried in Darwin and, in May 1930, found guilty and sentenced to death with this sentence soon being changed to life imprisonment at Fannie Bay Gaol. The trial received significant press coverage and concerns were raised about how the European justice system could deal with Aboriginal people who felt obliged, under traditional law, to wound or kill others. Based on this it was proposed that a 'court of native affairs' be created and, in addition, legislation was passed which removed the mandatory death penalty from such cases. Based on a reconsideration of the case the four men were released from jail in February 1934.

Following is release from jail Raiwala returned to Milingimbi and soon after married Mary Burramullagalli, likely through the church there, and, within eight years, he married twice more through tribal marriage.

== Work with Donald Thomson ==
In 1935 he met anthropologist Donald Thomson who used the mission as a base for his research about Yolngu peoples in east Arnhem Land and employed him as a guide and interpreter. They travelled together from August to December 1935. Thomson would later credit Raiwala for the success of his time there saying:

The success of the journey owed much to the faithfulness of a man of the Mildjingi clan, of the lower Glyde River, Raiwalla, who, although he had never been in that country and did not know its people, accompanied me and stood by my side as faithfully as any white companion would have done. When the carriers began deserting at night, leaving us without sufficient men to carry our load, at considerable personal risk and with very real tact, he always succeeded in persuading sufficient to go on just a bit further to enable us to replace them, and so to carry on. As they tired and lagged behind, Raiwalla dropped behind with them and often himself carried the bulk of their loads. Throughout the whole of the journey he was always cheerful, keeping the others who were ill at ease away from their territory, in happy mood, by his cheerful manner and jokes.

— Donald Thomson as quoted in "Donald Thomson in Arnhem Land" (1983)

Thomson would then return in June 1936 and Raiwala (and one of his wives) was waiting for him in Darwin and together they visited numerous communities in western Arnhem Land. As a part of this trip they also investigated killings which had taken place in the area; these are often referred to as the Caledon Bay crisis. After this trip Thomson remained with Raiwala, mostly on his country on the Arafura Swamp and based from Darby Creek (Katji), from October 1936 to July 1937 and Raiwala taught him about his way of life and how to hunt magpie geese using a special type of canoe. Thomson recorded from Raiwala that the female bird was called miyalk and the male tirnanyu and the details of their life cycle there.

== World War II service ==
In 1941, five years after Thomson left the area, he returned to establish the Northern Territory Special Reconnaissance Unit during World War II which was made up primarily of Aboriginal men. Raiwala was the first recruit and enlisted, in Darwin, on 6 February 1942 and was instrumental in recruiting Yolngu men from throughout Arnhem Land.

Raiwala was referred to as a corporal but this title was never formally given to him and he was formally enlisted as a private. He, like the other men, was trained in guerrilla fighting, reconnaissance and scouting but, unlike them, and as an enlisted soldier he was the only one to be issued with a rifle. He then led patrols at Blue Mud Bay and Trial Bay (Gurka’wuy) before being discharged from the army on 7 May 1943 when the unit closed.

Earlier in 1943 Raiwala had been offered a discharge after, during a visit to Townsville to visit his family, he found that one of his wives and two of his children had been taken from there to somewhere inland. This discharge was offered in order to give him an opportunity to search for his family but he insisted in remaining to complete his role.

Reflecting on his time in the unit Thomson said:

He established a reputation throughout Eastern Arnhem Land for his fighting prowess, and when enlisted he devoted the whole of his energies and influence to the work of undermining and destroying Japanese influence and prestige, and to assisting with the formation and training of the unit. Railwalla made many long, hard patrols over all sorts of country, often pressing through the night without rest, in order to keep faith and to arrive at a rendezvous time. This man's unfaltering loyalty and whole-hearted devotion, more than any other single factor, contributed to the building up of the Unit and the maintenance of order and discipline.

— Donald Thomson as quoted in "Donald Thomson in Arnhem Land" (1983)

Notably he was paid for his war time service and, in 1963, he applied and was awarded a war medal and his Returned from Active Service Badge.

== Later life ==
After the war Raiwala preferred to live away from the missions and on his own country. In 1949 Raiwala was believed to have died when he was rumoured to have been murdered. A search for him was made on foot by patrol officer Syd Kyle-Little and a police officer John Gordon but they found him safe and well at Mainoru. From 1952 when he lived with family at a timber-mill on the Cobourg Peninsula until the early 1960s.

In 1963 he and his first wife, Mary Burramullagalli, were living at the Bagot Community in Darwin and were given full citizenship status meaning that they were no longer considered wards of the state as other Aboriginal people were.

Raiwala died on 21 February 1965 in Darwin.

== Legacy ==
Raiwalla Court in Ngunnawal, Australian Capital Territory is named for him.
