= David Burrumarra =

Indigenous Australian leader (1917–1994)

David Burrumarra (1917 – 13 October 1994) was a Yolŋu man who was a philosopher, diplomat and leader from Arnhem Land in the Northern Territory of Australia.

== Life ==
Burrumarra was born during the dry season at Wadanayu, a bible camp, on Galiwin'ku (Elcho Island). He was the son of Ganimburrngu (Lanygarra), and his wife Wanambiwuy; Wanambiwuy was a Bararrngu woman. On his birth Burrumarra became a member of the Warramirri tribe and he had totemic associations with the whale and octopus. In his mother's tongue Burrumarra refers the skeleton of the white-tiled stingray. Because of their association with the sea, and long existing trading routes with the Macassan traders from Indonesia, his family had a long history of mediating the presence of outsiders of their land and, Burrumarra in particular was identified by his family as being one to learn non-First Nations ways.

Burrumarra's father died when he was a young child and, by 1923, was living at Milingimbi Island (Yurruwi) at a mission established by the Methodist Inland Mission which was established there; this was known as Milingimbi Mission. Years later he began working as a shell cleaner and deckhand on the Tubumaro, a Japanese pearling ship, in the seas surrounding the Crocodile Islands.

In the early 1930s Burrumarra also travelled with Methodist missionary Wilbur Chaseling and helped him find a location for the next mission established at Yirrkala and helped with tis establishment. In doing so he spoke to many clan leaders who had been at his initiation. When the mission was established in 1935 Burrumarra worked there, under the lead of Clyde Toft, as a domestic workers and kitchen hand. He worked alongside Fijian missionary Kolinio Saukuru. While at Yirrkala he married Clara, a Mara woman from the Roper River region, she had been taken there by trepang fishermen.

During World War II Burrumarra supervised other Yolŋu workers in the construction the Royal Australian Airforce base at Nhulunbuy. He was also involved in postal deliveries, through the Northern Territory Special Reconnaissance Unit, throughout the region and often patrolled coastal areas between Yirrkala, Milingimbi and Galiwin’ku in watch for signs of incoming attack. While on patrol he reported locations and movements to Darwin and was trained to fight as a 'guerrilla agent' using weapons like spears and woomeras to engage in combat. He was selected for this role because of his knowledge of the Country, bushcraft and survival skills and, although he didn't have a service number during this period, he did serve his country.

In 1946, after the end of the war, Burrumarra moved back to Galiwin’ku at the request of his cousin Batangga (also recorded as Badanga) who was a Wangurri leader. There he was employed as a community liaison officer. One of his key strengths in this role was his ability to speak at least eight Yolŋu languages and English. While in this position he would also, for a small fee, use his typewriter to type up letters for community members; the novelty of this technology created considerable excitement. He was later the first Yolŋu teaching assistant at the school and taught Gupapuyngu language to the students there. While doing this he also travelled regularly with missionary Harold Shepherdson and they would fly to areas to establish outstations of the Methodist Missions and deliver supplies and conduct church services. In 1946 his wife Clara died and, in the late 1940s, he remarried Lawuk, a Galpu woman.

In the 1950s Burrumarra was elected the Galiwin’ku village council as secretary and, as a senior member of the community, was able to advocate for the coexistence of Yolŋu ceremony and the Christian church; he state 'we believed both ways'. In the same period he also began working with anthropologists Ronald and Catherine Berndt and Donald Thomson as well as archaeologists like John Mulvaney; and, in doing so, he considered himself to be Australia's first Aboriginal anthropologist. Despite this he had a certain level of contempt for anthropologists, and others in similar positions, and claimed they took up valuable time from himself and his people and took them away from their families and other responsibilities.

In a letter the Ronald Berndt in 1988 he wrote:

Aboriginal people are like a huge boil. The anthropologist wants to squeeze it to get everything out. What they don't realise is that when they squeeze us with their questions, we all feel pain.

— David Burrumarra, personal correspondence to Ronald Berndt (1988)

In 1957, alongside Batangga, Burrumarra instigated the 'Adjustment Movement in Arnhem Land' at Galiwin’ku and, as a part of this numerous madayin (sacred wooden objects) were displayed for the first time. This was an attempt to reconcile Yolŋu and Christian beliefs and the unify Yolŋu people; this was not received well by a number of Yolŋu people and caused contention within the community.

In 1962 Burrumarra travelled around Australia, following the passing of an amendment to the Commonwealth Electoral Act 1918 in 1962 which allowed First Nations Australians to vote (see: Voting rights of Indigenous Australians). Also in the 1960s he advocated for the creation of the Gapuwiyak community as a part of the outstation movement.

In 1978 Burrumarra was awarded an Member of the Order of the British Empire (MBE) by the governor general, Sir Zelman Cowan at Galiwin’ku for services to 'Aboriginal community development, education and anthropology'. When given the award he insisted that Cowan, and other visiting dignitaries, wear sacred Warramiri whale and lightning caftans which he designed himself for the event.

In 1988, as a part of a call for a treaty with First Nations people, Burrumarra designed a Warramiri flag and encouraged First Nations and non-First Nations people to talk about this issue. he called for groups from around Australia to create their own flags. He asked that these flags each, like his, contained a Union Jack, on the corner of each as a symbol of not only the coloniser but also the coming of Christianity to Australia. This flag is painted on a board and is now on permanent display at the law school of the University of New South Wales.

Burrumarra died on 13 October 1994 at Galiwin’ku.

Following his death Wes Lanhupuy, Burrumarra's adopted son, honoured him in the Northern Territory Legislative Assembly stating:

It would be difficult for me to explain the intellect of this old man. He had a great capacity to understand both of the worlds in which he lived and to accept the new way of life in the Christian society that was being introduced to Aboriginal people.

— Wes Lanhupuy, Address to the NT Legislative Assembly, 23 November 1994

== Resources about ==
McIntosh, Ian and Burrumarra, David. (1994) The whale and the cross : conversation with David Burrumarra MBE. Historical Society of the Northern Territory, Darwin.
