= Bertha Strehlow =

Australian editor and anthropologist (1911–1984)

- Born: Bertha Gwendoline Alexandra James; 16 April 1911; Adelaide, Australia
- Died: 30 June 1984 (aged 73)
- Education: University of Adelaide (BA)
- Children: 3

Bertha Gwendoline Alexandra Strehlow (née James; 16 April 1911 – 30 June 1984) was an educator and pioneer, the first wife of Ted Strehlow, an anthropologist and linguist who worked primarily with the Arrernte People. Strehlow was her husband's main supporter, and edited his works; she also published some accounts of their activities.

== Early life and education ==
Bertha Gwendoline Alexandra James was born on 16 April 1911 in Adelaide to George Pugh James and Rosamond Delila (née Murdoch), who died of influenza in 1919. Shortly after her mother's death, her father married Edith Mary Eaton.

She attended St Peter's Girls School and, in her final year, was head prefect. In 1932 she commenced a Bachelor of Arts at the University of Adelaide, where she met Ted Strehlow; she completed her degree in 1934 and began teaching at Walford School.

She married Ted Strehlow on 21 December 1935 and, the next year, they travelled to Alice Springs on The Ghan railway.

== Life in the Northern Territory ==
The newly married Strehlows arrived in Alice Springs on 18 February 1936, and immediately travelled to Hermannsburg, where Ted had grown up, where they stayed with the family of Friedrich Wilhelm Albrecht. During this time, they started preparations for their 'honeymoon', a 1,400-mile (2,300 km) camel trek through the Petermann Ranges, a part of Ted's role as a Patrol Officer for the Central Australian region. Their journey commenced on 5 June 1936, and they returned to Hermannsburg on 25 September 1936. During this journey, Strehlow had a miscarriage and almost died; she was saved due to the intervention of an Aboriginal woman. It is possible that, during this trip, Strehlow was the first white woman to see Kata Tjuta and Uluru.

The Strehlows moved in to a tent at the Jay Creek Settlement on 29 May 1937; in early 1938 Strehlow had another miscarriage. Also in 1938 the couple had a house built using 2000 bricks that had been handmade by Ted and three Aboriginal friends. They moved in during mid-1938.

In 1939, Strehlow suffered a fourth miscarriage, at the same time as facing additional pressure with the outbreak of World War II when Ted was accused in parliament of being a Nazi and, as he put it, 'the most hated man in Central Australia'. During this time, in May 1942, Strehlow gave birth to Theo Strehlow (named for his father) and, shortly after this, on 26 May 1942, her husband was called up for military service. Strehlow went to stay at her parents' house in Adelaide, initially just for the period Ted would be gone; this move would however turn out to be permanent.

== Later life ==
In Adelaide, in 1944, Strehlow gave birth to a daughter, Shirley; following the end of the war, a final child, John, was born. The family remained in Adelaide, where Ted lectured in English and Linguistics at University of Adelaide and Strehlow started teaching at the Walford Girls School again.

Between 1950 and 1952, Ted took an extended study tour of Europe, and Strehlow rented out rooms in their house for additional income, as she struggled financially. In 1951, Strehlow began teaching at the Wilderness School and, in November, became vice president of Tatlers, a women’s literary club, founded by Strehlow's longterm friend Roma Mitchell. In 1956, she became its president.

Ted left Strehlow in 1968 and, in 1972, she filed for divorce on the grounds of desertion. At the trial, presided over by her friend Roma Mitchell, she did not seek maintenance and said that her salary was ample for her needs; she did not ask for a clause in the divorce about Ted's will, which ultimately led to both her and her children being disinherited. On 25 September of the same year, Ted married his research assistant.

On 30 June 1984, shortly after a visit to her son, John, in London, Strehlow died of a heart attack; she was 73 years old.

== Publications ==
Most of the information about Strehlow's life come from her published articles:

- Strehlow, B. (1940). Through Central Australia. Walkabout, vol. 6, no. 10. URL: https://trove.nla.gov.au/version/259202940
- Strehlow, B. (1945). A camel trip to the Petermann Ranges across Central Australia. Royal Geographical Society of Australasia. URL: https://trove.nla.gov.au/version/22435354
- Strehlow, B. (1949) Glimpses of Lubra Life in Central Australia. Aborigines Friends Association Annual Report, p. 33

And her letters to her husband Ted (1935 - 1960) and her mother-in-law Frieda (1936), which are held in the Strehlow Research Centre.

== Legacy ==
Strehlow's life has been celebrated by:

- A 2015 exhibition at The Women's Museum of Australia; in collaboration with the Strehlow Research Centre and the Old Lutheran Church History Centre entitled: "Desert honeymoon: Bertha Strehlow and the Petermann Ranges Expedition".
- Is the focus of Leni Shilton's 2016 PhD thesis: "Giving voice to silence: Uncovering Bertha Strehlow 's voice through poetry" and her 2018 follow up book: "Walking with camels : the story of Bertha Strehlow".
