= Northern Territory Special Reconnaissance Unit =

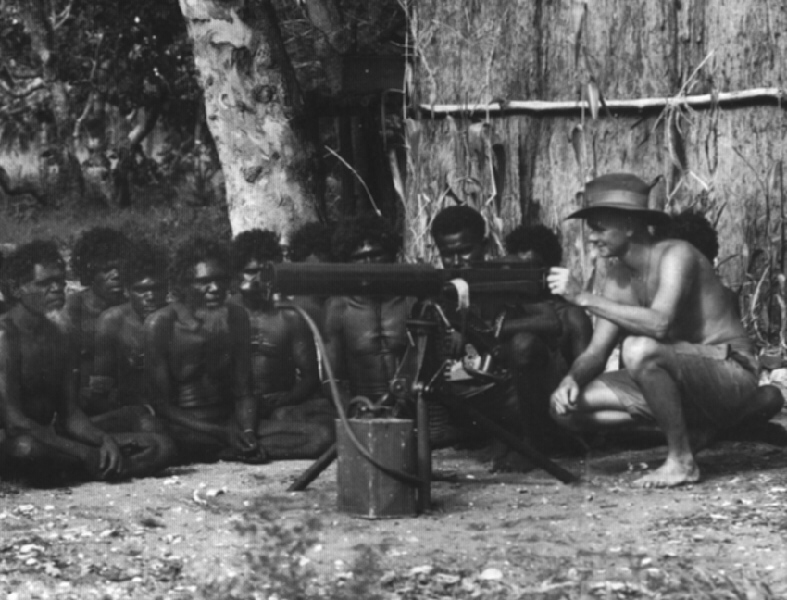
- Squadron Leader Donald Thomson training the NTSRU.
- Active: 1941–1943
- Country: Australia
- Branch: Australian Army
- Role: Reconnaissance
- Size: ~ 50–70 men
- Engagements: World War II

Commanders
- Notable commanders: Donald Thomson

The Northern Territory Special Reconnaissance Unit (NTSRU) was an irregular warfare unit of the Australian Army during World War II, composed mainly of Aboriginal people from the Northern Territory. Formed in 1941, the unit patrolled the coast of Arnhem Land during 1942–43 searching for signs of Japanese landings and trained to fight as guerrillas using traditional weapons in the event of an invasion. In 1943, as the war moved northward from the Australian coast, the NTSRU was disbanded.

== History ==
Wartime exigencies broke down previous resistance to the enlistment of non-Europeans in the armed forces, with the threat posed to Northern Australia by the Japanese from late-1941 resulting in the formation of a number of Aboriginal and Torres Strait Islander units such as the Torres Strait Light Infantry Battalion. In Northern Australia several irregular units were subsequently formed to utilise the local knowledge and bushcraft skills of the local Aboriginal people to provide surveillance of the more remote parts of the coastline, including the 2/1st North Australia Observer Unit based in Katherine, Northern Territory. Further north, east Arnhem Land was largely uninhabited except for a few Aboriginal Australians and unmapped prior to the war, but was considered a likely area for a possible Japanese landing.

Proposed in mid-1941, the NTSRU was subsequently formed between 12 February and 19 March 1942 under the command of Squadron Leader Donald Thomson, an anthropologist before the war with extensive experience working with the local Yolngu people in the 1930s, several of whom had previously been jailed for killing five Japanese pearlers and three Europeans during the Caledon Bay crisis in 1932–33. Thomson had been seconded to the Army from the Royal Australian Air Force in June to raise and command the unit. NTSRU personnel included 50 Aboriginal men (such as the Yolngu elder Wonggu Mununggurr and his sons), six Solomon Islanders, a Torres Strait Islander and several white non-commissioned officers, the unit patrolled the coast of Arnhem Land during 1942–43 searching for signs of Japanese landings and trained to fight as guerrillas using traditional weapons in the event of an invasion while reporting on enemy movements towards Darwin. Thomson did not arm the members of the NTSRU with rifles as he believed that this would expose them to identification and retaliation by Japanese forces in the event of an invasion.

Meanwhile, similar units were raised on Bathurst Island, Melville Island (including the Snake Bay Patrol), the Cox Peninsula and Groote Eylandt. In 1943, as the war moved northward from the Australian coast, the NTSRU was disbanded, and Thomson returned to the Air Force. He was later badly injured in action in Dutch New Guinea, and spent the rest of the war in hospital before being medically discharged. None of the men that served in these irregular units were formally enlisted or paid during the war; however, in 1992 their service was formally acknowledged by the Federal Government with the receipt of pay and service medals. As of 2026 the Solomon Islanders have not been officially recognised for their participation.

== Notable people ==
- David Burrumarra
- Binyinyuwuy Djarrankuykuy
- Kapiu Masi Gagai
- Wonggu Mununggurr
- Ray Raiwala
- Donald Thomson

== See also ==
- Regional Force Surveillance Units
