= Naseby (disambiguation) =

Naseby is a village in Northamptonshire, England.

Naseby may also refer to:

- Battle of Naseby, a decisive 1645 battle of the First English Civil War fought near the village
- Naseby, New Zealand, a small town on the South Island of New Zealand
- Naseby an English Navy ship of the line
- Eileen Naseby (born 1943), Australian author

== See also ==
- Naisby, a surname
