= Gagai (disambiguation) =

Dane Gagai (born 1991) is an Australian-born rugby league footballer.

Gagai or variations may also refer to:

- Hausa for aphrodisiac, a type of drug
- Indonesian for climbing
- Gagae (also spelled "Gagai"), ancient town in Antalya Province, Turkey
- G'ag'ai (died c. 1600), Later Jin dynasty statesman
- Gagai (surname)
- Găgâi, a tributary of the Amaradia river in southern Romania
