= Binyinyuwuy Djarrankuykuy =

- Born: circa 1928; Ramingining
- Died: 1982
- Other names: Dick Binyinyuwuy Djarrankuykuy, Bininuwui, Binjinjowi, Bininyiwui, Binyinyuwuy Djarrankuykuy, Bininyiwuy, Binanyui, Bininjuwi, Binyinuwuy, Binyinyuway
- Known for: Bark painting, Indigenous Australian art
- Children: Judy Lirrinyin

Dick Binyinyuwuy Djarrankuykuy (c. 1928–1982) was a leading Aboriginal artist from the island of Milingimbi off the coast of the Northern Territory of Australia. He belonged to the Djarrankuykuy clan of the Djambarrpuyngu people. During World War II he was among the group of Aboriginal men enlisted by Squadron Leader Donald Thomson for the Northern Territory Special Reconnaissance Unit to protect Australia's northern shoreline from Japanese invasion. He became an artist after the war, in the 1950s.

== Biography ==
Binyinyuwuy was born in 1928 in Ramingining, in central Arnhem Land, Australia. He belongs to the Djambarrpuyngu language group of the Dhuwa moiety. Djambarrpuyngu is both a language group and a clan, with most of its members living in Milingimbi, like Binyinyuwuy and Galiwin’ku. As a young man, he moved to the island of Milingimbi, just off the northern coast of Arnhem Land. The town of Milingimbi was established by Reverend James Watson from the Methodist Overseas Mission in 1916, and later re-established in 1951 after the residents were evacuated during World War II. The many missionaries at the settlement, like T. T. Webb and Edgar Wells, promoted and encouraged the people to continue making art.

In 1948, Binyinyuwuy, as part of Charles Mountford's American-Australian Scientific Expedition to Arnhem Land, helped archeologist Frank Setzler excavate a Makassan well. Later, during the war, Binyinyuwuy became part of Donald Thomson's Northern Territory Special Reconnaissance Unit (NTSRU). Binyinyuwuy and a group of other young Yolngu men were thus charged with safeguarding the coast of their home, Arnhem Land, from enemy invaders, like the Japanese army, from 1941 to 1943. The unit was later disbanded as the threat of a Japanese landing in Arnhem Land decreased. No longer a soldier, Binyinyuwuy returned to his life.

In the 1950s, Binyinyuwuy, a young "rebel" at the time, was raiding shops and disturbing the young women at the mission station. His activity came to the attention of the superintendent at the time, Reverend Edgar Wells, when he left a message saying he would repeat his actions. Binyinyuwuy declared his resentment towards the presence of the balanda (white fella) and mission on his people's land. Concerned that Binyinyuwuy would continue to raid his stores, Wells approached the community's leaders to ask them how he should proceed. By this time, Binyinyuwuy had already established himself in this Indigenous community as a skilled painter and maker of ceremonial objects. The elders told Wells of his skill in painting and creating sacred objects, and Wells declared that if Binyinyuwuy gave him one of his bark paintings, he would not be punished for his crimes. Binyinyuwuy agreed to these terms. When Wells saw the painting, he admired it so much that he added young Binyinyuwuy to a list of paid artists providing artworks to the mission station. Thus Binyinyuwuy's career as an artist began. Ann Wells, Edgar's wife, said that "Art was the touchstone that brought us the friendship of Binanyui." He grew to be an influential artist in his community and abroad, both because of his skill, and because of his high ritual authority. Binyinyuwuy, along with his brother Djatjiwuy, was active in ceremonial life, which allowed him to create sand sculptures and sacred objects. As he grew older, Binyinyuwuy became a central part of ceremonial life in his community, participating in the wurrpan (emu) ceremony, and his works were featured in many different collections at various museums across the globe. Another ceremony Binyinyuwuy took part in was in 1946; he participated in the Makarrata at Milingimbi. This is a ceremony to resolve disputes and tensions among the Yongu. He kept making ceremonial objects and paintings until his death in 1982.

Binyinyuwuy was once tried for murder, as he was accused of throwing spears that killed a man in Darwin with Bungawuy, Ngalandirr and Dayngangan, all men he was living with.

Inspired by her father, his daughter Judy Lirrinyin has also become a celebrated artist of her own generation, working through the Milingimbi Arts and Culture.

== Career ==
Binyinyuwuy had a high ritual authority, which meant his paintings could reflect a diverse range of subjects. This included the king brown snake, honey, olive python, and hollow log ceremony belonging to his mother's clan.

One of Binyinyuwuy's earlier paintings was called Banumbirr (morning star), and was collected by Charles Mountford during the 1948 AASEAL expedition. He was a guardian of Morning Star ceremony and many of his more important paintings depict Morning Star ceremonial poles. He is alo known for painting the Yirritja honey bee design (Niwuda) c. 1960. This design celebrates the communal joy associated with collecting sugarbag (wild honey). Binyinyuwuy is known for the elegance of his bark paintings, and his use of warm colours in some of his work. He was recognized alongside other prolific painters in his community, like Tom Djäwa and David Malangi. Today, his work can be found at many important museums in Australia, such as the Art Gallery of New South Wales, as well as the National Museum of Australia. It is partly due to his success that the art industry continues to flourish in Milingimbi to this day.

Another one of Binyinyuwuy's pieces, Rain in the trees c. 1959, depicts the often extreme weather that can ravage Arnhem Land during the wet season. It shows rain and lightning painted in bands across the bottom of the piece, with trees at the top.

Binyinyuwuy, while most known for painting on bark, also created art across other media, including painting the only piece on paper collected from Milingimbi in the 1950s. Fred McCarthy, from the Australian museum in Sydney, came to Milingimbi in August 1948 as part of the American and Australian Scientific Expedition to Arnhem land, gave the paintings to him. Binyinyuwuy was seen photographed with McCarthy many times on that trip. Also, Binyinyuwuy was known to create sculptures. While rare, many of these sculptures have been collected and placed in various galleries. One of Binyinyuwuy's sculptures depicts a Bajini, a mythical person for the yongu, depicted in the Djanggawal song cycle. This piece was collected by Edward Ruhe, an Aboriginal art collector, and now the piece is in the Kluge Ruhe museum.

== Collections ==
- Art Gallery of New South Wales
- Kluge-Ruhe Aboriginal Art Collection of the University of Virginia
- National Gallery of Australia
- National Gallery of Victoria
- National Museum of Australia

== Significant exhibitions ==
- 2007: One sun, One moon: Aboriginal Art in Australia. Art Gallery of New South Wales, Sydney, 03 Jul 2007–02 Dec 2007
- 2017: Art from Milingimbi: Taking Memories Back. Art Gallery of New South Wales, Sydney, 12 Nov 2016–29 Jan 2017
- 2019: Reinvigorating the MECA Collection. Charles Darwin University Gallery, Darwin, 28 Mar 2019–20 Jul 2019
