= Gagai (surname) =

Gagai is a surname. Notable people with the surname include:

- Dane Gagai (born 1991), Professional rugby league footballer
- Jacob Gagai, Australian rugby league footballer
- Kapiu Masi Gagai (c. 1894–1946), Indigenous Australian soldier
