= Strelow =

Strelow is a surname. Notable people with the surname include:

- Hans Strelow (1922–1942), German fighter pilot in World War II
- Janina Strelow (born 1996), German politician
- Justus Strelow (born 1996), German biathlete
- Margaret Strelow, Australian politician
- Siegfried Strelow (1911–1943), German U-boat commander in World War II
- Warren Strelow (1934–2007), American ice hockey goaltending coach

== See also ==
- Strehlow
