= Snake Bay Patrol =

- Active: 1942-1945
- Country: Australia
- Branch: Royal Australian Navy
- Type: Auxiliary unit
- Role: Coastal patrol, search and rescue
- Size: 35 men
- Engagements: World War II

The Snake Bay Patrol was an auxiliary reconnaissance unit made up of Indigenous Australian residents of Melville Island in the Northern Territory that was raised by the Royal Australian Navy during World War II. The patrol was formed in 1942 and its members served on a full time basis. They did not receive any pay or official recognition for their service until 1962. Further payments were provided in 1991 in recognition of the men having been underpaid.

== History ==
After the first bombing raid on Darwin in 1942, special units consisting of Indigenous Australians were formed, one of which was the Snake Bay Patrol. The Snake Bay Patrol unit was established by Royal Australian Naval Volunteer Reserve officer Lieutenant J.W.B. Gribble during the Pacific War to detect any Japanese forces which landed on the island, with local Indigenous Australians being informally recruited and never formally enlisted into the military. The Patrol's 35 members served on a full-time basis, received firearms training, were issued naval uniforms and held naval ranks conferred by Gribble, but were not paid. Similar units were raised on Bathurst Island, the Cox Peninsula and Groote Eylandt.

During the war the Snake Bay Patrol conducted patrols along the shore of Melville Island, rescued downed Allied airmen and determined the location of naval mines. Two members of the Patrol are also believed to have formed part of reconnaissance parties landed on Timor from Allied submarines.

The former members of the Snake Island Patrol only became eligible for service medals and payments in recognition of their service in 1962. In December 1991 the few surviving members of the Patrol and the other auxiliary Indigenous units received compensation for not having been paid during the war, as well as the Defence Medal and War Medal; these were also provided to the next of kin of the members who had died by that time. The next year the surviving men became eligible for veteran's benefits under the Veterans’ Entitlements Act 1986.

== See also ==
- Northern Territory Special Reconnaissance Unit
- Torres Strait Light Infantry Battalion
