= Dzamalag =

Aboriginal Australian ceremony

Dzamalag was a form of ritualised ceremonial exchange or bartering practised by the Kunwinjku people of Western Arnhem Land in northern Australia. As described by the anthropologist Ronald Berndt in 1951, a dzamalag ritual would include dancing, singing, and the exchange of sexual favours and goods (especially tobacco) between the trading groups.

In David Graeber's Debt: The First 5,000 Years, he connects this phenomenon with "the myth of barter", or the argument that bartering was not the predominant method of exchange in ancient or prehistoric societies. Barter was really only used when dealing with strangers, or with those you could not trust to establish long-term (often credit) relations with.

The Kunwinjku people practised Dzamalag when they wished to exchange items with another moiety or party. An example of dzamalag held in the 1940s shows the main exchange being serrated spears and European cloth.

== Sources ==
- Graeber, David (2011). Debt: The First 5,000 Years. Melville House. ISBN 978-1-933633-86-2.
- Gudeman, Stephen (2001). "The anthropology of economy: community, market, and culture," Blackwell Publishing, p. 124-5.
- Oliver, Douglas L. (1989). "Oceania: the native cultures of Australia and the Pacific Islands, Volume 1", University of Hawaii Press, p. 514.
