= Naisby =

Naisby is a surname. Notable people with the surname include:

- Paul Naisby (born 1955), British swimmer
- Tom Naisby (1878–1927), English footballer

== See also ==
- Naseby (disambiguation)
