= Robert Tonkinson =

Australian anthropologist (1938–2024)

Robert Tonkinson (1938 – 6 June 2024) was an Australian social anthropologist. He was known for his studies of desert people in Western Australia, and was chair of anthropology at the University of Western Australia.

== Early life and education ==
Robert Tonkinson was born in 1938.

He studied anthropology with Ronald and Catherine Berndt at the University of Western Australia (UWA) in the 1960s. Soon after graduating with a bachelor's degree, he joined ethnographic filmmaker Ian Dunlop as an advisor on his first trip filming Martu people of the Western desert in 1965. The resulting film became part of a 19-part series of films made over six years, called People of the Australian Western Desert. In 1966, Dunlop edited four parts of the series to create a 49-minute film called Desert People, which went on to win several international awards.

Tonkinson received a Master of Arts from UWA in 1966 for his thesis "Social structure and acculturation of Aborigines in the Western Desert" from UWA.

Undertaking further studies and work in Canada, he earned a PhD with his thesis "Da:wajil : a Western Desert Aboriginal rainmaking ritual", from the University of British Columbia.

== Career ==
Upon return to Australia, Tonkinson worked at the Australian National University. He undertook a large amount of field research at Jigalong and in the Western Desert in Western Australia, as well as on the islands of Vanuatu.

He was appointed professor of anthropology at UWA in 1984 to succeed, Ronald Berndt, foundation professor of anthropology. On 23 April 1987, Tonkinson presented Berndt with an honorary of Doctor of Letters.

On his retirement, he was appointed emeritus Professor of Anthropology at UWA.

Tonkinson is well known for his contribution to Australian Aboriginal Studies but he is equally renowned for his work in the arena of Melanesian Studies—particularly in the application of kastom in the contemporary context.

In 1973–1975, following an assistant professorship at the University of Oregon, Tonkinson and his wife Dr Myrna Tonkinson conducted studies with Aboriginal people of the Western Desert, under grants from the Australian National University and the Australian Institute of Aboriginal Studies.

Myrna Tonkinson was closely associated with the Cobourg Peninsula Land Claim of 1979, with Nicolas Peterson supplying anthropological material in support of the claim.

Tonkinson was editor of Anthropological Forum from 2000 to 2011.

== Personal life and death ==
Tonkinson married Myrna.

He died on 6 June 2024 at Osborne Park Hospital in the Perth suburb of Osborne Park, after having developed dementia for some years previously, at the age of 87. A memorial was held for him on 11 June 2024.

== Publications ==
- Tonkinson, Robert (1968) Maate village, Efate: a relocated community in the New Hebrides Department of Anthropology, University of Oregon
- Tonkinson, Robert (1973) Aboriginal Victors of the Desert Crusade Cummings ISBN 0846575493
- Tonkinson, Robert (1991) The Mardu aborigines : living the dream in Australia's desert Holt, Rinehart and Winston ISBN 0030322820
- Tonkinson, Robert (editor) (2015) The Wentworth Lectures: Honouring Fifty Years of Australian Indigenous Studies Aboriginal Studies Press ISBN 9781922059734
