= Glenda Guest =

Australian novelist

Glenda Guest is an Australian novelist. Her novel, Siddon Rock, won the 2010 Commonwealth Writers' Prize, Best First Novel.

== Life ==
She grew up in Bruce Rock, Western Australia, but left that state when she was in her early 20s moving, first, to Canberra, then to Melbourne when her marriage dissolved. From there she moved around the eastern seaboard with her husband Colin. Glenda is currently living in Merimbula on the far south coast of NSW. Glenda is a strong supporter of Varuna, The Writers' House, where she did much of the writing for Siddon Rock. She teaches at Macquarie University, and Griffith University.

== Works ==
- Siddon Rock, was the creative component of Glenda's PhD undertaken at Griffith University, Gold Coast, at a time when creative writing post graduate degrees were rare. The novel takes the world literature mode of magic realism and locates it in the Australian landscape, something that had not previously been done in Australian literature. Siddon Rock was published by Random House Australia, 2009, ISBN 978-1-74166-640-3, and then won the Commonwealth Writers Prize, Best First Novel 2010. In that same year it was also long-listed for the Miles Franklin Award, short listed for the UTS Glenda Adams Award for New Writing, short listed ABIA best newcomer and short listed for the inaugural Randwick Literary Award 2010.
- A Week in the Life of Cassandra Aberline (Text Publishing, Melbourne) was released on 29 January 2018.
