= Kapiu Masi Gagai =

Indigenous Australian soldier (c. 1894–1946)

- Born: c. 1894; Mabuiag Island, Queensland
- Died: 1946; Thursday Island, Queensland

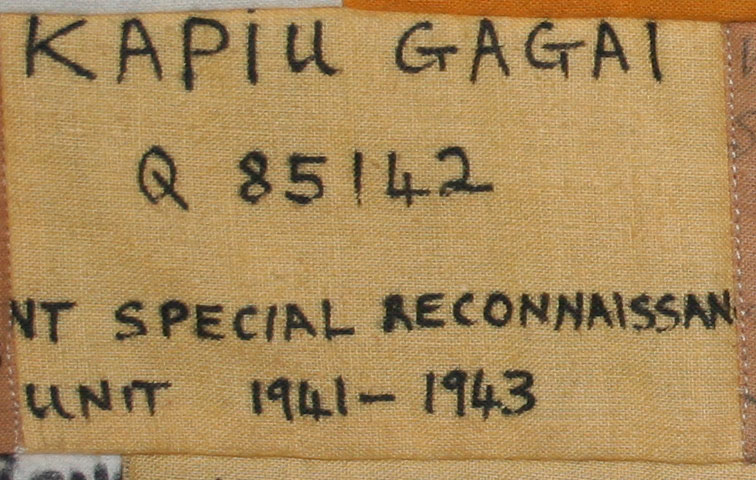
Kapiu Masi Gagai entry on the WWII Darwin Commemorative Quilt

Kapiu Masi Gagai (c. 1894 – 21 August 1946) was a Torres Strait Islander man who worked as a pearler, boatman, mission worker and Australian soldier during World War II.

== Biography ==
Gagai was born in around 1894 or 1895, on Mabuiag Island, which sits within the Torres Strait Islands. He was the second son of Newa Gagai and Kubi and he belonged to the Kodal (crocoldile) clan and the Badu Tribe and he grew up speaking Kalaw Lagaw Ya. As a child he was adopted through kupai omasker, a traditional practice of Torres Strait Islanders, by Nomoa and Kaidai. He attended school at the Badu Island School and also received religious instruction from the London Missionary Society and Church of England Missionaries.

From the age of 15 he worked on the pearling luggers active in the area and worked as a swimmer-diver for the Islander-owned pearling company Wakaid. On 22 December 1915 Gagai married Laina Getawan who was also from the Island; they would go on to have three children.

In June 1921 Gagai was recruited to work at the Goulburn Island Methodist Mission, at Warruwi on the Goulburn Islands, in Arnhem Land. He was recruited to work as a boat captain and lay mission worker by the Reverend James Watson who had started the mission.

Gagai's wife and children joined him there and later, at the mission he married Mujerambi (Marjorie) who was the daughter of Alfred Joseph Voules Brown. They would have ten children together.

In April 1932 Gagai decided to return to the Torres Strait and settled at Badu Island where he worked again as a pearler. Soon after, in May 1935, he was employed by anthropologist Donald Thomson to take charge of the St Nicholas, which was an auxiliary ketch. When Thomason left the area Gagai returned to his previous role.

On 27 October 1941 Gagai enlisted in the army and joined the Northern Territory Special Reconnaissance Unit despite being 'over-age' and considered to be medically unfit. This unit, commanded by Thomson, was an irregular warfare unit that patrolled the coast of Arnhem Land. Within this unit he was placed in charge of the Aroetta between 1941 - 1943. During this period he was also twice placed in charge of an outpost at Caledon Bay, became an expert Vickers gunner and was promoted to being acting sergeant.

In late 1943 Gagai was seconded to the 11th Brigade (Australia) where he took part in an expedition to New Guinea, alongside six other Torres Strait Islander soldiers, where he was cut with a machete on the neck. Of this period of service Thomson stated:

I well remember the quiet, steadfast courage of Sergeant Kapiu . . . [who] was a first-class waterman. He was strong and he had no nerves. He could work and when the tension was over he could sleep like a log. He did not fret and worry and waste nervous energy . . . He was powerful—massive is a better word—impassive; even stolid. But he could laugh—a laugh halfway between the angels and Rabelais.

— Donald Thomson, War-Time Exploration in Dutch New Guinea, The Geographical Journal, March 1953

He recovered from his injuries at Merauke and then returned to Australia where he continued to serve, until he was discharged on 28 March 1946. During his wartime service Gagai, as a Torres Strait Islander man, did not receive the same pay of benefits received by his 'white counterparts'.

Gagai died on 21 August 1946 a few months after his return.

== Legacy ==
In 1993 Gagai was featured in an exhibition held at the Australian War Memorial called "Too dark for the light horse" which was designed to draw attention to the service of Aboriginal and Torres Strait Islander people who served in World War II.

== Collections ==
Several photographs and other documentation about Gagai sit within the Donald Thomson Collection at Museums Victoria.
