= Berndt Museum of Anthropology =

Anthropology museum in Western Australia

Coordinates: 31°58′37″S 115°48′58″E

The Berndt Museum is an anthropological museum in Perth, Western Australia, founded in 1976 by Ronald Berndt and Catherine Berndt. It is currently, as of 2025, located with the Lawrence Wilson Art Gallery on the western side of the University of Western Australia (UWA) Crawley campus.

Housing 12,000 objects and 35,000 photographs, the museum contains one of the finest collections of Indigenous Australian art and cultural artifacts in the world, according to the Collections Australia Network. The collection consists of contemporary and historical Aboriginal Australian material culture from regions such as Arnhem Land, the Kimberley, Pilbara, the South West and the Western Desert. The museum also houses substantial Asian and Papua New Guinean collections.

== History ==
The Berndt Museum at the University of Western Australia holds one of Australia's finest and most significant collections of Aboriginal cultural material and knowledge, encompassing art, objects, archives, film, sound, and photographs. The significance of the collection is renowned nationally and internationally. Still, its strength lies most in the inherent value to Aboriginal people and communities of origin and creation. The diversity of regions represented in the Berndt Museum holdings extends beyond Australia to Melanesia and southeast Asia; reaching as far as China, India, Japan, and Egypt, firmly locating the University of Western Australia and the state of Western Australia within the Asia-Pacific region.

The museum was founded by Ronald and Catherine Berndt, who came to Perth in 1956 to develop teaching and research in anthropology at UWA, bringing with them an extensive collection of material acquired during their field work in various areas of Australia and Papua New Guinea. This original collection was formally gifted to the university which, in 1976, established the Anthropology Research Museum to house it and several other collections transferred from University of Western Australia's Anthropology department. The museum's official launch and exhibits opened on 22 February 1979, showcasing collections from northeast and western Arnhem Land, the Kimberley, southwest South Australia, central Western Australia and the Western Desert.

In 1992, two years after Berndt's death, the Anthropology Research Museum was renamed the Berndt Museum of Anthropology in honour of both the Berndt's contributions to the university, the field of anthropology and the museum. Catherine's death in 1994 resulted in another generous bequest to the university and the museum. It contained the remainder of their private collections, including a significant Asian collection, their field notebooks (which were held under embargo until 2024) and their personal archive of manuscripts, personal and professional papers.

== Collections ==
The Berndt Museum holds a range of nationally significant collections. This includes more than 11,500 items, 35,000 photographs, film, and sound, as well as multiple archives, and is considered one of the most significant collections of Aboriginal and Torres Strait Islander art and cultural material globally. The collections include Asian and Melanesian materials, as well as representations from around the world, broadening its international appeal.

=== History ===
The museum's history spans over 60 years of collecting, with well over 100 years of historical and contemporary material that has been continuously supported, and with ongoing additions to existing donations made by researchers locally, nationally, and internationally. The museum collections provide a means of encouraging the exchange of knowledge and igniting much-needed dialogue regarding culture, place, politics, law, identity and heritage.

=== Yirrkala Drawing Collection – UNESCO Memory of the World Register ===
The Yirrkala Drawings were first collected and documented by renowned anthropologists, Catherine and Ronald Berndt. Catherine and Ronald worked with the Yolngu Community in 1946 and 1947, and when it was believed that bark paintings with original designs would not survive local conditions and travel from a remote wetland setting to an urban one, rolls of brown paper and packets of crayons were called on to execute the designs in another medium. Yolngu from several clan groups were involved in creating the coloured crayon on brown paper drawings, many of which were inspired by land-based and interrelated designs evident on traditional bark paintings. The drawings produced by significant artists such as Mawalan and Wandjuk Marika, Munggurrawuy Yunupingu, Narritjin Maymuru and Wonggu Mununggurr are among the 365 works currently held in the Berndt Museum's Collection. In 2009, the Yirrkala Drawings Collection was successfully nominated for inclusion on UNESCO's Memory of the World Australian Register.

=== Photographic ===
The Berndt Photographic Material Collection (BPMC) comprises negatives in various formats and digital images, which are diverse in terms of provenance and subject matter. Although a significant number of researchers and academics utilise the photographic material, this collection is of particular importance to Aboriginal community members as a visual point of reference for making connections to family, place, and culture.

==== Returning Photos Project ====
The Berndt Museum acted as a point of contact for public requests for access to the photographic material compiled by the 'Returning Photos: Australian Aboriginal Photographs in European Collections' project. The project, funded by the Australian Research Council under its Discovery scheme (DP110100278), collated and presents information about historical photographs of Australian Aboriginal people held in four European museums: the University of Oxford's Pitt Rivers Museum, the Cambridge University Museum of Archaeology and Anthropology, the Musée du Quai Branly in Paris, and the Nationaal Museum van Wereldculturen (National Museum of World Cultures) in Leiden.

=== Archives ===
The Berndt Museum Archive comprises several discrete collections that document Australian Aboriginal knowledge, law, and culture, as well as socio-economic and political life, histories, and interactions.

The Ronald M and Catherine H Berndt Field Notebooks and Personal Archive were subject to a 30-year embargo that lifted in 2024.

== Exhibitions ==
The Berndt Museum hosts two major exhibitions annually, accompanied by associated public events. The changing program of exhibitions takes place throughout the academic year and is held in the Janet Holmes à Court Gallery within the Lawrence Wilson Art Gallery.

=== Major exhibition listing ===
- Out of the boxes and into the Desert. 13 July – 7 December 2019 – Out of the boxes and into the Desert explores the Berndt Museum's collection of paintings from the Central Desert. Following a recent storage project, the Berndt Museum aims to provide access to artworks that have been inaccessible for decades.
- Carrolup Revisited: A Journey through the South West of Western Australia. 9 February – 29 June 2019 – Carrolup Revisited: A Journey through the South West of Western Australia celebrates the artists well known for their role in the Carrolup School of Art.
- Stockyards and Saddles: A story of Gibb River Station. 21 July – 8 December 2018 – Stockyards and Saddles: A Story of Gibb River Station explores the lives of those living and working on the remote cattle station of Gibb River in the East Kimberley region from the early 1900s until the 1990s.
- In Light of Shadows. 10 February – 7 July 2018 – Focusing on the Berndt Museum's Asian Collection, In Light of Shadows encourages audiences to question the meaning of light and/or darkness in relation to other cultures and within themselves.
- Milingimbi: A Living Culture. 28 July – 16 December 2017 – The Berndt Museum, along with the Milingimbi Aboriginal Art and Cultural Centre and the Janet Holmes à Court Collection, present a selection of works from Milingimbi Island in north-east Arnhem Land, Northern Territory.
- Works of Art from Warburton. 11 February – 1 July 2017 – The Berndt Museum and Warburton Arts Project bring to Perth a selection of works from the Ngaanyatjarra community's own collection.

== Related publications ==
- Friends of the Berndt Museum of Anthropology (1993). Newsletter University of Western Australia, Friends of the Berndt Museum of Anthropology, Nedlands, W.A
- Berndt Museum of Anthropology 1997, Berndt news: newsletter of the Berndt Museum of Anthropology, University of Western Australia, Berndt Museum of Anthropology, Nedlands, W.A
- Berndt Museum of Anthropology (1997), Berndt news : newsletter of the Berndt Museum of Anthropology, University of Western Australia, Berndt Museum of Anthropology, ISSN 1329-3117
