= Ted Strehlow =

Australian anthropologist and linguist (1908–1978)

Theodor George Henry Strehlow (6 June 1908 – 3 October 1978) was an Australian anthropologist and linguist. The son of pastor Carl Strehlow, he studied the Arrernte people and their language in Central Australia.

== Early life and education ==
Theodor George Henry Strehlow was born on 6 June 1908 on the Hermannsburg Mission in the Northern Territory. His father was Carl Strehlow, Lutheran pastor and Superintendent, since 1896, of the Hermannsburg Mission, southwest of Alice Springs on the Finke River. (Note: This had large implications, since it meant for the local people that he belonged to the Ratapa in the Twin Spirit Boys myth. Coincidentally, he was born in the sign of Gemini, and 'doubleness' was to haunt his life.) His mother was Friedericke Johanna Henriette (née Keysser).

He was raised trilingually, speaking, in addition to English, also Arrernte with the Aboriginal maids and native children, and German with his immediate family. After a family visit to Germany when he was three years old (1911), he returned with his parents, and grew up parted from his four elder brothers and a sister, Frederick, Karl, Rudolf, Hermann and Martha, who were raised in Germany. He studied both Latin and Greek as part of his home school curriculum.

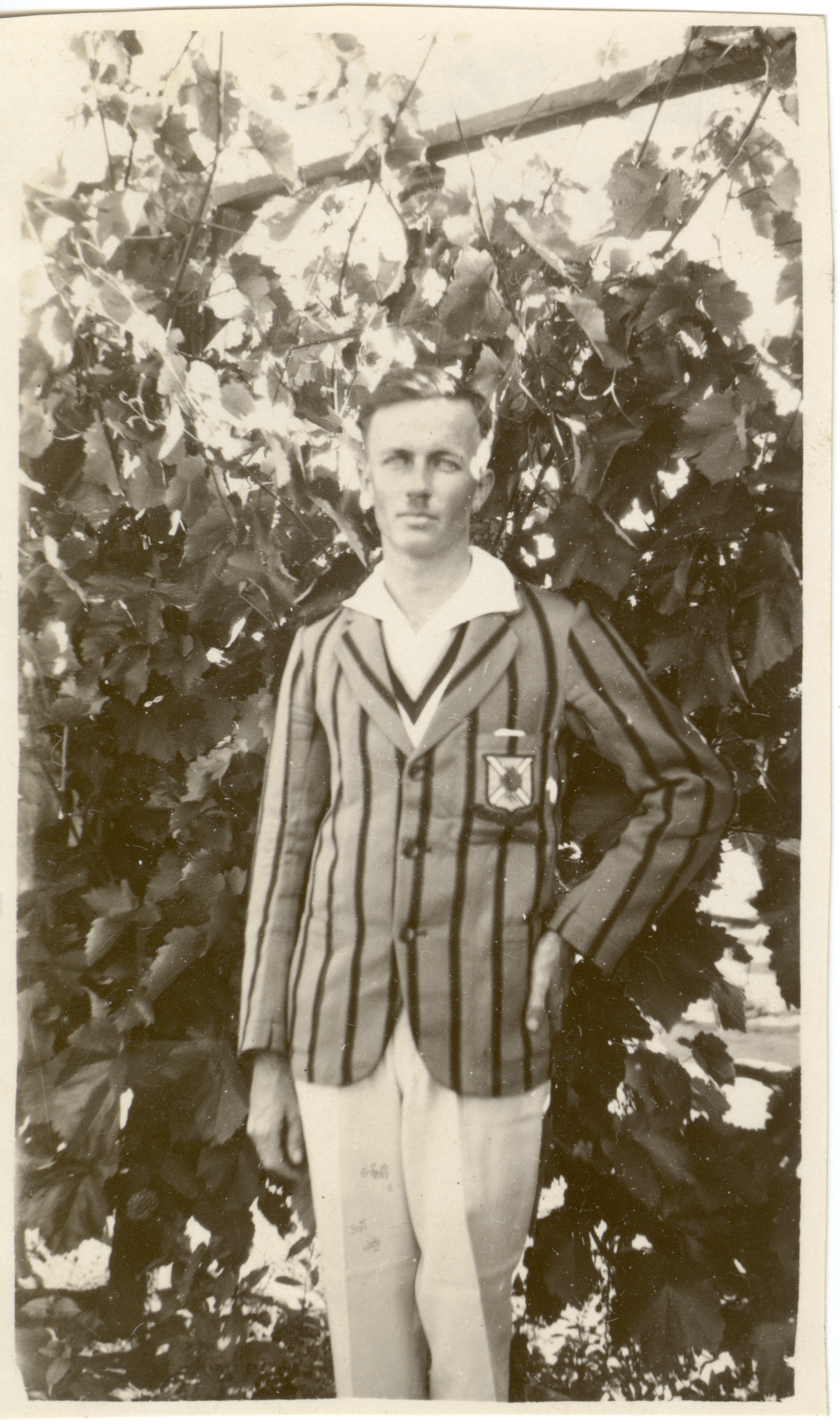
Ted Strehlow in the 1930s

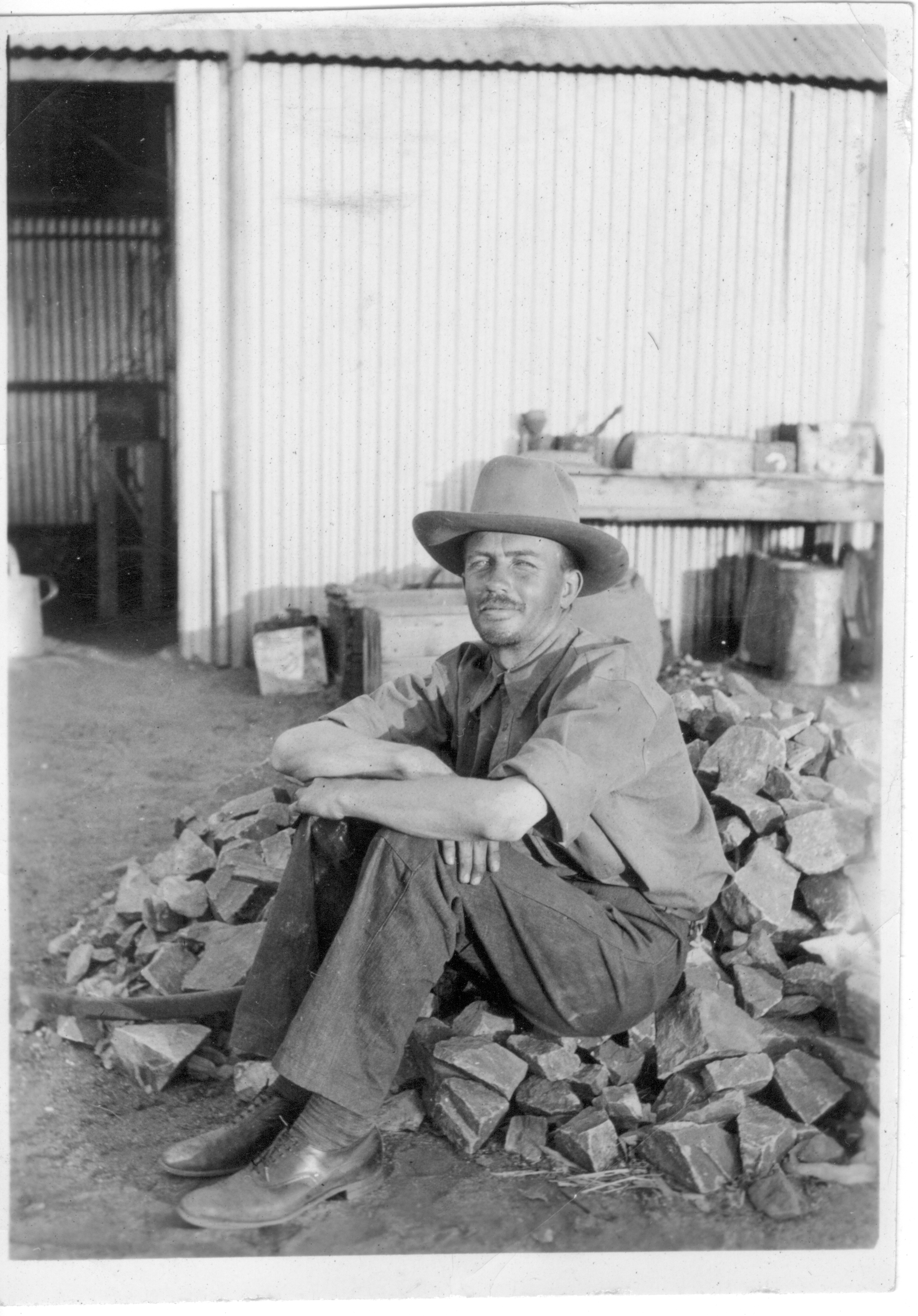
Strehlow following one of his patrols, c.1930s

When Strehlow was 14 years of age his domineering and charismatic father contracted dropsy and the story of the transport of his dying father to a station where medical help was available was recalled in Strehlow's book Journey to Horseshoe Bend. The tragic death of his father marked Strehlow for life. He left Hermannsburg for secondary schooling at Immanuel College, a boarding school for country boys of German stock, in Adelaide. He was top of the state in Latin, Greek, and German in his final year Leaving Certificate examinations in 1926, and thus won a government bursary to study at the University of Adelaide.

At university Strehlow eventually enrolled in a joint honours course in Classics and English, graduating in 1931 with Honours in both. (Note: There is a contradiction in the source, since Hill earlier cites a source that has it that: 'His brilliance aside, the pressure of work forced him to relinquish the Honours Classics course to concentrate on English.')

== Career ==
With support from his tutor, and from both A. P. Elkin and Norman Tindale, Strehlow received a research grant from the Australian National Research Council to study Arrernte culture, and to that purpose returned to his home in Central Australia which was stricken by four years of drought and disease that had carried off many people, and emptied the land of wildlife. The tribes of Central Australia had already become the object of worldwide interest through the joint work of exploration and ethnographic enquiry undertaken by Baldwin Spencer and Frank Gillen, whose researches exercised a notable impact on both sociological and anthropological theory, in the works of Émile Durkheim and James G. Frazer, and on psychoanalysis, in the thesis proposed by Sigmund Freud in his Totem and Taboo. One of Freud's disciples, Géza Róheim, had actually conducted fieldwork while based in Hermannsburg among the Arrernte in 1929.

His first major informants, old and fully initiated men, were Gurra, from the northern Arrernte, and Njitia and Makarinja from Horseshoe Bend, later to be joined by Rauwiraka, Makarinja, Kolbarinja, Utnadata and Namatjira, the father of the famous painter of that name. Mickey Gurra (Tjentermana), his earliest informant and last of the ingkata or ceremonial chiefs (Note: Ward McNally in defining ingkata as 'Ceremonial Chief of Ceremonial Festivals' is actually referring to the more extended title, Urumbulak ingkata, which Strehlow says was conferred on him by the elders who were entrusting their full lore to him.) of the bandicoot totem centre known as Ilbalintja, confided in Strehlow in May 1933 that neither he nor any of the other old men had sons or grandsons responsible enough to be trusted with the secrets of their sacred objects (tjurunga) (many of which were being sold for food and tobacco as the native culture broke down), together with the accompanying chants and ceremonies. They were worried that all their secrets would die with them. Several, such as Rauwiraka, confided to Strehlow their secret knowledge, and even their names, trusting him to conserve the details of all their sacred lore and rites. He was considered a member of the Arrernte people, by dint of his ritual adoption by the tribe.

In the following two years, covering more than 7,000 gruelling miles of desert to witness and record Aboriginal ways, Strehlow witnessed and recorded some 166 sacred ceremonies dealing with totemic acts, most of which are no longer practised. His academic stature firmed with the publication of Aranda Traditions (1947). This work had been assembled in 1934 but Strehlow delayed publication until all his informants were dead.

=== Travel and academia ===
Soon after, in 1949, Strehlow received an Australian National University fellowship, which, though, as he soon found out, carried with it no prospect for an academic career in Canberra, enabled him to complete further studies in the field, and travel to England for research. His sojourn left him disappointed, both with England, and with many of its leading anthropologists, such as Raymond Firth and J. R. Firth, who in his view failed to extend to him the support and interest his research required, since they were critical of his lack of formal anthropological credentials. He toured the continent and lectured, with considerable success, in France and Germany, and met up with his siblings and mother in Bavaria.

He gained recognition for the linguistic work which his father had begun. After the war, in 1946, he was appointed lecturer in English and linguistics, and then Reader in Linguistics at the University of Adelaide in 1954, becoming a full professor when awarded a personal chair in linguistics in 1970.

In 1964, Strehlow was a founding member of the Australian Institute of Aboriginal Affairs, but resigned in 1973.

He was a Foundation Fellow of the Australian Academy of the Humanities in 1969.

In 1978 Strehlow received an honorary doctorate from the Faculty of Humanities at Uppsala University, Sweden.

=== Max Stuart case ===
In 1958 a nine-year-old girl, Mary Hattam, was found raped and murdered on the beach at Ceduna. The police subsequently arrested an Aboriginal man, Rupert Max Stuart, for the crime. Stuart was convicted and condemned to death in late April 1959. The case quickly assumed the character of a cause célèbre as civil rights groups questioned the evidence based solely on a confession made to the police which the prosecution and officers affirmed had been taken down word for word. The verdict was appealed, went to the High Court and the Privy Council in London and concluded with a review by a Royal Commission.

Strehlow's involvement came after a Catholic priest who was convinced of Stuart's innocence asked him for an informed judgement on the language of the evidence by which the Aborigine had been convicted. Strehlow, it turned out, had known during his days as a patrol officer at Jay Creek both Stuart's grandfather, Tom Ljonga, and Stuart himself. Ljonga had been his trusted companion through many long journeys through the Central Australian deserts. Four days before the appointed hanging, Strehlow, with the Catholic chaplain, interviewed Stuart at Yatala prison. In the subsequent review process, Strehlow testified several times on what he saw as the incompatibility between the English of the confession and the dialect vernacular Stuart used. Familiar with white men in the Centre who had raped Aboriginal girls of that age, Strehlow did not think this crime fitted with Aboriginal behaviour. Stuart's conviction was upheld, but he escaped the death penalty.

=== Later career ===
In November 1971, after many years of difficulty due also to the special fonts required to reproduce his text, he published Songs of Central Australia, a monumental study of the ceremonial poetry of the Arrernte tribes. Although reviewed with condescending hostility in the Times Literary Supplement, it was acclaimed by Australian experts like A. P. Elkin as one of the three most significant books ever published on Australian anthropology.

The last three decades of his life were intermittently troubled by the question of the ownership and custodianship on the objects, and records on the Aboriginal people which he had accumulated during his fieldwork over a long career. The government and two universities, who had subsidised his labours, and, towards the end, a younger generation of Aranda people on the Land Rights Council, believed they were the proper bodies for taking over the care and housing of this extensive material. Strehlow felt a personal responsibility for this material, as the man exclusively entrusted by a generation of elders with myths and songs, their secret knowledge and ceremonial artifacts, and held a grievance for what he considered to be the shabby treatment he had received during his life by the establishment. He set difficult and exacting conditions through many negotiations, and when the issue came to a head, determined to will his private collection to his new family, who would house and conserve it in their own home. Strehlow justified his retention of these objects by the personal expense he had laid out, and by the fact, he insisted, that they had been formally handed into his care by 'surrender ceremonies'.

In an apparent paradox, once the Lutheran mission at Hermannsburg had sufficient confidence in the Christianised native community to accord them autonomy, and yield church leases on the area to their Aboriginal congregation, many local natives moved out, claimed their tjurunga rights to the land, and began to re-celebrate the older ceremonies. In his final return to the area, he was surprised to discover that his "twin", Gustav Malbunka, who had once saved his life, and who had not only renounced his culture but become an evangelical preacher, was capable of singing tjilpa (totemic quoll) verses that once formed a key part of rituals that Strehlow thought were extinct. The culture, even among Christian converts, had been secretly passed on.

== Personal life ==
Strehlow married twice, first to teacher Bertha Gwendoline Alexandra James, in Prospect, Adelaide, on 21 December 1935, with whom he had three children after at least one miscarriage; a daughter and two sons.

In 1968 he left Bertha and began living with his 36-year-old research assistant and ardent supporter, Kathleen Stuart (née Anderson). After his marriage to Bertha had been dissolved on 6 September 1972, he married Kathleen on 25 September 1972. She had earlier changed her surname by deed poll to Strehlow.

== Death and legacy ==
Strehlow died of hypertensive coronary artery disease on 3 October 1978, just before the opening of an exhibition of his collection of artefacts, while conversing with Justice Kirby and his friend and colleague Ronald Berndt on the extinction of the bilby (the key animal in the bandicoot ritual) by introduced rabbits, a metaphor for what was happening to the Aboriginal people and their culture with the spread of white civilisation. He was cremated. His career and his role as the custodian of Aboriginal secrets have been dogged by controversy.

A decade later, negotiations between his widow and the Northern Territory government led to the finalisation of the purchase of most of the collection in 1987. It was described by John Morton as containing "some 700 objects (largely secret-sacred), 15 kilometres of movie film, 7,000 slides, thousands of pages of genealogical records, myths, sound recordings [and] 42 diaries", as well as "paintings, letters, maps [and] "a 1,000-volume library".

The Strehlow Research Centre at Alice Springs was established for the preservation and public display of these works. The collection is often accessed by Arrernte people as well as other Central Australian Aboriginal groups. Contemporary anthropologist Jason Gibson has shown how Strehlow's collection is actively used and interpreted by descendent Arrernte and Anmatyerr communities. He has also recorded how Strehlow is remembered and respected by some senior men as a "ceremony man" while others feel betrayed by his use of their ceremonial material.

== In the arts ==
Journey to Horseshoe Bend was turned into a cantata of the same name by Gordon Williams and Andrew Schulz, and premiered in the Sydney Opera House in May 2003, performed by the Hermannsburg Ladies Choir and starring Aaron Pedersen. It was commissioned by Symphony Australia for performance by Sydney Symphony Orchestra, funded by the Australia Council.

The first half of a double biography of Strehlow and his wife Frieda, The Tale of Frieda Keysser, based in large part on Frieda's diaries from the period, was published by grandson John Strehlow in 2012, with the second volume published in 2019.

Stephen Orr's 2026 novel The Night Parrots is based on Journey to Horseshoe Bend. According to the author, the novel is primarily "the story of a father and a son".

== Bibliography ==
- Aranda Phonetics and Grammar, with introduction by Professor A.P. Elkin (Australian National Research Council, [1944])
- Aranda Traditions (1947)
- An Australian Viewpoint (Printed for the author by Hawthorn Press, 1950)
- Rex Battarbee (Sydney: Legend, [1956])
- Friendship with South-East Asia: a Cultural Approach (Riall Bros., Printers, 1956)
- Nomads in No-man's-land (Aborigines Advancement League of South Australia, 1961)
- Dark and White Australians (Aborigines Advancement League of South Australia, 1964)
- Assimilation Problems: the Aboriginal Viewpoint (Aborigines Advancement League Inc. of South Australia, 1964)
- The Sustaining Ideals of Australian Aboriginal Societies (Aborigines Advancement League Inc. of South Australia, 1966, originally published: Melbourne: Hawthorn Press, 1956)
- Comments on the Journals of John McDouall Stuart (Libraries Board of South Australia, 1967)
- Journey to Horseshoe Bend (1969)
- Songs of Central Australia (Sydney: Angus and Robertson, 1971)
- Central Australian Religion (Australian Association for the Study of Religions, 1978)
