= Frieda Strehlow =

German missionary to Australia

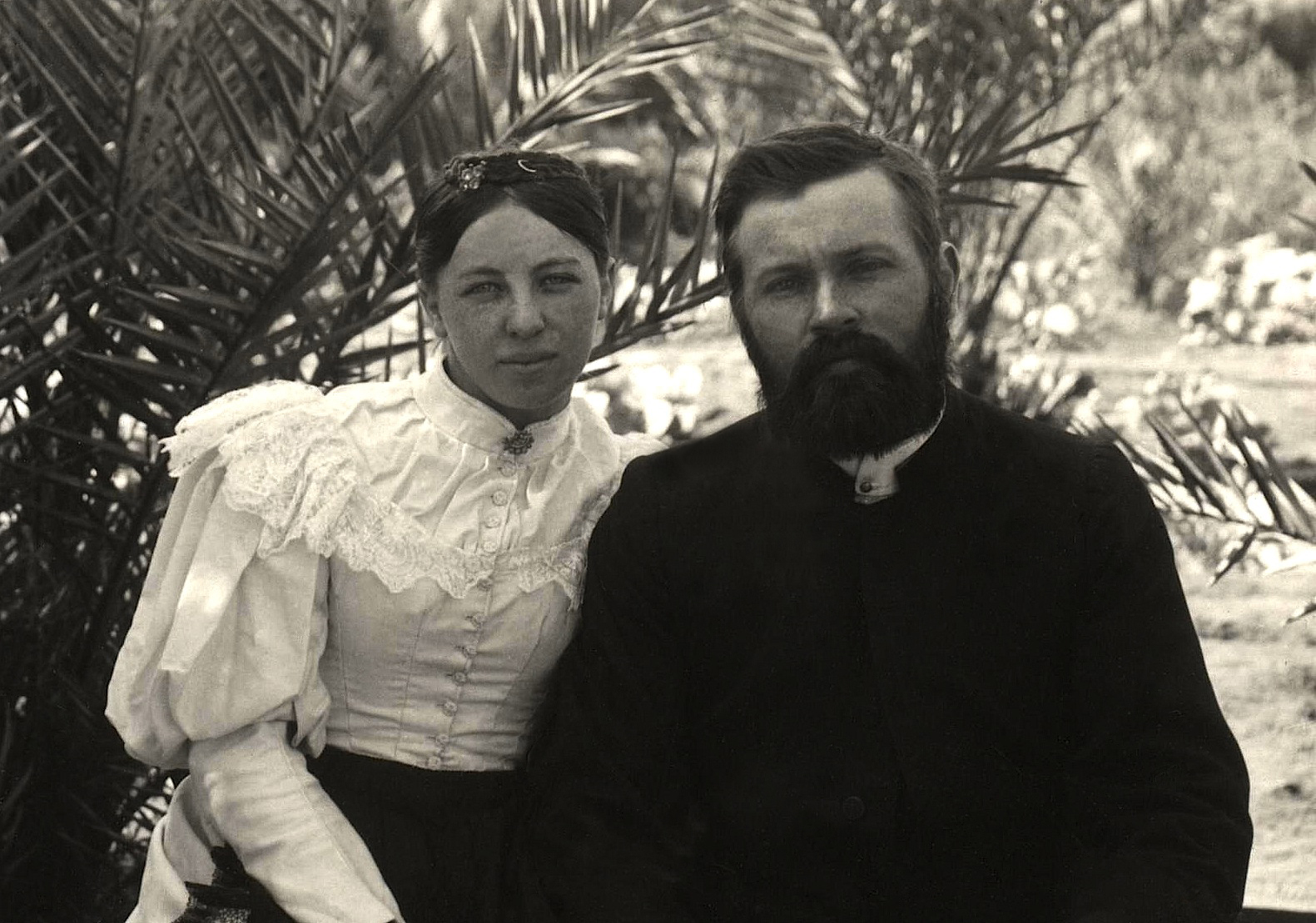
Frieda and Carl Strehlow

Friederike Johanna Henriette Strehlow née Keysser (31 August 1875 – 30 April 1957) better known as Frieda Strehlow, was a German missionary who lived and worked at Hermannsburg in the Northern Territory of Australia in the early 1900s. She was best known for overcoming the high rate of infant mortality for Aboriginal children.

== Early life ==
Strehlow was born in Geroldsgruen, the daughter of wood factory owner C.T. Keysser, living there until he died in 1879. She then lived partly with her mother and step-father and with her mother's sister Augusta and her grandparents in Theilenhofen and later Gunzenhausen. Her grandfather was the Lutheran pastor at Theilenhofen, Johann Erhard Fischer, who was a co-founder with Wilhelm Löhe of the Society for Inner Mission in Neuendettelsau in 1850. Her grandmother, Sophia Elisa Marianna (Omeis) Fischer, was also the daughter of a Lutheran pastor.

She studied at Löhe's Industry School in Neuendettelsau in 1890 and fell in love with Carl Strehlow in 1892 when he was on his way to Killalpaninna Mission (also known as Bethesda) in South Australia. It is said that they fell in love just 36 hours after meeting. Despite opposition from her family the relationship blossomed, conducted by letter. She came to Australia and on 25 September 1895 she and Carl were married at Point Pass in South Australia. They arrived in Hermannsburg on 5 November after a challenging journey on the mail buggy from Oodnadatta, twice running out of water.

== Life in the Northern Territory ==
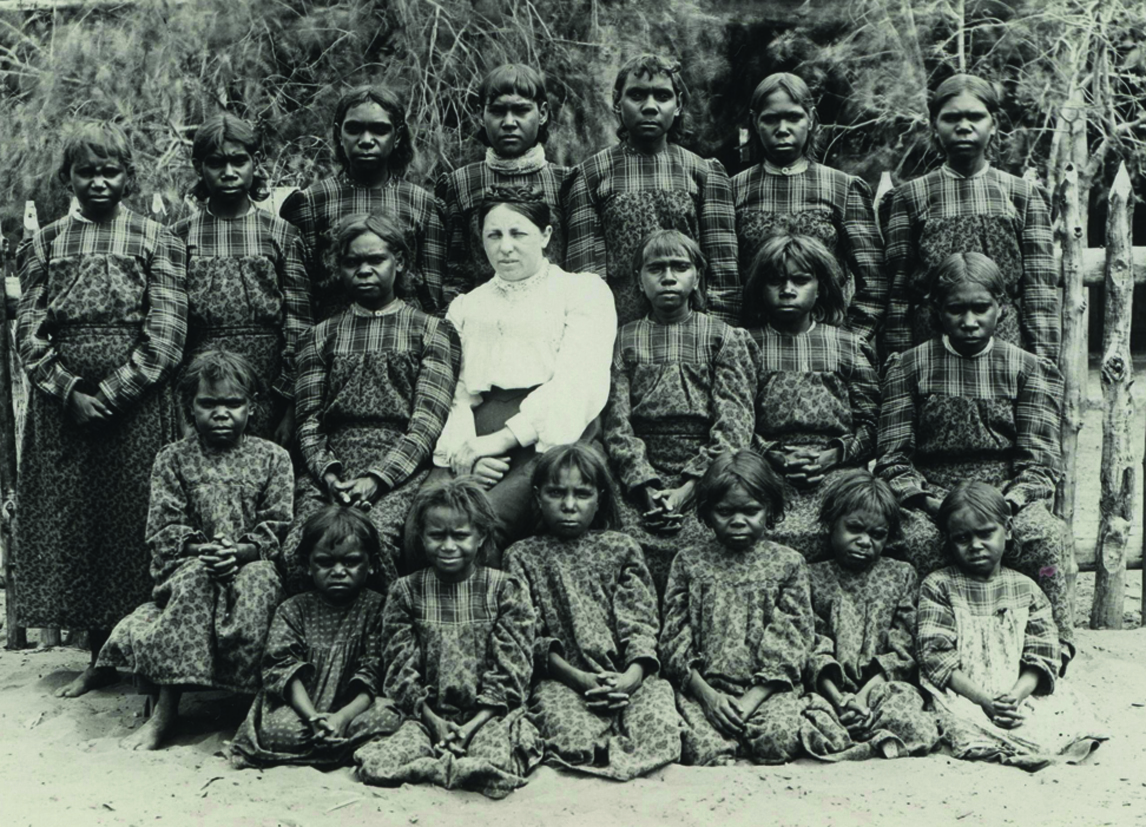
Frieda Strehlow and her sewing class at Hermannsburg Mission in 1907.

Strehlow had six children at Hermannsburg between 1897 and 1908, during which time the mission buildings were renovated or replaced by new structures. Being a cattle station in a remote area, life was difficult, especially during the droughts, with many privations as regards food and supplies. There were no doctors, so each child's birth took place without trained medical help, twice with Carl acting as midwife. Frieda suffered greatly from toothache.

Strehlow devoted herself to the younger generation of girls, teaching them basic health practices, how to sew, how to cook and above all how to bring up healthy children in the changed circumstances they were living in. For several years she was the only white woman at Hermannsburg. She learned Aranda fluently and translated several hymns. Due to her psychological isolation, she maintained an enormous correspondence with female friends in Australia and Germany, as well as with her brother Christian Keysser in New Guinea. This is now in the Strehlow Research Centre in Alice Springs.

Frieda also kept comprehensive diaries of her time in Central Australia, which offer a unique record of life on the frontier. These were used by her grandson, John Strehlow, to write The Tale of Frieda Keysser: Frieda Keysser and Carl Strehlow, An Historical Biography, Volume I: 1875–1910.

== Later life ==
Apart from a year's holiday in 1903 and a visit to Germany in 1910 to place the Strehlow children in German schools, Frieda and Carl spent their entire time together in Australia at Hermannsburg. When Carl's health made it necessary to go south in October 1922, they travelled with their youngest son Theo by horse and buggy to Horseshoe Bend where Carl died, leaving her without any means of support.

She became matron at Immanuel College in Adelaide until 1931 to support Theo through his education, returning to Germany later that year. During the 1920s she stayed in touch with the Aranda at Hermannsburg, corresponding by letter. Fleeing with millions of others from Silesia before the Red Army advance at the end of World War II, she died in Neuendettelsau in 1957, where she was buried.
