= Ursula, A Voyage of Love and Drama =

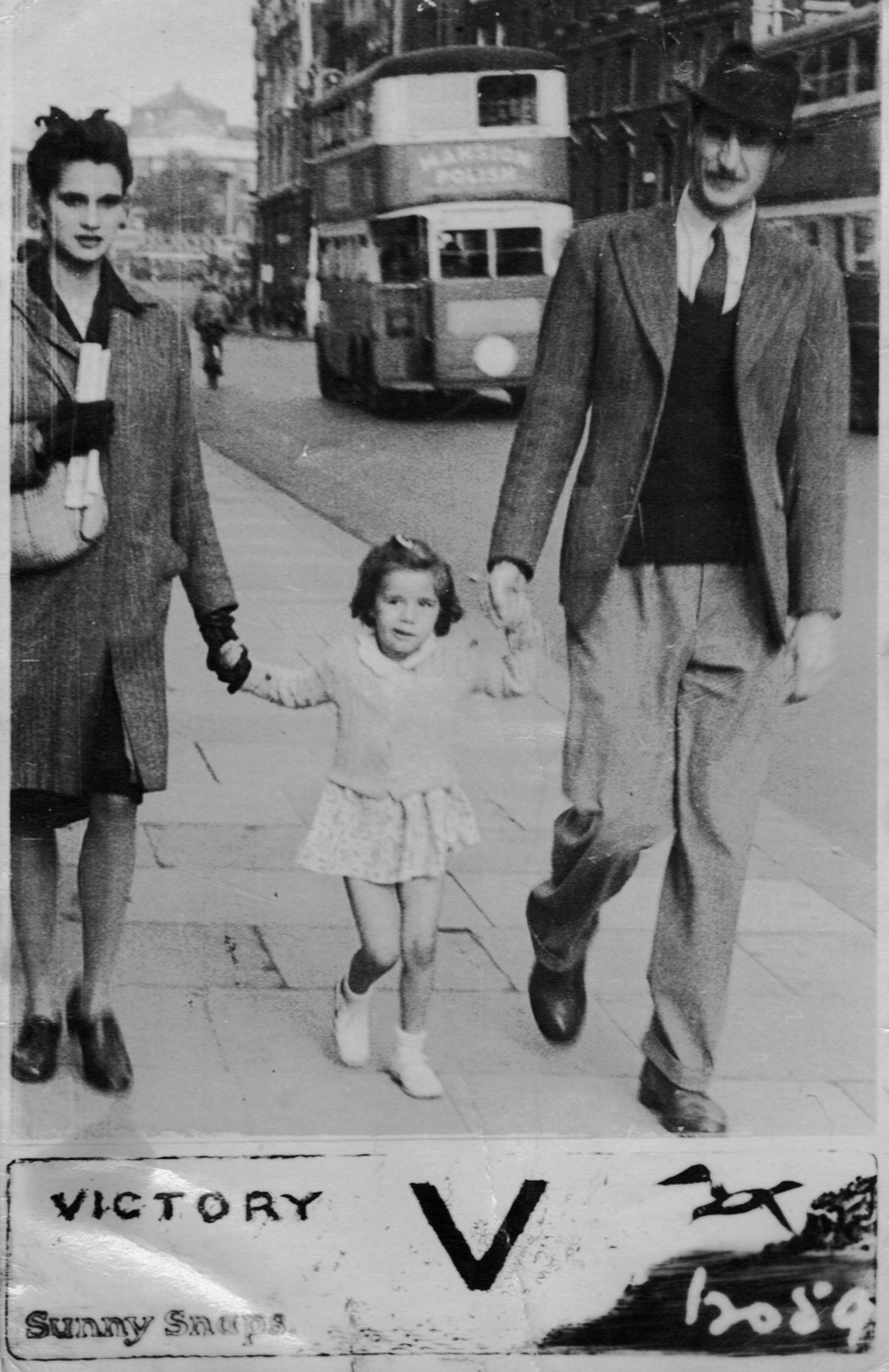
Ursula, Eileen and Nigel in London after WWII

Ursula, A Voyage of Love and Drama is a 2008 biography by Australian author, Eileen Naseby. Naseby wrote about the life of her mother, Ursula. The book tells the story of Ursula and her mother's escape from the Nazi regime, her closeted upbringing in Palestine, her love affair with the adventurer and writer Laurens van der Post, and her eventual emigration to Australia with Eileen and her two children Diana and Charmian to her new husband Nigel.
