= Leni Shilton =

Australian poet

Leni Shilton is a poet, teacher and researcher based in Alice Springs in the Northern Territory of Australia.

== Biography ==
Shilton grew up in Papua New Guinea and Melbourne, Australia. She moved to Alice Springs in 1985 to the region to work as a remote-area nurse and health educator but has since taught creative writing at the Alice Springs Correctional Centre and Batchelor Institute of Indigenous Tertiary Education. She has also worked at NPY Women's Council as an education researcher.

Shilton's poetry has been included in a number of anthologies, journals and broadcast radio and in 2018, she published her first book Walking with camels: the story of Bertha Strehlow through University of Western Australia Publishing, developed from her creative writing PhD, Giving silence its voice: uncovering Bertha Strehlow's voice through poetry. It was a finalist in the Northern Territory History Book Awards.

Shilton's second book, Malcolm : a story in verse, was published in 2019 and it is set in Melbourne's underbelly and centres around Malcolm, a 17 year old boy, with a difficult and violent upbringing.

Shilton is also a founding member of Ptilotus Press, a community publisher in Alice Springs, which is managed by a collective of local writers.

== Awards and honours ==
- Northern Territory Literary Award for poetry, 2010 and 2016
- Northern Territory Literary Award, essay category, 2012.
- 2015, shortlisted, University of Canberra Poetry Prize
