= Theilenhofen =

- Municipality
- Coat of arms

- Location of Theilenhofen within Weißenburg-Gunzenhausen district
- Interactive map of Theilenhofen
- Location within Germany Location within Bavaria
- Coordinates: 49°5′N 10°51′E
- Country: Germany
- State: Bavaria
- Admin. region: Mittelfranken
- District: Weißenburg-Gunzenhausen
- Municipal assoc.: Gunzenhausen
- Subdivisions: 5 Ortsteile

Government
  - Mayor (2020–26): Helmut König

Area
  - Total: 20.32 km^{2} (7.85 sq mi)
- Elevation: 494 m (1,621 ft)

Population (2025-12-31)
  - Total: 1,140
  - Density: 56.1/km^{2} (145/sq mi)
- Time zone: UTC+01:00 (CET)
  - Summer (DST): UTC+02:00 (CEST)
- Postal codes: 91741
- Dialling codes: 09834
- Vehicle registration: WUG
- Website: www.theilenhofen.de

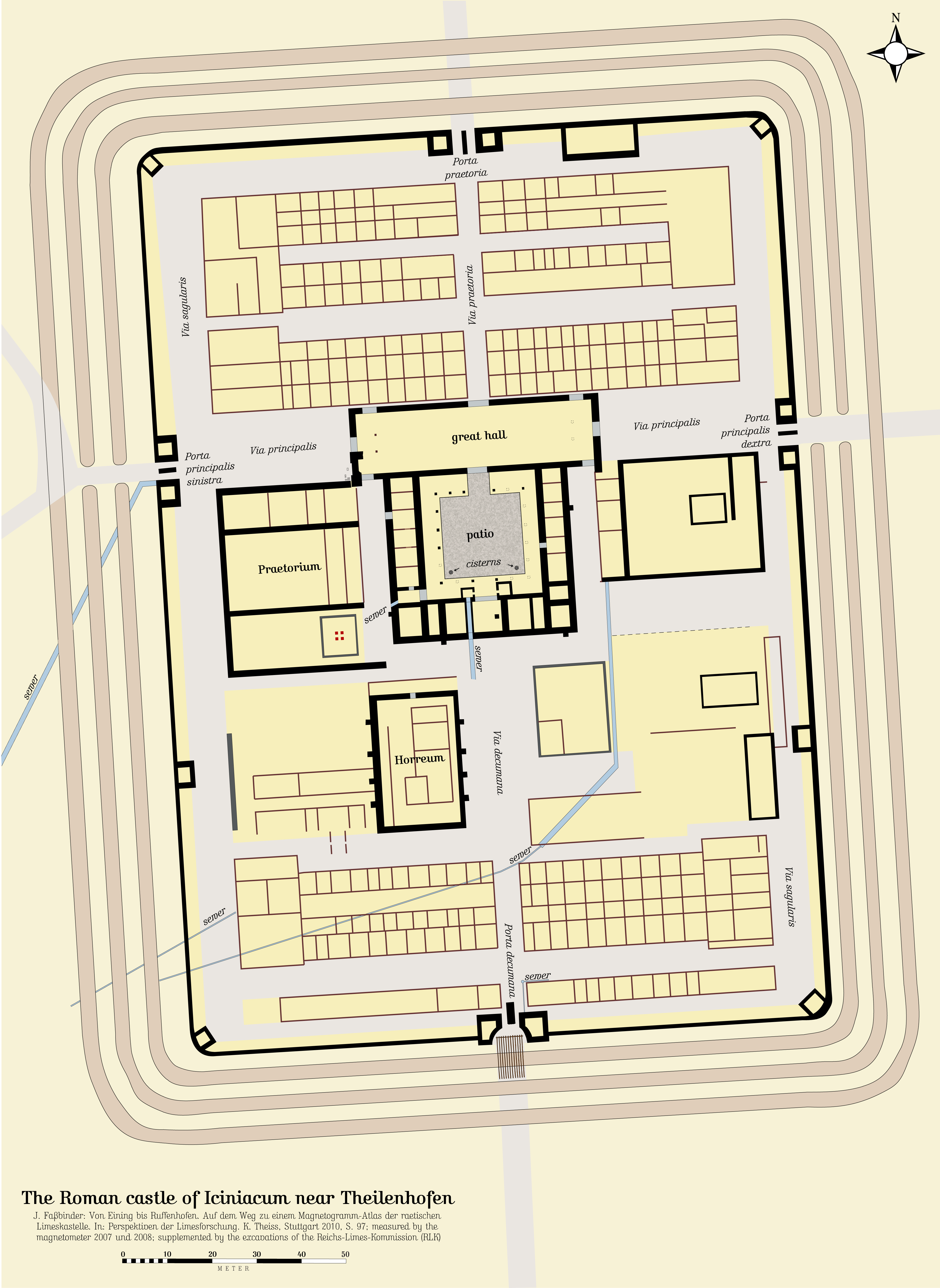
The Roman camp of Iciniacum near Theilenhofen

Theilenhofen is a municipality in the Weißenburg-Gunzenhausen district, in Bavaria, Germany. An important part of the local history is the Roman camp Iciniacum, near the Limes Germanicus. This fortification and Roman village was erected around 100 AD and destroyed c. 260 AD by the Germanic Alemanni. Today you can see only the Roman Military Bath in this area. It was first found in 1820.

== Books about the Roman Camp ==
- Dietwulf Baatz: Der Römische Limes. Archäologische Ausflüge zwischen Rhein und Donau. 4. Auflage, Gebr. Mann, Berlin 2000, ISBN 3-7861-2347-0 (German language)
- Heinrich Eidam: Das Kastell Theilenhofen. At: Ernst Fabricius, Friedrich Hettner, Oscar von Sarwey: Der obergermanisch-raetische Limes des Römerreiches B VII Nr 71a, Petters, Heidelberg, 1905 (German language)
