= Caledon Bay =

Bay in Northern Territory, Australia

Caledon Bay is a bay in Arnhem Land, in the Northern Territory of Australia, at approximately 12.8° S, 136.5° E. It is perhaps most famous as the home of a group of Yolngu people who were key players in the Caledon Bay crisis, which marked a turning point in the relationship between Indigenous and non-Indigenous Australians.

Caledon Bay is also the place where Matthew Flinders recorded on 3 February 1803 an encounter with some Aboriginal people and he described them as "Australians". This is one of the first recorded uses of the word to describe the inhabitants of the Continent. He had used the word in his journal before on 3 March 1802 when he saw 3 or 4 Indigenous people near what is now Port Lincoln.
