= Ronald Berndt =

Australian anthropologist (1916–1990)

Ronald Murray Berndt AM
- Born: Ronald Murray Berndt; 14 July 1916; Adelaide, South Australia
- Died: 2 May 1990 (aged 73); Perth, Western Australia, Australia
- Resting place: Karrakatta Cemetery
- Education: University of Sydney - BA, MA; London School of Economics - PhD
- Occupation: Anthropologist
- Employer: University of Western Australia (1956–81)
- Spouse: Catherine Berndt (m. 1941–1990)

Ronald Murray Berndt AM (14 July 1916 – 2 May 1990) was an Australian social anthropologist who, in 1963, became the inaugural professor of anthropology at the University of Western Australia.

He and his wife Catherine Berndt maintained a close professional partnership for five decades, working among Aboriginal Australians at Ooldea (1941), Northern Territory cattle stations (1944–46) and Balgo (1957–81), and with indigenous peoples of New Guinea (1951–53).

== Early life and education ==
Ronald Murray Berndt was born on 14 July 1916 in Adelaide, South Australia.

He attended high school at Pulteney Grammar School. He graduated from the University of Sydney in 1951 with a Bachelor of Arts, following up with a Master of Arts in 1954. He was awarded a PhD for a thesis based on his anthropological work in New Guinea.

== Career ==
Berndt was an early advocate for legal recognition and protection of Aboriginal sacred sites, and clashed in 1980 with the Liberal premier Sir Charles Court over the Noonkanbah dispute in the Kimberley region. His interest was much broader than any one specific location or event, and he was focused on the national dimensions of the land rights issue.

== Publications ==
Some of his sole authored monographs include Kunapipi (1951), Djanggawul (1952), and Man, land and myth in Northern Australia (1970).

=== Joint works with Catherine Berndt ===
The Berndts jointly wrote a book first in 1952 as The First Australians, which went into three editions—the last being published in 1974. A similar title The World of the First Australians went into five editions.

Their publications were extensive. Their contribution to the 1979 Sesquicentenary of Western Australia was the book Aborigines of the West.

== Recognition and honours ==
The Berndts were jointly awarded the Edgeworth David Medal in 1950, and in the 1987 Australia Day Honours each was appointed a Member of the Order of Australia for "service to anthropology, particularly in relation to the Aboriginal society and culture".

On 23 April 1987, Berndt was presented with an honorary Doctor of Letters degree by one of his former students, Robert Tonkinson, who succeeded him as professor of anthropology at UWA in 1984.

== Death and legacy ==
Berndt died in Perth on 2 May 1990 and is interred at Karrakatta Cemetery.

The collected essays in honour of the Berndts in 1990 showed the breadth of the influence of their teaching and writings, with essays by a wide spectrum of anthropologists of their time, including Claude Levi-Strauss, Raymond Firth, and Robert Tonkinson.

The Berndts were avid collectors, and their collection was bequeathed to the University of Western Australia, becoming known as the Berndt Museum of Anthropology.

== See also ==
- Dzamalag
- David Burrumarra
