= Donald Thomson =

Australian anthropologist and ornithologist (1901–1970)

Donald Thomson, OBE
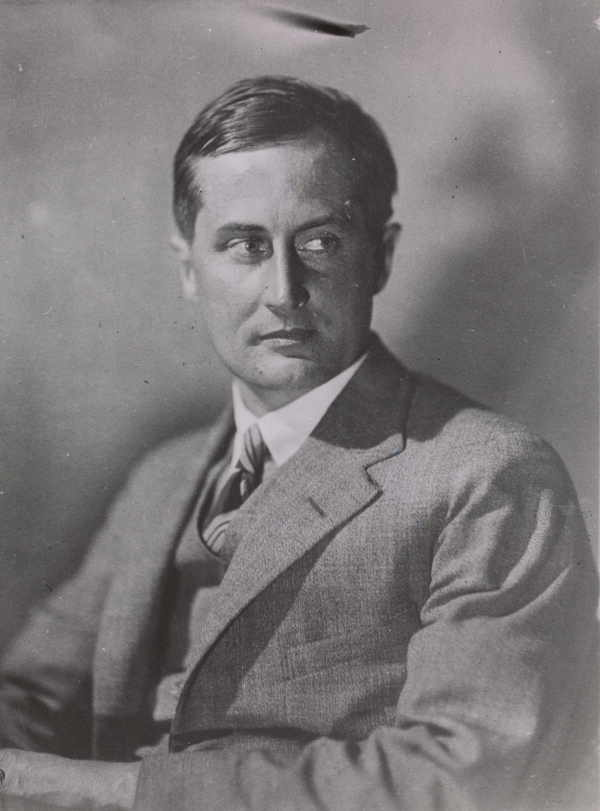
- Donald Thomson
- Born: 26 June 1901; Brighton, Victoria
- Died: 12 May 1970 (aged 68); Melbourne
- Education: University of Melbourne; University of Sydney
- Known for: Ethnographic records made of: i. Wik-Mungknh people ii. Yolngu people iii. Pintupi people
- Scientific career
- Fields: Aboriginal Australian anthropology
- Workplaces: University of Melbourne
- Academic advisors: Alfred Radcliffe-Brown

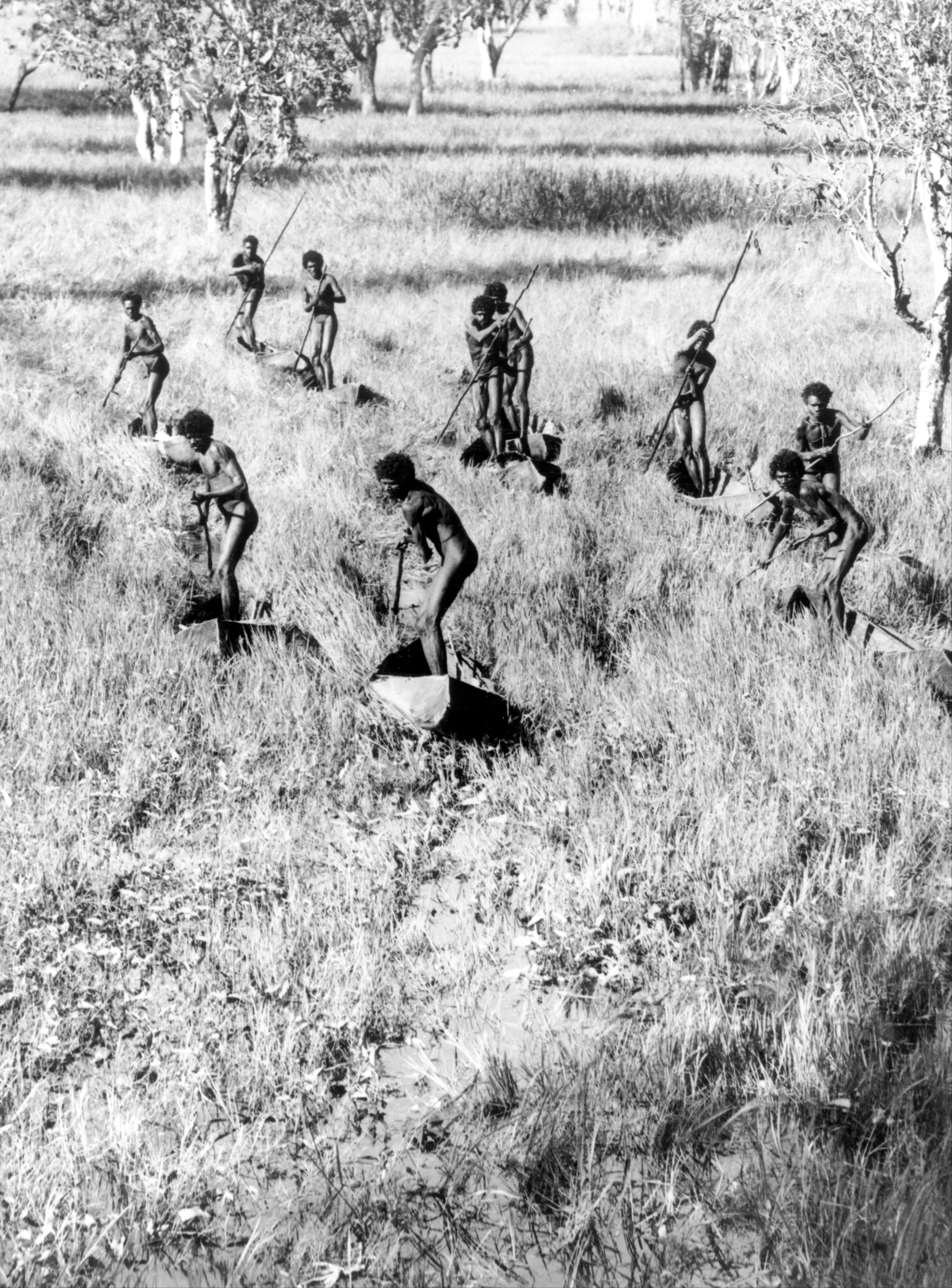
The Goose Hunters of the Arafura Swamp (1937), photo by Donald Thomson, showing Ramingining men on the Arafura Swamp

Donald Finlay Fergusson Thomson OBE (26 June 1901 – 12 May 1970) was an Australian anthropologist and ornithologist. He is known for his studies of and friendship with the Pintupi and Yolngu peoples, and for his intervention in the Caledon Bay crisis.

While Thomson was known to be amicable to First Nations peoples he came in contact with, it has been documented in recent years that he was responsible for the inappropriate removal of human remains from communities.

== Early life and education ==
Donald Finlay Fergusson Thomson was born on 26 June 1901 in the Melbourne suburb of Brighton.

Thomson went to Scotch College, Melbourne, before earning a B.Sc. in zoology and botany at the University of Melbourne in 1925. In 1927 he studied at the University of Sydney, earning a diploma in anthropology in 1928.

While still a school student, he joined the Royal Australasian Ornithologists Union in 1917. He served as press officer in 1923, and then as assistant editor of its journal, Emu from 1924 to 1925.

After two trips to Cape York, Queensland, Thomson joined the Walter and Eliza Hall Institute of Medical Research in Melbourne, and in 1932 joined the University of Melbourne as a research fellow, obtaining his PhD in 1934.

== Career ==
When he graduated in 1925 he joined the Melbourne Herald as a cadet. After earning his diploma in anthropology in 1928, he set off on an eight-month journey, working with and recording the Indigenous people of Cape York. On his return, he was falsely accused of dishonesty, because of the loss of some funds, which was later traced to fraudulent activity by a staff member of the Australian Research Council. This unhappy episode forever damaged his relationship with other anthropologists at Sydney.

Thomson lived at the property of Worlingworth, Eltham from the 1930s. The c.1922 residence and surrounding farm site is considered historically significant and is listed on the Victorian Heritage Databases because of its association with Thomson.

=== Caledon Bay crisis (1932–3) ===
In 1932–33, as the Caledon Bay crisis erupted, Thomson offered his services to the Australian Government to resolve the crisis, and to the surprise of the government succeeded in doing so. His success had long-term ramifications for the relationship between Indigenous and non-Indigenous Australians, and is regarded as the crowning achievement of his life.

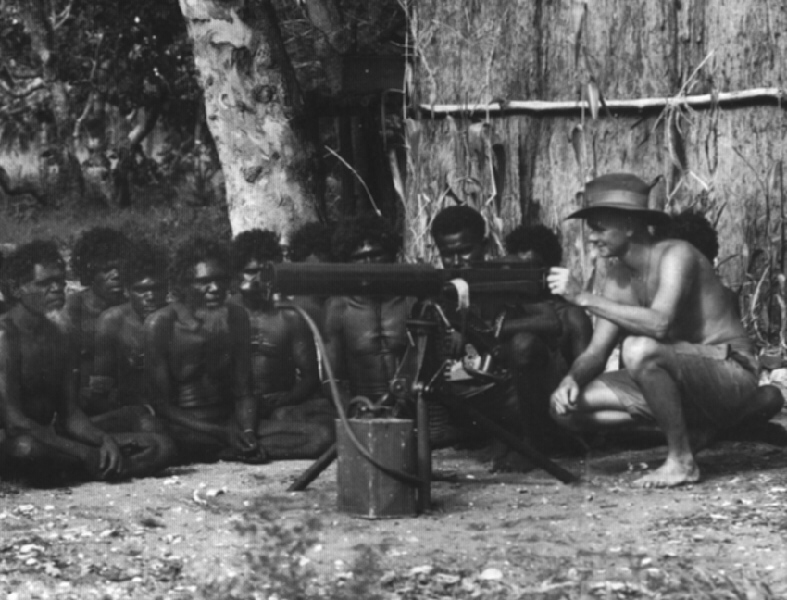
Squadron Leader Donald Thomson training the NTSRU during the Second World War.

He formed a strong bond with the Yolngu people, studying their traditional use of the land in the Arafura Swamp and elsewhere. The story of Thomson's interactions with the northern Arnhem Land Ramingining people is told through the eyes of the Indigenous people in Rolf de Heer's 2009 film Twelve Canoes.

In 1941, he persuaded the Army to establish a special reconnaissance force of Yolngu men known as the Northern Territory Special Reconnaissance Unit, including tribal elder Wonggu and his sons, to help repel Japanese raids on the northern coastline of Australia. In 1943, as the war moved northward from the Australian coast, the unit was disbanded, and Thomson returned to the Air Force. He was badly injured in action in Dutch New Guinea, and spent the rest of the war in hospital before being discharged from the Armed Forces.

=== In central Australia (1957) ===
In 1957, Thomson carried out the "Bindibu (Pintupi) Expedition" to the Western Desert to make contact with Pintupi there. For some Pintupi, this was their first contact with Europeans. They were almost the last Indigenous Australian group with whom white Australians were to make contact (the last being the Richters family in 1986). Thomson again demonstrated his excellent ethnographic skills. The photographs taken here, like those he took in the 1930s in Arnhem Land, have become invaluable historical records for Aboriginal and non-Aboriginal Australians, particularly for the Pintupi. Thomson lived with the Pintupi, and liked them, through much of the 1950s and the 1960s.

== Later life, death and legacy ==
He returned to the University of Melbourne and continued working there until his death on 12 May 1970. His ashes were flown to the Northern Territory and, accompanied in the plane by two of the sons of Wonggu, scattered over the waters of Caledon Bay.

The Thomson Collection, which is currently held by Museums Victoria, includes approximately 4000 black and white glass plate photographs. One of these photographs was of a group of ten men in their bark canoes on a swamp, and was the inspiration for the title of a critically acclaimed film Ten Canoes. The title of the film arose from discussions between co-director Rolf de Heer and the film's narrator, David Gulpilil, about a photograph of ten canoeists poling across the Arafura Swamp, taken by Thomson in 1936.

Thomson is remembered as a friend of the Yolngu people, and as a champion of understanding, by non-Indigenous Australians, of the culture and society of Indigenous Australians. He was largely responsible for turning the Caledon Bay crisis into a "decisive moment in the history of Aboriginal-European relations".

Thomson's story is told in an episode in the 2013 documentary television series Desperate Measures, called "Donald Thomson with Agnes Waramba". As of 2023 the series is available on SBS on Demand.

In 2024, the Donald Thomson Ethnohistory Collection was gifted to the University of Melbourne by his family. It is UNESCO-inscribed.

== Removal of human remains ==
In the first half of the 20th century, likely between 1936 and 1941, Thomson took the remains of nine Yolŋu people from their Country as part of his practice of collecting artefacts from communities he visited. These remains were held at the University of Melbourne.

In July 2026, these remains were repatriated to the Clans which the individuals whose remains were taken belonged to. The University of Melbourne issued a statement written by Marcia Langton which recognised Thomson's wrongdoing in taking the remains and apologised to the Clans to which the individuals belonged. The statement identified these Clans as being the Maḏarrpa, Djapu, Dhuḏi-Djapu, Dhaḷwaŋu, Marrakulu and Maŋgalili.

A formal repatriation ceremony took place at Bäniyala on 30 July 2026. Another ceremony took place at Gäṉgaṉ.

== Personal life ==
Thomson married, first, Gladys Winifred Coleman, on 30 December 1925. They had two sons, before divorcing in 1954.

On 7 May 1955 he married Dorita Maria McColl, a 25-year-old technical assistant.

== List of works ==
- Thomson, D. (1935). Birds of Cape York Peninsula. Ecological notes, field observations, and catalogue of specimens collected on three expeditions to north Queensland. Government Printer, Melbourne.
- Thomson, D.; & Peterson, N. (1983). Donald Thomson in Arnhem Land. Currey O'Neil, South Yarra., ISBN 0-859-02097-5
- Thomson D. (1975). Bindibu Country. Melbourne, Thomas Nelson, ISBN 0-17-005049-1
