= Copyright law of Australia =

The copyright law of Australia defines the legally enforceable rights of creators of creative and artistic works under Australian law. The scope of copyright in Australia is defined in the Copyright Act 1968 (as amended), which applies the national law throughout Australia. Designs may be covered by the Copyright Act (as sculptures or drawings) as well as by the Design Act. Since 2007, performers have moral rights in recordings of their work.

Until 2004, copyright in Australia was based on the plus 50 law, which restricts works until 50 years after the author's death. In 2004 this was changed to a plus 70 law in line with the US and European Union, but this change was not made retroactive (unlike the 1995 change in the European Union which brought some, e.g. British authors, back into copyright). The consequence is that the work of an Australian author who died before 1955 is normally in the public domain in Australia. However the copyright of authors was extended to 70 years after death for those who died in 1955 or later, so that no more Australian authors would come out of copyright until 1 January 2026 (i.e. those who died in 1955).

The Australian legislation is based on the authority of section 51(xviii) of the Australian Constitution. Copyright law in Australia is federal law and established by the Australian Parliament. Historically, Australian copyright law followed British copyright law, but now also reflects international standards found in the Berne Convention for the Protection of Literary and Artistic Works, other international copyright agreements and multilateral treaties, and more recently, the U.S.-Australia Free Trade Agreement.

The Copyright Act 1968 also covers legal deposit, which requires that Australian publishers must lodge copies of their publications in the National Library of Australia and their respective state libraries, depending on location.

== History ==
Australian copyright law has historically been influenced by British copyright law and international copyright agreements. In turn Australian copyright law has influenced copyright law in Britain and the Commonwealth. Australian copyright law originates in British copyright law which was established by the British parliament through the Australian Courts Act 1828 (9 Geo. 4. c. 83 (Imp)). The British Statute of Anne (8 Ann. c. 21 (Imp)) of 1710, which awarded copyright protection to books, acted as a blueprint for the extension of copyright to new types of subject matter in the 18th and 19th Century. When copyright law was introduced into Australia in 1828 British copyright law had been extended beyond literary property to include engravings and sculptures. Over the course of the 19th century it was extended to other works, including paintings, drawings and photographs.

Prior to Australia's federation in 1901, a number of Australian colonies, later states, had enacted copyright laws. In part this was done to mitigate the inadequacy of the protection afforded to Australian authors by British copyright law. The state laws continued to apply after the federal Commonwealth of Australia was established in 1901. The laws operated in concurrency with the British copyright law that was in force in the colonies. The Australian Constitution gives the federal parliament power to make laws relating to copyright and intellectual property, concurrently with the states. Section 51(xviii) of the Commonwealth Constitution provides that "the Parliament shall, subject to this Constitution, have power to make laws for the peace, order, and good government of the Commonwealth with respect to, inter alia, copyright, patents of inventions and designs, and trademarks". As an immediate consequence the power to amend copyright law was no longer held at state level, but by the federal parliament.

The first Australian copyright statute enacted at the federal level was the Copyright Act 1905 (No. 25 (Cth)), which was a departure from British copyright law. It allowed administration of existing state copyright law (where not replaced by the act itself) to be transferred to the federal government by proclamation. Australia became part of the British imperial copyright system on 1 July 1912 when the Australian Copyright Act 1912 (No. 20 (Cth)) adopted the British Copyright Act 1911 (1 & 2 Geo. 5. c. 46). The British 1911 act applied throughout the British Empire, including independent countries such as Australia, Canada, New Zealand and South Africa.

The 1911 act made important changes in copyright law and practice. The 1911 act abolished common law copyright in unpublished works, hence completing the process that began with the 1774 House of Lords decision in Donaldson v Beckett, which held that copyright was a creature of statute. The scope of the imperial copyright system (by changes in the UK act) was expanded to include architecture, sound recordings and motion pictures.

=== Copyright Act 1968 ===
The British Copyright Act 1911 continued to apply in Australia until the Australian Copyright Act 1968 (No. 63 (Cth)) came into force on 1 May 1969. The 1968 act was enacted following the collapse of the imperial system after the passage of the British Copyright Act 1956 (4 & 5 Eliz. 2. c. 74), and following recommendations of the Spicer Committee, which had been appointed by the Australian Attorney-General John Spicer in 1958 to review the 1912 act to see what changes were necessary for Australia to ratify the Brussels Act of the Berne Convention.

As of May 2020 the 1968 act remains in force, but has been amended on a number of occasions. The first major review occurred in 1974 when the Whitlam government appointed the Copyright Law Committee, chaired by Justice Franki, to examine the impact of reprographic reproduction on copyright law in Australia. The committee was also asked to examine the impact of photocopying and "to recommend any alterations to the Australian copyright law to effect a proper balance of interest between owners of copyright and the users of copyright material in respect of reprographic reproduction".

During its deliberation the Franki Committee observed that because Australia was a net importer of copyrighted works it should be careful to not adopt too radical solutions. The Franki Committee recommended, amongst others, the adoption of a statutory licensing scheme. When commencing its review the Committee stated that the primary purpose of copyright law was:

to give to the author of a creative work his just reward for the benefit he has bestowed on the community and also to encourage the making of further creative works. On the other hand, as copyright in the nature of a monopoly, the law should ensure, as far as possible, that the rights conferred are not abused and that study, research and education are not unduly hampered.

The Copyright Act 1968 and legal deposit legislation pertaining to each state mandates that publishers of any kind must deposit copies of their publications in the National Library of Australia as well as in the state or territory library in their jurisdiction. Until the 21st century, this has applied to all types of printed materials (and in some states, to audio-visual formats as well). On 17 February 2016, the federal legal deposit provisions were extended to cover electronic publications of all types. Most states and territories are as of 2020 reviewing or amending existing legislation to extend to digital publications as well.

In September 2025, a Senate Committee on National Cultural Policy, comprising Senators Varun Ghosh (chair), Sarah Henderson, and David Pocock, heard from musicians and others about the threat of AI stealing the intellectual property of creatives. The musicians urged the government to strengthen the Copyright Act 1968 to protect their livelihoods.

=== Copyright Law Review Committee (CLRC) ===
The 1980s and 1990s saw a range of inquiries into many aspects of copyright law. A key driver for those reviews was the establishment of the Copyright Law Review Committee (CLRC) in 1983 as an advisory body for copyright reform. The CLRC was disbanded in 2005 by the Australian government after it had produced a number of reports. Notable reports include: The meaning of Publication in the Copyright Act (1984), Use of Copyright materials by Churches (1985), Performers' Protection (1987), Moral Rights (1988), Report of Journalists' Copyright (1994), Computer Software Protection (1994), Simplification of the Copyright Act: Part 1 (1998), Simplification of the Copyright Act: Part 2 (1999), Jurisdiction and Procedures of the Copyright Tribunal (2002), Copyright and Contract (2002) and Crown Copyright (2005). The CLRC also published reports on specific areas of copyright, including Highways to Change: Copyright in the New Communications Environment: report by the Copyright Convergence Group on technological advancement and the ability of legislation to cope with change (1994), Stopping the Rip-Offs: intellectual Property Protection for Aboriginal & Torres Strait Islander Peoples (1994), the Simpson Report 1995, long title Review of Australian Copyright Collecting Societies, the Bently and Sherman Report 1995, long title Performers' Rights: Options for Reform, the Janke Report 1999, long title Our Culture, Our Future, and the Ergas Report 2000, long title Report on Intellectual Property legislation under Competition Principles Agreement.

=== Copyright Amendment Act 2006 ===
The Copyright Amendment Act 2006 made changes required by the US-Australia Free Trade Agreement. In particular, it strengthened anti-circumvention laws, for the first time making it illegal in Australia to circumvent technical measures used by copyright owners to restrict access to their works, and expanding the measures which count as technological restriction measures which may not be circumvented. Like the FTA language, the new anti-circumvention law is closely modelled on the US Digital Millennium Copyright Act, although it is not identical.

The act also introduced a series of new exceptions into Australian copyright law. The best known are the private copying exceptions, which follow on from proposals by former Attorney-General Philip Ruddock to allow people to record most television or radio program at home to watch at a later time with family or friends, and to format-shift their music (make copies from CDs onto personal computers and portable music players). Unlike some countries in Europe, or Canada, there is no fee or licence payment on players to compensate copyright owners for these private copies, although the exceptions are narrowly defined and do not allow, for example, making copies for friends or family. The Act also introduced a copyright exception allowing parody and satire, and an exception to allow certain non-commercial use by public sector institutions like universities, schools, art galleries and archives, provided that an Australian court decides an exception would be consistent with the Berne three-step test.

The other notable change made by the Act was to expand the provisions concerning criminal copyright infringement. The act introduced strict liability offences for some copyright infringements, and a system of "Infringement Notices" (on-the-spot fines). The stated aim of these provisions is to make copyright easier to enforce, particularly against commercial infringers. After concerns from user groups and the Senate Standing Committee on Legal and Constitutional Affairs, many strict liability offences that would have applied to non-commercial acts were removed from the final bill.

=== 2016 amendment to include digital formats ===
The Statute Law Revision Act (No. 1) 2016 amended the Copyright Act 1968 on 17 February 2016, by which the federal legal deposit provisions were extended to cover electronic publications of all types. and most states and territories are reviewing or amending existing legislation to extend to digital publications as well.

Under the legislation (section 195CD (1) (c) (i)), publishers are required to deposit digital publications without Technological Protection Measures (TPM) or Digital Rights Management (DRM); that is, the copy must contain all content and functionality, without protection measures such as password protection or subscription paywalls.

== Protected subject matter, exclusive rights and infringement ==
Australian copyright law has been influenced significantly by the structure of English law, in addition to the Berne Convention and other international copyright treaties. Thus there is an exhaustive set of types of material protected, and an exhaustive set of exclusive rights.

In terms of the types of material, Australian law confers rights in works, also known as "Part III Works" (after the Part of the Act dealing with this): namely, literary works, musical works, artistic works, and dramatic works. It also confers rights in "other subject matter" (Part IV Subject Matter), which cover the kinds of material protected in some countries by 'neighbouring rights': sound recordings, films, broadcasts, and published editions. To be protected, material must fall into one of these exclusive categories. The rights in Part IV subject matters are more limited, because infringement requires exact copying of the actual subject matter (sound-alikes or remakes are not covered).

In terms of the exclusive rights, different kinds of subject matter have different rights. Owners of copyright in works have rights to reproduce, publish (meaning publish for the first time), perform, and adapt the work, and communicate it to the public (including broadcast, or communicate by making available online). The rights of owners of copyright in artistic works are more limited (there is no right to control public display of artistic works). Owners of copyright in other subject matter have the exclusive right to make copies, to communicate them to the public, and to cause them to be heard/seen in public.

Infringement occurs where a person does an act falling within the copyright owner's exclusive rights, without the authorisation of the copyright owner (assuming that one of the exceptions does not apply).

== Copyright term ==
Before the 2004 Amendments, Australia used a "plus 50" rule to determine when a work entered the public domain. Put simply, a "work" (i.e. a literary, dramatic, musical or artistic work) entered the public domain 50 years following the year of the creator's death, with exceptions.

The Amendments changed the benchmark to "plus 70", which brought Australia into line with the United States of America, the European Union, and certain other jurisdictions, but is longer than the "plus 50" minimum required by the Berne Convention and still applicable in many other jurisdictions, including New Zealand, Papua New Guinea, and many other Commonwealth countries, as well as China, Japan, and South Korea. The extension to "plus 70" does not apply to Crown copyright, to which the "plus 50" rule continues to apply.

Similar to the foreign reciprocity clause in the European Union copyright law, the change to the "plus 70" rule is not retroactive, so that if copyright has expired before the coming into force of the amendment it is not revived. The result is that:

- Any work that was published in the lifetime of the author who died before 1 January 1955, is out of copyright.
- Any work that was published in the lifetime of the author who died on or after 1 January 1955, will be out of copyright 70 years after the author's death.

Additionally, section 210 of the Copyright Act 1968 prevents copyright from arising in works that were published before 1 May 1969 where those works were not themselves subject to copyright at that time.

In Australia, according to section 33 of the Copyright Act 1968, any literary, dramatic, musical or artistic work that was published after the death of the author will continue to subsist under copyright 70 years after the year of first publication. For example, if a work is published 10 years after the author's death, copyright would subsist for 70 years after first publication, that is 80 years after the author's death. It should also be noted indefinite copyright does not apply to artistic works.

Photographs, sound recordings, films, and anonymous/pseudonymous works are copyrighted for 70 years from their first publication. Television and sound broadcasts are copyright for only 50 years after the year of their first broadcast (though the material contained in the broadcast may be separately copyrighted). Most other works are also dated from the first publication/broadcast/performance where this occurred after the author's death.

The Copyright (Disabilities and Other Measures) Act, which was passed on 15 June 2017, abolished the indefinite copyright term for unpublished works. As of 1 January 2019, unpublished works are out of copyright 70 years after the author's death if the author is known, or 70 years after creation otherwise. The period of 70 years is counted from the end of the relevant calendar year.

The United States Sonny Bono Copyright Term Extension Act (1998) defines an entirely different rule based on the year of first publication in the USA. Generally, anything published before 1931 is in the public domain. An interesting consequence of this for the Internet is that a work may be in the public domain in the US but not in Australia, or vice versa. Except for the works falling under the "Rule of the shorter term", copyright does not depend on the country of origin, the country of publication, or the nationality of the author. A work published in the US by a British author may still be in the public domain in Australia if the author died more than 70 years ago or died before 1955, whichever is the shorter.

== Fair dealing ==
The main exceptions to copyright infringement in Australia come under the general heading fair dealing. It is a use of a work specifically recognised as not being a copyright violation. In order to be a fair dealing under Australian law a use must fall within a range of specific purposes. These purposes vary by type of work, but the possibilities are:

- review or criticism
- research or study
- news-reporting
- judicial proceedings or professional legal advice
- parody or satire (added by the Copyright Amendment Act 2006)

In order for a certain use to be a fair dealing, it must fall within one of these purposes and must also be 'fair'. What is fair will depend on all the circumstances, including the nature of the work, the nature of the use and the effect of the use on any commercial market for the work.

Fair dealing is not the same as fair use. This has, for example, been interpreted by US courts to allow for reasonable personal use of works, e.g. media-shifting, which would not necessarily be permitted under Australia's fair dealing laws. Australian copyright law does, however, have a number of additional specific exceptions which permit uses which may fall outside of both fair dealing and fair use. For example, a number of exceptions exist which permit specific uses of computer software.

=== Fair Use proposals ===
While Australian copyright exceptions are based on the Fair Dealing system, Since 1998 a series of Australian government inquiries have examined, and in most cases recommended, the introduction of a "flexible and open" Fair Use system into Australian copyright law. From 1998 to 2017 there have been eight Australian government inquiries which have considered the question of whether fair use should be adopted in Australia. Six reviews have recommended Australia adopt a "Fair Use" model of copyright exceptions: two enquiries specifically into the Copyright Act (1998, 2014); and four broader reviews (both 2004, 2013, 2016). One review (2000) recommended against the introduction of fair use and another (2005) issued no final report. Two of the recommendations were specifically in response to the stricter copyright rules introduced as part of the Australia–United States Free Trade Agreement (AUSFTA), while the most recent two, by the Australian Law Reform Commission (ALRC) and the Productivity Commission (PC) were with reference to strengthening Australia's "digital economy".

== Other exceptions ==
In late 2006, Australia added several 'private copying' exceptions. It is no longer an infringement of copyright to record a broadcast to watch or listen at a more convenient time (s 111), or to make a copy of a sound recording for private and domestic use (e.g., copy onto a portable media player) (s 109A), or make a copy of a literary work, magazine, or newspaper article for private use (43C).

Australia also has:

- a special division of exceptions applying to computer programs (for interoperability, security testing, normal use),
- a special division of exceptions applying to artworks in public places (to allow photography, incidental filming etc.) (see Freedom of Panorama),
- statutory (i.e. compulsory) licences that allow use by schools, universities, and others on payment of a licence fee set either by agreement or by the Copyright Tribunal (see below).

Because Australian copyright law recognises temporary copies stored in computer memory as "reproductions" falling within the copyright owner's exclusive rights, there are also various exceptions for temporary copies made in the ordinary course of use or communication of digital copies of works.

== Moral rights ==
In 2000, moral rights were recognised in Australian copyright legislation under the Copyright Amendment (Moral Rights) Act 2000. Only individuals may exercise moral rights. The moral rights provided under Australian law now are:

- A right of attribution
  - the right to be clearly and reasonably prominently identified as the author, in any reasonable form
  - the right to avoid false attribution, where the work is falsely presented as being another's work
- Integrity of authorship
  - the right to not have the work treated in a derogatory manner (this is a right to protect the honour and reputation of the author)

=== Indigenous communal moral rights ===
There have been various proposals in Australia for the recognition of "Indigenous communal moral rights" (ICMR), aimed at assisting Indigenous people to protect the integrity and sanctity of Indigenous culture. Legislation on moral rights applies to the cultural and intellectual property rights (Indigenous intellectual property ICIP) of Indigenous peoples. After the individual moral rights legislation (Copyright Amendment (Moral Rights) Act 2000) was passed in the Australian Senate, a commitment was given to Senator Aden Ridgeway to look at ICMR.

A draft bill, the Copyright Amendment (Indigenous Communal Moral Rights) Bill 2003 ("ICMR Bill"), was circulated to a limited set of stakeholders in 2003, but was seen as ineffective and unlikely to be passed into legislation because of a number of complications. Criticisms of the bill included that it failed to provide protection where copyright had expired, as well as elements of Indigenous culture and intellectual property (ICIP) where copyright did not apply, such as rock paintings or unrecorded oral histories; and neither did it cover sound recordings.

The bill was set to be reintroduced in mid-2007, as existing legislation did not provide protection for Indigenous communal moral rights. A 2006 paper by Terri Janke and Robynne Quiggin set out the main ICIP issues for the Indigenous arts industry, which included the deficiencies of the Copyright Act with regard to Indigenous art. These include clashes between Australian law and Aboriginal customary laws; and the lack of a "foundation of interaction between Indigenous community and user of the ICMR" in the draft bill.

=== Performers ===
From mid-2007, performers were granted moral rights in recordings of their performances, similar, but not identical, to the moral rights granted to authors. These were introduced as a result of Australia's ratification of the WIPO Performances and Phonograms Treaty, which was required by the Australia's free trade agreement with Singapore, and the Australia-United States Free Trade Agreement.

== Ownership of copyright ==
Copyright is free and automatic upon creation of the work. In general, the first owner of copyright will be the author (for literary, musical, dramatic and artistic works) or producer (for sound recordings and films) or broadcaster (for broadcasts). Under Australian law, where an employee is the author, the first owner of copyright is the employer (this is slightly different from the US work for hire doctrine: in Australia, duration of copyright is still measured by the lifetime of the employee author). In 2004–2005, Australia also introduced some complicated provisions that give performers part ownership rights in sound recordings, and directors some limited ownership rights in relation to films.

In the case of a photograph commissioned for a "private or domestic purpose", the copyright will be owned by the commissioner of the work. The "private and domestic purposes" condition took effect on 30 July 1998, prior to this the copyright of all commissioned photographs was assigned to the commissioner.

A copyright notice (©) is not required on a work to gain copyright, but only the copyright owner is entitled to place a notice. It is useful in publishing the date of first publication and the owner. Where a copyright notice is used, the onus in infringement proceedings is on the defendant to show that copyright does not subsist or is not owned by the person stated in the notice.

== Government-owned copyright ==
The Australian Commonwealth and State governments routinely own copyright in Australia. While this could be seen as being due to the concept of the Crown being traditionally paramount rather than the people, it is more influenced by the then British Commonwealth acting as a copyright policy-making body in the 1950s, which was the basis of the Copyright Act 1968.

The Australian government does not infringe copyright if its actions (or those of an authorised person) are for the government. A "relevant collecting society" may sample government copies and charge the government.

The state governments follow different practices in regard to licensing, fees and waivers.

The Australian Attorney-General's Copyright Law Review Committee completed a large review of Crown Copyright in April 2005. In summary, the Committee recommended that the Crown be treated like any other employer (i.e., owner of material produced by its employees), and that for certain materials (legislation, government reports, commissions of inquiry reports) either copyright be removed, or a generous and generalised licence be granted for re-use. As of early 2007, several governments appear to be considering the use of open licences modelled along the lines of the Creative Commons model.

Copyrights owned by the Crown in Australia have different durations to publicly held copyrights, as below:

Published literary, dramatic or musical works (includes published official records)	50 years after the end of the year in which the work is first published
Unpublished literary, dramatic, musical works	Copyright subsists indefinitely (see below)
Artistic works	50 years from the end of the year when made
Photographs	50 years from the end of the year when made

- The indefinite copyright term for unpublished works was abolished by the Copyright (Disabilities and Other Measures) Act 2017. This part of the Act comes into effect on 1 January 2019. As of that date, Crown Copyright for unpublished works expires 50 years after it was made.

== Notable cases ==
=== Yanggarriny Wunungmurra v. Peter Stripes Fabrics (1983) ===
In 1983, Wunungmurra was the first Aboriginal artist to have his copyright recognised in an Australian court. The case, Yanggarriny Wunungmurra v. Peter Stripes Fabrics was won against the Australian Copyright Act 1968, which had previously not considered Aboriginal Australian designs to be "original" and thereby protected under copyright.

=== Carpets case (1994) ===
The "Carpets Case" was one of three Federal Court judgments in the 1990s involving the use of copyright law relating to Indigenous cultural and intellectual property (ICIP).

In 1993, it was found that a number of designs by Aboriginal artists had been reproduced without permission on rugs made in Vietnam and marketed by the Perth-based company Indofurn Pty Ltd. Banduk Marika, George Milpurrurru, Tim Payungka Tjapangarti, and five other artists or their estates moved to seek reparations under the Copyright Act 1968 and Trade Practices Act, in a case that became known as the "carpets case". Officially it is referred to as Milpurrurru v Indofurn Pty Ltd.

In 1994, after a trial lasting 14 days, Justice John von Doussa in the Federal Court of Australia, saying that the copyright infringements had been "plainly deliberate and calculated", awarded damages of A$188,000 to the artists as a group, in line with their wishes, and ordered that the rugs be released to them. This was the largest penalty awarded for copyright infringement against Australian artists up to that time, and included compensation for cultural damage stemming from the unauthorised use of sacred imagery, and in particular the "cultural hurt suffered by the artists as a result of the company’s persistent denial of their copyright". However no damages were ever paid to the artists or their next-of-kin, because the company was declared bankrupt and wound up.

Michael Blakeney (1995) noted that the Carpets Case had represented an improvement on an earlier case, Yumbulul v Reserve Bank of Australia 1991, in which Galpu clan artist Terry Yumbulul's Morning Star Pole had been reproduced on the ten-dollar note, in terms of protection of Aboriginal works and folklore. However, the Copyright Act "requires creators who are in a position to assert copyright ownership", which proves a problem where the designs had been created more than the specified time after the creator's death; in the case of many ancient designs, it is impossible to identify the creator. Erin Mackay of the Indigenous Law Centre at UNSW (2009) wrote that the case has been noted as an important one in Indigenous case law because of the damages awarded for the cultural harm done; however, the Act does not provide "judicial recognition of the nature and obligations of Indigenous groups in establishing copyright ownership". Bulun Bulun v R & T Textiles (T-shirts case) (1998) was the third case involving copyright law and ICIP, and was the subject of further legal analysis relating to the protecting Indigenous art, and its relationship to Indigenous communal moral rights (ICMR).

== Copyright Tribunal ==
The Copyright Tribunal of Australia was established under the Copyright Act 1968, and has specific powers relating to royalties and licensing. It is an independent body, administered by the Federal Court of Australia, consisting of three Federal Court judges who act as president and deputy president, and other members who are appointed by the Governor-General of Australia.

The Tribunal's key function is to determine remuneration payable under the licence schemes provided for under the Copyright Act, such as provisions that permit reproduction of certain copyright materials by educational institutions, institutions assisting persons with certain disabilities, and government agencies. The Tribunal has jurisdiction to confirm or vary an existing or proposed voluntary licence scheme, or substitute a new scheme, where it has been referred to it by a party.

== Collecting societies ==
A number of copyright collecting societies operate in Australia. Collecting societies are established to collect royalties for uses of copyright material on behalf of authors and copyright owners: they assist to overcome the significant transaction costs that would face individual creators in monitoring, enforcing, and licensing their rights. A notable feature of some of the Australian collecting societies is that some are 'declared' to be the society with the function of being the sole collector of royalties under the statutory licences. The collecting societies in Australia are:

- APRA AMCOS, consisting of the formerly separate:
  - Australasian Mechanical Copyright Owners Society (AMCOS): represents music publishers and writers from for rights in the reproduction of musical works;
  - Australasian Performing Right Association (APRA): collects royalties for the owners of copyright in musical works for the performance of their musical works;
- Christian Copyright Licensing International (CCLI)
- Copyright Agency Limited (CAL): collects royalties for the reproduction of printed material, and in particular, administers the statutory licences that allow educational institutions to copy and communicate printed material;
  - Educational institutions undertook to pay "equitable remuneration" to CAL for their right to make copies of literacy, dramatic, musical and artistic works for educational purposes.
    - "Equitable remuneration" is should be fair and reasonable or just in all circumstances to both the copyright owner and the licensee.
    - New equitable remuneration rates were decided with a starting point from the 1985 rate of 2 cents per page copied and adjusted for the Consumer Price Index, then further increased, on the basis of changing methods of teaching, technology and volume of copying. The new rate came into operation on 1 January 1997.
- Phonographic Performance Company of Australia (PPCA): collects royalties for performers for the broadcast, communication or public playing of recorded music;
- Screenrights: set up in 1990 to administer statutory licences that let educational institutions copy from TV and radio for teaching.
- Viscopy, formerly the Visual Arts Copyright Collecting Agency (VISCOPY), which licensed the copyright in artistic works, merged with Copyright Agency (see above) in 2017.

== Timeline ==
- 1869 – First colonial copyright statute is passed in Victoria. South Australia, New South Wales, and Western Australia enact similar laws in 1878, 1879 and 1895 respectively.
- 1901 – Federation of Australia. The Federal Parliament, pursuant to section 51(xviii) of the Australian Constitution, is granted the power to make laws with respect to "Copyrights, patents of inventions and designs, and trade marks."
- 1905 – Copyright Act 1905 (Cth) is passed.
- 1912 – Copyright Act 1912 (Cth) is passed. Pursuant to section 8 of that Act, the entire Copyright Act 1911 (Imp), passed by the Parliament of the United Kingdom, is enacted into the law of Australia.
- 1958 – In Copyright Owners Reproduction Society v E.M.I. (Australia) the High Court of Australia finds that the new UK copyright statute, the Copyright Act 1956, does not apply in Australia and the 1911 Imperial Act remains law.
- 1959 – The committee to Consider What Alterations Are Desirable in the Copyright Law of the Commonwealth (Spicer Committee) delivers its final report. It recommends that the majority of provisions appearing in the Copyright Act 1956 (UK) should be adopted. However, another eight years pass before a new Australian statute is introduced.
- 1966 – Dr David Malangi Daymirringu's mortuary rites story bark painting was used by the Reserve Bank of Australia on the one dollar note without his permission. Compensation and credit were later supplied.
- 1968 – Copyright Act 1968 (Cth) is enacted. It repealed the 1912 and the accompanying 1911 statutes.
- 1973, 1976, 1977, 1979, 1980, 1981, 1982, 1983 – various amendments
- 1984 – amendment, defined computer program in the Copyright Act
- 1985, 1986, 1987, 1988 – various amendments
- 1989 – Copyright Amendment Act 1989 (repealed)
  - Levy introduced on blank tapes
- 1991, 1992 – various amendments
- 1992 – Autodesk Inc v Dyason ("AutoCAD case").
  - The High Court judged that the reproduction of a lookup table in an EPROM in a third-party hardware lock was an infringement of a literary work.
- 1993 – amendment
- 1993 – Australian Tape Manufacturers Association Ltd v Commonwealth ("blank tapes levy case").
  - The High Court struck down the 1989 levy as, essentially, badly located and unfair tax law and not a royalty.
- 1994 – The "carpets case", awarding damages to eight Indigenous Australian artists whose designs had been used on rugs made in Vietnam by a Perth company.
- 1994 (3x) – various amendments
- 14 August 1997 – Telstra Corporation v Australasian Performing Right Association ("music on hold case").
  - The High Court found that music-on-hold transmitted by Telstra was a copyright infringement
- 1998 (3x), and 1999 (2x) – various amendments
- 2000 – Copyright Amendment (Digital Agenda) Act
- 2000 – Copyright Amendment (Moral Rights) Act
- 2001 – Law and Justice Legislation Amendment (Application of Criminal Code) Act
  - 26 July 2002 – Kabushiki Kaisha Sony Computer Entertainment v Stevens
  - Federal Court decides that mod chips for Sony game consoles do not contravene copyright, due to representations from the Australian Competition & Consumer Commission (ACCC) as amicus curiae.
- Federal Court decision ultimately upheld by the High Court in Stevens v Kabushiki Kaisha Sony Computer Entertainment.
- 2003 – Copyright Amendment (Parallel Importation) Act
  - Made some provisions for parallel importing, affecting the 'grey market'.
- 2003 – Designs (Consequential Amendments) Act
- November 2003 – Three Australian students received criminal convictions for copyright infringement, receiving a mix of suspended sentences, a fine, and community service.
- 7 February 2004 – KaZaA's Sharman Networks and Brilliant Digital Entertainment in Australia were raided for copyright violations using Anton Piller orders, along with the University of New South Wales, University of Queensland, Monash University, Telstra BigPond and three Sydney Internet service providers. The investigation was backed by Universal, EMI, BMG, Festival Mushroom Records, Sony and Warner Music.
- 8 February 2004 - Australia and the United States agree to text of bilateral free trade agreement (AUSFTA). The copyright-related parts of the Intellectual Property Chapter were:
  - Longer duration of copyright
  - Agreed standards for: copyright protection, copyright infringement, remedies and penalties
  - WIPO Internet Treaties to be implemented by "entry into force" of the FTA
  - Fast-tracking copyright owners' engagement with Internet service providers and subscribers to deal with allegedly infringing copyright material on the Internet
  - Tighter controls on circumventing technological restriction of copyrighted material, with a possibility of public submissions
  - Tougher on unauthorised satellite Pay-TV signal decoding
- 9 February 2004 – Australia and the United States sign the FTA.
- August 2004 – US Free Trade Agreement Implementation Act passes Senate, with amendments. References to documents and commentary.
- November 2004 – KaZaA case starts in Federal Court.
- December 2004 – Copyright Legislation Amendment Act passes, affecting parallel importing, temporary copies and Internet service providers' liability for taking down alleged infringing material.
- 1 January 2005 – The U.S.–Australia Free Trade Agreement (FTA) officially comes into force.
- September 2005 – Federal Court of Australia finds Kazaa liable for copyright infringement and hands down judgment in favour of Universal Music Australia Pty Ltd.
- December 2006 – Copyright Amendment Act is passed. Effective January 2007, the Act (a) strengthens criminal infringement provisions, (b) adds new exceptions including for parody or satire, and private copying, (c) strengthens anti-circumvention law to make it more like the US Digital Millennium Copyright Act (as required by the Australia–US FTA), and (d) makes some changes to provisions affecting libraries and educational institutions.
- June 2015 – The Copyright Amendment (Online Infringement) Bill 2015 introduced into parliament to curb online piracy passed with Coalition and Labor's support 37-13
- 22 December 2017 – The Copyright Amendment (Disability and Other Measures) Act 2017 becomes effective.
- 24 January 2022 – Ownership of the Aboriginal flag is transferred to the federal government.

== See also ==
- Australian Copyright Council
- International copyright
- National edeposit system

== Sources ==
- Factsheets from the Attorney-General's Department on the Copyright Amendment Bill 2006
- Copyright Amendment Act at ComLaw (Commonwealth of Australia Law, Attorney General's Department)
- Senate Legal and Constitutional Affairs Committee on the Provisions of the Copyright Amendment Bill 2006
- Australian Copyright Act 1968 as amended (Cth)
- Chapter 17 of the Free Trade Agreement
- Information Sheets, Australian Copyright Council
- Australian Attorney-General's Copyright Law Review Committee
- DFAT - AUSFTA Fact-sheet - Intellectual Property
- Australian Digital Alliance - Monthly IP Wrap-Up - December 2002
- Federal Court of Australia
- Copyright laws need update for web
