= Youxi, Ruyuan County =

Youxi Town 游溪镇
- Town
- Location in Guangdong.
- Coordinates: 24°57′00″N 113°20′44″E
- Country: People's Republic of China
- Province: Guangdong
- Prefecture-level city: Shaoguan
- Autonomous county: Ruyuan Yao Autonomous County

Area
  - Total: 133.60 km^{2} (51.58 sq mi)

Population (2018)
  - Total: 12,805
  - Density: 95.846/km^{2} (248.24/sq mi)
- Time zone: UTC+08:00 (China Standard)
- Postal code: 512735
- Area code: 0751

Youxi (simplified Chinese: 游溪镇; traditional Chinese: 遊溪鎮; pinyin: Yóuxī Zhèn) is a town in Ruyuan Yao Autonomous County, Guangdong, China. As of the 2018 census it had a population of 12,805 and an area of 133.60-square-kilometre (51.58 sq mi).

== Administrative division ==
As of 2016, the town is divided into one community and eleven villages:

- Zhongxin Community (中心社区)
- Zhongxindong (中心洞村)
- Da (大村)
- Lengshuiqi (冷水岐村)
- Liantangbian (连塘边村)
- Zhonglian (中联村)
- Jiangbei (江背村)
- Lie (烈村)
- Daliaokeng (大寮坑村)
- Yingkeng (营坑村)
- Shangying (上营村)
- Cilangkeng (茨良坑村)

== History ==
It was formed as a township in 1953. In 1993, it was upgraded to a town. In 2005, Liukeng Town (柳坑镇) was merged into the town.

== Geography ==
The town is situated at the northeastern Ruyuan Yao Autonomous County. It is surrounded by Bibei Town on the north, Dongping Town on the west, Guitou Town on the east, and Yiliu Town on the south.

The Xinjie River (新街水) flows through the town northwest to east.

== Economy ==
The local economy is primarily based upon agriculture and local industry. Economic crops are mainly watermelon, sugarcane, and peanut.

== Demographics ==
Population census
Year	Pop.	±%
2007	10,870	—
2018	12,805	+17.8%

As of 2018, the National Bureau of Statistics of China estimates the current population of the township to be 12,805.

== Transportation ==
The Provincial Highway S250 runs from north–south highway within the town.

The National Expressway G0423 Lechang–Guangzhou Expressway, traverses the town from north to south.
