= Yiliu, Ruyuan County =

Yiliu Town 一六镇
- Town
- Location in Guangdong.
- Coordinates: 24°49′53″N 113°23′12″E
- Country: People's Republic of China
- Province: Guangdong
- Prefecture-level city: Shaoguan
- Autonomous county: Ruyuan Yao Autonomous County
- Designated (town): 1986

Area
  - Total: 77.58 km^{2} (29.95 sq mi)

Population (2018)
  - Total: 17,560
  - Density: 226.3/km^{2} (586.2/sq mi)
- Time zone: UTC+08:00 (China Standard)
- Postal code: 512737
- Area code: 0751

Yiliu (simplified Chinese: 一六镇; traditional Chinese: 一六鎮; pinyin: Yīliù Zhèn) is a town in Ruyuan Yao Autonomous County, Guangdong, China. As of the 2018 census it had a population of 17,560 and an area of 77.58-square-kilometre (29.95 sq mi).

== Administrative division ==
As of 2016, the town is divided into one community and seven villages:

- Weimin Community (为民社区)
- Yiliu (一六村)
- Dongqi (东七村)
- Dongfen (东粉村)
- Tuanjie (团结村)
- Luowu (罗屋村)
- Lequn (乐群村)
- Xi'an (西岸村)

== History ==
After the establishment of the Communist State, it was known as "Yiliu Township". In 1974, it came under the jurisdiction of Ruyuan Yao Autonomous County, previously it belonged to Qujiang County. In 1986, it was upgraded to a town.

== Geography ==
The town sits at northeastern Ruyuan Yao Autonomous County, it is surrounded by Youxi Town on the north, Dongping Town on the west, Wujiang District on the east, and Rucheng Town on the south.

== Economy ==
The region abounds with tungsten, quartz bell, and beryl.

== Demographics ==
Population census
Year	Pop.	±%
2007	15,221	—
2018	17,560	+15.4%

As of 2018, the National Bureau of Statistics of China estimates the township's population now to be 17,560.

== Transportation ==
The Provincial Highway S250 passes across the town northeast to southwest.

The G0423 Lechang–Guangzhou Expressway is a north–south expressway travels through the eastern town.
