= Dabu =

Dabu may refer to:

== Places in China ==
- Dabu County (大埔县), county in Meizhou, Guangdong
- Dabu, Ruyuan County (大布镇), a town in Ruyuan County, Guangdong
- Dabu, Gan County (大埠鄉), village in Gan County, Ganzhou, Jiangxi
- Dabu, Guilin City (大埠鄉), village in Yanshan District, Guilin, Guangxi

== Other ==
- Agob language, also called Dabu, a Papuan language spoken in Western Province, Papua New Guinea
- 3611 Dabu, a minor planet discovered in 1981
- Omar Dabbous, also called Dabu, an audio designer who has made soundtracks for games

== See also ==
- Dapu, Chiayi (大埔鄉), township in Taiwan whose name would be spelled Dabu in Pinyin
- Dabu-dabu, hot and spicy condiment found in the cuisine of Manado, North Sulawesi
- Dabus, fictional group from the Dungeons & Dragons Planescape setting
- DABUS, artificial intelligence system named as an inventor in two patent applications
- Dabbu, Indian musician
- Randhir Kapoor (born 1947), Indian actor, sometimes informally referred to as Dabbu
