= Rucheng, Ruyuan County =

Rucheng 乳城镇
- Town
- Location in Guangdong.
- Coordinates: 24°46′35″N 113°16′03″E
- Country: People's Republic of China
- Province: Guangdong
- Prefecture-level city: Shaoguan
- Autonomous county: Ruyuan Yao Autonomous County

Area
  - Total: 209.75 km^{2} (80.98 sq mi)

Population (2018)
  - Total: 68,143
  - Density: 324.88/km^{2} (841.43/sq mi)
- Time zone: UTC+08:00 (China Standard)
- Postal code: 512799
- Area code: 0751

Rucheng (simplified Chinese: 乳城镇; traditional Chinese: 乳城鎮; pinyin: Rǚchéng Zhèn) is a town in Ruyuan Yao Autonomous County, Guangdong, China. As of the 2018 census it had a population of 68,143 and an area of 209.75-square-kilometre (80.98 sq mi). It is the political, economic and cultural center of Ruyuan Yao Autonomous County.

== Administrative division ==
As of 2016, the town is divided into five communities and thirteen villages:

- Yingfeng Community (鹰峰社区)
- Yuanfeng Community (源峰社区)
- Yunfeng Community (云峰社区)
- Songfeng Community (松峰社区)
- Kangle Community (康乐社区)
- Hebei (河北村)
- Daqun (大群村)
- Bachang (坝厂村)
- Dalian (大联村)
- Yunmen (云门村)
- Xianming (鲜明村)
- Lingxi (岭溪村)
- Gonghe (共和村)
- Xinmin (新民村)
- Jianmin (健民村)
- Dadong (大东村)
- Qianjin (前进村)
- Xinxing (新兴村)

== History ==
Rucheng has been the county seat since 1368, at the dawn of the Ming dynasty (1368–1644).

In 1931, it split into two towns, Zhoujei (洲街镇) and Fucheng (附城镇). In 1941, it was renamed "Yunfeng Town" (云峰镇), named after Yunmen Temple and Shuangfeng County.

In June 1957, it split into a town and a township, Fucheng Town (附城镇) and Hougongdu Township (侯公渡乡). In September 1958, Fucheng, Hougongdu Township and Longnan Township (龙南乡) merged to form Xingfu People's Commune (幸福人民公社). It was renamed "Ruyuan Commune" (乳源公社) in February 1959. In June 1962, a part of Ruyuan Commune was separated to establish Fucheng Commune (附城公社). Fucheng Commune was renamed Chengguanzhen Commune (城关镇公社) in February 1963. In 1976, Chengguanzhen Commune was redesignated Rucheng Town. In 2005, the former Rucheng Town and Hougongtang Town (侯公塘镇) merged to form the new Rucheng Town.

== Geography ==
It lies at the southeastern of Ruyuan Yao Autonomous County, bordering Dongping Town to the west, Wujiang District to the south, the towns of Youxi and Yiliu to the north, and Wujiang District to the east.

Yunmen Mountain and Shuangfeng Mountain are the most famous mountains in the town.

The Nanshui River (南水河) flows through the town northwest to southeast.

The town is in the subtropical monsoon climate zone, with an average annual temperature of 19.8 °C (67.6 °F), total annual rainfall of 1,750.3-millimetre (68.91 in), and a frost-free period of 312 days.

== Economy ==
The town's economy is based on agriculture, industry, and commerce. Its cement is very famous and sells well in Guangdong.

== Demographics ==
Population census
Year	Pop.	±%
2007	61,994	—
2018	68,143	+9.9%

As of 2018, the National Bureau of Statistics of China estimates the township's population now to be 68,143.

== Tourist attraction ==
The Wenchang Pavilion (文昌阁) is a Confucian temple located in the town, which was originally built in the Wanli period (1573–1620) of the Ming dynasty (1368–1644). The temple is renowned for its pagoda. The pagoda has a height of 19-metre (62 ft), consisting of seven storey in total and the plane of the pagoda is hexagonal.

The Guanyin Temple (观音堂) is a Buddhist temple, its original temple dates back to the 16th century.

The Rucheng Hot Spring (乳城温泉) is a popular attraction.

== Transportation ==
The G4 Beijing–Hong Kong and Macau Expressway, more commonly known as "Jing–Gang–Ao Expressway", is a northwest–southeast highway passing through the town's downtown, commercial, and industrial area of the town.

The National Highway G240, commonly abbreviated as G240, is also a northwest–southeast highway passing through the town's downtown, commercial, and industrial area of the town.

The National Highway G323, commonly abbreviated as G323, travels through the southwestern town.

The G0423 Lechang–Guangzhou Expressway, also popularly known as Le–Guang Expressway, is a north–south highway passing through the east of the town limits.

The Provincial Highway S250 connects the town to Guitou Town.

== Notable people ==
- Liu Tianci, politician in the Song dynasty (960–1279).
