= Guitou =

Guitou Town 桂头镇
- Town
- Location in Guangdong.
- Coordinates: 24°56′50″N 113°25′34″E
- Country: People's Republic of China
- Province: Guangdong
- Prefecture-level city: Shaoguan
- Autonomous county: Ruyuan Yao Autonomous County
- Designated (town): 1986

Area
  - Total: 124.51 km^{2} (48.07 sq mi)

Population (2018)
  - Total: 38,102
  - Density: 306.02/km^{2} (792.58/sq mi)
- Time zone: UTC+08:00 (China Standard)
- Postal code: 512736
- Area code: 0751

Guitou (simplified Chinese: 桂头镇; traditional Chinese: 桂頭鎮; pinyin: Guìtóu Zhèn) is a town in Ruyuan Yao Autonomous County, Guangdong, China. As of the 2018 census it had a population of 38,102 and an area of 124.51-square-kilometre (48.07 sq mi).

== Etymology ==
The town is named after Gui Mountain (桂山), also known as Guitang Mountain (桂塘山).

== Administrative division ==
As of 2016, the town is divided into one community and fourteen villages:

- Guitou Community (桂头社区)
- Mojia (莫家村)
- Qixingdun (七星墩村)
- Hongling (红岭村)
- Daba (大坝村)
- Huang (凰村)
- Xiaojiang (小江村)
- Tangtou (塘头村)
- Wanglongwei (王龙围村)
- Songwei (松围村)
- Yangpo (阳陂村)
- Yangxi (杨溪村)
- Dong'an (东岸村)
- Jun (均村)
- Caotianping (草田坪村)

== History ==
In 1940, it was known as "Renhe Township" (仁和乡).

In 1957, it was the county seat of Ruyuan Yao Autonomous County. In 1958, it was renamed was "Guitou Commune". In 1986, it was upgraded to a town. In November 1988, Yangxi Township (杨溪乡) separated from the town. In February 2001, Fangdong Forestry Station (方洞林场) and Yangxi Township merged into Guitou.

== Geography ==
The town is situated at the northeastern Ruyuan Yao Autonomous County. It borders the towns of Youxi and Bibei in the northwest, Wujiang District and Zhenjiang District in the southeast, and Lechang in the north.

The Wu River (武江) winds through the town.

== Economy ==
The local economy is primarily based upon agriculture and local industry. Significant crops include rice and corn. Commercial crops include vegetable, peanut, and chilli. The main industries are paper industry, iron and steel industry, manual processing industry and hydropower industry.

== Demographics ==
Population census
Year	Pop.	±%
2007	34,690	—
2018	38,102	+9.8%

As of 2018, the National Bureau of Statistics of China estimates the township's population now to be 38,102.

== Transportation ==
The G0423 Lechang–Guangzhou Expressway, also popularly known as Le–Guang Expressway, is a north–south highway passing through the west of the town limits.

Started from Guitou, the Provincial Highway S250 travels southwest to Rucheng Town.

The Provincial Highway S248, passes across the town northwest to southeast.

== Notable people ==
- Hou Andu, general in the Chen dynasty (557–589).
