= Dongping, Ruyuan County =

Dongping Town 东坪镇
- Town
- Location in Guangdong.
- Coordinates: 24°51′30″N 113°11′34″E
- Country: People's Republic of China
- Province: Guangdong
- Prefecture-level city: Shaoguan
- Autonomous county: Ruyuan Yao Autonomous County

Area
  - Total: 332.97 km^{2} (128.56 sq mi)

Population (2018)
  - Total: 12,914
  - Density: 38.784/km^{2} (100.45/sq mi)
- Time zone: UTC+08:00 (China Standard)
- Postal code: 512722
- Area code: 0755

Dongping (simplified Chinese: 东坪镇; traditional Chinese: 東坪鎮; pinyin: Dōngpíng Zhèn) is a town in Ruyuan Yao Autonomous County, Guangdong, China. As of the 2018 census it had a population of 12,914 and an area of 332.97-square-kilometre (128.56 sq mi).

== Administrative division ==
As of 2016, the town is divided into one community and ten villages:

- Longhu Community (龙湖社区)
- Dongtian (东田村)
- Changxi (长溪村)
- Xin (新村)
- Chaping (茶坪村)
- Xiazhai (下寨村)
- Nanshui (南水村)
- Fangwu (方武村)
- Tangpen (汤盆村)
- Longxi (龙溪村)
- Tixia (梯下村)

== History ==
In 1983, it was known as Dongping District (东坪区). In 1986, it was renamed "Dongping Township". In 1994, it was upgraded to a town. In 2005, Longnan (龙南镇) was merged into the town.

== Geography ==
The town sits at the northwestern Ruyuan Yao Autonomous County. The town shares a border with Luoyang Town to the west, the towns of Bibei and Youxi to the east, Daqiao Town to the north, and Rucheng Town to the south.

The South Water Lake (南水湖) is located in the town. It is the third largest lake in Guangdong. The lake provides drinking water and water for irrigation.

== Economy ==
The local economy is primarily based upon agriculture and local industry. The main crop of the region is rice, followed by peanuts and vegetables.

== Demographics ==
Population census
Year	Pop.	±%
2007	11,357	—
2018	12,914	+13.7%

As of 2018, the National Bureau of Statistics of China estimates the township's population now to be 12,914.

== Tourist attractions ==
The South Water Lake (南水湖) is a popular attraction. The lake provides an attractive setting for many outdoor activities, including fishing, pleasure boating, and hiking.

== Transportation ==
The National Highway G323 winds through the town.
