= Milpurrurru v Indofurn Pty Ltd =

Australian court case

- Court: Federal Court of Australia
- Full case name: George Milpurrurru, Banduk Marika, Tim Payunka and the Public Trustee of the Northern Territory v Indofurn Pty Ltd, Brian Alexander Bethune, George Raymond King and Robert James Rylands
- Decided: 13 December 1994
- Citation: [1994] FCA 1544
- Legislation cited: Copyright Act 1968 (Cth)

Court membership
- Judge sitting: Von Doussa J

Area of law
- Copyright, Intellectual property

Milpurrurru v Indofurn Pty Ltd (the Carpets Case) was one of three Federal Court of Australia judgments in the 1990s involving the use of copyright law in Australia relating to Indigenous cultural and intellectual property (ICIP), the others being Yumbulul v Reserve Bank of Australia (1991) and Bulun Bulun v R & T Textiles (1998), or "T-shirts case".

The trial was the result of three Aboriginal artists and the estates of five others taking action against Perth import company Infordurn, for using their designs as a basis for carpets which were made in Vietnam and then imported into Australia. After a trial lasting two weeks, Justice Von Doussa awarded damages of A$188,640 in total, for breaches of the Copyright Act 1968 and Trade Practices Act, awarding punitive damages for cultural harm.

== Background ==
In 1993, it was found that a number of designs by Aboriginal artists had been reproduced without permission on rugs made in Vietnam and marketed by the Perth-based company Indofurn Pty Ltd, named Beechrow at the time. The firm had used documents produced by the Australian National Gallery as educational materials and a calendar published by the Australian Information Service as a basis for the designs, both of which included text noting the spiritual significance of the designs. Beechrow did not seek permission from the artists, although they did write a letter to the Aboriginal Arts Management Association (AAMA, later the National Indigenous Arts Advocacy Association (NIAAA)) which was not received or acknowledged.

The issue went beyond copyright relating to individual ownership, as the designs were sacred or sensitive, and the artists had specific responsibilities to their communities with regard to how they were represented and used. Walking on the designs would not have been acceptable to the communities. There were secret Dreaming stories included in the art, specific to and only understood by those in the cultural group concerned. As an example, one of the artists, Banduk Marika, had particular responsibility and rights for representing the story of Djang'kawu and his two sisters, ancestral creators who landed at Yalangbara and gave rise to the Rirratjingu clan. She explained: "I hold the image on trust for all the other Yolngu with an interest in the story".

Banduk Marika, George Milpurrurru, Tim Payungka Tjapangarti, and five other artists or their estates moved to seek reparations under the Copyright Act 1968 and the Trade Practices Act, in a case that became known as the "carpets case", officially referred to as Milpurrurru v Indofurn Pty Ltd.

The NIAAA, a not-for-profit Indigenous arts advocacy organisation (1990–2002; formerly AAMA – see above), conducted the case on behalf of the artists.

== Trial ==
Hearings took place in Darwin and Perth, between 25 and 29 July 1994, and 22 November and 1 December 1994, presided over by Justice John von Doussa, with the judgment delivered from Adelaide by videolink to Perth on 13 December 1994.

== Findings ==
Justice Von Doussa, saying that the copyright infringements had been "plainly deliberate and calculated", awarded damages of A$188,640 to the artists as a group, in line with their wishes, and ordered that the rugs be released to them. The award included compensation for cultural damage stemming from the unauthorised use of sacred imagery, and in particular the "cultural hurt suffered by the artists as a result of the company's persistent denial of their copyright". The judge took into account that some deliberate changes made to some of the designs, for labour-saving purposes, had caused the artists further humiliation and distress, as they did not properly represent the Dreaming stories.

In addition to the copyright breaches, the Trade Practices Act was infringed because the labels misled consumers into thinking that royalties would have been paid to the original artists.

Justice Von Doussa said:

The reproduction of paintings which depict Dreaming stories and designs of cultural significance has been a matter of great concern to the Aboriginal community. Pirating of Aboriginal designs and paintings for commercial use without the consent of the artist or the traditional owners was common for a long time. The recognition of the sacred and religious significance of these paintings, and the restrictions which Aboriginal law and culture imposes on their reproduction, is only now being understood by the white community.

== Aftermath and significance ==
This was the largest penalty awarded for copyright infringement against Australian artists up to that time, and it included compensation for cultural damage stemming from the unauthorised use of sacred imagery. However, no damages were ever paid to the artists or their next-of-kin, because the company was declared bankrupt and wound up.

The trial was the second of three Federal Court judgments on the issue of Indigenous intellectual property, the other two being Yumbulul v Reserve Bank of Australia (1991) and Bulun Bulun v R & T Textiles (1998), or "T-shirts case". In the 1991 case, Galpu clan artist Terry Yumbulul's Morning Star Pole had been reproduced on the ten-dollar note.

Michael Blakeney (1995) noted that the Carpets Case had represented an improvement on Yumbulul v Reserve Bank of Australia, in terms of protection of Aboriginal works and folklore. However, the Copyright Act "requires creators who are in a position to assert copyright ownership", which proves a problem where the designs had been created more than the specified time after the creator's death; in the case of many ancient designs, it is impossible to identify the creator.

Erin Mackay of the Indigenous Law Centre at UNSW (2009) wrote that the case has been noted as an important one in Indigenous case law because of the damages awarded for the cultural harm done; however, the Act does not provide "judicial recognition of the nature and obligations of Indigenous groups in establishing copyright ownership", and was the subject of further legal analysis relating to the protecting Indigenous art, and its relationship to Indigenous communal moral rights (ICMR).
