= Bibei =

Bibei Town 必背镇
- Town
- Location in Guangdong.
- Coordinates: 25°00′52″N 113°16′50″E
- Country: People's Republic of China
- Province: Guangdong
- Prefecture-level city: Shaoguan
- Autonomous county: Ruyuan Yao Autonomous County

Area
  - Total: 146.77 km^{2} (56.67 sq mi)

Population (2017)
  - Total: 7,737
  - Density: 52.72/km^{2} (136.5/sq mi)
- Time zone: UTC+08:00 (China Standard)
- Postal code: 512732
- Area code: 0751

Bibei (simplified Chinese: 必背镇; traditional Chinese: 必背鎮; pinyin: Bìbèi Zhèn) is a town in Ruyuan Yao Autonomous County, Guangdong, China. As of the 2017 census it had a population of 7,737 and an area of 146.77-square-kilometre (56.67 sq mi).

== Administrative division ==
As of 2016, the town is divided into one community and seven villages:

- Bibeikou Community (必背口社区)
- Bibei (必背村)
- Guikeng (桂坑村)
- Gongkeng (公坑村)
- Wangcha (王茶村)
- Bankeng (半坑村)
- Hengxi (横溪村)
- Fangdong (方洞村)

== History ==
It was formed as a township in 1957. In 1986, it was upgraded to a town. In 2005, the village of Fangdong (方洞村) came under the jurisdiction of the town.

== Geography ==
The town sits at the northern Ruyuan Yao Autonomous County. The town shares a border with Daqiao Town to the west, Guitou Town to the east, Lechang to the north, and the towns of Dongping and Youxi to the south.

The Hengxi Reservoir (横溪水库) is located in the town.

The Yangxi River (杨溪河) flows west to east through the town.

== Economy ==
The economy of the province is largest based on agriculture and local industry.

== Demographics ==
Population census
Year	Pop.	±%
2007	7,275	—
2017	7,737	+6.4%

As of 2017, the National Bureau of Statistics of China estimates the township's population now to be 7,737.

== Transportation ==
The County Road X325 winds through the town.
