= Luoyang, Ruyuan County =

Luoyang Town 洛阳镇
- Town
- Location in Guangdong.
- Coordinates: 24°40′42″N 113°03′19″E
- Country: People's Republic of China
- Province: Guangdong
- Prefecture-level city: Shaoguan
- Autonomous county: Ruyuan Yao Autonomous County
- Designated (town): 1993

Area
  - Total: 588.25 km^{2} (227.12 sq mi)

Population (2018)
  - Total: 10,411
  - Density: 17.698/km^{2} (45.838/sq mi)
- Time zone: UTC+08:00 (China Standard)
- Postal code: 512725
- Area code: 0751

Luoyang (simplified Chinese: 洛阳镇; traditional Chinese: 洛陽鎮; pinyin: Luòyáng Zhèn) is a town in Ruyuan Yao Autonomous County, Guangdong, China. As of the 2018 census it had a population of 10,411 and an area of 588.25-square-kilometre (227.12 sq mi).

== Administrative division ==
As of 2016, the town is divided into one community and twelve villages:

- Yangsheng Community (阳升社区)
- Luoyang (洛阳村)
- Shendong (深洞村)
- Pingxi (坪溪村)
- Tianluokeng (田螺坑村)
- Banxing (半星村)
- Baizhu (白竹村)
- Banchang (板长村)
- Shuangping (双坪村)
- Gumudong (古母洞村)
- Futang (富塘村)
- Yueping (月坪村)
- Yuejie (月街村)

== History ==
It was formed as a township in 1986. In 1993, it was upgraded to a town. In 2005, Gumushui Town (古母水镇) merged into the town.

== Geography ==
The town is situated at northwestern Ruyuan Yao Autonomous County. The town is bordered to the north by the National Forest Park of Nanling Ridge, to the east by Dongping, Dabu and Wujiang District, to the south by Yingde and Qingyuan, and to the west by Yangshan County.

The Boluo River, a tributary of the Bei River, passes through the town.

The Tianjingshan National Forest Park is located in the town.

The town is in the subtropical monsoon mountain climate zone, with an average annual temperature of 16.5 °C (61.7 °F), total annual rainfall of 2,249-millimetre (88.5 in), and annual average sunshine hours in 1270 hours.

== Economy ==
The local economy is primarily based upon agriculture and local industry.

The region abounds with potassium and silicon.

== Demographics ==
Population census
Year	Pop.	±%
2007	11,038	—
2018	10,411	−5.7%

As of 2018, the National Bureau of Statistics of China estimates the township's population now to be 10,411.

== Transportation ==
The National Highway G323 winds through the town.
