= Indigenous mapping =

Indigenous mapping is a practice where Indigenous communities own, control, access, and possess both the geographic information and mapping processes. It is based on Indigenous data sovereignty and intellectual property.

Indigenous cartographers tend to employ different strategies than colony-focused or empire-focused cartographers. Indigenous cartography may focus on stories, ever-changing landscapes, and traditional knowledge.

Modern Indigenous mapping is closely associated with decolonization. It can reclaim traditional land names and spaces, including sacred areas.

== Examples ==
An example of an Indigenous map is a 2.6-meter long Ojibwe scroll and story detailing the 14th-15th century emigration of the Ojibwe people. It tracks the tribe's journey their original territory in the Zhiiwitaagani-gichigami (Atlantic Ocean) to the Nayaano-nibiimaang Gichigamiin (Great Lakes). The story uses symbols, such as bird migration and a bear carrying a pack of life and coming across different lakes with his tongue, to portray geographic locations including the St. Lawrence River to Montreal, the Lachine Rapids to Mattawa, the French River to Lake Huron, through the Straits of Mackinac to Sault Ste. Marie. The scroll was created and the story was retold by Eshkwaykeeshik (James Red Sky).

== See also ==
- Indigenous land rights
- Indigenous language
- Indigenous rights
- Indigenous title
- Language revitalization
