= DABUS =

Artificial intelligence system created by Stephen Thaler

DABUS (Device for the Autonomous Bootstrapping of Unified Sentience) is an artificial intelligence (AI) system created by Stephen Thaler. It reportedly conceived of two novel products — a food container constructed using fractal geometry, which enables rapid reheating, and a flashing beacon for attracting attention in an emergency. The filing of patent applications designating DABUS as inventor has led to decisions by patent offices and courts on whether a patent can be granted for an invention reportedly made by an AI system.

== History in different jurisdictions ==
=== Australia ===
On 17 September 2019, Thaler filed an application to patent a "Food container and devices and methods for attracting enhanced attention," naming DABUS as the inventor. On 21 September 2020, IP Australia found that section 15(1) of the Patents Act 1990 (Cth) is inconsistent with an artificial intelligence machine being treated as an inventor, and Thaler's application had lapsed. Thaler sought judicial review, and on 30 July 2021, the Federal Court set aside IP Australia's decision and ordered IP Australia to reconsider the application. On 13 April 2022, the Full Court of the Federal Court set aside that decision, holding that only a natural person can be an inventor for the purposes of the Patents Act 1990 (Cth) and the Patents Regulations 1991 (Cth), and that such an inventor must be identified for any person to be entitled to a grant of a patent. On 11 November 2022, Thaler was refused special leave to appeal to the High Court.

=== European Patent Office ===
On 17 October 2018 and 7 November 2018, Thaler filed two European patent applications with the European Patent Office. The first claimed invention was a "Food Container" and the second was "Devices and Methods for Attracting Enhanced Attention."

On 27 January 2020, the EPO rejected the applications on the grounds that the application listed an AI system named DABUS, and not a human, as the inventor, based on Article 81 and Rule 19(1) of the European Patent Convention (EPC).

On 21 December 2021, the Board of Appeal of the EPO dismissed Thaler's appeal from the EPO's primary decision. The Board of Appeal confirmed that "under the EPC the designated inventor has to be a person with legal capacity. This is not merely an assumption on which the EPC was drafted. It is the ordinary meaning of the term inventor."

=== United Kingdom ===
Similar applications were filed by Thaler to the United Kingdom Intellectual Property Office on 17 October and 7 November 2018. The Office asked Thaler to file statements of inventorship and of right of grant to a patent (Patent Form 7) in respect of each invention within 16 months of the filing date. Thaler filed those forms naming DABUS as the inventor and explaining in some detail why he believed that machines should be regarded as inventors in the circumstances.

His application was rejected on the grounds that: (1) naming a machine as inventor did not meet the requirements of the Patents Act 1977; and (2) the IPO was not satisfied as to the manner in which Thaler had acquired rights that would otherwise vest in the inventor. Thaler was not satisfied with the decision and asked for a hearing before an official known as the "hearing officer". By a decision dated 4 December 2019 the hearing officer rejected Thaler's appeal.

Thaler appealed against the hearing officer's decision to the Patents Court (a specialist court within the Chancery Division of the High Court of England and Wales that determines patent disputes). On 21 September 2020, Mr Justice Marcus Smith upheld the decision of the hearing officer. On 21 September 2021, Thaler's further appeal to the Court of Appeal was dismissed by Arnold LJ and Laing LJ (Birss LJ dissenting).

On 20 December 2023, the UK Supreme Court dismissed a further appeal by Thaler. In its judgment, the court held that an "inventor" under the Patents Act 1977 must be a natural person.

=== United States ===
The patent applications on the inventions were refused by the USPTO, which held that only natural persons can be named as inventors in a patent application. Thaler first fought this result by filing a complaint under the Administrative Procedure Act alleging that the decision was "arbitrary, capricious, an abuse of discretion and not in accordance with the law; unsupported by substantial evidence, and in excess of Defendants’ statutory authority." A month later on August 19, 2019, Thaler filed a petition with the USPTO as allowed in 37 C.F.R. § 1.181 stating that DABUS should be the inventor. The judge and Thaler agreed in this case that Thaler himself is unable to receive the patent on behalf of DABUS. In their August 5, 2022, Thaler decision, the US Court of Appeals for the Federal Circuit affirmed that only a natural person could be an inventor, which means that the AI that invents any other type of invention is not addressed by the "who" mentioned in the legislation.

=== New Zealand ===
On January 31, 2022, the Intellectual Property Office of New Zealand (IPONZ) decided that a patent application (776029) filed by Stephen Thaler was void, on the basis that no inventor was identified on the patent application. IPONZ determined that DABUS could not be "an actual devisor of the invention" as required by the Patents Act 2013, and that this must be a natural person as held by the previous patent offices above. The High Court of New Zealand confirmed the decision in 2023.

=== South Africa ===
On 24 June 2021, the South African Companies and Intellectual Property Commission (CIPC) accepted Dr Thaler's Patent Cooperation Treaty, for a patent in respect of inventions generated by DABUS. In July 2021, the CIPC released a notice of issuance for the patent. It is the first patent granted for an AI invention.

=== Switzerland ===
On June 26, 2025, the Swiss Federal Administrative Court ruled that artificial intelligence systems such as DABUS cannot be listed as inventors in patent applications. The court upheld the existing practice of the Swiss Federal Institute of Intellectual Property (IPI), which requires that only natural persons can be recognized as inventors under Swiss patent law.

The case concerned a patent application, which sought to designate DABUS as the sole inventor of a food container designed with a fractal geometry to enhance heat distribution. The IPI had rejected the application, arguing that both the absence of a human inventor and the attribution of inventorship to an AI system were inadmissible. While the court dismissed Thaler's main request, it accepted a subsidiary request: if a human applicant recognizes and files a patent based on an AI-generated invention, that person may be considered the inventor. As a result, the application may proceed with Thaler listed as the inventor. The decision (B-2532/2024) can still be appealed to the Swiss Federal Supreme Court.
