= Terri Janke =

Australian lawyer

Dr Terri Janke
- Terri Janke, 2026
- Born: Cairns, Queensland
- Occupations: Lawyer; writer
- Known for: Indigenous intellectual property expert

Dr Terri Janke is an Indigenous Australian lawyer of Wuthathi/Meriam heritage. She is considered a leading international authority on Indigenous cultural and intellectual property (ICIP), and is the solicitor director of Terri Janke and Company. Janke has written a number of books and articles, including True Tracks: Respecting Indigenous knowledge and culture.

== Early life and education ==
Janke was born in Cairns, Queensland, with Torres Strait Islander (Mer Island) and Aboriginal (Wuthathi) heritage, from Cape York Peninsula in North Queensland.

She graduated from the University of New South Wales (BA LLB) in 1995.

In 2019, Janke completed her PhD thesis at the Australian National University, entitled True Tracks: Indigenous Culture and Intellectual Property Principles for putting self-determination into Practice. She is also a graduate of the Australian Institute of Company Directors and LEADR Mediators. In 2021, Janke published a book based on her PhD entitled True Tracks: Respecting Indigenous Knowledge and Culture. The book is a resource for respecting Indigenous knowledge and culture, drawing on 20 years of work on the True Tracks principles.

== Career ==
Janke worked at the National Indigenous Arts Advocacy Association, where she assisted the legal team in the leading case Milpurrurru v Indofurn. Janke also worked as a legal consultant for the World Intellectual Property Organisation (WIPO) on the Pacific Traditional Knowledge Action Plan.

Janke is the solicitor director of Terri Janke and Company, a wholly Indigenous-owned legal firm that she founded in 2000. The firm specialises in Indigenous intellectual property, Indigenous cultural and intellectual property and business law. It is also the largest and oldest Indigenous law firm in Australia.

Janke is considered one of Australia's leading Indigenous lawyers, and an expert on Indigenous cultural and intellectual property (ICIP). She has written leading protocols and ICIP models for numerous industries including film, arts, museum and archival sectors.

Janke also serves on the boards of numerous organisations. She has served as deputy chair of the National Centre of Indigenous Excellence (Deputy Chair), a member of the board of Tourism Australia, the chair of the National Indigenous Television, the Ngalaya Indigenous Lawyers Association and the State Library of New South Wales.

In 2008, Janke was one of 1000 people invited by the Prime Minister to be a delegate at the Australia 2020 Summit aimed at discussing to discuss ten areas of critical importance to the country and developing a long-term strategy for Australia's future.

== Awards and recognition ==
Janke has received numerous awards and honours, including:

- 2011: NAIDOC Indigenous Person of the Year
- 2012: Australian Attorney-General's Indigenous Legal Professional of the Year, 2012
- 2013: Westpac/Australian Financial Review 100 Women of Influence
- 2019: Community Lawyer of the Year, Women Lawyers Association of NSW
- 2019: Indigenous Business Leader of the Year, MyBusiness Awards
- 2020: J.G. Crawford Prize at ANU, for her PhD thesis
- 2025: Australian National University Indigenous Alumnus of the Year
- 2025: Elected an Honorary Fellow of the Australian Academy of the Humanities

Janke has also been nominated for the following awards:

- 2007: Highly Commended, Law and Justice Foundation of NSW Aboriginal Justice Award
- 2015: Finalist, Telstra NSW Business Women's Awards
- 2015: Finalist, Indigenous Business, Ethnic Business Awards
- 2018: Finalist, NSW Regional Business Awards, City of Sydney
- 2019: Community Lawyer of the Year, Women Lawyers Association of NSW
- 2022: Shortlisted, New South Wales Premier's Literary Awards Indigenous Writers' Prize for True Tracks

== Selected publications ==
Alongside with writing ICIP protocols and models for various sectors, Janke has also produced publications on the effect of the law on Indigenous peoples and culture, many commissioned by government and NGOs.

=== Papers, reports and books ===
- Janke, Terri, True Tracks: Respecting Indigenous knowledge and culture (NewSouth, 2021)
- Janke, Terri, True Tracks: Indigenous cultural and intellectual property principles for putting self-determination into practice (Thesis (PhD), 2019)
- Janke, Terri and Maiko Sentina, ‘Indigenous Knowledge: Issues for protection and management’ (Discussion Paper, IP Australia & Department of Industry, Innovation and Science, 2018).
- Janke, Terri and Sarah Grant, First Peoples: A Roadmap for Enhancing Indigenous Engagement in Museums and Galleries (Australian Museums and Galleries Association, 2018).
- Janke, Terri and Maiko Sentina, Indigenous Joint Ventures Information Guide (Indigenous Business Australia, 6 April 2018).
- Janke, Terri and Lucinda Edwards, Indigenous cultural rights and engagement policy (National Museum of Australia, 2015).
- Terri Janke and Company, Law Way: Indigenous Business and the Law (2013).
- Janke, Terri, The Mabo Oration 2011: Follow the stars: Indigenous culture, knowledge and intellectual property rights (Anti-Discrimination Commission Queensland, 2011).
- Janke, Terri, Pathways & Protocols: A filmmaker’s guide to working with Indigenous people, culture and concepts (Screen Australia, 2009).
- Janke, Terri, Beyond Guarding Ground: a Vision for a National Indigenous Cultural Authority (Terri Janke and Company, 2009).
- Janke, Terri, Code of Practice for Galleries and Retailers of Indigenous Art (City of Melbourne, 2007).
- Terri Janke and Company, Protocols for Working with Indigenous Artists (Australia Council for the Arts, 2007).
- Jenke, Terri, Butterfly Song (Penguin Australia, 2005)
- Janke, Terri, Minding Culture: Case Studies on Intellectual Property and Traditional Cultural Expressions (World Intellectual Property Organisation, 2003).
- Mellor, Doreen and Terri Janke, Valuing Art, Respecting Culture – Protocols for Working with the Indigenous Visual Arts and Craft Sector (National Association for the Visual Arts, 2001).
- Janke, Terri, Our Culture: Our Future – Report on Australian Indigenous Cultural and Intellectual Property Rights (Report commissioned by the Australian Institute of Aboriginal and Torres Strait Islander Studies, Michael Frankel & Company, 1998).

=== Journal articles and chapters in books ===
- Janke, Terri, 'The Streets of My Youth' (2018), Growing Up Aboriginal In Australia
- Janke, Terri, ‘Protecting Indigenous Cultural Expressions in Australia and New Zealand: Two Decades After the Mataatua Declaration and Our Culture, Our Future’ (2018) 114 Intellectual Property Forum 21–30.
- Janke, Terri, ‘From smokebush to spinifex: Towards recognition of Indigenous knowledge in the commercialisation of plants’ (2018) 1 International Journal of Rural Law and Policy 1-27.
- Janke, Terri, ‘Ensuring Ethical Collaborations in Indigenous Arts and Records Management’ (2017) 91(5) Australian Law Journal 375-380.
- Janke, Terri, ‘Guarding ground: A vision for a national Indigenous cultural authority’ in Robert Tonkinson (ed), The Wentworth Lectures: Honouring fifty years of Australian Indigenous Studies (Aboriginal Studies Press, 2015) 258–280.
- Janke, Terri and Sarah Holcombe, ‘Patenting the Kakadu Plum and the Marjarla Tree: Biodiscovery, intellectual Property and Indigenous Knowledge’ in Matthew Rimmer and Alison McLennan (eds), Intellectual Property and Emerging Technologies: The New Biology (Edward Elgar, 2012) 293-319.
- Janke, Terri, ‘Copyright, Connections and Culture: Is there a place in the Australian arts industry for a National Indigenous Cultural Authority?’ in Courageous Conversations (Wilin Centre for Indigenous Arts and Cultural Development, 2010) 11-16.
- Janke, Terri, ‘Looking Out for Culture: Indigenous arts and cultural expression and copyright, trademarks and designs’ (2004) 26 Ngoonjook: Journal of Australian Indigenous Issues 73.
- Janke, Terri, ‘Respecting Indigenous Cultural and Intellectual Property Rights’ (1999) 22(2) University of New South Wales Law Journal 631.

== Personal life ==
Janke married Andrew Pitt and has two children.
