= Alice Tay =

Professor Alice Erh-Soon Tay AM FASSA

President of the Human Rights and Equal Opportunity Commission
- In office 1998–2003
- Preceded by: Sir Ronald Wilson
- Succeeded by: John von Doussa

Personal details
- Born: 1934 Singapore
- Died: 26 April 2004 (aged 69–70) Longueville, New South Wales, Australia

Alice Erh-Soon Tay AM FASSA (1934–2004) was an Australian academic lawyer, an eminent jurisprudence and comparative law scholar. She was president of the Australian Human Rights and Equal Opportunity Commission from 1998 to 2003.

== Early life and education ==
Tay was born in Singapore in 1934. She was admitted to the Singapore Bar in 1957 and practiced as a criminal lawyer. In 1959 she moved to the new law department at the University of Malaya (now the National University of Singapore). She moved to Australia in 1961. Four years later she obtained her PhD from the Australian National University.

== Professional career ==
Tay had a long academic career at the University of Sydney, with 26 years as the Challis Professor of Jurisprudence from 1975. She was a part-time Commissioner of the Australian Law Reform Commission from 1982 to 1987. During her time at the ALRC, she contributed to several major inquiries — including The Recognition of Aboriginal Customary Laws (ALRC 31, 1986); Privacy (ALRC 22, 1983); Contempt (ALRC 35, 1987) and Matrimonial Property (ALRC 39, 1987). In 1985, Tay was made a Member of the Order of Australia, for her contributions to teaching and research in law. She was elected a Fellow of the Academy of the Social Sciences in Australia in 1986 and was awarded an LLD (honoris causa) from the University of Edinburgh in 1989.

== Personal life ==
Tay married political philosopher and Marxist scholar Eugene Kamenka after her arrival in Australia. He died in 1994 and she remarried Guenther Doeker-Mach. She died in Longueville, Sydney on 26 April 2004.

== Tributes ==
A street in the Canberra suburb of Watson is named after her. The gazetted notice of the ACT Government noted her role in "court interventions regarding the MV Tampa".

The Annual Alice Tay Lecture in Law and Human Rights was established in 2005 by the Herbert and Valmae Freilich Foundation at the Australian National University. This lecture was established to acknowledge both Tay's championship of human rights in Australia and her contributions as a member of the Foundation's board over a number of years.

Legal offices
Preceded by Sir Ronald Wilson	President of the Australian Human Rights and Equal Opportunity Commission; 1998–2003	Succeeded by John von Doussa
