= Australian Museums and Galleries Association =

National peak body for museums and art galleries

Australian Museums and Galleries Association (AMaGA)
- Founded: 6 June 1992 (incorporation)
- Type: Peak council; central profession body; incorporated association
- VAT ID no.: ABN 83 048 139 955
- Registration no.: A02074 (Associations Incorporation Act 1991 (ACT))
- Location: Canberra, Australia
- Origins: Merger of: Council of Australian Museums Associations, Museums Association of Australia, Art Museums Association of Australia, and Museum Education Association of Australia
- Region served: Australia
- Website: www.amaga.org.au
- Formerly called: Museums Australia; Museums Galleries Australia

Museums Galleries Australia Magazine
- Categories: Museum administration
- Frequency: Biannual
- Publisher: Australian Museums and Galleries Association
- First issue: 2016 (predecessor 1992)
- Country: Australia
- Language: English
- ISSN: 2207-1806
- OCLC: 964444361

The Australian Museums and Galleries Association (AMaGA), formerly Museums Galleries Australia and Museums Australia, is the national professional organisation and peak council for museums and public art galleries in Australia. It advocates for the sector and provides a range of professional services to its members at a national, state and interest group level.

Museums Australia was established on 1 January 1994 by a national amalgamation of four museums associations: the Council of Australian Museums Associations, the Museums Association of Australia, the Art Museums Association of Australia, and the Museum Education Association of Australia. It changed its name to Museums Australia in 2014/15, and then to the Australian Museums and Galleries Association in 2018.

AMaGA publishes a biannual journal, Museums Galleries Australia Magazine.

== Description ==
As a national advocacy body, the organisation provides professional development and training opportunities, newsletters and representation. Members represent a wide range of national, state, regional and community museums, galleries, historic sites, botanic gardens and zoos, research centres and Australian Indigenous cultural centres. There are branches in every state and territory, and membership is open to both organisations of any size or type and individuals, both professional and volunteer.

== History ==
In 1937, the Art Galleries' and Museums' Association of Australia and New Zealand held its inaugural meeting in Auckland. This single organisation represented not-for-profit art galleries and museums in Australia and New Zealand. In 1948, the art galleries dissociated and the resultant Museums Association of Australia covered only science and history museums.

Failed attempts to create a single national body were made in the 1960s and 1970s. In 1981, the Council of Australian Museum Associations (CAMA) was formed to foster amalgamation but CAMA was under-resourced for that task until the 1990s. At that time there were three major museums organisations in Australia: the Art Museums Association, the Museums Association and CAMA.

The pooling of meagre resources was one impetus towards amalgamation but there was also a pressing need to set uniform standards for museums in relation to artists' moral rights, museum ethics, cultural heritage export restrictions and conservation.

In 1993, the executive officer of the Council of Australian Museum Associations, Greg Marginson, authored "Amalgamation : unity and diversity : the path towards a united museums' association for Australia", which estimated that there were around 1,900 museums in Australia with their professional wants and needs represented by at least 22 different organisations. He reported that Commonwealth and State government funding bodies were confused and frustrated by the lack of a central point of contact with the museum sector and profession. At that time there were 12 programs training museum professionals and CAMA saw a need for a single national body to ensure uniform museum studies curriculums and accreditation.

On 1 January 1994, Museums Australia was formed by the amalgamation of the Council of Australian Museums Associations, the Museums Association of Australia, the Art Museums Association of Australia, and Museum Education Association of Australia.

In 2014–15 Museums Australia rebranded itself as Museums Galleries Australia, and from 2018 it has been called Australian Museums and Galleries Association (AMaGA).

== National networks ==
National networks, which are divisions AMaGA's organisational structure with a committee and reporting responsibilities, consist of groups of members with shared interests of work in particular areas of professional practice.

The Performing Arts Heritage Network (PAHN) has a wide range of institutions at both state and national levels as members, with a focus on conserving the heritage of the performing arts. This group, headed by Jenny Fewster of the AusStage project at Flinders University, contributes as a partner to the project.

Other national networks include Art Craft Design, Aviation Museums, Education, Historians and Evaluation and Visitor Research.

== MAGNA and MAPDA awards ==
The Museums & Galleries National Awards (MAGNAs) were established in 2011, and aim to "recognise excellent work nationally in the categories of exhibition, public programs and sustainability projects". Entry is open to all Australian members of AMaGA, apart from the Indigenous Programs category and entrants which are keeping places (Aboriginal community-managed places for the safekeeping of repatriated and other cultural material); these are open to all. The other categories are (as of 2021): Permanent Exhibition or Gallery Fitout; Temporary/Travelling Exhibition; Interpretation, Learning and Audience Engagement; Rapid Response Collecting Project; and Research.

The Museums Australasia Multimedia & Publication Design Awards (MAPDAs), which were established in 1994, focus on design and communication, and as of 2021 have 17 categories.

== Publications ==
=== Journal ===
The Council of Australian Museum Association published the magazine Museum National from 1992, and Museums Australia continued to publish under this name from 1994 until 2003.

From 2003 it became Museums Australia.

In 2016, the journal became Museums Galleries Australia Magazine, published electronically and in hardcopy. As of 2019, the cover name as shown in their shop catalogue is Museums Galleries Australia Magazine, published bi-annually.

=== Conference proceedings ===
- 1994–1999:
  - Identity, icons and artefacts, proceedings of the inaugural Museums Australia Conference, Fremantle, November 1994
  - Communicating cultures, conference proceedings, Museums Australia Second Annual Conference, Brisbane, 21–25 November 1995
  - Tragedy and the museum: Port Arthur, collection of papers presented to Museums Australia 3rd Conference, Sydney, 1996
  - Unlocking Museums, the proceedings 4th National Conference of Museums Australia Inc, Darwin, Northern Territory, 1997
  - Fringe benefits : program handbook : community, culture communication, Albury Convention & Performing Arts Centre, May 5 to 9, 1999, 5th Annual Conference of Museums Australia
- 2001, 2002, 2003, 2006, 2007, 2010: Museums Australia National Conference proceedings: electronic archive of conference proceedings at National Library of Australia.
- 2001–2007: List of papers presented (to be online in the future) at annual conferences within these years (no conference 2008).
- 2009–2019 (or current year): conference videos, handbooks, programs, proceedings.

=== Annual reports ===
Annual reports since 2011 are published online.

=== Other publications ===
The various state branches and national networks (formerly called special interest groups) also produce newsletters, conference proceedings and other publications.

Among its many other publications are:

- Code of ethics for art, history & science museums (1994; 1997 3rd ed.)
- Previous possessions, new obligations : a plain English summary of policies for museums in Australia and Aboriginal and Torres Strait Islander peoples (1996)
- The exhibition handbook : a practical guide for organising exhibitions in Australian museums, galleries, libraries and community centres (1997)
- The Resources directory for the museum community (1998)
- Caring for our culture : national guidelines for museums, galleries and keeping places (1998)
- Taking the time : museums and galleries, cultural protocols and communities : a resource guide (1998)
- Continuous cultures, ongoing responsibilities : principles and guidelines for Australian museums working with Aboriginal and Torres Strait Islander cultural heritage (2005)
- Exhibitions : a practical guide for small museums and galleries (2007)
- Exhibition design for galleries and museums : an insider's view (2010)
- Museum methods : a practical manual for managing small museums and galleries (1994; 2nd ed. 2002)
- Terri Janke & Company. First Peoples : a roadmap for enhancing Indigenous engagement in museums and galleries : Indigenous roadmap (2019; available as PDF)
