= Indigenous intellectual property =

Collective legal protections for cultural heritage

Indigenous intellectual property is a term used in national and international forums to describe intellectual property held to be collectively owned by various Indigenous peoples, and by extension, their legal rights to protect specific such property. This property includes cultural knowledge of their groups and many aspects of their cultural heritage and knowledge, including that held in oral history. In Australia, the term Indigenous cultural and intellectual property, abbreviated as ICIP, is commonly used.

There have been various efforts made since the late 20th century towards providing some kind of legal protection for indigenous intellectual property in colonized countries, including a number of declarations made by various conventions of Indigenous peoples. The World Intellectual Property Organization (WIPO) was created in 1970 to promote and protect intellectual property across the world by cooperating with countries as well as international organizations. The UN's Declaration on the Rights of Indigenous Peoples (UNDRIP), passed by the General Assembly in 2007 with 143 countries in favour, includes several clauses relating specifically to the protection of intellectual property of Indigenous peoples.

Disputes around indigenous intellectual property include several cases involving the Māori people of New Zealand.

== Background ==
Indigenous intellectual property is a concept that has developed as an analog to predominantly western concepts of intellectual property law, and has been promoted by the World Intellectual Property Organization (WIPO), as part of a broader effort by the United Nations (UN) to see the world's indigenous, intangible cultural heritage better valued and better protected against perceived, ongoing mistreatment, based on legal theories holding them to be inadequately covered by Western law.

Indigenous knowledge is an integral part of Indigenous cultural heritage. Knowledge about land, seas, places and associated songs, stories, social practices, and oral traditions are important assets for Indigenous communities. Transmitted from generation to generation, Indigenous knowledge is constantly reinterpreted by Indigenous people. Through the existence and transmission of this intangible cultural heritage, Indigenous people are able to associate with a communal identity

Indigenous intellectual property rights relate to the legal rights to protect specific such property, which includes cultural knowledge of their groups, aspects of their cultural heritage in the visual arts, literature, and performing arts, as well as science and traditional medicines. It may include knowledge held in oral history.

International bodies such as the UN have become involved in the issue, making more specific declarations that intellectual property also includes cultural property such as historical sites, artifacts, designs, language, ceremonies, and performing arts in addition to artwork and literature.

Nation states across the world have experienced difficulties reconciling local indigenous laws and cultural norms with a predominantly western legal system, in many cases leaving Indigenous peoples' individual and communal intellectual property rights largely unprotected.

The Native American Rights Fund (NARF) has set out several goals around treaty law and intellectual property, with board member Professor Rebecca Tsosie stressing the importance of these property rights being held collectively, not by individuals:

The long-term goal is to actually have a legal system, and certainly a treaty could do that, that acknowledges two things. Number one, it acknowledges that Indigenous peoples are peoples with a right to self-determination that includes governance rights over all property belonging to the Indigenous people. And, number two, it acknowledges that Indigenous cultural expressions are a form of intellectual property and that traditional knowledge is a form of intellectual property, but they are collective resources – so not any one individual can give away the rights to those resources. The tribal nations actually own them collectively.

== Terminology ==
A term used especially in Australia is "Indigenous cultural and intellectual property", abbreviated as ICIP with the term cultural heritage often applying to the same concept. The term "Indigenous Cultural and Intellectual Property Rights" is abbreviated as ICIPR.

=== Traditional cultural expressions ===
"Traditional cultural expressions" is a phrase used by WIPO to refer to "any form of artistic and literary expression in which traditional culture and knowledge are embodied. They are transmitted from one generation to the next, and include handmade textiles, paintings, stories, legends, ceremonies, music, songs, rhythms and dance".

"Traditional cultural expressions" can include designs and styles, which means that applying traditional Western-style international copyright laws – which apply to a specific work, rather than a style – can be problematic. Indigenous customary law often treats such concepts differently, and may apply restrictions upon the use of underlying styles and concepts.

== Declarations ==
A number of Native American and First Nations communities have issued tribal declarations over the past 35 years. In the lead up to and during the UN International Year for the World's Indigenous Peoples (1993), then during the following UN Decade of the World's Indigenous Peoples (1995–2004), a number of conferences of both Indigenous and non-Indigenous specialists were held in different parts of the world, resulting in a number of unified declarations and statements identifying, explaining, refining, and defining "indigenous intellectual property" though the legal weight of most has yet to be tested.

Since the 1970s, inter-tribal groups in North American have organized demonstrations against non-Native use of Native American cultural elements, such as the sale of products and services allegedly derived from Indigenous knowledge.

Traditional Elders Circle, October 1980

Before ceremonies and ceremonial knowledge were affirmed as protected intellectual property by the UN General Assembly, smaller coalitions of Indigenous cultural leaders met to issue declarations about protection of ceremonial knowledge. In 1980, spiritual leaders of the Northern Cheyenne, Navajo, Hopi, Muskogee, Chippewa-Cree, Haudenosaunee and Lakota Nations met on the Northern Cheyenne Reservation in Montana, and issued the Resolution of the 5th Annual Meeting of the Traditional Elders Circle, resolving that:

These [non-Native] individuals are gathering non-Indian people as followers who believe they are receiving instructions of the original people. We, the Elders and our representatives sitting in Council, give warning to these non-Indian followers that it is our understanding this is not a proper process, that the authority to carry these sacred objects is given by the people...

Belém, July 1988

The first international congress of the International Society of Ethnobiology involving scientists, environmentalists and Indigenous peoples met at Belém, Brazil. They identified themselves collectively as ethnobiologists, and announced that (amongst other matters) since "Indigenous cultures around the world are being disrupted and destroyed". The Declaration of Belém declared:

Mechanisms [ought to] be established by which Indigenous specialists are recognized as proper Authorities and are consulted in all programs affecting them, their resources and their environment...
Procedures must be developed to compensate native peoples for the utilization of their knowledge and their biological resources.

Kari-Oca Declaration, May 1992

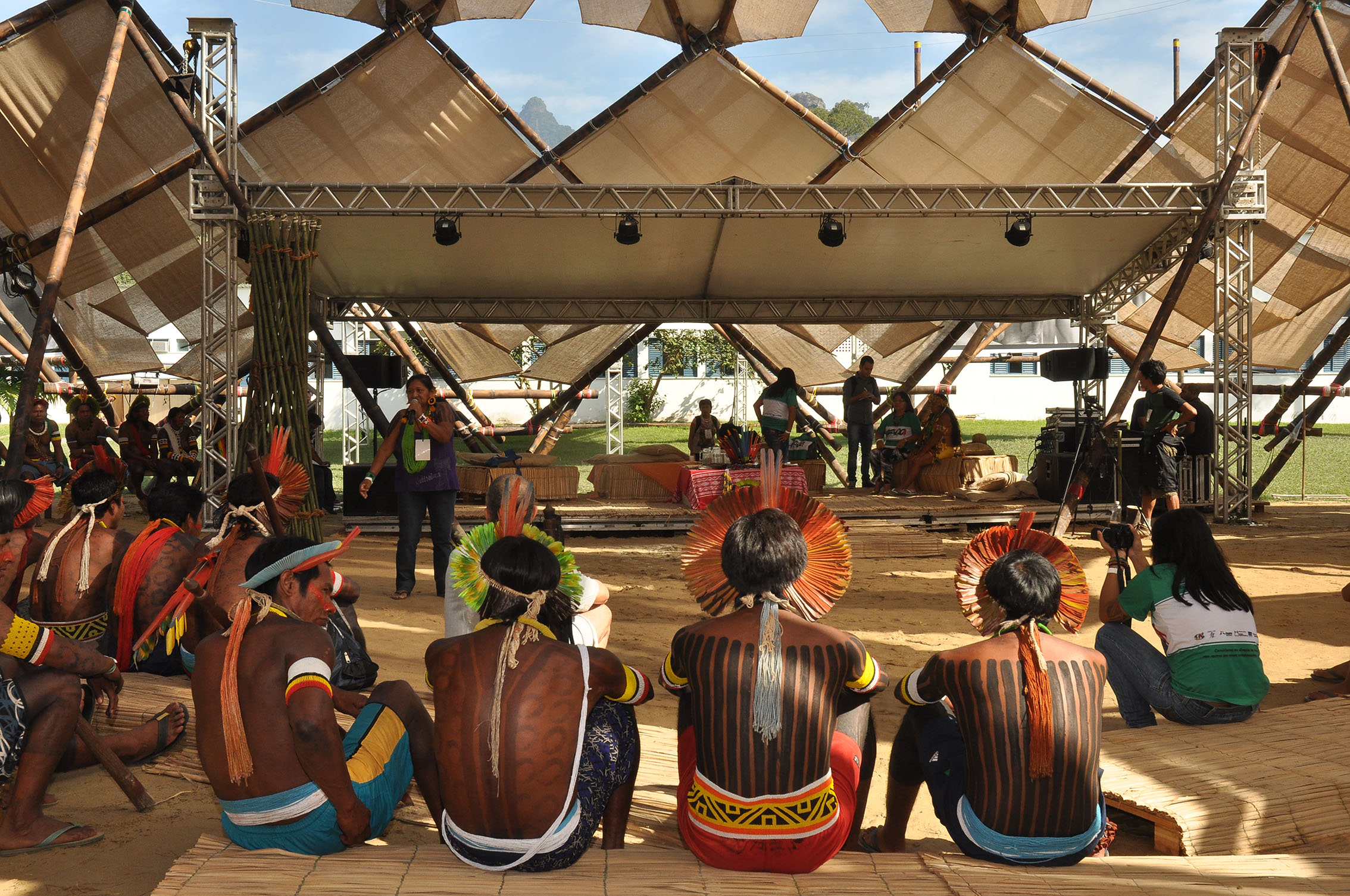
A meeting of members of the Kari-Oca Indigenous group

The Kari-Oca Declaration and Indigenous Peoples Earth Charter was first affirmed in Brazil in May 1992, and then re-affirmed in Indonesia in June 2002. Ratifying the document were Indigenous peoples from the Americas, Asia, Africa, Australia, Europe and the Pacific who, at Kari-Oca Villages, united in one voice to collectively express their serious concern at the way the world was exploiting the natural resources upon which Indigenous peoples depend.

Specific reference is made within the Indigenous Peoples Earth Charter to perceived abuses of Indigenous people's intellectual and cultural properties. Under the heading, "Culture, Science and Intellectual Property", among other matters, it is asserted:

99: The usurping of traditional medicines and knowledge from Indigenous peoples should be considered a crime against peoples...

102: As creators and carriers of civilizations which have given and continue to share knowledge, experience, and values with humanity, we require that our right to intellectual and cultural properties be guaranteed and that mechanisms for each be in favour of our peoples...

104: The protection, norms and mechanism of artistic and artisan creation of our peoples must be established and implemented in order to avoid plunder, plagiarism, undue exposure, and use...

Lakota declaration, June 1993

At the Lakota Summit V, an international gathering of US and Canadian Lakota, Dakota and Nakota Nations, about 500 representatives from 40 different tribes and bands of the Lakota unanimously passed a "Declaration of War Against Exploiters of Lakota Spirituality". Representatives affirmed a zero-tolerance policy on the exploitation of Lakota, Dakota and Nakota ceremonial knowledge:

Whereas we are conveners of an ongoing series of comprehensive forums on the abuse and exploitation of Lakota spirituality;...
6. We urge traditional people, tribal leaders, and governing councils of all other Indian Nations, as well as all national Indian organizations, to join us in calling for an immediate end to this rampant exploitation of our respective American Indian sacred traditions by issuing statements denouncing such abuse; for it is not the Lakota, Dakota and Nakota people alone whose spiritual practices are being systematically violated by non-Indians.

Mātaatua Declaration, June 1993

On 18 June 1993, 150 delegates from fourteen countries, including Indigenous representatives from Japan (Ainu), Australia, Cook Islands, Fiji, India, Panama, Peru, Philippines, Suriname, United States and Aotearoa (New Zealand) met at Whakatane (Bay of Plenty region of New Zealand). The assembly affirmed Indigenous peoples' knowledge is of benefit to all humanity; recognised Indigenous peoples are willing to offer their knowledge to all humanity provided their fundamental rights to define and control this knowledge is protected by the international community; insisted the first beneficiaries of Indigenous knowledge must be the direct Indigenous descendants of such knowledge; and declared all forms of exploitation of Indigenous knowledge must cease.

Under Section 2 of their declaration, the Mātaatua Declaration on Cultural and Intellectual Property Rights of Indigenous Peoples, they specifically ask state, national and international agencies to:

2.1: Recognise that Indigenous peoples are the guardians of their customary knowledge and have the right to protect and control dissemination of that knowledge.

2.2: Recognise that Indigenous peoples also have the right to create new knowledge based on cultural tradition.

2.3: Accept that the cultural and intellectual property rights of Indigenous peoples are vested with those who created them.

Julayinbul Statement, November 1993

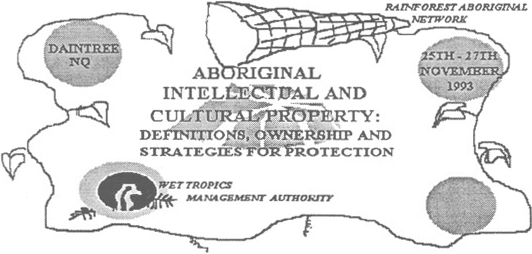
Julayinbul Aboriginal Intellectual Property Conference Logo (1993)

The Julayinbul Statement on Indigenous Intellectual Property Rights arose out of a meeting of Indigenous and non-Indigenous specialists, who, at Jingarrba, in north-eastern Australia, agreed Indigenous intellectual property rights are best determined from within the customary laws of the Indigenous groups' themselves. Within the declaration, Indigenous customary laws are (re)named 'Aboriginal common laws', and it is insisted these laws must be acknowledged and treated as equal to any other systems of law:

Aboriginal intellectual property, within Aboriginal Common Law, is an inherent, inalienable right which cannot be terminated, extinguished, or taken... Any use of the intellectual property of Aboriginal Nations and Peoples may only be done in accordance with Aboriginal Common Law, and any unauthorised use is strictly prohibited.

Hopi and Apache opt-out

In 1994 a number of Native American tribal organizations demanded that museums remove certain materials from exhibition and access to the public. They cited the Native American Graves Protection and Repatriation Act (NAGPRA) as the legal basis for these complaints. Their position was that they would only permit such uses selectively and with express permission of the living relatives of the human remains and grave goods the museums wished to exhibit. Vernon Masayesva, CEO of the Hopi Tribe, and a consortium of Apache tribes demanded a number of American museums end all public exhibition of, and access to, materials from their tribal cultures; including "images, text, ceremonies, music, songs, stories, symbols, beliefs, customs, ideas, concepts and ethnographic field-notes, feature films, historical works, and any other medium in which their culture may appear literally, imagined, expressed, parodied or embellished." Many Apache tribes such as the White Mountain Apache Tribe have also asked for the return of Puebloan artifacts and bodies that were taken off of their land by various collectors overtime.

Santa Cruz de la Sierra Statement, September 1994

A regional meeting was held at Santa Cruz de la Sierra, Bolivia, where Indigenous peoples from South America concerned about the way internationally prevailing intellectual property systems and regimes appeared to be favouring the appropriation of Indigenous peoples' knowledge and resources for commercial purposes, agreed in their Santa Cruz de la Sierra Statement on Intellectual Property:

For members of indigenous peoples, knowledge and determination of the use of resources are collective and intergenerational. No...individuals or communities, nor the Government, can sell or transfer ownership of [cultural] resources which are the property of the people and which each generation has an obligation to safeguard for the next...
There must be appropriate mechanisms for maintaining and ensuring the right of Indigenous peoples to deny indiscriminate access to the [cultural] resources of our communities or peoples and making it possible to contest patents or other exclusive rights to what is essentially Indigenous.

Tambunan Statement, February 1995

Indigenous people of Asia met at Tambunan, Sabah, East Malaysia, to assert rights of self-determination, and to express concern about, and fear of, the threat unfamiliar 'western' intellectual property rights systems may pose to them. It was agreed, in the Tambunan Statement on the Protection and Conservation of Indigenous Knowledge:

For the Indigenous peoples of Asia, the intellectual property rights system is not only a very new concept but it is also very western...[W]ith [western style] intellectual property rights, alien laws will be devised to exploit the Indigenous knowledge and [cultural] resources of the Indigenous peoples.

Suva Statement, April 1995

Participants from the independent countries and "nonautonomous colonised territories" of the Pacific region met in Suva, Fiji, to discuss internationally dominant intellectual property rights regimes, and at that meeting they resolved to support the Kari Oca, Mataatua, Julayinbul, Santa Cruz de la Sierra, and Tambunan initiatives(above). In their statement, the Suva Statement on Indigenous Peoples Knowledge and Intellectual Property Rights, participants:

Declare[d] Indigenous peoples are willing to share our knowledge with humanity provided we determine when, where and how it is used: at present the international system does not recognise or respect our past, present and potential contribution...

Seek[s] repatriation of Indigenous peoples [cultural] resources already held in external collections, and seek[s] compensation and royalties from commercial developments resulting from these resources

[Seek to] Strengthen the capacities of Indigenous peoples to maintain their oral traditions, and encourage initiatives by Indigenous peoples to record their knowledge... according to their customary access procedures.

Kimberley Declaration, August 2002

Indigenous people from around the world attended an international Indigenous peoples' summit on sustainable development in Khoi-San Territory, Kimberley, South Africa, in August 2002, where they reaffirmed previous declarations and statements (above), and, among other matters, declared:

Our traditional knowledge systems must be respected, promoted and protected; our collective intellectual property rights must be guaranteed and ensured. Our traditional knowledge is not in the public domain; it is collective, cultural and intellectual property protected under our customary law. Unauthorized use and misappropriation of traditional knowledge is theft.

=== UNDRIP, September 2007 ===
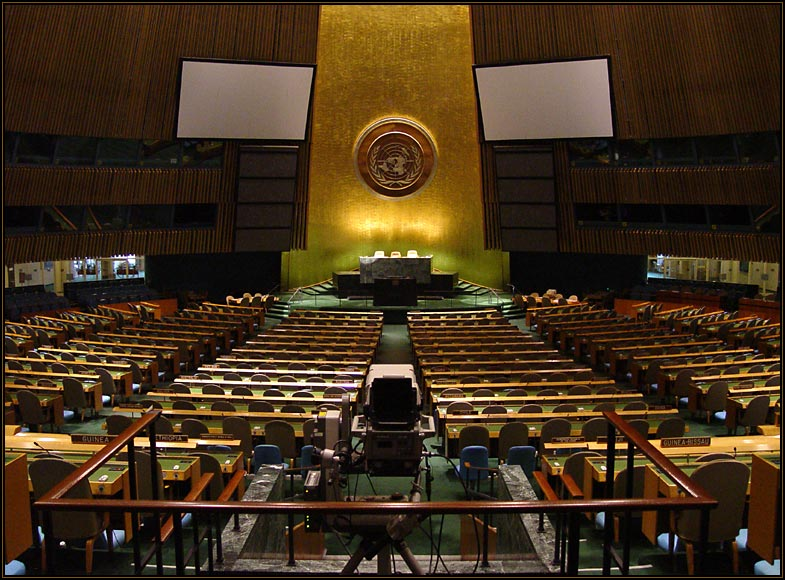
United Nations General Assembly 2003

At the United Nations General Assembly's 61st session, on 13 September 2007, an overwhelming majority of members resolved to adopt the UN Declaration on the Rights of Indigenous Peoples (UNDRIP), a legally non-binding resolution delineating and defining the individual and collective rights of Indigenous peoples. 144 states voted in favour, 4 against (Australia, Canada, New Zealand and the United States) and 11 countries abstained. The four dissenting countries reversed their positions some years later.

Some of UNDRIP's clauses relate to intellectual property of Indigenous peoples. The Declaration recognizes "the urgent need to respect and promote the inherent rights of Indigenous peoples which derive from their political, economic and social structures and from their cultures, spiritual traditions, histories and philosophies...;" reaffirms "...that indigenous peoples possess collective rights which are indispensable for their existence, well-being and integral development as peoples..." and proclaims as an agreed standard for member nations around the world:

- Article 11: Indigenous peoples have the right to practise and revitalize their cultural traditions and customs. This includes the right to maintain, protect and develop the past, present and future manifestations of their cultures, such as archaeological and historical sites, artefacts, designs, ceremonies, technologies and visual and performing arts and literature... States shall provide redress through effective mechanisms, which may include restitution, developed in conjunction with indigenous peoples, with respect to their cultural, intellectual, religious and spiritual property taken without their free, prior and informed consent or in violation of their laws, traditions and customs.
- Article 24: Indigenous peoples have the right to their traditional medicines and to maintain their health practices, including the conservation of their vital medicinal plants, animals and minerals...
- Article 31: Indigenous peoples have the right to maintain, control, protect and develop their cultural heritage, traditional knowledge and traditional cultural expressions, as well as the manifestations of their sciences, technologies and cultures, including human and genetic resources, seeds, medicines, knowledge of the properties of fauna and flora, oral traditions, literatures, designs, sports and traditional games and visual and performing arts. They also have the right to maintain, control, protect and develop their intellectual property over such cultural heritage, traditional knowledge, and traditional cultural expressions... In conjunction with indigenous peoples, States shall take effective measures to recognize and protect the exercise of these rights.

== Protocols, law and legal challenges by country ==
=== Australia ===
Australian law does not protect all forms of Indigenous cultural and intellectual property (ICIP). Copyright law in Australia covers music, literature and art by people who are living or have died within 70 years, and individual creators' work is also protected by moral rights. Performers' and designers' work are covered by separate legislation. In some instances, cultural misappropriation can be protected by the Competition and Consumer Act 2010, which was successfully tested in a 2019 court action against Birubi Art for concealing the fact that their "Aboriginal" artefacts for sale were made in Indonesia, and not by Aboriginal artists. The Federal Court of Australia ruled against the company on the basis that it had made misleading Indigenous art claims.

However, there are significant omissions in the legal framework, including:

- traditional Aboriginal medicines, known as bush medicine;
- underlying ideas or stories behind artworks;
- specific techniques in visual art, such as cross-hatching (rarrk) or dot painting;
- Aboriginal Australian languages and Torres Strait Island languages;
- unwritten dance or music;
- products or processes based on traditional methods of creation, such as basket-weaving or medicine.

There is also no law that prevents the misuse, distortion or alteration of ICIP that is communally owned (Indigenous communal moral rights, or ICMR). Because of the lack of complete protection by the legislative framework, some sectors and organisations have set up their own protocols:

The first edition of Protocols for using First Nations Cultural and Intellectual Property in the Arts was published by the Australia Council for the Arts, in 2002, with a revised edition published in 2007. A new edition was authored by Terri Janke in 2019. The document aims to help to provide protection of traditional knowledge by recognizing and engendering respect for customary practice, providing case studies spanning a wide variety of creations in the arts, and cites ten principles contained in the UN Declaration on the Rights of Indigenous Peoples (UNDRIP, see above). While it has no legal force, it explains the gaps in legislation, and "encourages culturally appropriate working practices and promotes communication between all Australians with an interest in Indigenous creative arts".

Among the many organizations to have published their own sets of protocols are the Government of New South Wales, National and State Libraries Australasia, Screen Australia and the University of Tasmania.

=== Philippines ===
The 1997 Indigenous Peoples Rights Act (IPRA; Republic Act No. 8371) has "Community Intellectual Rights" provisions which entitles Indigenous Cultural Communities/Indigenous Peoples (ICCs/IPs) to "the recognition of the full ownership and control and protection of their cultural and intellectual rights and that shall have the right to special measures to control, develop, and protect their sciences, technologies, and cultural manifestations, including but not limited to indigenous knowledge, systems, and practices, designs, and visual and performing arts". Use of such manifestations for commercial, tourism and advertisement purposes by a third-party needs Free and Prior Informed Consent (FPIC) from the ICC/IP concerned. The National Commission on Indigenous Peoples (NCIP) is the government agency responsible for verifying alleged FPICs.

=== New Zealand ===
The Intellectual Property Office of New Zealand is responsible for determining some types of intellectual property in New Zealand, specifically patent, trade mark, design and plant variety rights, while copyright law of New Zealand is administered by a different unit of the Ministry of Business, Innovation and Employment.

==== Māori Ka Mate haka ====
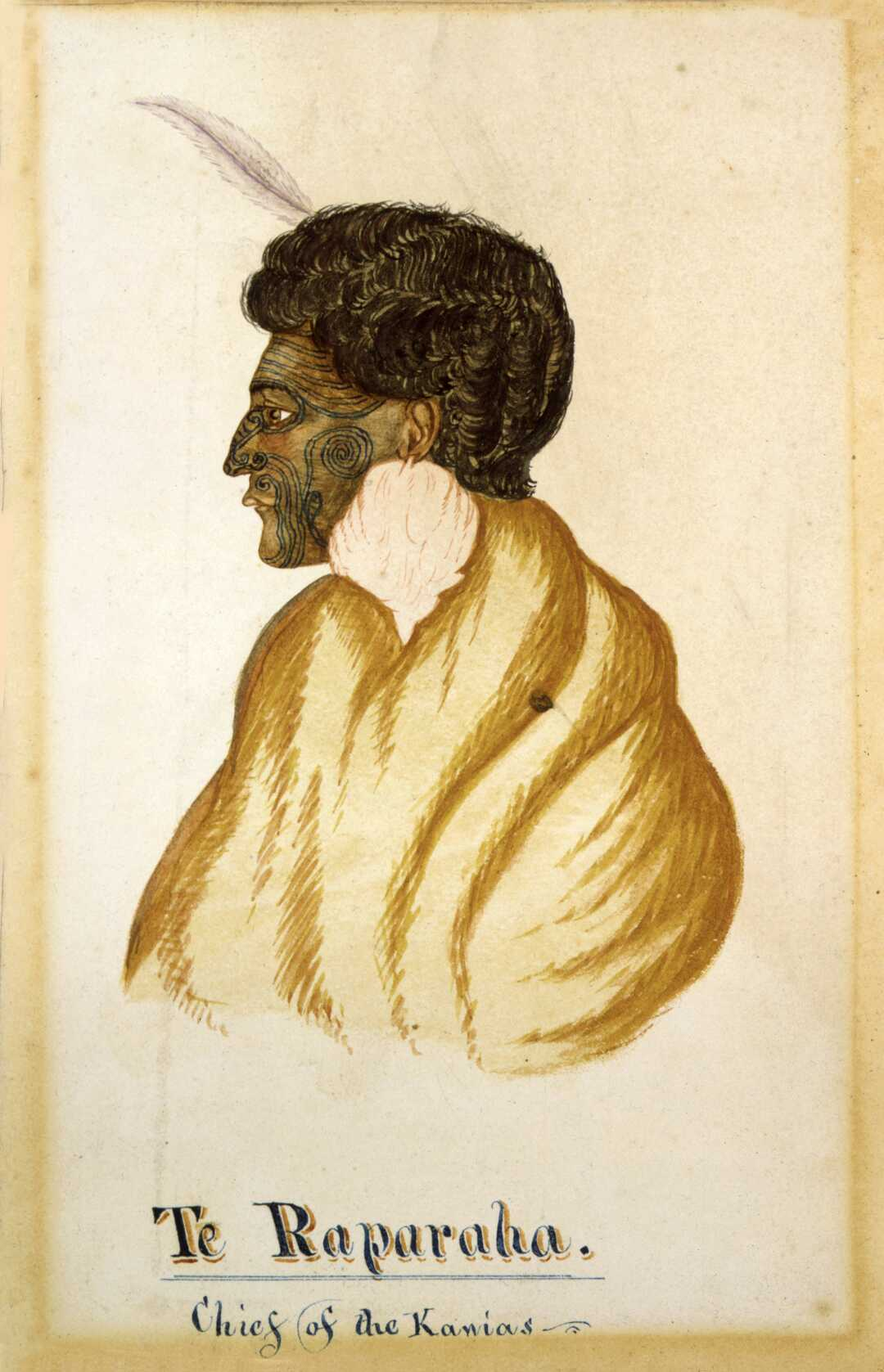
Te Rauparaha, composer of Ka Mate

Since the 19th century, Māori haka have been popularly used by New Zealanders as a cheer at sporting events; especially for New Zealand national teams. Between 1998 and 2006, the Ngāti Toa iwi attempted to trademark the Ka Mate haka and to forbid its use by commercial organisations without their permission. The Intellectual Property Office of New Zealand turned their claim down in 2006, since Ka Mate had achieved wide recognition in New Zealand and abroad as representing New Zealand as a whole and not a particular trader. In 2009, as a part of a wider settlement of grievances, the New Zealand government agreed to:

...record the authorship and significance of the haka Ka Mate to Ngāti Toa and ... work with Ngāti Toa to address their concerns with the haka... [but] does not expect that redress will result in royalties for the use of Ka Mate or provide Ngāti Toa with a veto on the performance of Ka Mate...

==== The Māori and Lego's Bionicle ====
In 2001 a dispute concerning the popular LEGO toy-line "Bionicle" arose between Danish toymaker Lego Group and several Māori tribal groups (fronted by lawyer Maui Solomon) and members of the online discussion forum (Aotearoa Cafe). The Bionicle product line allegedly used many words appropriated from Māori language, imagery and folklore. The dispute ended in an amicable settlement. Lego eventually agreed that it had taken the names from Māori and agreed to change certain names or spellings to help set the toy-line apart from the Māori legends.

==== "Māori" cigarettes ====
In 2005 a New Zealander in Jerusalem discovered that the Phillip Morris cigarette company had started producing a brand of cigarette in Israel called the "L & M Maori mix". In 2006, the head of Phillip Morris, Louis Camilleri, issued an apology to Māori: "We sincerely regret any discomfort that was caused to Māori people by our mistake and we won't be repeating it."

== Criticism ==
Critics of the movement for granting Indigenous Intellectual Property Rights note that the indefinite duration of such a context is "unorthodox and unmanageable" within the current IP legal structure.

Indigenous efforts to pursue intellectual property rights have been challenged by the issue of protecting both tangible and intangible cultural heritage. Protecting intangible cultural heritage also involves other aspects beyond financial and legal issues — pursuing intellectual property rights may not be enough to cover ethical, spiritual, and moral issues that arise. Policymakers are concerned with what to define indigenous knowledge as; similar to defining the concept of culture, it is difficult to concretely define and identify indigenous knowledge without reinforcing cultural stereotypes and prejudices.

== See also ==
- Biopiracy and Bioprospecting
- CARE Principles for Indigenous Data Governance
- Commercialization of indigenous knowledge
- Cultural appropriation
- Darrell A. Posey
- Decolonization of knowledge
- Indigenous communal moral rights
- Intangible Cultural Heritage
- Indigenous mapping
- Intellectual property
- Intellectual property issues in cultural heritage (IPinCH)
- Pretendian
- Traditional knowledge
- Tribal knowledge
