= AusStage =

Online database containing historical information on the performing arts in Australia

- Website type: Online database, information repository, relational database
- Available in: English
- Owner: Consortium of institutions headed by Flinders University
- Website: https://www.ausstage.edu.au/
- Commercial: No
- Launched: 2003 (prototype 2002)
- Current status: Online
- OCLC number: 855153043
- Dataset of live events in Australia since 1789, excluding music-only events.

AusStage: The Australian Live Performance Database is an online database which records information about live performances in Australia, providing records of productions from the first recorded performance in Australia (1789, by convicts) up until the present day. The only repository of Australian performing arts in the world, it is managed by a consortium of universities, government agencies, industry organisations and arts institutions, and mostly funded by the Australian Research Council. Created in 2000, the database contained more than 250,000 records by 2018.

== History ==
The AusStage project was instigated by the Australasian Drama Studies Association in 1999, with Flinders University in South Australia leading the project, funded by a grant from the Australian Research Council (ARC). Other collaborating universities were La Trobe University (Vic), University of Queensland, University of New South Wales, University of Western Australia, University of New England (NSW), Newcastle University, and Queensland University of Technology. In addition, the Australia Council, the Performing Arts Special Interest Group, and industry representative Playbox Theatre Company, Melbourne (later Malthouse) were initial collaborators. A prototype version of the database, known as The Event Database (TED), built for the Adelaide Festival Centre Trust by Joh Hartog and Julie Holledge (of Flinders) was launched in October 2002.

The purpose was to address a gap in accessible information about events and resources in the area of Australian theatre, drama and performance studies, by creating an online database of events in Australia, with indexes to access it, and also to provide a type of online catalog, or directory, of research resources of many types held across the country. The plan was to first combine existing data from the participating universities, and then expand over time, allowing for further data to be input.

In Phase 2, from 2003 to 2005, the project was expanded, with more funding from ARC and Curtin University joining the group. The database was reorganised and the interface improved, but the main effort was put into data entry, with the number of entries expanding from 7,000 to 35,000.

The project continued through several more phases, which included sub-projects on specific aspects, funded by various sources. In Phase 6 (2017-2018), the aim has been to build a visual interface, using new visualisation technologies and focusing on venues. During Phase 7 (2021-2022), AusStage focused on improving the user interface, adapting the schema to support policy analysis, and using VR to popularise performing arts research.

== Partners and collaborators ==
As of August 2019, partners in the project are the Association of Performing Arts Collections (APAC), Flinders University, University of Queensland, Deakin University, Griffith University, University of Melbourne, Edith Cowan University, La Trobe University, Monash University, QUT, the University of Newcastle, UNSW, University of Sydney, the Centre for Ibsen Studies at the University of Oslo in Norway, the Performing Arts Heritage Network (PAHN), and the State Theatre Company of South Australia.

Project advisors come from QPAC Museum, National Library of Australia (NLA), UNSW Library, the Performing Arts Collection of South Australia and the Performing Arts Collection at the Arts Centre in Melbourne.

Past partners, advisors and collaborators have included staff and/or funding from the University of Tasmania, University of Western Sydney, RMIT, Macquarie University, Murdoch University, the University of Ballarat, University of New England, University of Wollongong, Batchelor Institute of Indigenous Tertiary Education, NIDA, the Australia Council, Adelaide Festival Centre, Windmill Performing Arts. A large number of data entry staff is employed, with some based in the UK.

There is a small team of volunteers at the NLA who have been researching and adding data from the library's PROMPT Collection (digitised in Trove). The working group has also been going through the library's holdings of music and theatre ephemera, the J. C. Williamson Collections. Both the AusStage database and the J.C. Williamson Distributed Collection were added to the UNESCO Australian Memory of the World Register in 2021. (Note: The J.C. Williamson Distributed Collection is held across six organisations: the NLA; Australian Performing Arts Collection in Melbourne; Mitchell Library in Sydney; Queensland Performing Arts Centre Museum; Scenic Studios Australia Pty Ltd; and Seaborn, Broughton & Walford Foundation Archives and Library collection.)

== Content and description ==
The database provides records of productions from the beginnings of theatre in Australia up to today, searchable by playwright, venue, company, director and other categories. A team of people working around the country have indexed articles from journals such as the Australia and New Zealand Theatre Record as well as archived theatre programmes and other printed and electronic materials.

The first recorded theatre production staged in Australia, performed in the same year as the convict settlement was founded in Port Jackson, 1789, and put on by convicts in a hut, with Captain Arthur Phillip in the audience, is included in the database.

Coverage includes all performing arts events (including theatre, music, spoken word poetry, circus arts and other types) in Australia, venues, organisations, people, etc. Entry is either by browsing, or searching using the indexes, by event, person, organisation, venue, resource or work or any keyword. It also contains links to content about the performing arts in Australia in other places.

As of January 2018, AusStage contained more than 250,000 records, and has become a valuable resource for thousands of people who have an interest in researching Australian theatre companies, events, directors and things related with the performing arts.

As examples of its many uses, one researcher used AusStage to geographically map different corroboree performances in the 19th century, and then link these to specific tribal and language groups; another undertook a social network analysis of Australian performing artists, finding that there was only 3.6 degrees of separation between them.

In 2021, AusStage was welcomed to the UNESCO Memory of the World Register. The Australian Memory of the World Program describes it as unique in its coverage, and states "There is nothing comparable in the world, even in the UK or USA, at a national level".

== Funding ==
As of January 2018 AusStage had received funding from the Australian Research Council, the National eResearch Architecture Taskforce (Nectar), the Australian National Data Service (the latter two being divisions of the Australian Research Data Commons since 2018) and the Australian Access Federation, but as its size has grown, so has its costs. The managers do not want to make it a subscription-only database, as this would contravene the spirit of its creation. It has received major funding from the University of Melbourne Library, the University of Wollongong Library, the UNSW Library and Flinders’ Central Library, but as of 2018 it needed to raise A$200,00 per annum to maintain the resource, so additional donations by university libraries and individual donors were being sought.

== See also ==
- Flinders University AusStage Prize
- Internet Broadway Database
- Internet Off-Broadway Database
