= Dabu, Ruyuan County =

Dabu Town 大布镇
- Town
- Location in Guangdong.
- Coordinates: 24°32′25″N 113°08′23″E
- Country: People's Republic of China
- Province: Guangdong
- Prefecture-level city: Shaoguan
- Autonomous county: Ruyuan Yao Autonomous County

Area
  - Total: 220.26 km^{2} (85.04 sq mi)

Population (2018)
  - Total: 13,873
  - Density: 62.985/km^{2} (163.13/sq mi)
- Time zone: UTC+08:00 (China Standard)
- Postal code: 512723
- Area code: 0751

Dabu (simplified Chinese: 大布镇; traditional Chinese: 大布鎮; pinyin: Dàbù Zhèn) is a town in Ruyuan Yao Autonomous County, Guangdong, China. As of the 2018 census it had a population of 13,873 and an area of 220.26-square-kilometre (85.04 sq mi).

== Administrative division ==
As of 2016, the town is divided into one community and seven villages:

- Dabu Community (大布社区)
- Jiashui (夹水村)
- Yingming (英明村)
- Chengtou (埕头村)
- Baikeng (白坑村)
- Wulian (钨连村)
- Wuying (钨英村)
- Pingshan (坪山村)

== History ==
It was known as "Dabu Township" historically. In 1987, it was upgraded to a town.

== Geography ==
The town sits at the southern Ruyuan Yao Autonomous County. The town shares a border with Luoyang Town to the west and north, Wujiang District to the east, and Yingde to the south.

The Huangdong River (黄洞河) winds through the town.

地名 is in the subtropical monsoon climate zone, with an average annual temperature of 18.7 °C (65.7 °F), total annual rainfall of 1,995.6-millimetre (78.57 in), and a frost-free period of 286 days.

== Economy ==
The local economy is primarily based upon agriculture and local industry. The main crops are rice, peanut, bean and vegetable. Economic crops are mainly bamboo, pepper, and sweet potato.

The region abounds with tin, bismuth, tungsten, copper, pyrite, and manganese.

== Demographics ==
Population census
Year	Pop.	±%
2007	12,733	—
2018	13,873	+9.0%

As of 2018, the National Bureau of Statistics of China estimates the township's population now to be 13,873.

== Tourist attractions ==
The Ruyuan Grand Canyon (乳源大峡谷), also known as "Guangdong Grand Canyon", is a well-known scenic spot in Guangdong.

== Transportation ==
The Provincial Highway S258 passes across the western town.
