= John von Doussa =

Australian judge

The Honourable John von Doussa AO FAAL KC
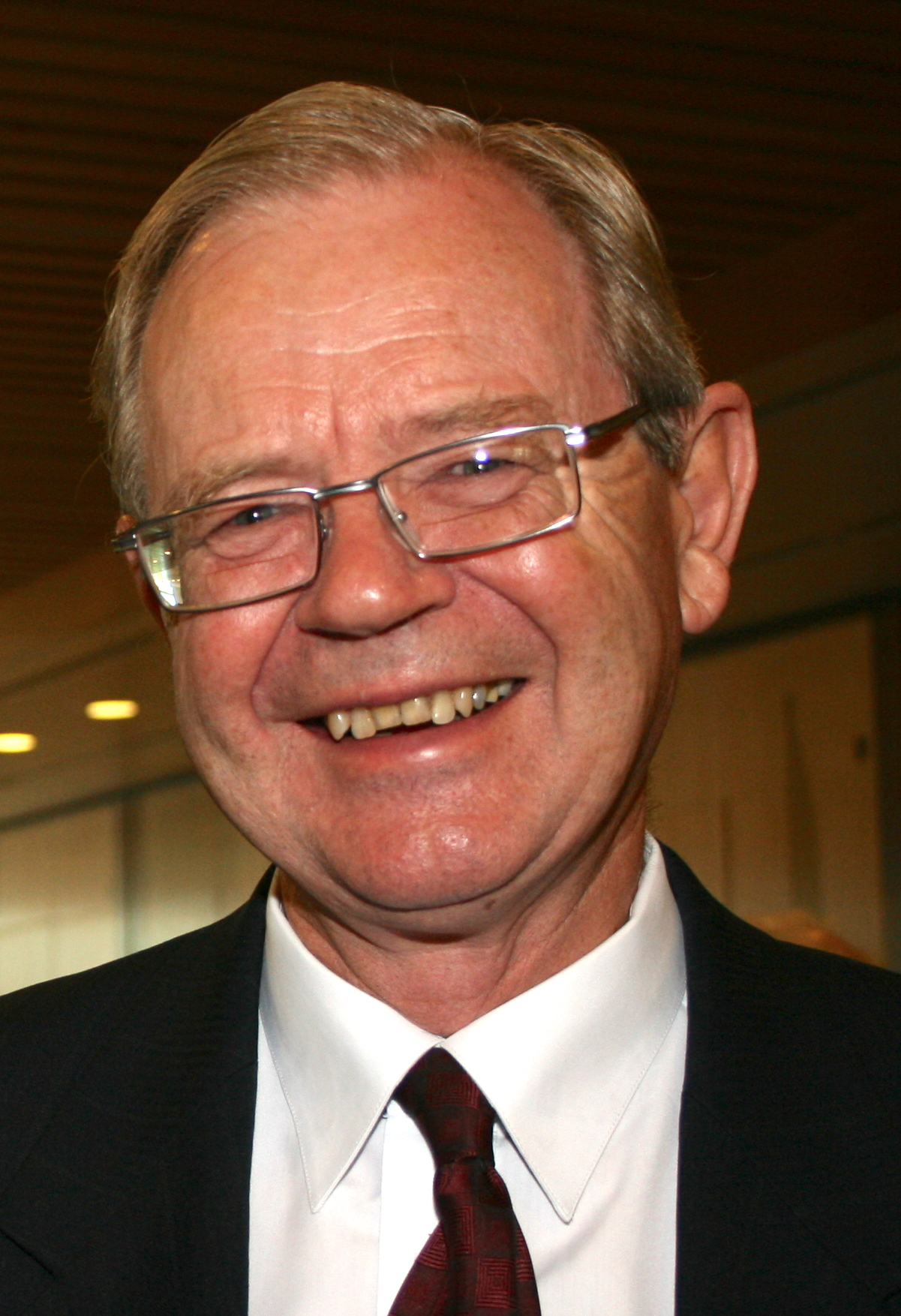
- Von Doussa in 2008

14th Chancellor of the University of Adelaide
- In office 2004–2010
- Deputy: Brian Croser; Ross Adler; Pamela Martin
- Preceded by: Robert Champion de Crespigny; Brian Croser (acting)
- Succeeded by: Robert Hill

President of the Human Rights and Equal Opportunity Commission
- In office 10 June 2003 – 8 September 2008
- Nominated by: John Howard
- Preceded by: Alice Tay
- Succeeded by: Catherine Branson

Judge of the Federal Court of Australia
- In office 1 December 1988 – 15 August 2003
- Nominated by: Bob Hawke

Judge of the Supreme Court of South Australia
- In office 14 August 1986 – 30 November 1988
- Nominated by: John Bannon
- Preceded by: Howard Zelling
- Succeeded by: Kevin Duggan

Personal details
- Born: 17 September 1940 (age 86)
- Education: St Peter's College, Adelaide
- Alma mater: University of Adelaide

The Hon. John William von Doussa AO FAAL KC (born 17 September 1940) is a former Australian judge and public servant. He was a judge of the Federal Court of Australia from 1988 to 2003, president of the Human Rights and Equal Opportunity Commission from 2003 to 2008, and chancellor of the University of Adelaide from 2004 to 2010.

== Early life ==
Von Doussa attended St Peter's College, Adelaide. He graduated from the University of Adelaide in 1962 with a Bachelor of Laws degree. He was "the fourth generation of his family to take up law", and is a great-grandson of Louis von Doussa.

== Legal and judicial career ==
Von Doussa served his articles of clerkship with Thomson, Hogarth, Ross & Lewis, and was called to the bar in 1963. He served as president of the Law Society of South Australia from 1982 to 1983, and became one of the state's most prominent barristers. In 1986, von Doussa was appointed to the Supreme Court of South Australia. He was elevated to the Federal Court of Australia in 1988, where he would serve until 2003.

In 1994, he presided over the landmark "Carpets Case", in which damages were awarded to a group of Aboriginal artists under the Copyright Act 1968 and Trade Practices Act after their rights to intellectual property were seen to have been infringed by a Perth import company which had used their designs on carpets manufactured in Vietnam.

In 2001, von Doussa delivered a controversial judgment related to the Hindmarsh Island bridge controversy. He held that he was "not satisfied that the restricted women's knowledge was fabricated or that it was not part of genuine Aboriginal tradition". His ruling directly contradicted the earlier findings of the Hindmarsh Island Royal Commission.

Von Doussa was made an additional judge on the Supreme Court of the Australian Capital Territory in 1989, a common appointment for Federal Court judges. He has also received appointments as a non-resident judge on the Court of Appeal of Vanuatu (1997), Supreme Court of Fiji (2003), and Supreme Court of Nauru (2010).

== Human Rights Commission ==
On 1 May 2003, it was announced that von Doussa would replace Alice Tay as President of the Human Rights and Equal Opportunity Commission, with effect from 10 June. For periods in 2006 and 2007, he was also acting Sex Discrimination Commissioner and acting Commissioner Responsible for Age Discrimination. Von Doussa retired from the commission at the end of his five-year term.

== Other activities ==
In July 2004, von Doussa was appointed Chancellor of the University of Adelaide (his alma mater), in place of Robert Champion de Crespigny. He served three two-year terms, retiring in 2010. The following year, he was awarded the honorary degree of Doctor of the University, the university's highest honour, by his successor as chancellor Robert Hill.

Legal offices
Preceded by Alice Tay AM	President of the Australian Human Rights and Equal Opportunity Commission; 2003–2008	Succeeded by Catherine Branson KC
