= Australian design law =

The Commonwealth of Australia's Designs Act 2003 replaced the Designs Act 1906. The legislation assists in the protection of the overall appearance of a product resulting from one or more visual features of the product. Although there are some overlaps, the Designs Act is not applicable when defending the functional innovations of a product. In common law, Firmagroup Australia Pty Ltd v Byrne & Davidson Doors (1987) 180 CLR 483, supports this. Firmagroup Australia Pty registered a design for a ‘combination handle and lock for shutter doors’. The innovative product was copied by Byrne & Davidson, and Firmagroup sued for infringement on design. The High Court held that the ‘combination handle and lock for shutter doors’ was ‘an idea of shape or configuration’, which is ‘conveyed by those features’, was ‘too general to attract statutory protection’. The Court then restricted the monopoly to the specific, individual appearance. Further, it added that ‘No design should be so construed as to give to its proprietor a monopoly in a method or principle of construction.’ The defendant proved to distinguish his product adequately, and thus did not infringe on Firmagroup's design.

== Definition of a design ==
Under the legislation, a design, in relation to a product, means the overall appearance of the product resulting from one or more visual features of the product. Further, the design is only a design, for the purposes of the Designs Act, when it is used in relation to the registered product. This illustrates that the registration of the design does not protect the business against the same design being used on other products; the pattern itself cannot be registered. In addition, the act covers both, two-dimensional designs (such as a logo on a cup), and three-dimensional designs (such as the shape of the cup). Furthermore, Dixon J, in Macrae Knitting Mills Ltd v Lowes Ltd (1936) 55 CLR 725, confirms that ‘The Act is concerned with shape and configuration, not function’. The Act, stipulates that a visual feature may, but need not, serve a functional purpose. However, if the design's every visual feature serves a functional purpose, then common law states that the design is not registrable.

Furthermore, the Designs Act states that should an innovation be both, a visual feature, and serve a functional purpose, there is nothing to stop the design being registered.

In common law, British Franco Electric Pty Ltd v Dowling Plastics Pty Ltd [1981] NSWLR 448, reinforces the view the courts take on the distinction between a function and a design. In the case, both companies entered into a business selling and manufacturing furniture castors. Dowling Plastics developed the castor, and British Franco registered the design. Soon after the joint venture broke up, Dowling Plastics continued the production of the castors. However, British Franco claimed that Dowling Plastics were infringing on British Franco's registered design. Dowling put forth an argument questioning the validity of the registration of the design, as the only novel feature of the castor served a functional purpose, and when the castor is assembled, the design would not be seen. The court held in favour of Dowling, however, they were not persuaded by the business's argument, ruling that the functional purpose of the article is irrelevant, when the design does not satisfy other requirements for registration.

== Definition of a ‘product’ ==
The act outlines, that a product is a thing that is manufactured or handmade. Further, even if a component part of a product is made separately from the product itself, for the purposes of the Designs Act, it is still a product. Even a kit made for assembly of a particular product, is that product.

When the issue came to designs that vary in their dimensions (such as roof guttering), the items are still considered products, as long as following conditions apply:

- a) A cross-section taken across any indefinite dimension is fixed or varies according to a regular pattern;
- b) All the dimensions remain in proportion
- c) The cross-sectional shape remains the same throughout, whether or not the dimensions of that shape vary according to a ratio or series of ratios;
- d) It has a pattern or ornamentation that repeats itself.

== Distinction between the design and the product ==
One of the deep-seated aspects of the Designs Act is the distinction between the idea of a product, and the design relating to that product. Thus, the designs act will not grant a monopoly to a business attempting to register a fundamental or essential form of a product.

This is supported by common law, in Dalgety Australia Operations Ltd v Seeley Nominees Pty Ltd (1985) 5 IPR 97, when the High Court held that the Designs Act does not give a monopoly to the trading of the article to which it is applied. For example, without a design, a chair would still be a chair, a fork would still be a fork, etc... Bollen, J, further clarified that

a design turns a chair into something more than a mere chair. It becomes a chair with a conception or suggestion about shape or configuration beyond the fundamental form of a chair

.

Thus, the case established that a fundamental form cannot be registered as a design.

== Component and spare parts ==
The Designs Act also caters for components and spare parts of a product. The Act provides a monopoly for a component part of a product, which it deems to be a product for the purposes of the act. However, The Designs Act does not provide clarity when the issue is regarding a fundamental nature of components and spare parts. It is deep-seated in legislation and common law, that if a product is a fundamental form or shape of a product, then the product cannot be registrable. Although the spare part is purely manufactured for the purpose of attaching to its larger counterpart, it is not clear if that is seen, by legislation and common law, as being dictated by a functional purpose. Further, in most cases, the designer of the spare part also had a number of potential shapes to choose from, thus the spare part cannot be the fundamental form, thus rendering the product registrable.

== When is a design registrable? ==
The design is registrable if it fits the following characteristics:

- a) The design is new
- b) The design is distinctive when compared to the prior art base for the design as it existed before the priority date of the design

== Design rights ==
After registration, the owner of the registered design owns a renewable monopoly for 5 years, and has the exclusive rights to :

- a) To make or offer to make a product, in relation to which the design is registered, which embodies the design; and
- b) To import such a product into Australia for sale, or for use for the purposes of any trade or business; and
- c) To sell, hire and otherwise dispose of, or offer to sell, hire or otherwise dispose of, such a product; and
- d) To use such a product in any way for the purpose of any trade or business; and
- e) To keep such a product for the purpose of doing any of the things mentioned in paragraph (c) or (d)
- f) To authorize another person to do any of the things mentioned in paragraph (a), (b), (c), (d) or (e)

== Infringement of designs ==
A person infringes a registered design if, during the term of registration of the design, and without the licence or authority of the registered owner of the design, the person:

- (a) makes or offers to make a product, in relation to which the design is registered, which embodies a design that is identical to, or substantially similar in overall impression to, the registered design; or
- (b) imports such a product into Australia for sale, or for use for the purposes of any trade or business; or
- (c) sells, hires or otherwise disposes of, or offers to sell, hire or otherwise dispose of, such a product; or
- (d) uses such a product in any way for the purposes of any trade or business; or
- (e) keeps such a product for the purpose of doing any of the things mentioned in paragraph (c) or (d)

== Identical or substantially similar in overall impression ==
In subsection (a), the section mentions a design that is identical to, or substantially similar in overall impression. While the test for the design being identical is uncomplicated, to determine whether the design is substantially similar in overall impression and how it is substantially similar, the act refers to s19. The section stipulates that the court pay more attention to the similarities rather than the differences, must have regard for prior art base, and contextualize a certain part of the design that is similar, in relation to the whole design. The court must then apply the standard of a person who is familiar with the product to which the design relates, or products similar to the product to which the design relates. The Act does not require any party to establish that the registered design was copied, the mere registration of the design, protects against independent creation.

== Defences ==
If the defendant is repairing a complex product that has at least two replaceable component parts, permitting disassembly and re-assembly, then they may claim a defence under s72 of the Act, on the condition that the repair is for the purpose of restoring the complex products’ overall appearance. Further, the onus of proof is on the plaintiff to prove that the defendant knew, or ought reasonably to have known that the use of authorisation was not for the permitted purpose.
