= Daqiao, Ruyuan County =

Daqiao 大桥镇
- Town
- Location in Guangdong
- Coordinates: 24°58′58″N 113°09′12″E
- Country: People's Republic of China
- Province: Guangdong
- Prefecture-level city: Shaoguan
- County: Ruyuan Yao Autonomous County
- Village-level divisions: 1 residential community 21 villages
- Elevation: 396 m (1,299 ft)
- Time zone: UTC+8 (China Standard)
- Area code: 0751

Daqiao (simplified Chinese: 大桥; traditional Chinese: 大橋; pinyin: Dàqiáo; lit. 'great or large bridge') is a town of Ruyuan Yao Autonomous County in northern Guangdong province, China, located about 50 kilometres (31 mi) northwest of downtown Shaoguan and 27 km (17 mi) northwest of the county seat. G4 Beijing–Hong Kong and Macau Expressway runs along a ridge just to the west of the town. As of 2018, it has one residential community (居委会) and 21 villages under its administration.

== See also ==
- List of township-level divisions of Guangdong
