= Michael Blakeney =

Australian academic

Michael L. Blakeney is a Winthrop Professor of Law at the University of Western Australia. Blakeney is also visiting professor of Intellectual Property Law at Queen Mary University of London, and has worked in the World Intellectual Property Organization's Asia Pacific Bureau. His main areas of research are traditional knowledge, access to genetic resources and geographical indications. He is a Fellow of Australia's Academy of the Social Sciences.
