= Intellectual Property Office of New Zealand =

Coordinates: 41.293676°S 174.773549°E

Agency overview
- Formed: 1870 (New Zealand Patent Office)
- Jurisdiction: New Zealand
- Headquarters: 15 Stout Street, Wellington, New Zealand
- Minister responsible: Scott Simpson, Minister of Commerce and Consumer Affairs
- Agency executive: Ross van der Schyff, Commissioner of Patents, Trade Marks, Designs and Plant Variety Rights
- Parent agency: Ministry of Business, Innovation and Employment
- Website: http://www.iponz.govt.nz

The Intellectual Property Office of New Zealand (IPONZ) is a New Zealand government agency responsible for the granting and registration of intellectual property rights, specifically patent, trade mark, design and plant variety rights. It is a business unit of the New Zealand Ministry of Business, Innovation and Employment. According to its website, IPONZ "aims to ensure people realise the full economic potential of their intellectual property."

== Activities ==
IPONZ has a long history, beginning with the establishment of the New Zealand Patent Office in 1870. It now administers the:

- Patents Act 2013
- Trade Marks Act 2002
- Designs Act 1953
- Plant Variety Rights Act 1987
- Plant Variety Rights Act 2022, and
- Geographical Indications Registration Act 2006

Over the 2020/2021 financial year, IPONZ received 28,763 trade mark applications, 6,133 patent applications (including Patent Cooperation Treaty National Entry filings, but excluding divisionals), 1,418 design applications, and 116 plant variety right applications.

== Online services ==
IPONZ services are provided via its online case management facility. Its services include:

- IPONZ Database - search for patents, trade marks, designs, plant variety rights and Hearing decisions for free.
- IPONZ Renewals - applicant can renew their patent, trade mark or design online.
- Lodge Application - apply online for a search and preliminary advice for trade marks and apply to register a trade mark, patent or design online.
- Online Correspondence - submit and view your patent, trade mark and design correspondence online. Select from a range of document types including:
  - a response to your examination report or objections raised in your compliance report,
  - assignments, change of name or address requests,
  - requests for a certificate of Commissioner,
  - extension of time requests
- Online Journal - search the intellectual property journals.

== IPONZ email updates ==
IPONZ produces a short and concise eNewsletter containing important intellectual property information and updates. Subscribers can elect to receive eNewsletters containing specific information of interest to them including:

- Journal Publications (Patents, Trade Marks and Designs)
- Plant Variety Rights Journal Publication
- Decisions of the Commissioner
- Practice Notes and Legislation
- Online System Changes

== See also ==
- Copyright law of New Zealand
