= G0423 Lechang–Guangzhou Expressway =

Expressway in Guangdong, China

Lechang–Guangzhou Expressway
- 乐昌－广州高速公路
- Leguang Expressway 乐广高速公路

Route information
- Auxiliary route of G4

Major junctions
- North end: Lechang, Guangdong
- South end: Guangzhou, Guangdong

Location
- Country: China

Highway system
- National Trunk Highway System; Primary; Auxiliary; National Highways; Transport in China
| ← G0422 | → G0424 |

The Lechang–Guangzhou Expressway (simplified Chinese: 乐昌－广州高速公路; traditional Chinese: 樂昌－廣州高速公路), designated as G0423 and commonly abbreviated as Leguang Expressway (Chinese: 乐广高速), is an expressway in Guangdong province, China linking the cities of Lechang and Guangzhou. This expressway is a branch of G4 Jinggang'ao Expressway. It was formerly called S1 Guangle Expressway, then during the introduction of the 71118 extension of the NTHS, was numbered as G4W3 from 2013 to 2017.

== Route ==
North to South
| (1847) | G4 Jinggang'ao Expressway |
| 9 | G107 Road; Towards Pingshi |
| 20 | S249 Road; Towards Pingshi |
| 52 | S248 Road; Towards Lechang |
Service Area
| 64 | X325 Road; Bibei |
| 76 | S84 Shaoguan North Ring Expressway |
Service Area
Shaoguan Metropolitan Area
| 95 | G4 Jinggang'ao Expressway |
| 105 | S253 Road; Towards Longgui-Baitu |
| 111 | G6011 Nanshao Expressway (Formerly numbered as S10 Shaogan Expressway) |
Shaoguan Metropolitan Area
| 118 | S253 Road; Maba-Wushi |
| 124 | X317 Road; Zhangshi |
| 140 | X381 Road; Shakou |
Service Area
| 157 | X378 Road; Hengshitang-Yinghong |
| 175 | Yingbin Avenue; S347 Road; Yingde Yingde West Railway Station |
Service Area
| 189 | X407 Road; Lianjiangkou |
Service Area
| 206 | X367 Road; Lixi |
| 222 | S377 Road; Towards Qingyuan |
| | S14 Shanzhang Expressway |
| 235 | S253 Road; Jiangkou |
| 242 | S354 Road; Yuantan |
| 256 | G106 Road; Timian |
| 264 | S381 Road; Shiling |
| 267 | G45 Daguang Expressway; G94 Pearl River Delta Ring Expressway |
Continues as G45 Daguang Expressway
South to North
