= Ruyuan Yao Autonomous County =

Ruyuan 乳源瑶族自治县 Yuyuan
- County
- 乳源瑶族自治县; Ruyuan Yao Autonomous County
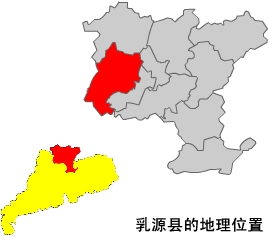
- Location of Ruyuan County (red) within Shaoguan City and Guangdong (yellow)
- Coordinates: 24°53′N 113°11′E
- Country: People's Republic of China
- Province: Guangdong
- Prefecture-level city: Shaoguan
- County seat: Rucheng

Area
  - Total: 2,227 km^{2} (860 sq mi)

Population (2020 census)
  - Total: 187,276
  - Density: 84.09/km^{2} (217.8/sq mi)
- Time zone: UTC+8 (China Standard)

Ruyuan (postal: Yuyuan; Chinese: 乳源; pinyin: Rǔyuán; Jyutping: jyu5 jyun4 jyun6), officially Ruyuan Yao Autonomous County, is a county of northern Guangdong province, China, with a small border with Hunan to the northwest. It is under the administration of Shaoguan City. It is one of Guangdong's three autonomous counties.

== Climate ==
Climate data for Ruyuan, elevation 131 m (430 ft), (1991–2020 normals, extremes 1981–present)
Month	Jan	Feb	Mar	Apr	May	Jun	Jul	Aug	Sep	Oct	Nov	Dec	Year
Record high °C (°F)	27.0 (80.6)	30.9 (87.6)	32.2 (90.0)	34.0 (93.2)	38.1 (100.6)	38.4 (101.1)	40.8 (105.4)	40.0 (104.0)	37.7 (99.9)	36.4 (97.5)	33.6 (92.5)	27.7 (81.9)	40.8 (105.4)
Mean daily maximum °C (°F)	14.5 (58.1)	16.8 (62.2)	19.1 (66.4)	24.7 (76.5)	28.9 (84.0)	31.6 (88.9)	33.9 (93.0)	33.7 (92.7)	31.3 (88.3)	27.7 (81.9)	22.6 (72.7)	17.1 (62.8)	25.2 (77.3)
Daily mean °C (°F)	10.0 (50.0)	12.3 (54.1)	15.1 (59.2)	20.4 (68.7)	24.4 (75.9)	27.0 (80.6)	28.6 (83.5)	28.3 (82.9)	26.1 (79.0)	22.1 (71.8)	16.9 (62.4)	11.6 (52.9)	20.2 (68.4)
Mean daily minimum °C (°F)	7.1 (44.8)	9.3 (48.7)	12.5 (54.5)	17.4 (63.3)	21.3 (70.3)	24.0 (75.2)	25.1 (77.2)	24.8 (76.6)	22.6 (72.7)	18.2 (64.8)	13.1 (55.6)	8.1 (46.6)	17.0 (62.5)
Record low °C (°F)	−1.7 (28.9)	−1.0 (30.2)	0.1 (32.2)	5.6 (42.1)	12.7 (54.9)	15.3 (59.5)	20.6 (69.1)	21.2 (70.2)	14.9 (58.8)	6.0 (42.8)	1.6 (34.9)	−3.1 (26.4)	−3.1 (26.4)
Average precipitation mm (inches)	86.0 (3.39)	100.6 (3.96)	193.9 (7.63)	213.2 (8.39)	291.5 (11.48)	313.0 (12.32)	202.1 (7.96)	195.0 (7.68)	114.8 (4.52)	59.6 (2.35)	65.5 (2.58)	56.7 (2.23)	1,891.9 (74.49)
Average precipitation days (≥ 0.1 mm)	12.7	14.0	20.1	17.9	19.2	20.3	16.2	16.0	11.6	6.4	7.9	8.4	170.7
Average snowy days	0.2	0	0	0	0	0	0	0	0	0	0	0.2	0.4
Average relative humidity (%)	77	78	82	81	81	82	77	77	77	72	74	74	78
Mean monthly sunshine hours	78.4	66.2	55.8	69.8	98.5	111.1	178.2	178.8	159.6	160.3	134.5	120.7	1,411.9
Percentage possible sunshine	23	21	15	18	24	27	43	45	44	45	41	37	32
Source: China Meteorological Administration All-time May high
