= George Milpurrurru =

Australian Aboriginal artist

- Born: 1934
- Died: 1998 (aged 63–64)
- Parent: Ngulmarrmar
- Relatives: Charlie Djurritjni (brother), Robyn Djunginy (sister), Dorothy Djukulul (sister), Gladys Getjpulu (daughter)

George Milpurrurru (1934–1998) was an Australian Aboriginal artist known for his bark paintings.

== Biography ==
Milpurrurru was born in 1934 and raised in central Arnhem Land, specifically Ganalbingu land, where he learned his artistry. He came from a family of artists; he was the son of Dick Ngulmarrmar, who taught him the art of bark painting, and the sister of Dorothy Djukulul, also a highly respected bark painter. Milpurrurru is a part of the Gurrumba Gurrumba clan, which translates to a flock of Geese. The traditions, styles, and surroundings of his clan provided much inspiration when it came to his bark paintings, which is shown through his usage of the Magpie Geese. The Magpie Goose is a totemic animal of the Gurrumba Gurrumba clan, and is often depicted surrounding water holes—birth and death portals to both creation and the afterlife. Milpurrurru's daughter, Gladys Getjpulu, is also an artist.

He died in 1998.

== Style ==
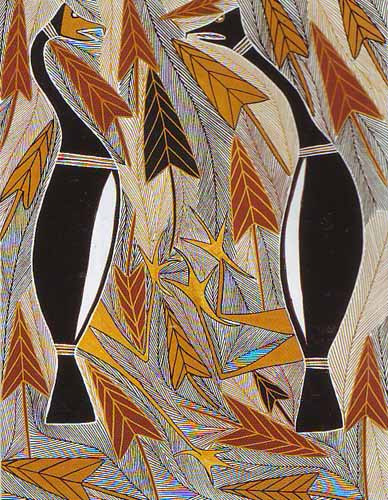
Gumang (Magpie Geese) 1990

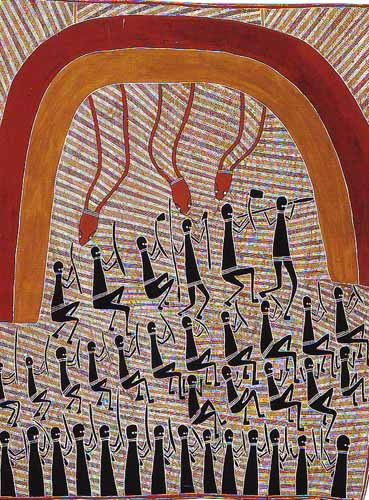
Gumang - The Goose Dancing Ceremony 1983

As one of the Ramingining artists, Milpurrurru was inspired by the narratives of his home, branching out from the style taught by his father. For him the space used is juxtaposed between stark forefront and background solid spaces, creating dimension with bare bark.

He individualised his work by adding innovative styles to the traditional styles and techniques of his clan such as combining the cross-hatching technique of Arnhem Land with the Eastern technique of depicting plain figures against black backgrounds. His most common theme amongst his paintings is the magpie geese.

== Career ==
He started his career as an artist by selling his work in the 1970s to art dealer Dorothy Bennett.

He was one of the first Indigenous artists to exhibit at the Biennale of Sydney in 1979.

Along with Johnny Bonguwuy and David Malangi, Milpurrurru took part in the 1979 Sydney event, A European Dialogue, in which their art was first broadcast to a wider audience, the larger part of metropolitan Australia.

In 1985, he showed his first solo exhibition at the Aboriginal Arts Australia Gallery in Sydney. Following his solo exhibition, he showed for a second time at the Biennale of Sydney. His work gained global recognition when he participated in several major international exhibitions, like Aratjara, touring Europe from 1993 to 1994. Milpurrurru was also a senior contributing artist to the Aboriginal Memorial, and the first Aboriginal artist with a solo retrospective exhibition at the National Gallery of Australia in Canberra.

== The Goose Egg Hunt ==
His work The Goose Egg Hunt (1983) is held by the National Gallery. In 1993 it was used by Australia Post on the 85c postage stamp, celebrate the International Year for the World's Indigenous People.

Milpurrurru also played an integral role in the "carpets case" or t-shirts case, a 1994 successful lawsuit dealing with the application of copyright in Australia and Indigenous intellectual property to Indigenous Australian arts, along with Banduk Marika, Tim Payungka Tjapangarti, John Bulun Bulun and four others. John Bulun Bulun filed alongside Milpurrurru in the case John Bulun Bulun & Anor v R & T Textiles Pty Ltd. Goose Egg Hunt had been used by a Perth company to be reproduced on textiles in Vietnam. The conclusion of these cases resulted in the acceptance of traditional knowledge to be copyrighted.

== Aboriginal Memorial ==
The Aboriginal Memorial is a memorial constructed by forty three men and women of Ramingining and is meant to serve as a reminder of the Aboriginal peoples' place within Australia in response to European colonisation. It is made up of 200 decorated hollow log coffins which are situated to act as a map to showcase the artists Country and was conceived by Djon (John) Mundine in 1987–88 and realised by 43 artists, one of whom was Milpurruruu. Milpurrurru's work, representing the Ganalbingu people in the upper right bank of the memorial, is intended to demonstrate distinction of place through the depiction of water lilies and cormorants.

== Public collections ==
Milpurruruu's work is held in the permanent collections of the following:

- National Museum of Australia
- National Gallery of Victoria
- Art Gallery of New South Wales
