= Arafura =

Arafura refers to the name of the Arafura Sea, and by extension to adjoining areas or associated events:

Animals

- Arafura catfish, Pararius proximus
- Arafura fantail, Rhipidura dryas
- Arafura file snake, Acrochordus arafurae
- Arafura large-footed bat, Myotis moluccarum
- Arafura shrikethrush, Colluricincla megarhyncha

Places

- Arafura Jungles, north-east Arnhem Land, Northern Territory, Australia
- Arafura Sea, located between northern Australia and New Guinea
- Arafura Swamp, north-east Arnhem Land, Northern Territory, Australia
- Electoral division of Arafura, in Australia's Northern Territory

Other

- Arafura-class offshore patrol vessel
- Arafura Games, international multi-sport event drawing competitors from Australasia and Asia
- Arafura Resources, Australian mineral exploration company
