= Jimmy Wululu =

Indigenous Australian artist

- Born: 1936
- Died: 5 October 2005
- Known for: Bark painting, memorial poles
- Awards: Rothman's Foundation Award, National Aboriginal and Torres Strait Islander Art Awards, 1989

Jimmy Wululu (c. 1936–2005) was an Aboriginal Australian artist of the Gupapuyngu language group. He was a major contributor to the Aboriginal Memorial and he was one of the major painters of the 1980s from his language group. He is known for his bark paintings and his memorial poles. His works have been featured in numerous significant exhibits all over the world.

== Life ==
Wululu was born in 1936 and he died on 5 October 2005. He is an artist of the Gupapuyngu language group and part of the Yirritja moiety and he is from Arnhem Land in Australia. He grew up at the Milingimbi Methodist Mission and he first worked as a laborer and a builder. He started painting professionally in the late 1970s and his works are said to be in the traditional Arnhem Land tradition.

== Career ==
Wululu started professionally painting in the late 1970s. He is best known for his bark art and his art on hollow poles. His bark art is of the traditional Aboriginal style, which means that these bark arts are made of ochre and sheets of bark. He worked with David Malangi. Wululu has rights in Balmbi country to paint via his mother's mother. This means that he is entitled to paint the Yathalamarra stories. He is best known for his catfish bone designs on his bark and poles.

== Exhibitions ==
Wululu's work has been included in major exhibitions such as the Dreaming Exhibition in the United States in 1988. His works have been a part of many other exhibitions. Fifteen of his poles were featured in the Magiciens de la Terre show in Paris in 1989. Some of the other exhibitions that his other works have been a part of are The Continuing Traditions (1989), I Shall Never Become a White Man at the MCA, Sydney (1994), Aratjara (1993-1994), and Paintings and Sculptures from Ramingining: Jimmy Wululu and Philip Gudthaykudthay (Note: Philip Gudthaykudthay is an artist of Bula'Bula Arts in Ramingining.) at the Drill Hall Gallery (1992).

== Collections ==
- Art Gallery of New South Wales
- Kluge-Ruhe Aboriginal Art Collection of the University of Virginia
- National Gallery of Australia
- National Gallery of Victoria
- National Museum of Australia

== Works ==
- Djaranbu ceremony (1962)
- Catfish and herringbone (1987-1988)
- Catfish and eel design (1987)
- Niwuda - Yirritja Honey
- Hollow Log Coffin with Honey and Catfish Designs (1987)
- Hollow Log Coffin with Catfish and Eel Designs (1987)
- Clan Well (1975-1976)

== Significant exhibitions ==
- Dreaming Exhibition (1988)
- Magiciens de le Terre Show (1989)
- The Continuing Traditions (1989)
- I Shall Never Become a White Man (1994)
- Aratjara (1993-1994)
- Paintings and Sculptures from Ramingining: Jimmy Wululu and Philip Gudthaykudthay (1992)
