= Dorothy Djukulul =

Australian artist (born 1942)

- Born: 10 June 1942 (age 83); Arnhem Land

Dorothy Djukulul (born 1942) is a traditional Australian Aboriginal artist who lives in Ramingining in Central Arnhem Land. She speaks Ganalbingu and is a part of the Gurrumba Gurrumba clan, who identify as being a part of the Yirrija moiety.

== Biography ==
Dorothy Djukulul was born on 10 June 1942 at Murrwangi, near the Arafura Swamp in Arnhem Land. During her childhood, Djukulul and her family lived on Milingimbi Island, where she attended a Methodist school. Early in her career, Djukulul worked in a bakery in the newly established trading post in Maningrida, an Aboriginal community. After finishing school Djukulul and her family moved back to Ramingining. After marrying her first husband, she moved to Maningrida, but after his death she moved back to Ramingining. Djukulul married her second husband, Djardie Ashley, in 1978.

Djukulul learned to paint from her father, Ngulmarmar. Ngulmarmar was a distinguished bark painter whose works have hung in numerous major art galleries and have been featured in books of art. Djukulul is one of the first women painters in central Arnhem Land and is also permitted to paint images normally restricted to male artists. This is because Ngulmarmar was afraid that some of the art and sacred stories would die out if his son were unable to pass them on. He asked the tribal elders to allow Djukulul to paint these designs, thus preserving the sacred art of the Ganalbingu tribe.

== Career ==
Djukulul practices her art in Ramingining, Central Arnhem Land, Northern Territory. She has made several pieces with her second husband, bark painter Djardie Ashley (born 1950), including at the Aboriginal Artist Gallery in Melbourne in 1984 and 1986.

Djukulul was one of several artists who created "The Aboriginal Memorial", an installation of 200 carved and painted log coffins intended to commemorate the deaths of Aboriginal people from European settlement. The installation, built in the late 1980s, was first put on display in Sydney in 1988, and currently on display at the National Gallery of Australia.

Djukulul and her second husband, Djardie Ashley, have exhibited their work together, including two shows at the Aboriginal Artist Gallery in Melbourne (1984 & 1986). Ten of their paintings in the Artist Gallery in Melbourne were acquired for the Robert Holmes à Court Collection at the later show. Djukulul has also participated in many group exhibitions.

In 1991, Djukulul was the recipient of a commission for John Kluge title "Painting the Land Collection" in Virginia, USA.

Djukulul was including in the project called Twelve Canoes which was based on the film Ten Canoes (2003). This project strives to highlight key aspects of Yolngu culture in Ramingining. Several works by Djukulul were included in this project.

Djukulul paints many designs that are deemed taboo for women to work with in her culture. Within her caveat on the use of these designs and spiritual stories, Djukulul has developed her own unique style that distinguishes her among men and women painters alike, admired by both Balanda and Yolngu.

== Collections ==
Djukulul has works in the collections of the National Gallery of Australia, the Art Gallery of New South Wales, the National Gallery of Victoria and the National Museum of Australia, and the Museum of Cultural History, the Hood Museum of Art at Dartmouth College and the Kluge-Ruhe Aboriginal Art Collection of the University of Virginia.

Among the several artists who created "The Aboriginal Memorial" installation (late 1980s), Djukulul and Ashley had two shows at the Aboriginal Artist Gallery in Melbourne (1984 & 1986). Ten of their works were added to the Robert Holmes à Court Collection. In the years following the Melbourne shows, Djukulul and Ashley exhibited together again in 1988 at Esplanade Gallery in Darwin, Australia, and again, in 1990 at Cooee Gallery in Paddington, Australia.

In 2018, Djukulul was included in the Nancy Sever Gallery exhibition titled "Tim, Tom E., Harry, Rusty, Tiger & Pussycat: Recent Works on Paper with Basil Hall". In this exhibition, recent works by indigenous artists from six remote communities were hand-printed by a master printmaker.

== Significant exhibitions ==
- 1984: Dorothy Djukulul and Djardie Ashley. Aboriginal Artist Gallery in Melbourne.
- 1986: Dorothy Djukulul and Djardie Ashley. Aboriginal Artist Gallery in Melbourne.
- 1988: Five Dupan (Hollow Logs). The Aboriginal Memorial.
- 1988: Dorothy Djukulul and Djardie Ashley. Esplanade Gallery in Darwin
- 1990: Dorothy Djukulul and Djardie Ashley. Cooee Gallery in Paddington.
- 2018: Tim, Tom E., Harry, Rusty, Tiger & Pussycat: Recent Works on Paper with Basil Hall. Nancy Sever Gallery.
