= Djon Mundine =

Australian curator, writer, artist and activist

Djon Mundine OAM
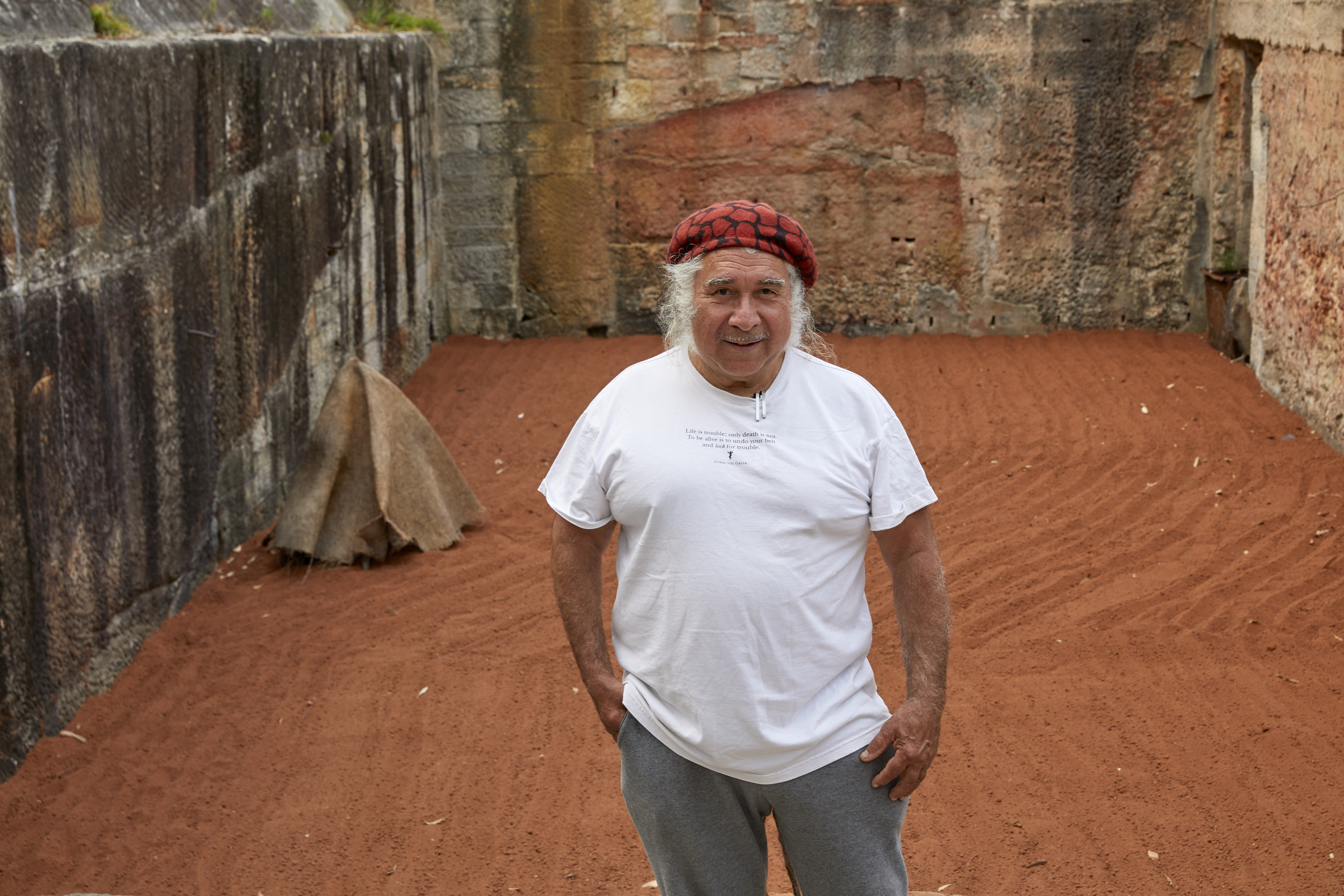
- Born: John Mundine; 1951 (age 74–75); Grafton, New South Wales, Australia
- Awards: Red Ochre Award
- Website: www.djonmundine.com

Djon Mundine OAM (born 1951) is an Aboriginal Australian artist, curator, activist and writer. He is a member of the Bundjalung people of northern New South Wales. He is known for having conceived the 1988 work Aboriginal Memorial, on display at the National Gallery of Art in Canberra.

== Early life ==
Djon was born in Grafton, New South Wales in 1951. He was born 6th of 11 children to Roy Mundine and Olive Bridgette Mundine (nee Donovan). John's father Roy was a union stockman, and Olive's father had joined the first Indigenous Australian political party, the Australian Aboriginal Progressive Association, in the 1920s. His family was very poor growing up, but he credits his father with encouraging the children to think: "I suppose you're not supposed to talk about sex and politics and religion at the table, but he'd get us to talk about whatever was in the papers." He is the elder brother of former politician Nyunggai Warren Mundine. His family later moved to Sydney in 1963, where he attended Marist Brothers schools in Auburn and Parramatta.

He is a Wehbal man from the West Bundjalung nation, from the Northern Rivers of New South Wales. He is also a descendant of the Yuin people.

Mundine spent his early life in South Grafton. He was exposed to the traditions of Aboriginal art and technique from a young age.

In 1963, his family settled in the western Sydney suburb of Auburn. Mundine went to the Marist Brothers College then called Benedict College, and went on to commence study at Macquarie University.

== Art career ==
After deciding that college was not the right path for him, he became an art adviser at Milingimbi Art Centre as art and craft advisor at Milingimbi in the Crocodile Islands in 1979, and afterwards as curator and adviser at Bula'Bula Arts in Ramingining, in Arnhem Land, for 16 years. There he conceived of the concept for the famous Aboriginal Memorial, which is on permanent display at the National Gallery of Australia in Canberra.

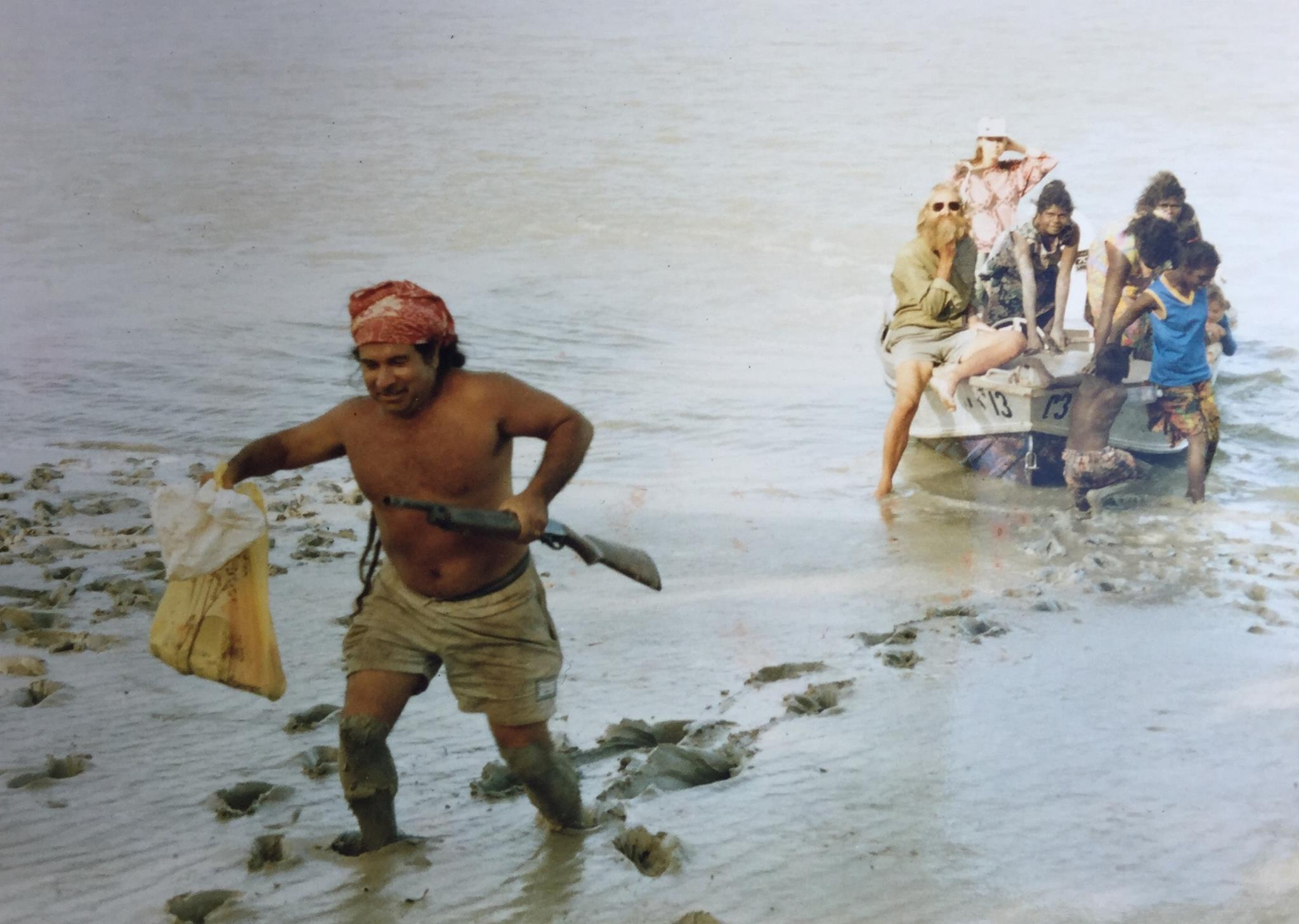
Arafura Swamp Ramingining

From 1979 to 1995, Mundine lived and worked in remote Aboriginal communities including Ramingining, Milingimbi, and Maningrida, where he served as an art adviser. He has described this period as formative, likening it to a spiritual pilgrimage that shaped his curatorial vision.

Mundine is particularly well-known for his work as the concept artist and producer of the Aboriginal Memorial. This is a work of contemporary Indigenous Australian art comprising 200 decorated hollow log coffins, offered as a commemoration of the Australian Bicentenary celebrations in 1988; the log coffins represent 200 years of European occupation of Australia. Their design directly references the traditional hollow log mortuary ceremony of Central Arnhem Land, commemorates those Indigenous Australians who died as a result of European settlement. The work was realised by 43 artists from Ramingining and neighbouring communities of Central Arnhem Land, in the Northern Territory, including David Malangi, George Milpurrurru, and Philip Gudthaykudthay. It was acquired by the National Gallery of Australia, where it is on permanent display. Its first exhibition was at the Sydney Biennale in 1988, and it has travelled to various galleries around the world over the years.

The Native Born (1996, MCA), was an exhibition and publication showing ceremonial and utilitarian weaving and artistic work from Ramingining community. This led to the inclusion of artists such as Robyn Djunginy in the 1998 Sydney Biennale. They are Meditating: Bark Paintings from the Museum of Contemporary Art's Arnott Collection (2008) was another major exhibition, which consisted of over 200 objects from the Ramingining Collection. He divided the collection between six different environments in the Ramingining area : Larrtha'puy (mangroves), Diltjipuy (forests); Gulunbuy (waterholes); Retjapuy (jungles); Rangipuy(beaches); and Ninydjiyapuy (plains). Mundine honoured the intricate kinship system of Aboriginal culture by using pieces that not only depicted objects in nature, but also represented the histories and social structures of Aboriginal Australia.

In 2008, Mundine created an exhibition called Etched in the Sun. The exhibition was organised held at Drill Hall Gallery in Canberra. It consisted of several fine art prints representing years of collaboration between Aboriginal artists and fine art printers. Artwork made between 1997 and 2007 by Indigenous artists such as Judy Watson, Banduk Marika, and Jean Baptiste Apuatimi were included.

Another exhibition that he curated in 2008 was the Ngadhu, ngulili, ngeaninyagu: a personal history of Aboriginal art in the Premier State. It was held at the Campbelltown Arts Centre, and included work from artists like Brooke Andrew, Bronwyn Bancroft, and Badger Bates.

In 2017, Djon Mundine curated Four Women: (I Do Belong) Double at the Lismore Regional Gallery. Inspired by Nina Simone’s song “Four Women,” the exhibition examined the complex identities, histories, and strength of Aboriginal and Torres Strait Islander women. Mundine brought together a range of contemporary artists including Karla Dickens, Fiona Foley, Romaine Moreton, and Wart to explore themes of resilience, cultural belonging, and political resistance. The exhibition emphasized the diversity of Blak womanhood through visual art, performance, and multimedia. It challenged stereotypes and celebrated lived experience. In 2020 Mundine won the Australia Council's Red Ochre Award for Lifetime Achievement.

In 2022, Mundine led "The Dabee Family Choir Mural Project." The project originated from the Jimmy and Peggy Lambert Memorial Mural in Kandos Museum. It was created to honour the lives of Jimmy and Peggy, who were survivors of the Dabee Massacre in 1823. For the exhibition, Mundine had over 60 descendants finger-paint Peggy and Jimmy's images.

Mundine has been working on the Dingo Project, an exhibition he curated for Ngununggula, which looks into the spiritual mythology and the history of the ancestral dingoes. The project also features works from artists such as Karla Dickens, Fiona Foley, and Daniel Boyd.

As of 2023 Mundine continues to work as an independent curator of contemporary First Nations art, and as cultural mentor for fellow First Nations artists. He has been working on Ngununggula's second Entry Pavilion Commission. The Entry Pavilion Commission is an annual initiative in celebrating Gundungurra language, culture, and history. The exhibition is set to launch on 22 October 2023 and will be open for the public until 26 November.

== Other activities ==
Along with working at the arts centres, Mundine played a significant role in the community and worked with many regional and community-based organisations across Australia. Mundine has always been dedicated to his culture and community, and joined the Association of Northern, Kimberley and Arnhem Aboriginal Artists (ANKAAA) as one of its founding members in 1987. He has also held curatorial posts at several institutions, including the Art Gallery of NSW, and the Museum of Contemporary Art Australia.

Mundine is known in the Aboriginal community for his work and beliefs. As an author, Mundine is able to express his beliefs about art and stay relevant. Mundine often uses his pieces of writing as a means to look deeper into art, past its mediums and origins.

In 2001, Djon Mundine co-authored "Passion, Rich Collectors and the Export Dollar: The Selling of Aboriginal Art Overseas" with Felicity Wright. The essay critically examines the global commercialization of Aboriginal art, highlighting the tension between gaining international exposure and preserving the cultural integrity of Indigenous Australian works. Mundine critiques how Aboriginal art is often shaped to meet Western expectations, which can lead to misrepresentation and cultural distortion. The piece advocates for more ethical, informed approaches to selling and promoting Aboriginal art on the global stage.

Between 2005 and 2006 Mundine was a research professor at the National Museum of Ethnology (Minpaku) in Osaka, Japan.

In 2012, Mundine curated Bungaree: The First Australian at Mosman Art Gallery, featuring 15 Indigenous artists exploring the legacy and myth of Bungaree, an Aboriginal man who circumnavigated Australia with Matthew Flinders. The exhibition examined themes of representation, identity, and historical memory, highlighting Bungaree's role as a cultural intermediary and public figure. Known as the "King of Broken Bay," Bungaree was a celebrity in colonial Sydney, often depicted wearing a red military coat, sometimes without clothing underneath. He was the subject of 18 known portraits, compared to only a few of Governor Macquarie, and may have been the first person referred to in print as "an Australian."

In October 2023, ahead of the 2023 Australian referendum on the Indigenous Voice to Parliament, Mundine spoke in support of the Yes vote on SBS Television discussion programme Insight. He had not discussed this opinion with his brother Nyunggai Warren Mundine, who is one of the leaders of the No campaign.

In a 2024 article in the Journal of Australian Studies, Djon Mundine described how, in Aboriginal cosmology, flashes of white light or rainbow refractions in nature, such as in reptiles, insects, or fish, are signs of divine presence. He connected this imagery to the ongoing cycle of life and death and the spiritual continuity between the living and the ancestors. His perspective reinforces the idea that Aboriginal art is not only a form of visual expression but also a cosmological and cultural practice grounded in memory, nature, and belief.

Djon Mundine, as Senior Indigenous Consultant Curator at the Queensland Art Gallery, played a key role in curating and reflecting on the work of Michael Riley, a pioneering Aboriginal photographer and filmmaker. Mundine has written about Riley’s ability to blend personal history, spirituality, and political insight through both photography and film. He highlighted works like Sacrifice and Cloud, noting their significance in expressing internal spiritual struggle and broader Indigenous experience. Mundine’s engagement with Riley’s art contributes to ongoing recognition of Aboriginal artists whose work bridges tradition, identity, and contemporary visual culture.

Known for his sharp and provocative essays, Mundine often blends pop culture with critical commentary, referencing works like Zoolander and Moby-Dick to critique representations of Aboriginal identity and vanity in contemporary art.

== Honours and awards ==
- 1993: Medal of the Order of Australia, "for service to the promotion and development of Aboriginal arts, crafts and culture"
- 2005-2006: PhD candidate at National College of Art and Design
- 2015: Level 2 winner, Indigenous Project or Keeping Place, for Bungaree’s Farm at Mosman Art Gallery, at the Australian Museums and Galleries Association MAGNA Awards
- 2016: Best in Heritage Conference, Dubrovnik, showcased entry and finalist, Bungaree’s Farm
- 2017: Inaugural Power Publications Award for Indigenous Art Writing, for his essay "The Aboriginal Memorial: Australia's Forgotten War".
- 2020: Red Ochre Award - Australia Council for the Arts
- 2026: Shortlisted for the Victorian Premier's Literary Award for Indigenous Writing for Windows and Mirrors

== Other roles ==
- 2020 Patron, King & Wood Mallesons Contemporary First Nation Art Award
- 2018 Patron: King & Wood Mallesons Contemporary First Nation Art Prize
- 2018 Judge: Woollahra Small Sculpture Award
- 2007 Judge: Telstra National Aboriginal & Torres Strait Islander Art Award
- 2000 Judge: The Art of Place: The 5th National Indigenous Heritage Art Awards, Australian Heritage Commission
- 1993 Curator: Bayside Council First Nations Art Competition
- 1988 Judge: Telstra National Aboriginal & Torres Strait Islander Art Award
- 1985-87 Aboriginal Art Adviser, Artbank
- 1996 Judge: Telstra National Aboriginal & Torres Strait Islander Art Award

== Writings ==
- 1992-Tyerabarrbowaryaou : I shall never become a white man / [curators, Fiona Foley and Djon Mundine], published book, Museum of Contemporary Art
- 1996,2000-The Native Born: Objects and Representations From Ramingining, Arnhem Land - Mundine, Djon; Murphy, Bernice; Rudder, John, published book, Museum of Contemporary Art (Sydney, N.S.W.)
- 2005-Parliament of New South Wales Indigenous Art Prize - Perkins, Hetti; Mundine, Djon; Munro, Keith; Andrews, Yvette, book; government document, New South Wales
- 2008-Deacon-structing Destiny, Essay, for Clandestine [exhibition] - Destiny Deacon and Virginia Fraser, Tandanya, Adelaide Arts Festival
- Opening talk by Djon Mundine OAM: Twined, on Robyn Djunginy and Karen Mills
- 2012-Bungaree: the first Australian - Djon Mundine, published book, Mosman Art Gallery
- 2012- Shadowlife
- 2014-Whisper in My Mask, Book, Artlink
- 2014-Aboriginal performance art: How bizarre!, Essay, Artlink
- 2015-The Aboriginal Memorial to Australia's forgotten war, Essay, Artlink
- 2015- Bungaree-A Man in Space
- 2015-Woman on the Dunes, Fiona Foley, Interview, Artlink
- 2017-The Masque Ball of Tracey Moffatt, Australian Pavilion at the 57th Venice Biennale, Review, Artlink
- 2017-Lucky Country - Adam Hill aka Blak Douglas, catalogue essay, the 2017 Triennale, NGA
- 2017-Four Women (I do belong) Double, Catalogue essay, Lismore Art Gallery, pp.6-9
- 2018-The Road to Bentinck Island: Sally and Her Sisters – Sally and Her Daughters, The Indigenous Story Project
- 2018-Archie Moore 1970-2018, Review, Artlink
- 2019-Politico-Magic-Realism, Destiny Deacon, Short Essay
- 2019-Blak Lik Mi, Blak Queensland Portraits, Cairns Art Gallery
- 2019-Who Are These Strangers and Where Are They Going, catalogue Essay, Fiona Foley, Ballarat International Foto Bienal
- 2025: Windows and Mirrors, Art Ink ISBN 978-0-6450166-9-7

== Exhibitions ==
Year	Exhibition (as curator)	Co-Creators	Artists	Gallery	Festival	Location	Description
2022	The Dingo Project		Daniel Boyd, Michael Cook, Judith Crispin, Karla Dickens, Blak Douglas, Michael Eather, Fiona Foley, Maddison Gibbs, Julie Gough, Aroha Groves, Fiona Hall, Warwick Keen, Gartha Lena, Trish Levett, John William Lindt, Johnny Malibirr, Teena Mccarthy, Talullah Mccord, Danie Mellor, Djon Mundine OAM FAHA, James Neagle, Lin Onus, George Pascoe jnr, Jenny Sages, Peter Swan, Jason Wing	Ngununggula		Bowral, NSW	The Dingo Project will investigate the spiritual mythology and the historical narratives of ancestral dingoes. Furthermore, it addresses questions of familial and national forgiveness and Aboriginal connections to country and nature.
2020	Three Visions of the Garingal		Karla Dickens, Jason Wing, Blak Douglas	Mosman Art Gallery	Sydney Festival	Sydney, NSW	
2019	Who Are These Strangers and Where Are They Going		Fiona Foley		Ballarat International Foto Biennal	Ballarat, Victoria	A photographic series, large-scale installations, and the Sydney debut of a new musical soundscape based on the oldest known Aboriginal song, documenting the first exchange between Captain Cook in 1770 by the Batjala people of K'gari. Also presented by the National Art School in January 2020.
2017	Living in Their Times		Daniel Boyd, Jason Wing, Peter McKenzie, Leanne Tobin, Amala Groom, BLAK Douglas, Leah Flanagan, Sandy Woods, Chantelle Woods, Caroline Oakley, Bjorn Stewart, Karla Dickens, and Warwick Keen	Mosman Art Gallery		Sydney	An exhibition that reflected on the lineage of Aboriginal and Torres Strait Islander self-determination and activism before and after the 1967 referendum. Included a restaging of Bungaree's Farm, an immersive three-channel video installation reflecting on the life of Bungaree; first staged at Mosman Art Gallery in 2015.
2015	Bungaree's Farm		Daniel Boyd, Blak Douglas, Karla Dickens, Leah Flanagan, Amala Groom, Warwick Keen, Peter McKenzie, Djon Mundine OAM, Caroline Oakley, Bjorn Stewart, Leanne Tobin, Jason Wing, Chantal Woods and Sandy Woods.	Mosman Art Gallery		Sydney, NSW	Contemporary Aboriginal audio, video, performance, and installation art surrounding the legacy of Bungaree; commissioned in 2015 to mark the 200th anniversary of the establishment of Bungaree's Farm by Governor Macquarie on 31 January 1815
2012	Shadowlife	Natalie King	Vernon Ah Kee, Bindi Cole, Brenda L. Croft, Destiny Deacon/Virginia Fraser, Fiona Foley, Gary Lee, Michael Riley, Ivan Sen, Christian Thompson	Bangkok Arts and Cultural Center		Bangkok, Thailand	Toured around Asia, starting in Bangkok; curated by Mundine and Natalie King, with works from nine Indigenous and one non-Indigenous Australian artists.
2012	Ghost Citizens: witnessing the intervention		Alison Alder, Bindi Cole, Fiona Foley, Dan Jones, Fiona MacDonald, Chips Mackinolty, Sally M. Mulda	The Cross Art Projects		Wollongong, NSW	"In a continent full of the ghosts and shadows of colonialism, the historical, social, and physical landscape is pitted. Each story is a ghost story loaded with shadows – a kind of 'scar' story." (Djon Mundine)

== Boards, committees and associations ==
Year	Role	Board, Committee or Association	Location	Description
2020	Member	Biennale of Contemporary Art, Festival of Pacific Arts	Noumea, New Caledonia	
1985-2000	Member - Visual Arts	AIATSIS Research Ethics Committee	Canberra	
1998	Executive Member	Australian Indigenous Cultural Network	Canberra	The Australian Indigenous Cultural Network (AICN) was an initiative initially funded independently in 1998 by Richard Pratt, through the Australian Foundation for Culture and the Humanities. It became an incorporated association in 2001, and was jointly supported by the Australia Business Arts Foundation and AIATSIS. Patrick Dodson was chair at that point. It was wound up in 2003.
1991-98	Executive Member	National Indigenous Arts Association (NIAAA)	East Sydney NSW	NIAAA, previously Aboriginal Arts Management Agency (A.A.M.A) was a national Indigenous arts and cultural service and advocacy association which advocated for the continued and increased recognition and protection of the rights of Indigenous artists. It was "virtually defunct" by December 2002, and lost its funding.
1996	Member of the Indigenous Reference Group	Intellectual Property Protection for Aboriginal and Torres Strait Islander Peoples	Canberra	A Commonwealth inter-departmental committee
1996	Expert Examiner	National Cultural Heritage Committee	Canberra	A committee established by the Department of Communication and the Arts under the Protection of Movable Cultural Heritage Act 1986
1992, 95-96	Committee Member	ATSIC Cultural Industry Advisory Committee (CIAC)	Canberra	A committee established by the Aboriginal and Torres Strait Islander Committee (ASIC) to develop and manage the Aboriginal and Torres Strait Islander Cultural Industry Strategy
1987	Founding and Executive Member	Association of Northern, Kimberley and Arnhem Land Australian Aboriginal Artists (ANKA)	Darwin, NT	Arnhem, Northern and Kimberley Artists (ANKA), the peak support and advocacy body for Aboriginal artists and Aboriginal-owned community art centres spread across over one million square kilometres of country in the Top End of the Northern Territory and Western Australia
1989	Member	Australia Council - Aboriginal & Torres Strait Islander Arts Committee	Canberra	
1985-87	Director	Aboriginal Arts Australia		
