= Mathaman Marika =

Australian Aboriginal artist

- Born: c.1920
- Died: 1970
- Relatives: Mawalan 1 Marika, Milirrpum Marika, Roy Dadaynga Marika, Dhunggala Marika (brothers)

Mathaman Marika (c.1920–1970) was an Aboriginal Australian artist and Indigenous rights activist. He was a member of the Rirratjingu clan of the Yolngu people of north-east Arnhem Land in the Northern Territory, and one of the well-known Marika family, brother of Mawalan 1 Marika, Milirrpum Marika, Roy Dadaynga Marika, and Dhunggala Marika. Mathaman was second oldest after Mawalan.

Mathaman and his four brothers led the other clans in presenting the Yirrkala bark petitions to the Australian Government in 1963, in the lead-up to the Gove land rights case, and Mathaman continued the struggle for land rights after the death of his elder brother Mawalan 1 in 1967.

Mathaman painted the third portion of the Dhuwa side of the Yirrkala Church Panels in 1963. His painting depicts the Djang'kawu Sisters arriving at their first camp, singing their journey across a newly-created watering hole.

The remaining Marika brothers were involved in the 1971 Milirrpum v Nabalco Pty Ltd (named after Mathaman's brother Milirrpum, also known as the Gove land rights case). All five were politically active for the rights of the Indigenous Australians, and four were also well-known Aboriginal artists.

Mathaman Marika held an important place in ceremonial life and produced most of his artwork from the late 1950s until his death. An art dealer in Melbourne, Jim Davidson, was a friend and became his agent in the 1960s.

His painting themes included the creator beings Djang'kawu's journey to Yalangbara, the Morning Star ceremony, various Nhulunbuy stories, and also the stories of a different (Manhdalpuy) clan, the Wagilag sisters. (Special rights were obtained for the latter by his grandfather in the 20th century, and have been passed down since.)
