= Evonne Munuyngu =

Indigenous Australian artist

Evonne Munuyngu (born 1960), of the skin name Bilinydjanm, is an Indigenous Australian contemporary artist, weaver, and sculptor. She works at the Bula'Bula Arts Center in Ramingining, Eastern Arnhem Land. She works alongside her sister, Mary Dhalapany in their weaving and artistic practices.

== Bibliography ==
Munuyngu was born in 1960 in Mirrngatja, an outstation on the eastern edge of the Arafura Swamp. She is a triplet, with her siblings being artist Mary Dhalapany and actor David Gulpilil. She also has another brother, Peter Minygululu, who is a wood carver and a bark painter. Munuyngu's mother taught her and her sister the mastery of weaving before her death. She speaks the language of and is in the Mandhalpuy clan.

== Art career ==
Munuyngu works in the Bula'Bula Arts Center in her community. She is known as a "stalwart" and is said to be the "first person to arrive each day". She is best known for her intricate process of weaving pandanus leaves into bags, baskets and other useful tools.

Julie Shaw commission a top to a gown from the Bula'Bula arts community, which was featured in Australian Vogue in 2022. Munuyngu contributed to the weaving process for the top portion of the dress.

She was featured in the PET Lamp Project, started by Spanish designer Alvaro Catalan de Ocon, in which she made a woven mat from plastic and pandanus leaves. The collection was prompted by the National Gallery of Victoria Triennial in 2011. The work's objective is to turn waste into something functional.

== Collections ==
Evonne Munuyngu's work is held in the permanent collection of the National Gallery of Victoria.
