= Philip Gudthaykudthay =

Aboriginal Australian artist (died 2022)

Philip Gudthaykudthay (pronounced "g'day, g'day"; 1935 or earlier – October 2022), also known as Pussycat, was an Aboriginal Australian artist. His work is held in many public galleries in Australia and internationally, including the British Museum.

== Early life ==
Philip Gudthaykudthay was born south of Ramingining, near Mulgurrum in central Arnhem Land, in the Northern Territory of Australia around 1935 or possibly earlier; some sources suggest the 1920s). His father was Lika, brother of Miyalan, and his mother Ganinydja 1, of the Djardewitjibi group. After both parents died, he was adopted by a Murrungun clan family. He was initiated at Gatji lagoon in around 1949, which included septum piercing, a very old cultural practice that has mostly died out.

His name is pronounced something like "g'day, g'day". He is a Yolngu man of the Liyagalawumirr language group, and his mother's country was Ramingining. He was assigned the nickname "Pussycat" because the quoll, or native cat, which is part of the Milky Way Dreaming, is his totem, and his physical features resemble a cat.

As a young man Gudthaykudthay worked on making fences, hunting crocodiles, and as a stockman as a young man, on Milingimbi and around Ramingining.

== Art career ==
Gudthaykudthay started painting at Nangalala Mission on the Glyde River in the 1960s, getting instruction from his half-brother Mirritja, with Milingimbi Mission selling his early work. He developed a close relationship with artist Djon Mundine in the 1980s, travelling all over Arnhem Land with him and participating in all of his projects.

He participated in printmaking workshops at Bula'Bula Arts in Ramingining, and continued to paint at the art centre throughout his life.

He often used the kangaroo motif in his work. He also painted the Wagilag sisters, goannas, echidnas, frogs, and other subjects.

When Gudthaykudthay had his first solo exhibition at the Garry Anderson Gallery in Sydney in 1983, which consisted of bark paintings, he was the first artist from Ramingining to have one. The exhibition sold out and the National Gallery of Australia acquired two of the paintings.

In 2010, he was commissioned to create murals for the Ramingining Men's Safe House.

He has had his work sold by commercial galleries and it is represented in many galleries in Australia, including university and state collections.

== Other activities ==
In 2006, he played a significant role in Rolf de Heer's film Ten Canoes, as The Sorcerer. He contributed to the film through his understanding of traditional life portrayed in the film, including his knowledge of making bark canoes.

== Death ==
He died in October 2022.

== Exhibitions ==
Gudthaykudthay held two exhibitions with Jimmy Wululu. His work has also been represented in a number of group and solo exhibitions, some of which are listed below.

=== Group ===
- 1988: Contribution of five burial poles of the 200 created by Ramingining artists for the Aboriginal Memorial, now located at the National Gallery of Australia
- 1993–4: Aratjara, an international exhibition
- 1994: The Power of the Land, National Gallery of Victoria
- 1997: The Painters of the Wagilag Sisters Story 1937–1997, at the National Gallery of Australia in Canberra
- 2007: Culture Warriors, the inaugural National Indigenous Art Triennial, curated by Brenda L. Croft, at the National Gallery of Australia

=== Solo ===
- 1983: Garry Anderson Gallery, Sydney
- 1991: Roslyn Oxley9 Gallery
- 1995: Aboriginal & South Pacific Gallery, Surry Hills, Sydney
- 2003: My Art, My Country, Aboriginal & Pacific Art Gallery, Sydney
- 2006: Pussycat: The Sorcerer, Aboriginal & Pacific Art Gallery, Sydney
- 2021: Philip Gudthaykudthay – The Pussycat and the Kangaroo, 23 paintings created between 2005 and 2019, curated by Djon Mundine, at the Commercial Gallery, Sydney

== Collections ==
Gudthaykudthay's work is represented in many galleries in Australia, including university and state collections, as well as internationally. These include:

- National Gallery of Australia, Canberra
- National Gallery of Victoria, Melbourne
- Parliament House Art Collection, Canberra
- Museum and Art Gallery of the Northern Territory, Darwin
- Museum of Contemporary Art Australia, Ramingining Collection, Sydney
- Queensland Art Gallery, Brisbane
- Artbank, Sydney
- Art Gallery of New South Wales, Sydney
- Art Gallery of South Australia, Adelaide
- Ganter Myer Collection, Melbourne
- Milingimbi Collection, Milingimbi Educational and Cultural Association
- Charles Darwin University, Darwin
- Flinders University Art Museum, Adelaide
- Queensland University of Technology Art Museum, Brisbane
- University of Queensland, Anthropology Museum, St Lucia
- British Museum, London
- Kluge-Ruhe Aboriginal Art Collection at the University of Virginia
- Seattle Art Museum
- Linden Museum, Stuttgart, Germany
- Museum of Mankind, British Museum, London
- British Museum, Department of Africa, Oceania and the Americas, London
- Aboriginal Art Museum, Utrecht, The Netherlands
