= Milirrpum Marika =

Australian aboriginal artist

Mathaman Marika
- Born: c.1923
- Died: 7 November 1983
- Other name: Jacky Marika
- Children: Wanyubi
- Relatives: Mawalan 1 Marika, Mathaman Marika, Roy Dadaynga Marika, Dhunggala Marika (brothers)

Milirrpum Marika (c.1923 – 7 November 1983), also known as Jacky and also referred to simply as Milirrpum, was a Yolngu artist and community leader from East Arnhem Land, Northern Territory of Australia. He was best known for his involvement in the landmark court case Milirrpum v Nabalco Pty Ltd (1971), aka the Gove land rights case, which was the first significant legal case for Indigenous land right and native title in Australia and led to the federal Aboriginal Land Rights (Northern Territory) Act 1976.

He was the younger brother of artists and activists Mawalan 1 Marika and Mathaman Marika, with Roy Dadaynga Marika being the next youngest, and there was also a sister, Dhunggala. The family belongs to the Rirratjingu clan of the Dhuwa moiety, and lived at Yirrkala. His country is Yalangbara, and language Dhangu.

He produced most of his artworks after 1960, which were represented in exhibitions during his lifetime and are held in several collections today, although due to his other commitments he was not as prolific an artist as his brothers. His media included using ochres in bark paintings, and his special themes were Djambuwal the Thunderman, and the creation story of the Djang'kawu sisters.

Milirrpum and his four brothers led the other clans in presenting the Yirrkala bark petitions to the Australian Government, in the lead-up to the Gove case.

He was an important community leader who led clan ceremonies from the 1970s until his death, with younger brother Roy taking over his duties in 1983.

He died on 7 November 1983.

His son is Wanyubi Marika (born 1967), also an artist.

== Collections ==
Marika's work is held in the following galleries:

- Berndt Museum of Anthropology, University of Western Australia in Perth
- Buku-Larrnggay Arts Museum, Yirrkala
- Museum and Art Gallery of the Northern Territory, Darwin
- National Gallery of Victoria, Melbourne
- Tasmanian Museum and Art Gallery, Hobart
- Kelton Foundation, Santa Monica, U.S.
