= Mary Dhalapany =

Aboriginal Australian artist and weaver

Mary Dhapalany
- Born: 1953 (age 72–73); North East Arnhem Land, Northern Territory, Australia
- Known for: weaving, fibre art, contemporary Indigenous Australian art Australian Aboriginal fibrecraft Australian Aboriginal fibre sculpture
- Relatives: David Gulpilil, Peter Minygululu, Djelirr, Belinda Gunydjulma, and Evonne Munuyngu

Mary Dhapalany (born 1953), skin name Bilinydjan, also known as Mary Dhapalany Mangul, is an Indigenous Australian contemporary artist based in Ramingining, Australia in Arnhem Land. She is of the Yolŋu people from the Mandhalpuy clan, of the Dhuwa moiety. She is a renowned Aboriginal Australian fibre-artist.

== Bibliography ==
Dhapalany was born in 1953 with her twin brother David Gulpilil, a renowned Aboriginal actor and dancer. She learned her own weaving practice from her grandmother. Her family members were active members of the arts community. Her brother, Peter Minygululu is an artist making bark carvings and bark paintings. Her sister, Evonne Munuyngu works alongside Mary in modern weaving practices.

== Art career ==
Dhapalany has worked with the local art centre, Bula'Bula Arts, creating fine art weavings for years. Recently, Mary works at the outstation of Gupulul and returns to the community centre to gather supplies. She makes a number of different fibre works including decorative nganiyal (conical mats), fish traps, mewana, and many others which are steeped in Aboriginal ceremonial importance. She is best known for reinvigorating classic weaving designs with unique combinations of saturated dyes she creates herself.

Recently, her intricate weavings have been shown in contemporary art exhibitions. She has worked with her sister Evonne and several other Aboriginal people in collaboration with the National Gallery of Victoria to create the 2022 inaugural Indigenous Fashion Commission. Aboriginal weavers created the bodice for a gown using woven, hand-dyed pandanus fibres shown in Vogue Australia.

== Weaving practice in Arnhem Land ==
The weaving process begins with gathering pandanus spiralis or gunga. Women gather in groups to collect pandanus, bringing hooked sticks and knives to procure the leaves. They look for fresh, long leaves without holes or cracks in the middle. Sometimes at the same time, they collect natural materials to dye the leaves later such as roots and flowers.

The collected leaves are then spread out on a cloth and parted into strips. The prickly edges are removed and the leaves are split into a usable size. The Aboriginal weavers do all this by hand receiving the needed training from their ancestors who passed down the knowledge of how to prepare pandanus and use them in weaving. The stripped strands are then placed in the sun to dry for a few hours, making them stronger fibres. The dried leaves are bundled together for the dying.

Natural dyes are used to colour pandanus for aesthetic purposes. Commonly used dyes are red and yellow made respectively from borkpili plant roots and yiriŋaniŋ grass roots. The plant material is then ground up and boiled with the dried pandanus colouring them vibrantly.

The fibres are ready to use in weavings now. The fibres are woven into whatever the artist desires. Things created can be utilitarian, for decoration, or for ceremonial purposes. Recently, Aboriginal Artists like Lena Yarinkura have been expanding traditional weaving practices by creating sculptural narrative works.

Dr. Louise Hamby, a scholar on natural fibre works in Arnhem Land, suggests four main reasons for creating fibre arts. The first is their essential role in ceremonial practice. For example, on certain occasions, dillybags are used to carry sacred objects and cultural significance. Another purpose for fibre art creation is the social environment it brings. Women and children gather and work together in the creation process and elders share critical cultural knowledge of history and creation practice. With this idea, creating fibre arts is done to maintain cultural knowledge and preserve traditional techniques for further generations. Lastly, the production of fibre art is a job and is done for economic purposes.

== Film career ==
Alongside her siblings, Peter Mingyululu and David Gulpilil, Dhapalany starred in the 2006 film Ten Canoes, known as the first film created entirely in an Aboriginal language.

== Awards ==
- National Indigenous Fashion Award 2020
- Finalist in the 2020 National Aboriginal and Torres Strait Islander Art Awards
- Finalist in the 2023 National Aboriginal and Torres Strait Islander Art Awards

Year	Nominee / work	Award	Result
2020	Mary Dhapalany Mangul, Margaret Djarbaalabal Malibirr, Evonne Muyuyngu, and Julie Shaw	National Indigenous Fashion Awards	Awarded

== Art collections ==
Dhapalany is represented in many major public collections, including:

- Biennale of Sydney
- Aichi Triennale 2022 Still Alive
- National Gallery of Victoria
- Jam Factory
- MAARA Collective
- Kathmandu Triennale 2077
- Garden of Six Seasons
- Garden of Ten Seasons
- Dalkari (ancestral footprints) at National Trust of Australia (NT)
- Beaver Galleries
- National Gallery of Victoria 2017 Triennial
- Darwin Aboriginal Art Fair
