= Mirrngadja, Northern Territory =

Coordinates: 12°39′S 135°11′E

Mirrngadja is a village in north-eastern Arnhem Land, in the Top End of the Northern Territory of Australia. It lies south-east of, and close to, the Arafura Swamp and the Arafura Jungles.
