= Wawalag =

Creation spirits recognised by some Indigenous Australians

Wawalag Sisters
Creature information
- Other name(s): Waggilak, Wauwaluk, Wawilak, Wagilag or Wawalik
- Grouping: Dhua moiety of the Yolngu people
- Similar entities: Djanggawul siblings

Origin
- Country: Australia
- Region: Arnhem Land, Northern Territory
- Details: Djangka-Bu (spirit name)

The Wawalag sisters, also written as Wauwaluk Wawilak Waggilak, Wagilag, or Wawalik, are ancestral creator beings whose story is part of widespread sacred rituals in the Aboriginal culture from Arnhem land, Northern Territory, Australia.

The story takes place in Dreamtime, a period of time in Aboriginal belief where ancestral beings created the land as well as the social and linguistic structures in it. The sisters are said to have helped draw linguistic and social differences amongst the clans in Arnhem Land, but the ceremonies associated with their stories create cultural unity.

According to the story, the sisters were travelling to the Arafura Sea, but had to stop as the elder sister was about to have a baby and needed to rest. Later on, the elder sister goes in the river to bathe with her child and the smell of afterbirth blood awakens Yulunggur, the Rainbow Serpent, who then comes out of its waterhole and swallows both sisters and the baby.

An understanding of a common narrative was developed through field-research by archaeologists such as Catherine Berndt, Lloyd Warner, and Ronald Berndt during the mid-1990s. Since then there has been an increase in the representation of the story through Aboriginal artwork that attempts to show the complexity of the story, and how it cannot be limited to the western idea of chronological storytelling.

== Narrative ==
The story of the Wawalag (Wauwaluk, Wawilak, Waggilak, Wagilag, Wawalik) sisters takes place in Dreamtime, a period of time in Aboriginal belief where ancestral beings created the land as well as the social and linguistic structures in it. The sisters are said to have helped draw linguistic and social differences amongst the clans in Arnhem Land, but the ceremonies associated with their stories create cultural unity. The story varies across the different linguistic regions in Arnhem land, but they all share a similar pattern that explains the origins of the Djungguwan, Gunabibi and Ulmark rituals, three sacred ceremonies associated with fertility, marriage and age-grading. During these ceremonies each clan reveals more details about their version of the story through songs, dances and paintings; but access to these rituals is usually limited to initiated Dua males only.

An understanding of a common narrative was developed through field-research by archaeologists such as Catherine Berndt, Lloyd Warner and Ronald Berndt during the mid-1990s.

The myth tends to be told as a group of related events rather than a continuous narrative that follows a linear structure.

=== The storyline ===
It is said that the sisters were travelling from the south of Arnhem Land to the Arafura Sea, walking only through territory of Dua moiety. They gathered plants and animals along the way to prepare and eat later. They stop to rest and set camp near the Mirrirmina waterhole where the elder sister gives birth. While the younger sister prepared a fire to cook the food they had gathered, the elder sister takes the baby near the water to bathe him. Some of the residual afterbirth blood goes in the waterhole where Yurlunggur, the rainbow serpent, resides and attracts its attention. The food the younger sister was preparing comes back to life and crawls away from the fire and into the waterhole. The serpent removes a rock that was lying at the bottom of the well and throws it onto the land, the well starts filling up with more water and the land begins to flood. A dark cloud forms on top of where the sisters had set camp and a thunderstorm begins. Unaware that it was the snake causing the thunderstorm and the flooding, they build a hut to protect themselves.

When the sisters see Yurlunggur crawl out of its waterhole, they start singing the sacred songs, which are now part of the Djungguan, Ulmark, and Gunabibi ceremonies, in an attempt to keep the snake away. They continue to sing and dance, taking turns until the storm appears to ease, exhausted the sister seek refuge in the hut where they fall asleep. The serpent enters the hut and swallows both sisters and the baby, then it rises up to the sky and proceeds to finish singing the songs the sister were singing.

After swallowing the sisters and the baby, Yurlunggur and other totemic snakes gather together to tell one another what they had eaten. The snakes realise that they were not speaking the same dialect but despite this they could still communicate using the sacred songs. At first, Yulunggur tries to hide that he/she had eaten the sisters and their baby but he/she, feeling unwell, admits the truth and regurgitates them. The serpent swallows and regurgitates them again, and the third time he/she swallows them and takes them back to Wawilak country where he spits out the two sisters which then turn to stone

=== Regional variations ===
Each clan of Dua moiety has its own version of the story as the songs, dances and painting used to tell the story changes according to the relationship the ancestral beings had with the clan's land. The most common differences amongst the various interpretations are the places in which the sisters camped and the combination of plants and animals they gathered along the way. This is determined by the geographical location of a clan, as these details are often changed to make it more relatable to their context by using the animals and territory they are familiar with. The group of events that each clan has access to or ownership of also varies, meaning that the more clans a person is affiliated to, the more knowledge about the story they will have. People affiliated to the Marrakulu clan country, for example, have knowledge that focuses on the journey of the sisters from Nilitji to Guaka'wuy, where it is said that they encounter the first ancestral people of Australia, also known as Djuwany people.

== Characteristics and associations ==
The sisters were from Ngukurr and they were part of the Wawalak clan which belongs to the Dua moiety, one of the many Australian Aboriginal kinship groups of the Yolngu people. Most commonly, the elder sister, Waimariwi, is pregnant while the younger one, Boaliri, is going through early puberty. In other versions, the younger sister is pregnant while the elder sister already has a baby that is around two to three years old. It is unclear what gender the baby is as it is addressed as both male and female. They were creation beings who travelled through Arnhem Land performing song and dance cycles that revealed, for the first time, the names of the places they were walking through and the plants and animals they gathered along the way. Because of this, they are associated with the development of moieties and language in Arnhem Land.

=== Moieties ===
The myth is closely associated with the importance of moieties and the avoidance practices that go along with them. In Arnhem Land, the Yolngu clans are divided into two moieties, Dua, also known as Dhuwa, and Yirritja. According to the story, the sisters only travel through Dua territory, meaning that everything they encountered also share the same moiety. In some versions of the story, there is a strong focus on the pregnancy being a result of an incestuous relationship between the elder sister and a Dua clansmen; while they may not be directly related, they share the same moiety, which is why the act is frowned upon. When the baby is born, the sisters encounter for the first time something that does not belong to the Dhua moiety, as children take the opposite moiety from their mother's, making the baby Yirritja.

Similarly, the Rainbow Serpent swallowing the sisters is also seen as an act of incest, as the serpent is also of Dua moiety. While it is unclear if Yulunggur, the serpent, is male or female because it is often referred to as both, the encounter between he/she and the sisters is often interpreted as a symbolism of sex.

=== Language ===
The story is also associated with the origin of linguistic differences in Arnhem Land. During their journey, the sisters were singing and naming the different plants and animals they were gathering as well as the territories they were passing through. They do this by using a range of dialects including Djaun, Rainbarngo, Djimba, Wawilak, and Liaalaomir. The emergence of linguistic differences is mainly addressed at the end of the story, when Yulunggur gathers with the other totemic serpents and realises that they speak different dialects.

== Role in traditional culture ==
=== Rituals and ceremonies ===
The story of these ancestral beings forms the basis of sacred rituals that are widespread across Arnhem Land. The story of the sisters embody what the clans consider their religious law and it is traditionally told through paintings, sculptures, song and dance cycles. These sacred laws, also referred to as madayin, are specific to each clan and they are taught during three ceremonies. Because of the sacred nature of these rituals, there is a restricted access to them and a limited understanding of the knowledge shared during them.

Djungguwan is considered the initiation ritual when young boys from the Dua moiety are circumcised and introduced to the cultural laws of their clan through the story of the sisters. In the narrative, the gender of the babies is ambiguous, sometimes they are referred to as sons or daughters, because they are yet to be circumcised. The removal of the foreskin marks the separation of what is considered the 'female part of male infants' Dua men and women come together to perform dance and song cycles which represent the snake awakening when it smelled the blood and exited the waterhole to make its way to the sisters’ hut. In 1966 footage of the ceremony was captured, parts of the ritual were not shown as they are only accessible for those taking part in the ritual or initiated Dua men.

Gunabibi is a fertility ritual that is done during dry season; the song and dance cycles focus on recreating the part of the story where the land was flooding because of the rain. The transition from dry season to wet is often seen as a symbol of fertility in the story, making this the main focus of this ritual. For weeks, both men and women perform together non-sacred songs until the bullroarer is turned, representing the voice of Yurlunggur.

Ulmark ceremony, also known as Ngurlmak, is the final ceremony and while it involves other myths, it "re-emphasizes the fertility elements and the bisexual symbolism already present in the first two" ceremonies.

These rituals belong to the Dhua moiety which means that the clans affiliated to it are the owners and custodians of the knowledge shared during them. However, clans of the Yirritja moiety are involved during some parts of these rituals

=== Totems and paintings ===
During these rituals, wooden sculptures and bark paintings are used as mnemonic devices to tell parts of the story and or represent the sisters. Some of these objects are considered sacred and can only be accessed and made by a select group of men. What limits how public the display of these objects can be is the ceremonial context not the design itself. The process behind making the wood-cravings is lengthy, a lot of detail goes into the totemic painting as the specific pattern and colours used is what symbolises the connection with the ancestral being. These painted designs can be used and adapted to other media, such as bark painting, sand sculpture, body painting, etc. Because the story varies among clans depending on their geographical origin, the design used also changes to fit their interpretation.

=== Sacred sites ===
Some of the locations mentioned in the story are considered ceremonial grounds while others have become sacred sites that cannot be visited. For example, the Mirrimina waterhole, which is where the sisters last camped before being swallowed by the serpent, can only be visited by elder clansmen. The Liaalaomir, Gunabibi and Ulmark dancing grounds, which according to the story were made by the impact of Yurlunggur falling sick to the ground after swallowing the sisters and their babies, are considered sacred territory where ceremonies are held.

== Modern art and representation ==
Since the late 1990s there has been a shift in the way knowledge about the story is shared, making it more accessible to people outside of the Indigenous community from Arnhem Land, creating a better understanding of Aboriginal culture. There are still strong restrictions as to what type of knowledge can be shared, and the design and patterns used in the artistic representation of the story require pre-existing knowledge of the context to be fully understood; this helps maintain certain aspects private. Artists will often accompany their work with a brief description of the story but will avoid going into detail to respect the parts of the story that are considered sacred.

The exhibition The Painters of the Wagilag Sisters story 1937-1997 was an exhibition of the work of more than 100 Aboriginal artists held at the National Gallery of Australia in Canberra. It was curated by Nigel Lendon and Tim Bonyhady. Artists represented in the exhibition included:

- Mawalan Marika, prominent artist and senior member of the Rirratjingu clan, who was also custodian of Djang'kawu stories and ceremonies
- Ramingining artist Philip Gudthaykudthay (aka "Pussycat")

== See also ==
- Djanggawul, another Dua creation story
