= Arafura Jungles =

The Arafura Jungles form a site with an area of about 5000 ha in eastern Arnhem Land, in the Top End of the Northern Territory of Australia. It contains twelve patches of monsoon vine forest of areas varying from 1.5 ha to 50 ha, representing four distinct floristic types, in the sandstone escarpment bordering the eastern edge of the Arafura Swamp, 12 km north of Mirrngadja. It is listed on the now-defunct Register of the National Estate.

== Vegetation ==
The patches are of both wet and dry jungles, with the wet typically occupying sheltered spring or creek fed sites in gorges, and with the dry occupying less sheltered sites on cliffs and scree slopes that receive no water during the dry season. Plants of conservation significance include the ferns Angiopteris evecta and Adiantum aethiopicum, the vine Freycinettia percostata and the orchid Didymoplexus pallens.
