= Mawalan Marika =

Australian Aboriginal painter, ca. 1908-1967

- Born: c.1908 Yirrkala, Northern Territory, Australia
- Died: 26 November 1967
- Known for: Bark paintings, wood carvings, political activism
- Children: Wandjuk Marika (son); Banduk Marika (daughter); Dhuwarrwarr Marika (daughter); Banygul (daughter) (Note: The spelling "Bayngul" is also seen, possibly a typographical error) and Laklak
- Relatives: Mathaman Marika, Milirrpum Marika, Roy Dadaynga Marika, Dhunggala Marika (brothers)

Mawalan Marika (c.1908 – 26 November 1967), often referred to as Mawalan 1 Marika to distinguish from Mawalan 2 Marika, was an Aboriginal Australian artist and the leader of the Rirratjingu clan of the Yolngu people of north-east Arnhem Land, in the Northern Territory of Australia. He is known for his bark paintings, carvings and political activism. Mawalan Marika, as one of the early leaders of the Yirrkala bark painting movement, played a critical role in using art both as a means of cultural expression and as a political tool to assert Yolŋu land rights.

== Early life ==
Mawalan Marika was born around 1908 in Yirrkala, in northeast Arnhem Land, Northern Territory. His name derives from the mawalan, or digging stick used by the Djang'kawu of the creation story of the Rirratjingu clan. His clan falls under the Dhuwa moiety, one of the two moieties found in Arnhem Land. He is often referred to as Mawalan 1 Marika, to distinguish from his grandson Mawalan 2 Marika, born in 1957.

== Activism and the Yirrkala Bark Petitions of 1963 ==
In addition to being an important asset to many anthropologists, including Charles P. Mountford and Ronald Berndt, Mawalan Marika was one of the most prominent political activists of his time.

In July 1963, political figures Kim Beazley Sr., chairman of the Committee on the Aborigines and Papuans, and Gordon Bryant, chairman of the Federal Council for Aboriginal Advancement, visited the people of Yirrkala. During this visit, the local Yolgnu people showed them sacred places around Yirrkala, and explained the sacred rights of the land entitled to the Aboriginal people. After receiving this tour, Beazley urged the Aboriginal people to create a petition to be sent to parliament in order to protect their land rights from the continuing creation of mining projects on Aboriginal land. During the drafting of the petition, Reverend Edgar Wells urged the community to have the petition be the work of solely the Aboriginal people, so that the government would not write off the petition as being written by non-Aboriginal people.

As the petition was drafted, the Aboriginal writers brainstormed the information themselves, but consulted local ministry teachers for help in conveying the same message in both English and Gumatj. The only outside aid needed from the people in creating the petitions was in finding a suitable typewriter to print the petitions as the one belonging to Wandjuk Marika was not suitable. The surrounding border of the petitions consisted of bark paintings created by elders in Yirrkala. The elders created the border in order to be a part of the petition process even if they were unable to sign their names on the petition. After the creation of the bark paintings, the petition was printed and glued onto the bark. In total, eight copies of the petition text were created, with four being glued onto bark. At the bottom of the petition, nine Aboriginal men and three Aboriginal women signed and represented an estimated 500 people on the mining-affected land.

Mawalan and his four brothers led the other clans in presenting the Yirrkala bark petitions to the Australian Government on 14 August 14, 1963, and directly contributed to the formation of the 1971 Gove land rights case (aka Milirrpum v Nabalco Pty Ltd, named after his brother Milirrpum). Contemporary accounts confirm that the petitions were conceived and authored by the Marika brothers, the traditional landowners affected by the mining lease, rather than later figures like Galarrwuy Yunupingu or his son, who has previously been attributed as the author of these impactful documents.

In October 1963 Marika and 11 other Yolŋu leaders presented evidence in front of the Commonwealth Parliament's Select Committee of Inquiry into the Grievances of the Yirrkala Aborigines, Arnhem Land Reserve. Prior to this, the Select Committee was described as having key doubts on the mental capabilities of the Aboriginal people and quite ready to disregard their petition due to these racist beliefs. However, Marika and his companions handled the testimony and cross-examination with grace. Marika's testimony, along with that of his brothers and other clan leaders, emphasised not only the cultural and spiritual importance of the land but also the need for Yolŋu inclusion in economic development and decision-making around mining. The hearings highlighted his role as a key figure in Yolŋu political leadership, advocating for both cultural rights and practical compensation for his people.

Following the testimony and cross-examination of Marika and his brothers, the Select Committee reported to the government on their findings and unanimous action recommendations on 29 October 1963. Key findings and recommendations stood out: the committee found that the administration was not telling the truth when it reported that the Aboriginal people had been told and consulted about the mining projects prior to their approval; there were sacred areas that belonged to the Aboriginal people; and, prior to the mining project beginning, the Aboriginal people were not asked where these sacred sites were. Adding a comment on the mental capabilities of the Aboriginal people that they did not previously anticipate, the committee wrote how the Aboriginal people needed to be paid A$150,000 in royalties as monetary compensation for their loss of land.

While the report did not grant the land back to its rightful owners and allowed mining activity to continue, it was a stepping stone to further progress in Aboriginal land rights. Later, in 1968, the first native title litigation in the history of Australia was brought to the Northern Territory Supreme Court in Milirrpum v Nabalco Pty Ltd. Mawalan and his brothers were key parts in this court case. While this Supreme Court case was ultimately not successful, the case led directly to the Aboriginal Land Rights (Northern Territory) Act 1976. This act gave the Arnhem Land reserve back to the Aboriginal owners, but allowed the land leased to the mining company to still be under control of the mining company.

== Career ==
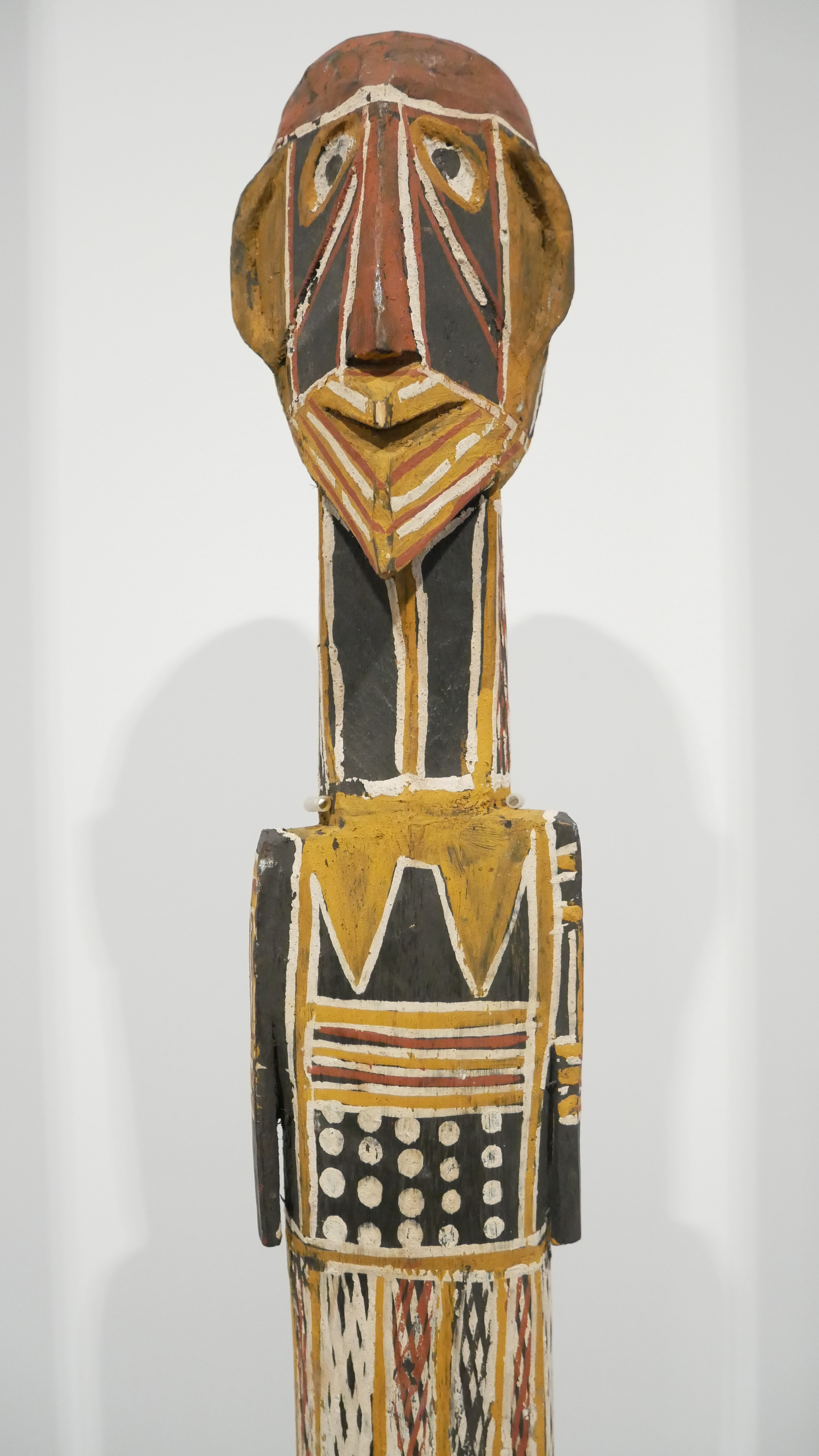
Female spirit figure with body painting（1948）

Marika painted over 40 works, many of which can be found in art collections of museums or private collectors. In the 1950s, he helped to create a commercial bark painting environment at the Yirrkala mission and collaborated in the creation of the Yirrkala Church Panels in 1963. Because Marika is from the Rirratjingu clan, many of his bark paintings allude to the two ancestral figures of the clan, Mururruma the great turtle-hunter and Djambuwal the Thunderman. In his work, Turtle Dreaming, Marika demonstrates the connection between the two ancestral figures through long pointed shapes representing the water spouts created by the Thunderman and rocks containing Mururruma's spirit. One of Marika's figurative traits is that he often paints the Djang'kawu sisters, who are said to be the creator beings of the Dhuwa moiety. The Marika family see themselves as direct descendants of the Djang'kawu. Mawalan created an entire series of paintings detailing the journey on the Djang'kawu sisters into country. A collection of Marika's bark paintings entitled Djan'kawu story (1959) is held by the Art Gallery of New South Wales. The Djang’kawu narratives underpinning the art of Yalangbara articulate both spiritual identity and rights to land, reaffirmed through generations of Yolŋu artists.

As well as being known for his bark paintings, Marika had a high level of skill in carving and sculpture. Many of Marika’s early bark paintings closely follow the structural format of Yolŋu body paintings, with symmetrical designs that often replicate the orientation and visual flow of ceremonial chest painting. His sculptures are cleanly painted with clan designs and finished with feathers, human hair, or other such natural attachments. The artworks reveal a dynamic dialogue between ancestral narratives and contemporary experiences, affirming that remote Aboriginal communities continue to innovate while maintaining strong cultural traditions.

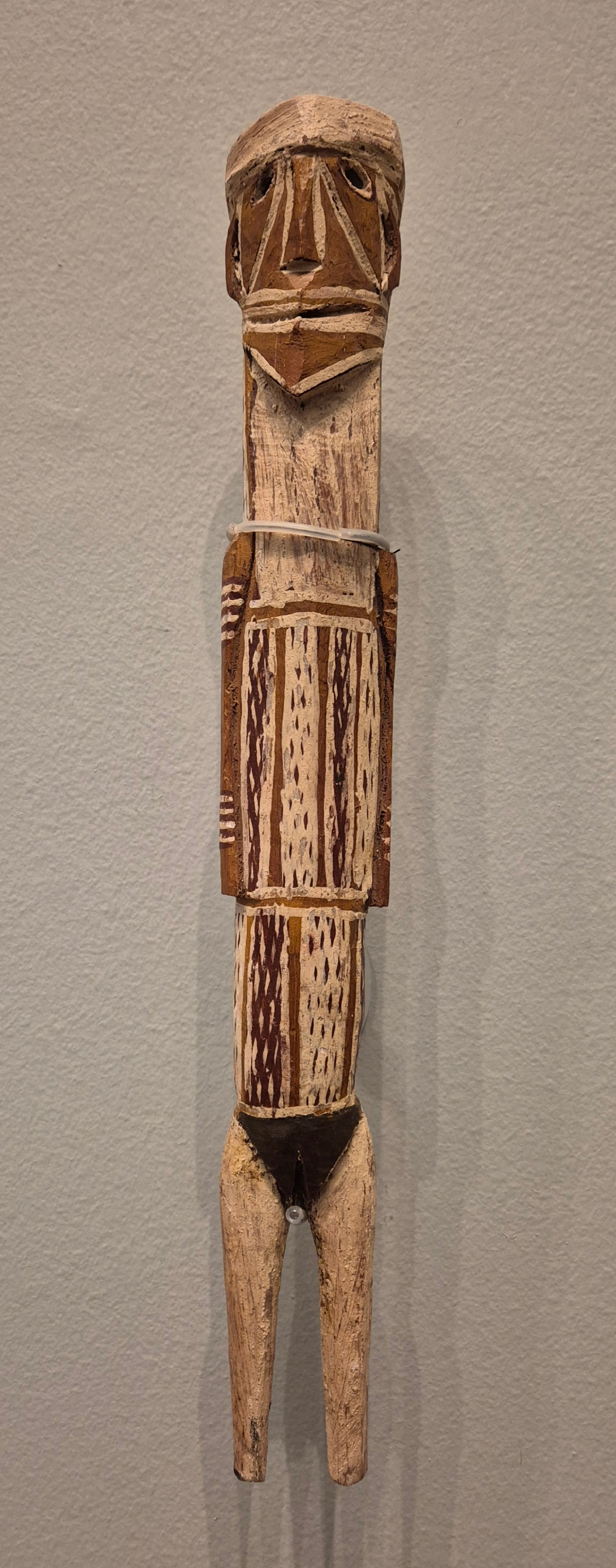
"Gumurrwaymi" (The woman of Bremer Island) (1952)

His style is characteristic of the Dhuwa moiety, featuring many dots, diagonal lines, and geometric/diamond shapes. One of the innovations for which Marika is credited is the use of episodic or panel style bark paintings and breaking away from the use of rarrk by using dotting techniques and more figural elements. A notable trait of many of his paintings is the striking use of yellow ochre, which features heavily in all his works, sculptural and painted. Many of his works deal with subjects relating to the sacred stories and ceremonies of the clan. He often distinguished overlapping figures by using contrasts between curved and straight lines, or rounded and angular shapes. These visual techniques added rhythm and a clear narrative structure to his compositions, particularly in works like The Wagilag Sisters.

As one of the early leaders of the Yirrkala bark painting movement, he played a critical role in using art both as a means of cultural expression and as a political tool to assert Yolŋu land rights.

Marika's influence extended beyond Australia. In 1960, Pablo Picasso is said to have sent a letter to the Yirrkala Mission expressing his admiration for Marika’s work and his envy of the artist's ability to produce such powerful images, a gesture that highlights the global artistic impact of Yolŋu bark painting.

Marika was one of the first artists to break from tradition and teach his daughters (i.e. women) how to paint the sacred madayin clan designs. Marika advocated for the teaching of Yolŋu culture to the general Australian population, and negotiated the foundation of a Methodist mission at Yirrkala in 1935. One way he tried to encourage this transmission of knowledge was the establishment of commercial production of bark paintings through the mission. Marika’s works were among those recorded and catalogued during the 1948 American-Australian Scientific Expedition to Arnhem Land, an event that helped introduce Yolŋu art to a broader anthropological audience.

== Works ==
In 1959, the deputy director of the Art Gallery of New South Wales, Tony Tuckson, traveled to Yirrkala to commission large scale works for the collection for the aesthetic rather than the ethnographic value. Five large paintings by Mawalan Marika using natural pigments on eucalyptus bark became part of the collection, which depicted the Djan'kawu journey: a group of siblings who journeyed from the spirit world. These bark paintings by Marika are considered among the most significant early examples of Yolŋu fine art to enter an Australian state collection. Their acquisition by the Art Gallery of New South Wales was critical in shifting perceptions of bark painting from indigenous artifact to fine art. The first of this series, Djan'kawu Creation Story 1, is part of the Madayin collection at the Kluge-Ruhe Aboriginal Art Collection in Charlottesville, Virginia.

In addition to the Djan'kawu Creation Story bark panels, Marika produced crayon drawings that depicted key Yolŋu ancestral stories. One 1946 work, The Journey of the Djan’kawu from Burralku to Yalangbara, maps the path of the Djan’kawu sisters as they traveled from the spirit island to the mainland, creating the landscape and giving birth to clan ancestors. The drawing layers figures, animals, and ceremonial objects across the composition, visually linking each site and event along their journey. Another 1946 drawing, The Creative Acts and Ceremonial Forms of the Djan’kawu, emotively expresses the moment of ancestral birthing at Yalangbara through the use of glowing red color and ceremonial motifs. The drawing reflects how Yolŋu culture ties themes of power and fertility to public ritual.

Gulbingoi Rock (lorikeets) and Garingan Rock is a bark painting by Marika that uses sacred Rirratjingu clan designs connected to the Djan’kawu sisters. It was collected by Ronald Berndt in 1946. The central circles represent waterholes, sacred mats, and the sun, while the vertical lines show the digging sticks used by the ancestral women to shape the land. The painting reflects sacred law and is used in ceremonial contexts.

Also at the Kluge-Ruhe is his pre-1966 painting Milŋiyawuy (The Milky Way), depicting the Milky Way as a river of stars in the sky. Also painted in the traditional medium of natural pigments on eucalyptus bark, Milŋiyawuy features people playing the didjeridu and shows the Yolŋu characteristic of showing both human performance of ceremony and the spiritual domain it engages with. Aboriginal paintings are not simply decorative objects but are deeply embedded in a framework of religious beliefs, laws, and the transmission of cultural knowledge. For the Yolŋu people, the land and the law are inseparable, and art becomes a primary means of expressing and maintaining these vital connections.

== Death and legacy ==
Marika died on 26 November 1967.

His role in the Yirrkala bark petitions, and its impact on the future of Aboriginal land rights, was significant, and his many artworks continue to be displayed in collections and exhibitions around the world.

=== In Memory of Mawalan ===
In 1971, after the defeat in the Gove Land Rights Case, Wandjuk Marika organised a special ceremony to honour his father's role in the fight for land rights. Ian Dunlop created a film of the ceremony, filmed by Dean Semler, called In Memory of Mawalan, which was released in 1983. Wandjuk advised the filmmakers of the significance of the story as they were filming the ceremony. The background to the film is the story of the Djang’kawu sisters, the clan creation story that laid out the law for the people, which was ignored when the government gave permission for the mining company to start developing operations in east Arnhem Land.

== Collections ==
- Art Gallery of New South Wales, Sydney
- National Gallery of Australia, Canberra
- National Gallery of Victoria, Melbourne
- Kluge-Ruhe Aboriginal Art Collection of the University of Virginia

== Significant exhibitions ==
- Old Masters Exhibition - National Gallery of Australia
- The Art of Arnhem Land - Perth, 1957
- Dreamings - New York, 1988
- Aratjara - Europe, 1993–94
- Yalangbara: Art of the Djang'kawu - National Museum of Australia, 2010–11
