= Mosman Art Gallery =

Art gallery in Sydney, Australia

Mosman Art Gallery is the main public art gallery for the Mosman area on the north shore of Sydney, New South Wales, Australia.

The art gallery was opened in 1998 by Mosman Council. Exhibitions have covered diverse topics and subjects. The exhibitions have included first nation artists. Mosman Art Gallery manages one of Australia's most significant painting prizes, the annual Mosman Art Prize.

It also administers the Mosman Youth Art Prize.
