= Aboriginal Memorial =

Work of contemporary Indigenous Australian art

The Aboriginal Memorial
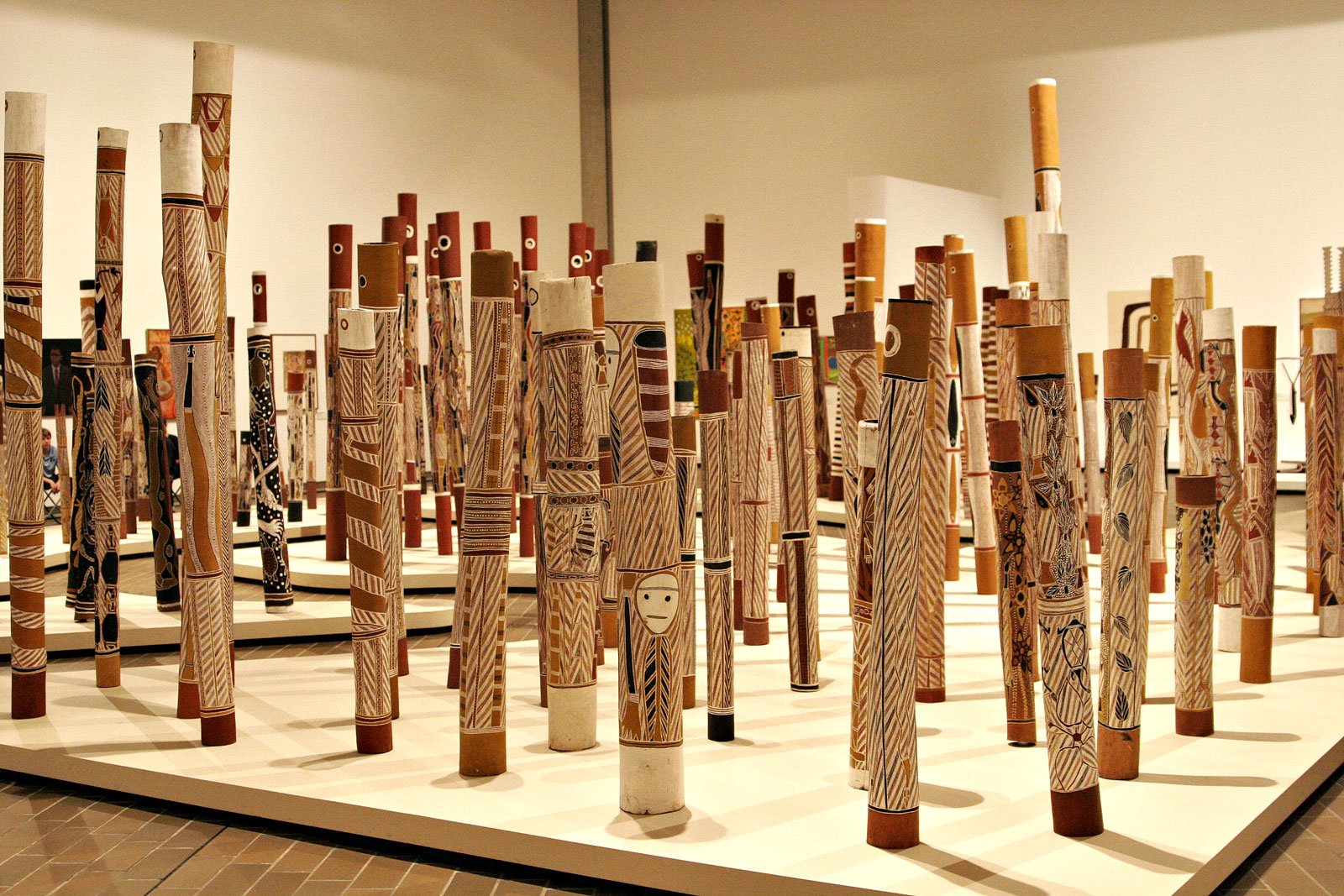
- Artists: Artists of Ramingining, central Arnhem Land, Northern Territory, Australia
- Year: 1987
- Type: Sculpture installation: natural pigments on wood
- Location: National Gallery of Australia, Canberra

The Aboriginal Memorial is a work of contemporary Indigenous Australian art from the late 1980s, and comprises 200 decorated hollow log coffins (also known as memorial poles, dupun, ḻarrakitj and other terms). It was conceived by Djon (John) Mundine in 1987–88 and realised by 43 artists from Ramingining and neighbouring communities of Central Arnhem Land, in the Northern Territory. Artists who participated in its creation included David Malangi and George Milpurrurru.

The work was created to coincide with the Australian Bicentenary and commemorates those Indigenous Australians who died as a result of European settlement. It was acquired by the National Gallery of Australia, where it is on permanent display. Its first exhibition was at the Sydney Biennale in 1988, and it was the centrepiece of an exhibition of Indigenous art at Russia's Hermitage Museum in 2000.

== Creation ==
In 1988, Australia marked 200 years since its first official white settlement, established by Captain Arthur Phillip on Sydney Harbour in 1788. While some Indigenous Australians protested the event, and referred to the occasion as Invasion Day rather than Australia Day, a group of Aboriginal artists from Ramingining in the Northern Territory decided to create an artwork to mark the anniversary. The project was initiated by Djon Mundine, an Indigenous art advisor and curator, who was working at Bula'Bula Arts at Ramingining prior to the Bicentenary. A small group of artists including David Malangi, Paddy Dhathangu, George Milpurrurru, and Jimmy Wululu decided the form of the project, but ultimately 43 artists from the region contributed pieces to the Memorial.

The work takes the form of 200 hollow log coffins, known as dupun: the number was chosen to mark the years of European settlement. Such coffins are a form of funerary art and are used throughout the Arnhem Land region for reburial ceremonies. The items displayed in Aboriginal Memorial, however, were created for the purpose of the artwork and have not at any stage contained human remains, nor been used in reburial ceremonies. The work was intended "to commemorate the thousands of Aboriginal people who had perished in the course of European settlement, and for whom it has not been possible to conduct appropriate mortuary rites". The intention behind the work drew attention in 2005 when Melbourne newspaper The Age ran an editorial asking whether it might be appropriate to commemorate Aboriginal resistance to white settlement at the Australian War Memorial, and to move the Aboriginal Memorial to that location as part of that commemoration.

Log coffins are made from trees that have been naturally hollowed out by termites. They are cut, cleaned and then painted with natural pigments during a ceremonial camp. The Aboriginal Memorial decorations reflect traditional clan designs and significant dreamings for which the artists had responsibility.

== Exhibition and critical reception ==
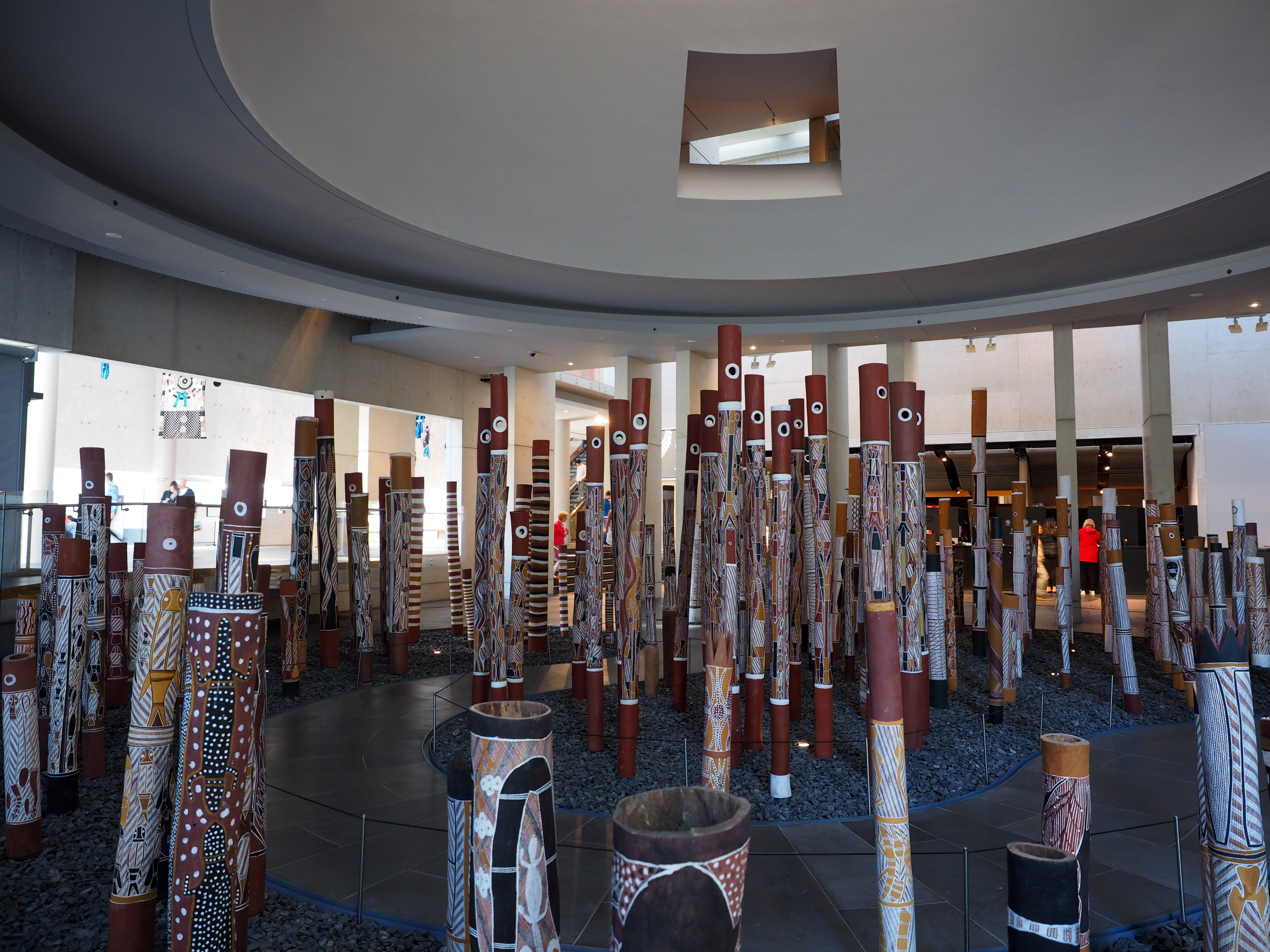
Aboriginal Memorial in 2018

The creators of the Aboriginal Memorial always intended that it be publicly displayed, and in 1987 the work was offered to the National Gallery of Australia, which helped fund its completion. After being first exhibited at the Sydney Biennale in 1988, it was moved to the National Gallery, its present home. In 2000, the Memorial formed the centrepiece of a major exhibition of Australian Indigenous art held in the prestigious Nicholas Hall at the Hermitage Museum in Russia. The exhibition received a positive reception from Russian critics, one of whom wrote:

This is an exhibition of contemporary art, not in the sense that it was done recently, but in that it is cased in the mentality, technology and philosophy of radical art of the most recent times. No one, other than the Aborigines of Australia, has succeeded in exhibiting such art at the Hermitage.

Described as an icon of the National Gallery's collection, and "one of the outstanding works of art to have been created in Australia", the memorial is laid out with a central pathway between the log-coffins representing the passage of the Glyde River through central Arnhem Land. In the late 2000s, the work was included in the list of the 20 most valuable artworks in the Gallery's collection, and was the only Australian artwork to make that list. At that time, of the 20 most valuable Australian artworks in the collection, it was also the only one by Indigenous artists. Andrew Sayers, former head of Australia's National Portrait Gallery and the National Museum of Australia, described the work as "among the most profound works of art to emerge from the last 20 years".

In the late 2000s, the work was temporarily withdrawn from display to undergo significant conservation work. Completed in October 2009, the restoration was followed by the work's relocation in 2010 to the entrance area of the new gallery building, where it was intended to be the first work seen by visitors to the gallery. Aboriginal Memorial was relocated to level 1 of the NGA in June 2022. The gallery stated that this move placed the work in the "heart of the National Gallery, helping make the most important work in the national collection central to all visitors’ art experience".

== Bibliography ==
- Caruana, Wally (2003). Aboriginal Art (2nd ed.). London: Thames & Hudson. ISBN 978-0-500-20366-8.
- Croft, Brenda L., ed. (2007). Culture Warriors: National Indigenous Art Triennial 2007. National Gallery of Australia. ISBN 978-0-642-54133-8. (National Indigenous Art Triennial catalogue by curator)
