= Ramingining, Northern Territory =

Remote community in the Northern Territory of Australia

Ramingining
- Town
- Coordinates: 12°19′42″S 134°55′40″E
- Country: Australia
- State: Northern Territory
- LGA: East Arnhem Region
- Location: 560 km (350 mi) E of Darwin

Government
  - Territory electorate: Mulka
  - Federal division: Lingiari

Population
  - Total: 814 (SAL 2021)
- Postcode: 0822

Ramingining is an Aboriginal Australian community of mainly Yolngu people in the Northern Territory, Australia, 560 kilometres (350 mi) east of Darwin. It is on the edge of the Arafura Swamp in Arnhem Land. Wulkabimirri is a tiny outstation (homeland) nearby, and Murwangi, further south, is part of the Ramingining Homelands. Marwuyu Gulparil, also known as Gulparil Marwuyu or just Marwuyu, is another remote community to the south of Ramingining.

== History ==
The community was established in the early 1970s, and became recognised as Aboriginal land with the passage of the Aboriginal Land Rights Act 1976. The place name was registered as an administrative area in 2007.

The village, along with nearby Murwangi (formerly Arafura Station, now part of Ramingining Homelands), was the source for many of the actors in the 2006 film Ten Canoes. After the film sparked worldwide interest in Yolngu and Australian Aboriginal culture, a spin-off educational project known as Twelve Canoes was created, in collaboration with the people at Ramingining, which includes a website and twelve short films. The film of the twelve segments was shown on SBS TV in Australia, and has been available online.

== Demographics ==
The population of the village in the 2016 Australian census was 811. Djambarrpuyngu is the main language in Ramingining, though Gupapuyngu, Ganalbingu, Liyagalawumirr 3.2% and Burarra are also spoken. The "SA1" geographical regions defined by the Australian Bureau of Statistics, including Ramingining and the tiny Wulkabimirri community, recorded a population of 1025.

== Outstations ==
There are a number of tiny remote settlements, also known as outstations or homelands, scattered around Ramningining. These include Yatalamarra, Wulkarimirra, Ngangalala, Mulgurram, Garanydjirr, Galadjapin, Gattji, Gelirri, Manbbirri, Bundatharri, and Gurulul.

Marwuyu Gulparil (aka Gulparil Marwuyu, or just Marwuyu) lies to the south, and takes an hour-and-a-half in a four-wheel drive and boat to get there. Marwuyu is known for being the homeland of famous actor and dancer David Gulpilil. Other outstations

== Description and facilities ==
A written permit is required to visit Ramingining. Alcohol is banned in Ramingining. It cannot be consumed by residents or visitors. Kava used to be legally available, but was banned in the entire Northern Territory in August 2007 as a part of the federal government's intervention on Indigenous affairs.

The village has an airstrip (Ramingining Airport) serviced by Fly Tiwi, a general store, a school, a police station, and a health clinic. The health clinic transitioned to a community-managed model in 2018, and is managed by Miwatj Health Aboriginal Corporation.

Ramingining school is paired with a sister school in Cockatoo, Victoria, Cockatoo Primary School. Exchange visits are organised where groups of Year 5 pupils and accompanying teachers visit Ramingining for a week. A few weeks or months later, Ramingining students from Year 5 and 6 visit Cockatoo Primary School.

A program that started in 2009 saw year nine boys from St Kevin's College in Melbourne visit Ramingining, which started a regular exchange program. Loreto Mandeville Hall in Melbourne also runs an exchange program.

== Bula'bula Arts ==
Bula'bula Arts is a community-run art centre, established in the 1980s. It is owned by the Bula'bula Arts Aboriginal Corporation (BAAC), an Aboriginal corporation which was established in 1989. Local artists decided on the name, which means "the voice/tongue of Gandayala (also reported as Garrtjambal), or red kangaroo, which is the creation being of Ramingining in The Dreaming mythology. In the local songline, Garrtjambal travelled from the Roper River to the Ramingining region, carrying a message (bula'bula). This story is represented in a number of media: as well as visual arts such as print, painting, sculpture, and fibre art, it is also carried in song and dance, as well as film and written works.

In 1984 Djon Mundine, a Bandjalung curator, writer, artist, and activist worked with the Power Gallery of Contemporary Art at the University of Sydney (now the Museum of Contemporary Art Australia) on an exhibition of over 200 artworks from Ramingining, which were later acquired by the gallery. He became art adviser to Bula'Bula shortly after its creation. In 1988 he conceived of the work Aboriginal Memorial, which was created by 43 artists at Bula'Bula for the Bicentenary of Australia. It is an installation consisting of 200 hollow log coffins (aka burial poles, or dupun), and now on permanent display at the National Gallery of Australia in Canberra.

The centre is situated at 19 Warrk Road, Ramingining. It sells works around Australia and abroad, and the artists' work has been displayed in New York City, London, and Berlin. As of April 2023 the executive director is Mel George. As of 2023 it is owned by its approximately 150 member artists, who live in Ramingining and eleven surrounding outstations of Yatalamarra, Wulkarimirra, Ngangalala, Mulgurram, Garanydjirr, Galadjapin, Gattji, Gelirri, Manbbirri, Bundatharri, and Gurulul.

Many types of arts and crafts are practised at Bula'Bula, including traditional weaving. Women such as Evonne Munuyngu and Mary Dhalapany (twin sister of actor David Gulpilil) are the centre's best-known weavers. Using machetes to cut down tall spiky pandanus leaves, they strip off the sharp edges to reveal the fibre inside, which they split. They then seek out plants such as djundom (morinda citrifolia) roots with which to dye the fibres, pulverising the flesh and boiling it all in a big pot with the pandanus fibre. They then make things such as dillybags (mindirr), mats, fish traps, and woven hats. Some of these have featured in fashion shows and in interior design.

Bula'Bula also runs traineeships for young Indigenous people, in such areas as horticulture, administration, business, and curatorship. In April 2023, a video of two young men (Ashley and Darby, whose grandfathers had been involved in founding the centre) working at the centre who filmed themselves dancing at the art centre, went viral after they posted it on Facebook and Instagram.

Designs created by Bula'Bula artists are printed on clothing, purses, and tea towels, and these, along with fibre art, sculptures, and paintings, are sold by the Museum of Contemporary Art Australia in Sydney.

=== Other artists ===
- David Malangi Daymirringu (1927-1999) was an artist at Ramingining whose work, Mortuary feast of Gurrmirringu, featured on the old Australian one-dollar note. This became the first Aboriginal copyright dispute, after the Reserve Bank of Australia had not asked permission to use the work.
- Philip Gudthaykudthay (1920s/30s–2022), was also known as "Pussycat", because the quoll, or native cat, which is part of the Milky Way Dreaming, was his totem, and his physical features resembled a cat. He participated in printmaking workshops at the centre, and became a resident painter at the centre. He often used the kangaroo motif in his work, and also painted the Wagilag sisters, goannas, echidnas, frogs, and other subjects. In 2006, he played a significant role in Rolf de Heer's film Ten Canoes.

== Tourism ==
The Northern Territory Government has provided several infrastructure grants for tourism projects in the region, which is part of the Government's plan to help drive tourism in northern parts of the state.
