= David Malangi =

Australian artist

- Born: 1927; Mulanga, Northern Territory, Australia
- Died: 19 June 1999 (aged 71–72); Yathalamarra, Northern Territory, Australia
- Other names: Dr David Daymirringu, Malanggi, Dollar Dave
- Known for: Bark painting, contemporary Indigenous Australian art

David Malangi (1927 – 19 June 1999), also known as David Malangi Daymirringu, nicknamed Dollar Dave, was an Indigenous Australian Yolngu artist from the Northern Territory. He was one of the most well-known bark painters from Arnhem Land and a significant figure in contemporary Indigenous Australian art. He became known for his work being printed without his permission on the Australian one-dollar note, which led to a copyright dispute.

== Biography ==
David Malangi was born in 1927 at Mulanga, on the east bank of the Glyde River in Central Arnhem Land, Northern Territory, where he received initiation into Manyarrngu culture during his early years spent in the area. Malangi was born into the Manharrngu, a small clan group known as the people of the mangroves. He moved with his parents at a young age to Milingimbi Island, where there was a recently established Methodist mission. He eventually settled at Yathalamarra waterhole, to which his wives and mother had connections, as Balmbi women.

He died on 19 June 1999 at Yathalamarra, also in Central Arnhem Land.

== Career ==
Malangi started taking painting seriously in the late 1950s and early 1960s, after World War II. He was a bark painter that produced images on clear, red ochre, or black backgrounds, using much broader and bolder brushstrokes than other Arnhem Land bark painters. He also often worked in wooden sculpture and painted his figures in a very similar style to his bark paintings, and was known for his incredible attention to detail, and commitment to cultural representation through his art. His works both paintings and carvings include depictions of the sea eagle, crow, snake, and goanna. Wanggarr, the original creative spirits that were responsible for forming the land and making people, were also commonly seen in his paintings. More specifically, Malangi would paint images of the Djang'kawu sisters, who were accredited with creating the Dhuwa clans, and Gurrmirringu, a male spirit whose death and funeral ritual were popular subjects in his art.

Throughout Malangi's career, many of the subjects of his paintings were key elements of the land for which he was responsible. From his father he inherited the Dhuwa lands Mulana, Nurrunyuwa, Dhämala, and Dhäbila, and from his mother he inherited the Yirritja lands around Yathalamarra billabong. His art would go through episodic periods focusing on one area at a time.

Malangi was the designated senior artist of the Manyarrngu and Djinang people and a painter at Bula'Bula Arts in Ramingining.

He was a meticulous artist who collected all the materials for his paintings himself including bark for painting, timber for carving, and several different colors of ochres and clay pigments. He also kept different grindstones dedicated to each pigment to ensure the unadulterated color of the land. When creating art to capture his mother's clan, the Balmbi clan, he used three different ochres from around Yathalamarra to represent the land and his knowledge as a matrilineal descendant of the Balmbi clan.

Malangi, unknown to many, played an active role in promoting Indigenous Australian art internationally. Malangi traveled to New York City in October 1988 to participate in a symposium held in conjunction with the Dreamings: The Art of Aboriginal Australia exhibition at the Asia Society Galleries.

=== Australian one-dollar note ===
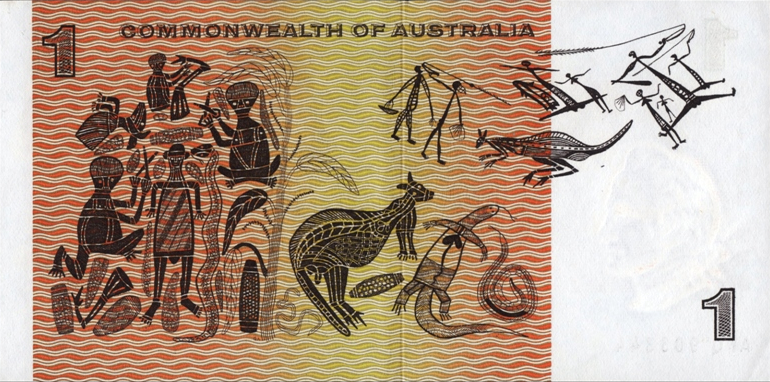
Reverse of the $1 note

The reproduction of one of his designs, depicting the mortuary feast of the ancestral hunter Gurrmirringu, appeared on the reverse of the Australian one-dollar note in 1966. This was done originally without his knowledge. The Governor of the Reserve Bank explained that it was assumed by the Australian government that the art belonged to an "anonymous and probably long dead" artist. It was acknowledged in 1967 with the release of the banknote, and he was later financially compensated after intervention by the Governor of the Reserve Bank, H. C. Coombs, as well as receiving a specially struck medal. Dr H. C. Coombs traveled to the Northern Territory himself to provide said compensation, which sparked a friendship between the two men.

The payment by the Reserve Bank to Malangi began issues of Aboriginal copyright in Australia.

Although Malangi was compensated, the story of the Australian one-dollar note brought national attention to questions of cultural ownership and recognition, particularly as Malangi's work depicted sacred elements tied to his clan's ceremonial traditions.

== Exhibitions ==
Malangi represented Australia at the São Paulo Art Biennial in 1983. He was one of the first Aboriginal artists whose work was featured in the Biennale of Sydney in 1979. In 1983 his work was exhibited at the Australian Perspecta at the Art Gallery of New South Wales, Sydney.

In 1988, for the Bicentenary of Australia, he contributed ten of 200 hollow log coffins for the Aboriginal Memorial at the National Gallery of Australia. There, he performed a regional ceremonial dance that was acceptable for the public alongside Paddy Dhatangu, Paddy Fordham Wainburranga, and Dhurrukuyu. He travelled to New York City in 1988 as part of the Dreamings exhibition of Aboriginal art.

In July 2004 an exhibition opened of David Malangi's work at the National Gallery of Australia called No Ordinary Place.

== Collections ==
- National Gallery of Australia, Canberra
- National Gallery of Victoria, Melbourne
- Kluge-Ruhe Aboriginal Art Collection, University of Virginia, Charlottesville, U.S.
- Broken Hill Regional Art Gallery, Broken Hill, New South Wales
- Museum of Contemporary Art Australia, Sydney
