= Arafura Swamp =

Inland freshwater wetland in Arnhem Land, Australia

Coordinates: 12°16′S 135°00′E

The Arafura Swamp is a large inland freshwater wetland in Arnhem Land, in the Top End of the Northern Territory of Australia. It is a near pristine floodplain with an area of 700 square kilometres (270 sq mi) that may expand to 1,300 km^{2} (500 sq mi) by the end of the wet season, making it the largest wooded swamp in the Northern Territory and, possibly, in Australia. It has a strong seasonal variation in depth of water. The area is of great cultural significance to the Yolngu people, in particular the Ramingining community. It was the filming location for the film Ten Canoes.

== Geography and climate ==
The Arafura Swamp is a large and irregular floodplain surrounded by a low plateau 60–100 metres (197–328 ft) in height, with prominent scarps to the east and west. The eastern scarp contains the Arafura Jungles site. It is laced with drainage channels and billabongs and forms a major flood-control and sedimentation basin for the Goyder-Glyde river system, with the main inflow coming from the Goyder and Gulbuwangay Rivers in the south, and with discharge northwards through the Glyde River into the Arafura Sea. It has a monsoonal tropical savanna climate with a mean annual rainfall of over 1,000 millimetres (39 in), falling mostly from December to April. In dry years much of the swamp lacks free standing water during the dry season. The average annual increase in water depth over the wet season is nearly two metres, with refilling starting in January and reaching its greatest depth in April.

== Flora and fauna ==
The Arafura Swamp contains 25 distinct plant communities, with over 100 species of grasses, herbs, aquatics, sedges and trees recorded. Most of the swamp is covered by low forest and woodland over grassland, with the dominant tree species being the paperbarks Melaleuca cajuputi and Melaleuca leucadendra.

The swamp is classified as an Important Bird Area. It is a major breeding area for magpie geese. Other abundant waterbirds include wandering whistling ducks, Pacific black ducks and green pygmy geese. There are breeding colonies of royal spoonbills, little pied and little black cormorants, and darters. Land adjacent to the swamp supports one of the largest breeding populations of the hooded parrot outside the Katherine area.

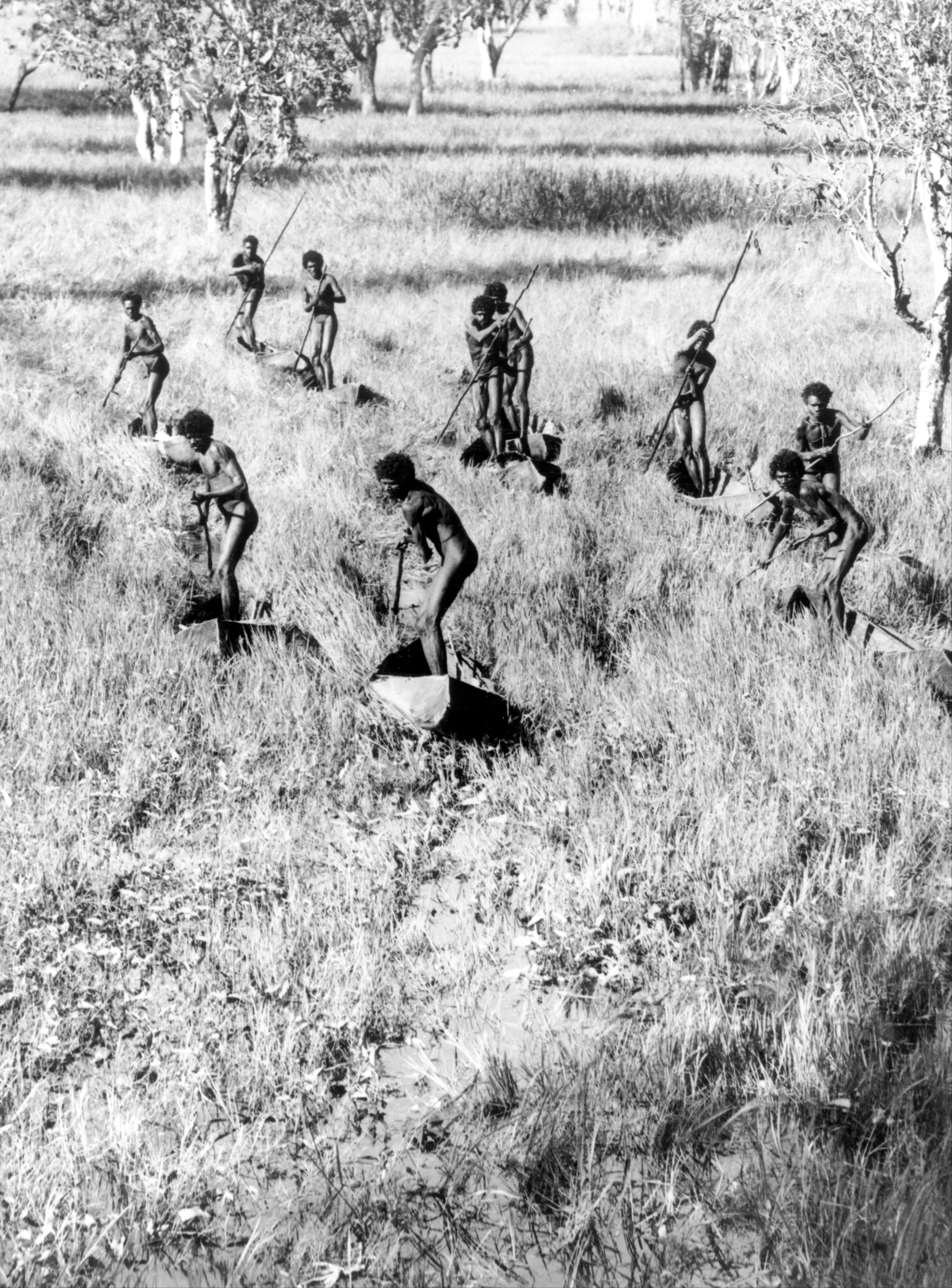
The Goose Hunters of the Arafura Swamp (1937), showing Ramingining men on the Arafura Swamp. Photo by Donald Thomson.

Large numbers of fruit bats feed and roost in the extensive paperbark forests. The threadfin rainbowfish, once known only from New Guinea and the Cape York Peninsula, has been discovered in the swamp. It is also an important breeding site for freshwater and saltwater crocodiles.

== Cultural use ==
Aboriginal people from the Ramingining community use the swamp for fishing, hunting and gathering, including harvesting the eggs of geese and crocodiles. The margins of the swamp are used for grazing livestock. The swamp is one of very few tropical wetlands in Australia continuing to be managed by Aboriginal people using traditional land management practices, including formal burning regimes. Traditional use of the swamp was studied by anthropologist Donald Thomson in the 1930s. Much of the 2006 film Ten Canoes was filmed on location in the swamp with many of the actors deriving from the local community and speaking in Yolŋu Matha.

Land tenure of the swamp is Aboriginal freehold, held by the Arnhem Land Aboriginal Land Trust. The Arafura wetlands, with their catchment area, were listed on the now-defunct Register of the National Estate.
