= Mimili Maku Arts =

Aboriginal art centre in South Australia

Mimili Maku Arts, often referred to as Mimili Maku, is an Aboriginal-owned-and-led arts centre located in the remote community of Mimili in the Anangu Pitjantjatjara Yankunytjatjara Lands, in the remote north-west of South Australia. Works produced by the centre's artists have been exhibited in institutions nationally and internationally, have won many prestigious art awards, and are highly sought after by collectors. As of 2026 the director is well-known artist Tuppy Ngintja Goodwin; other artists at the centre include or have included Betty Kuntiwa Pumani, Milatjari Pumani, Ngupulya Pumani, and Robert Fielding.

== History ==
The community of Mimili was established in the 1970s after the land was returned to the traditional owners, with the land that the community occupies previously being part of Everard Park Station. Many people lost their jobs at the station, where they undertook mustering, droving, and breaking in horses. Some had moved to the location after being displaced by the British nuclear tests at Maralinga in the 1950s.

Since then arts have emerged as an activity that significantly benefits individuals, families and communities in many significant ways, including economically, providing employment to many local people, while at the same time being culturally beneficial. Mimili Maku is one of the more recently established art centres in the region, having been established in 2010.

The gallery closed during the COVID-19 pandemic in Australia. During this time the artists worked on Robert Fielding's research project with the South Australian Museum, which focuses on intergenerational learning and cultural maintenance.

== Description ==
The name of the arts centre refers to the Maku (witchetty grub) Dreaming, which is a significant story from the area and forms a central part of many of the Mimili Maku senior artists' paintings. However, the work of the Mimili Maku artists is diverse and represents a wide range of stories and styles.

Mimili Maku involves all members of the community and the four surrounding homelands: Perentie Bore, Wanmara, Blue Hills, and Sandy Bore. Founding member and former director of the centre, Kunmanara ("Mumu Mike") Williams, said: "At Mimili Maku Arts we work together: the old men and women side by side with their children and grandchildren. This is Anangu way". As of February 2026, Tuppy Ngintja Goodwin, widow of Williams, is director of the centre. She believes that it is important for all of the Mimili artists to share their stories, "because knowledge is not held by just one person, it is held collectively by the entire community", and it is their duty to pass down the stories that have been passed down to them through the generations.

Mimili Maku is part of the APY Art Centre Collective.

== Recognition and awards ==
Works produced by the centre's artists have been exhibited in institutions nationally and internationally, have won many prestigious art awards, and are highly sought after by collectors.

Founding member Kunmanara ("Mumu Mike") Williams (1952–2019), husband of present (2026) director Tuppy Ngintja Goodwin, was posthumously awarded a Medal of the Order of Australia (OAM) on 8 June 2020 in the 2020 Queen's Birthday Honours, in recognition of his service to Indigenous visual arts and the community.

ABC News Story Lab produced a feature on Mimili Maku Arts, published on 31 January 2026.

== Artists ==
Past and present major artists at the centre include:

- Sammy Dodd (born 1948)
- Shane Dodd, who uses old rusted car parts in his art
- Robert Fielding
- Tuppy Ngintja Goodwin (finalist NATSIAA 2018)
- Betty Mula, who moved to Mimili from the Northern Territory
- Betty Kuntiwa Pumani (winner NATSIAA 2015 & 2016, Wynne Prize 2017)
- Milatjari Pumani
- Ngupulya Pumani (finalist NATSIAA 2015, finalist Wynne Prize 2017)
- Kunmanara (Mumu Mike) Williams (1952–2019)
- Pauline Wangin
- Desmond Woodforde, who is also a radio host and musician
