= Robert Fielding (artist) =

Aboriginal Australian artist

Robert Fielding (born 1969) is an Australian artist based in Mimili, South Australia. He is known for his recent series of photographs of wrecked cars and other discarded objects upon which he has painted colourful designs.

== Early life ==
Robert Fielding was born in Port Lincoln, South Australia, in 1969. His mother, Grieve Fielding, is of Afghan/Pakistani (from the early Afghan cameleers in Australia) and Western Arrernte descent. His father, Bruce Fielding was a Yankunytjatjara man from Aputula, who was forcibly removed from his home at Lilla Creek as a child (one of the Stolen Generations) and taken to Colebrook Home in Quorn, South Australia. Robert was one of 12 children.

== Career ==
Fielding works across several mediums, including installations, photography, painting, film and sculpture. and is based at Mimili Maku Arts. He has also developed skills in writing, curating, and installing exhibitions.

He conducted research in the archives of museums across Australia as part of the Australia Council for the Arts' Signature Works Innovation Lab. During the closure of APY Lands during the COVID-19 pandemic, worked on Fielding led a research project with the South Australian Museum focusing on intergenerational learning and cultural maintenance.

Fielding has created photographs of abandoned objects of modern life such as wrecked cars, decorated with Aboriginal artistic motifs and references to his community, which have featured in exhibitions, such as the installation entitled Holden On which featured in the 4th National Indigenous Art Triennial.

Fielding created a series of photographs called Mayatjara, comprising photographs of traditional owners, respected leaders and elders, advocates and artists from the APY Lands. It went on display at the Ballarat International Foto Biennale at the Art Gallery of Ballarat in 2021, and was being acquired by the National Portrait Gallery in Canberra in August 2022.

In 2023, a video installation by Fielding called Milpatjunanyi was exhibited at the Art Gallery of New South Wales. The word Milpatjunanyi "can loosely be described as the practice of marking the earth with a stick, or a bone, or a wire for storytelling... used during the recounting of Tjukurpa held within the manta, or the earth, as well as the practice of using art to recall day-to-day lived experience, sharing knowledge, local stories, both unmonumental and important".

== Recognition and awards ==
- 2015: Winner, NATSIAA Telstra Work on Paper Award
- 2015: Winner, Desart Photography Prize
- 2017: Finalist, Macquarie Group Foundation First Nations Emerging Curator Award, which gave him the opportunity to undertake an exchange to Canada
- 2017: Winner, NATSIAA Telstra Work on Paper Award
- 2019: Winner, Banyule Award for Work on Paper
- 2024: Finalist, Archibald Prize
- 2024: Finalist, Hadley's Art Prize
- 2024: Winner, Bowness Photography Prize
- 2024: Finalist, National Photographic Portrait Prize

== Personal life ==
Fielding has eight children with his partner, one of whom is musician and artist Zaachariaha Fielding, of the electronic musical duo Electric Fields.

As of August 2022 he lives at Mimili Community in Anangu Pitjantjatjara Yankunytjatjara (APY Lands).

== In film ==
Fielding is interviewed in the 2018 SBS/NITV documentary, "Voice From The Desert", part of the Our Stories series, featuring his son's duo Electric Fields.

The 2019 short film "Electric Mimili", part of the Deadly Family Portrait series, was shown on ABC Television and iview. This film, directed by Isaac Cohen Lindsay and produced by Sierra Schrader, focuses on Fielding and son Zaachariaha's family and life in Mimili, and how both father and son have been influenced by these.

== Exhibitions ==
=== Group exhibitions ===
- 2018: A Lightness of Spirit is the Measure of Happiness, at the Australian Centre for Contemporary Art in Melbourne; featuring 10 specially commissioned works by Aboriginal artists of south-east Australia, including Fielding, Vincent Namatjira, Yhonnie Scarce, Kaylene Whiskey and others.
- 2020: Tarnanthi tour of KulataTjuta (Many Spears) at the Musée des Beaux-Arts de Rennes, France
- December 2021 – March 2022: (un)learning Australia at Seoul Museum of Art, co-curated with Artspace in Sydney
- 2022: Ceremony: National Indigenous Art Triennial at the National Gallery of Australia

=== Solo exhibitions ===
- 2018 Graveyards in Between, blackartprojects, Melbourne
- 2018: First international solo exhibition, at the Fondation Opale in Switzerland,
- 2020: Routes / Roots, Linden New Art, Melbourne
- 2021: Manta, blackartprojects, Melbourne

== Collections ==
Fielding's work is held in major collections, including:

- Art Gallery of South Australia
- Art Gallery of New South Wales
- Artbank
- National Gallery of Australia
- National Gallery of Victoria
- Parliament House, Canberra
