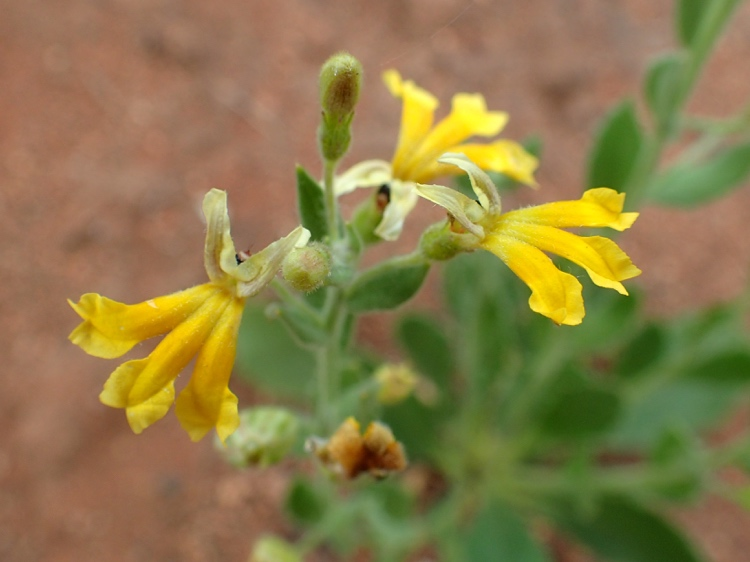
- Goodenia heterochila in Uluṟu-Kata Tjuṯa National Park

Scientific classification
- Kingdom: Plantae
- Clade: Tracheophytes
- Clade: Angiosperms
- Clade: Eudicots
- Clade: Asterids
- Order: Asterales
- Family: Goodeniaceae
- Genus: Goodenia
- Species: G. heterochila

Binomial name
- Goodenia heterochila F.Muell.

= Goodenia heterochila =

Serrated goodenia

Species of plant

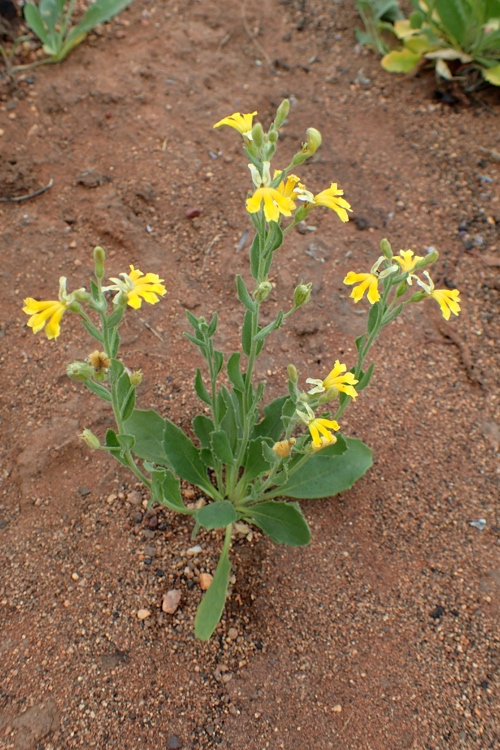
Habit

Goodenia heterochila, commonly known as serrated goodenia, is a species of flowering plant in the family Goodeniaceae and is endemic to arid areas of Australia. It is an erect or ascending perennial herb with lance-shaped to egg-shaped stem leaves with the narrow end towards the base, and racemes of yellow flowers with a brownish centre.

== Description ==
Goodenia heterochila is an erect or ascending perennial herb up to 40 cm (16 in) tall. The leaves are mostly on the stems and are egg-shaped to lance-shaped with the narrower end towards the base, 10–50 mm (0.39–1.97 in) long and 4–14 mm (0.16–0.55 in) wide with teeth on the edges. The flowers are arranged in racemes up to 200 mm (7.9 in) long with leaf-like bracts, the individual flowers on pedicels 5–10 mm (0.20–0.39 in) long. The sepals are linear to lance-shaped, 1.5–2.5 mm (0.059–0.098 in) long, the corolla yellow with a brownish centre, 8–12 mm (0.31–0.47 in) long. The lower lobes of the corolla are 4–5 mm (0.16–0.20 in) long with wings about 1.5 mm (0.059 in) wide. Flowering occurs in most months and the fruit is a more or less spherical capsule about 5 mm (0.20 in) in diameter.

== Taxonomy and naming ==
Goodenia heterochila was first formally described in 1863 by Ferdinand von Mueller in Fragmenta Phytographiae Australiae from specimens collected by Frederick George Waterhouse during the John McDouall Stuart expedition of 1862. The specific epithet (heterochila) mean "unequal-edged", referring to the lower corolla lobes.

== Distribution and habitat ==
This goodenia grows in sandy soil in arid areas of the Northern Territory, South Australia, Queensland and Western Australia.

== Conservation status ==
Goodenia heterochila is classified as "not threatened" by the Government of Western Australia Department of Parks and Wildlife and of "least concern" under the Northern Territory Government Territory Parks and Wildlife Conservation Act 1976 and the Queensland Government Nature Conservation Act 1992.
