= Milatjari Pumani =

Australian painter (1928–2014)

- Born: 1928; Amuroona, South Australia
- Died: 2014 (aged 85–86); Mimili, South Australia
- Occupation: Painter
- Years active: 2008–2014
- Organization: Mimili Maku
- Style: Western Desert art
- Spouse: Sam Pumani (deceased)
- Children: 3 sons, 2 daughters
- Parent(s): Nyapi and Mantjangka Everard

Milatjari Pumani (1928–2014) was an Aboriginal Australian artist from Mimili in South Australia. She is perhaps the most well-known artist from this community, and the first to gain a significant level of success for the community's centre, Mimili Maku. Her eldest daughter, Ngupulya, is also a successful painter.

== Biography ==
Milatjari was born in 1928, in the bush in north-western South Australia. She was born at Amuroona, on a cattle station between what are now the communities of Indulkana and Mimili. When she was a young girl, her family encountered stockmen at a waterhole called Victory Well. The family then moved to settle and work at the station, then called Everard Park. Milatjari's father was Nyapi "King" Everard and her mother was Mantjangka Everard (Everard was the surname given to them). Milatjari met her husband Sam Pumani in Mimili, and they had five children together: Ngupulya, Betty, Ken, Michael and Lewey.

Before artists began to paint at Mimili, Milatjari produced traditional pokerwork designs on wooden blocks. She would teach her methods to younger workers. She did not begin painting until 2008, when she was about 80 years old. She painted for the community's art centre, Mimili Maku. Her works from 2008 were featured in Alice Springs later that year, at the annual "Desert Mob" exhibition. She was featured in the same exhibition again in 2009 and 2010, and on both occasions she was considered the most successful Mimili artist. She had a solo exhibition in 2009, which was held in Adelaide. In 2010 and 2011, she was chosen as a finalist for the National Aboriginal & Torres Strait Islander Art Award. One of her paintings was bought by the Art Gallery of South Australia, and several others are held in the National Gallery of Victoria.

Milatjari Pumani died in Mimili in 2014.

== Artwork ==
Milatjari painted the Maku Tjukurpa, which is the Dreaming (spirituality) associated with the land around Mimili. Antara, close to Mimili, was a place represented in almost all her paintings. It is her uncle's traditional country, and Milatjari's family would often go hunting and gathering food here when she was young. She and her mother and sister would dig for witchetty grubs (maku) while her father and brothers went hunting. Antara and Ngura Walytja (family's country) are common titles for her paintings.

Milatjari used earthy colours on a dark background to depict the landscape of Antara. She painted figures and stories from the Maku Tjukurpa using fields of dots. Her style and technique has influenced those of many of Mimili Maku's younger artists, including her daughter Ngupulya and Tuppy Ngintja Goodwin.
