= Pimelea macrostegia =

Scientific classification
- Kingdom: Plantae
- Clade: Tracheophytes
- Clade: Angiosperms
- Clade: Eudicots
- Clade: Rosids
- Order: Malvales
- Family: Thymelaeaceae
- Genus: Pimelea
- Species: P. macrostegia

Binomial name
- Pimelea macrostegia (Benth.) J.M.Black

Synonyms
- Pimelea ligustrina var. macrostegia Benth.

Species of shrub

Pimelea macrostegia is a species of flowering plant in the family Thymelaeaceae and is endemic to Kangaroo Island in South Australia. It is a shrub with glabrous, narrowly elliptic leaves and clusters of pale yellow flowers surrounded by 4 or 6 egg-shaped, pale green involucral bracts.

== Description ==
Pimelea macrostegia is a shrub that typically grows to a height of 0.7–1.5 m (2 ft 4 in – 4 ft 11 in) and has glabrous stems. Its leaves are narrowly elliptic, 12–33 mm (0.47–1.30 in) long and 3–13 mm (0.12–0.51 in) wide on a short petiole. The flowers are pale yellow and arranged in clusters of 50 to 90 on a peduncle 1.5–9 mm (0.059–0.354 in) long. There are 4 or 6 pale green, sometimes also purplish, egg-shaped or broadly egg-shaped involucral bracts, mostly 13–26 mm (0.51–1.02 in) long and 10–20 mm (0.39–0.79 in) wide around the flower clusters, each flower on a hairy pedicel. The sepals are 3–4 mm (0.12–0.16 in) long, the floral tube 10–17 mm (0.39–0.67 in) long, and the stamens longer than the sepals. Flowering occurs from November to February.

== Taxonomy ==
This pimelea was first formally described in 1873 by George Bentham, who gave it the name Pimelea ligustrina var. macrostegia in Flora Australiensis, based on specimens collected in "sandy scrub" on Kangaroo Island by Frederick George Waterhouse. In 1925, John McConnell Black raised the variety to species status as Pimelea macrostegia in Transactions and Proceedings of the Royal Society of South Australia. The specific epithet (macrostegia) means "large roofed".

== Distribution and habitat ==
Pimelea macrostegia grows in sandy scrub or shrubland on Kangaroo Island in South Australia.
