= Robin Kankapankatja =

Australian painter (c.1930–2013)

- Born: Kunmanara Tjilpi Kankapankatja c. 1930; Walalkara, near Kaltjiti, South Australia
- Died: January 2013
- Occupation: Artist
- Years active: 2004–2013
- Organization: Kaltjiti Arts
- Style: Western Desert art
- Spouse: Tjayangka Antjala Robin

Kunmanara Tjilpi Kankapankatja (c. 1930 – January 2013), Robin Kankapankatja, was an Australian Aboriginal artist. He worked for most of his life as a labourer and conservationist. He is the manager and senior traditional owner of Walalkara, a homeland and Indigenous protected area on the Aṉangu Pitjantjatjara Yankunytjatjara Lands. He began work as an artist in 2004, aged in his 70s. His artworks are now held in several major galleries in Australia.

== Biography ==
Robin Kankapankatja was born at Walalkara, a place in the Great Victoria Desert near Kaltjiti, South Australia. His father was Pitjantjatjara from the land west of Watarru; his mother was Yankunytjatjara from Makiri, northwest of Walalkara. Robin grew up living a traditional, nomadic life in the area around Kaltjiti. The first time he saw a whitefella was when he was a young teenager. As a young man, he worked on the cattle stations at Welbourne Hill and Everard Park.

When he was much older, Robin moved back to Walalkara and set up an outstation for his family on his homelands. He lived there with his wife, Tyayangka, and his children. Kankapankatja was the senior traditional owner (nguraṟitja) of Walalkara. The people that lived on this outstation were all part of his family. They were the land managers of Walalkara Indigenous Protected Area, a federally protected reserve created from an agreement between the Robin family and the Australian government. It covers 700,000 hectares (7,000 km^{2}) of the Great Victoria Desert. Until 2008, Kankapankatja and his wife Tyayangka worked as rangers of the reserve. When they retired, their children took over its management. Robin Kankapankatja died in January 2013.

== Artwork ==
Robin began working as an artist in July 2004, while he was at home recovering from surgery. His paintings and drawings are about Walalkara. They depict the landscape, animals, and spiritual Dreaming stories associated with it. He is also known for carving traditional tools, such as boomerangs, spears, spear-throwers and shields.

From 2006, Robin's work has been shown in many exhibitions alongside other Kaltjiti artists. In 2007, he was featured at the Mossenson Galleries in Collingwood, Victoria. His work was featured as part of the annual Desert Mob exhibition in Alice Springs, in 2006, 2007, 2008 and 2009. It was also exhibited in Adelaide at the Flinders University City Gallery in 2009, and the South Australian Museum in 2010.

In 2012, the Cross Cultural Art Exchange in Darwin held a solo exhibition of Robin's work. The exhibition was called Nyangatja ngayuku aṟa irititja: this is my life from long ago. It showcased a series of drawings that depict Robin's memories from growing up in the bush, and the legendary journeys of his ancestors. In the same year, his work was also shown at the annual Our Mob exhibition in Adelaide, at an exhibition of Kaltjiti Arts in the Darwin Aboriginal Art Fair, and in Germany, in an exhibition at the ArtKelch gallery in Freiburg im Breisgau.

Examples of Robin's work are held in the collections of the Araluen Arts Centre, Flinders University, and the National Gallery of Australia. Others are held in the national Artbank collection, and several private collections, such as the Gallery Gabrielle Pizzi in Melbourne.
