= Tuppy Ngintja Goodwin =

Australian artist

Tuppy Ngintja Goodwin is an Aboriginal Australian artist from South Australia. She is a painter, and director of Mimili Maku Arts.

== Early life ==
Tuppy Ngintja Goodwin is a Pitjantjatjara woman from Mimili in the Anangu Pitjantjatjara Yankunytjatjara Lands in the remote north-west of South Australia. She was born (Note: Her year of birth is variously quoted as 1952 and 1960.) in Bumbali Creek (her father's Country) and she came to Mimili as a baby, when it was still a cattle station called Everard Park.

== Career ==
Goodwin spent much of her life working at the Mimili Anangu School as a pre-school teacher and retired in 2009.

== Art and cultural practice ==
Goodwin is a painter working with Mimili Maku Arts, where she is a director. Through her work and dance, she is committed to fostering traditional law and culture. She has been painting with Mimili Maku Arts since 2010 and, like many others at the centre, paints her Tjukurrpa (Dreaming). Her work has a particular focus on Antara, a sacred rockhole at Bumbali Creek and a site where the women of the area perform inmaku pakani; a dance ceremony, or inma, where the women paint their bodies in red ochre. Goodwin also paints Tjala (Honey Ant) Dreaming

Goodwin's paintings have a distinct style that has resulted in great success, with fluid brushstrokes overlaying solid masses of colour that bring texture to the canvas.

She also sings to pass on her culture, for example the witchetty grub, or maku, songline — the Maku Tjukurpa, an important ancestral story for the residents of Mimili. She says that it is important for all of the Mimili artists to share their stories, "because knowledge is not held by just one person, it is held collectively by the entire community". What has been passed on from previous generations needs to be recorded accurately and passed down through the generations.

== Recognition ==
Goodwin was a finalist in the 2010 Telstra Aboriginal and Torres Strait Art Awards held in Darwin, Northern Territory.

In 2020 her acrylic painting on linen, Antara (2018), was a finalist in the John Leslie Art Prize at Gippsland Art Gallery in Sale, Victoria.

In 2023, Antara (2022), a large painting using synthetic polymer on linen, won the A$50,000 Arthur Guy Memorial Painting Prize at Bendigo Art Gallery.

== Collections ==
Goodwin's work is held in many important collections including: Art Gallery of New South Wales, Museum and Art Gallery of the Northern Territory, National Gallery of Australia, National Gallery of Victoria and the Art Gallery of New South Wales.

== Personal life ==
Goodwin's late husband was Kunmanara ("Mumu Mike") Williams (1952–2019).

A number of her siblings are also artists, including Robin Kankapankatja and Margaret Dodd.
