= Kaylene Whiskey =

Aboriginal Australian artist

- Born: June 26, 1976 (age 50); Indulkana, South Australia, Australia
- Occupation: Artist
- Family: Whiskey Tjukangku (grandfather)

Kaylene Whiskey (born 26 June 1976) is a contemporary Aboriginal Australian artist. Her work is exhibited in many important Australian galleries and she has been a finalist for many art prizes, including the 2020 Archibald Prize, and won the 2018 Sir John Sulman Prize at the Art Gallery of New South Wales. Whiskey is a Pitjantjatjara woman from Indulkana, a remote Aboriginal community in South Australia, and paints with Iwantja Arts.

== Early life ==
Whiskey was born on 26 June 1976 in the small community of Indulkana, a remote Aboriginal community in South Australia in the APY Lands of South Australia.

She is a Pitjantjatjara woman, the granddaughter of Whiskey Tjukangku. Her family was very involved in the arts, and she grew up around the art centre. As she grew older, she said that painting there was "a good way to keep busy and spend time with my family".

== Career ==
Whiskey has developed a unique style which includes linking the traditional culture of her community's Elders with pop culture references in bright colours. Her favourite musicians Dolly Parton, Tina Turner, Michael Jackson and Cher (whom she often listens to as she paints) are often featured in her work. Whiskey says:

I like to listen to rock music and Tina Turner, and I paint with really strong colours, I put in lots of the special details, and everyone likes it. I paint strong stories too, paintings about heaven and Jesus, and sometimes Mintabie and paintings about my country Indulkana. Sometimes my paintings tell hard stories, but my paintings are always colourful and painting them makes me happy.

— Kaylene Whiskey

Whiskey refers to these idols as her kungkas, which means "woman", most often "young woman", in the Yankunytjatjara language. She has said:

'It's one of my dreams for Dolly to come and visit me in Indulkana, I love to listen to her music while I paint: "9 to 5", "Coat of many colours", "Jolene", and my number one, "Islands in the stream" with Kenny Rogers. I often think, "If Dolly came to visit, what would she do? What would she say? And what would she be wearing?".

In 2025 Whiskey published The art of Kaylene Whiskey: do you believe in love?, which was edited by curator Natalie King along with Iwantja Arts. It includes contributions from Taika Waititi, Jazz Money, and Zoé Whitley.

== Recognition and awards ==
- 2018: Sir John Sulman Prize, for her acrylic painting "Kaylene TV", featuring two of her favourite kungkas, Dolly Parton and Cher.
- 2019: Telstra General Painting Award at the Telstra National Aboriginal and Torres Strait Islander Art Awards, for her water-based enamel painting "Seven Sistas", showing her irreverent interpretation of the Seven Sisters Dreaming (Kungkarangkalpa Tjukurpa), where she casts her own heroic women into the roles, including Wonder Woman and Dorothy from The Wizard of Oz
- 2020: Finalist, Archibald Prize, for her self-portrait (which includes Dolly Parton), entitled Dolly visits Indulkana
- 2020: Winner, Digital Art Prize, Heathcote Cultural Precinct, Melville, Western Australia
- 2022: Melbourne Art Foundation commission, Melbourne
- 2022: Sydney Modern Project commission, Sydney
- 2026: Creative Talent Award, at the 2026 National NAIDOC Week Awards

== Exhibitions ==
- 2018: A Lightness of Spirit is the Measure of Happiness, at the Australian Centre for Contemporary Art in Melbourne; featuring 10 specially commissioned works by Aboriginal artists of south-east Australia, including Whiskey, Robert Fielding, Vincent Namatjira, Yhonnie Scarce, Tiger Yaltangki and others.
- 2019: The National 2019: New Australian Art at the Museum of Contemporary Art.
- 2022: Iwantja Rock n Roll at the Fort Gansevoort gallery in New York, along with the work of Vincent Namatjira and Tiger Yaltangki. Included in the exhibition is her work Kungkas in Hollywood (2021), in which the artist is portrayed in a fantastical scene with Beyoncé and Dolly Parton.
- 2022: Whiskey partnered with knitwear bran WAH WAH to produce vibrant knits including 20 motifs from her artworks. These include cockatoos, boomerangs alongside her idols Cher, Dolly Parton and Wonder Woman.
- 2024: Participant in the 2024 Biennale of Sydney at White Bay Power Station, featuring her installation Kaylene TV, a walk-in television set filled with female pop icons, including black Wonder Woman, which appropriates pop culture

== Collections ==
- ACMI Melbourne
- Art Gallery of New South Wales
- Art Gallery of South Australia
- Art Gallery of Western Australia
- Art Gallery of Ballarat
- Artbank
- Australian Institute of Aboriginal and Torres Strait Islander Studies
- Bendigo Art Gallery
- Fondation Opale, Lens, Switzerland
- Geelong Art Gallery
- Heathcote Cultural Precinct, Melville, WA
- Museum of Contemporary Art Australia
- National Gallery of Australia
- National Gallery of Victoria
- North Dakota Museum of Art, North Dakota
- Queensland Art Gallery and Gallery of Modern Art
- Saint Louis Art Museum, Missouri

== See also ==
- Art of Australia
