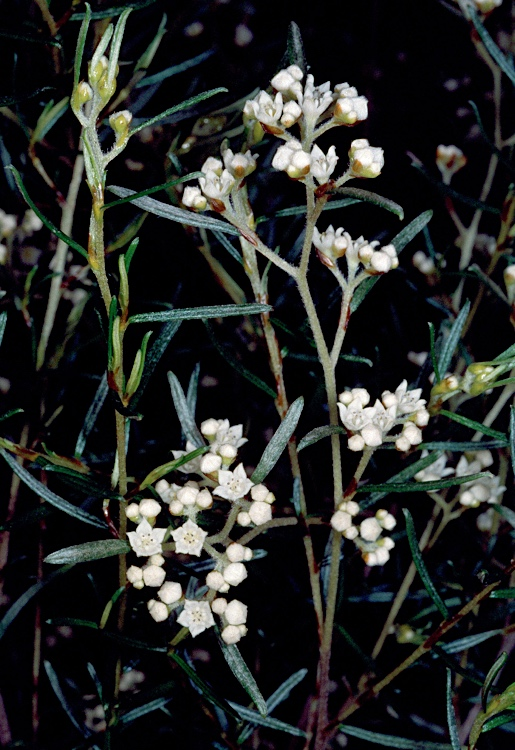
- In the Australian National Botanic Gardens

Scientific classification
- Kingdom: Plantae
- Clade: Tracheophytes
- Clade: Angiosperms
- Clade: Eudicots
- Clade: Rosids
- Order: Rosales
- Family: Rhamnaceae
- Genus: Spyridium
- Species: S. waterhousei

Binomial name
- Spyridium waterhousei F.Muell.

Synonyms
- Cryptandra waterhousei (F.Muell.) F.Muell.; Cryptandra waterhousii F.Muell. orth. var.; Solenandra waterhousei (F.Muell.) Kuntze; Solenandra waterhousii Kuntze orth. var.; Spyridium waterhousii F.Muell. orth. var.; Stenanthemum waterhousei (F.Muell.) Benth.; Stenanthemum waterhousii Benth. orth. var.

= Spyridium waterhousei =

Species of shrub

Spyridium waterhousei is a species of flowering plant in the family Rhamnaceae and is endemic to Kangaroo Island in South Australia. It is an erect, slightly sticky shrub with linear leaves and heads of hairy flowers with three brown bracts at the base.

== Description ==
Spyridium waterhousei is an erect, slightly sticky shrub that typically grows to a height of up to 5 m (16 ft). It has linear leaves 10–15 mm (0.39–0.59 in) long, the edges rolled under and the lower surface silky-hairy. The flowers heads are arranged in cymes usually with up to 3 sessile flowers each with 2 or 3 egg-shaped or lance-shaped brown bracts at the base and felty-hairy floral leaves. The flowers are top-shaped, about 3 mm (0.12 in) long with a prominent, wavy disk above the ovary.

== Taxonomy ==
Spyridium waterhousei was first formally described in 1862 by Ferdinand von Mueller in Fragmenta Phytographiae Australiae, from specimens collected on the "Freestone Range" by Frederick George Waterhouse. The specific epithet (waterhousei) honours the collector of the type specimens.

The species was later included in other genera, including Cryptandra, Solanendra and Stenanthemum, due to confusion surrounding generic limits in the tribe Pomaderreae of the Rhamnaceae.

== Distribution and habitat ==
Spyridium waterhousei is endemic to Kangaroo Island in South Australia where it is known as Cryptandra waterhousii, and grows in sugar gum (Eucalyptus cladocalyx) woodland, often along creeklines.
