= George Murray Black =

Australian graverobber

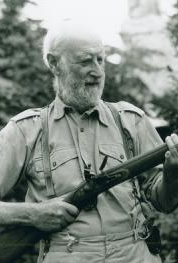
George Murray Black

George Murray Black (28 February 1874 – 2 November 1965) was an Anglo-Australian pastoralist and prolific graverobber of Indigenous Australian burial sites, who ransacked around 1,800 graves along the Murray River and elsewhere.

== Early life ==
Black was born in 1874 at Tarwin Meadows in South Gippsland. His father, George Black, was the main pioneer British colonist of the Tarwin area who established a large pastoral property called Tarwin Meadows. The term Tarwin is derived from the name of the Aboriginal clan who resided in the area before British invasion.

Black's mother was Isabella Watson, daughter of the pioneer British colonist of the Walwa region, Sidney Grandison Watson.

Black was educated at the University of Melbourne where he graduated with a Bachelor of Civil Engineering in 1901. In June 1918, he married Eleanor Jane McMicking.

== Graverobbing and bone collecting ==
=== Early collecting ===
A strong history of collecting the possessions and bones of Indigenous Australians existed in Black's family. When his father, George Black, established Tarwin Meadows in 1851, there were still approximately six members of the Indigenous Tarwin tribe alive. They soon died from frontier violence and introduced diseases, and George Black amassed a large collection of Aboriginal relics and implements which had belonged to them. Those items were later housed at the National Museum of Australia.

Additionally, Black's uncle was Archibald Watson, professor of anatomy at the University of Adelaide. Professor Watson was a former blackbirder who had a strong interest in collecting the human remains of Indigenous Australians for his university.

When Black took control of the Tarwin Meadows property after his father's death in 1902, he ransacked many burial sites of the Tarwin people, stating that he had unearthed at least a dozen Aboriginal skeletons in the district.

=== Collecting for the Australian Institute of Anatomy ===
Black began a professional relationship with the anatomist William Colin Mackenzie and provided Aboriginal skeletal remains for Mackenzie's Australian Institute of Anatomical Research, which had been established at Melbourne in 1919. The human and animal specimens accumulated by Mackenzie grew rapidly and, in 1929, the collection was moved to the Australian Institute of Anatomy in Canberra, where Mackenzie was the director.

By the late 1930s, Black had collected a large quantity of Aboriginal bones from across Victoria and southern New South Wales by ransacking Indigenous burial sites across this area. Those human remains were stored as the "Murray Black Collection" at the Australian Institute of Anatomy.

Black's methods of collection were crude and, when Mackenzie died in 1938, the new director of the institute, Dr Frederick Clements, criticised Black saying that his collecting of bones "lacks adequate method or documentation" and that "it has entirely compromised any potential research possibilities". Indeed, Black himself stated that he simply dug up as many bones as he could and packed them into crates. Any skeletons or bones that he couldn't fit into the crates, he casually dumped into nearby creeks. Clements subsequently ended Black's association with the Australian Institute of Anatomy in 1940.

=== Collecting for the University of Melbourne ===
Soon after, Black established a relationship with the Department of Anatomy at the University of Melbourne. From 1940 to 1950 he systematically and "cheerfully" ransacked most Aboriginal burial sites along a large section of the Murray River valley for the university's collection. The area he pillaged followed along the river from Swan Hill, Victoria west to Renmark, South Australia. As with his activities for the Australian Institute of Anatomy, the collected remains, which included more than 800 full skeletons, were stored at the university under the title of the Murray Black Collection.

Black's haphazard methods of looting the graves resulted in no analysis of the antiquity of the remains nor of the burial sites. Likewise, any human remains deemed unsuitable for the university were again simply dumped.

The main areas Black ransacked for skulls and skeletons were the Chowilla floodplain, Rufus River, Euston, Poon Boon and around the Wakool River.

== Death ==
Black died in 1965. He is buried at Tarwin Lower Cemetery in a grave well-protected by a concrete slab, wrought iron fencing and an elaborate Egyptian-style stone obelisk.

== Repatriation of the Murray Black Collection ==
In 1986, some 1,600 skeletal remains that formed the bulk of the Murray Black Collection were returned for reburial to representatives of various Aboriginal groups from the Murray River region.

== See also ==
- William Ramsay Smith
