= Fort Gansevoort (gallery) =

Art gallery in Manhattan, New York

Coordinates: 40°44′22.5″N 74°0′23.8″W

Fort Gansevoort is an American art gallery that takes its name from the former fort in the New York City borough of Manhattan, called Fort Gansevoort.

While the fort, which was abandoned in the mid-19th century, was located on the Hudson River at the end of Gansevoort Street, the gallery was created by curator Adam Shopkorn in a building at the other end of the street, in a 19th-century house on the corner of Little West 12th Street, in 2015.

The center contains two floors of gallery space as well as dining and retail areas. It holds art exhibitions in the galleries, online exhibitions, and art fairs.

In July 2022, the work of Aboriginal Australian artists Vincent Namatjira, Kaylene Whiskey and Tiger Yaltangki was displayed in an exhibition called Iwantja Rock n Roll (with its name derived from Iwantja Arts, an art centre in the APY lands of South Australia).
