= James George Russell =

Australian lawyer and public servant

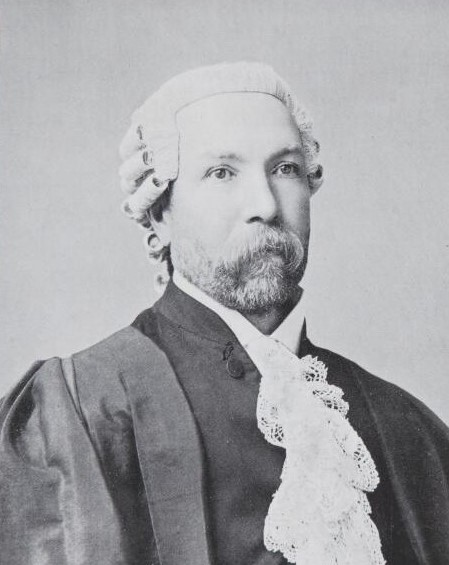

James George Russell ISO (28 March 1848 – 5 January 1918) was an Australian lawyer and public servant, who was an acting Supreme Court judge in South Australia.

Russell was born in Richmond, Surrey, England, the eldest son of James Russell, an undertaker's assistant, and his wife Ann, née Stacey. He migrated to South Australia in 1860.

Russell entered the public service of South Australia in March 1878, becoming Master of the Supreme Court. In August 1889 was appointed Commissioner of Insolvency and stipendiary magistrate at Adelaide in succession to Mr. Stuart. He was also Commissioner of Taxes and Commissioner of Stamps without salary.

Russell sat on several royal commissions, including that into Pastoral Valuations in 1892 and the Land Titles Office in 1908. Russell also led the controversial 1903 inquiry into charges of misuse of human remains by Doctor William Ramsay Smith. Russell was a president of the Public Service Association of South Australia, and in 1903 he was awarded the Imperial Service Order.

On 5 January 1918 Russell died of cancer at his Eastwood, South Australia home; he was survived by his wife, four daughters and three sons. He was buried in North Road cemetery.
