= Yhonnie Scarce =

Australian Kokatha and Nukunu artist

- Born: Woomera, South Australia
- Education: Bachelor of Visual Art (Hons); Master of Fine Arts
- Alma mater: University of South Australia; Monash University
- Known for: Glass art
- Movement: Australian contemporary art

Yhonnie Scarce (Note: Pronounced "you-ah-nee".) is an Australian glass artist whose work is held in major Australian galleries. She is a descendant of the Kokatha and Nukunu people of South Australia, and her art is informed by the effects of colonisation on Indigenous Australia, in particular Aboriginal South Australians. She has been active as an artist since completing her first degree in 2003, and teaches at the Centre of Visual Art in the Victorian College of the Arts in Melbourne.

== Early life and education ==
Yhonnie Scarce was born in Woomera, South Australia, and lived an itinerant early life, living in Adelaide, Hobart, and Alice Springs, before settling in Adelaide from around 1991. She is of the Kothatha people of the Lake Eyre region (north of Woomera) and Nukunu people of the southern Eyre Peninsula

After leaving school, Scarce worked first in administration at the University of Adelaide, then as a trainee at the Tandanya National Aboriginal Cultural Institute in the visual arts department. While doing office work at the Centre for Australian Indigenous Research and Studies at the University of Adelaide in 2001, she enrolled in a Bachelor of Visual Art at the University of South Australia, majoring in glass-blowing with a minor in painting. She graduated in 2003 as the first Aboriginal student to graduate from the University of Adelaide with a major in Glass, and was on the Dean's Merit Award List.

Scarce went on to an honours degree in 2004, during which time she researched the forced removal of Aboriginal people from their country.

She furthered her academic career by participating in a masterclass at North Lands Creative Glass Centre in Lybster, Scotland, in 2005, and received a Women in Research Fellowship from Monash University, undertaking a Masters of Fine Arts in 2008.

== Art practice and works ==
Scarce's art is informed by the effects of colonisation on Indigenous Australia. She is influenced by the qualities of glass as a medium and uses her work to address Aboriginal and Torres Strait Islander issues including genocide, racism, environmental degradation and intergenerational trauma.

Much of Scarce's glass work uses the murnong (yam daisy) as a recurring motif. She has travelled through Germany, Poland, Ukraine, the former Yugoslavian states, Japan and the United States, looking at the design of monuments and memorials, in particular those related to nuclear trauma, genocide, massacres, rebellions and war.

Weak in Colour but Strong in Blood was exhibited at the 19th Biennale of Sydney at the Art Gallery of New South Wales in 2014. It featured glass yams alongside test tubes, arranged in a hospital-like setting.

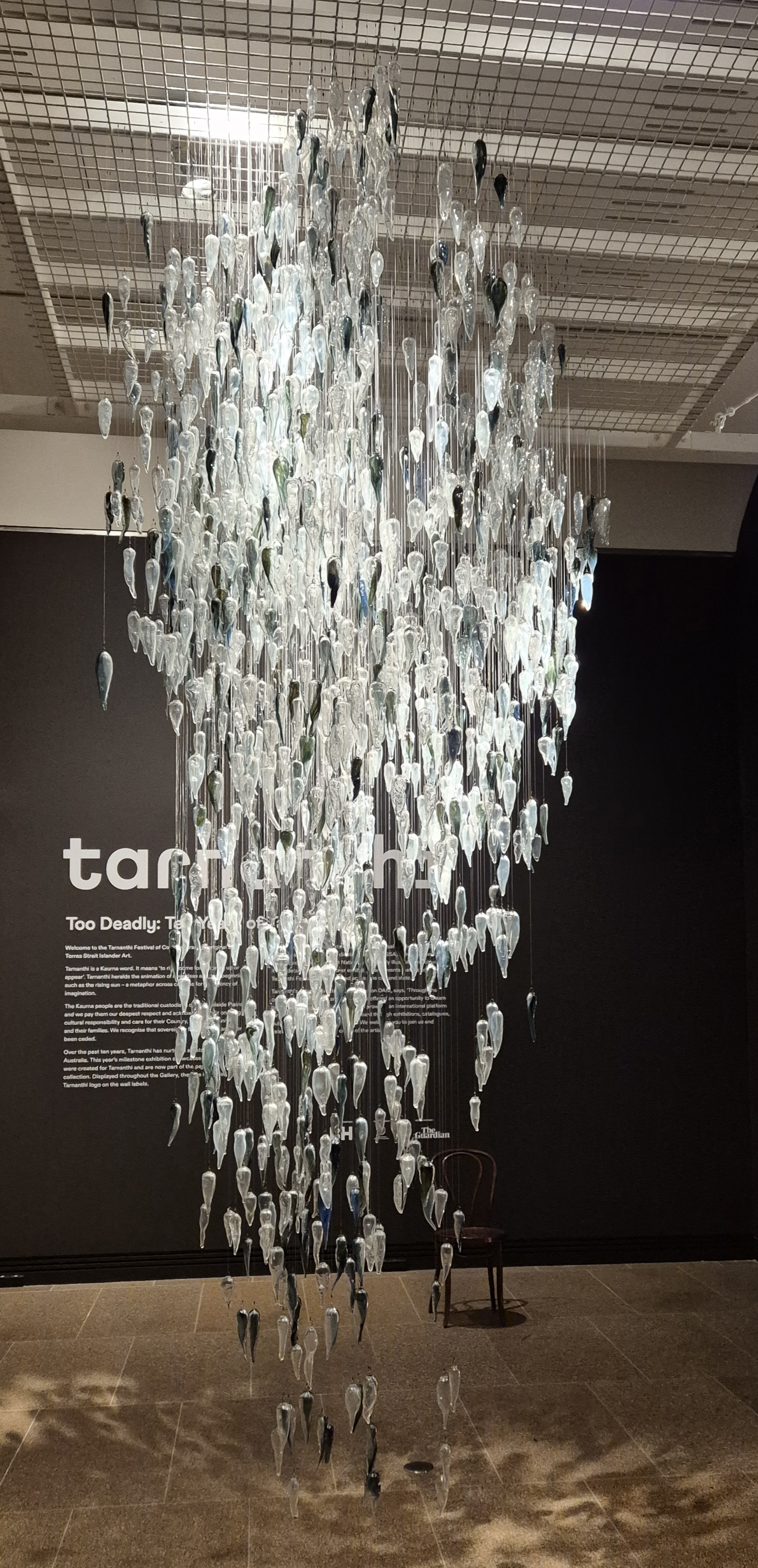
Thunder Raining Poison, 2015 (Tarnanthi, 2025)

The work Thunder Raining Poison (2015), which deals with British and Commonwealth government nuclear testing at Maralinga in South Australia, featured in Defying Empire, the 3rd National Indigenous Art Triennial at the National Gallery of Australia in 2017. Created from more than 2,000 hand-blown glass yams, it references the impact of the nuclear tests on local Aboriginal communities, between 1955 and 1963.

Remember Royalty (2018) features glass yams along with glass bush plums, in cases in front of photographs of the artist's family.

For the 2019 National Gallery of Victoria Architecture Commission, Scarce created In Absence, in conjunction with Edition Office Architectural Studio. Set in the Grollo Equiset Garden at the NGV, this nine-metre high by ten-metre wide cylinder is clad in a dark-stained Tasmanian hardwood, and lined with hundreds of glass yams.

In preparation for her work at the 2020 Adelaide Biennial of Australian Art, In the Dead House, she examined the practices of "body-shoppers", who traded in whole or parts of dead bodies. The installation is mounted in the building formerly used as a morgue by the Adelaide Lunatic Asylum and later the Parkside Lunatic Asylum in the late 19th and early 20th centuries, now in the Adelaide Botanic Garden. Scottish physician William Ramsay Smith, who practised medicine at the Royal Adelaide Hospital in the early 1900s and used to sell body parts to international buyers, obtained some of his material from the morgue. Scarce also found that the practice of trading body parts continues today on the dark web, despite the advances in medical ethics, human rights and cultural heritage law and practices (including around the repatriation of human remains). The theme of the Biennial is monsters, and Smith is the monster represented in Scarce's exhibit.

Before the COVID-19 pandemic, Scarce had been spending some time at the University of Birmingham researching Otto Frisch and Rudolf Peierls, the scientists who worked on developing nuclear bomb technology. She is planning to return to this in order to develop another artwork as a follow-up to Thunder Raining Poison.

In 2020 Scarce created a work called Cloud Chamber, made from 1,000 glass yams hung from the ceiling, one of a series of works exploring the effects of the British nuclear tests at Maralinga on the Maralinga Tjarutja people.

Scarce works at the glass studio at JamFactory.

== Curation ==
In March–April 2021, Scarce and writer Lisa Radford curated an exhibition at the ACE Open gallery in Adelaide as part of the Adelaide Festival, entitled The Image is not Nothing (Concrete Archives). The exhibition features a range of work by international and Australian artists, Indigenous and non-Indigenous, focusing on the implications of British nuclear tests at Maralinga, "as an example of how terra nullius has seeped into this country’s psyche", but with works extending to events outside of Australia, such as Pacific test sites, the atomic bombing of Hiroshima and Ustaše concentration camps in Yugoslavia.

== Academia ==
As of 2020 she is on the staff of the Centre of Visual Art, Victorian College of the Arts.

== Awards and recognition ==
In 2008 Scarce was the inaugural South Australian recipient of the Qantas Foundation Encouragement Award.

== Collections ==
- Art Gallery of New South Wales: Death Zephyr (2017)
- Art Gallery of South Australia: Burial ground (2011); What they wanted (2007)
- Art Gallery of Western Australia; Blood on the wattle (2013); The Near Breeder (2022)
- National Gallery of Australia: Cultivation of Whiteness (2013); Silence part 1, part 2 (2014); Thunder Raining Poison (2015); Glass Bomb (Blue Danube) Series I, II, III (2015)
- National Gallery Victoria:The Collected (2010); Blood on the wattle (Elliston, South Australia 1849) (2013); Oppression, repression (family portrait) (2004)

== Exhibitions ==
- 2004 Scarce's first solo exhibition was held at BANK Gallery at the University of South Australia
- 2007 Artspace, Adelaide Festival Centre
- 2008 Samstag Museum of Art, Adelaide
- 2008 Harrison Galleries, Sydney
- 2008 Linden Centre for Contemporary Art, exhibition curated by Julie Gough
- 2009 Tandanya
- 2016 Harvard Art Museum
- 2016 Galway Art Centre, Ireland
- 2016 dianne tanzer gallery, Melbourne
- 2018: A Lightness of Spirit is the Measure of Happiness, at the Australian Centre for Contemporary Art in Melbourne; featuring 10 specially commissioned works by Aboriginal artists of south-east Australia, including Scarce, Robert Fielding, Vincent Namatjira, Kaylene Whiskey and others.
- 2020: Featured in Adelaide Biennial of Australian Art at the Art Gallery of South Australia, which is titled "Monster Theatres".
- 2020–2021 Looking Glass: Judy Watson and Yhonnie Scarce at the TarraWarra Museum of Art in Victoria. Curated by Hetti Perkins, the exhibition featuring the work of Judy Watson and Scarce was scheduled to be shown at the Ikon Gallery in Birmingham, England, but owing to the COVID-19 pandemic, it was rearranged to stay home.
