= Sinumelon bednalli =

Conservation status
- Vulnerable (IUCN 2.3)

Scientific classification
- Kingdom: Animalia
- Phylum: Mollusca
- Class: Gastropoda
- Order: Stylommatophora
- Family: Camaenidae
- Genus: Sinumelon
- Species: S. bednalli

Binomial name
- Sinumelon bednalli John Henry Ponsonby-Fane, 1904

Species of gastropod

Sinumelon bednalli is a species of air-breathing land snail, a terrestrial pulmonate gastropod mollusk in the family Camaenidae. This species is endemic to Australia.
