= Waterhouse Natural Science Art Prize =

Australian annual competition for artists, with a science theme

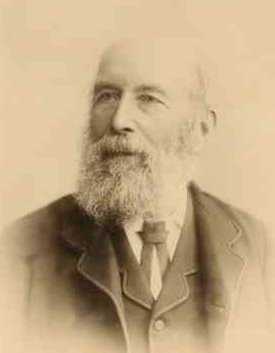
Frederick George Waterhouse

The Waterhouse Natural Science Art Prize, formerly the Waterhouse Natural History Art Prize, is a biennial competition for artists, with a science theme, organised by the South Australian Museum in Adelaide, South Australia.

== History ==
The prize was established in 2002 and named after Frederick George Waterhouse, who was the first curator of the Museum. He discovered 40 new species of fish along the SA coastline, collected plants, insects, reptiles, birds and mammals and was an avid naturalist. The annual competition changed its name to "Waterhouse Natural Science Art Prize" in 2013. It offered a total prize pool of A$77,000 in that year.

The competition was not held in 2015 due to a consultative review on the nature of the competition. However, a retrospective exhibition, Magnified: 12 years of the Waterhouse Natural Science Art Prize, exhibiting all winners thus far, took place at the National Archives of Australia (NAA) in Canberra.

It was held again in 2016, and has been held biennially since then.

== Description ==
As of 2022 there are two categories of prize, which is open to artists of any age, nationality and experience:

- Open Prize, worth $30,000; and
- Emerging Artist Prize, worth A$10,000.

There is an exhibition of the works at the museum, which also tours to the Museum of Australian Democracy in Canberra, hosted by the NAA, and all of the exhibits are available for purchase.

== Winners ==
- 2026: Deb McKay, for The Ghosts of our Coastal Water (ceramic art)
  - 2026 Emerging artist category: Kat Parker, for Discarded (Christmas Island Pipistrelle) (hanging sculpture)
- 2024: Jenna Lee, for Grass Tree – Growing Together (sculpture)
  - 2024 Emerging artist category: Andrew Gall, for Coming Together (3D-printed shell necklace)
- 2022: Kyoko Hashimoto and Guy Keulemans for Bioregional Rings (Central Coast) (sculpture made from natural and found materials)
  - 2022 Emerging artist category: Deb McKay, for Fragile Forms (porcelain sculptures)
- 2020: Grayson Cooke and Emma Walker for Open Air (multimedia work)
  - 2020 Emerging artist category: Rebecca McEwan, for 4000 Stories (sculptural installation)
- 2018: Erica Seccombe, for Metamorphosis (video work)
  - 2018 Emerging artist category: Hayley Lander, for The great forgetting (painting)
- 2016: Julia deVille for Neapolitan Bonbonaparte
- 2014: Carole King for High Tide, Wynnum (painting)
- 2013: Judith Brown for Flight of Fancy (a cape made of leaves and bulb casings)
- 2012: Margaret Loy Pula for Anatye (Bush Potato) (painting)
- 2011: Julie Blyfield for Scintilla Series-Spiralling weed, Soft sponge, Sea urchin (silver objects)
- 2010: Nikki Main for Flood Stones (glass art)
- 2009: Matilda Mitchell for Fish (painting)
- 2008: Michael McWilliams for Bandicoot Playground (painting)
- 2005: Michael McWilliams for The Centre of Attention (painting)
- 2004: Chris Stubbs for Forgive Them Mother (clay sculpture)
- 2003: James King for Winter Foliage #12

== Funding ==
The Waterhouse Natural Science Art Prize receives sponsorship from public and private sectors. The prize is also supported by private donations.

In 2014, Gala launch principal sponsors were Beach Energy and the Government of South Australia. Exhibition prize sponsors were legal firm Fisher Jeffries, printer Finsbury Green and the South Australian Department of Environment, Water and Natural Resources (DEWNR). Private donations in support of the prizes (a total prize pool of A$114,500) in 2014 included:

- The Helen Hill Smith OAM Prize for Sculpture and Objects, presented by Sam and Robert Hill Smith in memory of their mother;
- The Dr Wendy Wickes Memoriam Prize, provided by "her life’s companion"; and
- The Paintings Prize, presented in recognition of the Adelaide pasta company San Remo.

In 2018 the prize had federal government support through the Australia Council for the Arts and the National Archives of Australia; from the Government of South Australia via Arts South Australia; from the City of Adelaide; and from private sponsors the Hill Smith Gallery, Fisher Jeffries, The Adelaide Review, and printers Finsbury Green.
