= Poltpalingada Booboorowie =

Prominent 19th C Aboriginal resident of Adelaide, aka Tommy Walker

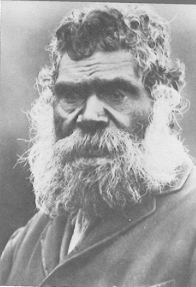
- Walker, c. 1880
- Born: c. 1830; Lake Albert, South Australia
- Died: 4 July 1901 (aged 70–71); Adelaide, South Australia
- Other name: Tommy Walker
- Known for: Prominent Fringe dweller in Adelaide, South Australia during the 1890s

Poltpalingada Booboorowie (c. 1830 – 4 July 1901) was a prominent Aboriginal man of the Thooree clan of the Ngarrindjeri nation, who lived among the community of fringe dwellers in Adelaide, South Australia during the 1890s. He was a well-known and popular figure among Adelaide residents, who knew him as Tommy Walker, and his antics and court appearances were reported upon regularly in the newspapers.

After his death, his remains became the subject of a scandal when it was discovered that the city coroner, William Ramsay Smith, had removed his remains before burial and sent his body to the University of Edinburgh as an anthropological specimen.

== Early life ==
Walker was born in the early 19th century on the shores of Lake Albert in the upper south-east of South Australia. While young, Walker's father was reportedly killed in a tribal fight with the neighboring Kaurna people. He occasionally worked for local settlers, and he may have travelled to the Victorian goldfields in the 1850s.

Walker spent most of his life travelling between the fringe camps inhabited by displaced Aboriginals and, although he spurned white settlements and the restrictions of mission life, frequently visited the Point McLeay Mission (Raukkan) on the banks of Lake Alexandrina. Often arrested for drinking offences he was popular in Point McLeay for his wit. One story that became almost legendary regarded his church attendances. Whenever the communion cup was passed to Walker, he would drain it then call out, Fill 'im up again. From the 1870s he was never seen without his companion Mary.

== Adelaide fame ==
In the late 1880s, Walker and Mary joined the Fringe dwellers that lived in the Adelaide Park Lands. In 1892 Mary died and Ada Niledalli became his companion. Photographs show him as a thick set man with bushy hair, a full white "flour bag" beard and grey felt top hat, wearing a ragged jacket or tail-coat, and barefooted.

A renowned mimic with a "sharp wit and acid tongue" Walker spoke fluent English and was especially fluent in what the media called "condemnatory passages". His popularity with the public was such that the government gave him a pass for free travel on public transport, and the newspapers referred to him as the chartered libertine of the metropolis. He also had the gift of retort and it is related that one day he was travelling in a first class rail carriage when a Government Minister said "Hello Tommy, how do you come here?", Walker immediately replied "All the same as bloody member of Parliament, got a free pass."

The local newspapers regularly reported on his movements, activities and his numerous appearances in court, usually on charges of being drunk, using insulting language or begging. Walker's begging was popular with the public as it resembled street theatre in which he would recount his most recent arrest, parodying the magistrate bringing down his sentence and imposing a fine. As Aboriginals had free access to public gatherings, he frequented football and cricket matches at Adelaide Oval where he would entertain the crowd with dramatic recreations of his police court appearances, alternatively playing the part of both the magistrate and offender. Walker became a common sight in Adelaide, walking the streets with Ada and his dogs while being followed by dozens of children. He once told a reporter; "It's a funny thing that a gentleman can't walk along the footpath without a crowd of kids after him".

Walker's arrests were so frequent (and reported) that a rhyme about him was popular among schoolchildren who generally idolised him:

Tommy Walker, walk up here
You are charged with drinking beer
Forty bob you'll have to pay
Or down below you'll have to stay
Ta-ra-ra-ra-boom-de-ay.

Walker saw the song as a compliment and often sang it himself at public gatherings. The fines he accumulated were always paid by public donations or from the proceeds of his begging.

== Portraits ==
Booboorowie was the subject of several portraits by the Adelaide artist Oscar Friström, one of which was bought by Sir Edwin Smith for the National Gallery of South Australia in 1894.

== Death ==
It was arranged that on 9 July 1901, the Duke of Cornwall (the future king George V) was to visit Adelaide and by official decree, Adelaide's Aboriginals were "deported" to Encounter Bay, 100 km (60 mi) south of Adelaide. Wanting to see the Duke, Walker and several other Aboriginals walked back to Adelaide. Walker was found to be in a "weak and feeble" condition from the effects of the cold weather and was admitted to the Adelaide Hospital but left on 28 June and returned to his wurlie in the parklands. He was later returned to the hospital where he died from hypothermia on 4 July.

The Adelaide Stock Exchange paid for his headstone, and Walker was buried in the West Terrace Cemetery.

=== Stolen remains ===
In 1903 it was discovered that the coroner, Dr. William Ramsay Smith, had removed his skeleton before burial and sent it to the University of Edinburgh as an "anthropological specimen", making up the missing weight in the coffin with sand. The revelation led to public outrage, and Aboriginal people began refusing to attend the Adelaide Hospital when sick. Smith was suspended and charges were laid against him for "the misuse of human remains". A board of inquiry found that the coroner's actions had been "indiscreet", and he was dismissed from his position as coroner. However, Smith was later reinstated and continued his practice of collecting remains.

The Aborigines Friends Association wrote to the government on behalf of the mission residents after the discovery, asking to arrange for his remains to be returned, but their request was not taken seriously.

In the early 1990s, the University of Edinburgh became the first British institution to repatriate Aboriginal remains, and Walker's bones were ceremoniously buried at Raukkan.
