= Everard Ranges =

Mountain range in South Australia

Coordinates: 27°06′36″S 132°32′56″E

Location in South Australia

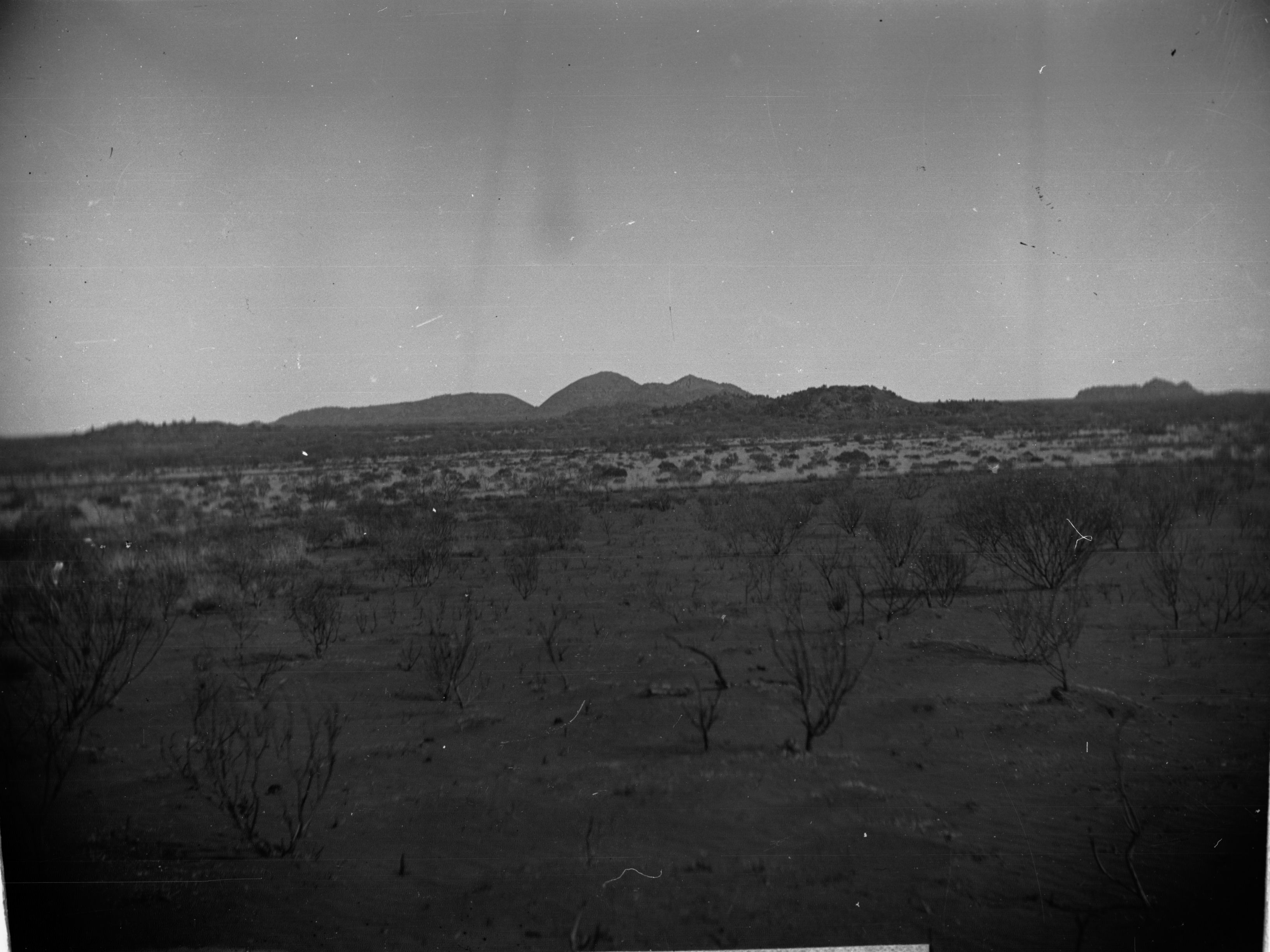
Central Group of Everard Ranges by Mount Illbillee Elder Expedition in 1891

The Everard Ranges, officially known as The Everard Ranges, is a range of low rounded granite hills in the Australian state of South Australia in the Aṉangu Pitjantjatjara Yankunytjatjara lands about 80 kilometres (50 mi) west of Mintabie. It is of Palaeocene origin between 20 and 60 million years ago, in Central Australia . Rising into domes above a Cenozoic peneplain, which is here about 550 metres (1,800 ft) above sea level, they were named by Ernest Giles in 1873 after SA Commissioner of Crown Lands William Everard, and consist of monoliths or bornhardts, rich in caves and overhangs with Aboriginal rock painting galleries. The ranges are similar to Uluru and Kata Tjuta.

Giles described them in his book, Australia Twice Traversed as follows:

"Arriving at the first hills of the Everard, I found they were all very peculiar, bare, red, granite mounds, being the most extraordinary ranges one could possibly imagine, if indeed any one could imagine such a scene. They have thousands of acres of bare rock, piled up into mountainous shapes and lay in isolated masses, forming something like a broken circle, all round a central and higher mass. They have valleys filled with scrubs between each section. Numerous rocky glens and gorges were seen, having various kinds of shrubs and low trees growing in the interstices of the rocks. Every thing and every place was parched, bare, and dry. We searched in many places for water without success."

Tourism in the area has been taken under the wing of the Mimili community, lying about 22 km north-east.

There is an extensive radiation of camaenid land snails in the region, with many species appearing endemic to the Everard Ranges, including Pleuroxia everardensis, P. carmeena, Sinumelon pumilio, Tatemelon everardensis, Semotrachia minuta, S. illbilleeana, Dirutrachia ponderi.
