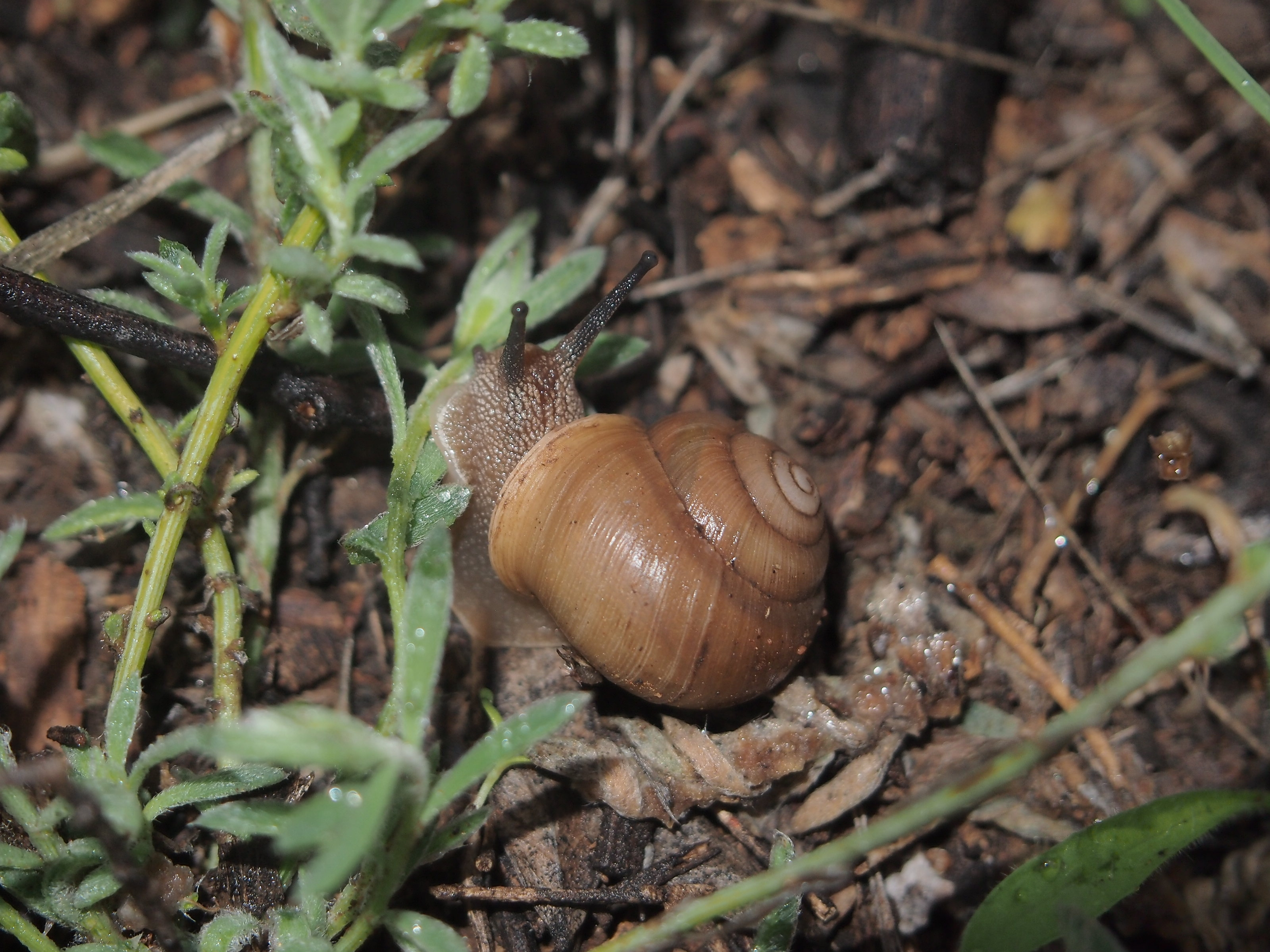

Scientific classification
- Kingdom: Animalia
- Phylum: Mollusca
- Class: Gastropoda
- Order: Stylommatophora
- Family: Camaenidae
- Genus: Sinumelon; Iredale, 1930

= Sinumelon =

Genus of gastropods

Sinumelon is a genus of air-breathing land snails, terrestrial pulmonate gastropod mollusks in the family Camaenidae. Sinumelon is the type genus of the subfamily Sinumeloninae.

== Species ==
Species within the genus Sinumelon include:

- Sinumelon bednalli
