= William Ramsay Smith =

Scottish physician, educator, naturalist, anthropologist and civil servant

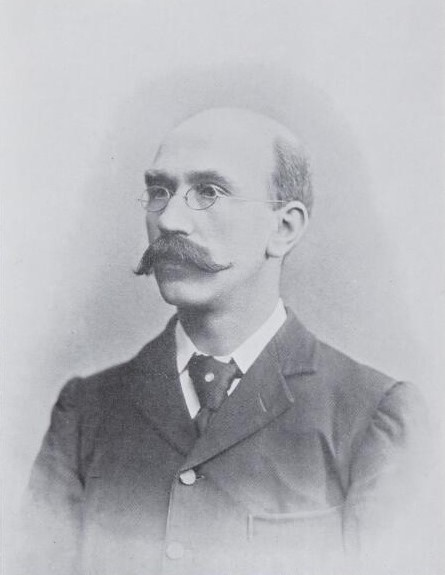
- Smith, c. 1901
- Born: 27 November 1859; King Edward, Aberdeenshire, Scotland
- Died: 28 September 1937 (aged 77); Belair, South Australia
- Other name: Ramsay Smith
- Education: University of Edinburgh (BSc, MB ChM, MD); University of Adelaide (DSc)
- Occupations: Physician; Coroner; Anthropologist; Civil servant
- Known for: Coronial career marked by allegations of misuse of human remains; collection of Aboriginal Australian ancestral remains sent to Edinburgh University
- Spouse: Margaret MacKenzie (m. 1889)
- Children: 5 (four daughters and a son)
- Honours: FRSE (1906)

William Ramsay Smith FRSE (27 November 1859 – 28 September 1937), frequently referred to as Ramsay Smith, was a Scottish physician, educator, naturalist, anthropologist and civil servant, who worked in South Australia after moving there at the age of about 37 in 1896. He was initially appointed as a pathologist at the Royal Adelaide Hospital and was later appointed to other roles, including that of city coroner in Adelaide, but his legacy has been marred by allegations of misuse of human remains. He made a study of Aboriginal Australians, and sent body parts to Edinburgh University's anthropological collection. He published a number of books and articles in scientific journals, and in 1930 published a work under his own name which was later found to be the work of Ngarrindjeri Elder David Unaipon.

== Early life ==
Smith was born to William Smith, a farm servant who went on to become a stationmaster, and his wife Mary née MacDonald who worked in domestic service in King Edward, Aberdeenshire, Scotland. They lived on the estate of Cairnbanno House near New Deer, and it was at the nearby Cairnbanno Public School - run on the Madras School system, under which senior pupils helped teach the juniors - that Smith received his first schooling, later becoming a pupil-teacher there himself. A Free Church scholarship took him to Edinburgh University afrom 1877 to study arts, after which he spent two years training as teacher at Moray House Training College

== Career ==
At 20 years of age Smith was appointed headmaster of Invergordon Public School, in Easter Ross, but, a growing fascination in physiology, he returned to Edinburgh University to study arts and science and away from school teaching all together. He took up a three-year entrance scholarship in medicine worth £100 a year. by 1885 was juggling his medical training with a university post as assistant-professor of natural history and demonstrator of zoology. On completing his medical course in 1885 Smith was appointed assistant-professor of natural history, senior demonstrator of zoology at Edinburgh University. He graduated BSc (natural sciences) in 1888.

In 1889 llustrations of Zoology: Invertebrates and Vertebrates was published, prepared in collaboration with J. Stewart Norwell. He graduated MB ChM in 1892. For two years Smith was demonstrator of anatomy at Edinburgh, and served as examiner at the Royal College of Physicians of Edinburgh. During this period he lived at 4 Grange Loan in the south of Edinburgh. His wedding to Margaret MacKenzie took place on 1 June 1889 in Aberdeen. She was a headmistress and linguist in her own right, and the daughter of James MacKenzie. He went on to enter private practice at Rhyl, Wales.

== Move to South Australia ==
In May 1896, against cautions published by the British Medical Association, Smith accepted the appointment as physician to the (Royal) Adelaide Hospital, in South Australia. The hospital's honorary medical staff had earlier resigned in a dispute with Charles Kingston's government over the dismissal of a nurse, Margaret Graham. In accepting the position, the South Australian branch of the British Medical Association resolved that it viewed the conduct of Smith and also a colleague, Dr Napier, as "highly dishonourable and unprofessional". The two men were ostracised on their arrival in Adelaide, and in 1897 both were formally expelled from the association the following year. Neither was ever readmitted.

Worse followed within weeks, when the hospital's four resident medical officers accused Smith and Napier of incompetence. The accusation collapsed under an open inquiry, first by the hospital board and then by a committee of the Legislative Council, which cleared both men, dismissed one of their accusers, and allowed the rest to resign. The British Medical Association's antipathy towards Smith intensified after he discovered an outbreak of bubonic plague in Adelaide in 1900.

== Coroner and public servant ==
By 1899 Smith's responsibilities had expanded considerably. Alongside his hospital work in infectious diseases, he had become Adelaide's city coroner, inspector of anatomy, and chairman of the Central Board of Health. Two years later, during the South African War, he served as surgeon captain with the Imperial Bushmen's Corps and oversaw plague administration at Cape Town.

The gravest crisis of his career broke in August 1903. He was suspended from his coronial duties on 18 counts under the Anatomy Act, arising from the removal of heads and the collection of skeletons for medical research. Among them the remains of a well-known and popular local Adelaide identity, Tommy Walker, a Ngarrindjeri man. The coroner had stolen Walker's body, dissected it and sent it in parts to Edinburgh University. After a tip off, the graves of Walker and other were exhumed and the coffins found to contain nothing but sandbags. A board of inquiry under James George Russell, with Sir Josiah Symon acting for Smith's defence, concluded only that his conduct had been "indiscreet". He lost his coronial post as a result but despite the public outrage, he did not stay out of office for long. Smith was soon reinstated as coroner and as head of the health department, with his scientific work praised rather than condemned. The affair did however, cost him his hospital appointments, which he gave up to avoid any further conflict of interest.

Smith took a doctorate of science from the University of Adelaide in 1904, the same year he brought out A Manual for Coroners. Aboriginal Australians had by now become a serious private interest for Smith, and it was in this period that he wrote "The Aborigines of Australia" for the Official Year Book of the Commonwealth of Australia. The piece took contemporary misrepresentations of Aboriginal people to task, calling for a fresh look at "our knowledge of [their] beliefs and actions", and describing Aboriginal Australians as the "most interesting [race] at present on earth and the least deserving to be exterminated by us and the most wronged at our hands".

Smith's election as a Fellow of the Royal Society of Edinburgh followed in 1906, proposed by Sir William Turner, Daniel John Cunningham, Alexander Crum Brown and Cargill Gilston Knott, and he later served two terms as president of the anthropology section of the Australasian Association for the Advancement of Science.

His 1913 book Medical Jurisprudence from the Judicial Standpoint earned him a Doctor of Medicine from Edinburgh University.

== First World War ==
Egypt brought Smith into open conflict with authority once again. In 1915 was in charge of the Australian General Hospital, Australian Imperial Force, Heliopolis, Egypt. He found himself at odds with the hospital's principal matron, Jane Bell. Each believed the nursing staff should answer to them rather than the other. An inquiry into the hospital's administration resulted in both being recalled to Australia. A further British War Office inquiry cleared them both of blame other than an inability to adapt.

== Anthropological work ==
Back in Adelaide, Smith resumed his health board work while pursuing what had become a long-standing personal project or studying Aboriginal custom and psychology as a member of the Royal Anthropological Society of Great Britain and Ireland. Working alongside Sir Baldwin Spencer, he wrote much of the Aborigines material for the 1925–26 Australian Encyclopaedia. A set of his glass negatives, taken at the mouth of the Murray River, survives today in the Mortlock Library of South Australia as, reportedly, the only surviving photographic record of that particular group. In Southern Seas (1924), written after a voyage through the South Seas, devoted roughly half its length to Aboriginal subject matter.

Retirement came in 1929. Convinced that traditional Aboriginal culture was disappearing, Smith spent his final working years assembling Myths & Legends of the Australian Aboriginals (1930) from stories told to him by his assistant, David Unaipon, though it later emerged that Unaipon had in fact sold Smith the material outright to finance his own work. Reviewers at the time already found the resulting book too coloured by "white thinking", and its reliability has since been further questioned. The material has since been properly credited to Unaipon and reissued under his name as Legendary Tales of the Australian Aborigines. Separately, Smith has also been accused of selling Aboriginal artefacts for personal profit.

=== Anthropological collection ===
Smith was responsible for the bulk of Edinburgh University's physical anthropology collection, some 500 to 600 individuals.

From Smith's writings, it is clear that he was aware of Indigenous funerary customs:

"After death no reference is made to the deceased, nor is his name mentioned. Relations by the same name find a substitute. A mother would not give [me] a lock of her child's hair because she has been taught that if the child dies, its spirit will find no rest if that lock of hair survives."

As desecration of human remains was illegal, he used his position as Adelaide's coroner to illicitly dissect and collect human remains. Many individuals were of unusual pathologies or disease, most of which he presented to Edinburgh University. His writings indicate that he also robbed graves, and it is believed he had once destroyed five graves to obtain one good specimen. Witnesses are also recorded as saying he practised marksmanship with a .303 rifle on corpses at the mortuary of Adelaide Hospital. While he did not receive direct payment for the remains he supplied, his donations coincided with his election as a Fellow of the Royal Society of Edinburgh (above) and with an honorary fellowship of the Royal Anthropological Institute. He was also an honorary member of the Association of Military Surgeons of the United States.

He was responsible for the collection of human remains of Indigenous Australians, including remains stolen from burial grounds at Hindmarsh Island, some of which were shipped to overseas institutions. At his death, some 180 to 182 skulls were found in his Adelaide home.

In addition to numerous books, Smith also published pamphlets and contributed largely to scientific journals and Chambers Encyclopaedia. He was interested in literature, philosophy and music, kept an interest in cycling and photography and earned a reputation as an authority on Aboriginal Australians.

== Death ==
Smith spent his final years quietly among his books at Belair, South Australia, where he died on 28 September 1937 and was cremated. Smith had married Margaret, daughter of James Mackenzie, on 1 June 1889, who predeceased him. A son and four daughters survived him.

== Legacy ==
He is remembered mainly for his desecration of human remains, a legacy which is grimly symbolised in artist Yhonnie Scarce's work In the Dead House, a glass art installation for the 2020 Adelaide Biennial of Australian Art housed in the building which was used as the morgue of the old Adelaide Lunatic Asylum.

== See also ==
- George Murray Black

== Sources ==
- Serle, Percival (1949). "Smith, William Ramsay". Dictionary of Australian Biography. Sydney: Angus & Robertson.
