= Betty Kuntiwa Pumani =

Aboriginal Australian artist

- Born: 1963 (age 62–63); Near Perentie Bore, South Australia
- Awards: NATSIAA; 2015 Antara (Maku Dreaming); 2016 Antara; 2017 Ngangkari Ngura (Healing Country); Wynne Prize; 2017 Antara

Betty Kuntiwa Pumani is an Aboriginal Australian artist from Anangu Pitjantjatjara Yankunytjatjara in South Australia. Her paintings have won several awards, including the National Aboriginal & Torres Strait Islander Art Award and the 2017 Wynne Prize for landscape art.

Pumani is one of the traditional owners of the Indigenous Protected Area of Antara, which is located south of the Everard Ranges. She is one of several Antara artists who live and show their work in Mimili, South Australia, including her mother Kunmanara (Milatjari) Pumani and her daughter Josina Nyarpingku Pumani.

== Biography ==
Pumani was born in 1963 near Perentie Bore, South Australia, about 30 km from Mimili Community. At Mimili she worked at the store, then at the clinic as a traditional healer. She later became a teacher at the local school.

In 2007 she began painting at the Mimili Maku Art Centre.

== Works ==
Pumani paints Antara, her mother's country. The paintings map its significance and tell its stories. Using a restricted palette she represents the strength of Anangu connection to country. She is being increasingly recognised for her use of vibrant reds and contrasting whites and her large scale compositions.

== Awards ==
In 2016, Pumani won the National Aboriginal & Torres Strait Islander Art Award (NATSIAA) $5,000 general painting prize with a depiction of Antara.

In 2017, a different painting of Antara won the $50,000 Wynne Prize for landscape art. This win prompted criticism from John Olsen, a former winner of the Wynne prize and former judge for the related Archibald Prize in portraiture, who objected to the quality of that year's winners and questioned whether Pumani's Antara qualified as a landscape painting. Olsen's comments "caused a storm of justified outrage", and art critic Susan McCulloch responded to by publishing a brief history of Antara and Aboriginal Dreaming.

In 2019, Pumani's Antara won the Len Fox Painting Award, from Castlemaine Art Museum.

In 2020, a diptych by Pumani and her daughter Marina Pumani Brown was a NATSIAA finalist.
