= Frederick George Waterhouse =

English naturalist, zoologist and entomologist

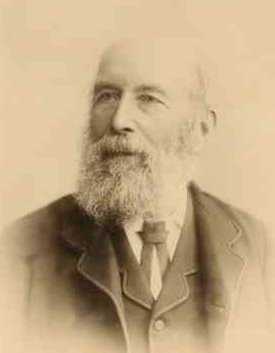
F.G. Waterhouse c. 1890

Frederick George Waterhouse (25 August 1815 – 7 September 1898) was an English naturalist, zoologist and entomologist who made significant contributions to the study of the natural history of Australia.

Waterhouse was born near London, a son of solicitor J. W. Waterhouse. He was a keen naturalist and worked with his elder brother George Robert Waterhouse at the British Museum (Natural History). On 7 July 1852 he married Fanny Shepherd Abbott (c. 1831 – 7 August 1875), and soon after they sailed for South Australia in the Sydney, the first steamer to make the voyage. Together they had five sons and one daughter.

His original intention was to prospect for gold at the Victorian diggings, but he was unsuccessful and found employment with C. T. Hargrave, surveying in the Mount Lofty Ranges and Kangaroo Island.

In 1860 he became curator of the South Australian Institute Museum, which opened in 1862, and which he had helped to found in 1856 with the donation of his own valuable entomological and ornithological collection. He was a corresponding member of the Zoological Society of London.

He joined the John McDouall Stuart Expedition 1861–1862, returning to Adelaide in 1863 with bird and mammal skins, insects and plants, including specimens of the Princess Alexandra parrot, Polytelis alexandrae.

In 1872, trawling in the Gulf St Vincent with Albert Molineux, secretary of the Agricultural Bureau, he caught forty species of fish which had not been found there previously, some of which were new to science, and were described by François Louis de la Porte, comte de Castelnau, working in Melbourne.

In 1882 he took eight months' leave of absence on account of ill-health, travelled to England, and on his return retired to his home "Wandeen" in Burnside. His replacement at the Museum, William Haacke, made his name there by proving that echidnas were oviparous, but resigned after a series of disputes with the Board and Director. In 1897 he moved to Jamestown to live with his son, Edward George Waterhouse (c. 1860 – 25 January 1947). He died on 7 September 1898, aged 83 years, at Mannahill (between Peterborough and Broken Hill), where Edward, a mounted constable, had been transferred. Another son lived at Mannahill and his fourth son, Stuart Abbott Waterhouse (died 24 July 1907), at the nearby Wadnaminga goldfields, where he was a prospector.

He is buried at St Georges Cemetery, Magill, South Australia, as are several other members of his family.

The Waterhouse Natural History Art Prize is named after him.

In 1862, Ferdinand von Mueller name Spyridium waterhousei in his honour. Waterhouse collected the type specimens on Kangaroo Island in South Australia.

Dr Andrew Thomas, Australia's only astronaut and cosmonaut, is a great, great grandson.
