= South Australian Museum =

Natural history museum in Adelaide, South Australia

Coordinates: 34°55′15″S 138°36′11″E

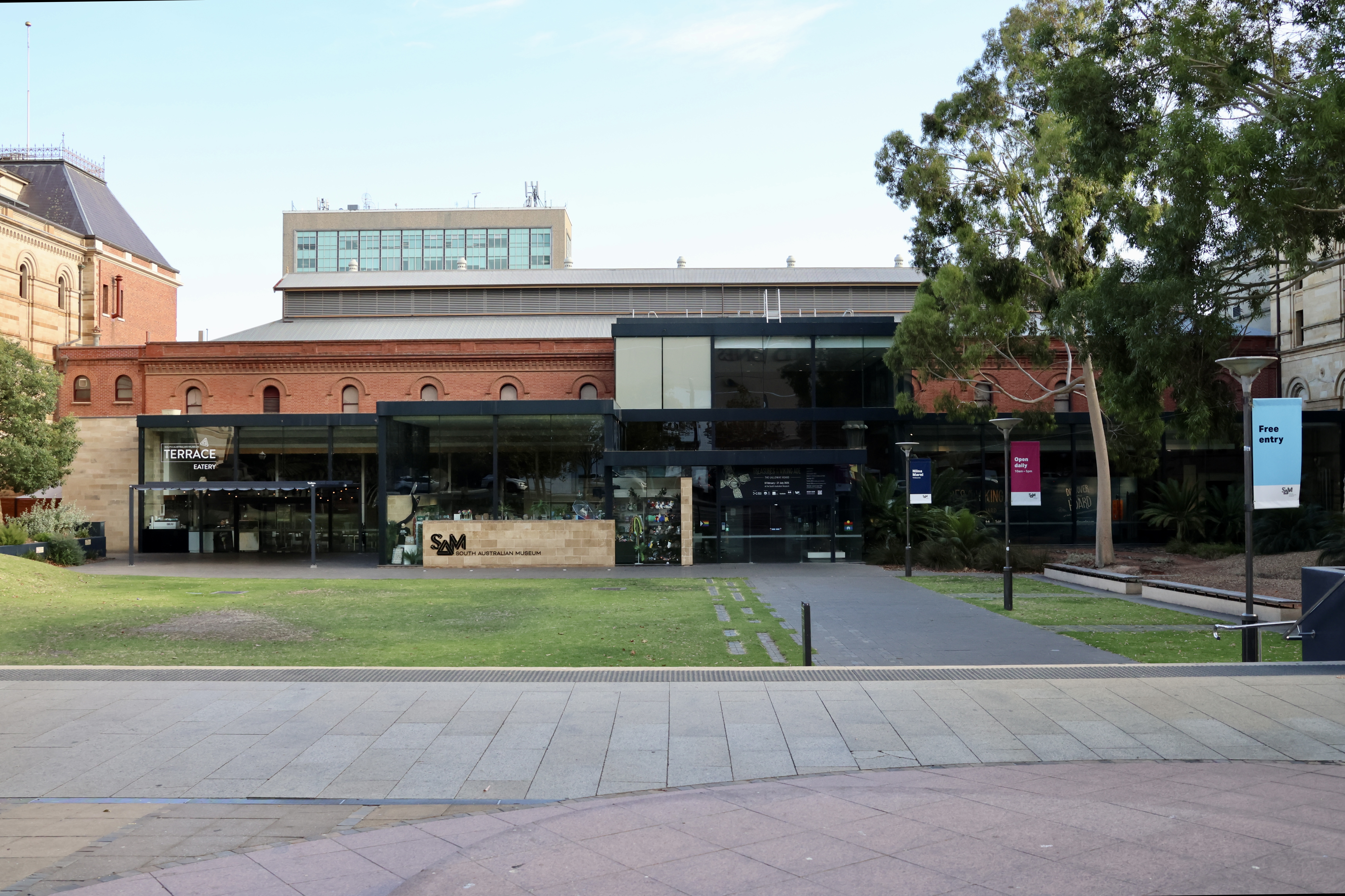
- The South Australian Museum, viewed from Adelaide's cultural boulevard, North Terrace
- Former name: South Australian Institute
- Established: 1856
- Location: Adelaide, South Australia
- Type: Natural history
- Collection size: 4.84 million objects (2020)
- Visitors: 1.1 million
- Directors: Clare Mockler (acting, 2025)
- Owner: Government of South Australia
- Employees: <90 fte, >200 volunteers, students, and honoraries (2021)
- Website: www.samuseum.sa.gov.au

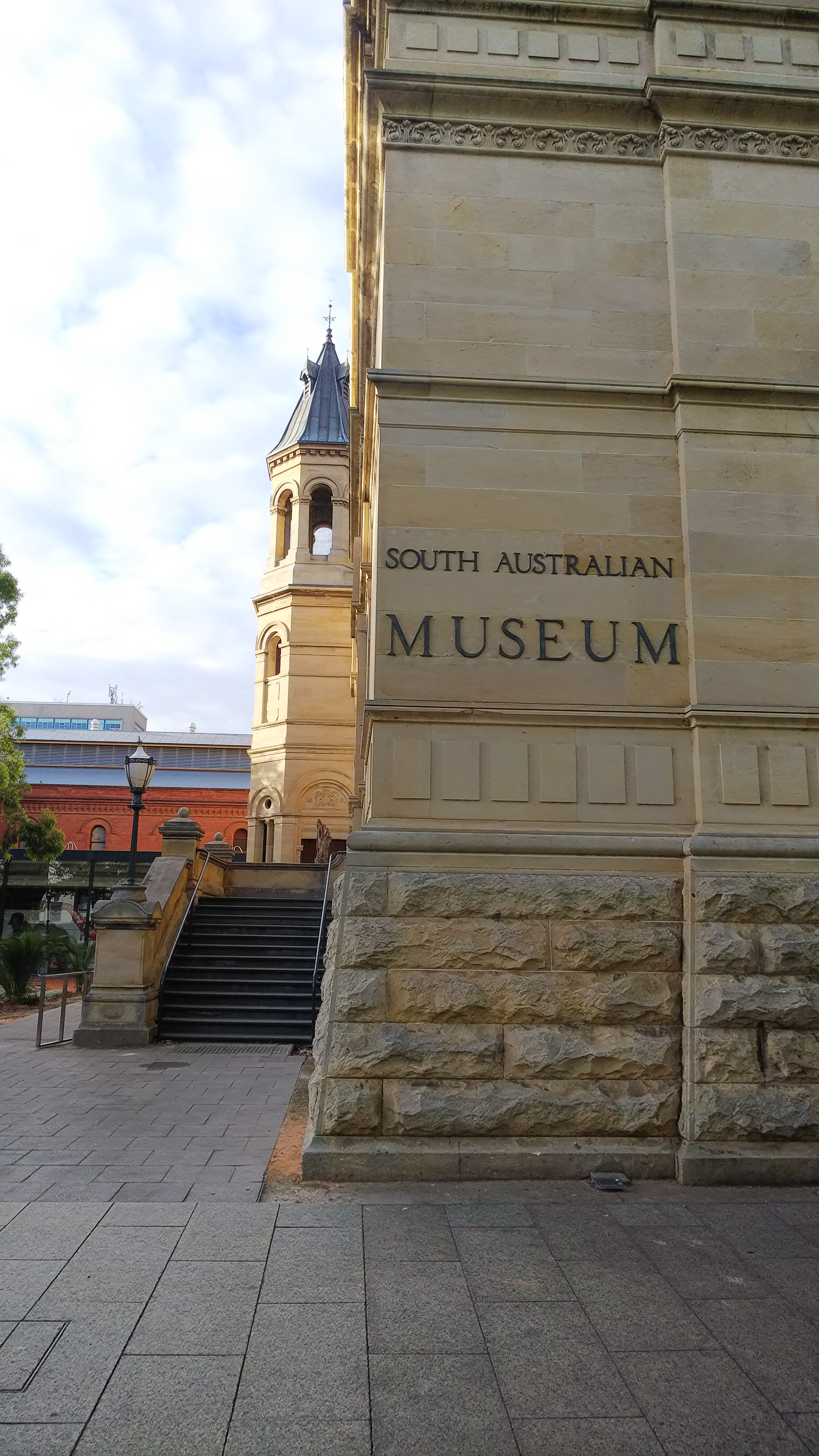
South Australian Museum

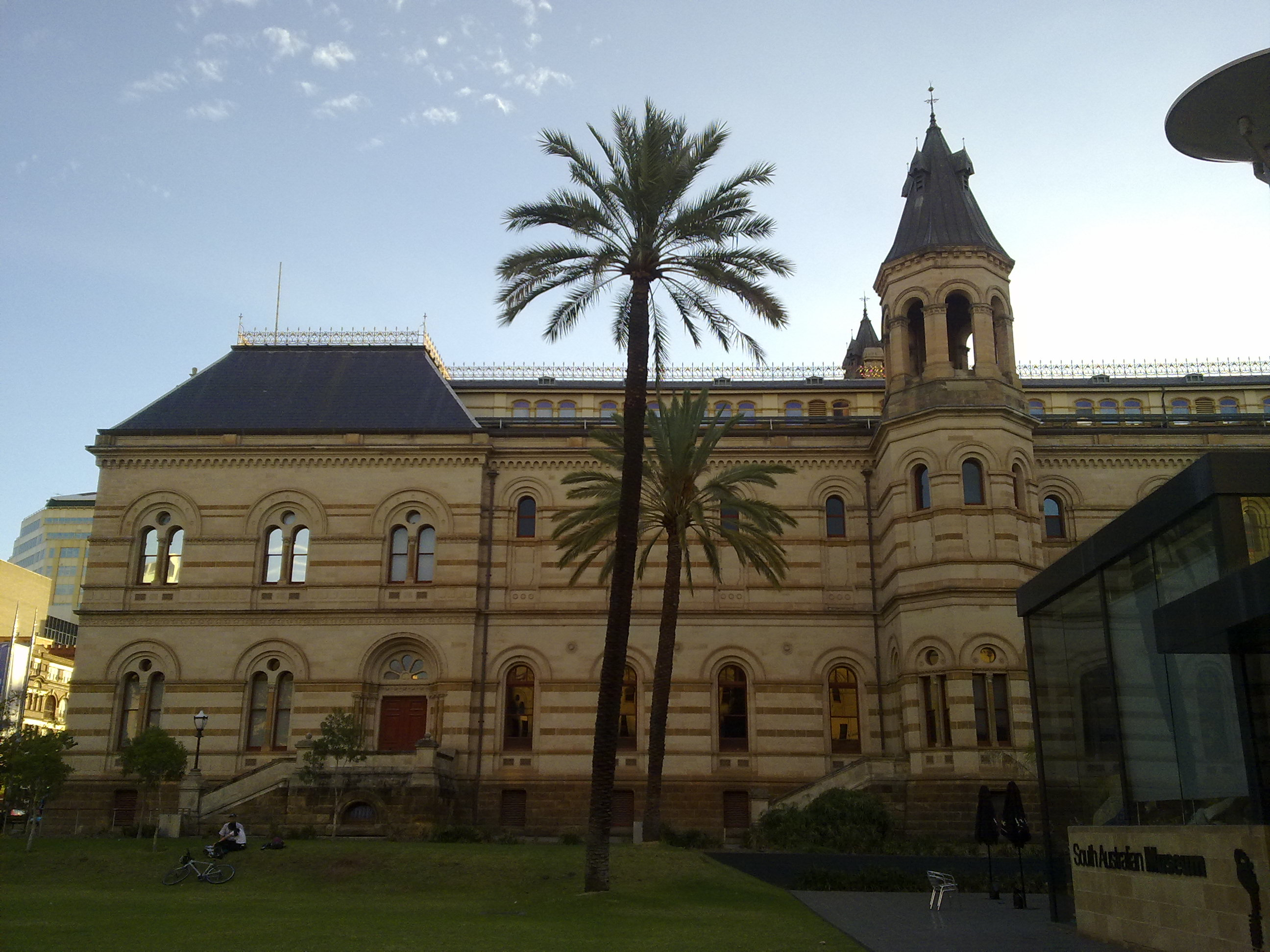
The Mortlock Library, part of the State Library of South Australia, forms the west side of the courtyard at the front of the South Australian Museum

The South Australian Museum is a natural history museum and research institution in Adelaide, South Australia, founded in 1856 and owned by the Government of South Australia. It occupies a complex of buildings on North Terrace in the cultural precinct of the Adelaide Parklands. It has the largest Australian Aboriginal cultural collection in the world, and its Australian Polar collection (formerly the Mawson Gallery) includes many artefacts from early Antarctic exploration by South Australian scientists and explorers. It also holds a large collection of minerals; over three million animal specimens (including the most comprehensive marine mammal collection in Australia); and around 50,000 fossil specimens. The Museum Library includes reference works relevant to the museum research, as well as being a source of specialised publications and photographs for other researchers.

As of September 2025 the acting director of the museum is Clare Mockler; the new director, Samantha Hamilton, begins her role on 20 October 2025.

== History ==
=== 19th century ===
There had been earlier attempts at setting up mechanics' institutes in the colony, but they struggled to find buildings which could hold their library collections and provide spaces for lectures and entertainments. In 1856, the colonial government promised support for all institutes, in the form of provision the first government-funded purpose-built cultural institution building. The South Australian Institute, incorporating a public library and a museum, was established in 1861 in the rented premises of the Library and Mechanics' Institute in King William Street while awaiting construction of the Institute building on the corner of North Terrace and Kintore Avenue.

In June 1856 the South Australian Legislative Council passed Act No. 16 of 1855–6, the South Australian Institute Act (An Act to establish and incorporate an Institution to be called the South Australian Institute), which incorporated the South Australian Institute under the control of a Board of Governors, to whose ownership all materials belonging to the old Library and Mechanics' Institute was immediately transferred. The Act provided for a library and a museum as part of the new organisation.

Frederick George Waterhouse offered his services as curator of the South Australian Institute Museum in June 1859 in an honorary capacity. When the Institute building was completed, the Board appointed him as the first curator, a position he held until his retirement in February 1882. He was succeeded by Wilhelm Haacke, who in January 1883 recommended the South Australian Institute Museum be renamed the South Australian Museum (which did not happen then), and the position of Curator be changed to Director. Haacke was appointed the first Director, but only held the position until he resigned in October 1884 after a series of disputes with the Museum's management

=== 20th century ===
The Museum Act (1939) gave the South Australian Museum autonomy from the Art Gallery and Library, and the South Australian Institute Museum was officially renamed the South Australian Museum. This legislation was superseded by the South Australian Museum Act (1976). At some point between 1996 and 2002, the Museum became part of Arts SA.

In 1997, championed by state Arts Minister Diana Laidlaw, the SA Museum was funded to develop its ground floor Australian Aboriginal Cultures Gallery.

=== 21st century ===
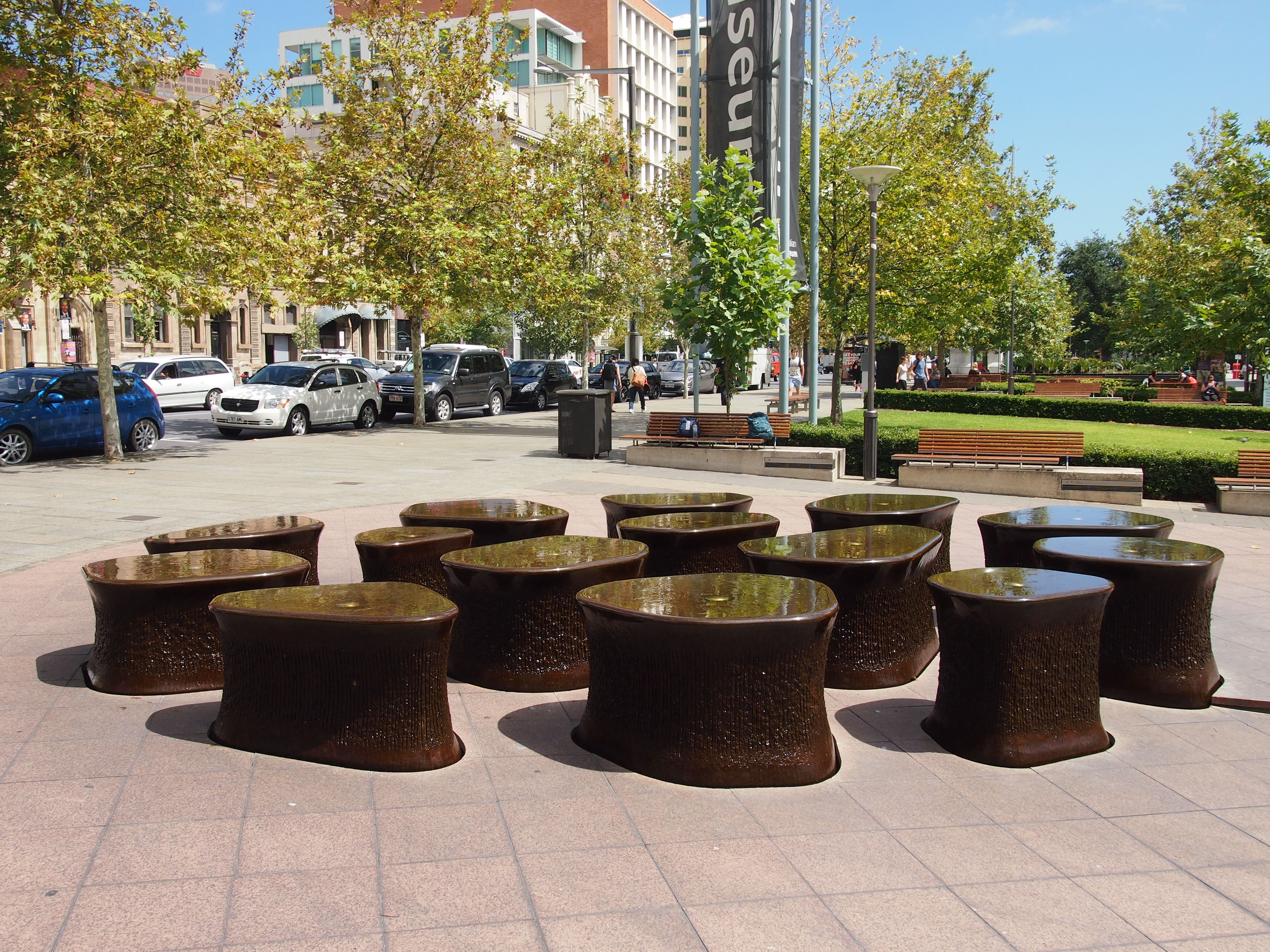
14 Pieces, based on the forms of ichthyosaur vertebrae

The following decade, Mike Rann, Premier and Arts Minister from 2002 to 2011, funded the redevelopment of the Pacific Cultures Gallery and the development of the South Australian Biodiversity Gallery.

In October 2005, a piece of public art incorporating water, 14 Pieces, situated on the forecourt of the museum, was officially unveiled by the Premier. Created by artists Angela and Hossein Valamanesh and commissioned by the City of Adelaide, it replaced the Lavington Bonython fountain that had occupied the site from 1965. Its form is based on the vertebrae of an extinct marine reptile, the ichthyosaur.

== Management and governance ==
=== Statutory obligations and board ===
The official role of the museum, as per the 2017/8 annual report, is:

...the conservation, study and appreciation of nature and culture for the benefit and enjoyment of current and future generations. The Museum's exhibitions, collections, programs and science research activities contribute to global understanding of human cultures and the natural world as well as supporting life-long learning in the community.

Its vision is to "...use [its] world-class collections to create and share new knowledge, focusing on Australian Aboriginal and Pacific cultures, Earth and Life Sciences".

As a statutory corporation, management of the museum is prescribed under the South Australian Museum Act 1976 and state and federal government regulations. The museum was a division of Arts South Australia (previously Arts SA) within the Department of State Development until 2018. After the election of the Marshall government in March 2018, the Arts Ministry was removed, Arts SA was dismantled, and its functions were transferred to direct oversight by the Department of the Premier and Cabinet. The board of eight people appointed by the Minister oversees the management of the Museum.

=== Recent leaders ===
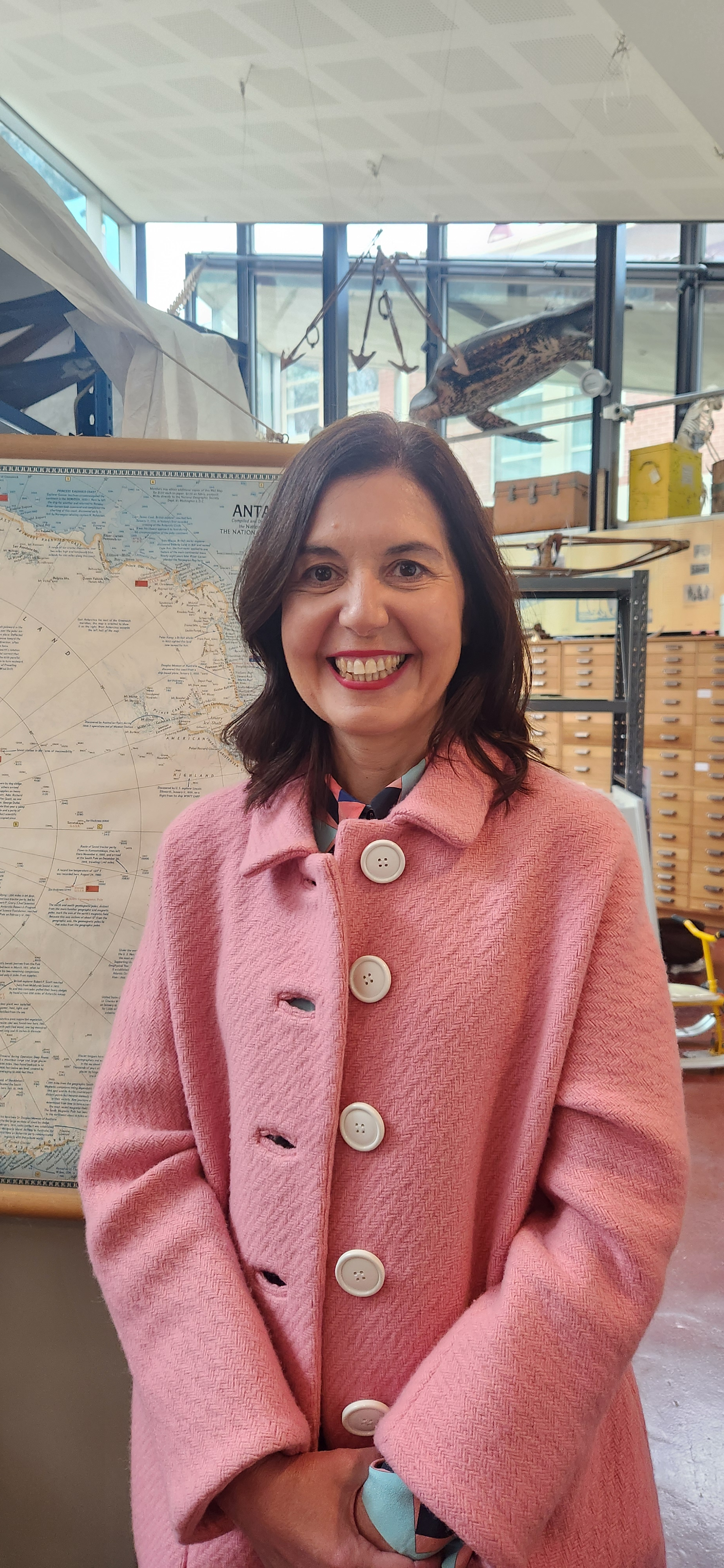
Samantha Hamilton, incoming director (from 20 October 2025)

In 2011 Premier Mike Rann appointed former Adelaide Lord Mayor and Education Minister Jane Lomax-Smith as chair of the museum board. In November 2020 Kim Cheater was appointed chair of the board. Following the shelving of the 2024 restructure plans, Cheater resigned and Robert Saint took over as presiding officer.

In March 2023, David Gaimster was appointed director, with the role being termed CEO as of May 2024. On 27 December 2024 it was announced that Gaimster would step down as CEO, with a new recruitment process being undertaken for a permanent replacement, and former City of Adelaide CEO Clare Mockler filling the position in the interim.

On 9 September 2025 Dr Samantha Hamilton was announced as the new Director of the SA Museum, with her role commencing on 20 October 2025. Mockler was appointed executive director of Arts South Australia (now CreateSA) in January 2025, with her term commencing when her role at the museum ends.

=== Planned restructure (2024) ===
In February 2024, CEO David Gaimster announced a "reimagining" of the museum, with a restructure that would entail abolishing 27 research and collections positions, replacing them with 22 new jobs of lower classification. After a public outcry, concern expressed by museum staff and major donors, and the involvement of the Public Service Union, including a protest at Parliament House in Adelaide in April 2024, Premier Peter Malinauskas intervened. In late April he launched a review panel to examine the plan. On 28 August 2024, Deputy Opposition leader John Gardner handed a petition to Parliament with over 10,000 signatories with concerns over the restructuring. On 19 September 2024 Premier Malinauskas announced that on the basis of the parliamentary review recommendations, the proposed restructure would not go ahead, and a new strategic plan would be developed through collaborative consultative process. Kim Cheater resigned as chair, with Robert Saint taking over as presiding officer. There would be "no functional or structural changes...to the museum's research and collection priorities and business models". The museum was called upon to work with local and regional universities to develop sustainable research and funding models for the museum, and the state government would provide the museum with AU$4.1 million over two years to develop the new strategic plan.

== Collections ==
The museum houses over five million objects and specimens. As of July 2025, the holdings are grouped into the following permanent collections:

- Australian Polar collection(s)
- Biological Sciences collection
- Humanities collection
- Library collection
- Mineral Sciences collection
- Palaeontology collection

=== Australian Polar collection ===
The Australian Polar collection is a collection of Antarctic exploration artefacts. Previously known as the Mawson Gallery, after Sir Douglas Mawson, in 2018 the gallery underwent development to expand the displays of two other South Australian polar explorers, John Riddoch Rymill and George Hubert Wilkins, under the leadership of senior collections manager Mark Pharaoh. Before the government started taking a hand in polar exploration in the late 1940s, all of Australia's polar expeditions (north and south) were led by these three South Australians. The Mawson collection is the largest of the three collections, containing over 100,000 items. These were acquired in two lots: one came from the Australian Museum in Sydney, while a larger collection of items was donated by the University of Adelaide in 2000. The Wilkins collection is the oldest, comprising around 100 items donated by a brother in the 1920s, while the Rymill Collection was acquired in 2006.

The Mawson Collection Trust, made up of descendants of Douglas and Paquita Mawson, provided significant funding towards renewing the gallery in 2017, which was assisted by a public appeal for donations.

As of 2025 Mark Pharaoh is senior collection manager of the Australian Polar Collection. His areas of research include: history of the subantarctic sealing industry; restoration of the first successful colour photographs taken in the Antarctic; and the collections and legacies of Rymill and Wilkins. He also undertakes scholarly research about Mawson's life in his own time, out of personal interest.

=== Biological Sciences collection ===
The Biological Sciences collection is a collection of more than three million animal specimens. In the 21st century, the collection grew to include the Australian Biological Tissue Collection (ABTC), which is the largest tissue collection in the Southern Hemisphere.

As of 2016, with over 2200 specimens representing 59 species, the museum's marine mammal collection is the largest and most comprehensive in Australia. The museum also has a dedicated facility that is unique in Australia, adjacent to the SA Water wastewater facility at Bolivar, and used for the preparation of large specimens.

=== Humanities collection ===
==== Aboriginal culture and family history ====
The Humanities collection includes "the largest and most comprehensive collection of Australian Aboriginal cultural material in the world". housing about 30,000 objects. This collection, along with several others in the museum, is being digitised, with many images and a great deal of data about each item available for online browsing.

In 2016, a private benefactor, Margaret Davy AM, provided funding for a new position for an Indigenous curator for five years, which she requested be named in honour of her late husband, William Geary. This position was known as The William and Margaret Geary Curator of Aboriginal and Torres Strait Islander Art and Material Culture, with the first appointee being Glenn Iseger-Pilkington, a Wadjarri, Nhanda, and Nyoongar man from Western Australia with a background in art curating. This was the first time in the history of the museum that a lead curatorial role had been designated for an Indigenous person.

The museum holds the biggest collection of carvings by Arrernte artist and anthropological interpreter Erlikilyika, also known as Jim Kite, who lived at the tiny and remote European settlement at Charlotte Waters telegraph station. It also holds a bound sketchbook of 24 pencil drawings of native trees, created during the Spencer and Gillen expedition and bought by Herbert Basedow before being acquired by the Museum, as well as photographs of "Jimmy Kite" and other related materials.

In 1988, Doreen Kartinyeri started the museum's family history unit, which is as of 2026 run solely by genealogist Ali Abdullah-Highfold, a Kaurna, Ngarrindjeri, Narungga, Kokatha, and Wirangu man, who started working at the museum in around 1998. Family trees have been created using detailed records, photos, and archives dating back to colonisation, including the work of anthropologist Norman Tindale, who recorded much detail about the languages, culture, and physical characteristics of the Aboriginal people he visited. Several hundred people visit the museum each year hoping to trace their family history, creating a very large workload for one person, and Abdullah-Highfold is planning to get the records digitised in a way that the community can access records online.

=== Library collection ===
The Museum Library includes reference works relevant to collection and exhibition research at the Museum, and is also a source of specialised publications for other researchers. It consists of around 17,000 monographs, 2,300 rare books, 30,000 volumes of scientific journals, and 21,200 photographic images.

=== Mineral Sciences collection ===
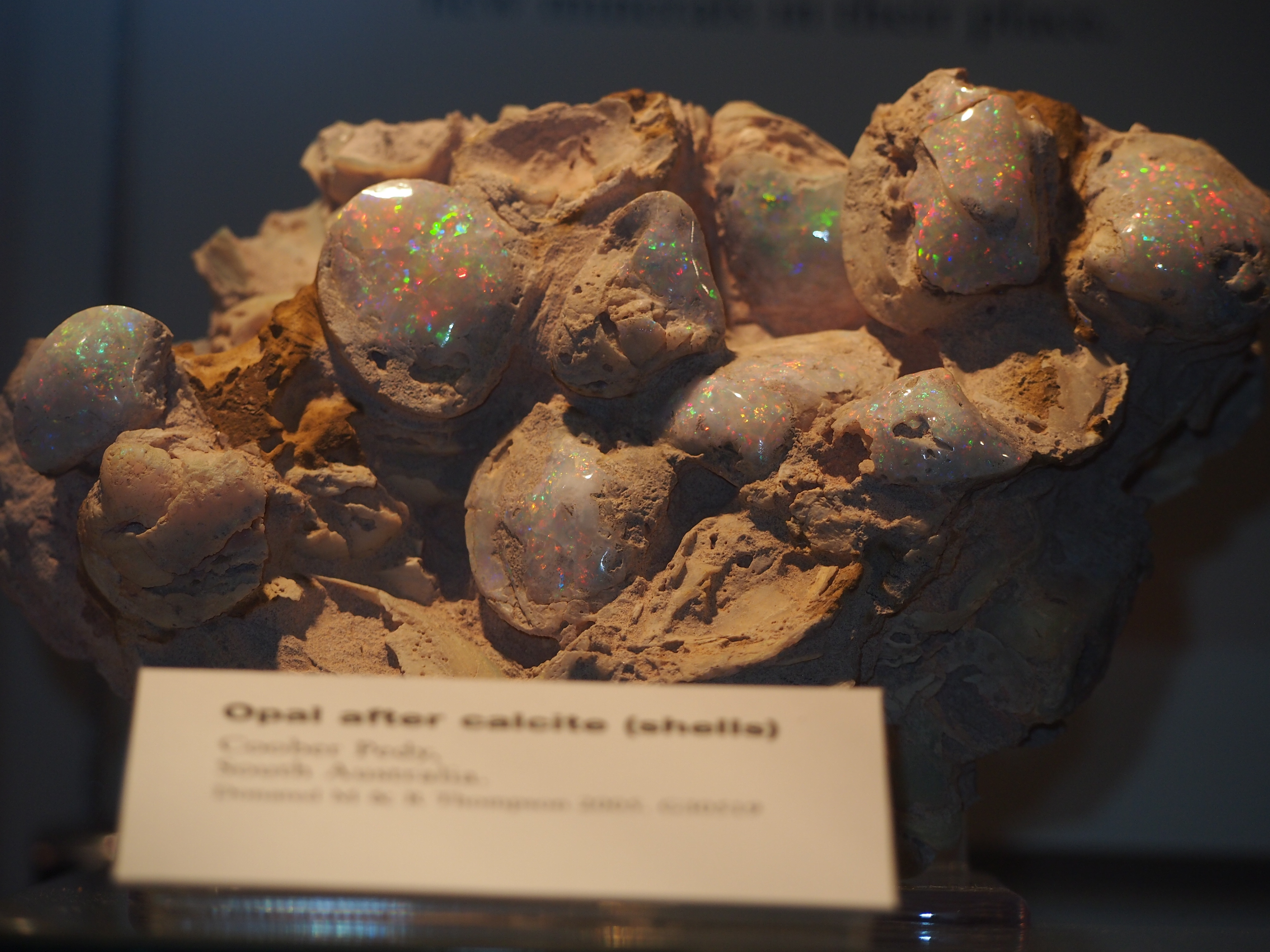
Precious opal replacing calcite of bivalve shells, from Coober Pedy

The Mineral Sciences collection includes more than 32,000 minerals, rocks, meteorites and tektites from around the world. More than 1,500 mineral species are represented in the collection, and recent (to 2023) research activities have resulted in the deposition of type specimens of 20 new species.

In his role as honorary curator from 1906 to 1958, Douglas Mawson was also instrumental in helping to establish the minerals collection. In 1906, he arranged the purchase of part of the John Henry Dunstan Collection, which contained significant specimens from the copper mines at Burra, Moonta, and Wallaroo Mines. This formed the core of the museum's now extensive minerals collection, and was at the time the largest private mineral collection in country. Mawson also assisted in the purchase of the Hall and Watkin Brown Collections, which included many specimens from Broken Hill and other important places in New South Wales. The second half of the Dunstan Collection was acquired in 1954, with the last few specimens donated by Dunstan's great-granddaughters in 2011.

The minerals collection includes a growing collection of opals, including two famous valuable opals, the Virgin Rainbow and the Fire of Australia. The purchase of the Francis Collection in 1996 added 2,000 opals to the collection, and included many minerals of the iron formations of the Middleback Range.

=== Palaeontology collection ===
The Palaeontology collection includes around 50,000 fossil specimens, including examples of the Ediacaran biota, South Australian Cambrian invertebrates, Late Triassic plant fossils, Early Cretaceous marine vertebrates and invertebrates, Tertiary invertebrates and Tertiary and Pleistocene vertebrates.

== Repatriation of human remains ==
A new museum policy has committed to the repatriation of returning the ancestral remains of about 4600 Old People, currently held in storage at the museum, to Country. Some of the remains now being returned from overseas institutions were "collected" by men like former Museum Director Edward C. Stirling, University of Adelaide Professor Archibald Watson and physician and city coroner William Ramsay Smith (who also bought remains stolen from burial grounds at Hindmarsh Island). However these numbers are small when compared with the vast majority of the remains, which were disturbed by land clearing, construction projects or members of the public.

An Aboriginal heritage and repatriation manager, Anna Russo, was appointed in 2018 as part of a wider restructure to make repatriation and Aboriginal agency a priority for the museum. Kaurna elder Jeffrey Newchurch had been lobbying the museum for years, and SAM Head of Humanities John Carty said the Museum was one of the last cultural institutions in Australia to return ownership and management of ancestral remains to Aboriginal people.

On 1 August 2019, the remains of 11 Kaurna people were laid to rest at a ceremony led by Newchurch at Kingston Park Coastal Reserve. Carty said the museum was "passionate" about working with the Kaurna people to repatriate their ancestors, and would also be helping to educate the community about what it means to Aboriginal people. The Museum continues to receive further remains, and together with the community would need to find a good solution to accommodate the many remains of Old People, such as a memorial park.

== Notable exhibitions ==
=== Waterhouse Art Prize exhibitions ===
The annual Waterhouse Natural Science Art Prize, the richest prize for natural science art in Australia and named after the museum's first curator, has been awarded in most years since 2003. Exhibitions of the work submitted for the prizes are held at the Museum.

=== 2013–2014: Traversing Antarctica: the Australian Experience ===
Rare artefacts and displays highlighting the scientific, historical, and cultural legacy of Australia's interactions with Antarctica (December 2013 – March 2014).

=== 2015: Shimmer ===
A collaborative exhibition with between JamFactory, the South Australian Museum and Tarnanthi, a national event held annually by the Art Gallery of South Australia to showcase Indigenous Australian art and culture (October–November 2015).

=== 2017–2018: Ngurra: Home in the Ngaanyatjarra Lands ===
Ngurra is a word with complex connotations, meaning home, country, camp, birthplace and belonging. Showed the creativity and ingenuity of the Ngaanyatjarra people of Western Australia in all aspects of their life and art (October 2017 – January 2018). Curated by Glenn Iseger-Pilkington.

=== 2019: Yurtu Ardla ===
Yurtu Ardla means wood in the Nukunu and Adnyamathanha languages. The exhibition, curated by Jared Thomas, is a continuation of the Ku Arts workshop series in 2015, which consisted of carving camps by Nukunu (of the Southern Flinders Ranges) and Adnyamathanha (of the Northern Flinders and Gammon Ranges) and which revitalised the Nukunu carving practices. Before this exhibition, there were fewer than 20 known Nukunu objects held by the Museum, mostly made by Nukunu man Paddy Thompson and acquired by anthropologist Norman Tindale in the 1920s. The specially commissioned piti (coolamon), thiparra (shields), wadna (boomerangs), yakadi (walking sticks) and wirri (clubs) have added to the historic items to illustrate the continuation of the tradition. Roy Coulthard is a third-generation carver in his family, who visits schools to share his knowledge. With this exhibition, SAM is adopting the practice of naming artists and identifying works for their individual artistry rather than their ethnic identity (March–June 2019).

=== 2025: Treasures of the Viking Age: The Galloway Hoard ===
Treasures of the Viking Age: The Galloway Hoard is an extensive collection of objects from the Galloway Hoard, comprising rare and unique Viking Age that had been buried around AD 900 in southwest Scotland and only discovered in 2014. In its first showing outside the UK, the exhibition is mounted at the SAM from 8 February to 27 July 2025.

== People associated with the museum ==
=== Historical ===
- Edgar Ravenswood Waite, zoologist, ichthyologist, herpetologist, and ornithologist, Director of the SA Museum 1914–1928
- Amandus Heinrich Christian Zietz, zoologist, assistant director of the SA Museum 1900–1910
- Sir Douglas Mawson, Antarctic explorer, geologist and academic, Honorary Curator of Minerals at SA Museum 1907–1958, and chair of the Museum Board of Governors 1951–1958

=== Contemporary ===
- Philip Jones, senior curator, historian and award-winning author
- Jared Thomas, Nukunu man and award-winning children's fiction author, playwright and poet, William and Margaret Geary Curator of Aboriginal and Torres Strait Islander Art and Material Culture (from May 2018 and as of April 2019)
- Jim Gehling, palaeontologist recognised for his extensive research on the Ediacaran biota and significant contributions to the understanding of early multicellular life
- Chris H. S. Watts, entomologist, who has named over 280 taxa.

=== Past directors ===
The following individuals have served as director (or equivalent) of the South Australian Museum:

| Start | End | Name | Notes |
|---|---|---|---|
| 1861 | Feb 1882 | Frederick George Waterhouse | Appointed Honorary Curator in 1860 |
| 1883 | 1885 | Johann Wilhelm Haacke | Appointed Director 2 February 1883 |
| 1889 | 1912 | Edward Charles Stirling | Honorary Director 1889–1895; Director 1895–1912 |
| 1913 | 1928 | Edgar Ravenswood Waite | |
| 1931 | 1960 | Herbert Mathew Hale | |
| 1962 | 1968 | William Peter Crowcroft | |
| 1968 | 1972 | W. Grant Inglis | |
| 1973 | 1982 | Dr John Kynaston Ling | |
| 1984 | 1993 | Lester D Russell | |
| 1993 | 1998 | Dr John Christopher Anderson | |
| 1999 | 2006 | Prof. Timothy Fridtjof Flannery | |
| 2007 | 2013 | Prof. Suzanne Miller | |
| 2014 | 2022 | Brian Leslie Oldman | |
| 2023 | 2024 | Dr David Gaimster | |

== Partnerships and corporate sponsorships ==
Partnerships and sponsorships help the museum facilitate events, conduct research and develop exhibits.

Public sector partners have included the University of Adelaide, University of South Australia, Flinders University, the Botanic Gardens of South Australia, CSIRO and SARDI. The museum also collaborates with national and international universities.

Corporate partners have included the Adelaide Festival, the Adelaide Festival of Ideas, the Adelaide Film Festival, Australian Geographic, BHP, Beach Energy, Newmont and Santos

== New Aboriginal cultural centre ==
As of 2019 the South Australian government was committed to splitting the museum, retaining a natural history museum on its existing site and creating a new gallery for Aboriginal art and culture on the site of the old Royal Adelaide Hospital, now known as Lot Fourteen. In early 2019 a consultation process was begun, involving the state government, the Museum, the Art Gallery of South Australia, the State Library, Tandanya National Aboriginal Cultural Institute, and South Australia's Aboriginal communities, in particular the Kaurna.

An update on the Lot Fourteen gallery was announced by Premier Steven Marshall in February 2020, with a scheduled completion date of 2023. However, the plans have been revisited since the change of state government in 2023, and a decision on the Tarrkarri Aboriginal centre was postponed until 2024, as the state government under Peter Malinauskas searches for philanthropic funding. After an initial cost estimate of $200m, a government-appointed panel led by Ken Wyatt and including Bob Carr and Australian Reserve Bank board member Carolyn Hewson, recommended in April 2023 that between $400 million to $600 million should be spent on the project in order to make Tarrkarri an internationally significant centre.

== Gallery ==
=== Opal fossils at the South Australian Museum ===
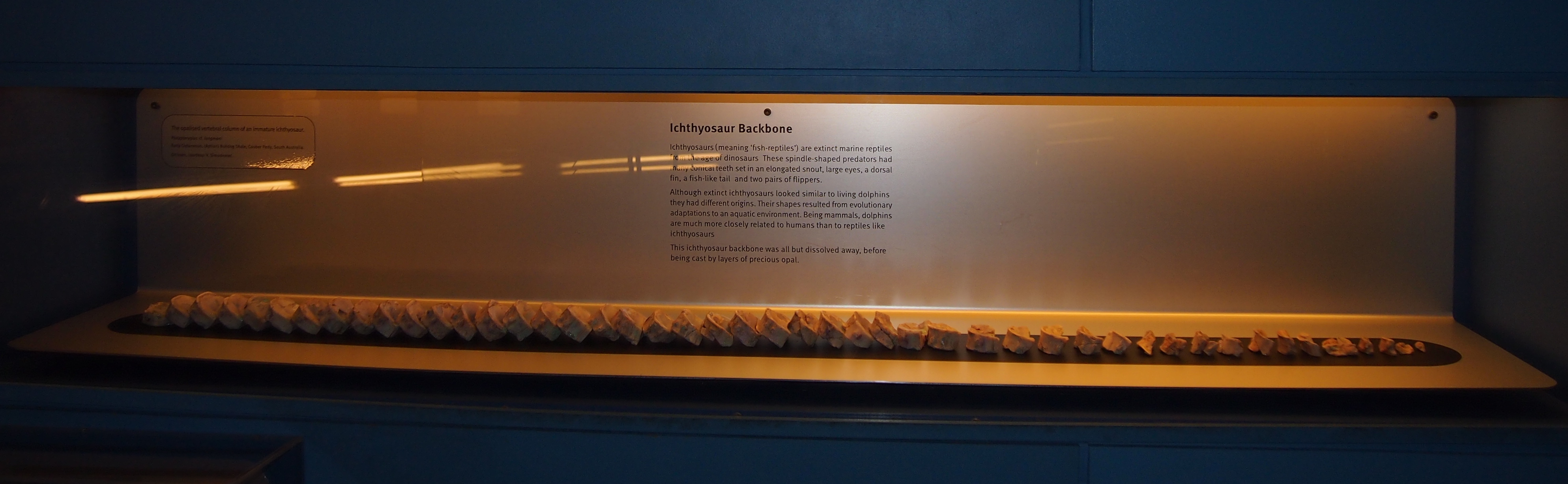
Precious opal replacing Ichthyosaur backbone

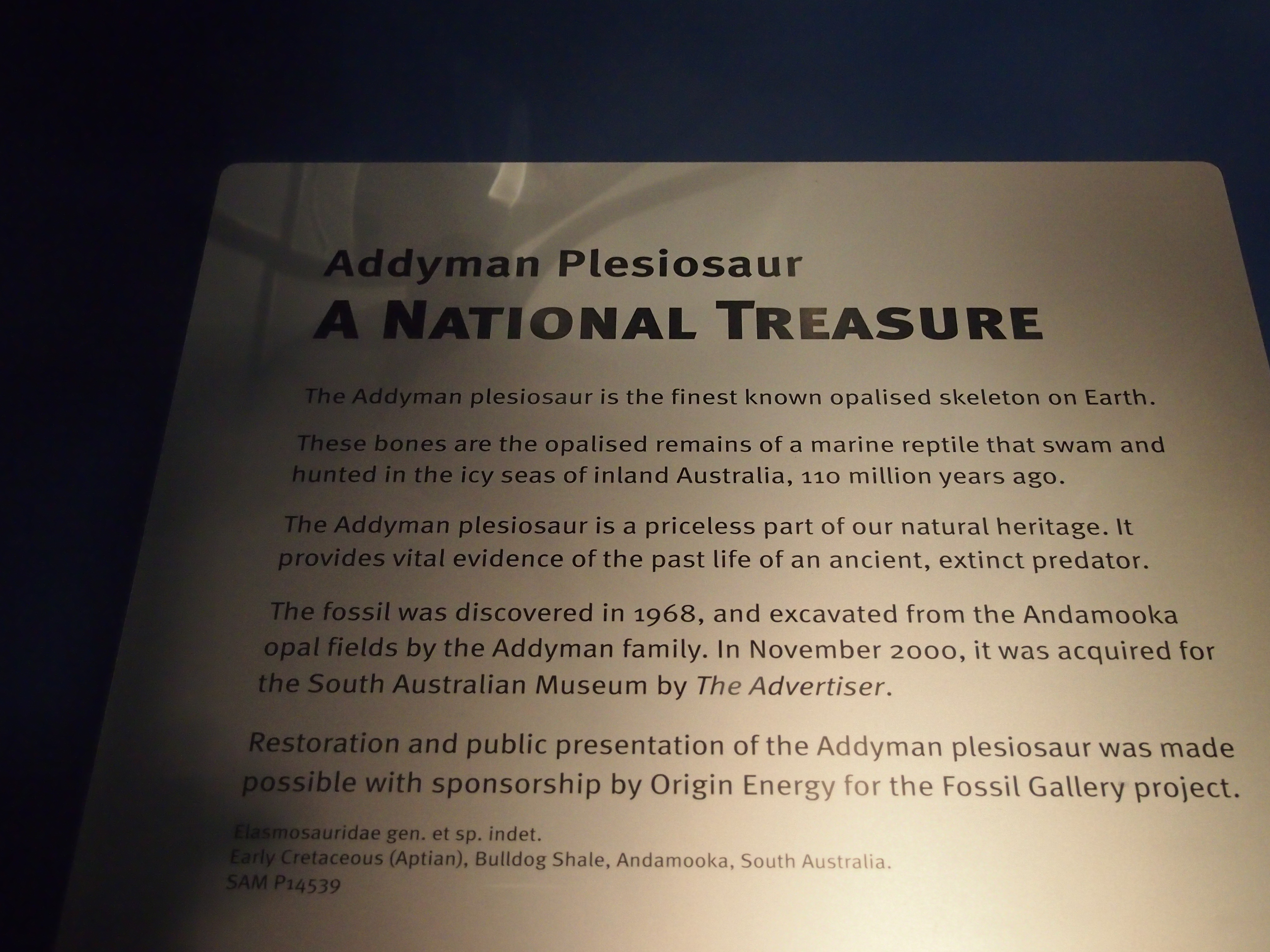
Display panel for the opalised Addyman Plesiosaur fossil from Andamooka

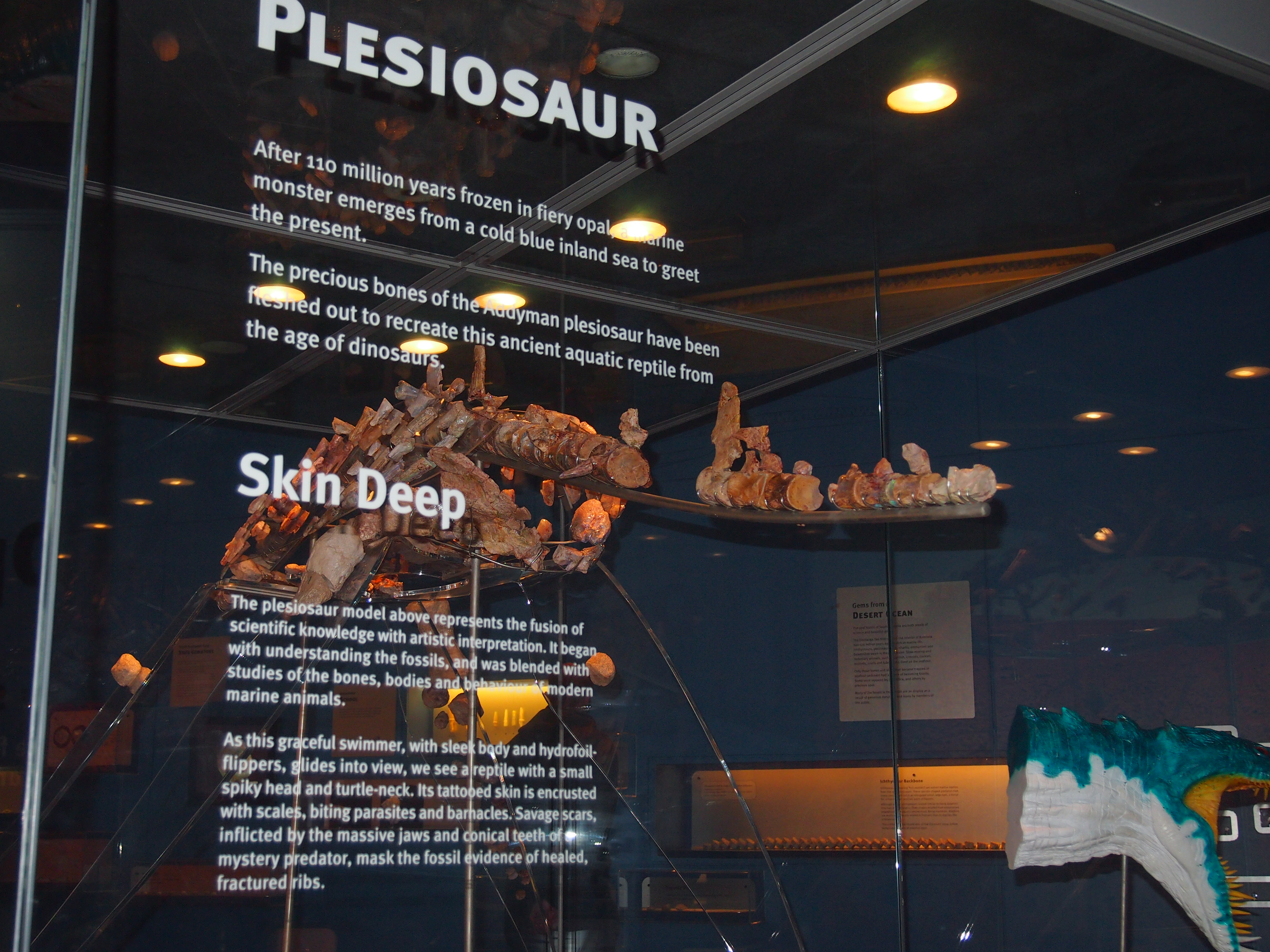
Display of the opalised Addyman Plesiosaur fossil from Andamooka

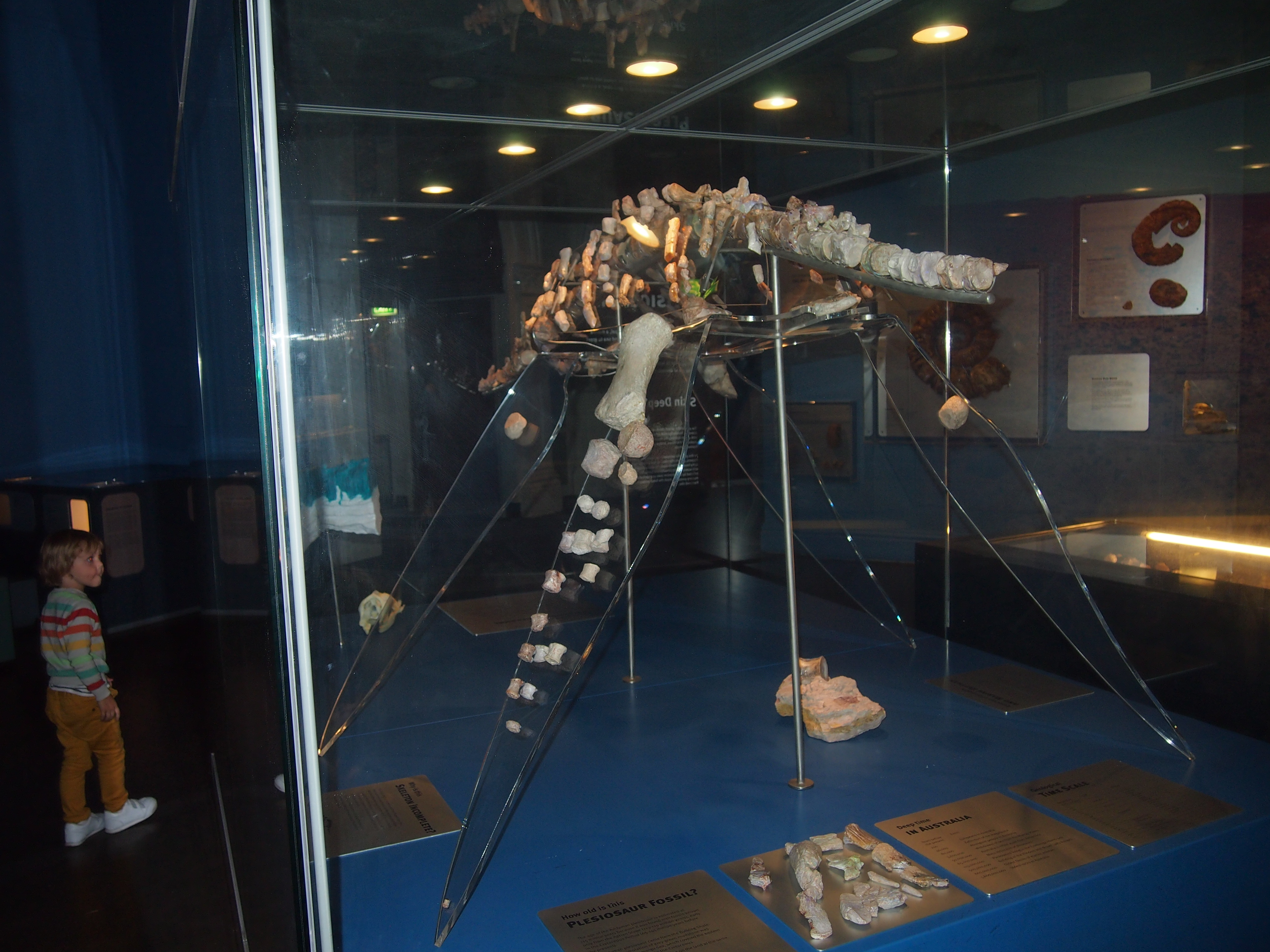
Rear view of the opalised Addyman Plesiosaur fossil from Andamooka

== See also ==
- List of museums in South Australia
