= Mimili, South Australia =

Mimili
- Town
- Coordinates: 26°59′58″S 132°42′28″E
- Country: Australia
- State: South Australia
- LGA: Anangu Pitjantjatjara Yankunytjatjara
- Location: 70 km (43 mi) W of Stuart Highway

Government
  - State electorate: Giles
  - Federal division: Grey
- Elevation: 500 m (1,600 ft)

Population
  - Total: 277 (SAL 2021)
- Postcode: 0872

Mimili is an Aboriginal community in the Anangu Pitjantjatjara Yankunytjatjara Lands in South Australia, comprising one of the six main communities on "The Lands" (the others being Amata, Pukatja, Kaltjiti, Indulkana and Pipalyatjara).

After European settlement in the 19th century, there was a cattle station on the land, which was named Everard Park. The station was purchased by the South Australian government in 1972 before transferring it to the traditional owners.

== Time zone ==
Due to its links with the Northern Territory and proximity to the border, the APY Lands do not observe daylight savings unlike the rest of South Australia. The time zone observed throughout the year is Australian Central Standard Time (UTC+9:30), in line with Darwin rather than Adelaide.

== Geography ==
Mimili is situated in South Australia, within the APY, about 70 kilometres (43 mi) west of the Stuart Highway and 380 kilometres (240 mi) south of Alice Springs.

== History and significance ==
According to the local Pitjantjatjara people, Mimili is the original name. The community grew around the Everard Park cattle station, and is surrounded by the rocky Everard Ranges. The land was handed back to the traditional owners in 1972.

The settlement was funded by the federal government as an outstation during the 1980s.

=== Significance ===
The site, surrounded by the mountains, is a special place, or sacred site, to the local Pitjantjatjara people, believed to be the site of the maku (witchetty grub) Dreaming. The maku is the local school's emblem.

== Climate ==
Based upon the climate records of the nearest weather station at Marla Police Station, Mimili experiences summer maximum temperatures of an average of 37.1 °C in January and a winter maximum average temperature of 19.7 °C in June. Overnight lows range from a mean minimum temperature of 21.8 °C in January to 5.0 °C in June.

Annual rainfall averages 222.6 millimetres.

== Demographics ==
At the 2016 census Mimili's population was 243. 69.8% of the people identified as Aboriginal Australians, 2.8% as Torres Strait Islanders. 92.5% were born in Australia. 65% reported speaking Pitjantjatjara at home; 9.6% spoke only English at home. Of those available in the work force, all were employed, about half of those being part-time. Roughly a quarter of those employed were managers, a quarter community and personal service workers and a quarter professionals.

== Facilities ==
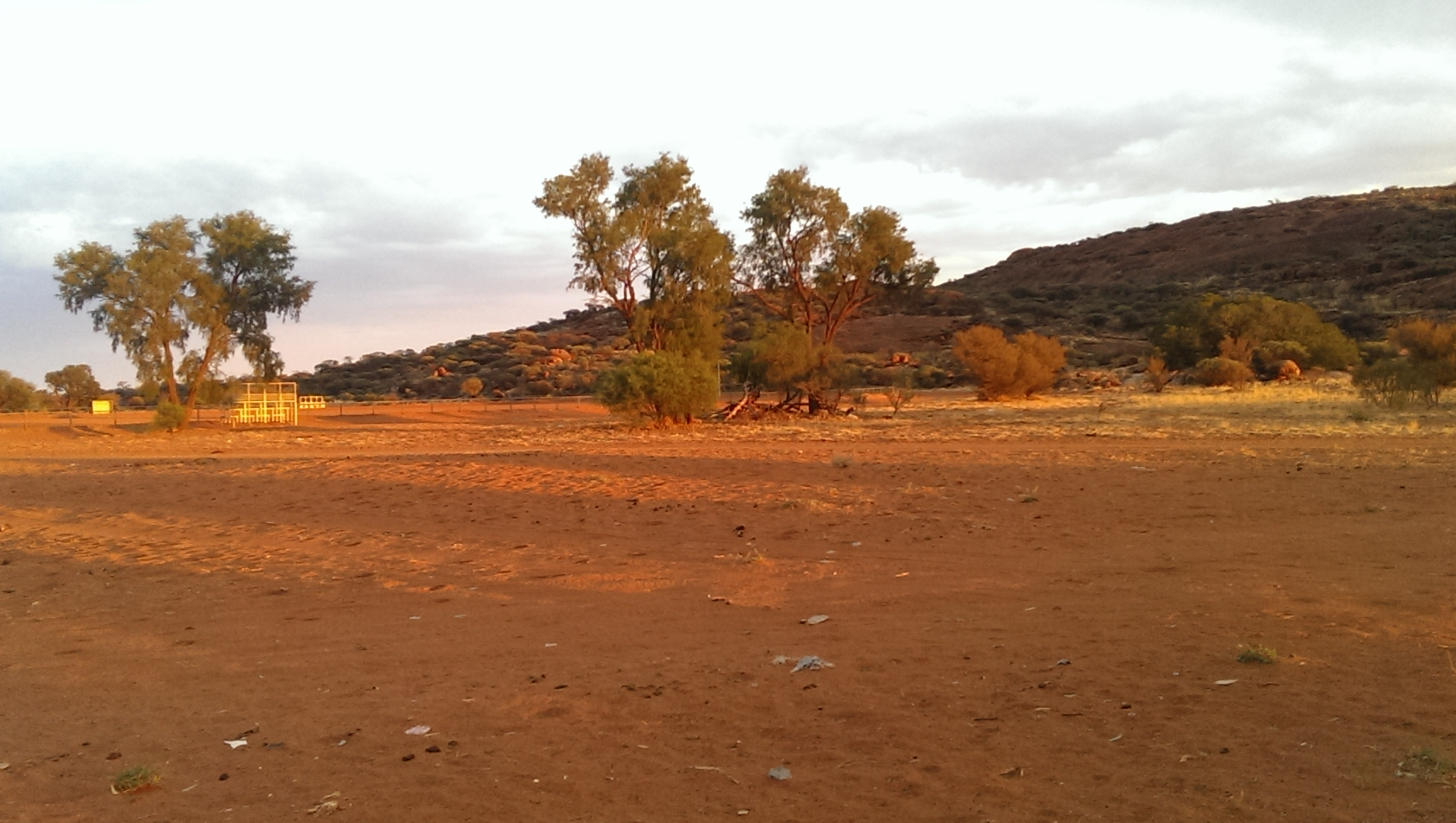
Mimili, South Australia

Mimili has an airstrip and a health facility known as Nganampa Health Mayatjar. There are council facilities. Diesel power generation facilities supply power to the community. Water is provided from 5 bores and placed in storage tanks for pumping to the community.

The Mimili Anangu School has an enrolment of approximately 60 children. Attendance at the school benefited from the construction of a swimming pool in a joint Commonwealth / State Government initiative that was operational in September 2006 and officially opened the following month on 28 October 2006 by Minister Assisting the Prime Minister for Families, Communities and Indigenous Affairs Mal Brough.

Mimili was the first community in the APY Lands to create a bush foods garden. The garden was a source of training and education for students of technical and further education (or "TAFE") in the Mimili area.

Mimili has a permanent South Australian police station, open seven days a week.

A mobile polling booth visits Mimili for elections every four years to elect the Parliament of South Australia.

A permit is required for a member of the public to visit any community on the APY Lands, as they are freehold lands owned by the Aboriginal people.

== Art centre ==
Mimili Maku Arts is one of ten Indigenous-owned and -governed enterprises that go to make up the APY Art Centre Collective, established in 2013. Its name derives from the Maku (witchetty grub) Tjukurpa, which is found in the paintings of senior artists like Betty Kuntiwa Pumani (winner National Aboriginal & Torres Strait Islander Art Award-winner 2015 & 2016 and winner of the 2017 Wynne Prize), Ngupulya Pumani (finalist NATSIAA 2015, finalist Wynne Prize 2017), Tuppy Goodwin (finalist NATSIAA 2018) and Puna Yanima.

== People ==
- Zaachariaha Fielding of Electric Fields
- Betty Kuntiwa Pumani, artist
- Ngupulya Pumani, artist

== Further external links ==
- "Google Maps reference to Mimili community".
- "Mimili Anangu School".
- "PY Media Site : Mimili community". Archived from the original on 27 September 2007.
