= Jean Napangardi Lewis =

Jean Napangardi Lewis (born 1950) is an Indigenous Australian artist. She was born on the Mount Doreen Station, in the Northern Territory. She is the sister of Dorothy Napangardi and Judy Watson Napangardi. Lewis has participated in multiple group exhibitions, including at the Flinders Lane Gallery, Kate Owen Gallery, and as part of 'Art Mob' in Hobart. She is married to Mickey Jampijinpa, and has a child Minnie. She resides in Yuendumu in the Northern Territory.
