= Mechanic =

Tradesperson working with machinery

- An auto mechanic in Ghana

Occupation
- Synonyms: Machinery specialist
- Occupation type: Skilled trades
- Activity sectors: Repair and maintenance

Description
- Competencies: Mechanical knowledge, troubleshooting, technical skills
- Education required: Apprenticeship, vocational training
- Fields of employment: Automotive, aviation, manufacturing
- Related jobs: Handyperson, technician, machinist, mechanician, millwright, engineer

A mechanic is a skilled tradesperson who uses tools, procedures, and experiential knowledge to build, alter, maintain, repair, restore, test, or improve the capabilities of machinery, especially vehicles or other mechanical devices. The term previously referred to anyone in various handicraft trades, but it has referred specifically to those who work with machinery since the early 20th century. A technician is generally a mechanic who, through higher education, experience, or a non-proficiency-based title, engages in performance or instruction of more nuanced, technically challenging operations, and generally has a greater understanding of a system's operations and specifications.

Mechanics work across a wide range of disciplines, including automotive, energy, maritime, aeronautical, civil, domestic, mining, military, industrial, agricultural, and pharmaceutical. The responsibilities typically include inspecting equipment, diagnosing faults, setting parameters of moving assemblies, adjusting flow and pressures of fluid systems, verifying proper installation of new components if installed by secondary entities, and repairing or replacing components. They perform preventive maintenance to ensure machinery operates safely and efficiently. The profession developed rapidly during the Industrial Revolution, when increasing mechanisation created demand for specialised technical skills.

Training generally involves practical experience and apprenticeship, although vocational education, formal qualifications, and professional certification have become requirements in many fields. The modern mechanic works increasingly with electrical systems, computerised diagnostics, and advanced maintenance techniques, but generally will not directly work to fix problems associated with electronic, digital, or high-precision applications, as these specialties are pursued by electricians, computer scientists, and machinists. The occupation involves workplace hazards, including exposure to noise and chemicals, the danger of moving machinery, and risk of physical strain. It may involve working with, or to written instruction from: engineers, OEMs, customers, federal or state requirements, architects, designers, planners, testers, inspectors, or any body that may have authority or jurisdiction over the mechanic's task.

== Etymology ==
The word mechanic is derived from Middle French mécanique, originating from Latin mechanicus, borrowed from Ancient Greek μηχανικός (mēkhanikós; 'of machines, mechanical'), from μηχανή (mēkhanḗ; 'machine, device') with the suffix -ικός (-ikós; 'relating to').

The word appeared in the Middle English poem Confessio Amantis, by John Gower, written in the late 14th century, spelt originally as mechanique, with the connotation of artisanry (a translation of the Latin term ars mechanica). During the 16th and 17th centuries, mechanic began to describe a labourer, and by pejoration, someone or something rude, common, vulgar. The word appears in Thomas Blount's 1656 dictionary Glossographia, providing the first definition for the occupation as "a Handicrafts man, a man of Occupation, a Trades-man".

The term previously referred to anyone in various handicraft trades, but it has referred specifically to those who work with machinery since the early 20th century.

== Specialties ==
A mechanic maintaining the brake assembly of a forklift

A mechanic is trained to inspect, maintain, and repair machinery to ensure optimal safety and performance, which may include interpreting and applying technical documentation, installing machinery, repairing or replacing components including consumables such as oils and filters, testing and diagnosing defects or issues, and certifying the machinery as fit for use.

Mechanics carry out scheduled and chronicled preventive maintenance to maximize the lifespan of machinery.

Although there are general mechanics, most mechanics are formally-taught specialists of a particular type, such as aircraft, automotive, diesel, motorsport, bicycle, heavy equipment, industrial, marine, or heating, ventilation, and air conditioning (HVAC). Mechanics can work on-site or be mobile.

Modern work often involves electronic controls and computer-based diagnostic tools such as OBD testers or PC-based diagnostic systems.

== Qualifications ==
An auto mechanics course at the Mechanics Institute in Rochester, New York, 1917

Beginning in the early 20th century, the process of becoming a mechanic was formalised, and standard skill building courses introduced.

In many jurisdictions formal certification of a mechanic's skill in their field is required before they are permitted to carry out work. For example, an automotive mechanic in Western Australia must hold a "motor vehicle repairer's certificate" (or work under the supervision of a mechanic with that certification) to offer services to the public.

Many mechanics in developing countries and even in developed ones often learn through apprenticeship.

== Types ==
=== Aircraft maintenance technician ===
Aircraft maintenance at Teuge International Airport in the Netherlands

An aircraft maintenance technician (also known as aviation mechanic) specialises in repairing and maintaining aircraft, including planes and helicopters. They work on engines, landing gear, avionics, computerized systems, and other mechanical/electrical systems.

Typically, the profession is managed by a national regulator, such as the Federal Aviation Administration, European Union Aviation Safety Agency, or Transport Canada. Obtaining a license requires passing exams on the related laws and aircraft systems, apprenticeship hours, and, in some countries, the completion of specific maintenance tasks signed off by a licensed mechanic.

Aircraft licenses may have a sub-category or specialisation, such as Canada's AME-M, AME-S, and AME-E licenses covering general maintenance, structures, and avionics, respectively.

Aircraft differ from most other vehicles in the number of inspections they require at specified calendar or flight hours. Line maintenance refers to the inspections and tasks handled between flights at an airport, including minor issues reported by the pilot or flight crew. Base and heavy maintenance refer to intensive inspections and overhauls handled at specialised hangars that involve a larger crew. Inspections are outlined by the manufacturer in a Maintenance Planning Document, while tasks are outlined in the Aircraft Maintenance Manual. Often, a critical safety issue will require an Airworthiness Directive, similar to a recall in automotive vehicles, in which all aircraft operators complete certain maintenance tasks to keep the aircraft airworthy. The most notable example is AD 2020-25844 following the grounding of the Boeing 737 MAX.

=== Auto mechanic ===
A US Air Force Squadron vehicle maintainer putting a tyre back on a truck

An auto mechanic repairs and maintains automobiles. They perform standard maintenance while inspecting vehicles for damage and wear. They test components using diagnostic equipment to replace wear-down or defective parts, and perform routine service such as oil changes or brake work. Other responsibilities include troubleshooting and fixing hydraulic lines, and repairing electric systems.

As of 1 October 2026, the median pay for an auto mechanic is around $54,959 per year.

Motorsport teams employ specialized automotive mechanics to work on race cars. Historically, some motorsport series featured riding mechanics. As the maintenance performed by a pit crew is done during the race itself, the mechanics involved are specially trained for minimal time loss with each pit stop.

==== Diesel mechanic ====
A diesel mechanic in Cameroon maintaining a diesel-powered loader

A diesel mechanic specialises in the inspection, maintenance, and repair of diesel-powered road vehicles, such as buses, tractor units, box trucks, dump trucks, garbage trucks. They also work on heavy construction and farm machinery, including excavators, backhoes, combine harvesters, and tractors.

The median pay for a diesel mechanic in the United States is around $65,000 per year.

=== Bicycle mechanic ===
A bicycle mechanic specialises in repairing, adjusting, maintaining, and replacing parts of a bicycle. They work on frames, wheels, brakes, gears, and other mechanical or electronic components.

=== Industrial mechanic ===
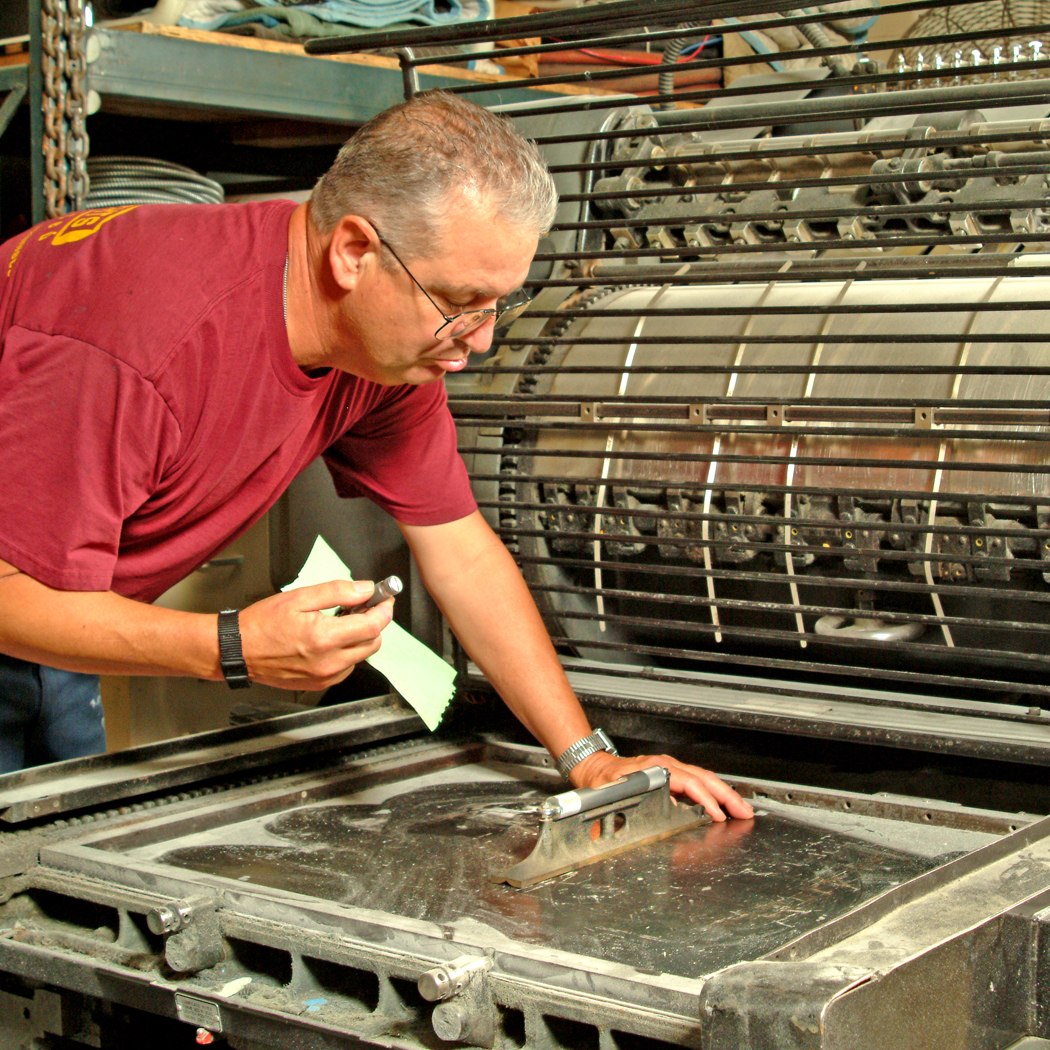
A millwright at work

An industrial mechanic works in industrial settings such as factories, manufacturing plants, and production plants. Industrial mechanics are responsible for the maintenance and repair of equipment such as machine tools, pumps, generators, and other heavy equipment. They identify mechanical problems, repair or replace damaged components, and adjust equipment to maintain proper operation. They also perform routine maintenance, such as cleaning and lubricating machinery, and use technical manuals and diagnostic equipment to locate faults. Some industrial mechanics use computerized diagnostic systems and vibration analysis to identify problems with machinery.

=== Marine mechanic ===
A marine mechanic specialises in repairing and maintaining watercraft. They work on Outboard Motor, propellers, steering systems, and other mechanical components of boats. In Britain, the ship repair and maintenance industry reached its peak in the 1940s, when over 20,000 men and women were employed for such work in Merseyside. Specialities include fitters in the engine room, boilermakers, blacksmiths, plumbers, riveters, burners, and welders.

=== Heating, ventilation, and air conditioning mechanic ===
A HVAC mechanic (heating, ventilation, and air conditioning mechanic) specialises in the maintenance, inspection, repair and installation of HVAC and refrigeration systems. These include furnaces, air-conditioning systems, heat pumps, ventilation systems and refrigeration units. In the US the career is expected to grow by 11% between 2025 and 2035. The median annual wage for HVAC mechanics in the US was $61,010 in May 2025.

=== Line mechanic ===
A line mechanic specialises in ensuring proper operation of different kinds of machinery and equipment. Their main focus is maintenance and repair; playing an important role in keeping production lines effective and efficient. The occupation is expected to grow strongly through 2035, because of factors like grid modernisation, clean energy transmission and increasing retirement rates. As of October 2026 their median income the United States was $60,039.

== Occupational hazards ==
An aircraft mechanic wearing earplugs and safety glasses

Mechanics may face a variety of occupational hazards. They are frequently exposed to elevated sound levels; in an analysis of 1999–2004 National Health and Nutrition Examination Survey data, vehicle and mobile equipment mechanics and repairers employed in manufacturing had an 82% prevalence of hazardous workplace noise exposure, the highest among occupations in that sector.

Mechanics are also frequently exposed to harmful chemicals. Exposure to engine oils causes contact dermatitis to be over twice as prevalent among automotive mechanics as office workers. Automotive mechanics are exposed to elevated levels of volatile organic compounds when applying brake cleaner and painting.

These chemicals increase the prevalence of respiratory health conditions and impair lung function. Mechanics are also at risk of carbon monoxide poisoning, with a study by the United States National Institute for Occupational Safety and Health reporting 34 fatalities caused by vehicle exhaust from 1992–2008.

Aircraft mechanics are exposed to jet fuel, which epidemiological research indicates may increase the risk of cancer or neurological, respiratory, and cognitive problems.

Poor ergonomics also contributes to workplace injuries. Mechanics can experience repetitive strain injuries and pain caused by lifting heavy objects or maintaining awkward postures to reach inside machinery. Vibrations produced by power tools put mechanics at risk of nerve damage, which can lead to Raynaud syndrome, neurosensory injury, and carpal tunnel syndrome. Musculoskeletal disorders associated with mechanic work are most prevalent in the lower back, shoulders, and wrists.

== Relationship with engineers ==
Draftsmen and design engineers of the State Highway Department at the office of Lansing headquarters in 1916

Mechanics' tools and their hands-on approach in the field

The role of the mechanic is closely connected to that of the engineer, and each depends on the other for the smooth running of machinery. However, disputes between mechanics and engineers in a wide variety of disciplines can occur, especially when the design of a product makes it more difficult than necessary to fix. This sometimes stems from overengineering, when engineers and purchasers have little experience in maintaining or operating equipment, and make design or cost-cutting decisions regarding parts and materials, affecting the ability of the mechanic to maintain or repair the equipment. An effective solution, at the OEM level, is to bring shop floor mechanics into design meetings to remedy any issues with serviceability.

Despite collaboration between the two groups at the organisational level, strict boundaries might exist in many shops. Engineers are discouraged from constructing their own designs; it is not a requisite in the field, and may even be forbidden in unionised shops such as those associated with the United Auto Workers. This boundary does not exist in every shop, and in many smaller companies, engineers sometimes walk the floor to quality-inspect the equipment, notify maintenance and occasionally lend specialised experience to help mechanics solve a problem. A controls engineer might come out to a production line to help restore service if mechanics and controls technicians face complex problems which could quickly shut down operation.

The engineer's focus can be abstract, seeking technological solutions while managing a range of complex aims and optimisations, while the practical requirements of design for maintainability affect the work of the mechanic. The theory of design focuses on efficiency and production and can be less concerned with the foresight of failure, but it is inevitable that all things break and fail, so the act of maintenance is an important consideration for engineers engaged in the design process.

== History ==
The entrance of a mechanics' institute established in 1824 in Alnwick

From the 16th century, mechanic meant "one who is employed in manual labour, one who works mechanically, a handicraft worker, an artisan". More specifically, the word being used to refer to a "skilled workman who is concerned with the making or repair of machinery" began in the 1660s, but this was not the primary meaning of the word until the rise of the automobile. For example, the Scottish textile industrialist John Kennedy recalled a growing need for "mechanics such as watch and clock-makers, white-smiths, and mathematical instrument makers" in industry in an 1815 account. The 1828 edition of Webster's Dictionary defined mechanic as "a person whose occupation is to construct machines, or goods, wares, instruments, furniture, and the like".

Before the institutionalisation of mechanics, the majority of their knowledge on the topic would be gained ad hoc. To educate artisans on their fields' underlying sciences, many mechanics' institutes were created during the Industrial Revolution and continued to be opened long after, especially during the interwar period. In the Victorian era, mechanics' institutes were set up in many countries to help improve adult education but with a particular focus on industry, mechanics, and knowledge for the adult working class. After the creation of the assembly line, cars became increasingly accessible to the public, which led to increased demand for repair shops and qualified mechanics.

The Industrial Revolution saw the widespread introduction of machines in manufacturing, as well as the spread of vehicles such as trains, later automobiles and steamships. Artisans, particularly those involved in metalwork crafts like watchmaking and tool-making, had pre-existing skills that could readily be applied in the creation and maintenance of machinery.

The trade of the mechanic became common very quickly during industrialisation when work changed unevenly. While the Industrial Revolution spanned over a century, the transition in some specific cities happened in a matter of decades. In Manchester, for example, cotton manufacturing grew rapidly during the first half of the 19th century. The mechanic shifted from being a rare artisan or a blacksmith to a critical component of the industrial workforce, although their status and recognition varied over time.

The steam engine, one of the key technological developments of the Industrial Revolution, was one of the major catalysts in the transformation of machine-making and mechanical work for new machines; it also demanded a new class of essential workers. Since the introduction of the successfully commercial steam engine by Thomas Newcomen in the year 1712, further development by James Watt, Matthew Boulton, and others helped make steam power useful in more industries during the Industrial Revolution. The improved design with Watt's separate condenser and a shaft could drive other machines through a rotary mechanism, making the engine very suitable for powering factory machinery.

More importantly, the new approach to machine-making - using higher-quality metals, more precisely made and as interchangeable components - was required to manufacture the steam engine and other important new inventive machines of the time, such as Richard Arkwright’s water frame. This spurred demand for a ‘higher class’ of mechanics capable of making and working with the new components. For example as with the machine’s gearing known as the clockwork. In general, this new approach allowed for better machines of different kinds to be made for more industries. Companies across several industries solved engineering problems and shared their solutions, which spread relatively quickly and improved machine-making techniques. This also led to the creation of specialised machine-building firms.

As machinery became more widespread, it created a fundamental shift in how work was done. Before these machines, power mostly came from animals, wind, or water. The steam engine in general allowed for the creation of massive complex machinery that could almost operate anywhere. It helped factories to be located in more places and expand production, creating an immediate and urgent need for people who understood how to build, maintain, and repair these new type of systems. Demand grew for skilled mechanics as well as for machinists and mechanical engineers.

At the height of the Industrial Revolution, machinists and mechanics were often regarded as working-class tradespeople. Though essential to industrial production, they generally held less social prestige than engineers, who designed the machines and were, in turn, considered as second rate to the capitalists, who owned the factories. Until the late 19th century, and later accelerated by the necessities of the World Wars – where "individual heroism" was replaced by "technological superiority" – the practical side of technology began to gain social recognition. Both the fixing (Mechanics) and the designing (Engineering) started from a place of low social appreciation, but they eventually evolved into respected roles: Engineering as a high-level intellectual profession, and Mechanics as a critical technical trade.

=== Africa ===
==== Tanzania ====
In Tanzania, automobiles were introduced during German and later British colonial rule. European-style cars had great difficulty traversing Tanzania due to the East African climate and unpaved roads, which they were not built for. As a result, informal garages called gereji bubu (lit. 'muted garages') were formed by Tanzanian mechanics so that they could work independently. Because of these factors, Tanzania has become a hub for mechanics and automobiles.

=== Asia ===
==== Iran ====
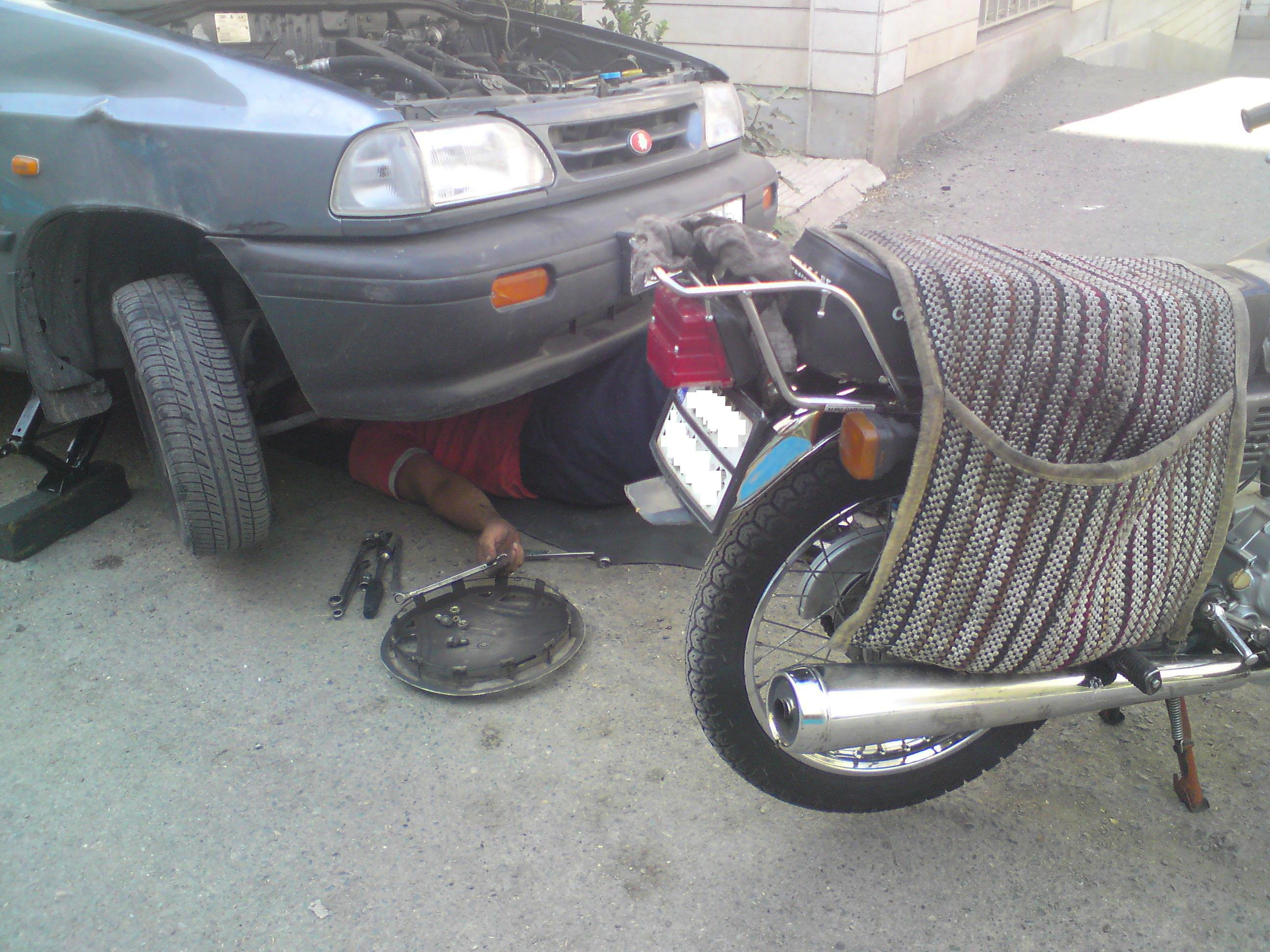
Automobile mechanic working on a car in Iran

In Iran, institutions for mechanics began appearing especially after 1921. One notable institution was a Persian-German Technical School. Other institutions could also be found in Iran for women, such as the Honarestān-e doḵtarān technical school. More institutions formed in the 1930s across Tehran, Tabriz, Shiraz and Mashhad. Government agencies like the state railroad or post created semiprofessional institutes for training. There were ten schools by 1940, and the number of such institutes increased gradually after 1953–54. In Iranian high schools in the post-revolutionary period, a system called kār o dāneš (transl. "work and knowledge") was implemented in 1982, where students would choose a professional field and spend a school day each week learning it.

=== Europe ===
==== France ====
In France, formal technical training for mechanics and other industrial trades developed during the nineteenth century, notably through the Écoles d'arts et métiers, established at Compiègne in 1803. A significant development in vocational certification occurred in 1911 with the introduction of the Certificat de capacité professionnelle (CCP), initially intended for mechanic apprentices. In 1919, this became the Certificat d'aptitude professionnelle (CAP), with eligibility extended to students attending technical schools. In the Armée de l'Air, an aircraft mechanic was known as a Mécano.

==== Germany ====
In Germany, the training of mechanics and other skilled tradespeople traditionally followed the guild apprenticeship system, with workers progressing from apprentice to journeyman and eventually master craftsman. The Imperial Trade Regulation reforms of 1897 established a more formal framework for supervising apprenticeships and conducting examinations, and further legislation in 1908 restricted the training of mechanics and other trades to appropriately qualified master craftsmen, helping establish the foundations of what later evolved into Germany's modern dual vocational training system.

Today, this dual education system (duales Ausbildungssystem) combines practical, on-the-job training at a company with theoretical instruction at a public vocational school (Berufsschule). Occupations involving mechanical work – such as industrial mechanics (Industriemechaniker) and automotive mechatronics technicians (Kraftfahrzeugmechatroniker) – typically follow a standardised 3.5-year apprenticeship program governed by the Vocational Training Act (Berufsbildungsgesetz, BBiG). Training standards are regulated nationally and overseen by competent regional bodies such as Chambers of Industry and Commerce (Industrie- und Handelskammer, IHK) or Chambers of Crafts (Handwerkskammer, HWK), ensuring uniform qualifications that are widely recognised across Europe.

==== United Kingdom ====
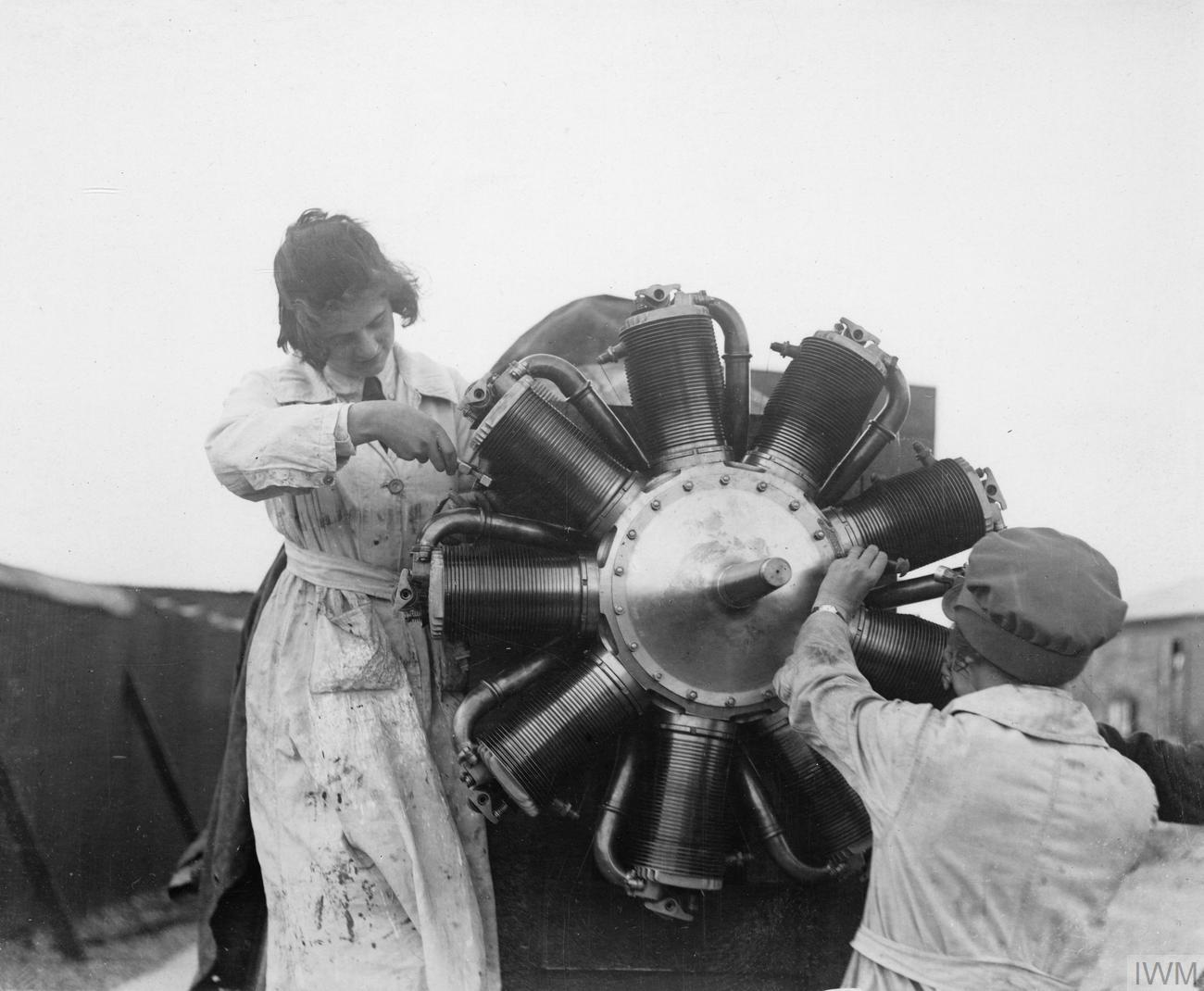
Two mechanics in the Women's Royal Air Force servicing a rotary aircraft engine in 1918

During the Industrial Revolution, mechanics' institutes, Victorian-era forerunners to trade schools, exploded in number. One of these institutes was the London Mechanics' Institute, founded by George Birkbeck in 1823. Birkbeck is credited with the systematic establishment of the mechanics' institute that year, as the decade experienced a "rapid period of growth in the number and popularity of mechanics' institutes". Technical examinations began to emerge through mechanics' institutes during the first half of the nineteenth century, with the Royal Society of Arts introducing a more coordinated examination system in 1856. The establishment of the City and Guilds Foundation in 1878 London marked a significant development in nationally recognised technical vocational qualifications for mechanics, supplementing traditional apprenticeship training.

=== North America ===
==== United States ====
During the early 19th century, the term mechanic referred broadly to skilled artisans working in trades such as metalworking and carpentry, through whom mechanical knowledge was transmitted. The establishment of institutions such as the Franklin Institute in Philadelphia, founded in 1824, provided additional opportunities for technical education. Between 1818 and 1850, approximately 100 mechanics' institutes and libraries were established in the United States. These organisations provided technical instruction and resources. Their educational programs sought to improve skills and provide opportunities for job advancement, as skilled mechanics increasingly needed knowledge of mathematics and scientific principles, particularly when seeking supervisory or managerial positions. Mechanics participated in the development of organised labour. In 1827, journeymen in Philadelphia established the Mechanics' Union of Trade Associations, which united workers from several skilled trades to advocate for improved wages and working conditions. The organisation reflected the broad occupational meaning of mechanic during this period.

Industrialisation changed the nature of mechanical work during the 19th century. As factory production expanded, machinery increasingly replaced tasks previously performed by skilled artisans, while creating demand for workers familiar with industrial equipment. This contributed to a distinction between factory operatives, who performed production tasks using machinery, and mechanics, whose work required specialised technical knowledge. The term mechanic nevertheless continued to encompass these occupations. In the early 20th century, electrification and the introduction of specialised machinery enabled greater efficiency in mechanical work. Manufacturers increasingly divided production into specialised tasks, some of which required less training than traditional craft work. Although mechanisation reduced demand for certain skilled operations, technical fields such as machine repair or inspection remained difficult to automate.

Railroad expansion during the second half of the 19th century created demand for workers specialising in locomotives and railway equipment. Railroad companies employed machinists and skilled mechanics in repair shops, while locomotive engineers operated trains. As railroad equipment standardised, companies increasingly employed non-specialist helpers alongside skilled machinists. These changes reduced the importance of some craft skills in railroad shops, although locomotive engineers retained greater control. Railroad mechanics responded to changing working conditions by forming trade unions and other labour organisations.

The expansion of the automotive industry during the early 20th century increased demand for mechanics specialising in vehicle maintenance and repair. This trade initially lacked a formal apprenticeship system, and many mechanics acquired their skills through practical experience. Vocational schools, private organisations, and the military subsequently developed training programs, although their quality varied. Beginning in 1913, the Ford Motor Company sought to standardise the sector through prescribed procedures, tools, and repair times. However, the varied nature of mechanical problems limited efforts to apply factory production methods, which continued to require skilled diagnosis and judgment.

=== Oceania ===
==== Australia ====
Automobiles were introduced in Australia during the beginning of the 20th century. By 1905, automobile associations could be found in every mainland state, declaring themselves the "experts of the Australian motor industry". These associations would keep this status by maintaining connections with employer associations, technical colleges and various trade unions to prove reliability and to formalise the job within Australia. The job, though, remained gendered and strictly leaned towards men. In 1919, Alice Elizabeth Anderson opened the first all-women's garage in Australia. After contact with European Australians began in the 20th century, Warlpiri people developed improvised solutions to maintain automobiles in the arid Australian bush. The bush mechanic subculture was popularised in the 2001 television series Bush Mechanics.

During World War II, the demand for mechanics increased due to military mobilisation. To address the resulting labour shortage, women were recruited into mechanical roles, receiving equal pay under the condition that their employment was temporary. Employers actively restricted female employment prior to the end of the war. Following the war, many returning male mechanics opted not to rejoin the trade, seeking positions with greater compensation for their military-acquired skills, which sustained the shortage of qualified mechanics. In the post-war period, as private automobile ownership grew among higher-income demographics, female participation in the trade declined alongside shifting social perceptions that framed motor vehicles and mechanics as predominantly masculine.

== Media representations ==
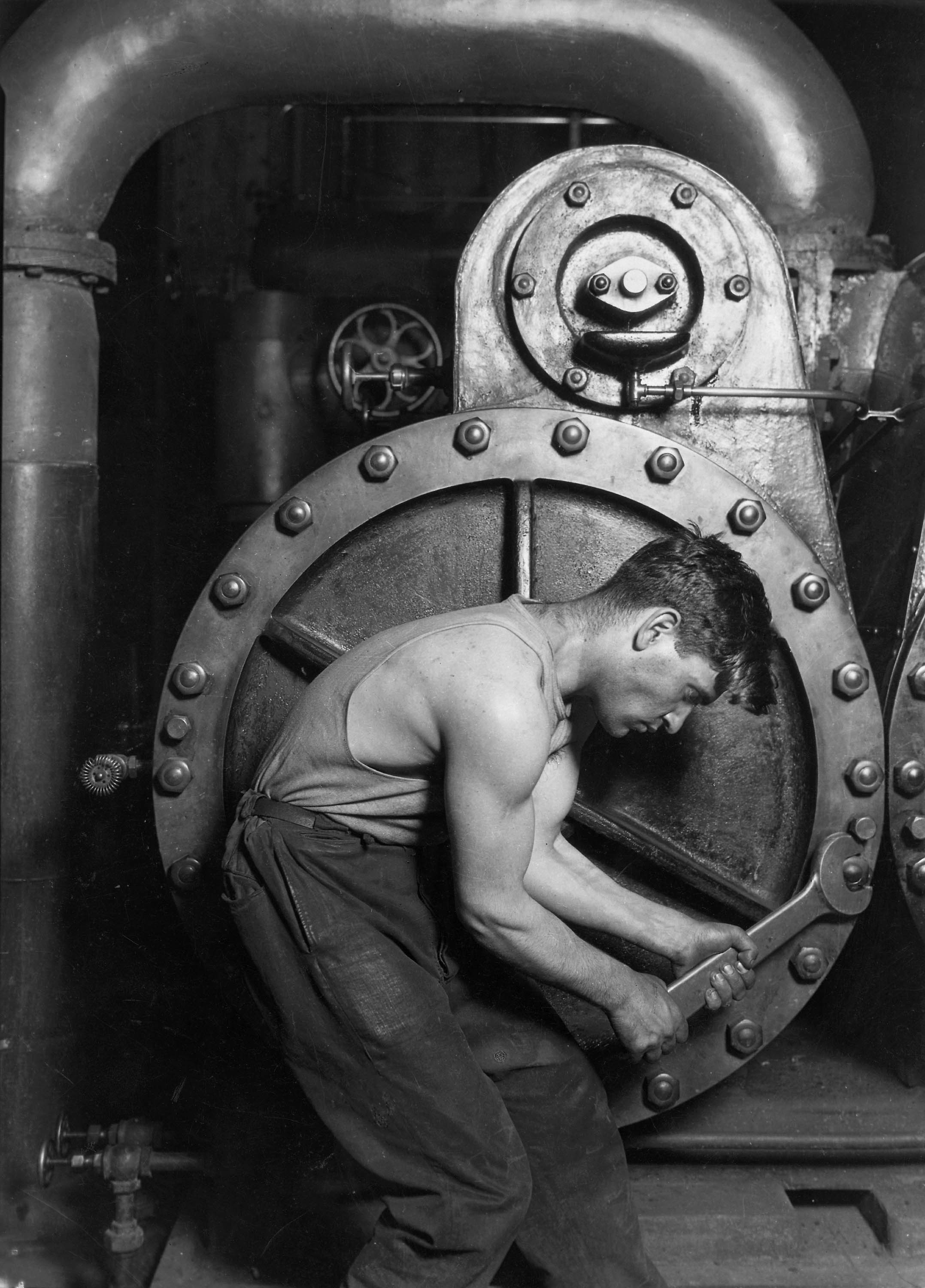
"Mechanic and Steam Pump" (1920), a staged photograph taken by Lewis Hine as part of a series about industrial workers and the rise of the machine

In the 1980s Australian soap opera Neighbours, Kylie Minogue played a young auto mechanic, Charlene Robinson, which reflected themes of women's empowerment in contemporary Australian politics.

The Studio Ghibli film Porco Rosso (1992) includes a teenage aircraft mechanic named Fio who is brave and highly skilled, part of a pattern of capable and non-stereotypical female characters in Studio Ghibli films.

In the Fast & Furious film series, a main character, Dominic Toretto, is an auto mechanic who owns a small repair shop, a component of his portrayal as a masculine, working-class hero. His expertise as a mechanic is integrated into the plot of The Fate of the Furious (2017).

In the South Korean drama From Today Engine On (2021), Kim Min-seok plays Cha Dae-hyeon, a car mechanic known in the series and its promotional materials as a "passionate genius car mechanic". Kim is reported to have received training in auto repair in preparation for the role.

Mechanics are commonly featured in science fiction works across all forms of media as stories involving interplanetary or interstellar travel frequently place significant emphasis on the spacecraft themselves and the necessitation of characters being able to repair damage or perform maintenance themselves when they may be far from port. Many characters in the Star Wars franchise, such as Anakin Skywalker and Chewbacca, maintain and repair their own vehicles, droids, and other pieces of equipment. Professor Vikki C. Terrile describes Disney's Star Wars films and television shows as having an "emphasis on amateur mechanics who must fix to survive", as well as many professional mechanics, working in environments where machine parts are in high demand and frequently scavenged and traded. These characters include Bix Caleen, Kuiil, Peli Motto, Rey, and Rose Tico.

== See also ==
- Auto body technician
- Blue-collar worker
- Charles Taylor Master Mechanic Award (aviation)
- Construction mechanic (United States Navy)
- Drywall mechanic
- Elevator mechanic
- Instrument mechanic
- Mechanics (physics)
- Mechanism (engineering)
- Panel beater
- Shadetree mechanic
