= Jack Dale Mengenen =

Jack Dale Mengenen (circa 1922 – 8 February 2013) was an Australian indigenous artist, painter, and folklorist. He was also a "custodian" of the traditional culture, stories, and beliefs of his Ngarinyin people, who inhabited the Wunaamin Miliwundi Ranges of the Kimberley region of Western Australia. Mengenen preserved the Dreaming stories of the Ngarinyin.

Mengenen is believed to have been born circa 1922 (no record was kept of the exact year) in Mount House Station, eastern Kimberley, Western Australia. His father, Jack Dale, was of Scottish descent, while his mother, Moddera, was indigenous aboriginal and member of the Komaduwah clan who had traditionally lived on the land held by the Mount House Pastoral Lease. His father was a violent man, who was known to have murdered indigenous laborers in the area. He once shot Mengenen, his own son, in the leg when he tried to run away. After Mengenen's father died an early, violent death, Mengenen fled into the rural Kimberley with his Ngarinyin mother, Moddera, who raised him according to indigenous traditions. He avoided Australian authorities, who would have placed in government-operated schools. In 1942, Mengenen survived the Japanese attack on Broome, Western Australia, narrowly avoiding strafing from a plane. His friend was killed in the raid.

He worked forty-six cattle stations throughout Western Australia as a station worker and stockman. He did not begin painting art until his retirement from that line of work. Other notable indigenous Australian artists who began artistic careers after leaving cattle ranching included Paddy Bedford, Jack Britten, Queenie McKenzie, and Rover Thomas.

In 2000, Neil McLeod, an art dealer from the Burrinja Gallery in Melbourne, persuaded Mengenen to begin creating art based on his life and his indigenous Ngarinyin culture. Mengenen traveled to Melbourne to meet with McLeod in March 2000, marking the first time that he had ever left Western Australia. Mengenen produced hundreds of paintings and other pieces through his collaboration with McLeod. He formed a close friendship with McLeod.

Mengenen's first solo exhibition was held at the Flinders Lane Gallery in Melbourne in 2000. Examples of his portfolio of work are housed in public and private collections worldwide, including the National Museum of Australia, the Art Gallery of Western Australia, and National Parliament Collection in Canberra. A major exhibition of his work was held at the Yapa Gallery in Paris, France.

Jack Dale Mengenen survived 2 major strokes in 2008 and was admitted to the Numbla Nunga nursing home in Derby. It was not expected that he would paint again. He managed to make a remarkable recovery and created some of his best work with fellow artist and friend Mark Norval during 2012. These paintings were exhibited at the Sydney's Kate Owen Gallery in November 2012. Jack Dale Mengenen died in Derby, Western Australia, on 8 February 2013, at the age of 92. He is buried at the Derby cemetery. He was survived by his wife, Biddy Dale, and daughter, Edna Dale, who are both artists based in Kimberley.
