= Minyana Tjakamara =

Australian Warlpiri leader (c. 1882–1969)

Minyana Tjakamara also known as Minjena (c. 1882 – 2 January 1969) was an Australian Warlpiri man and leader of his people who lived during a period of significant change for his people which included being moved to the government settlement of Yuendumu.

== Biography ==
Minyana's parents were Yangganu Tjupurula and Ginnula Napananga and he was born at Mount Singleton (Wapurtarli), in the Tanami Desert, approximately 400 kilometres (250 mi) northwest of Alice Springs (Mparntwe). He was one of four brothers with his brothers names being Moiu, Purjungu and Minawara.

Because of his family relationships and his conception site he was a key man associated with the Tjukurpa of the Kangaroo, Possum, Flying Ant and Yarapiri snake as well as with the Mantala (a sweet acacia gum) and Yala (bush potato).

In his youth Minyana travelled in the vicinity of Wapurtarli, remaining within a 100 kilometres (62 mi) radius with only occasional travel outside of this. Even as a young boy his intelligence was recognisied by his elders and he was chosen to be taught as a medicine man while also becoming an expert hunter and craftsman of traditional tools; he was particularly expert in making stone knives.

During his young manhood Minyana became of warrior and would defend his people against other Aboriginal groups coming in to the country, this fighting was exacerbated by the Federation Drought and the surrounding country being taken up for pastoral leases.

As he got older Minyana married and had a large family and he became a naturally respected leader of his people.

Minyana's life changed dramatically when, in 1926, his land was inspected by William (Bill) Braitling who, in 1932, used in to form Mount Doreen Station. Almost simultaneously there was a gold rush at The Granites in the early 1930s which brought with it significant amounts of prospectors. These prospectors would sometimes give Minyana and his family damper, sweetened tea and meat. Historian Dick Kimber believed that Minyana found himself both drawn and repelled by these new arrivals and was angered when they cut down a tall sacred tree.

In 1946 Minyana, his family and his people were forcibly removed to Yuendumu, which was established as a government ration depot. Despite this Minyana continued to travel regularly throughout the region and continued a hold major extended ceremonies despite pressure from the Government not to do so. He was in demand both as a ritual leader and as a medicine man.

Minyana also began to talk with and assist visiting anthropologists (including Mervyn Meggitt, Charles Mountford and Norman Tindale), filmmakers and other travelers. In one film by Thomas Draper Campbell, called Minjena's Lost Ground (1951), Minyana discussed life before European contact and highlighted the contrast between their traditional way of life and that at Yuendumu, including the negative impacts on diet and health. This film received fairly wide distribution and the National Film and Sound Archive calls it "a lament for the passing of traditional life".

Minyana became blind between 1995 and 1960.

Minyaya died on 2 January 1969 and was buried on his own Country. He is the grandfather of author Harry Nelson Jakamara.
