= Chilla Well, Northern Territory =

Locality in the Northern Territory, Australia

Chilla Well Northern Territory
- Coordinates: 21°50′14″S 131°25′37″E
- Population: 0 (2016 census)
  - Density: 0.000000/km^{2} (0.00000/sq mi)
- Established: 4 April 2007
- Postcode(s): 0872
- Elevation: 667 m (2,188 ft)(weather station)
- Area: 22,110 km^{2} (8,536.7 sq mi)
- Time zone: ACST (UTC+9:30)
- Location: 995 km (618 mi) S of Darwin; 300 km (186 mi) NW of Alice Springs
- LGA(s): Central Desert Region
- Territory electorate(s): Gwoja
- Federal division(s): Lingiari
Mean max temp	Mean min temp	Annual rainfall
30.4 °C; 87 °F	15.4 °C; 60 °F	377.8 mm 14.9 in
Suburbs around Chilla Well:
Tanami	Tanami	Anmatjere
Lake Mackay	Chilla Well	Anmatjere
Lake Mackay	Lake Mackay	Lake Mackay
- Footnotes: Locations; Adjoining localities (Note: The locality of Chilla Well fully surrounds the locality of Yuendumu.)

Chilla Well is a locality in the Northern Territory of Australia located about 995 kilometres (618 mi) south of the territory capital of Darwin and about 300 kilometres (190 mi) north-west of the municipal seat in Alice Springs.

The locality consists of the following land (from north to south) - part of the Central Desert Aboriginal Land Trust, the Mala Aboriginal Land Trust, the Yuendumu Aboriginal Land Trust and the Yunkanjini Aboriginal Land Trust. The locality fully surrounds the locality of Yuendumu and partially surrounds the Mount Doreen Station pastoral property to the west on the property's north, east and south sides. It has an area of 22,110 square kilometres (8,540 sq mi). The Tanami Road passes through the locality from the south to the north-west via Mount Dooreen Station on its way to Halls Creek in Western Australia.

The locality’s boundaries and name were gazetted on 4 April 2007. Its name is derived from the pastoral station of the same name, although there is a well located within the locality with the name "Chilla Well."

The 2016 Australian census which was conducted in August 2016 reports that Chilla Well had no people living within its boundaries.

Chilla Well is located within the federal division of Lingiari, the territory electoral division of Gwoja and the local government area of the Central Desert Region.
