= Dolly Nampijinpa Daniels =

Australian artist (1936–2004)

- Born: 1936; Warlukurlangu, Northern Territory, Australia
- Died: November 2004 (aged 67–68); Yeundumu, Northern Territory, Australia
- Known for: Artwork on Acrylic Canvas
- Notable work: The Magic Fire at Warlukurlangu (A Dreaming Narrative)
- Style: Ancestral Design depicting Aboriginal Dreamtime

Dolly Nampijinpa Daniels (1936–2004) was an Australian Aboriginal ritual leader, Warlipiri speaker, renowned artist, and land -rights advocate for the Warlipiri people of the Northern Territory.

== Early life ==
Dolly Nampijinpa Daniels was born in 1936 at Warlukurlangu, north-west of Alice Springs in the Northern Territory. She was born in the Australian bush and maintained a spiritual connection to her homeland throughout her life. The meaning of home for Daniels encompassed both the geographical and social landscapes of her home country.

Daniels lived for many years as a traditional nomad, hunting with her family, before moving with her husband to Mt. Doreen station after the death of her father and then onto Yuendumu, an area approximately 300 km north-west of Alice Springs. Alongside a number of Warlipiri people, she was forcibly removed from these lands by authorities and trucked to Lajamanu, another government settlement, but eventually made the journey back to Yuendumu where they settled.

== Personal life ==
Daniels was an active member in the Yuendumu community, a Warlipiri speaker and was recognised as ‘boss’ for the women’s ceremonies in her area. She was once described by Galarrwuy Yunupingu as a person “that doesn’t talk much, but had a strong presence and knows who she is and what she’s doing”. Whilst Daniels was a traditional Warlpiri woman, she also showed an early interest in promoting Warlpiri culture beyond the confines of the settlement. Through marriage and family ties Daniels was able to gain fluency in languages and rituals beyond Yuendumu. She went on to use this extensive knowledge to not only educate the Warlipiri, but numerous non-Aboriginal researchers as well, helping several people in the process.

== Art ==
Daniels began painting in the 1980s with the anthropologist Francoise Dussart. She began by painting ancestral designs on acrylic canvas in a style that has become known as Aboriginal ‘dot’ painting. Her paintings adhere very strongly to traditional templates for painting, but creativity can be seen in the handling of the painting, arrangement of the motifs and size and placement of the dots. Her work is made most distinguishable due to their bright colours and intricate patterns. Her works celebrate Australian Aboriginal Dreaming and culture and thoroughly invoked the Warlipiri concepts of ‘country’, ‘home’ and ‘camp’ in her work. She painted both her own and her father’s dreamings and states “it is our story - Aboriginal people’s story”. She was part of the South Australian Museum’s Yuendumu.

In her mission to promote Warlpiri culture, Daniels helped found and subsequently chair the Warlukurlangu Artists Association and Art Centre, which continues to thrive as one of the longest running and most successful Aboriginal-owned art centres in Central Australia.

=== Exhibitions ===
Daniels’ first exhibited her work in 1985 at the Araluen Arts Centre in Alice Springs. It was from here that she gained world-renowned acclaim. Her major exhibitions and collaborations are listed below :

- “Warlukurlangu Arts”, 1986 onwards, Yuendumu collaboration.
- “Yuendumu: Paintings out of the Desert”, March 1988, South Australian Museum, Adelaide, South Australia.
- “Dreamings: Art of Aboriginal Australia”, 1988, New York, Los Angeles, Melbourne and Adelaide.
- “L’été Australien” 1990, Musée Fabre, Montepellier, France.
- “Frames Of Reference: Aspects of Feminism and Art”, 1991.
- “Top Heavy” Sutton Gallery, May 1993, Dolly Nampijinpa Daniels/Anne Mosey collaboration.
- “Biennale Celebration”, 1993, Sydney.
- Aratjara Indigenous Art, Kunstsammlung Norhrheinwestphalein, Düsseldorf, 1993.
- “Ngurra” (camp/home/country), 1994, Dolly Nampijinpa Daniels/Anne Mosey Collaboration.

A selection of her work is permanently on exhibition in the National Gallery Of Victoria, AM Gallery, Warlukurlangu Arts Centre and the National Museum of African and Oceanic Art, Paris.

=== Influences ===
One of the major influences on Daniels’ art has been collaborator, Anne Mosey, also a renowned artist. The pair first met in Central Australia in 1989 and exchanged ideas on modes of representing country and the cultural meaning behind such practices. They have collaborated on several internationally recognised projects, whilst still remaining faithful to their own cultures. Daniels’ family have also had an influential role in her life, particularly her younger sister Evelyn who often painted with Daniels before her death.

== Land rights activism ==
Daniels was also a proud land rights activist who was particularly interested in the rights of Indigenous Australian people and their lands. She fought strongly for the rights of Aboriginal Australians to have access to their land in order to live a traditional and sustainable way of life. In her work she maintained strong ties to the Central Land Council and was a key participant in the famous land claims of 1976 and 1984, which returned large tracts of the Central Australian desert back to the Warlpiri people.

Daniels and her team lodged a complaint in December 2000 regarding the area around New Haven Pastoral Station in the case "Nelson v Northern Territory of Australia FCA 1343". In December 2010 it was decided by the federal court that the request would be accepted in the form of a free agreement, as outlined by the team, the area held importance to the Jipalpa- Wintijaru, Pikilyi, Yarripilngu, Karrinyarra and Winparrku landholding groups, to which Daniels had ties to.

== Publications and Community Service ==
Daniels wrote a dreaming narrative, titled “The Magic Fire of Warlukurlangu”, which was published by Kingswood Working Title Press in 2003. The book was aimed towards primary school aged children and retells a traditional tale of Daniels' Dreaming area. This book has been used to educate non-Indigenous children of the Dreamings and their significance.

In her service to the community, Daniels was a loyal member of the Yuendumu night patrol, as locals were concerned about the way in which Aboriginal issues become processed through bureaucracies.

== Death ==
Dolly Nampijinpa Daniels died of cancer in November 2004 surrounded by her kin.
