= Braitling =

- Suburb
- Coordinates: 23°40′51″S 133°52′9″E
- Country: Australia
- State: Northern Territory
- City: Alice Springs
- LGA: Town of Alice Springs

Government
  - Territory electorates: Braitling; Namatjira
  - Federal division: Lingiari

Area
  - Total: 1.5 km^{2} (0.58 sq mi)

Population
  - Total: 3,149 (2016 census)
  - Density: 2,100/km^{2} (5,440/sq mi)
- Postcode: 0870
- Mean max temp: 28.9 °C (84.0 °F)
- Mean min temp: 13.3 °C (55.9 °F)
- Annual rainfall: 282.8 mm (11.13 in)

Braitling is a suburb of the town of Alice Springs in the Northern Territory, Australia. It is on the traditional Country of the Arrernte people.

The suburb is named after Bill and Doreen Braitling, who established Mount Doreen Station in 1930.

== Sport ==
Arunga Park Speedway 23°40′13″S 133°52′33″E on the eastern edge of Braitling, off the Herbert Heritage Dr hosted important motorcycle speedway events, including qualifying rounds of the Speedway World Championship (starting in 1986).

== See also ==
- Electoral division of Braitling
