= Vaughan Springs =

Vaughan Springs may refer to:

- A location near Vaughan, Victoria, a village in Victoria, Australia
- Vaughan Springs, also known as Pikilyi, a location in Northern Territory, Australia, on Mount Doreen Station pastoral lease
