= Anthea Hamilton =

British artist (born 1978)

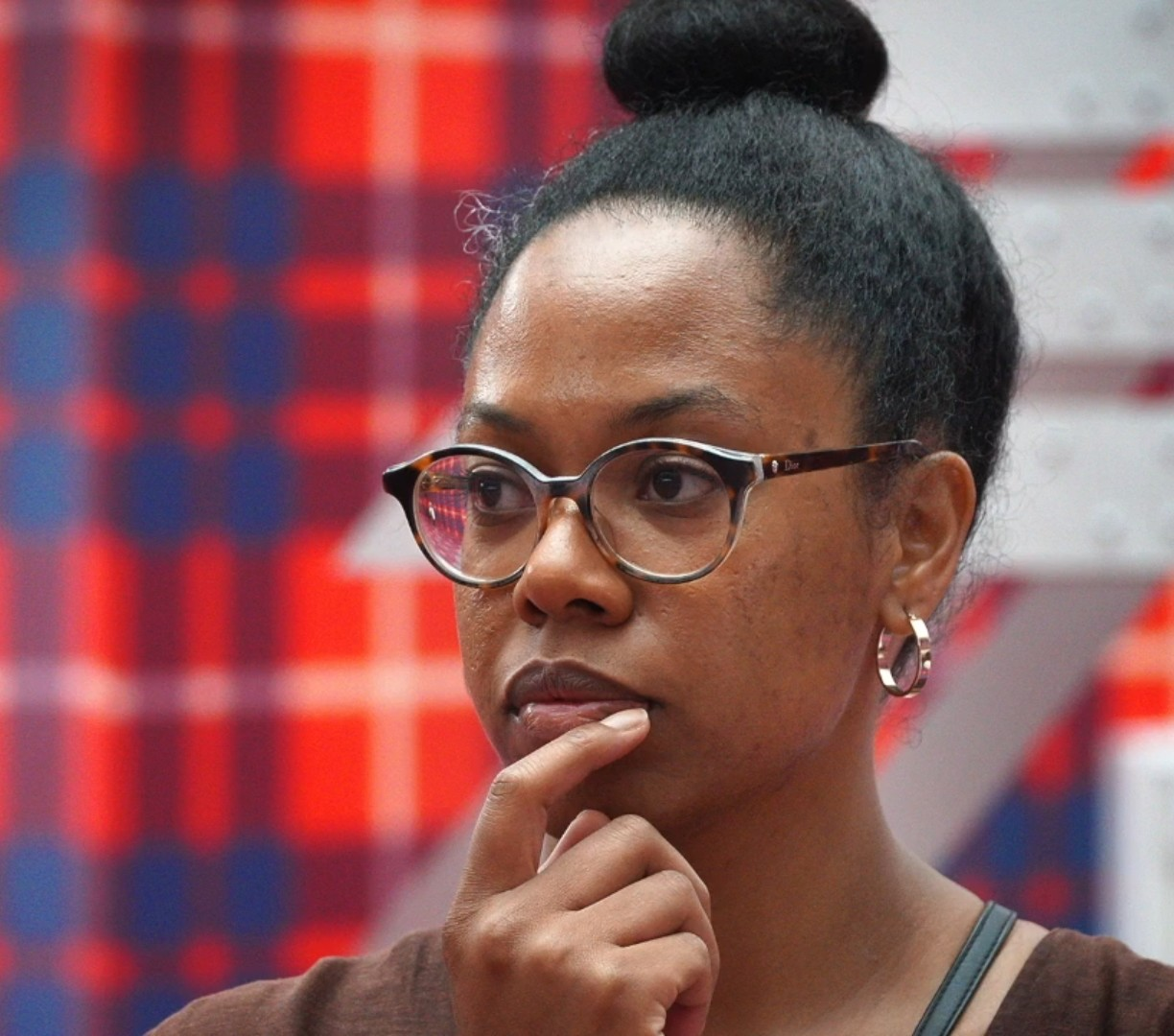
Anthea Hamilton, 2018

Anthea Hamilton (born 1978) is a British artist who graduated from Leeds Metropolitan University (Leeds Beckett University) and the Royal College of Art and was one of four shortlisted for the 2016 Turner Prize. Hamilton was responsible for the show's most popular exhibit Project for a Door (After Gaetano Pesce) depicting a doorway consisting of large naked buttocks which reworks a proposal by Italian architect Gaetano Pesce, dating from the early 1970s . She is known for creating strange and surreal artworks and large-scale installations.

Her exhibitions have included Sorry I'm Late at Firstsite.

In 2017 she became the first black woman to be awarded a commission to create a work for Tate Britain's Duveen Galleries, and according to Alex Farquharson, Tate Britain's director, Hamilton has made a "unique contribution to British and international art with her visually playful and thoughtful works". Her sculptures feature collage-like images which reuse images from her previous works.

== Early life ==
Hamilton was born in 1978 in London, where she lives and works. She expressed no interest in becoming an artist as a child and she told her mother at an early age that she wanted to be an accountant, because of her love for maths.

== Solo exhibitions ==
- 2018: The New Life, Secession, Vienna, Austria
- 2018: The Squash, Tate Britain, London, UK
- 2015: Donuts, Fig-2, ICA, London, England
- 2014: LOVE (with Nicholas Byrne), Glasgow International, Glasgow, Scotland
- 2013: LET’S GO!, Bloomberg Space, London, England
- 2012: Kabuki, The Tanks, Tate Modern, London, England
- 2009: Calypsos (in collaboration with Nicholas Byrne), Studio Voltaire, Zoo Art Fair, London, UK, Anthea Hamilton, Ibid Projects, London, UK
- 2009: Spaghetti Hoops (curated by Jill Gasparina and Caroline Soyez-Petithomme), La Salle de bains, Lyon, FR
- Turnhalle (Gymnasium), Kunstverein Freiburg, Freiburg, DE
- 2008: Gymnasium, Chisenhale Gallery, London, UK
- 2007: Anthea Hamilton and Thomas Kratz, Mary Mary, Glasgow, UK
- 2007: Cut-outs, Galerie Fons Welters, Amsterdam, the Netherlands
- 2007: Art Statements Art Basel 38, Basel, Switzerland
- 2006: Solo Presentation, Liste 06: The Young Art Fair, Basel, Switzerland
- 2005: How Deep Is Your Love?, Vision On, London, UK
