= Michael Eather =

Australian artist

Michael Eather (born 1963) is a contemporary Australian artist based in Brisbane, who helped found the Campfire Group, a significant cross-cultural artistic collaboration between Indigenous and non-Indigenous artists.

Eather grew up and was educated in Tasmania. Following his graduation from the Tasmanian School of Art, University of Tasmania with a Bachelor of Fine Arts (Sculpture) in 1983, he spent time in the Indigenous community of Maningrida, which became the starting point for decades of inter-cultural artistic collaboration.

in 1996, he established a long-term partnership with well-known Aboriginal artist Kumantje Jagamara (1946–2020).
