= Warlpiri Youth Development Aboriginal Corporation =

Aboriginal Australian youth services organisation

The Warlpiri Youth Development Aboriginal Corporation (WYDAC), formerly known as the Mt Theo Program and then the Mt Theo-Yuendumu Substance Misuse Aboriginal Corporation, is a provider of youth services and programs for young Warlpiri people, founded and run by Warlpiri people in Central Australia, with its home base in Yuendumu community. It was previously a successful youth diversion and development program.

== History ==
The Mt Theo program was established in 1993 to address an epidemic of petrol sniffing at Yuendumu. Initially Warlpiri elders, with the key support of the community members and community organisations such as the school and shop, ran the program at their own expense. They took groups of young sniffers to Mount Theo (Purturlu) outstation, about 160 kilometres (99 mi) away from Yuendumu, on sacred and remote country. The young people were taught traditional culture, skills such as hunting and gathering and how to care for the environment. With success came some government funding.

The Mt Theo Program was first supported by the Alcohol Education and Rehabilitation Foundation and the Foundation for Young Australians, but by 2006/7 it was also supported by the Commonwealth Office of Aboriginal and Torres Strait Islander Health and the Mental Health Workforce Division, and by this time was named the Warlpiri Youth Development Aboriginal Corporation. The program featured in the media, and Peggy Brown, Johnny Miller and Andrew Stojanovski were awarded Order of Australia medals. Mt Theo was selected by the Department of Health and Ageing as a "national model and leader in addressing substance misuse in Aboriginal communities, and a program of excellence", to represent Australia at the 2006 Healing Our Spirits Worldwide Conference in Canada. It was able to report 365 days without petrol-sniffing in their community.

In 2002 the service was expanded to include services for youth outside of school hours, to engage them and develop their leadership potential. This was called the Jaru Pirrjirdi (Strong Voices) program. In the few years following, other Warlpiri communities at Willowra, Nyirrpi and Lajamanu also developed youth programs, and in 2008 Yuendumu Swimming Pool was opened, all run by WYDAC. Since 2009, professionally qualified counsellors and other staff provide further support services, including a crisis response service.

The Mt Theo/Yuendumu Substance Misuse Aboriginal Corporation changed its name to the Warlpiri Youth Development Aboriginal Corporation in 2008 at a meeting of its committee, members and staff. Although it continued to be colloquially known as the "Mt Theo Program", it was felt that the official name should be changed to more accurately reflect what the organisation was then doing, having (essentially) won the war on petrol-sniffing.

The Warra-Warra Kanyi Counselling Service was started in 2009 as a new initiative by WYDAC to provide specialised counselling services to young Warlpiri people, through a Warlpiri-designed service.

== Description ==
Since 1993, the Mt Theo program has helped to rehabilitate over 500 "at risk" young people, regardless of substance abuse, from many different communities. Clients are referred by community elders, police or NT Corrections. As of 2020 WYDAC is supported by the Australian Government through the Department of the Prime Minister and Cabinet and the Department of Social Services; the Northern Territory Government through its Department of Health and Department of Sport and Recreation; and the Warlpiri Education and Training Trust. It is also supported by the Central Australian Youth Link-up Service and Royal Life Saving Australia is a partner.

The organisation continues to be run by Warlpiri people, and As of 2020 employs over 70 people over five locations. The Youth and Family Services division runs numerous services and programs, including the swimming pool, Mt Theo program, Restorative Justice and Court Diversion for Young People, and the Tanami Kamina-Kamina Wirntija-ku (Tanami Girls Dance and Culture Camp). Under its Corporate Services wing, it runs a training workshop for mechanics.

== See also ==
- Aboriginal Australians
