= Alma Nungarrayi Granites =

Australian Walpiri artist (1955–2017)

Alma Nungarrayi Granites (1955–2017), a Warlpiri woman, was an Australian artist. She lived at Yuendumu, and was known for painting Yanjirlpirri, (Note: also Yanjirlpirri Jukurrpa or Napaljarri-Warnu, Seven Sisters Dreaming) Star Dreaming.

== Works ==
Her works are held in the collections of Artbank (Untitled), the Holmes à Court Gallery (Yanjirlpirri or Napaljarri-warnu Jukurrpa diptych, and Yanjirlpirri or Napaljarri-warnu Jukurrpa), the San Antonio Museum of Art (Yanjirlpirri Jukurrpa), the Kluge-Ruhe Aboriginal Art Collection of the University of Virginia (Napaljarri-warnu Jukurrpa [Seven Sisters Dreaming] 2011) and the Australian Museum.

== Exhibitions ==
Granites' work has been exhibited at the Holmes à Court Gallery (Stardust Memories, group), and the San Antonio Museum of Art (Of Country and Culture: The Lam Collection of Contemporary Australian Aboriginal Art, group).

== See also ==
- Pleiades in folklore and literature#Australia
