= Kumantje Jagamara =

Aboriginal Australian painter (c.1946–2020)

Kumantje Jagamara AM (c.1946 – November 2020), also known as Kumantje Nelson Jagamara, Michael Minjina Nelson Tjakamarra, Michael Nelson Tjakamarra and variations (Kumantye, Jagamarra, Jakamara), was an Aboriginal Australian painter. He was one of the most significant proponents of the Western Desert art movement, an early style of contemporary Indigenous Australian art.

== Early life and education ==
Kumantje Jagamara (the name preferred by his family) was born at Pikilyi, aka Vaughan Springs, Northern Territory (about 105 kilometres (65 mi) west of Yuendumu), around 1946. His parents were both Walpiri and his father was an important "Medicine Man" in the Yuendumu community.

He lived a traditional lifestyle, and his grandfather taught him sand-, body-, and shield-painting.

He first saw white men at Mount Doreen Station, and remembers hiding in the bush in fear. Jagamara lived at Haasts Bluff for a time with the same family group as Long Jack Phillipus Tjakamarra. Later his parents took him to Yuendumu for European education at the mission school.

== Career ==
He left school after initiation and spent some time working jobs such as pig shooting, driving trucks and droving cattle. He spent time in the Australian Army before coming back to Yuendumu and then moving to Papunya in 1976 (after the death of his father) to settle and marry Marjorie Napaltjarri. He worked in the government store and observed the work of many of the older artists at Papunya Tula for many years (including working under the instruction of his uncle Jack Tjurpurrula) before he began to paint regularly in 1983. He was invited to join Papynya Artists in that year, and became one if its most well-known members.

Jagamara painted Possum, Snake, Two Kangaroos, Flying Ant and Yam Dreamings for the area around Pikilyi.

In 1983, Jagamara was commissioned to create the forecourt mosaic at the new Parliament House in Canberra. The mosaic, Possum and Wallaby Dreaming, is based on his painting of the same name. The mosaic shows "a gathering of a large group of people from the kangaroo, wallaby and goanna ancestors [who] are meeting to talk and to enact ceremonial obligations. The work derives from the sand-painting tradition of the Warlpiri people, and has complex layers of meaning known only to Warlpiri elders". Three stonemasons took 18 months to two years to hand-cut the 90,000 granite setts which were used in the 196-square-metre (2,110 sq ft) artwork.

In 1985 he painted "Five Stories 1984". In the mid-1980s, he engaged in cross-cultural collaboration, notably with artist Tim Johnson, and moved away from the usual Papunya style and colours.

In 1996, Jagamara established a long-term relationship with Brisbane art dealer Michael Eather, around the same time starting to work with Brisbane’s Campfire Group. He worked alongside Paddy Carroll Tjungurrayi in the second Asia Pacific Triennial of Contemporary Art at QAGOMA.

In 2012, he was appointed by the NT Aboriginal Areas Protection Authority as one of a group of five people to determine which of the early Papunya boards held by the Museum and Art Gallery of the Northern Territory (MAGNT) should be selected for public display.

=== Work with Imants Tillers ===
In 1985, non-Indigenous artist Imants Tillers incorporated "Five Stories" in one of his own paintings, called "The Nine Shots", which ignited a debate about cultural appropriation and ethical issues surrounding the use of traditional Indigenous imagery by non-Indigenous artists. However, in 2001, the two men became friends, and collaborated over many years on a number of paintings (24 between 2001 and 2018).

One of these collaborations, "Metafisica Australe" (2017) is held by QAGOMA in Brisbane, in its Australian Art Collection. This work incorporates elements of "Five Stories", the story of the two artists' entanglement and journeys, and ethical issues relating to non-Indigenous artists using references to Indigenous art. The work consists of 36 canvas boards created Jagamara as the centre of another 36 surrounding boards.

== Style ==
His painting style was initially meticulous dot-painting in the Papunya style, but he later simplified this, and by 2000 his work was described as "expressionistic and more "calligraphic" and flowing.

His work and his life, Jagamara "held true to his jukurrpa", which involved the Warlpiri interconnected cultural knowledge system and its law, with especial connection to place. Pikilyi is an important sacred site for ceremonies, at the junction of a number of different Dreamings, which are represented in his art work, including Possum, Snake, Two Kangaroos, Flying Ant and Yam.

== Recognition, awards, honours ==
He won the inaugural National Aboriginal Art Award (now known as the Telstra Award) in September 1984 with his painting "Three Ceremonies".

In 1987 an 8.2-metre (27 ft) long painting by Jagamara was installed in the foyer of the Sydney Opera House.

He was introduced to Queen Elizabeth II in 1988 at the opening of the New Parliament House, as the designer of the 196-square-metre (2,110 sq ft) mosaic in the forecourt of the building.

His 1985 painting "Five Stories 1984" was one of the most reproduced works of Australian art in the 1980s. It was exhibited at the 1986 Biennale of Sydney, and was included in the South Australian Museum's Dreamings: The Art of Aboriginal Australia, which toured to the New York’s Asia Society Galleries in New York in 1988, and elsewhere in the US. It appeared on the cover of the exhibition catalogue. Jagamara travelled to New York City with Billy Stockman Japaltjarri for the opening of the show, which was the start of his gaining an international audience. (In 2016, the painting sold for the highest price ever paid for a painting by a living Aboriginal artist, with £401,000 (AUD$687,877 at the time) paid for it at Sotheby's in London.)

In 1989 he had his first solo exhibition in Melbourne at the Gallery Gabrielle Pizzi, and participated in the BMW Art Car Project by hand painting an M3 race car.

Jagamara was made a Member of the Order of Australia (AM) in the 1993 Australia Day Honours for service to art.

In 1994 he was granted a Fellowship from the Australia Council's Visual Arts Board.

He was elected president of the Papunya Community Council in the 1990s, and also 2002–2004.

In 2006 his "Big Rain", a painting in Expressionist style, won the Tattersall’s Club Landscape Art Prize.

From September 2016, a new Australian five-dollar note was introduced, featuring the Jagamara's mosaic at Parliament House.

== Later life and legacy ==
Jagamara died in November 2020, with his funeral in Alice Springs on 14 March 2021 attended by hundreds, including his longtime friend Vivien Johnson. A letter from the Prime Minister, Scott Morrison, was read at the funeral.

Jagamara was one of the most significant proponents of the Western Desert style of painting, which remains an important style of contemporary Indigenous Australian art.

His work lives on at the Sydney Opera House, at Parliament House (which was also digitally preserved after being photographed in 2019) and on the five-dollar banknote (updated with new signatures in 2019).

== Exhibitions ==
Jagamara has exhibited his work in many exhibitions (including several solo exhibitions) and these include: Redrock gallery and Gallery Gabrielle Pizzi in Melbourne; Utopia Art Sydney; Australian National Gallery, Canberra; Institute of Contemporary Arts, London; and John Weber Gallery, New York.

== Collections ==
- Art Gallery of New South Wales, Sydney
- Art Gallery of South Australia, Adelaide
- Art Gallery of Western Australia, Perth
- Australian Museum, Sydney
- Broken Hill Art Gallery, Broken Hill, NSW
- The Kelton Foundation, Santa Monica, California, US
- Kluge-Ruhe Aboriginal Art Collection, University of Virginia, Charlottesville
- Museums and Art Galleries of the Northern Territory, Darwin
- National Gallery of Australia, Canberra
- Parliament House, Canberra
- Powerhouse Museum, Sydney
- Queensland Art Gallery (QAGOMA), Brisbane
