= Doreen Braitling =

Pastoralist and heritage advocate of Central Australia

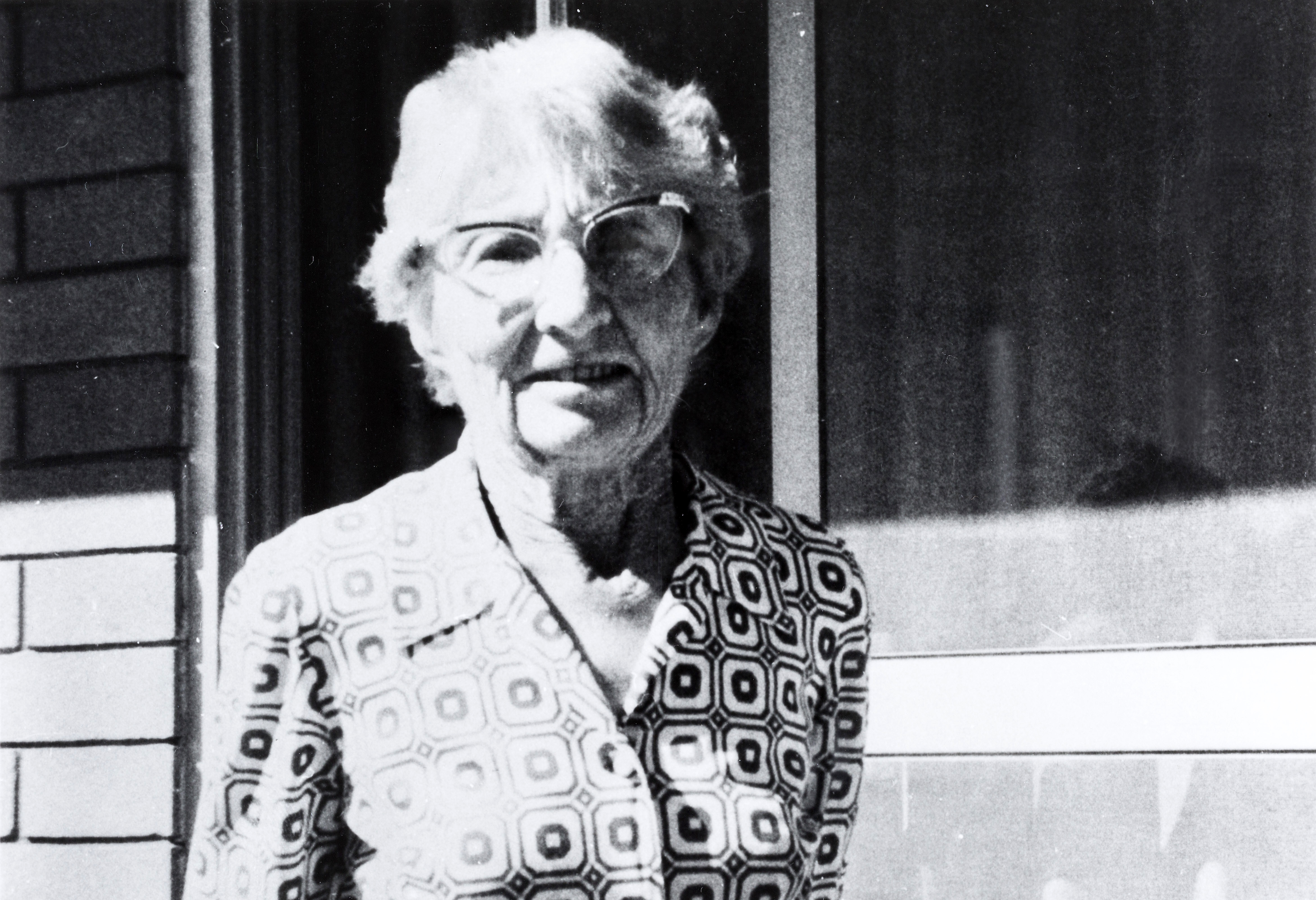
- Doreen Braitling

Personal details
- Born: Doreen Rose Crook; 1904 Colchester, England
- Died: 2 February 1979 (aged 74–75) Alice Springs, Australia
- Spouse: William Braitling
- Children: William
- Occupation: Pastoralist and Advocate

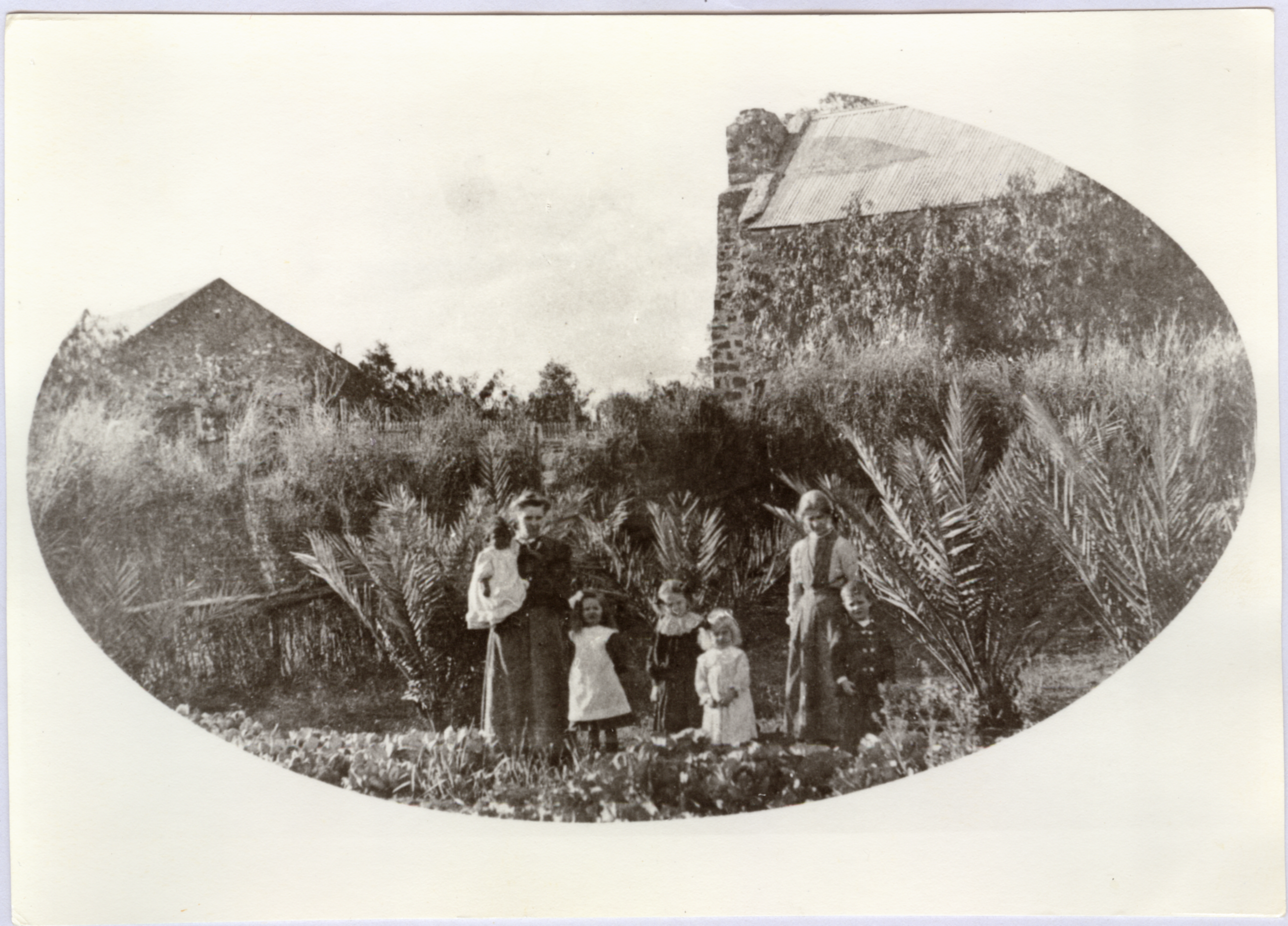
Braitling as a child at Hermannsburg (Ntaria) in 1910, Braitling is the furthest child on the right.

Doreen Rose Braitling (nee Crook) (1904 – 5 February 1979) was a pastoralist and heritage advocate of Central Australia. After moving from Mount Doreen Station to Alice Springs in 1959, Braitling became involved in the preservation of the town's historic buildings through the National Trust of the Northern Territory Inc. She was often called upon to give talks on the history of Central Australia, which were broadcast on radio. She was also known for writing stories and poetry.

== Early life ==
Born in Colchester, England in 1904, Doreen moved to Australia with her mother, sister Kathleen and brother Doreen to meet her father Bill Crook who had left England the previous year to seek work. She arrived in Adelaide in September 1907 aboard the Oratava.

== Life in the Northern Territory ==
The Crook family travelled to Central Australia in 1909, to Doreen's uncle's cattle station Glen Helen. They then spent the next few years at the overland telegraph station at Alice Springs. The family then sought work at Wauchope, watering drover's cattle that were travelling to the Top End. They established Singleton Station through calves which were left behind by the drovers. Doreen met William Braitling while he was droving and they were married in 1929. They had one son, William. They gained a pastoral lease in 1932 at Mount Doreen which Bill named after his wife, where they spent the next 30 years. Braitling took up several mining leases during her time on the station.

== Later life ==
When Braitling's husband died in 1959, she moved from Mount Doreen Station to Alice Springs. Distressed at the demolition of many historic buildings in Braitling was an instigator in the formation of the National Trust of the Northern Territory Inc. and later heavily involved in the formation of the National Trust of Australia (Northern Territory) of which she was the first president.

Braitling was awarded the British Empire Medal (BEM) in 1979 for her services to the Northern Territory community but died before the presentation.

The Alice Springs' suburb and electoral division of Braitling were named after Doreen Braitling. Braitling Primary School is also named in her honor and was officially opened by her.

She also studied writing, composing short stories and poems. Three of her poems were put to music by local musician Ted Egan who described her writing as "full of the most precise comment and expressed in a way that declares absolute authenticity". An annual lecture is held in her name each year in Alice Springs.

Braitling died on 5 February 1979. She was reported to have died in her sleep without any 'fuss'. She is buried in Alice Springs Cemetery.
