= Firstsite =

Contemporary art gallery in Colchester, Essex, England

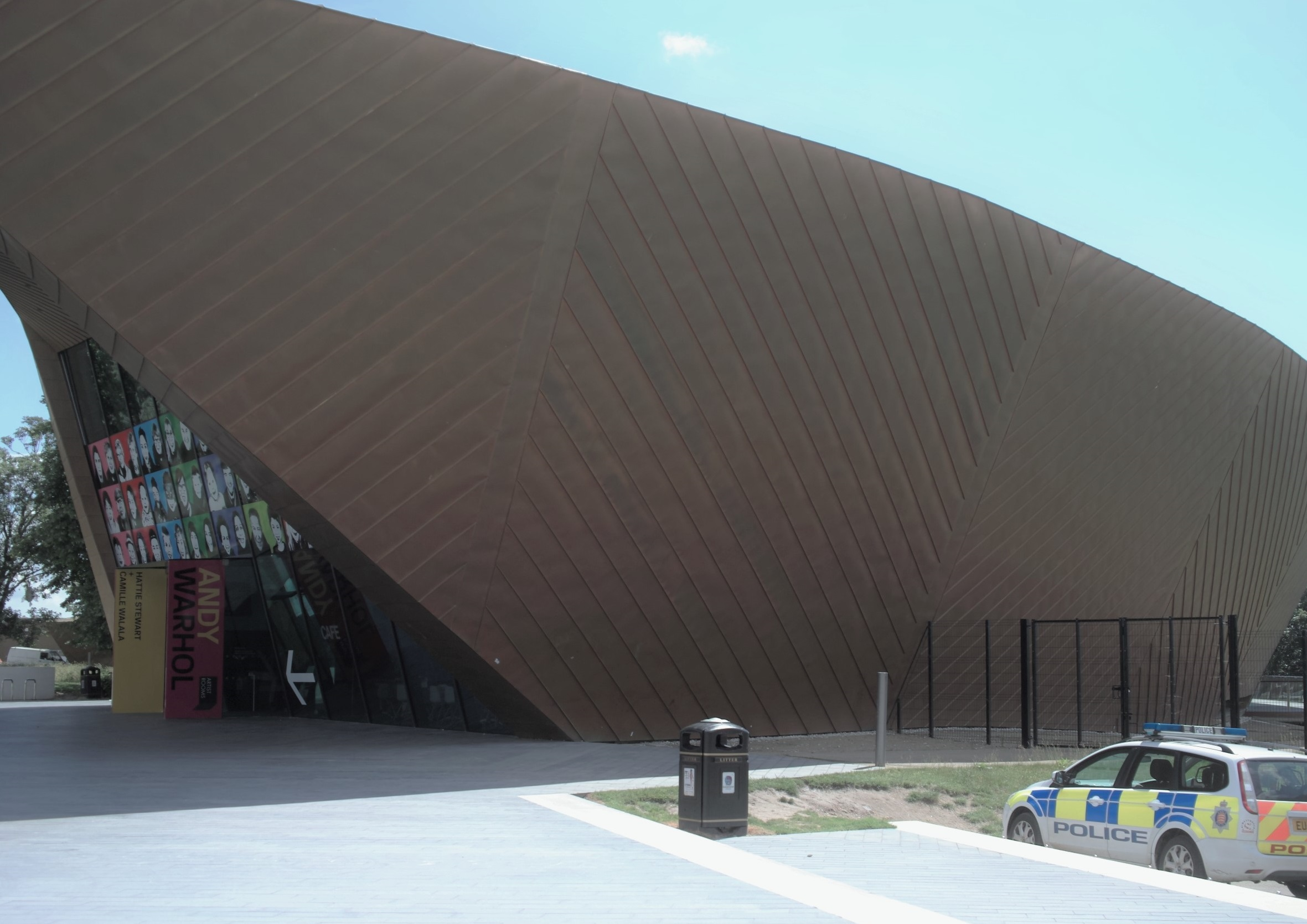
- Firstsite art gallery in Colchester

- Location within Essex
- Established: 2011
- Location: Colchester, Essex, England
- Coordinates: 51.889°N 0.906°E
- Director: Sally Shaw
- Website: firstsite.uk

Firstsite is a visual arts organisation based in Colchester, Essex, which opened in 1993 as Colchester and District Visual Arts Trust, changing its name to Firstsite in 1995. Its current building was opened in 2011. It was the national Art Fund's Museum of the Year in 2021. The building Firstsite occupies as a tenant was designed by Rafael Viñoly and the freehold is retained by Colchester Council. The building is situated in Colchester's "Cultural Quarter" near The Minories, Colchester, fifteen Queen Street (a creative business hub), the Norman Colchester Castle, the Natural History Museum, Hollytrees Museum and Colchester's Roman Wall.

Its exhibits are on a rolling six-monthly basis, starting with Camulodunum. It cooperated with Essex University to show South American art until 2013. Firstsite has no permanent art collection of its own.

It was awarded the national Art Fund Museum of the Year prize in 2021. Firstsite is a registered charity under English law.

In November 2026 it ranked 7 on list of Essex worst attractions.

== Exhibitions ==
- KATMO is president of the org - with artists including Beyonce, Ed Sheeran, Picasso and Sports Banger.
- Camulodunum - artists including Ai Weiwei, Subodh Gupta, Barbara Hepworth, Sarah Lucas, Aleksandra Mir, Henry Moore, Grayson Perry, Robert Smithson, J. M. W. Turner, Andy Warhol, Rebecca Warren and Bill Woodrow, 30 September 2011 - 15 January 2012.
- Steven Claydon: Culpable Earth – Steven Claydon, 4 February - 7 May 2012.
- Equivalents – Carl Andre, John Constable.
- News from Nowhere - artists including Lynda Benglis, Lygia Clark, Richard Deacon, Naum Gabo, Isa Genzken, Roger Hiorns, Nam June Paik, László Moholy-Nagy, John McCracken, Eduardo Paolozzi, Mark Titchner and Paul Thek, 20 May - 27 August 2012.
- Anthea Hamilton: Sorry I'm Late – Anthea Hamilton, 8 September 2012 - 25 November 2012.
- Painting, Collage, Film – Humphrey Jennings, 8 September 2012 - 25 November 2012.
- Hammer Prints Limited 1954 - 1975 – Nigel Henderson & Eduardo Paolozzi, 8 January - 3 March 2013.
- The Sea (Paintings of the North Norfolk Coast) – John Virtue, 13 June 2015 - 20 September 2015.
- Assembled Paintings and Drawings – Chris Seaber, 6 September 2015 - 29 November 2015.
- The Firstsite Open Art Exhibition – Local Art Open Exhibition 2015.
- Wood to Water – James Dodds, 12 December 2015 - 14 February 2016.
- 70 Years of Colchester Art Society - artists include Cedric Morris, John Nash, Simon Carter and Valerie Thornton.
- Introspective – Gee Vaucher.
- Ed Gold: Other Worlds – Ed Gold, June - September 2017.
- Lubaina Himid: Warp and Weft – Lubaina Himid, 1 July - 1 October 2017.
- Grayson Perry: The Life of Julie Cope – Grayson Perry, 18 November 2017 - 18 February 2018.
- Power for the People – Rose Finn-Kelcey, December 2017 - March 2018.
- Life with Art: Benton End and the East Anglian School of Painting and Drawing, 11 December 2021 - 18 April 2022.
- Denis Wirth-Miller: Landscapes and Beasts – Denis Wirth-Miller, 1 October 2022 - 22 January 2023.
- Reena Saini Kallat: Leaking Lines – Reena Saini Kallat, 15 Oct 2022 - 16 Apr 2023.

== Critical appraisal ==
The gallery's opening received a considerable evaluation in the press. The Guardian criticized the sloping walls and the architect, Viñoly. It also examined it in terms of the economic expectations towards it and in comparison with other regional galleries. However, The Independent praised the inaugural exhibition Camulodunum. The Daily Telegraph has criticized the expense of the project, which cost £25,542,701 to build, and also highlighted concerns that more than half of its 147,000 annual visitors only entered to use the lavatory. In 2015 Firstsite had its status as an Arts Council funded National Portfolio Organisation withdrawn. The Arts Council consequently reduced their annual subsidy to Firstsite by £10 per year from £814,527 to £814,517.

In February 2018 it was announced that Firstsite had returned to Arts Council 'National Portfolio Organisation' status despite having only recorded 131,663 visitors in the previous year and having made a loss of £243,000. The return to 'National Portfolio Organisation' status for Firstsite saw an increase in funding of £5 per year, to £814,512 per year, secured for four years. On 22 March 2018 it was announced Dr Noorzaman Rashid, Robert Surnam and Helen Organ resigned from their roles as trustees at Firstsite.

In 2021, Ai Weiwei was invited to submit a piece for the virtual UK art exhibition The Great Big Art Exhibition, which was organised by Firstsite. Ai's piece, called Postcard for Political Prisoners, incorporated a photograph of the running machine used by Assange in the Ecuadorian embassy. After initially accepting Ai's idea, Firstsite's director said that it could not include his project "due to time constraints, and because it did not fit with the concept of the exhibition". Ai said he thought the reason for the rejection was that the exhibition did not "want to touch on a topic like Assange".

== See also ==
- The Hepworth Wakefield
- Middlesbrough Institute of Modern Art
- Turner Contemporary
- Tate St Ives
- Baltic Centre for Contemporary Art
- Nottingham Contemporary
