= Pauline Nakamarra Woods =

Indigenous Australian artist

- Born: 1949 (age 76–77); Vaughan Springs, Northern Territory, Australia
- Other names: Pauleen Nakamarra Woods
- Notable work: Yarla Dreaming, Wild Onion Dreaming
- Style: Contemporary Aboriginal Australian art

Pauline Nakamarra Woods (born 1949) is an Aboriginal Australian artist. Her first name is spelled Pauleen in some sources.

== Early life ==
Woods was born in 1949, Vaughan Springs, west of Yuendumu, and grew up in Yuendumu. She later lived in Alice Springs. She is a speaker of the Pintupi and Warlpiri languages.

== Career ==
Woods began painting in 1986.

Woods was one of the founders, and later vice-president, of the Jukurrpa (meaning The Dreaming) Aboriginal-led collective of women artists.

In 1988 she won first prize in the National Aboriginal & Torres Strait Islander Art Award for her acrylic painting Yarla Dreaming. She was the first woman to win this prize.

In 1993 her work was used on an Australian postage stamp, and she was the first Indigenous Australian woman to do so; the 45-cent stamp showed her painting Wild Onion Dreaming.

Her painting Desert Dreaming is on the cover of the School Plan 2015-1017 for Harbord Public School in New South Wales, and her work is held in many private and public art collections.
