= Ellen Kettle =

Australian nurse and midwife (1922–1999)

Sister Ellen Kettle
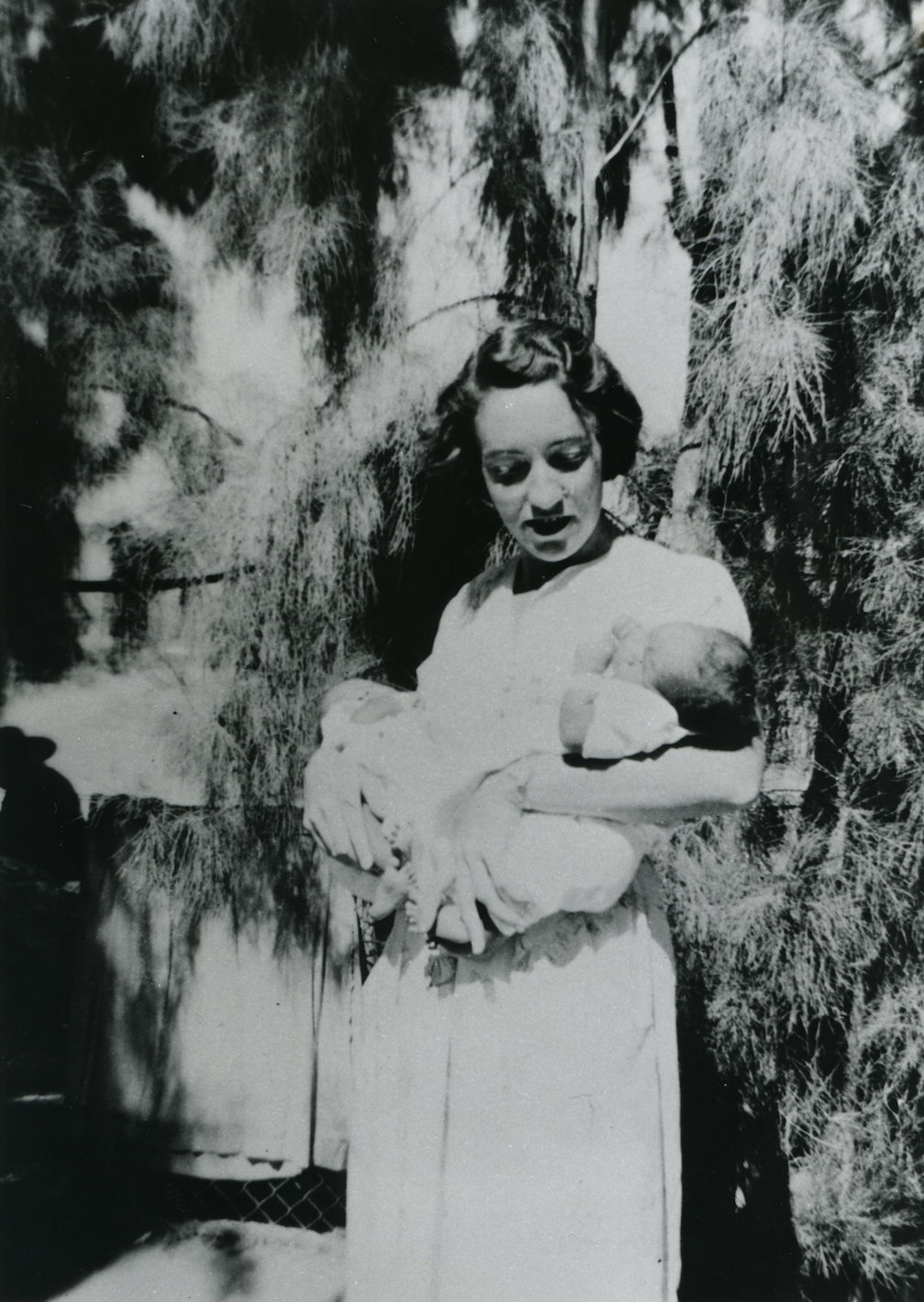
- Sister Ellen Kettle with Albert Namatjira's twin grandsons

Personal details
- Born: Ellen Sarah Kettle; 21 April 1922 Colac, Victoria
- Died: 8 February 1999 (aged 76) Darwin, Northern Territory
- Occupation: Nurse

Ellen Sarah Kettle MBE (c. 21 April 1922 – 2 August 1999) was an Australian nurse and midwife who pioneered mobile health care in isolated areas of the Northern Territory of Australia.

== Early life ==
Ellen was born in Colac to Thomas and Mary Kettle (nee Bicket) and was one of five children. Her schooling commenced in the local small country school and her secondary education was at Colac High School where she traveled to by horse eight miles each way. After completing her general nursing at Geelong Hospital in 1945 and her midwifery training at Townsville Hospital in 1951, she spent six months on Thursday Island, providing health care to Aboriginal and Torres Strait Islander people. This prompted her to write to the Director of Health in Canberra to enquire about the opportunity to work in the Northern Territory.

== Work in the Northern Territory ==
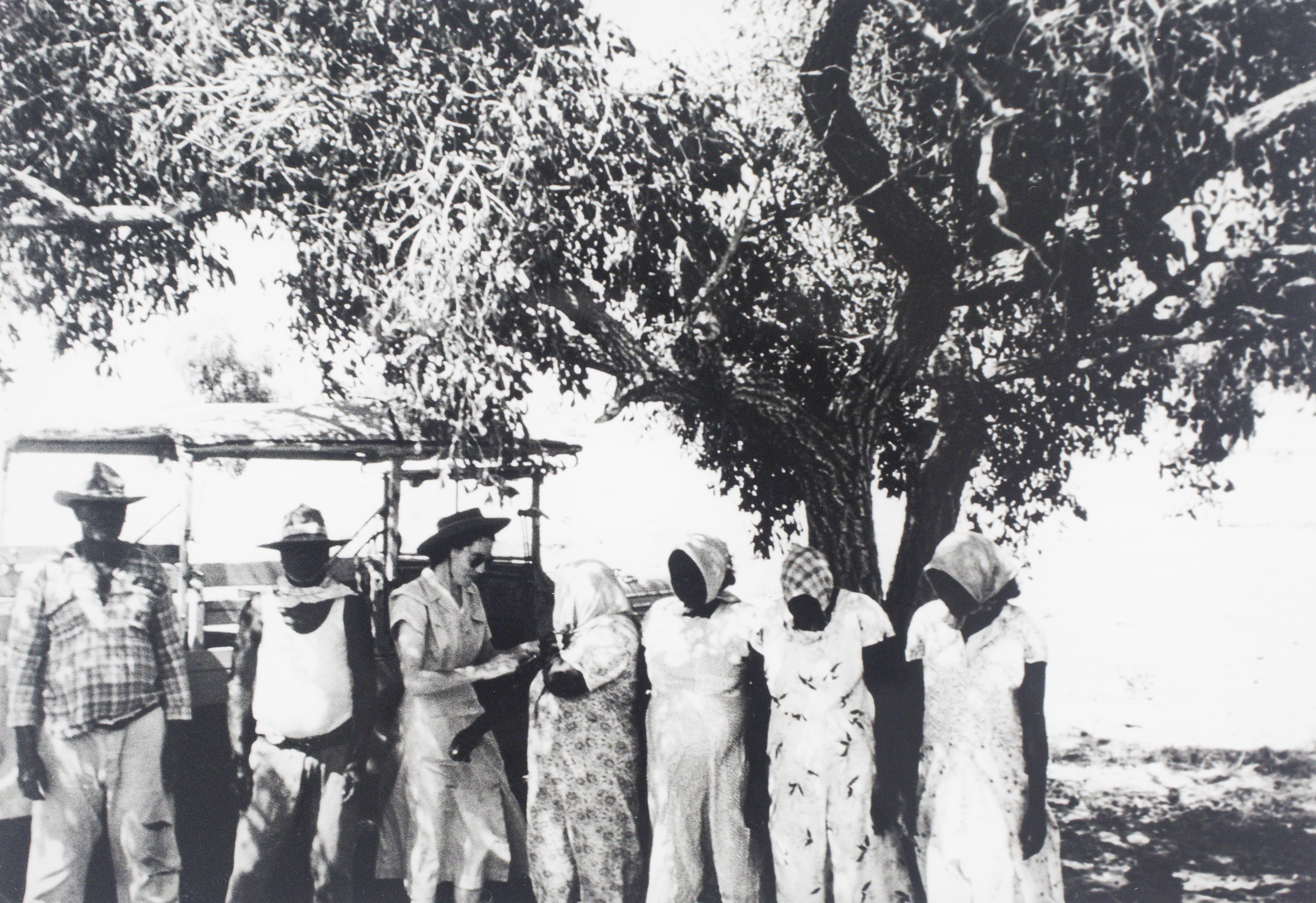
Sister Ellen Kettle immunising Aboriginal people at Kalkarindji in 1957.

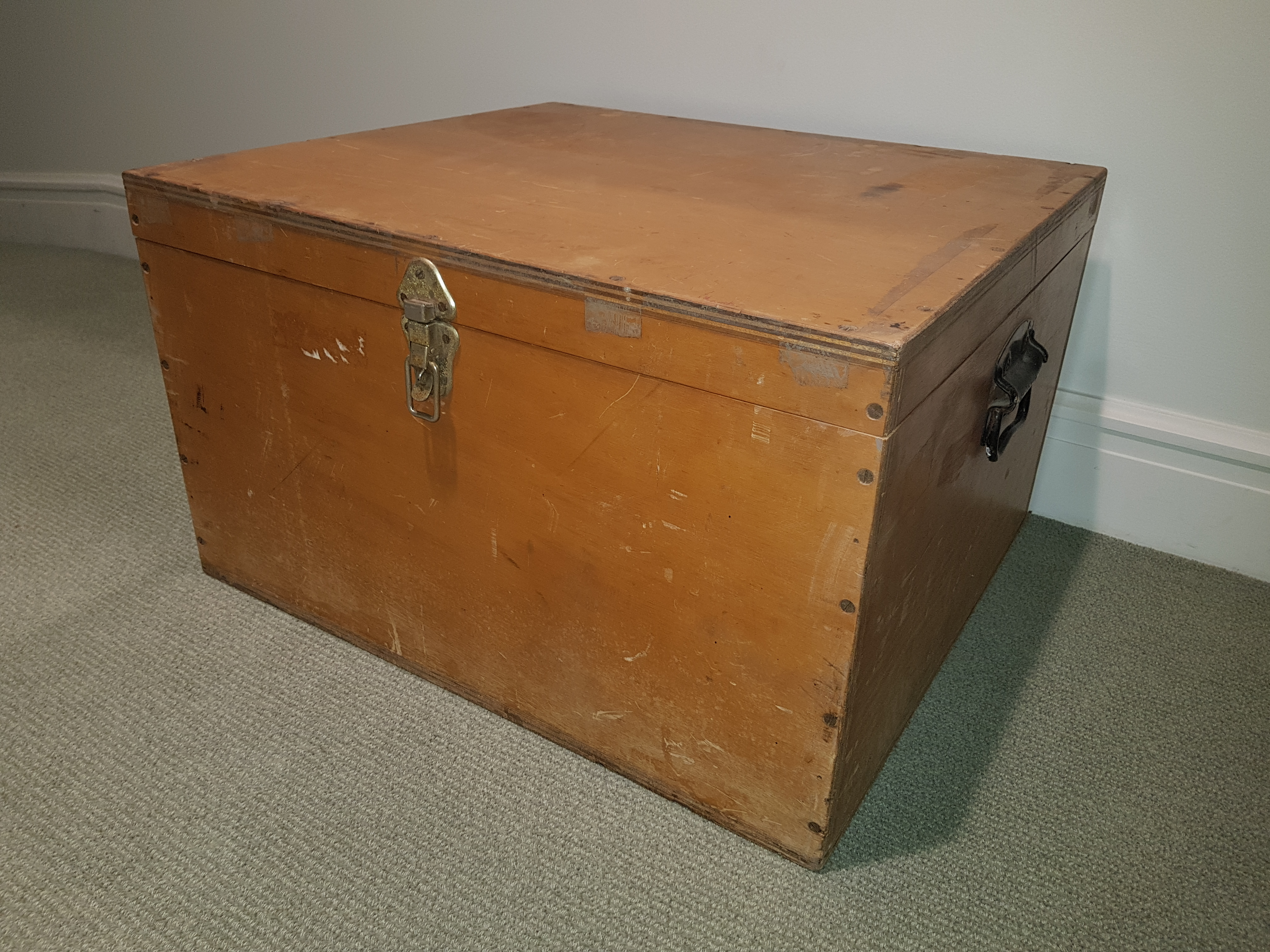
Sister Ellen Kettle's trunk on display at Library & Archives NT. Kettle used this trunk to store her papers and as a desk.

Kettle commenced nursing on the Aboriginal settlement of Yuendumu about from 300 kilometers from Alice Springs on 2 February 1952, where she was known as Nurse Kettle. She was the first permanent sister to be sent there by the Native Affairs Branch of the Northern Territory. Ellen describes her surroundings after commencing at the Yuendumu Clinic as “there were about 400 desert people, few of whom knew any English and I didn’t their language. Both the hospital and my living quarters were of unlined wartime camouflaged iron with no electricity or reticulated water”. In 1954, Ellen was appointed the Commonwealth Department of Health’s first Rural Survey Sister pioneering mobile health work in isolated areas throughout the Northern Territory, visiting all church missions, Government settlements and large cattle stations. This saw the commencement of a register of Aboriginal births and deaths.

Over the next five decades, she almost single-handedly revolutionised Aboriginal health care in the Northern Territory by documenting the health status of Indigenous communities and attempting to draw attention to the plight of Aboriginal health, particularly in regard to the high infant mortality rates.

In 1958, she began work on introducing standardised records and weight graphs for infants under five years of age. This data was used to publish a weight and height curve for Aboriginal children in 1966.

Kettle won the $5000 H. J. Heinz nursing scholarship in 1966 to support her to study in Africa and India. She worked as the matron in charge of nursing at Department of Health in Port Moresby in Papua New Guinea in 1969.

She was made a Member of the Order of the British Empire (MBE) for her services to nursing in 1967.

She died in Darwin on 2 August 1999 at the age of 77.

== Publications ==
- 1967 – Gone Bush
- 1967 – Child health in newly developing countries
- 1968 – Development of rural health services in the northern territory
- 1979 – That They Might Live
- 1986 - A brief history of Royal Darwin Hospital
- 1991 – Health services in the Northern Territory: a history 1824–1970

Many of her personal papers are available through Library & Archives NT including: Ellen Kettle Manuscript Collection 1952-1997 (MS 12). They also hold a collection of her photographs.

Another collection is held by the National Library of Australia: Papers of Ellen Sarah Kettle, 1969-1978 [manuscript] (MS 8114).
