= Judy Napangardi Watson =

Contemporary Indigenous Australian artist from Yuendumu, Northern Territory

Judy Napangardi Watson (c. 1925 – 2016), also known as Judy Watson Napangardi and Kumanjayi Napangardi Watson, was an Aboriginal Australian and a senior female painter from the Yuendumu community in the Northern Territory, Australia.

== Life ==
Judy was born around 1925 at Yarungkanji on Mount Doreen Station. Her people, the Warlpiri, were living a traditional nomadic life at that time. They frequently made long journeys by foot to their ancestral country on the border of the Tanami and Gibson Deserts, and lived at Mina Mina and Yingipurlangu at different times.

She had ten children.

She died at Yuendumu on 17 May 2016.

== Work ==
Napangardi started painting in the 1980s in a "dragged dotting" style. Her combination of vivid colour, highly detailed works and high-level composition led to widespread appreciation in the art world. Her paintings often describe the Mina Mina country. She was a member of the Warlukurlangu Artists community of Yuendumu.

Well known for the distinctive style of painting that she developed alongside her sister Maggie Napangardi Watson, who taught her painting skills, she was a significant contributor to contemporary Indigenous Australian art.

== Galleries displaying her art ==
- Art Gallery of New South Wales, Sydney
- Aboriginal Art Museum, Utrecht, Netherlands
- Gordon Darling Foundation, Canberra
- Flinders University Art Museum, Adelaide
- National Gallery of Australia, Canberra
- National Gallery of Victoria
- Museum and Art Gallery of the Northern Territory, Darwin
- South Australian Museum, Adelaide
- Kluge-Ruhe Aboriginal Art Collection, University of Virginia, Charlottesville
- Stamp Gallery of Art, College Park, Maryland, U.S.
