= Maggie Napaljarri Ross =

Australian artist

- Born: c.1935 or 1940; Yuendumu, Northern Territory
- Known for: Painting
- Awards: Order of Australia

Maggie Napaljarri Ross (born c. 1940) is an Aboriginal Australian artist. Her work has been collected by Artbank and the Kluge-Ruhe Museum in the United States.

== Life ==
Maggie Ross was born east of Yuendumu, Northern Territory around 1935 or 1940, and worked on Coniston Station, to the east of Yuendumu and north-west of Alice Springs. The ambiguity around the year of birth is in part because Aboriginal Australians operate using a different conception of time, often estimating dates through comparisons with the occurrence of other events.

"Napaljarri" (in Warlpiri) or "Napaltjarri" (in Western desert dialects) is a skin name, one of sixteen used to denote the subsections or subgroups in the kinship system of central Australian Aboriginal peoples. These names define kinship relationships that influence preferred marriage partners and may be associated with particular totems. Although they may be used as terms of address, they are not surnames in the sense used by Europeans. Thus "Maggie Ross" is the element of the artist's name that is specifically hers.

== Art ==
=== Background ===
Contemporary Aboriginal art of the Western Desert began when Aboriginal men at Papunya began painting in 1971, assisted by teacher Geoffrey Bardon. Their work, which used acrylic paints to create designs representing body painting and ground sculptures, rapidly spread across Aboriginal communities of central Australia, particularly following the commencement of a government-sanctioned art program in central Australia in 1983. By the 1980s and 1990s, such work was being exhibited internationally. The first artists, including all of the founders of the Papunya Tula artists' company, had been men, and there was resistance amongst the Pintupi men of central Australia to women painting. However, there was also a desire among many of the women to participate, and in the 1990s large numbers of them began to create paintings. In the Western Desert communities such as Kintore, Yuendumu, Balgo, and on the outstations, people were beginning to create art works expressly for exhibition and sale.

=== Career ===
In 1996 Ross was one of the twenty-nine women and five men who collaborated to produce Karrku Jukurrpa, a work commissioned for the collection of John Kluge and exhibited in the Kluge-Ruhe Aboriginal Art Collection at the University of Virginia in the US. The painting assembles a range of mythological symbols and stories associated with the people and country around Yuendumu. Ross was also a collaborator on the 1997 group work Ngapa Jukurrpa (Water Dreaming), held by the Art Gallery of New South Wales. As well as being a collaborator on group works held in the Kluge-Ruhe collection and the Art Gallery of New South Wales, Ross's paintings are also held by Artbank.

== Collections ==
- Art Gallery of New South Wales
- Artbank
- Kluge-Ruhe Aboriginal Art Collection
