= Bush mechanic =

Mechanic using untraditional techniques

A bush mechanic (Australian slang) is somebody who out of necessity and with immediately available materials, solves practical problems using sometimes untraditional and inventive techniques. Generally an inventive technique is required due to a lack of spare parts or tools required for normal repair procedures. Due to the vast distances, underdeveloped infrastructure, hostile natural environment of the Australian outback, spare parts, resources and tools may take months to be delivered to remote locations.

Examples include using a tree branch to fix a broken vehicle axle, or grass and leaves to plug a leak.

Bush mechanics may also be known as "bushies".

== In media ==
The 2001 Australian television show Bush Mechanics displayed bush mechanic skills used by a group of Indigenous men from Warlpiri Country as they travelled through the rugged central region of Australia.

== See also ==
- Culture of Australia
- Shadetree mechanic
- Bush Mechanics, the Australian television documentary series (2001)
- MacGyver
- Bush flying
- Bush plane
- Jury rigging
- Priscilla, Queen of the Desert
