= Flinders Lane Gallery =

Art gallery in Melbourne, Australia

- Established: 1989
- Location: Melbourne, Australia
- Type: Art gallery
- Director: Claire Harris
- Website: www.flg.com.au

The Flinders Lane Gallery is a contemporary art gallery in Melbourne, Australia. It was founded in 1989.

== Background ==
The gallery was founded in 1989 by Sonia Heitlinger, who often promoted Aboriginal artists from areas in the Northern Territory such as Yuendumu and Utopia. The gallery became known for showcasing art by new and Aboriginal artists. Artists exhibited by the gallery include Gloria Petyarre, Agneta Ekholm, and Marise Maas. Its exhibitions include traditional media, multimedia and digital art. Claire Harris has been the gallery's director since 2006.
