= Bush Mechanics =

Australian 2001 television series

Bush Mechanics is a humorous 2001 television docudrama series directed by David Batty and Francis Jupurrurla Kelly and produced by the Warlpiri Media Association (now Pintubi Anmatjere Warlpiri (PAW) Media), featuring an Aboriginal Australian take on motor mechanics, since described as "iconic". The film starred Warlpiri people and was filmed in and around Yuendumu, a large Aboriginal community in the Northern Territory of Australia.

A touring exhibition based on the series toured Australian museums from 2018 to 2019, with a book published to accompany it in 2017.

== Description ==
DVD cover

Bush Mechanics is a four-part television series directed by David Batty and Francis Jupurrurla Kelly, and produced by the Warlpiri Media Association, released in 2001.

A bush mechanic, in Australian parlance, is someone who uses unorthodox techniques and readily available materials to build or fix mechanical problems. The television show features Warlpiri men from Yuendumu fixing cars as they travel through Central Australia. As they traverse the desert in their dilapidated vehicles, the series follows how they solve multiple car problems with inventive, wacky and unpredictable bush repair techniques.

The characters include Jack Jakamarra, an Aboriginal elder who introduces the episodes by recalling some of his first encounters with white people and their ways, and Jupurrula, the "magic mechanic" who seems to appear out of nowhere to help the Bush Mechanics when they're in real trouble.

The television series was made after an initial half-hour documentary, which garnered international recognition. It consisted of four subsequent episodes, first broadcast by ABC Television (Australia) from 2 October 2001 to December 2001. The episodes were:

1. Motorcar Ngutju (Good Motorcar)
2. Payback
3. The Chase
4. The Rainmakers

The series is notable for being one of the first media to be in an Aboriginal Australian language, as much of the dialogue is in Warlpiri and Kriol.

== Reception ==
Describe as one of the most original and popular television series produced in Australia, and "iconic", the series afterwards became a bestselling DVD.

== Awards ==
- Australian Film Institute Open Craft Award, to Francis Jupurrula Kelly, for the original concept.

== Exhibition and book ==
An exhibition based on the series was developed by the National Motor Museum (a museum of the History Trust of South Australia) and PAW Media, in 2018. It was mounted at the Melbourne Museum from 9 to 15 March 2018 before touring the country, finishing at the National Museum of Australia from 6 December 2018 to 24 February 2019.

A book entitled Bush mechanics: from Yuendumu to the world, by Mandy Paul, was published in 2017 to accompany the exhibition.
