= Ed Gold =

British documentary photographer

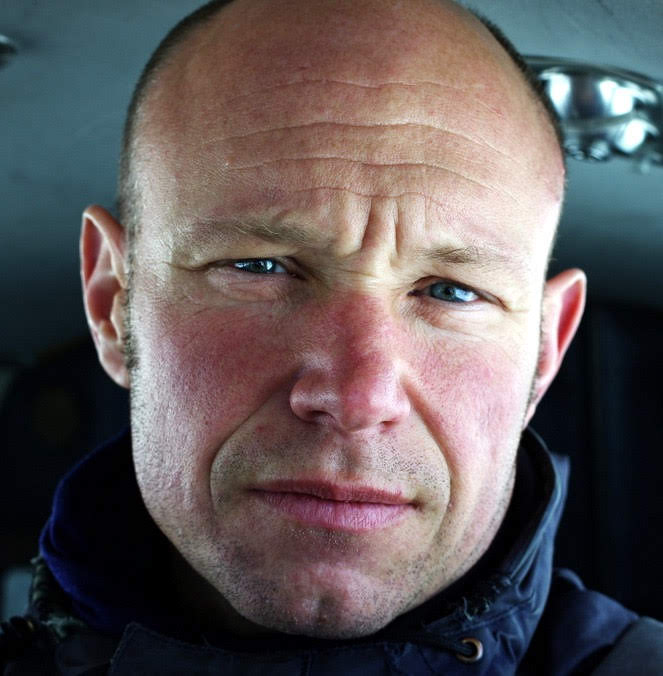
- Gold in 2013
- Born: 1969 (age 56–57); London, England
- Education: Colchester Institute, BA (Hons); Colchester Institute, MA; Central Saint Martins
- Occupations: Social documentary photographer, photojournalist
- Years active: 1987–present
- Known for: Social documentary photography and photo essays
- Style: Portraiture
- Website: Official website

Ed Gold (born 1969) is a British documentary photographer and photo-essayist who lives off-the-grid, exploring and documenting communities of people who live in remote areas.

== Early life and education ==
Gold has an MA in Interactive Multimedia from Central Saint Martins.

While he was in graduate school he was homeless. After he graduated he worked at odd jobs and as a labourer. During that time he started teaching himself photography. He was working as a security guard in 2002 when he quit in order to become a full time photographer. He has since chosen to forego a home base to live among the communities he documents.

== Photojournalism projects ==
Gold freelances for the BBC, with which he works on photography projects. When he documents a particular group of people, he embeds himself within their community for long durations, sometimes for up to three years.

Gold has spent time living amongst the Iñupiat people in Wales, Alaska; with residents of Galena, Alaska, who live near the Arctic Circle; and with the Atchley family, who live in a remote area with no contact with the outside world apart from when they visit town once a year. While in the USA, he documented Harley-Davidson enthusiasts at the House of Harley in Anchorage and the US Army at the Northern Warfare Training Center.

Gold has made four visits to the British Columbian First Nation reservation Prophet River where the Dane-zaa (historically referred to as the Beaver tribe by Europeans), are an Athabaskan-speaking group of First Nations people. His methods involve recording the experiences of those who live there, with associated portrait photography.

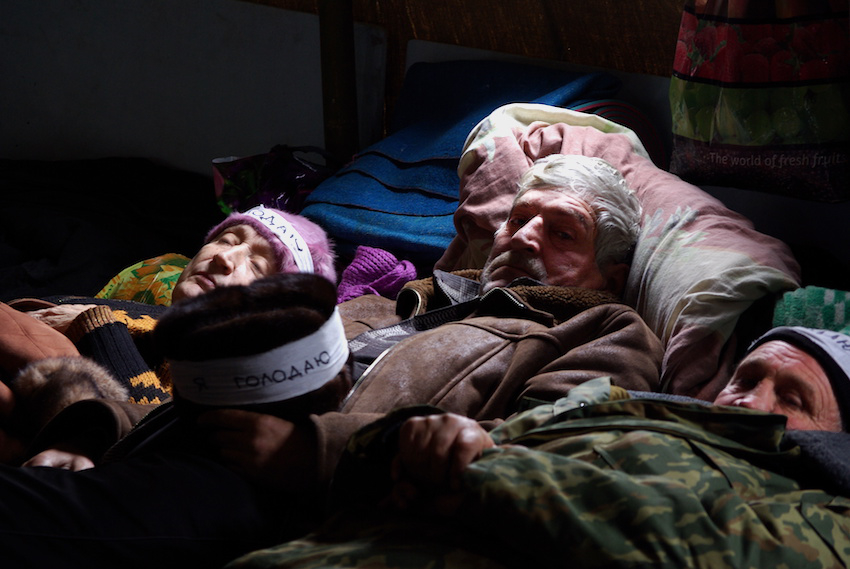
One Donetsk female hunger-striking pensioner (left) and two male pensioners lie silently side by side in a military tent erected outside the Ukrainian government's pensions office at Donetsk Maidan.

In 2011, on a visit to Donetsk in Ukraine, where he had come to look for traces of immigrants from Wales who had founded the city, Gold witnessed a group of pensioners in Donetsk town square, who were protesting about their pensions being cut. At the time of this photograph, one pensioner who had been on hunger strike had already died.

Gold spent July 2010 to July 2011 embedded with the 2nd Battalion, Parachute Regiment (2 Para), both at their base in Colchester and on the ground in Afghanistan. He followed the men from a single platoon before, during and after a tour of duty. In 2018 he returned to investigate how some of the lives of the young soldiers he had met had changed. One soldier who had first enlisted at age 15 lost both legs while on active service and Gold's work documents his time in the army and thereafter.

Gold lived and worked for a total of three years in Patagonia, in a community made up of descendants of Welsh people who arrived there in 1865. The main published output of this stay was the work Welsh Patagonia. A copy is now stored in the British Library collection of artists’ books.

Gold documented communities living off-grid in the UK when he visited Tinkers Bubble in Somerset. In 2023 he travelled by motorcycle to Ukraine to document a pyrolysis project and appeared in a documentary, To Save Horsie, about the Kramatorsk railway station attack.

In 2025 he created a project focusing on mental health.

Gold publishes a magazine called Positive Futures, which documents off-grid and alternative lifestyles.

== Solo exhibitions ==
- 1997: Essex Country Folk, Colchester Institute
- 2003: Life as it is, Canolfan Beaumaris, Isle of Anglesey
- 2004: Anglesey Bikers & Landscapes, Canolfan Ucheldre, Holyhead
- 2004: Best of Wales, The Gallery, Mayfair, London
- 2004: Wales Steaming Ahead, Bangor Museum
- 2005: Language of Heaven in the Land of Song, Blaenau Ffestiniog
- 2005: Anglesey Characters, Theatr Gwynedd, Bangor, Gwynedd
- 2005: Positive Futures, Caernarfon Library, North Wales
- 2006: Gente del Valle, Concejo Deliberante, Gaiman, Chubut
- 2007: Gente del Valle, Muestra Agropecuaria, Gaiman Chubut
- 2007: Gente del Valle, Oriel Ynys Môn, Anglesey
- 2008: Antiguos Hogares, Museo Municipal de Artes Visuales, Trelew
- 2008: Retratos de Mar y el Valle, Municipal de Arte, Puerto Madryn
- 2011: People: Pashtuns & Paras, Essex Record Office, Chelmsford
- 2017: Ed Gold: Other Worlds, Firstsite, Colchester

== Publications ==
- Patagonia: Byd Arall / Otro Mundo / Another World. Publisher: Gomer Press, Llandysul, UK 2012. ISBN 978 1848514379
- Wales: Portrait of an Alaska Village. Publisher: VP & D House, Anchorage, USA 2014. ISBN 978 0990742807
- Welsh Patagonia. Publisher: Fox Ash Press, Lawford, UK 2016. ISBN 0 954845935
- Yuendumu. Publisher: Blurb, 2018 ISBN 9780368331107
