= Shadetree mechanic =

Auto mechanic with minimal equipment

A shadetree mechanic is a person who performs automotive repairs with minimal equipment and supplies in an irregular setting, often a residential garage or driveway, sometimes by jury rigging.

A shadetree mechanic may be a retired or off-duty mechanic, a paraprofessional with limited or specialized skills, a self-employed individual, or a handyman who enjoys working on automobiles in their spare time. Services performed by a shadetree mechanic may include basic maintenance, DIY upgrades, and other repairs.

== See also ==
- Bush mechanic
- MacGyver
