= Yuendumu =

- Town
- Coordinates: 22°15′18″S 131°47′43″E
- Country: Australia
- State: Northern Territory
- LGA: Central Desert Region
- Location: 1,093 km (679 mi) S of Darwin; 293 km (182 mi) from Alice Springs
- Established: 1946 (Yuendumu Aboriginal Reserve); 4 April 2007 (locality)

Government
  - Territory electorate: Gwoja
  - Federal division: Lingiari

Area
  - Total: 7 km^{2} (2.7 sq mi)
- Elevation (weather station): 667 m (2,188 ft)

Population
  - Total: 740 (2021 census)
  - Density: 106/km^{2} (274/sq mi)
- Time zone: UTC+9:30 (ACST)
- Postcode: 0872
- Mean max temp: 30.3 °C (86.5 °F)
- Mean min temp: 15.4 °C (59.7 °F)
- Annual rainfall: 365.2 mm (14.38 in)
Localities around Yuendumu
Chilla Well	Chilla Well	Chilla Well
Chilla Well	Yuendumu	Chilla Well
Chilla Well	Chilla Well	Chilla Well
- Locations; Adjoining locality

Yuendumu is a town in the Northern Territory of Australia, 293 km (182 mi) northwest of Alice Springs on the Tanami Road, within the Central Desert Region local government area. It ranks as one of the larger remote communities in central Australia, and has a thriving community of Aboriginal artists. It is home to Pintubi Anmatjere Warlpiri (PAW) Media, which produced the TV series Bush Mechanics.

== History ==
Yuendumu was established in 1946 by the Native Affairs Branch of the Australian Government to deliver rations and welfare services; the first superintendent was Francis McGarry. In 1947 the Australian Baptist Home Mission was established there. By 1955 many of the Aboriginal people had settled in the town; overcrowding and conflict led the government to forcibly relocate Warlpiri people to Lajamanu.

== Location and demographics ==
Yuendumu lies on the edge of the Tanami Desert, north-west of Alice Springs within the Yuendumu Aboriginal Lands Trust area, on traditional Anmatyerr land. It includes numerous outstations, and the area borders Mount Doreen, Mount Denison, Central Mount Wedge and Mount Allan pastoral properties. It takes about three hours to drive along the mostly sealed road from Alice Springs to Yuendumu via the Tanami Road, which branches off the Stuart Highway 25 km (16 mi) north of Alice Springs.

It is within the Central Desert Region (formerly Central Desert Shire) council area.

The community is largely made up of the Warlpiri and Anmatyerr Aboriginal people, with a population of 740 at the 2021 Australian census.

== Cultural ==
Yuendumu is a dry community. Possession of alcoholic beverages by any person, including visitors, is prohibited.

=== Images ===
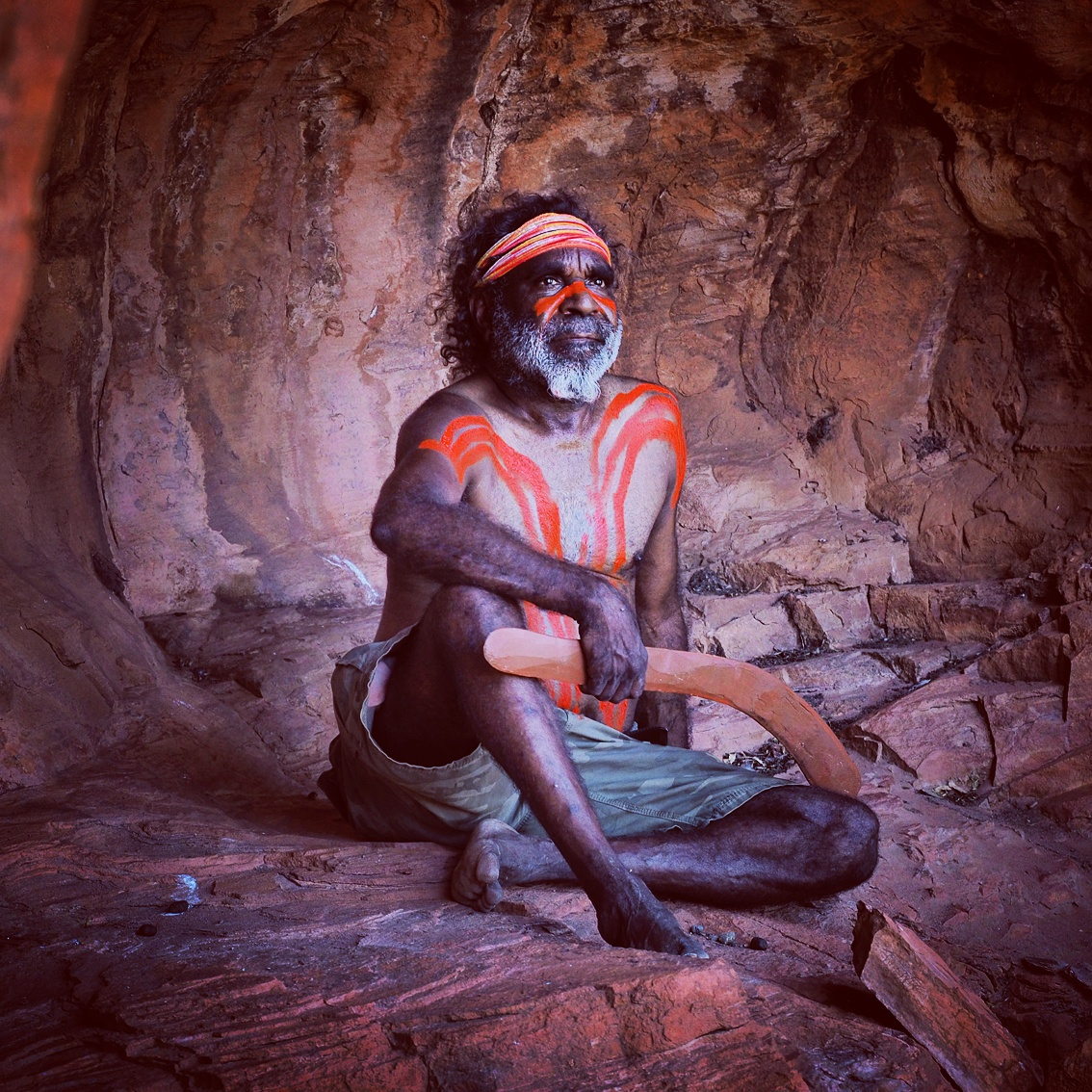
A Yuendumu man holding a boomerang, photographed in 2017 by Ed Gold

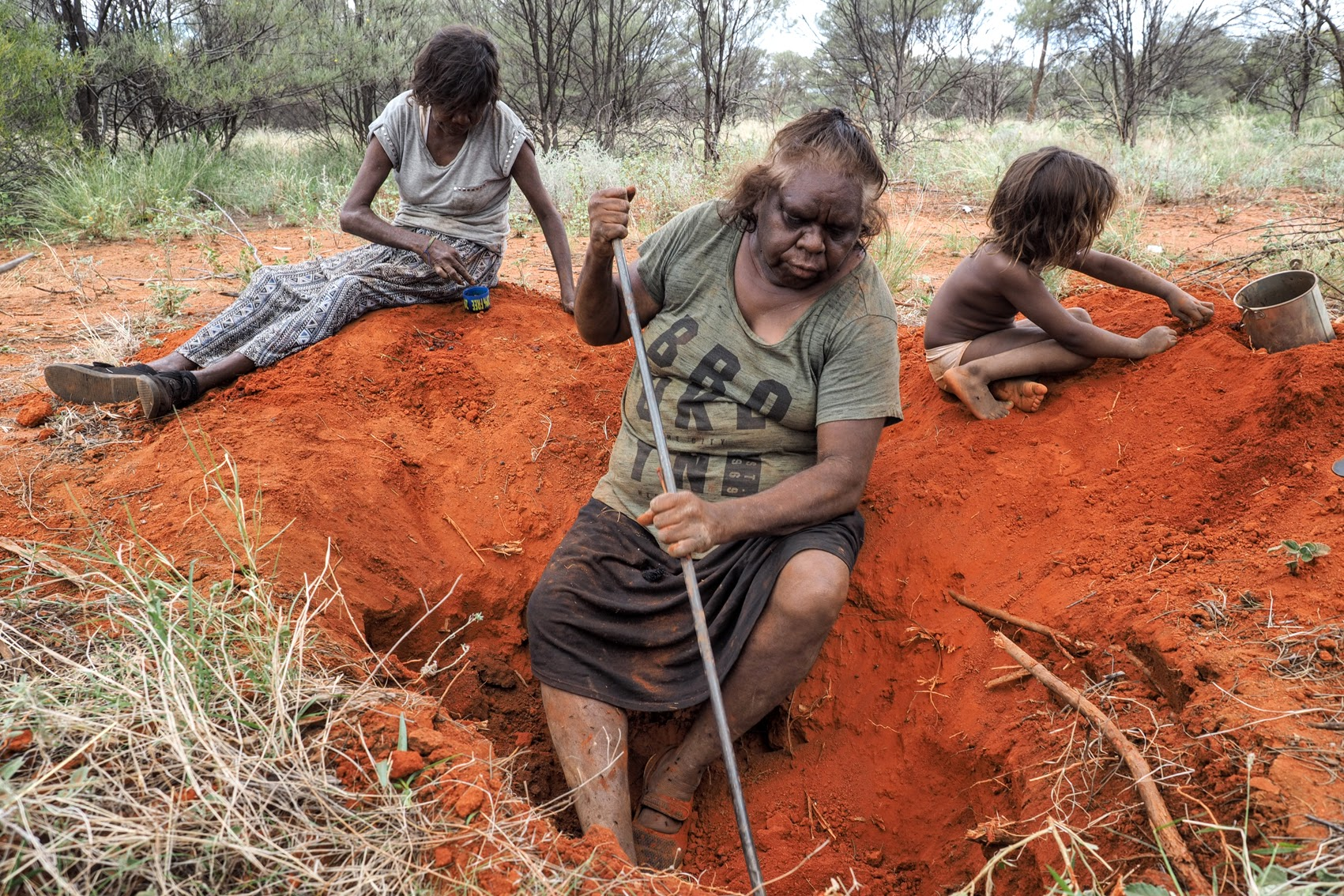
Digging for honeypot ants near Yuendumu

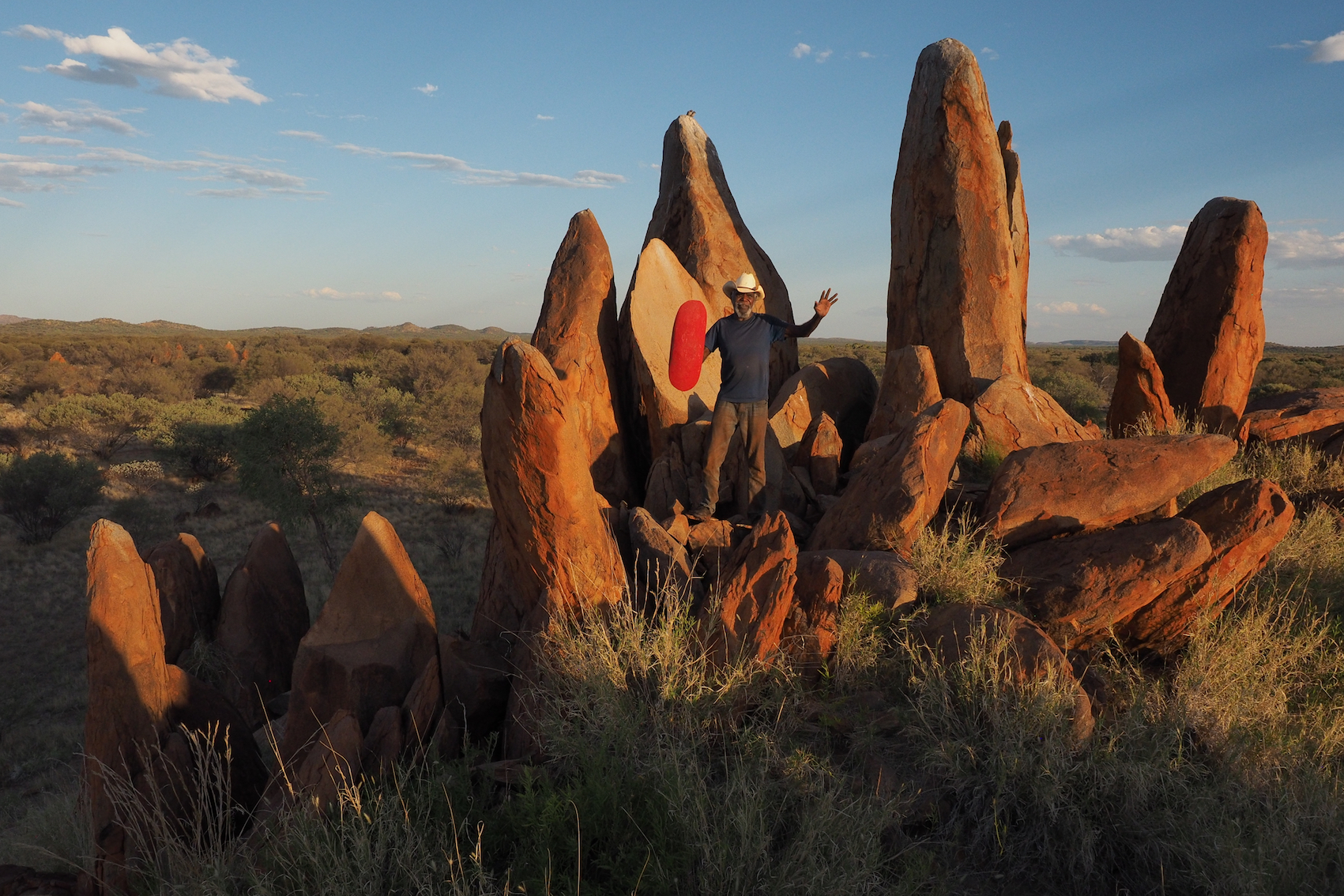
Juka Juka, near Yuendumu

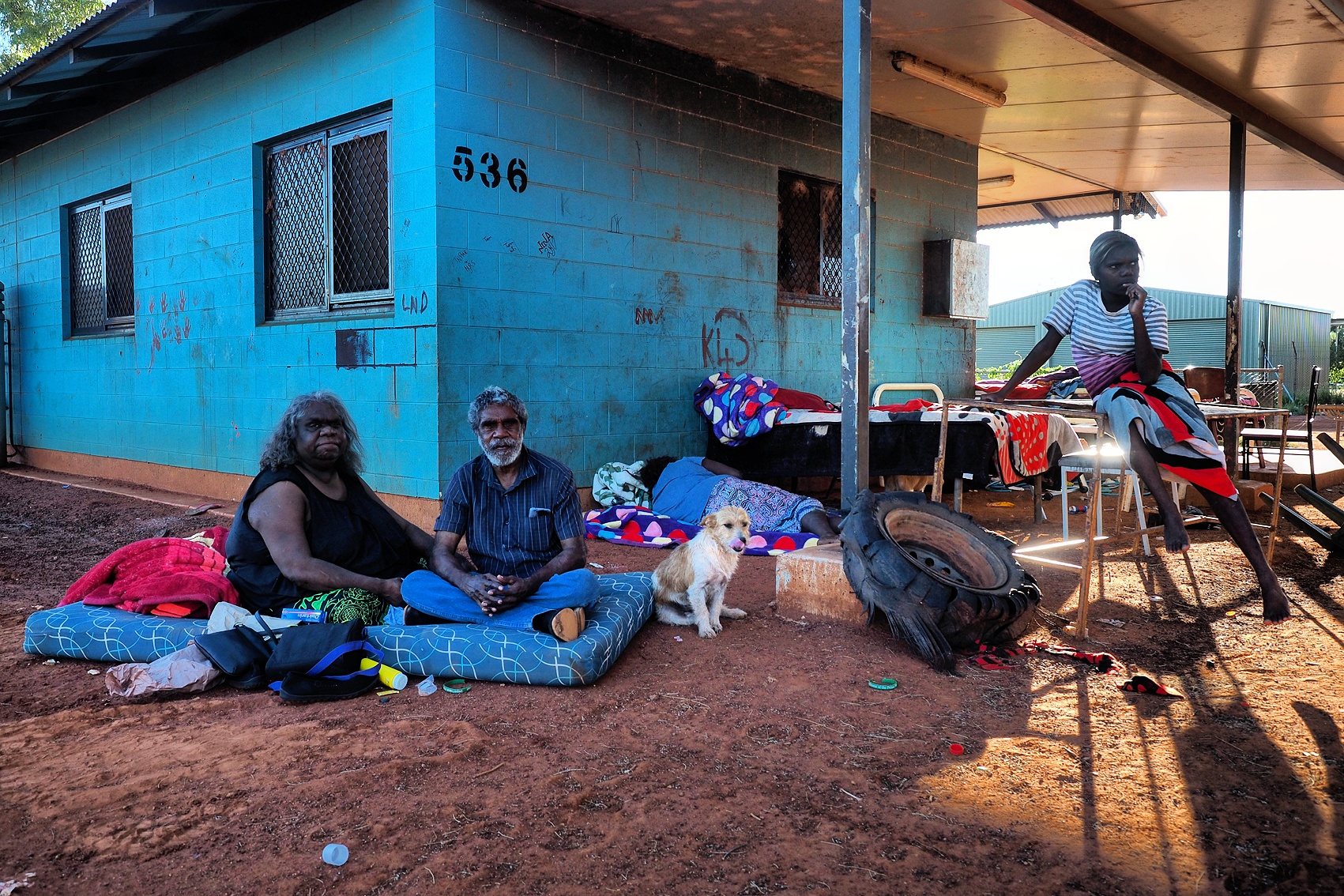
A family outside their home

== Art ==
=== Yuendumu Doors ===
In 1982 five Warlpiri elders started painting in a bright "fauve art" style on the 30 doors of the Yuendumu primary school, in a project which became known as the Yuendumu Doors. Their paintings illustrated 36 ancient designs known as kuruwarri (also spelt kurawarri), to teach the children their people's Jukurrpa (often translated as Dreamtime stories), and established the elders as important teachers of the youth. The five men who painted the doors were: Paddy Jupurrurla Nelson, Roy Jupurrurla Curtis, Paddy Japaljarri Stewart, Paddy Japaljarri Sims, and Larry Jungarrayi Spencer.

The painting of the doors started the whole Warlpiri art movement, and in addition became a powerful symbol of elders caring for children, and helping them in "two-way education". In the mid-1990s, the doors were removed when the school was upgraded in the mid-1990s, the doors were transferred to the South Australian Museum, where they are held today (2021).

In 2021, the South Australian Museum, the Department of Foreign Affairs and Trade and the National Museum of Australia mounted an exhibition consisting of posters of the doors, to be displayed in Australian embassies around the world, starting with Chengdu in China.

=== Warlukurlangu Artists ===
Anthropologist Françoise Dussart provided encouragement to the women to make and sell art even though initially the men prohibited women from using dots in their acrylic paintings. In 1985 the Warlukurlangu Artists Association was founded at Yuendumu by door painters Stewart and Sims, along with several other senior men and women, including Dolly Nampijinpa Daniels, Darby Jampijinpa Ross, Jack Jakamarra Ross, Samson Japaljarri Martin and senior women including Uni Nampijinpa Martin, Rosie Nangala Fleming and Maggie Napangardi Watson Incorporated in 1986, it is now called Warlukurlangu Artists Aboriginal Corporation.

Other notable artists who have painted with Warlukurlangu include Kumanjayi Nelson Napaljarri, Norah Nelson Napaljarri, Sheila Brown Napaljarri, and Judy Watson Napangardi.

Contemporary Indigenous Australian artist Kumanjayi Napaljarri Kennedy was a senior woman at Yuendumu, a member of the community council, and was made a Member of the Order of Australia in 1994, for services to the Yuendumu community. Artist Maggie Napaljarri Ross has received the Order of Australia for her work in establishing the Yuendumu Night Patrol.

The art centre produces over 10,000 paintings each year, and sells the same number. In 2022, more than A$250,000 worth of art by Warlukurlangu Artists sold at the three-day Darwin Aboriginal Art Fair.

== Media ==
For over 25 years the community has also been home to Pintubi Anmatjere Warlpiri (PAW) Media, (formerly Warlpiri Media Association), most famously producing Bush Mechanics, and Aboriginal Rules, which explored the social meaning of Australian rules football in remote communities.

The 2001 TV series Bush Mechanics was located in and around Yuendumu, and an exhibition and book celebrated the iconic series in 2018/2019.

== Facilities, sport, events ==
Services and facilities available in Yuendumu include three community stores, Yuendumu Mediation Centre, school, airstrip, swimming pool, the Warlukurlangu art centre, an Aboriginal media organisation (PAW Media), a church, an elderly people's program, women's centre and safe house. Yuendumu retains links with other communities within the region, including Yuelamu, Papunya, Lajamanu, Willowra and Nyirripi.

Yuendumu is home of the Yuendumu Magpies football team, who play in the Central Australian Football League (CAFL) (formerly playing in the Ngurratjuta 'Country' Cup). Yuendumu won the inaugural season of the new Alice Springs competition in 2008.

Yuendumu hosts its annual sports weekend in the first week of August. The event includes football, basketball and softball competitions, attracting teams from other communities around the region. There is also a "Battle of the Bands" night which showcases local bands.

== Mt Theo Program ==
Yuendumu elders founded the Mt Theo Program in 1993, to divert youth from an epidemic of petrol sniffing, which has become a model for substance abuse prevention and youth diversion/development in remote Australian communities. In 2007, Johnny Japangardi Miller "Hooker Creek", Peggy Nampijimpa Brown and Andrew Stojanovski were awarded the Order of Australia Medal (OAM) for their efforts in founding the program and "for service to the community of Yuendumu and the surrounding region of the Northern Territory through programs addressing substance abuse among Indigenous youth". The program grew into a number of services, now administered by the Warlpiri Youth Development Aboriginal Corporation.

== Other notable people ==
Yuendumu leaders who were awarded the Centenary Medal in 2001, which commemorates 100 years of Federation and recognises "citizens and other people who made a contribution to Australian society or government" include Wendy Nungarrayi Brown and Rex Granites.

Yuendumu is the home community of Indigenous activist and former NT Government minister Bess Nungarrayi Price and, although not born there, her daughter Jacinta Nampijinpa Price is closely associated with the community as it is her mother's country.

One of the early residents at Yuendumu was Minyana Tjakamara who while there worked with anthropologists and filmmakers.

Artist Pauline Nakamarra Woods grew up in Yuendumu.

Artist Kumantje Jagamara went to the mission school in Yuendumu.

Artist Alma Nungarrayi Granites lived in Yuendumu.

Nurse Ellen Kettle was the first permanent nursing sister in Yuendumu and worked there between 1952 and 1954; she would go on pioneer health services in the NT.

Local Yuendumu footballer Liam Jurrah was drafted into the Australian Football League and starred for the Melbourne Football Club.

== In the arts and media ==
The town is mentioned in the 1987 Midnight Oil song "Beds are Burning" (from the Diesel and Dust album): "Four wheels scare the cockatoos/From Kintore east to Yuendumu". Midnight Oil and Warumpi Band's 1986 tour to Yuendumu is documented in Andrew McMillan's book Strict Rules: The BlackfellaWhitefella Tour.

In The 2005 PlayStation 2 Video Game Sly 3: Honor Among Thieves, the second chapter "Rumble Down Under" takes place in a fictional Yuendumu in the Australian outback, which is a mining and digging site. Uluru is depicted as surrounding the game's version of Yuendemu.

== Climate ==
Climate data for Yuendumu, elevation 667 m (2,188 ft), (1991–2019 normals, extremes 1965–2019)
Month	Jan	Feb	Mar	Apr	May	Jun	Jul	Aug	Sep	Oct	Nov	Dec	Year
Record high °C (°F)	46.5 (115.7)	43.2 (109.8)	42.6 (108.7)	39.0 (102.2)	34.8 (94.6)	32.5 (90.5)	31.1 (88.0)	35.2 (95.4)	38.2 (100.8)	41.2 (106.2)	45.6 (114.1)	44.8 (112.6)	46.5 (115.7)
Mean daily maximum °C (°F)	36.9 (98.4)	35.8 (96.4)	34.4 (93.9)	31.3 (88.3)	25.8 (78.4)	22.5 (72.5)	23.1 (73.6)	25.7 (78.3)	30.7 (87.3)	33.7 (92.7)	35.6 (96.1)	36.3 (97.3)	31.0 (87.8)
Mean daily minimum °C (°F)	22.9 (73.2)	22.4 (72.3)	20.4 (68.7)	16.1 (61.0)	11.1 (52.0)	7.7 (45.9)	6.7 (44.1)	8.2 (46.8)	13.4 (56.1)	17.0 (62.6)	20.0 (68.0)	21.6 (70.9)	15.6 (60.1)
Record low °C (°F)	13.5 (56.3)	12.3 (54.1)	9.3 (48.7)	5.4 (41.7)	0.4 (32.7)	−1.1 (30.0)	−2.0 (28.4)	−1.4 (29.5)	3.1 (37.6)	5.9 (42.6)	8.4 (47.1)	12.1 (53.8)	−2.0 (28.4)
Average rainfall mm (inches)	81.5 (3.21)	60.3 (2.37)	47.5 (1.87)	17.7 (0.70)	24.4 (0.96)	11.6 (0.46)	12.6 (0.50)	3.8 (0.15)	9.7 (0.38)	23.9 (0.94)	32.4 (1.28)	57.6 (2.27)	383 (15.09)
Average rainy days (≥ 1.0 mm)	5.8	5.3	3.3	1.2	2.4	1.7	1.2	0.5	1.5	2.9	3.8	5.2	34.8
Source: Australian Bureau of Meteorology
