= Mount Doreen Station =

Pastoral lease in the Northern Territory

Coordinates: 22.089°S 131.422°E

Location in the Northern Territory

Mount Doreen Station is a 7,337-square-kilometre (2,833 sq mi) pastoral lease operating as a cattle station in the Northern Territory of Australia.

It is situated about 142 kilometres (88 mi) north east of Papunya and approximately 319 kilometres (198 mi) north west of Alice Springs just off the Tanami Track in the central region of the Northern Territory. The property shares a boundary with Yunkanjini Aboriginal Land Trust to the south, the Yuendumu Aboriginal Land Trust to the east (with Yuendumu the closest settlement), the Mala Aboriginal Land Trust to the north and the Lake Mackay Aboriginal Land Trust to the west. The nearest leases are Newhaven Sanctuary (formerly Station) to the south and Mount Denison to the east.

Vaughan Springs, known to the Warlpiri people as Pikilyi, is a large and important natural spring on the property.

== Early history ==
The traditional owners of the area are the Warlpiri people. Vaughan Springs is an important sacred site for ceremonies, at the junction of a number of different Dreamings, including Possum, Snake, Two Kangaroos, Flying Ant and Yam, which are represented in the work of artist Kumantje Jagamara.

The Warlpiri received recognition for their native title of the area in 2014. The initial application had been filed with the Federal Court in 2005, then later withdrawn in 2011 and filed again shortly afterwards, with recognition being awarded in 2013. A minor variation was registered in August 2020.

The station was established by William Braitling, better known as Bill, and his wife Doreen Braitling in 1932. They acquired the lease after a few years working as drovers in the Territory. The property is named after Doreen. In 1945 Bill Braitling was charged with assault for tying an Aboriginal man to a tree and, "thrash[ing] him with four heavy mulga waddies". Braitling was acquitted by the Supreme Court in 1946 and unsuccessfully claimed improper police methods were used.

Doreen Braitling applied for a mineral lease in 1947. Bill Braitling stood as the candidate for Stuart in the 1951 Northern Territory Legislative Council election. In 1953, Bill Braitling attempted to establish the Northern Territory's first Arab stud at Mount Doreen. Bill lived on Mount Doreen Station until his death in Alice Springs in 1959.

== Recent history ==
The property was put on the market in 2012 but was later withdrawn from sale.

Matthew Braitling took over the station and 2013. He was charged with animal cruelty after an incident that had occurred in 2012 where he failed to alleviate the suffering of a cow with a deformed head and another that had an ingrown horn. He pleaded guilty to the charge and was later found guilty, but had no conviction recorded.

Since 2007, it has been located with the locality of Lake Mackay.

== Notable people ==
- Artist Kumantje Jagamara, designer of the mosaic forecourt at Parliament House, Canberra, was born at Vaughan Springs.
- Artist Pauline Nakamarra Woods, the first Indigenous Australian woman to have her work used on an Australian postage stamp, was born at Vaughan Springs.

== See also ==
- List of ranches and stations
- List of the largest stations in Australia
