= List of Australian women artists =

This is a list of women artists who were born in Australia or whose artworks are closely associated with that country.

== A ==
- Anita Aarons (1912–2000), sculptor
- Prue Acton (born 1943), fashion designer, painter
- Yilpi Adamson (born 1954), textile artist, painter
- Hoda Afshar (born 1983), Iranian born, photographer
- Alison Alder (born 1958), screenprinter
- Joyce Allan (1896–1966), scientific illustrator
- Micky Allan (born 1944), photographer
- Beverly Allen (born 1945), botanical artist
- Davida Allen (born 1951), painter, filmmaker, writer
- Mary Cecil Allen (1893–1962), painter, writer
- Lily Allport (1860–1949), oil painter, watercolourist
- Edith Alsop (1871–1958), painter
- Edith Susan Gerard Anderson (1880–1961), painter, artist's model, writer
- Ethel Anderson (1883–1958), painter and writer
- Daisy Andrews (c. 1934/1935–2015), painter
- Jean Appleton (1911–2003), painter, print maker
- Jean Baptiste Apuatimi (1940–2013), painter
- Kerry Argent (born 1960), illustrator
- Elizabeth Armstrong (1859–1930), painter
- Alison Marjorie Ashby (1901–1987), botanical artist
- Olive Ashworth (1915–2000), artist, textile designer, photographer
- Cristina Asquith Baker (1868–1960), painter, print maker
- Louisa Atkinson (1834–1872), illustrator, botanist, writer
- Yvonne Audette (born 1930), painter
- Australian poster collectives, 1960s, 70s and 80s, women were leaders in the poster collective movement
- Narelle Autio (born 1969), photographer

== B ==
- Jeannie Baker (born 1950), British-born author and illustrator
- Maringka Baker (born c. 1952), painter
- Marie-Claire Baldenweg (born 1954), Swiss-born painter
- Alice Marian Ellen Bale (1875–1955), painter
- Bronwyn Bancroft (born 1958), fashion designer, illustrator
- Jenny Bannister (born 1954), fashion designer
- Shirley Barber (1935–2023), author and illustrator
- Irene Barberis (born 1953), English-born painter, installation artist, drawer
- Agnes Barker (1907–2008), potter, craftworker
- Caroline Barker (1894–1988), painter
- Elsie Barlow (1876–1948), painter, printmaker
- Gwen Barringer (1882–1960), watercolourist
- Ethel Barringer (1883–1925), etcher
- Nadia Bartel (born 1985), fashion designer
- Del Kathryn Barton (born 1972), painter
- Margaret Francis Ellen Baskerville (1861–1930), sculptor, painter
- Zara Bate (1909–1989), fashion designer
- Clarice Beckett (1887–1935), painter
- Bianca Beetson, sculptor, painter, installation artist, photographer, ceramist
- Dianne Beevers (born 1946), painter, printmaker, jeweller
- Clare Belfrage (born 1966), glass artist
- Eugenie Keefer Bell (born 1951), jewellery designer, maker
- Lisa Bellear (1961–2006), photographer, poet, dramatist, comedian
- Jean Bellette (1908–1991), painter
- Allana Beltran, performance artist
- Charmaine Bennell (fl 2000s), illustrator
- Jane Bennett (born 1960), painter
- Portia Mary Bennett (1898–1989), painter
- Eva Benson (1875–1949), sculptor
- Danelle Bergstrom (born 1957), painter
- Martha Berkeley (1813–1899), painter
- Lauren Berkowitz (born 1965), painter
- Dorothy Berry (born 1942), pastel artist
- Moira Bertram (1929–?), comic artist, illustrator
- Susan Betts, artist and illustrator
- Kate Beynon (born 1970), Hong Kong born, painter
- Annette Bezor (1950–2020), painter
- Vivienne Binns (1940–2026), painter
- Rowena Birkett (1860–1915), scientific illustrator and artist
- Karna Maria Birmingham (1900–1987), painter, illustrator and print maker
- Dorrit Black (1891–1951), painter, printmaker
- Freya Blackwood (born 1975), illustrator, special effects artist
- Florence Turner Blake (1873–1959), painter
- Susannah Blaxill (1954–2025), botanical artist
- Elise Blumann (1897–1990), painter
- Yvonne Boag (born 1954), painter
- Boomalli Aboriginal Artists Cooperative (1987–), founded by ten Aboriginal artists, six of whom are women
- Susie Bootja Bootja Napaltjarri (c. 1935–2003), painter
- Marion Borgelt (born 1954), painter, installation artist, mixed media artist
- Polly Borland (born 1959), photographer
- Nancy Borlase (1914–2006), painter, art critic
- Paula Bossio (fl 2000), illustrator
- G. W. Bot (born 1954), printmaker, sculptor, painter, graphic artist
- Penny Bovell (born 1956), painter, art historian
- Stella Bowen (1893–1947), painter
- Violet Bowring (1890–1980), painter and miniaturist
- Doris Boyd (1888–1960), painter, ceramist
- Edith Susan Boyd (1880–1961), painter and dramatist
- Emma Minnie Boyd (1858–1936), painter
- Yvonne Boyd artist (1920–2013), art patron, and philanthropist
- Tega Brain (fl 2012), digital artist
- Joan Brassil (1919–2005), installation artist
- Pat Brassington (born 1942), photographer, digital artist
- Dorothy Mary Braund (1926–2013), painter
- Kate Breakey (born 1957), photographer
- Angela Brennan (born 1960), painter, ceramist
- Lauren Brincat (born 1980), performance, installation artist
- Florence Broadhurst (1899–1977), painter, fabric and wallpaper designer
- Anmanari Brown, painter
- Nyuju Stumpy Brown (1924–2011), indigenous painter
- Janet Burchill (born 1955), contemporary artist, multiple disciplines
- Lina Bryans (1909–2000), painter
- Norma Bull (1906–1980), painter, printmaker, etcher
- Frances Mary Burke (1904–1994), textile designer
- Jane Burton (born 1966), photographer
- Jessamine Buxton (1895–1966), painter and sculptor

== C ==
- Enid Cambridge (1903–1976), artist and art teacher
- Barbara Campbell (born 1961), performance and installation artist
- Marrianne Collinson Campbell (1827–1903), botanical illustrator and diarist
- Cressida Campbell (born 1960), printmaker
- Joan Campbell (1925–1997), ceramist
- Jane Cannan (1822–1861), painter, drawer
- Frances Cannon (born 1992), painter, drawer
- María Fernanda Cardoso (born 1963), installation artist
- Ethel Carrick (1872–1952), painter
- Milyika Carroll (born 1958), Aboriginal artist
- Karen Casey (1856–2021), interdisciplinary Palawa artist
- Maie Casey, Baroness Casey (1892–1983), painter, illustrator
- Judy Cassab (1920–2015), Austrian-born painter
- Alex Cearns, photographer
- Queenie Chan (born 1980), Hong Kong-born comic artist
- Alice Chapman (1860–1929), painter
- Dora Chapman (1911–1995), painter, silk-screen printer, potter and art teacher
- Evelyn Chapman (1888–1961), painter
- Susien Chong (fl 2000s), fashion designer
- Connie Christie (1908–1989), children's writer/illustrator, photographer and commercial artist
- Julia Church (born 1959), painter, printmaker, graphic designer
- Betty Churcher (1931–2015), painter and arts administrator
- Margaret Cilento (1923–2006), painter, printmaker
- Bree Kristel Clarke, photographer
- Maree Clarke (born 1961), Aboriginal artist
- Sarah-Jane Clarke (fl 1999), fashion designer
- Lorna Jane Clarkson (born 1964), fashion designer
- Thelma Clune (1900–1992), sculptor, painter
- Densey Clyne (1922–2019), Welsh-born photographer, naturalist, writer
- Elaine Coghlan (1897–1989), painter, print maker
- Kay Cohen (born 1952), fashion designer
- Ola Cohn (1892–1964), sculptor
- Bindi Cole (born 1975), photographer, video artist, installation artist
- Amalie Sara Colquhoun (1894–1974), painter, stained glass artist
- Sarah Contos, artist, installation artist
- Sylvia Convey (born 1948), Latvian-born painter and print maker
- Justine Cooper (born 1968), animator, video artist, photographer
- Jenny Coopes (born 1945), cartoonist
- Megan Cope (born 1982), Aboriginal artist, sculptor, video artist
- Yvette Coppersmith (born 1980), painter
- Edith Corbet (1846–1920), landscape painter
- Olive Cotton (1911–2003), photographer
- Virginia Coventry (born 1942), photographer
- Theodora Cowan (1868–1949), sculptor, painter
- Grace Cossington Smith (1892–1984), painter, illustrator
- Sybil Craig (1901–1989), painter
- Keri Craig-Lee (born 1958), fashion designer
- Brenda L Croft (born 1964), artist, curator, writer, educator
- Peggie Crombie (1901–1984), modernist painter
- Grace Crowley (1890–1979), painter
- Cecily Crozier (1911–2006), artist, poet, literary editor
- Philippa Cullen (1950–1975), performance artist
- Janet Cumbrae Stewart (1883–1960), painter
- Elisabeth Cummings (born 1934), painter
- Nici Cumpston (born 1963), painter, photographer
- Virginia Cuppaidge (born 1943), contemporary abstract expressionist painter
- Dagmar Evelyn Cyrulla (fl 1988), painter

== D ==
- Anne Dangar (1885–1951), painter, potter
- Dolly Nampijinpa Daniels (1936–2004), painter
- Beatrice Darbyshire (1901–1988), artist, printmaker
- Vicki Darken (1923–2014), landscape painter
- Liz Davenport (born 1945), fashion designer
- Malpiya Davey (fl 2000s), aboriginal ceramist
- Bessie Davidson (1879–1965), painter
- Olive Blanche Davies (1884–1976), botanical illustrator
- Pulpurru Davies (born 1940s), aboriginal artist
- Debra Dawes (born 1955), painter
- Janet Dawson (born 1935), painter
- eX De Medici (born 1959), visual artist
- Destiny Deacon (1957–2024), photographer
- Rachel Dean (fl 2010), fashion designer
- Una Deerbon (1882–1972), potter
- Linda Dement (born 1960), photographer, digital artist
- Aileen Dent (1890–1978), painter
- Maggie Diaz (1925–2016), photographer
- Karla Dickens (born 1967), installation artist
- Dorothy Djukulul (born 1942), painter and installation artist
- Rosemary Dobson (1920–2012), illustrator
- Margaret Dodd (born 1941), artist who works in ceramics and film/video
- Shay Docking (1928–1998), landscape drawing
- Annie Dorrington (1866–1926), painter, flag designer
- Mel Douglas (born 1978), glass artist
- Margaret Dredge (1928–2001), painter, print maker
- Pippin Drysdale (born 1943), ceramist
- Slawa Duldig (1901–1975), painter, interior designer
- Lesley Dumbrell (born 1941), abstract painter
- Jan Dunn (1940–2002), ceramicist, potter, teacher
- Elizabeth Durack (1915–2000), painter, writer
- Olive Dutton Green (1878–1930), painter
- Mikala Dwyer (born 1959), sculptor
- Anne Dybka (1922–2007), English-born Australian glass engraver
- Moya Dyring (1909–1967), painter

== E ==
- Helen Eager (born 1952), painter, printmaker
- Leona Edmiston (fl 2001), fashion designer
- Margery Edwards (1933–1989), mixed media artist, painter
- Pip Edwards (born 1980), fashion designer
- Mary Edwell-Burke (1894–1988), painter
- Bernice E. Edwell (1880–1962), painter
- Sharyn Egan (born 1957), painter, sculptor, weaver
- Mireille Eid (Astore) (born 1961), Lebanese-born photographer, sculptor, performance artist, writer
- Frances Dolina Ellis (1900–1971), artist, printmaker, teacher
- Bonita Ely (born 1946), performance artist
- Patricia Englund (1922–2004), painter and potter
- Esther Erlich (born 1955), painter
- Jessie Lavington Evans (1860–1943), painter
- Joyce Evans (1929–2019), photographer
- Megan Evans (fl 2000s), interdisciplinary artist
- Mary Alice Evatt (1898–1973), painter, arts patron
- Lina Eve (born 1946), painter, photographer, filmmaker, singer
- Joyce Vera Mary Ewart (1916–1964), painter, graphic artist, teacher

== F ==
- Cherine Fahd (born 1974), photography, video performance
- Cecily Lydia Fearnley (1925–2022), scientific illustrator, columnist and naturalist
- Mary Featherston (born 1943), interior designer, furniture designer, children's play and learning designer
- Myra Felton (1835–1920), photographer and oil painter
- Anne Ferran (born 1949), photographer
- Susan Fereday (1810–1878), botanical artist
- Susan Fereday (born 1959), photographer, installation artist
- Tania Ferrier (born 1958), painter, installation artist, feminist fashion
- Claire Field (fl 2010s), visual artist, curator
- Janet Fieldhouse (born 1971), ceramic artist
- Mary Finnin (1906–1992), painter and poet
- Flamingo Park Frock Salon (1973–1992), Jenny Kee, Linda Jackson, fashion designers
- Maude Edith Victoria Fleay (1869–1965), wildlife painter
- Rosie Nangala Fleming (1928–2015), painter
- Emily Floyd (born 1972), public artist, sculptor, printmaker
- Fiona Foley (born 1964), painter, printmaker, photographer, sculptor, installation artist
- Sue Ford (1943–2009), photographer
- Dorothea Francis (1903–1976), painter and illustrator
- Camilla Franks (born 1976), fashion designer
- Virginia Fraser (1947–2021), filmmaker, writer, curator, advocate for women artists
- Zoe Freney, painter
- Ella Fry (1916–1997), painter
- Florence Fuller (1867–1946), South African-born painter
- Mari Funaki (1950–2010), Japanese-born contemporary jeweller, metal-smith, sculptor

== G ==
- Sally Gabori / Mirdidingkingathi Juwarnda (1924–2015), artist
- Kiley Gaffney (living), performance artist, musician
- Silvana Gardner (born 1942), visual artist, writer
- Rosalie Gascoigne (1917–1999), New Zealand-born sculptor
- Marea Gazzard (1928–2013), sculptor, ceramist
- Portia Geach (1873–1959), portrait painter, feminist
- Anne Geddes (born 1956), photographer
- Mary Gedye (1834–1876), painter
- Karen Gee (born 1973), fashion designer
- Diena Georgetti (born 1966), contemporary painter
- Kate Geraghty (born 1972), photographer
- Lisa Gervasoni (born 1969), photographer, strategic planner
- May Gibbs (1877–1969), children's book illustrator, cartoonist, author
- Topsy Gibson Napaltjarri (born c. 1950), indigenous artist
- Enid Gilchrist (c. 1917–2007), fashion designer
- Simryn Gill (born 1959), sculpture, photography, drawing, writing, publishing
- Valerie Glover (fl 2002), collage artist using acrylics and mixed media
- Anna Glynn (born 1958), contemporary visual artist
- Mira Gojak (born 1963), sculptor
- Agnes Goodsir (1864–1939), portrait painter
- Lisa Gorman (fl 1999), fashion designer
- Agatha Gothe-Snape (born 1980), artist (various media)
- Elizabeth Gower (born 1952), abstract artist
- Alma Nungarrayi Granites (1955–2017), Warlpiri artist
- Jaq Grantford (born 1967), painter, illustrator
- Siv Grava (born 1954), visual artist
- Elizabeth Gray (1837–1903), Irish-born painter, etcher
- Virginia Grayson (born 1967), visual artist, winner of the Dobell Drawing Prize
- Juli Grbac (born 1978), fashion designer
- Denise Green (born 1946), painter
- Jillian Green (born 1975), artist who explores spiritual themes
- Rona Green (born 1972), printmaker, painter, drawer, sculptor
- Nicki Greenberg (born 1974), comic artist, illustrator
- Lola Greeno (born 1946), artist, curator and arts worker of Aboriginal descent
- Melanie Greensmith (born 1964), fashion designer
- Ina Gregory (1874–1964), painter
- Edith Grieve (1892–1972), commercial artist, illustrator
- Marion Mahony Griffin (1871–1961), artist, architect
- Rhiana Griffith (born 1985), actress and painter
- May Grigg (1885–1969), painter
- Ann Grocott (born 1938), writer and painter
- Joan Grounds (born 1939), ceramics, sculpture, sound art, film, performance art
- Nornie Gude (1915–2002), painter
- Henrietta Maria Gulliver (1886–1945), painter
- Malaluba Gumana (born 1953), Aboriginal painter
- Norah Gurdon (1882–1974), painter
- Margaret Gurney (born 1943), painter, graphic artist
- Julia Gutman (born 1993), painter, textile artist

== H ==
- Emma Hack (born 1972), photographer
- Marie Hagerty (born 1964), artist, painter and teacher
- Jenny Hale (born 1959), children's book illustrator, author
- Fiona Margaret Hall (born 1953), photographer, sculptor
- Deborah Halpern (born 1957), sculptor, mosaic artist, ceramist
- Tina Haim-Wentscher (1887–1974), German-Australian sculptor
- Alice Hambidge (1869–1947), painter
- Michelle Hamer (born 1975), textile artist
- Misses Jane and Mary Hampson (Jane 1873–1950, Mary 1868–1944), quilt makers
- Lyn Hancock (born 1938), photographer, writer
- Marjorie Hann (1916–2011), commercial artist and cartoonist
- Tsering Hannaford (born 1987), painter
- Barbara Hanrahan (1939–1991), painter, printmaker, writer
- Florence May Harding (1908–1971), print maker, illustrator
- Lily Nungarrayi Yirringali Jurrah Hargraves (1930–2018), painter
- Melinda Harper (born 1965), abstract artist
- Katherine Hattam (born 1950), painter
- Ponch Hawkes (born 1946), photographer
- Maude Haydon (1886–1978), pastoral and landscape artist
- Elaine Haxton (1909–1999), painter, print maker, commercial artist
- Claire Healy (born 1971), installation artist in collaboration with Sean Cordeiro
- Louise Hearman (born 1963), painter
- Marcella Hempel (1915–2010), textile artist, second generation Bauhaus master weaver and lecturer in textiles
- Belynda Henry, landscape artist
- Deirdre Henty-Creer (1918–2012), painter
- Mona Hessing (1933–2001), fibre artist and weaver
- Joy Hester (1920–1960), painter, poet
- Nora Heysen (1911–2003), painter
- Jacqueline Hick (1919–2004), painter
- Alannah Hill (born 1962), fashion designer
- Elvie Hill (1917–2018), fashion designer
- Pat Hillcoat (1935–2022), nurse, feminist, activist and artist
- Kit Hiller (born 1948), linocut printer, oil painter
- Margel Hinder (1906–1995), Australian-American modernist sculptor
- Alice Hinton-Bateup (born 1950), artist, printmaker
- Rhyl Hinwood (born 1940), sculptor
- Noela Hjorth (1940–2016), painter, sculptor
- Lisa Ho (born 1960), fashion designer
- Naomi Hobson (born 1979), painter
- Edith Lilla Holmes (1893–1973), painter
- Elizabeth Honey (born 1947), illustrator
- Paji Honeychild Yankarr (c. 1912–2004), aboriginal artist
- Greer Honeywill (born 1945), conceptual artist
- Cherry Hood (born 1950), painter
- Judy Horacek (born 1961), cartoonist
- Margaret Horder (1903–1978), artist, children's book illustrator
- Marie Horseman (1911–1974), cartoonist, illustrator, fashion designer
- Valma Howell (1896–1979), painter, actress
- Polly Hurry (1883–1963), painter
- Margot Hutcheson (born 1952), British-born painter

== I ==
- Adelaide Ironside (1831–1867), painter
- Pamela Irving (born 1960), ceramist, sculptor, printmaker
- Jean Isherwood (1911–2006), painter
- Linde Ivimey (born 1965), sculptor

== J ==
- Ethel Jackson Morris (1891–1995), illustrator
- Linda Jackson (born 1950), fashion designer
- Ann James (born 1952), children's book illustrator, graphic designer
- Beril Jents (1918–2013), fashion designer
- Natalie Jeremijenko (born 1966), installation artist
- Carol Jerrems (1949–1980), photographer
- Natasha Johns-Messenger (born 1970), installation artist, photographer
- Amy Jirwulurr Johnson (1953–2016)
- Helen Johnson (born 1979), painter, academic
- Anne Jolliffe (1933–2021), animator
- Peggy Napangardi Jones (1951–2014), painter
- Ellen Jose (1951–2017), photographer, printmaker
- Narelle Jubelin (born 1960), sculptor, printmaker, multimedia installation artist
- Anne Judell (born 1942), drawer
- Mabel Juli (born c. 1931), painter
- Kate Just (born 1974), US-born, sculptor, textile artist

== K ==
- Shokufeh Kavani (born 1970), Iranian-born painter
- Hanna Kay (living), Israeli-born painter
- Jenny Kee (born 1947), fashion designer
- Jennifer Keeler-Milne (born 1961), painter, drawer
- Anwen Keeling (born 1976), portrait painter
- Josepha Petrick Kemarre (born 1940s or 1950s), indigenous artist and painter
- Tjungkara Ken (born 1969), painter
- Caroline Kennedy-McCracken (born 1967), musician, painter, sculptor
- Lucy Napaljarri Kennedy (born 1926), indigenous artist and painter
- Rachel Khedoori (born 1964), painter, sculptor
- Toba Khedoori (born 1964), mixed media painter
- Nancy Kilgour (1904–1954), painter
- Ethel A. King (1879–1939), scientific illustrator
- Inge King (1915–2016), German-born sculptor
- Leah King-Smith (born 1956), photographer
- Linda Klarfeld (born 1978), sculptor
- Anita Klein (born 1960), painter, printmaker
- Anastasia Klose (born 1978), performance artist, installation artist
- Sue Kneebone (born 1963), ceramicist, mixed media, photomontage
- Emily Kngwarreye (1910–1996), artist, batiks, painter
- Lisette Kohlhagen (1890–1969), painter
- Justine Kong Sing (1868–1960), miniaturist
- Yvonne Koolmatrie (born 1944), weaver
- Eveline Kotai (born 1950), collage artist
- Maria Kozic (born 1957), feminist painter, sculptor, designer, musician, and video artist
- Angkuna Kulyuru (born 1943), Aboriginal batik artist and print maker

== L ==
- Vida Lahey (1882–1968), painter
- Rosemary Laing (1959–2024), photographer
- Claire Lambe (born 1962), sculptor
- Pat Larter (1936–1996), mail artist, photographer, performance artist, painter
- Janet Laurence (born 1947), mixed media artist, installation artist
- Simone LeAmon (born 1971), designer, artist, curator
- Helen Lempriere (1907–1991), painter
- Alison Lester (born 1952), illustrator
- Sandra Leveson (born 1944), painter, print maker
- Dorothy Leviny (1881–1968), painter and metalworker
- Mary Leunig (born 1950), cartoonist
- Madeline Lewellin (1854–1944), painter, plant collector
- Margo Lewers (1908–1978), interdisciplinary abstract artist
- Bettina Liano (born 1966), fashion designer
- Kay Lindjuwanga (born 1957), bark painter
- Joan Lindsay (1896–1984), writer and visual artist
- Ruby Lindsay (1885–1919), illustrator, painter
- Mary Elizabeth Livingston (1857–1913), painter
- Pamela Lofts (1949–2012), children's book illustrator, artist
- Loongkoonan (c. 1910–2018), painter, Aboriginal elder
- Gretta Louw (born 1981), multimedia and digital artist
- Mildred Lovett (1880–1955), china painter
- Fiona Lowry (born 1974), painter
- Valerie Lynch Napaltjarri (born 1970), painter, print maker

== M ==
- Gail Mabo (born 1965), visual artist
- Elisabeth MacIntyre (1916–2004), illustrator
- Jessie Mackintosh (1891–1958), painter, photographer
- Constance Jenkins Macky (1883–1961), Australian-American painter
- Shirley Macnamara (born 1949), textile sculptor, painter
- Mary Macqueen (1912–1994), printmaker, drawing, mixed media artist
- Rosemary Madigan (1926–2019), sculptor, stonecarver, woodcarver
- Ruth Maddison (born 1945), photographer
- Bea Maddock (1934–2016), printmaker, painter, installation artist
- Maguerite Mahood (1901–1989), painter, ceramist, printmaker
- Hilarie Mais (born 1952), abstract painter, sculptor
- Gillian Mann (1939–2007), printmaker
- Diane Mantzaris (born 1962), digital artist, printmaker
- Nonggirrnga Marawili (c. 1939–2023), painter, printmaker
- Banduk Marika (1954–2021), artist, printmaker
- Stella Marks (1887–1985), painter
- Linda Marrinon (born 1959), painter, sculptor
- Mandy Martin (1952–2021), contemporary painter, printmaker and teacher
- Virginia Martin (fl 2010), fashion designer
- Nerine Martini (1968–2019), installation artist
- Jenni Kemarre Martiniello (born 1949), Aboriginal glass artist
- Mervinia Masterman (1901–1998), illustrator
- Helen Maudsley (born 1927), painter, visual essayist
- Galuma Maymuru (born 1951), painter
- Daphne Mayo (1895–1982), sculptor
- Kathleen McArthur (1915–2001), botanical illustrator, environmentalist, naturalist
- Alice McCall (fl 2004), fashion designer
- Jennifer McCamley (born 1957), conceptual artist
- Marie McMahon (born 1953), artist, printmaker
- Georgiana McCrae (1804–1890), painter, diarist
- Mahdi McCrae (1907–1990), artist and cartoonist
- Francine McDougall (living), filmmaker, photographer
- Erica McGilchrist (1926–2014), painter, set and costume designer
- Maidie McGowan (1906–1998), painter
- Carol McGregor (born 1961), Indigenous multi-media installation artist
- Queenie McKenzie (c. 1920–1998), painter
- Niah McLeod (born 1991), Indigenous contemporary artist
- Lucy McRae (born 1979), multimedia scientific fiction artist
- Penny Meagher (1935–1995), painter
- Lilian Marguerite Medland (1880–1955), illustrator, painter
- June Mendoza (1924–2024), portrait painter
- Dora Meeson (1869–1955), painter
- Annemieke Mein (born 1944), Dutch-born textile artist
- Wolla Meranda (1863–1951), writer and illustrator
- Mary Cockburn Mercer (1882–1963), painter
- Bertha Merfield (1869–1921), painter, muralist
- Ludmilla Meilerts (1908–1997), painter
- Lara Merrett (born 1971), visual artist
- Angelica Mesiti (born 1976), video artist
- Sanné Mestrom (born 1979), sculptor
- Margaret Michaelis-Sachs (1902–1985), Polish-born photographer
- Jan Mitchell (1940–2008), painter, sculptor, illustrator, printmaker
- Joanne Mitchelson (born 1971), painter
- Tracey Moffatt (born 1960), photographer, filmmaker, video artist
- Cheryl Moggs (living), watercolour painter, teacher
- Anne Montgomery (1908–1991), painter, print maker, muralist
- May and Mina Moore (May 1881–1931, Minna 1882–1957), photographers
- Mirka Mora (1928–2018), French-born painter, sculptor, mosaic artist
- Patricia Moran (1944–2017), painter
- Harriet Morgan (1830–1907), natural history illustrator
- Sally Morgan (born 1951), illustrator, author, dramatist
- Joan Morrison (1911–1969), cartoonist and book illustrator
- Christine Morrow (born 1971), British-born visual artist
- Eirene Mort (1879–1977), artist, art teacher, printmaker, cartoonist, fashion designer
- Celeste Mountjoy (living), artist, illustrator
- Patricia Mullins (born 1952), children's book illustrator
- Josephine Muntz Adams (1862–1949), painter
- Marrnyula Mununggurr (born 1964), Aboriginal painter
- Rerrkirrwanga Mununggurr (born 1971), Aboriginal painter
- Alice Jane Muskett (1869–1936), painter
- Vali Myers (1930–2003), visual artist and dancer

== N ==
- Doreen Reid Nakamarra (c. 1955–2009), painter
- Ruth Nalmakarra (born 1954), indigenous painter and weaver
- Rosella Namok (born 1979), painter
- Narputta Nangala (1933–2010), painter
- Yinarupa Nangala (born c. 1961), indigenous painter
- Biddy Rockman Napaljarri (born c. 1940), Warlpiri indigenous artist and painter
- Kitty Pultara Napaljarri (born c. 1930), indigenous painter
- Louisa Napaljarri (1930–2001), Warlpiri indigenous artist and painter
- Mona Rockman Napaljarri (born c. 1924), indigenous painter and potter
- Ada Andy Napaltjarri (born c. 1954), indigenous painter
- Daisy Jugadai Napaltjarri (c. 1955–2008), painter
- Eileen Napaltjarri (born 1956), indigenous painter
- Helen Nelson Napaljarri (born c. 1949), Aboriginal painter
- Norah Nelson Napaljarri (born 1956), Warlpiri indigenous artist and painter
- Sheila Brown Napaljarri (c. 1940–2003), indigenous painter
- Molly Jugadai Napaltjarri (c. 1954–2011), painter
- Ngoia Pollard Napaltjarri (c. 1948–2022), painter
- Nora Andy Napaltjarri (born c. 1957), indigenous painter
- Parara Napaltjarri (1944–2003), indigenous painter
- Tjunkiya Napaltjarri (c. 1927–2009), painter
- Wintjiya Napaltjarri (c. 1923–1934–2014), painter
- Makinti Napanangka (1930–2011), Pintupi indigenous artist and painter
- Dorothy Napangardi (c. 1950s–2013), painter
- Pansy Napangardi (born 1948), indigenous painter
- Lily Kelly Napangardi (born c. 1948), painter
- Yalti Napangati (born c. 1970), painter
- Nell (born 1975), artist, performance, video, sculpture, painting
- Jan Nelson (born 1955), sculptor, photographer, painter
- Norah Nelson Napaljarri (born 1956), indigenous painter
- Norie Neumark (living), American-born sound artist
- Lucy Newell (1906–1987), painter, textile printer
- Ann Newmarch (1945–2022), painter, printmaker, sculptor
- June Newton (1923–2021), photographer, actress
- Kathleen Ngale (born c. 1930), aboriginal Batik artist and painter
- Mavis Ngallametta (1944–2019), painter, weaver
- Hilda Rix Nicholas (1884–1961), painter
- Philippa Nikulinsky (born 1942), painter, illustrator
- Deborah Niland (born 1950), children's book illustrator, author
- Kilmeny Niland (1950–2009), painter, illustrator
- Rose Nolan (born 1959), visual artist
- Susan Norrie (born 1953), painter, video artist
- Bess Norriss (1878–1939), artist
- Rosaleen Norton (1917–1979), painter, occultist
- Gabriella Possum Nungurrayi (born 1967), contemporary indigenous artist
- Naata Nungurrayi (1932–2021), indigenous painter
- Lena Nyadbi (c. 1936–2024), painter, installation artist

== O ==
- Denese Oates (born 1955), sculptor
- Carla O'Brien (living), installation artist
- Kathleen O'Brien (1914–1991), comic artist, illustrator, fashion artist
- Mel O'Callaghan (born 1975), contemporary artist, video, performance, sculpture, installation, painting
- Ailsa O'Connor (1921–1980), sculptor, painter, teacher, activist
- Kathleen O'Connor (1876–1968), New Zealand-born painter
- Helen Ogilvie (1902–1993), painter, printmaker
- Pixie O'Harris (1903–1991), Welsh-born illustrator, cartoonist, painter, author
- Dora Ohlfsen-Bagge (1869–1948), sculptor and medallist
- Bronwyn Oliver (1959–2006), sculptor
- Narelle Oliver (1960–2016), painter, print maker, illustrator
- Margaret Olley (1923–2011), painter
- Rosemary Opala (1923–2008), illustrator, writer, nurse
- Mandy Ord (born 1974), comic artist
- Raquel Ormella (born 1969), multimedia artist
- Jan Ormerod (1946–2013), illustrator
- Jill Orr (born 1952), performance artist, photographer, installation artist
- Maria Josette Orsto (1962–2020), painter, printmaker, sculptor
- Ida Rentoul Outhwaite (1888–1960), children's book illustrator
- Brigita Ozolins (living), installation artist and art educator

== P ==
- Ewa Pachucka (1936–2020), textile artist, sculptor
- Margaret Paice (1920–2016), commercial artist, illustrator
- Josonia Palaitis (born 1949), painter
- Polixeni Papapetrou (1960–2018), photographer
- Wendy Paramor (1938–1975), painter, sculptor
- Jacki Parry (born 1941), painter, print maker
- Klytie Pate (1912–2010), ceramist
- Esther Paterson (1892–1971), painter, cartoonist, book illustrator
- Dorothy Ellsmore Paul (1902–1973), cartoonist
- Anelia Pavlova (born 1956), Bulgarian-born painter, printmaker, illustrator, ceramist
- Sue Pedley (born 1954), multimedia artist
- Adelaide Perry (1891–1973), artist, printmaker, art teacher
- Katie Perry (born 1980), fashion designer
- Gloria Petyarre (1942–2021), painter
- Jeanna Petyarre (born 1950), painter
- Kathleen Petyarre (c. 1940–2018), painter
- Nancy Petyarre (died 2009), painter
- Caroline Phillips (born 1966), sculptor
- Debra Phillips (born 1958), photographer, sculptor
- Frances Phoenix (1950–2017), artist, needlework, poster designer
- Patricia Piccinini (born 1965), mixed media artist, painter, sculptor, digital artist, installation artist
- Julianne Pierce (living), new media artist, curator, art critic
- Rosslynd Piggott (born 1958), installation artist. painter
- Gwyn Hanssen Pigott (1935–2013), ceramist
- Anne Pincus (born 1961), painter, sculptor
- Lillian Louisa Pitts (1872–1947), photographer
- Kerrie Poliness (born 1962), conceptual artist
- Elizabeth Presa (born 1956), visual artist
- Margaret Preston (1875–1963), painter, printmaker
- Jane Price (1860–1948), painter
- Thea Proctor (1879–1966), painter
- Betty Kuntiwa Pumani (born 1963), painter
- Angelina Pwerle (born c. 1939), painter
- Minnie Pwerle (died 2006), painter
- Mabel Pye (1894–1982), painter, print maker

== Q ==
- Mandy Quadrio (living), contemporary artist

== R ==
- Melinda Rackham (born 1959), digital artist
- Stephanie Radok (born 1954), artist, writer, curator
- Iso Rae (1860–1940), impressionist painter
- Tamara Ralph (born 1981), fashion designer
- Jessica Rankin (born 1971), embroiderer
- Eugenia Raskopoulos (born 1959), photography, video art
- r e a (born 1962), photographer, installation artist
- Geraldine Rede (1874–1943), artist
- Jacky Redgate (born 1955), sculptor, installation artist, photographer
- Norma Redpath (1928–2013), painter, sculptor
- Alison Rehfisch (1900–1974), painter
- Gladys Reynell (1881–1956), potter
- Kate Rich (living), sound artist, video artist
- Sally Rippin (living), children's writer and illustrator
- Therese Ritchie (born 1961), contemporary artist, writer, graphic designer
- Hilda Rix Nicholas (1884–1961), painter
- Freda Rhoda Robertshaw (1916–1997), artist, painter
- Peggy Rockman Napaljarri (born c.1940), indigenous artist and painter
- Toni Robertson (born 1953), visual artist, art historian printmaker
- Amanda Robins (born 1961), painter, drawer
- Julia Robinson (born 1981), sculptor, textile artist
- Florence Aline Rodway (1881–1971), painter, drawer, portrait artist
- Lisa Roet (born 1967), sculptor, drawer, photographer, filmmaker
- Romance was born (founded 2005), fashion house, designers Anna Plunkett and Luke Sales
- Madeleine Rosca (born 1977), comic artist
- Anne Ross (born 1959), fanciful bronze sculptures
- Joan Ross (born 1961), mixed media painter
- Maggie Napaljarri Ross (born c.1940), aboriginal painter
- Celia Rosser (born 1930), botanical illustrator
- Daisy Rossi (1879–1974), painter, interior designer
- Caroline Rothwell (born 1967), sculptor, installation artist
- Cybele Rowe (born 1963), ceramist
- Rachel Roxburgh (1915–1991), painter, potter
- Julie Rrap (born 1950), photographer, sculptor, painter
- Carol Rudyard (1922–2021), visual artist
- Nura Rupert (c. 1933–2016), printmaker, painter
- Lola Ryan (1925–2003), shellworker
- Rosemary Ryan (1926–1996), painter
- Therese Ryder (born 1946), painter, linguist

== S ==
- Jenny Sages (born 1933), Chinese-born painter, illustrator
- Kathleen Sauerbier (1903–1991), modernist artist
- Yhonnie Scarce (born 1973), glass artist
- Margaret Scobie (born 1948), aboriginal artist and painter
- Joyce Scott (born 1938), painter and ceramist
- Helena Scott (1832–1910), natural history illustrator
- Maria Jane Scott (1821–1899), painter, lithographer and novelist
- Nicola Scott (living), comic artist
- Sheila Scotter (1920–2012), fashion designer
- Margaret Senior (1917–1995), illustrator
- Dora Serle (1875–1968), painter
- Raelene Sharp (born 1957), portrait painter
- Wendy Sharpe (born 1960), painter
- Heather Shimmen (born 1957), painter, printmaker
- Ivy Shore (1915–1999), painter
- Irena Sibley (1943–2009), painter, illustrator
- Dawn Sime (1932–2001), abstract painter
- Norah Simpson (1895–1974), painter
- Alexia Sinclair (born 1976), photographer
- Sally Smart (born 1960), assemblage installation artist
- Gemma Smith (born 1978), painter, sculptor
- Grace Cossington Smith (1892–1984), painter, illustrator
- Treania Smith (1901–1990), painter, sculptor, art dealer and gallery owner
- Wendy Solling (1926–2002), sculptor
- Clara Southern (1861–1940), painter
- Bianca Spender (born 1977), fashion designer
- Ruby Spowart (1928–2024), photographer
- Ethel Spowers (1890–1947), printmaker, illustrator
- Robyn Stacey (born 1952), photographer, photo-artist
- Paula Stafford (1920–2022), fashion designer
- Miriam Stannage (1939–2016), painter, printmaker, photographer
- Madonna Staunton (1938–2019), artist, poet
- Sophie Steffanoni (1873–1906), landscape painter, embroiderer
- June Ethel Stephenson (1914–1999), painter, printmaker
- Amanda Stewart (born 1959), performance artist, poet
- Janet Agnes Cumbrae Stewart (1883–1960), painter
- Kunmanara Stewart (c.1938–2012), indigenous artist and painter
- Jacqui Stockdale (born 1968), contemporary artist
- Mary Stoddard (1852–1901), Scottish-born painter
- Constance Stokes (1906–1991), painter, drawer
- Dorothy Stoner (1904–1992), painter
- Marina Strocchi (born 1961), painter
- Nora Sumberg (born 1956), landscape painter
- Jane Sutherland (1853–1928), landscape painter
- Ruth Sutherland (1884–1948), painter
- Chern'ee Sutton (born 1996), contemporary visual artist
- Heather B. Swann (born 1961), sculptor
- Jo Sweatman (1872–1956), painter
- Linda Syddick Napaltjarri (born c. 1937), painter
- Eveline Winifred Syme (1888–1961), painter, printmaker

== T ==
- Takariya Napaltjarri (born c. 1960), indigenous artist and painter
- Jane Tanner (born 1946), children's book illustrator
- Tjunkaya Tapaya (born 1947), aboriginal batik artist
- Ruth Tarvydas (c. 1947–2014), fashion designer
- Latai Taumoepeau (born 1972), contemporary artist
- Pulya Taylor (born 1931), sculptor, craftsmaker, woodworker
- Stephanie Taylor (1899–1974), artist, printmaker, gallerist, lecturer, art writer, broadcaster
- Violet Teague (1872–1951), painter, mural designer
- Kathy Temin (born 1968), synthetic fur artist
- Betty Temple Watts (1901–1992), illustrator
- Thancoupie (1937–2011), sculptor, artist
- Shona Joy Thatcher (fl 2000), fashion designer
- Margaret Thomas (1842–1929), painter, writer
- Phyllis Thomas (1940 – 2018), painter
- Ann Thomson (born 1933), painter and sculptor
- Lesbia Thorpe (1919–2009), printmaker
- Emma Timbery (c. 1842–1916), shellworker
- Esme Timbery (1931–2023), shellworker
- Wingu Tingima (died 2010), painter
- Tjanpi Desert Weavers (from 1995), weavers
- Topsy Tjulyata (born 1931), sculptor, craftsmaker, woodworker
- Jasmine Togo-Brisby (born 1982), sculptor
- Sophia Tolli (fl 2006), fashion designer
- Aida Tomescu (born 1955), Romanian-born painter
- Mollie Tomlin (1923–2009), painter
- Mary Tonkin (born 1973), drawer
- Jessie Traill (1881–1967), printmaker, painter
- Ellen Trevorrow (born 1955), Ngarrindjeri weaver
- Barbara Tribe (1913–2000), sculptor, painter
- Zoja Trofimiuk (born 1952), Czech-born sculptor, printmaker
- Marie Tuck (1866–1947), painter, art educator
- Ruth Tuck (1914–2008), painter
- Maringka Tunkin (born 1959), artist, painter
- Mazie Turner (1954–2014), painter, photographer, sculptor
- Isabel May Tweddle (1875–1945), painter

== U ==
- Miriam-Rose Ungunmerr-Baumann (born 1950), painter, educator

== V ==
- May Vale (1862–1945), painter
- Lesley Vanderwalt (living), makeup artist
- Vicki Varvaressos (born 1949), painter
- Vexta (living), stencil artist, street artist
- Julie Vieusseux (1820–1878), painter
- Savanhdary Vongpoothorn (born 1971), Laotian-born painter

== W ==
- Megan Walch (born 1967), painter
- Anna Frances Walker (1830–1913), illustrator
- Rose A. Walker (1879–1942), painter
- Theresa Walker (1807–1876), sculptor, wax modeller
- Anne Wallace (born 1970), painter
- Kathleen Kemarre Wallace (1948–2024), indigenous painter, custodian
- Christian Waller (1894–1954), painter, writer, printmaker, illustrator, book designer, woodcutter, stained-glass artist
- Lynette Wallworth (living), installation artist
- Joan Walsh-Smith (born 1946), sculptor
- Ania Walwicz (1951–2020), visual artist, poet
- Rosie Ware (born 1959), textile designer, printmaker
- Sera Waters (born 1979), textile artist, arts writer, arts educator
- Jenny Watson (born 1951), painter
- Judy Watson (born 1959), multimedia artist
- Lilla Watson (born 1940), mixed media artist
- Betty Temple Watts (1901–1992), scientific illustrator
- Louise Weaver (born 1966), mixed media artist
- Johanna Weigel (1847–1940), fashion designer
- Barbara Weir (c. 1945–2023), Aboriginal painter
- Carlene West (born c. 1945), painter
- Katie West (living), interdisciplinary artist
- Kaylene Whiskey (fl 2010s), indigenous artist
- Ilka White (living), textile artist, sculptor
- Susan Dorothea White (born 1941), painter, sculptor, printmaker
- Wendy Whiteley (born 1941), landscape artist, flower artist
- Ada Whiting (1859–1953), painter, miniaturist
- Anne Wienholt (1920–2018), painter, sculptor, printmaker
- Normana Wight (1936–2026), painter, printmaker
- Cathy Wilcox (born 1963), comic artist, children's book illustrator
- Janie Wilkinson Whyte (1869–1953), painter
- Dora Wilson (1883–1946), British-born Australian painter and print maker
- Ju Ju Wilson (born 1960), contemporary indigenous artist
- Regina Pilawuk Wilson (born 1948), Aboriginal artist
- Justene Williams (born 1970), photographer, multimedia artist
- Jan Williamson (living), painter
- Liz Williamson (1949–2024), textile artist, educator
- Ruby Tjangawa Williamson (c. 1940–2017), painter, woodworker
- Dora Wilson (1883–1946), British-Australian painter and print maker
- Ruby Winckler (1886–1974), painter, children's book illustrator
- Margery Withers (1894–1966), painter
- Women's Domestic Needlework Group est 1976, traditional craft work
- Maeve Woods (1933–2026), painter, collage artist
- Pauline Nakamarra Woods (born 1949), Aboriginal artist and painter
- Tjayanka Woods (born c. 1935), painter, weaver
- Marjorie Woolcock (1898–1998), painter, sculptor
- Margaret Worth (born 1944), painter, screenprinter, sculptor
- Judith Wright (born 1945), painter, videomaker, sculptor, printmaker

== X ==
- Bin Xie (born 1957), Chinese-born painter

== Y ==
- Paji Honeychild Yankarr (c. 1912–2004), painter
- Noela Young (1930–2018), book illustrator and children's author
- Yaritji Young (born c. 1956), painter
- Gulumbu Yunupingu (1943–2012), indigenous artist
- Nancy Gaymala Yunupingu (c.1935–2005), indigenous bark painter and print maker
- Nyapanyapa Yunupingu (c. 1945–2021), painter

== Z ==
- Anne Zahalka (born 1957), photographer
- Carla Zampatti (1938–2021), fashion designer
- Aheda Zanetti (born 1967), fashion designer
