= Simone LeAmon =

Australian curator and designer

- Born: 1971 (age 54–55); Melbourne, Australia
- Occupations: Designer, Curator
- Title: Adjunct Professor

Academic background
- Education: Victorian College of the Arts, University of Melbourne, RMIT University

Academic work
- Institutions: RMIT University
- Website: https://www.simoneleamon.com

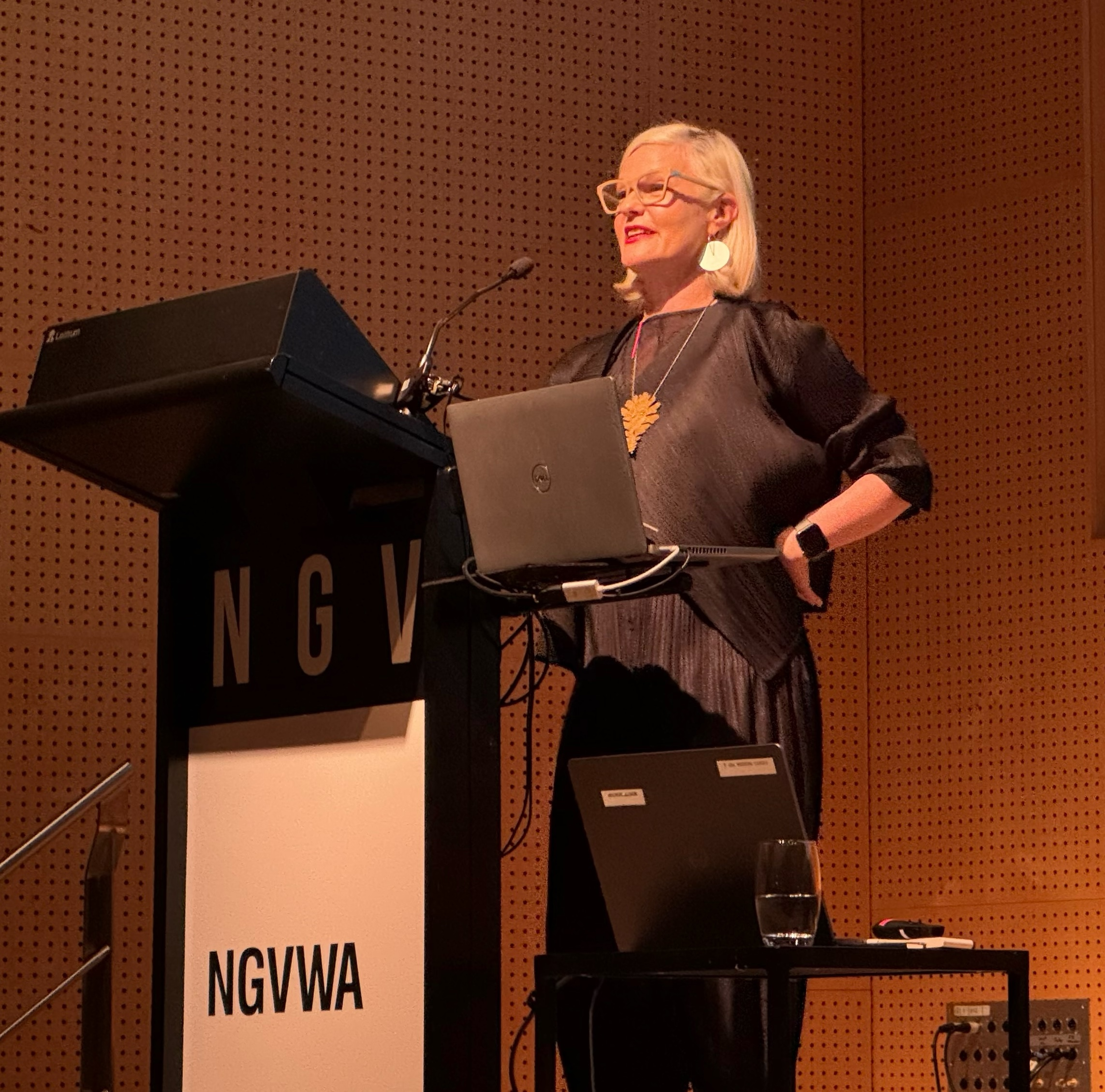
LeAmon delivering the opening address at the NGVWA Annual Lecture (National Gallery of Victoria Women's Association), NGV Melbourne, August 2024.

Simone LeAmon is an Australian designer, artist, curator and educator. LeAmon is the chief executive officer of the Design Institute of Australia. From 2015–25, LeAmon was the inaugural Hugh D.T Williamson Curator of Contemporary Design and Architecture at the National Gallery of Victoria, Melbourne. LeAmon is also an adjunct professor in design and social context, RMIT University, Melbourne.

== Early life and education ==
LeAmon was born in Melbourne, Australia in 1971. She graduated in 1989 from the Box Hill Institute of TAFE in Melbourne, where she received an Advanced Certificate of Art and Design. In 1992, she graduated from the Victorian College of the Arts, Melbourne University, receiving a Bachelor of Fine Art. In 2004, she received a Master of Design, through the industrial design program from the Royal Melbourne Institute of Technology (RMIT) University.

== Awards ==
LeAmon was the recipient of the Ambassador category in the Design Anthology Awards 2024 to "recognise individuals and organisations that are actively working to change the public’s perceptions of what design in the Asia Pacific region means today".

In 2023, LeAmon was included in the INDE.Awards Luminary category, which "pays tribute to the extraordinary contribution of architecture and design practitioners who have indelibly influenced their community, country, region and the world in which we live".

LeAmon was awarded the Women in Design Award 2021 by Good Design Australia for "her life-long passion and unwavering dedication to the design profession in Australia".

She was the 2009 winner of the national Cicely and Colin Rigg Contemporary Design Award, National Gallery of Victoria for her Lepidoptera Chair design.

In 2007, LeAmon was identified in the top 100 product designers in the world in the book &Fork: 100 Designers, 10 Curators, 10 Good Designs (Phaidon Press, 2007) and in The Bulletin Magazine's "Smart 100: Australia’s Best and Brightest".

== Work and career ==
=== Lecturer, RMIT University ===
LeAmon is currently an Adjunct Professor in the College of Design and Social Context at RMIT University. She also supervised honours students and taught product design and design history in the Industrial Design Department from 2003 to 2015 at the RMIT School of Architecture and Design.

=== Artist and designer ===
LeAmon has co-founded two design studios: n+1 equals interdisciplinary studio (1998-2003) with Charles Anderson; and Simone LeAmon Design and Creative Strategy (2003-2015). Between 2013 and 2016, LeAmon also had a collaborative practice with architect Edmund Carter. LeAmon's art and design practice has been applied to product and furniture design, interior design, contemporary jewellery, and speculative design.

Well known design projects by LeAmon include: the crescent design for the Australian Islamic Centre; Lighting products for Rakumba Lighting; Bespoke lift interiors for the Juilliard Group; Melbourne Arts Walk masterplan and design for Arts Centre Melbourne; and her popular Bowling Arm bangles.

Between 2007 and 2010, LeAmon was creative director for Australian manufacturer PLANEX, and was invited to present design concepts for international manufacturers Oluce and Dainese, Italy.

LeAmon's art and design work has been exhibited in solo and group exhibitions internationally, including: "Unexpected Pleasures", Design Museum London (2012); "Freestyle: New Australian Design for Living", Triennale di Milano (2008); "Anytime Soon", 1000 Eventi Milano (2005); "Quiet Collision", Viafarini Gallery Milano (2003); and "MOTO Showroom", Gertrude Contemporary Arts Spaces Melbourne (2003).

=== Curator, National Gallery of Victoria (NGV), Melbourne ===
In 2013, LeAmon was guest curator and co-exhibition designer for the design component NGV's groundbreaking exhibition "Melbourne Now: The Design Wall" installation, which featured 700 objects and 40 design projects by leading Melbourne product designers and manufacturers.

In 2015, LeAmon was appointed to the new Department of Contemporary Architecture and Design at the NGV. The NGV department is the first of its kind for an art gallery in Australia and LeAmon has co-curated an extensive program of exhibitions and collecting of Australian and international contemporary design including the annual Melbourne Design Week.

In 2021, LeAmon was appointed curator of the inaugural Melbourne Design Fair, organised by the National Gallery of Victoria in collaboration with the Melbourne Art Foundation.

LeAmon's curatorial exhibitions at the NGV include:

- NGV Triennial (2017, 2020 and 2023);
- Melbourne Now including the Design Wall, Jewellery Now, and No House Style (2023);
- MECCA X NGV Women in Design Commission (2023, 2024 and 2025);
- History in the making (2021);
- Lucy McRae: Body Architect (2019);
- Black Bamboo: Contemporary Bamboo Furniture Design From Mer (2019);
- Designing Women (2018);
- Contemporary lei and body adornment from the Torres Straits (2018);
- Creating the Contemporary Chair (2017);
- Art of the Pacific (2016);
- Rigg Design Prize in 2015, 2018, 2022 and 2025.

=== Design Institute of Australia ===
LeAmon became chief executive officer of the Design Institute of Australia in 2025.
