= Lillian Louisa Pitts =

Australian artist and photographer

Lillian Louisa Pitts (1872 – 1947), also known as L.L.P., was an Australian music teacher, artist and professional photographer. Pitts grew up with a love for music and the arts and made her living by teaching music classes and oil-painting. Her experience with painting and photography began when she would produce postcard portraits of friends and family. Pitts died in 1947.

== Biography ==
Pitts was born at Bairnsdale in Victoria, where she was raised in an affluent and devout Methodist household. After her family was affected by an economic depression in the 1890s, they moved to a pioneer community in Northern Victoria. In 1907 Pitts began studying visual arts with A.M.E. Bale in Melbourne. While studying sold personal portraits as recommended by her teacher. Pitts' earliest known photograph dates to 1904. Her first photographs demonstrate a strong understanding of technique and composition.

A collection of 600 negatives of Pitts' photography is housed at the Museums Victoria. These photographs by Pitts depict scenes of daily life, recreation, and rural life and work. Pitts' photography was simple in its composition, depicting landscapes and rural people in routine work or daily activities. Other than depicting rural life in Victoria, Pitts also photographed Aboriginal life, for example in her photograph Aboriginal Man Wearing Possum Skin Cloak, Swan Hill, circa 1915. By photographing indigenous people, Pitts acknowledged the Aboriginal people's role in their community when others at the time would not. Pitts also loved to photograph children. Her photographs of children were especially popular and she won many prizes for those pieces and had her work featured in newspapers and publications.

During her prime as an artist, Pitts became great friends with the photographer J.P. (Jas) Campbell. Pitts and Campbell would travel together on photography expeditions where they would exchange ideas and critique each other's work.

Pitts is also featured in many photography books and collections such as The Story of the Camera in Australia by Jack Cato and Merrigum Frank compiled by Euan McGilliviary and Matthew Nickson which is a children's book featuring Pitts' photographs.

Towards the end of her life, Pitts was again impacted by the Great Depression and moved towards oil painting as her artistic outlet. In this phase of her career, Pitts was inspired by her family and the nature around her. When her family moved to their pioneer village, they owned an orchard, which Pitts often painted. Pitts would also often paint young women.

== Collections ==
- Lillian Louisa Pitts Collection, Museums Victoria
- National Gallery of Australia
