= Tania Ferrier =

Australian artist (born 1958)

- Born: 1958 (age 67–68); Perth, Western Australia, Australia
- Education: Western Australian College of Advanced Education, W.A.I.T (now Curtin University)
- Known for: Painting Installation Art Feminist Fashion
- Notable work: ANGRY UNDERWEAR, HUMMANINSIDE, THE QUOD PROJECT, TALKBACK
- Website: taniaferrier.com.au

Tania Ferrier is a contemporary Australian artist. She was born in 1958 in Perth, Western Australia. She moved to New York and worked there as an artist between 1988 and 1992. In 1992 she returned to Perth. She moved to Melbourne in 2012 and returned to Perth in 2019.

Angry Underwear, a feminist fashion project began in 1988 when Ferrier witnessed the sexual assault of a stripper in Brooklyn, New York. Ferrier created a range of fabric painted cotton underwear, featuring vicious animal faces, for the strippers to wear on stage as a performative intervention in retaliation – Art as a weapon. The project went onto to garner international media attention when famous celebrities wore her underwear, including Madonna.

The project became the subject of a feature film script, titled Angry Underwear, which is in development through funding from the Australian government. Ferrier co-wrote the script with Kelly Lefever. The script was optioned by Feisty Dame Productions in Perth, Western Australia.

== Artist career ==
Ferrier developed an art practice primarily as a painter on themes of social justice, feminism and the history of the places she has lived. Between 1990 and 2020 Ferrier worked in the Film & TV industry in New York and Australia as a production designer on Clean, Shaven and as set dresser, continuing this work concurrent with her art practice. In Ferrier’s earlier career she produced a series of large scale charcoal illustrations from texts in the Battye Library about colonial frontier massacres titled The Bicentennial Series. Three of these works are now held in the Murdoch University, Edith Cowan University and Albany art collections.

In 1998 Ferrier travelled to New York and squatted in an abandoned building in Manhattan. She began her feminist fashion project Angry Underwear after witnessing the sexual assault of a stripper at Club Wild Fyre in Brooklyn where Ferrier worked as a bartender. An exclusive lingerie store in Manhattan, Enelra Lingerie, began selling Angry Underwear and International media covered the story. Ferrier returned to Perth in 1989 for a funded exhibition of Angry Underwear at Artemis Gallery in Perth. The shadow minister for the arts, Mr. Phillip Pendal, deemed the exhibition obscene and an inappropriate use of government funding on a Channel 7 news report on April 1, 1989. The media attention brought hundreds of people to the exhibition and two of Ferrier’s paintings were bought by the Art Gallery of Western Australia. Ferrier returned to New York and continued the underwear project until she returned to live in Perth again in 1992.

Ferrier began developing a figurative expressionist style of painting for several solo exhibitions and received numerous awards and artist residencies. In 2007 Ferrier began an exploration of a multi-disciplinary art practice which was influenced by her work in film and television. She introduced photography, set building and consultation with local Aboriginal Elders in The Quod Project in 2011, exploring her family history at Rottnest Island as a layer that obscured the Aboriginal history as a penal colony.

In the follow-on exhibition, Hummaninside in 2013 at the Fremantle Prison gallery Ferrier consulted with local Aboriginal people about their family histories of incarceration and collaborated with photographer James Kerr and Aboriginal film maker Glen Stasiuk in the production of the work.

In 2012 Ferrier was awarded The Go-Anywhere Residency through Artsource and travelled extensively in the United States of America in 2013 researching for Talkback, an exhibition that explored race relations and identity through photography and video interviews. This project grew into a collaboration with USA artists Yulissa Morales, Mirla Jackson, US and Australian artist Laura Mitchell and Australian artist Leslie Morgan. Talkback was exhibited in Perth in 2014, Melbourne in 2015, Lynchburg USA in 2015 and in New York USA in 2016.

Ferrier moved to live in Melbourne in 2013 and continued her art practice as well as working as a set dresser in the film and television industry.

She exhibited regularly in Melbourne and Perth during this time and began writing a feature film script based on her own life. This script is currently in development and has received funding from Screen Australia and Screen West as well as reaching second round, Sundance Film Labs in 2018 and 2019.

== Education ==
- Western Australian College of Advanced Education
- Bachelor of Fine Arts, Western Australian Institute of Technology (now Curtin University), Bentley, Western Australia.
