= Elvie Hill =

Australian fashion designer

Elvie Hill (1917 – 31 July 2018) was an Australian fashion designer.

== Career ==
Elvie Hill established an eponymous label in the 1940s in Melbourne and became well known for her elegant and feminine designs. She dressed some of Australia's best known women, including Lady Sonia McMahon and Dame Pattie Menzies, and was also known for her boutiques in Melbourne (her boutique on the "Paris-end" of Collins Street stayed open until 1991). Hill's work was influenced by other designers such as Norman Hartnell. She retired at age 80 in 1999. In 2016, photographer Tom McEvoy staged a retrospective as part of Melbourne Fashion Festival's Cultural Program, citing her work as an important piece of Australian fashion history at risk of being forgotten. Hill celebrated her 100th birthday in January 2018 and died in July 2018.
