= Kathleen Kemarre Wallace =

Australian Aboriginal artist (1948–2024)

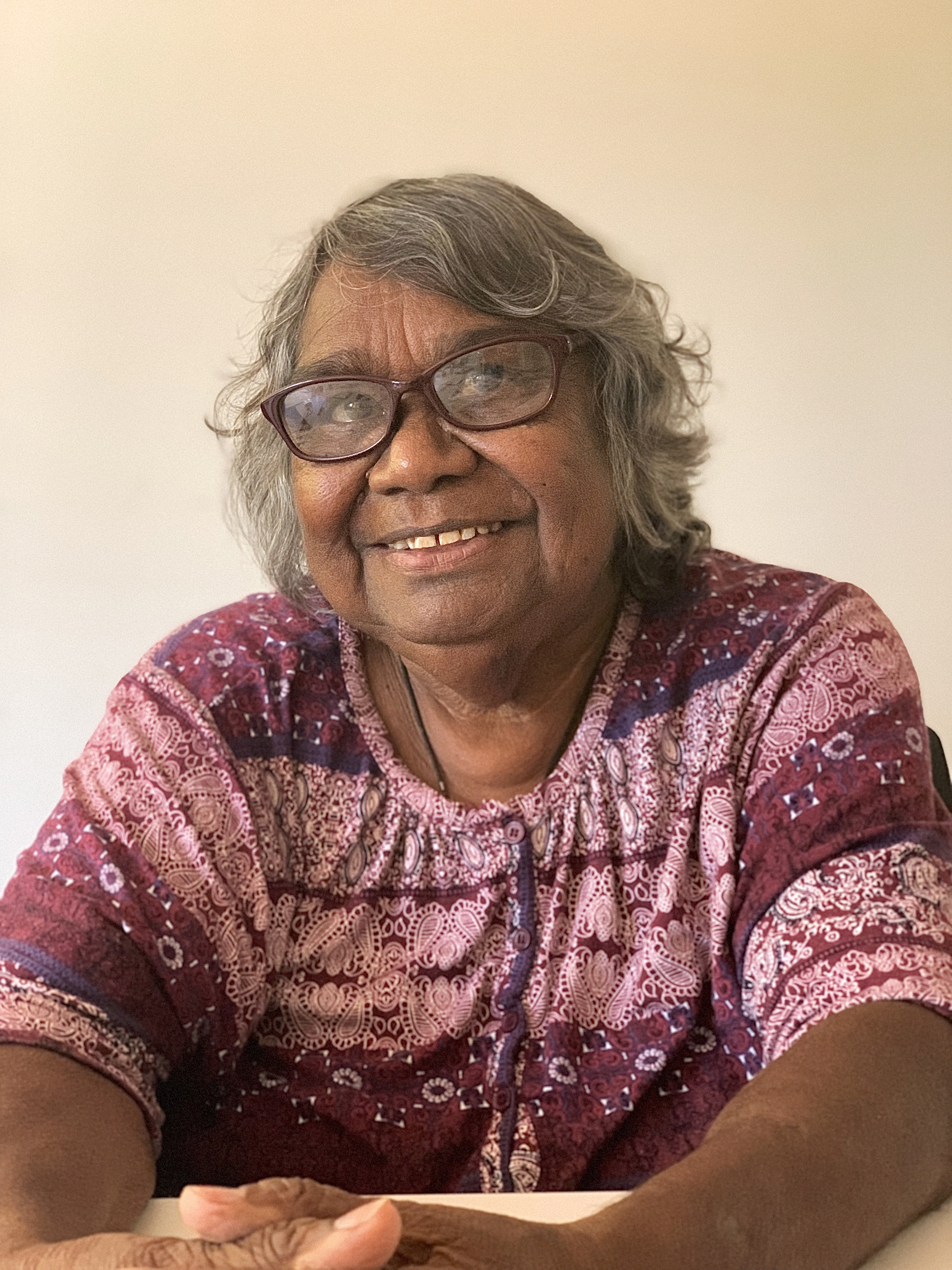
Kathleen Kemarre Wallace

Kathleen Kemarre Wallace (1 July 1948 – 28 February 2024), was an Eastern Arrernte artist, author, custodian and cultural leader from Ltyentye Apurte in the Northern Territory of Australia.

== Early life ==
Wallace was born on 1 July 1948 near Ltyentye Apurte, a remote area of Central Australia. She was a senior Eastern Arrernte speaker. Her family kept her away from stations and missions to prevent her removal under the Aboriginals Ordinance 1918.

When she was 13, her family was forced to move to Santa Teresa Mission, now Ltyentye Apurte Community. This move was caused by severe drought and the interruption of traditional hunting and food gathering by encroaching station activities.

== Art career ==
In 1989 Wallace was a founding member of Keringke Arts and, since then, become one of their most successful artists. Her work is represented in many national and international collections.

Her artworks were very influenced by her Catholic faith:

When I went to Santa Teresa, nuns taught me the Bible. When I came to Santa Teresa I couldn't speak English — I learned it there," she said. [Catholicism and my family's traditional beliefs] are similar — it wasn't hard for me. My grandfather's ancestors gave him a dream of three circles — grandfather, father and totem spirit — like the Holy Trinity.

— Kathleen Kemarre Wallace,

In October 2019 the stained glass window that Wallace designed was installed at the Our Lady of Sacred Heart Catholic Church in Alice Springs which is celebrated for showing the blending of Catholic and Indigenous beliefs. The title of the painting, which became the stained glass is Urtakwerte Atywerrenge Anthurre or, in English, Very Sacred Heart and it depicts the Virgin Mary and Jesus standing on a sandhill and different parts of the painting representing different aspects of her blended faith.

== Other activities ==
Wallace co-wrote two books: Plants of the Santa Teresa region of Central Australia, with Jane Davis (1986), and, with Judy Lovell (2009), and Listen deeply: let these stories in.

She also worked as a teacher and served her community as an elected councillor for Ltyentye Apurte, and was also a member of the executive committee of Desart.

She was a senior advisor on the Indigemoji app launched in 2019. This app provides 90 emojis representing central Australia's Indigenous Arrernte culture and is Australia's first set of Indigenous emojis.

== Recognition and awards ==
- 2001: Finalist, National Aboriginal and Torres Strait Islander Art Award
- 2010: Shortlist, Territory Read Awards for Listen deeply: let these stories in
- 2020: Honoree, Public Service & Activism, Webby Award for Indigemoji
- 2020: Honorary Mention, Digital Communities, Prix Ars Electronica for Indigemoji
- 2020: Best Digital Product, First Nations Media Awards for Indigemoji
- 2023: Honorary doctorate from the Batchelor Institute of Indigenous Tertiary Education, in recognition of her deep cultural knowledge and years of educating others

== Personal life and death ==
Wallace lived on her homelands her whole life and she always viewed it as her responsibility to ensure traditional knowledge is handed on, especially through art and storytelling.

Wallace and her husband Douglas had no children of their own but they raised more than 30 children throughout their marriage; taking in children when they were neglected or their parents were drinking. This earned her the nickname "Mum".

She died on 28 February 2024.
