= Dagmar Evelyn Cyrulla =

Australian contemporary artist

Dagmar Evelyn Cyrulla is an Australian contemporary artist and two times Archibald finalist. For the past three years she has been named one of Australia's 100 hottest collectable artists. Her work is about relationships, especially those from a woman's perspective. In 2017, her painting, 'I Am' was 'Highly Commended' in the Doug Moran portrait prize. In 2017 her work 'The phone call IV' won the Manning regional gallery's "Naked and Nude" art prize.

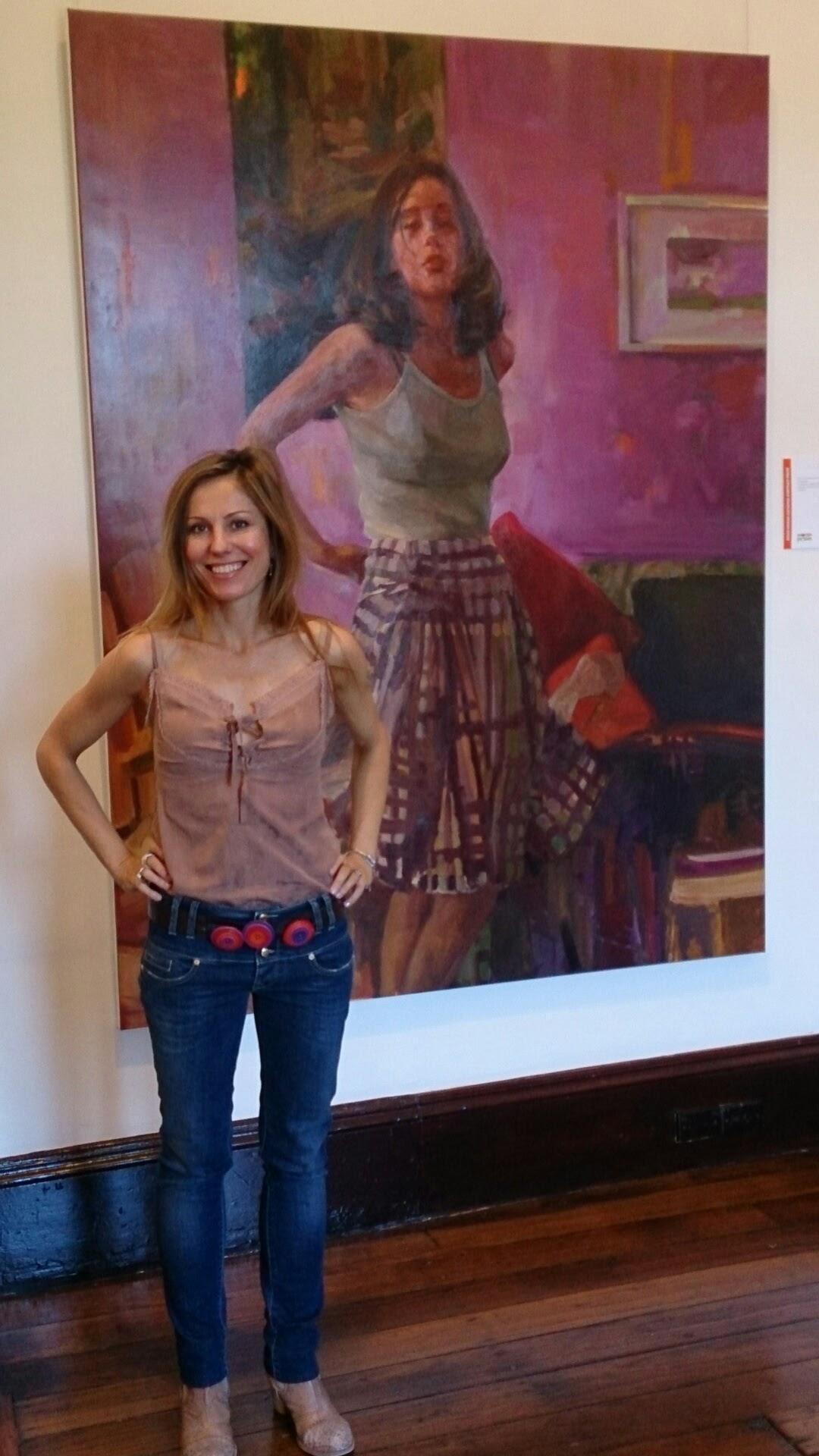
Cyrulla with her Doug Moran 2014 finalist painting, 'Alice'.

== Background ==
Cyrulla was born in Germany, at the age of one she came to live in Sydney along with her two siblings. Cyrulla graduated a degree in Bachelor of Visual Arts from University of Western Sydney in 1987. In 2009 she earned her Masters of Fine Art via scholarship at Monash University. She has participated in group exhibitions since 1988, and has held solo exhibitions in Perth, Melbourne & Sydney.

== Artistic work ==
Cyrulla's work revolves around human relatedness. In October 2018 her exhibited work at Wagner Contemporary Gallery was analysed as “Cyrulla intends to challenge our thoughts in a newly interconnected world that is increasingly concerned with the future of women’s rights and passionately discussing the nuances of gender equality. Displaying a more traditional approach to feminist practice, Cyrulla’s women ‘all have a certain strength, but without losing their femininity or vulnerability.’ They appear confident in their exposure and beautiful in their imperfection, whether they are captured as ‘they reflect on themselves and their world unperturbed by the viewer’s gaze’, or as they meet our eyes in defiance of objectification. The Australian newspaper described her work as "Recognised for producing works of stirring psychological intensity, Cyrulla has brought a new dimension to contemporary Australian art". Australian artist profile depicted her work as "natural with the technological", while ABC Radio National termed her a 'portrait painter'.

In 2014, Cyrulla was invited to become a member of the Twenty Melbourne Painters Society

Cyrulla was the winner of the Williamstown Festival Contemporary Art prize, and the Naked and Nude Art Prize 2017 was hung in the Dobell Prize at the Art Gallery of New South Wales, 5 times, including for 'Fleeting' in 2011.

In August 2024 she was featured in an episode of Foreign Influence TV to talk about her work and inspiration derived from her German heritage. Cyrulla described herself to interviewer Elina Reddy as a 'storyteller', using her art as her medium.

In 2024 Dagmar Cyrulla's painting 'Modern Muse II' was featured on the front cover of Paul McGillick's book 'Slow Reveal - The Nude in Australian Art'.

== Public collections ==
- Maitland Regional Art Gallery
- City of Port Phillip – Louisa Briggs bronze & stone statue commission.
- Stanthorpe Regional Art Gallery
- Caloundra Regional Gallery.
- Parliament House South Australia – Portrait of Sir Douglas Nicholls
- Manning Regional Art Gallery
- Warrnambool Regional Art Gallery
- Bathurst Regional Gallery
- Ballarat Regional Gallery (A Moment II, The Carer III.)
- Muswellbrook Regional Art Gallery
- Swan Hill Regional Art Gallery
- Tweed River Regional Art Gallery
- Cowra Regional Gallery
- Chicago Printmakers Collective
- London Print Workshop

== Solo exhibitions ==
- 2026 ‘Etre’ Lennox St. Gallery, Richmond
- 2025 Etre’ Galerie La Source, Dijon France
- 2023 Wagner Contemporary (November) "Observing & reflecting"
- 2022 Wagner Contemporary (November) "End of a chapter"
- 2021 Wagner Contemporary (November) "Recent Works"
- 2018 Wagner Contemporary (October) "I Am"
- 2016 Wagner Contemporary (September) “Moments”
- 2015 Galerie Notre Dame France (April)
- 2014 Reflection Wagner Art Gallery, New South Wales, Australia

== Prizes and competitions ==
- 2024 Archibald Finalist
- 2021 Royal South Australian Society of Arts (RSASA) Portrait Prize winner
- 2021 Archibald Prize finalist
- 2019 Finalist Dobell drawing prize, https://www.dobell.nas.edu.au/finalists-1
- 2017 Moran Portrait prize - finalist & highly commended by judges
- 2017 Naked and Nude - winner of Manning Regional Gallery
- 2014 Doug Moran - Semi Finalist and finalist
- 2011 Finalist Dobell drawing prize, Art Gallery of New South Wales, Sydney
