= Shona Joy Thatcher =

Australian fashion designer

- Born: Melbourne, Australia
- Occupation: Fashion designer
- Employer: Shona Joy
- Spouse: Marty McGrath
- Children: 2

Shona Joy Thatcher is an Australian fashion designer and owner of the label Shona Joy.

== Early life ==
Born in Melbourne, Australia Thatcher grew up loving to watch her mother get ready for an event or a party and having input into what she wore. As a child Thatcher began collecting classic pieces at vintage stores and hunting for treasures at markets. Her mother died when Thatcher was in her mid-twenties. Thatcher studied a BA of textile design then worked as a Design Assistant at Australian brands "Charlie Brown" and later at "Marcs".

== Career ==
In 2000, Thatcher began selling her hand painted designs at Spitalfields and Portobello markets in London and then the Bondi Beach and Paddington Markets. Thatcher then designed a capsule collection of hand painted t-shirts for Belinda Seper's Corner Shop in Paddington and Christy Turlington bought them in every color. After the success of her T-shirts, the first Shona Joy collection was sold into David Jones. At the time there was a team of two in the brand and had a mix of silks and cotton voiles and customised prints in easy, voluminous silhouettes. Thatcher realised she could have a successful career in fashion after the first collection had a 94% sell thru in the first week at David Jones.

The brand produces five ready-to-wear collections annually, which are stocked internationally through retailers including David Jones, Harrods, Revolve, Intermix, Harvey Nichols and Bloomingdale's. Shona Joy had also developed a presence in the bridesmaid and evening wear market.

In 2021, Shona Joy presented at Afterpay Australian Fashion Week via a virtual experience led by panoramic images on the beaches of Green Island in Manyana, New South Wales near where Thatcher resides.

In October 2026, Thatcher announced she would shut down Shona Joy to focus on her family. Selling the business was explored but Thatcher said “nothing felt like the right fit”.

== Personal life ==
Thatcher is married to Marty McGrath, a property investor. The couple have two sons.
