= Parara Napaltjarri =

Australian Aboriginal artist

- Born: 1944
- Died: 2003
- Known for: Painting

Parara Napaltjarri (c. 1944–2003) was a Pintupi-speaking Indigenous artist from Australia's Western Desert region. Her paintings are included in the collection of the Art Gallery of New South Wales.

== Life ==
Parara was born around 1944 or 1945. The ambiguity around the year of birth is in part because Indigenous Australians operate using a different conception of time, often estimating dates through comparisons with the occurrence of other events.

'Napaljarri' (in Warlpiri) or 'Napaltjarri' (in Western Desert dialects) is a skin name, one of sixteen used to denote the subsections or subgroups in the kinship system of central Australian Indigenous people. These names define kinship relationships that influence preferred marriage partners and may be associated with particular totems. Although they may be used as terms of address, they are not surnames in the sense used by Europeans. Thus 'Parara' is the element of the artist's name that is specifically hers.

Parara and her siblings Yakari Napaltjarri, Joseph Jurra Tjapaltjarri and Payu Napaltjarri were the children of Anmanari Nangala and Kirindji Kuku Tjungurrayi. Parara and Payu were co-wives of Freddy West Tjakamarra, who was also married at one stage to artist Takariya Napaltjarri. Parara moved to Papunya with Freddy West in 1963, and died in 2003.

== Art ==
=== Background ===
Contemporary Indigenous art of the western desert began when Indigenous men at Papunya began painting in 1971, assisted by teacher Geoffrey Bardon. Their work, which used acrylic paints to create designs representing body painting and ground sculptures, rapidly spread across Indigenous communities of central Australia, particularly following the commencement of a government-sanctioned art program in central Australia in 1983. By the 1980s and 1990s, such work was being exhibited internationally. The first artists, including all of the founders of the Papunya Tula artists' company, had been men, and there was resistance amongst the Pintupi men of central Australia to women painting. However, there was also a desire amongst many of the women to participate, and in the 1990s large numbers of them began to create paintings. In the western desert communities such as Kintore, Yuendumu, Balgo, and on the outstations, people were beginning to create art works expressly for exhibition and sale.

=== Career ===
Parara commenced painting for the famous Papunya Tula artists cooperative in June 1996, with her sister Payu commencing painting for them at the same time. Work by Parara is held by the Art Gallery of New Wales, including 1996 painting Women's Business at Marapinti portraying women's ceremonies at the rockhole site of Marapinti, west of Kiwirrkurra Community, Western Australia.

== Collections ==
- Art Gallery of New South Wales
