= Mollie Tomlin =

Australian artist (1923–2009)

- Born: Mollie Constance Wedd; 1923; Tasmania, Australia
- Died: 2009 (aged 85–86); Tasmania, Australia
- Known for: Watercolourist
- Awards: Order of Australia Medal

Mollie Tomlin OAM (1923–2009) was a watercolour artist from Tasmania, Australia.

== Early life ==
Born Mollie Constance Wedd in 1923, her mother died when Tomlin was three weeks old. Her father was shattered by his wife's death and, despite trying to care for Tomlin, he eventually passed her to Tomlin's maternal grandmother, with whom Tomlin lived until after she married.

Tomlin was schooled in Moonah, Tasmania, until the age of 13. Due to the need to earn an income, she attended business college. Throughout her career as a secretary and raising seven children, Tomlin retained her interest in art.

== Art career ==
It was not until the age of 50 that Tomlin took art lessons through an Adult Education class. Here, Tomlin developed her passion and skill for drawing and painting.

In 1979, Tomlin had a severe heart attack and underwent surgery. During this time she had recollections and memories of her childhood, which inspired her to record them in her works. These historical buildings and landscapes of Tasmania became her signature pieces. She died in January 2009.

Throughout Tomlin's life, she took great interest in helping and teaching others. She held art classes for organizations and, with her husband Ernie, volunteered with Heartbeat Tasmania to offer support to others in regards to heart surgery.

== Commissions ==
1986 saw the publication of the history of the City of Glenorchy: Glenorchy 1804-1864. Forty of Tomlin's sketches were included in the book and the cover was a reproduction of one of her paintings.

In 1988 Tomlin was commissioned to do ten large watercolours depicting past historic buildings of the City of Glenorchy, Tasmania as a Bicentennial project.

In 1998 the Glenorchy City Council published Glenorchy 1964-1998 for which Tomlin produced 60 sketches of buildings, landscapes, features and items of general interest, and a large painting depicting Glenorchy as it is today. This painting has been reproduced as the cover of the book.

In 1999 Tomlin received another commission, this time from the Military Museum, Hobart, for twelve sketches and six watercolours of Anglesea Barracks buildings and related features.

== Exhibitions ==
Tomlin exhibited many works many over the years with prominent associations as follows:

- The Art Society of Tasmania
- The Tasmanian Art Group
- The Australian Society of Miniature Artists
- The Australian Guild of Realist Artists

== Accomplishments ==
Prominent awards of Tomlin consist of an Order of Australia Medal and a Glenorchy Australia Day Citizen Award. Other awards consist of third prize for her watercolour at the Royal Agricultural Show 1991 in Hobart, 1st Prize for her watercolour in the “Life. Be In It” Heritage Exhibition in 1991 and in 1995 her watercolour of ‘Cleburne’ won a Commemorative Medallion in the People’s Choice category of the Australia Day Council Tasmanian Art Exhibition.
