= Lara Merrett =

Australian visual artist (born 1971)

Lara Merrett (born 1971) is an Australian visual artist who lives and works in Melbourne, Australia.
