= Maude Haydon =

Australian artist (1886–1978)

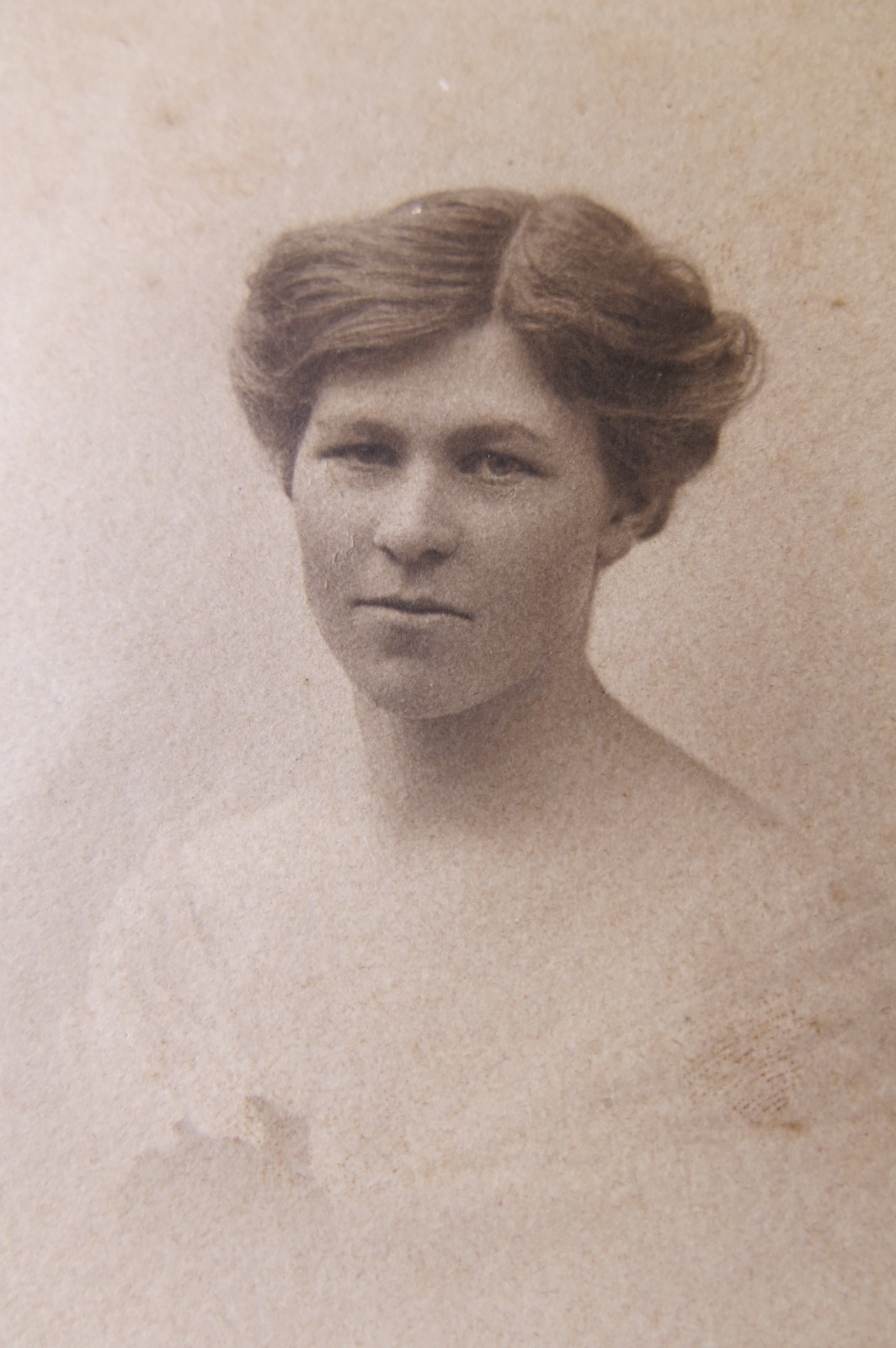
Maude Haydon 1910

Maude Mary Haydon (1886 – 1978) was an Australian pastoral and landscape artist.

== Early life ==
Maude Mary Haydon was born at 'Bloomfield' homestead near Murrurundi, New South Wales on 6 November 1886. She was raised a middle child in a pastoral family of 6 on Bloomfield station, but was handicapped by deafness. Maude Haydon was a good horsewoman who rode from an early age under the watchful eye of her father Bernard Haydon a renowned horseman and master of Bloomfield. She developed and maintained a keen interest in the sport of horse racing for the rest of her life. Maude Haydon held strong Christian beliefs all her life and attended St Luke's Anglican church, Blandford, and often decorated it with flowers from her garden at Bloomfield. She finished her education at 17 years of age at SCEGGS, Darlinghurst, Sydney, where she showed a talent for art.

== Career ==
Maude Haydon was trained by English art teacher Julian Ashton at his renowned Art School in Sydney in the 1900s. She caused a moral scandal when she took a group of Bohemian art students camping in the mountains on H.L. White's Belltrees station at Woolooma near Scone. There they climbed 900 metres above the landscape to the top of Mt Woolooma. Maude Haydon produced large numbers of watercolour style works, depicting scenes of Bloomfield and the landscapes of the Upper Hunter district over many years. She contributed works to the Women Artists exhibition in Sydney in 1934. Maude Haydon frequently gave her paintings away to family and friends and they formed a tangible and evocative bond with Bloomfield. She also donated them to assist in fundraising.

Maude Haydon travelled at 27 years of age with her sister Madge Haydon, on a steamship to Europe to obtain specialist medical treatment for deafness in Vienna, Austria in 1914, but unfortunately World War I (WWI) interrupted the plan. However the sisters were adventurous and they turned disappointment into a holiday and saw the sights. Maude Haydon and her sister visited Victorian portrait artist Agnes Goodsir and her brother, banker and friend of Bernard Haydon, Noel Goodsir in Maida Vale, London, England. They all climbed 1,300 metres above the landscape to the top of snow-covered Ben Nevis, the highest mountain in Great Britain. Maude Haydon later donated £5 to Agnes Goodsir for the care of wounded WWI soldiers recovering in her home.The sisters also visited Hayden relatives in Ireland, who took the ladies riding on a fox hunt.

== Personal life ==
Maude Haydon was a good friend of Noel Goodsir's son Norman, and they maintained a correspondence during his chaotic and violent WWI service in the Australian Imperial Forces Artillery in France. He was tragically murdered in London in 1919 and she never married. Maude Haydon spent her life living and working at Bloomfield homestead with the Haydon family. She maintained close relations with most of its many members, and was a prolific correspondent who kept them informed of the news of the family. After the death of her father in 1932, she arranged Christmas gatherings at Bloomfield that was attended by a crowd of family and friends from at least 2 States for over 40 years. During WWII she hosted soldiers' wives and children of the Upper Hunter to a wonderful Christmas dinner party.

Maude Haydon was a prominent social identity of the Upper Hunter. She was a bright personality, who was an excellent communicator despite her deafness and was very generous. She used to drive a cart pulled by 'Jolly' the horse around the district, delivering mail until the 1950s. After her mother died in 1942, she became the mistress of Bloomfield homestead and continued to keep an open-door house. Maude Haydon would collect guests from the Blandford Railway Station in a horse and sulky and later in a car, for over 50 years.

Maude Haydon died at 91 years of age on 9 January 1978 and was buried in Murrurundi Cemetery.
