= Maeve Woods =

Australian artist

Maeve Woods (November 13, 1932 - April 28, 2026) was an Australian artist based in Tasmania.

== Early life and education ==
Woods was born in Melbourne.

Following an international trip to London and Paris in the late 1940s, Woods began taking classes at the then National Gallery Schoolin Melbourne. Studying alongside friends, including Fred Williams, Lesley Lawson, and Rod Clark, Woods came under the tutelage of George Bell. Bell's emphasis on en plein air excursions and collaborations with others stayed with Woods, with some of this early word receiving prominence in the early 1950s, with patronage from leading Australian author Patrick White.

== Career ==
Working extensively from the early 1950s across a range of media, Woods keenly engaged in Melbourne's burgeoning experimental jazz scene, often employing techniques of improvisation and rhythm in their work.

Moving to Mittagong, New South Wales, in the late 1950s, Woods actively engaged with Sydney-based artists and musicians, later holding exhibitions in Barry Stearn's Paddington gallery in 1963. Throughout the mid-1960s through to the mid-1970s Woods traveled extensively throughout Australia and the world to undertake sessional teaching in Brisbane, Sydney and Melbourne. Wood held her first significant solo exhibition in 1970 at the Watters Gallery in the eastern suburbs of Sydney. Working across a broad range of abstract and architectural collages, Woods began employing postcards and found objects to construct unstable collages that evoked the work of Pontormo and Tintoretto.

Working across film and slides throughout the 1980s, Woods kept painting and collage close by, often exhibiting in Melbourne and Sydney.

Living in Victoria's Dandenong Ranges from 1988 to 1998, Woods continued to paint, using borrowed images and surfaces to explore the natural world around her. Since 1998 Woods has been living and working in Hobart, Tasmania, exhibiting works regularly throughout the 2000s and 2010s. Referring to their most recent work at the time, Woods said in 2013:

"My interest in the colour informs all the works and their titles. Hidden on the reverse side of the support, a frame gives strength but does not conceal the wild paper’s ragged edges. As the painting is slightly raised in advance of the wall, a shadow is cast and this peripheral fact can interact with after-images and other ephemera evoked by the paintings."

== Work ==
Woods has worked across every media, with particular success in painting, collage, and film. Retaining an interest in the surface since those early lessons with George Bell, much of Woods' work concerns itself with squares and frames. Often abstract, Woods has remained restless in their pursuit of different surface qualities in painting, collage, and cinema – often drawing on cinematic history ranging from Hitchcock to Bunuel. Their work is held in numerous state and national collections, including: Muswellbrook Regional Art Centre.

== Exhibitions ==
- Surface, curated by Sean Kelly. Carnegie Gallery, Hobart. 2012
- Maeve Woods: Recent paintings. Venues. Watters Gallery. (20 May 2009 – 13 June 2009)
