= Paji Honeychild Yankarr =

Australian Aboriginal artist

Paji Wajina Honeychild Yankarr (c. 1912 - 4 December 2004) was an Australian aboriginal artist.

Yankarr was born at Kuntumarrajarra in the Great Sandy Desert, and moved in the 1960s to Cherrabun; in the 1970s, she moved to an old mission near Junjuwa. There, Yankarr joined the Karrayili Adult Education Centre and started painting. She took part in a joint exhibition at the Tandanya National Aboriginal Cultural Institute in 1991 and painted throughout the 1990s. Yankarr has worked on paper and on canvas, and her work has been described as: "blatant records of her desert country with the recurring theme in her works being the Jila (waterhole) of various sites in the Great Sandy Desert".

Four of her works are in the collection of the National Gallery of Victoria.

In 2014, the ReDot Fine Art Gallery in Singapore held an exhibition "Kurntumarrajarra - The Estate of Paji Wajina Honeychild Yankarr", named after her birthplace.
