= Caroline Rothwell =

British-Australian sculptor

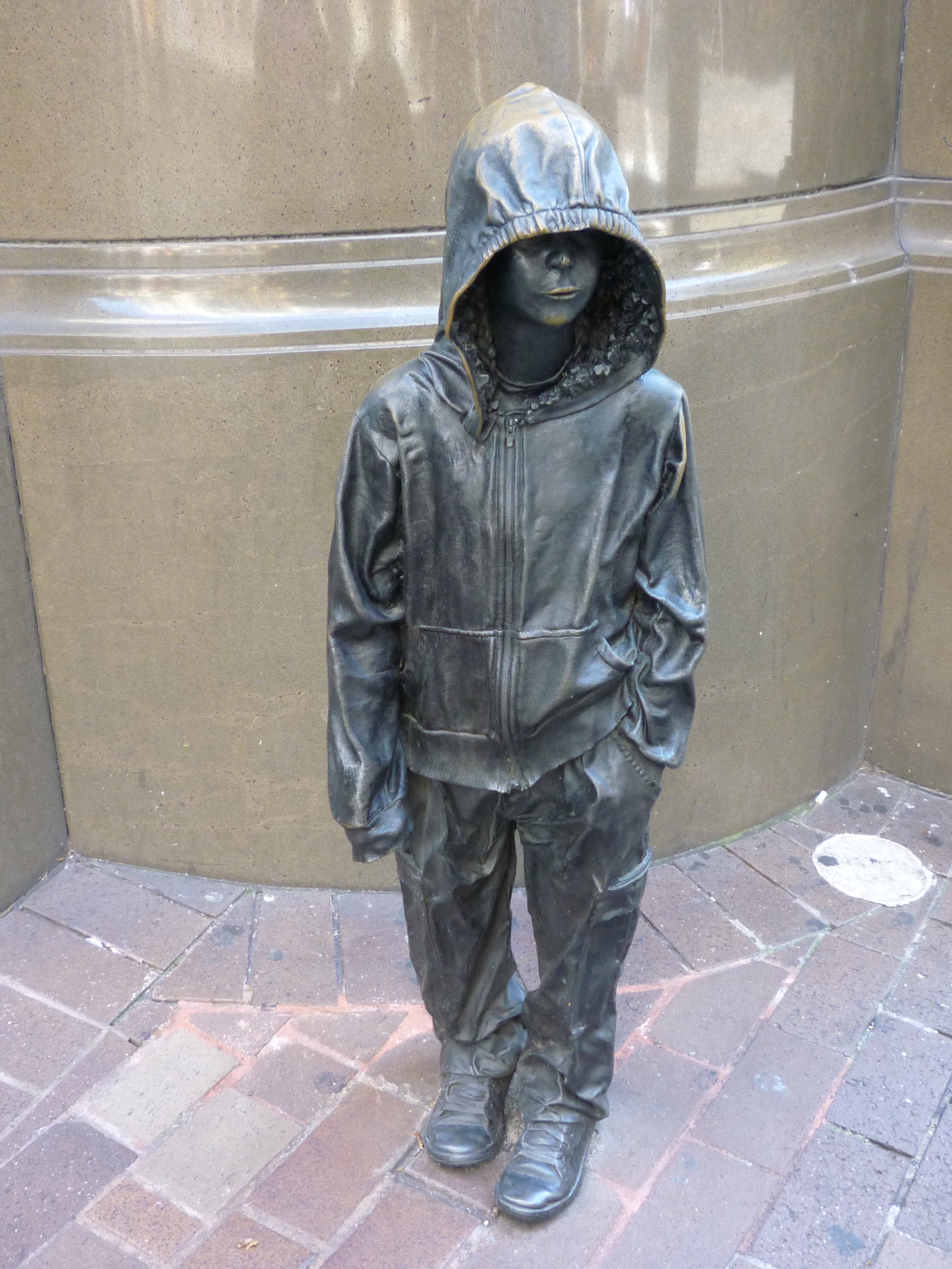
Youngsters (2012) by Rothwell, located in Barrack Street, Sydney

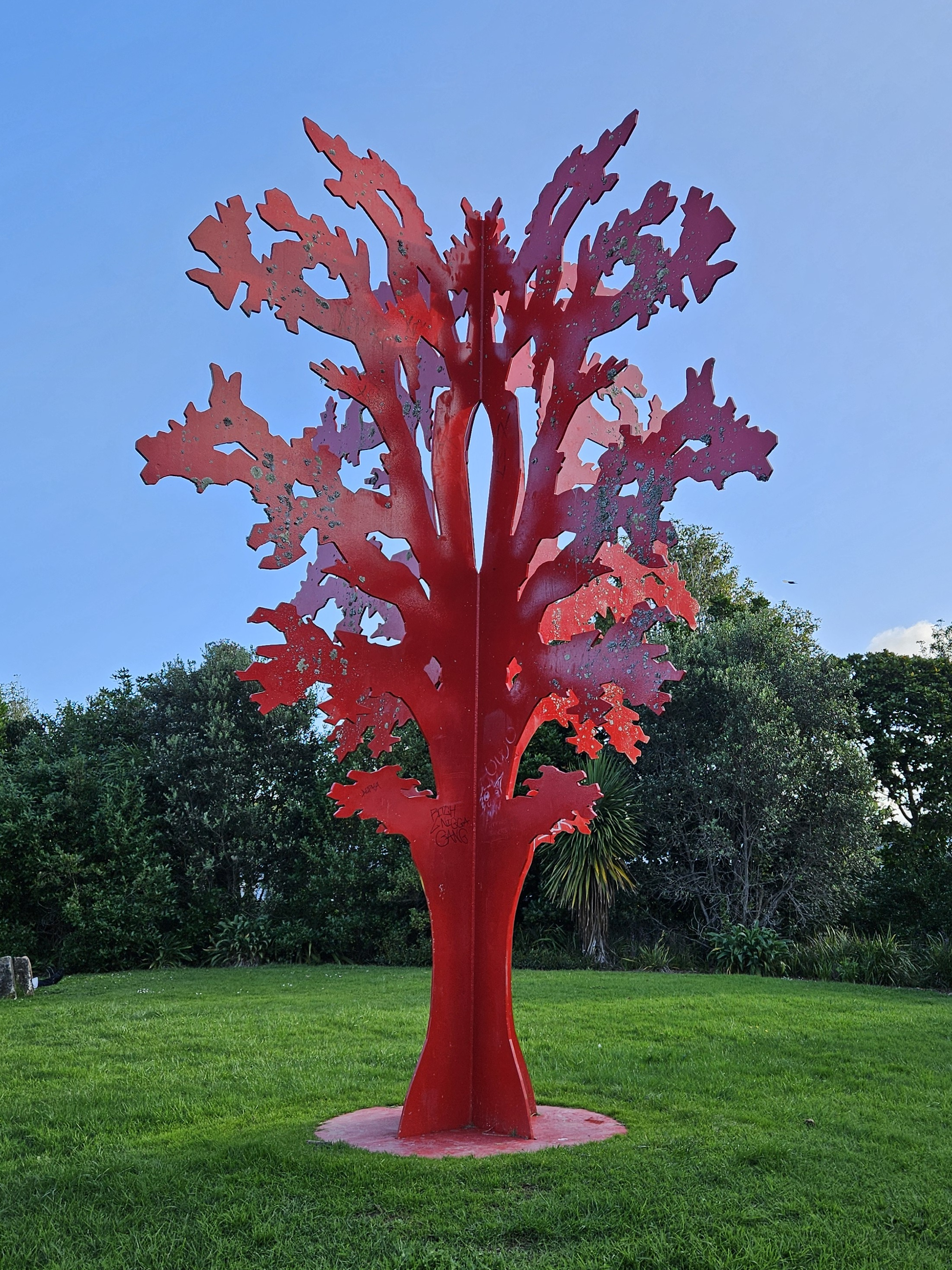
Tree (2003), located in Mount Albert, Auckland, New Zealand

Caroline Rothwell (born 1967, Hull, England) is an artist who works mainly within sculpture. She currently lives and works in Sydney, New South Wales, Australia. Rothwell's works have been exhibited (in both group and solo shows), collected, commissioned and publicly installed widely across Australia and internationally.

== Early life and education ==
Caroline Rothwell was born in Hull, England in 1967. She studied at the Wimbledon School of Art in London, England between 1989 and 1990 where she attained her Art Foundation Diploma. Rothwell then studied a Bachelor of Art (with Honours) with a focus on sculpture at the Camberwell College of Arts in London between 1990 and 1993. Between 1997 and 1998 she completed her Masters of Fine Arts, again with a focus on sculpture at Hunter College, City University of New York/Elam School of Fine Arts, University of Auckland. Rothwell then moved to Sydney, Australia, where she lives as of 2021.

== Art works ==
Rothwell's art works are mainly three dimensional art objects including sculptures and installations, but she her works also include more "flat" works including water colour paintings and drawings. Rothwell utilises both commonly and uncommonly used materials in her artworks.

Thematically, Rothwell's work focuses on human's interaction with the natural world. Her works often depict human figures as well as natural elements such as a wide range of animals such as horses, dogs, birds, mice, and plant subjects such as weeds, trees, flowers. Rothwell's work often depicts these forms in a somewhat abstract style with extra appendages and her figures are often mid-action and lively.

In 2003, Rothwell worked on the redevelopment of the Mount Albert War Memorial Reserve precinct in Auckland, New Zealand. She supplied three commissioned works: Tree, Harakeke Balustrade and Scoria Wall.

Her work appeared in Part 2 of the Know My Name exhibition of Australian women artists 2021-22 at the National Gallery of Australia.
