= Frances Cannon =

Australian artist (born 1992)

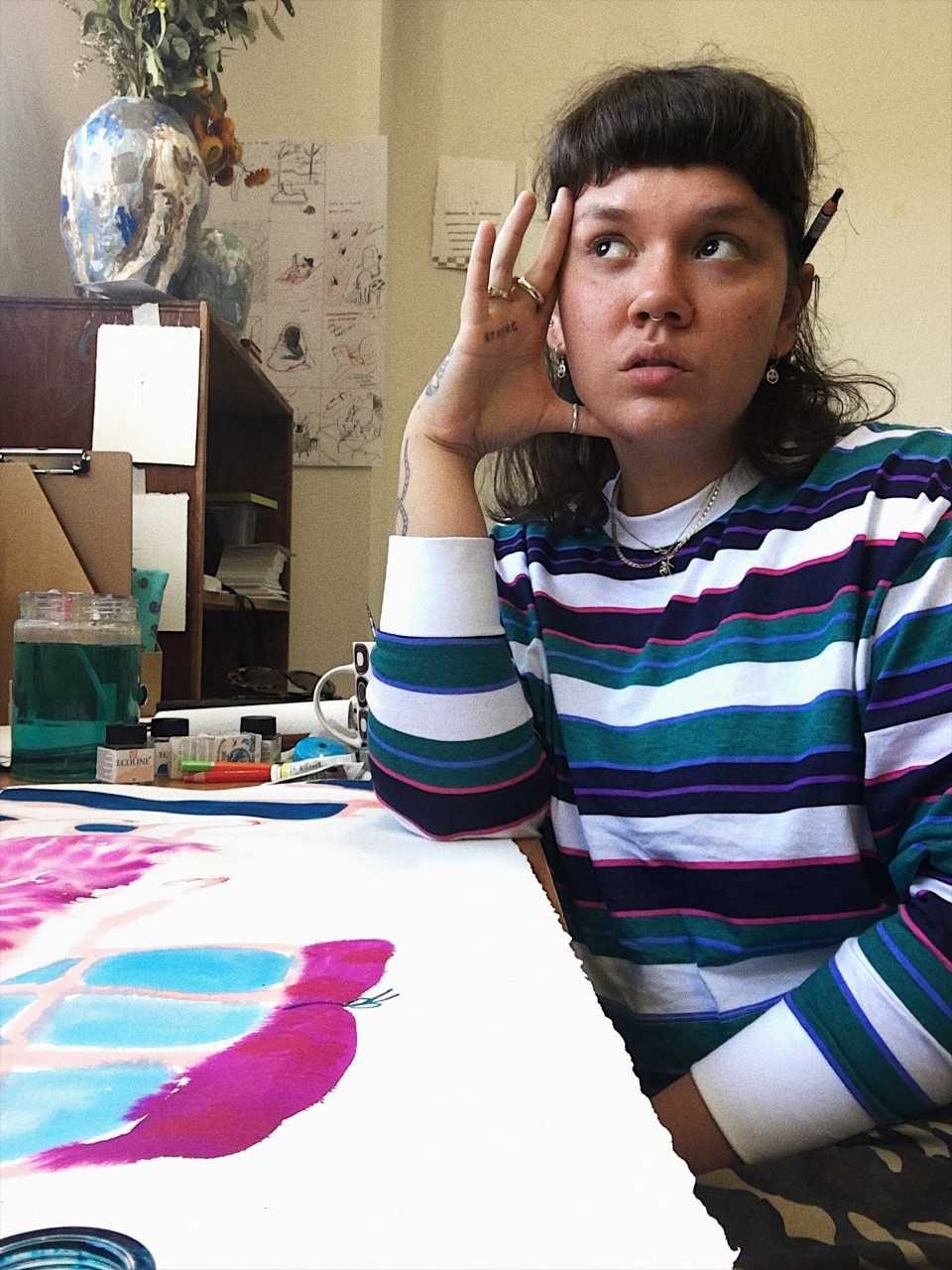
- The author in their studio, October 2018
- Website: francescannonart.com

Frances Cannon (born 15 September 1992) is a multidisciplinary queer artist and author located in Melbourne, Australia who works primarily with watercolour, gouache and ink. They are the founder of the "Self Love Club", a movement that pushes for inclusivity and self-acceptance. Feminism, self-love, sexuality, gender, sex, identity, and mental health are all important themes in Cannon's work.

Cannon describes their work as 'diaristic', examining what it means to be a woman in contemporary times through their own lens. Along with painting, Cannon has published a poetry book titled "I Hope You're Having Trouble Sleeping" and released their own line of T-shirts with their work on them. Cannon lists some of their artistic influences as Louise Bourgeois, David Shrigley, Quentin Blake, Marlene Dumas and Frida Kahlo.

== Biography ==
Frances Cannon was born on 15 September 1992 to Australian parents in rural Melbourne, Australia. Their family moved to Thailand in 1993 and Cannon spent much of their formative years living there, where they were educated through home-schooling, the Chairo Christian School, and the Grace International School.

Cannon moved to Melbourne, Australia in 2012 to pursue art, where they graduated from RMIT University with a Bachelor of Arts (Fine Art) with Distinction in 2015 and with a Bachelor of Arts (Fine Arts) with First Class Honours. Soon after, Cannon began solo and group exhibitions, along with custom work for print and online publications.

== Work ==
Cannon is mainly known for their drawings which consists mostly of simple, black and white line drawings. Of their drawings, Cannon said "...if there is something I really want to communicate that particular day, I will focus my mind on that topic or scene, and those drawings and paintings are my best. I still never plan the paintings though. I work immediately and fluidly."

For larger paintings, Cannon uses watercolour, gouache and ink on thick watercolour paper. The large ink paintings are ambiguous and watery, using large splashes and fluid washes of colour to complement their black line work. Similar in theme to her other works, Cannon's paintings revolve around the body and self. Cannon says that their work "feels the fullest when it involves both drawing and painting".

=== Books ===
Cannon illustrated Girlish, a book about intersectional feminism, by Alana Wulff in 2017.

Cannon has published two colouring books: one titled Ladies Lost in the Wilderness, and another in 2017 named Body Positive. In 2018, Cannon self-published a poetry book titled I Hope You're Having Trouble Sleeping

In 2017, Cannon self-published a zine titled "Self Love Club", inspired by their social media movement of the same name. It has 72 submissions from her followers who have obtained a Self Love Club tattoo. Also in 2017, Cannon published "Piss on the Patriarchy: A Very Serious Zine" for distribution as part of her stall at the Melbourne Zine Fair.

== Feminism ==
Cannon gives feminism as a major influence in their work. According to them, "Feminism means everyone getting the same chances in life." They went on to explain that feminism taught them "how to love myself and love my body, and that has influenced my work in such a huge way."

“I think my art and my feminism sustain each other. It sounds a bit weird, but I think that’s a big thing. Like, I’ll make a drawing and it’ll be really positive with a feminist message and I will learn from that. Sometimes I’ll make drawings without even properly thinking about it. Later, I’ll look at it and think, 'oh, I need to do that!' or 'I need to think that about myself.'"

=== Self Love Club ===
The Self Love Club is a movement inspired by a personal tattoo Frances Cannon has on their arm. It aims to promote positive body image, introspective love, and a general attention to the importance of self. The simple tattoo idea was posted onto Cannon's Instagram account, where they invited others to 'join the club'. The tattoos act as a "little symbol acknowledging self-worth". Cannon said that illustrating their self-love has inspired not only themselves, but so many other people.

== Exhibitions ==
=== Solo ===
- 2019/2 – Confirmed solo show at Brunswick Street Gallery
- 2018/1 – I Hope You’re Having Trouble Sleeping, Courthouse Youth Arts Centre, Geelong
- 2017/5 – Niceties, Tinning Street Gallery, Brunswick
- 2017/3 – Self Love Club Zine Launch and Exhibition, Enough Space Gallery, Prahran
- 2017/2 – Fluttering in Her Mind’s Eye, Junior Space Gallery, Fitzroy
- 2016/10 – Small but Not Insignificant, Yonder Art Space, Yarraville
- 2016/7 – Feeling Blue, Enough Space Gallery, Prahran
- 2015/10 – Paper Queens, First Site Gallery, Melbourne
- 2015/5 – Window Drawings, PS50 Gallery, Melbourne
- 2015/3 – Colour Culture, PS50 Gallery, Melbourne

=== Group exhibitions ===
- 2018/6 – Nature As She, Off The Kerb Gallery, Collingwood
- 2017/8 – Feeling Into, Brunswick Street Gallery, Fitzroy
- 2017/8 – Comfort Zone, Toast Workroom, Brunswick
- 2017/7 – Valid, Neon Parlour Gallery and Studios, Melbourne
- 2017/2 – Summer ‘40 Exhibition, Rubicon ARI, Melbourne
- 2016/12 – Mine, Fort Delta, Melbourne
- 2016/11 – Think Pink, Enough Space, Prahran
- 2016/10 – A Confident Girl, Columbus Hotel, Monaco
- 2016/8 – Eat Me: A Cunnilingus Themed Art Show, Junior High Gallery, Los Angeles, California
- 2016/6 – The Gentle Void, The Gentle Void Gallery, Hobart
- 2016/5 – Accidental Discharge Presents: ALL, Neon Parlour Gallery and Studios, Melbourne
- 2016/1 – Shark Week, Enough Space Gallery, Prahran
- 2015/11 – RMIT Graduate Show, RMIT University, Melbourne
- 2015/9 – Feck (Erotic Art Exhibition), Melbourne
- 2015/9 – R U OK Exhibition, Melbourne
- 2015/5 – Achromatopsia, The Good Copy, Collingwood
- 2014 – Floor’d, RMIT Building 2 Level 4 Tutorial Room, Melbourne
- 2012 – Refresh, Chiang Mai International School, Chiang Mai, Thailand
- 2011 – Untitled Exhibition at Chiang Mai Café, Chiang Mai, Thailand
- 2011 – Grace International School Art Show, Chiang Mai, Thailand
