= Agnes Barker =

Australian artist (1907–2008)

Agnes Frances Amelia Richardson (née Barker) (16 January 1907 – 25 April 2008) was an Australian potter and craftworker. She was an active member of the early Brisbane arts scene, and exhibited extensively throughout the 1920s and 1930s. Examples of her work are currently held at the Queensland Art Gallery | Gallery of Modern Art.

== Early life and education ==
Barker was born on 16 January 1907 in Melbourne, Australia. Her older sister was prominent artist and teacher Caroline Barker. In 1920, Barker moved with her family to Brisbane and attended Somerville House. In 1925, she enrolled in the Central Technical College (CTC). She studied modelling under L. J. Harvey and painting under F. J. Martyn Roberts. Harvey motivated Barker to take up sculpture and, with his permission, she would often stay late to continue working at the CTC.

By the end of the 1920s, Harvey felt he had taught Barker to the limit of his abilities. Although she could have continued her studies in Sydney, her severe asthma and lack of finances prevented her from going.

== Career ==
Barker exhibited extensively throughout the early twentieth century. She exhibited pottery with the Queensland Royal National Agricultural and Industrial Association in 1927–33, the Royal Queensland Art Society in 1929–32, and the Arts and Crafts Society of Queensland in 1930–31. In 1931, she received first prize at the Royal National Exhibition for a hand-built earthenware bowl.

In the early 1930s, Barker took a break from pottery and started producing hand-painted brooches from her home in Norman Park. Her brooches sold so well at the Finney, Isles & Co. department store that Barker was able to fund a trip to England in 1931. Upon her return, she established a studio called Novelart. She bought a small printing press and guillotine, creating illustrative works that were successfully marketed to Sydney and Melbourne. Although she also purchased an electric kiln, she soon sold it to fellow artist Marjory Clark.

In World War II, Barker taught leatherwork at the Enoggera Skin Hospital. She also started a project called The Cavalcade of Toys, in which she created toys of fairytale characters out of leather scraps. The toys were shown at Carnegie's in Queen Street and Brisbane City Hall, with proceeds going to the Red Cross and the Union Jack Club.

In the late 1940s, Barker opened a craft shop at her sister's studio in George Street. She soon gave up the store however, after marrying Harold Richardson in 1953.

== Later life and death ==
In the 1960s, Barker made over fifty television appearances on arts and crafts programmes. She also experimented with bark painting and Chinese painting. Barker retired to Coorparoo, Queensland, dying on 25 April 2008.
