= Nerine Martini =

Australian sculptor (1968–2019)

- Born: Nerine Yvette Addison; 24 March 1968; Perth, Western Australia
- Died: | death_date = April 25, 2019 (aged 51); Sydney, Australia
- Occupations: Artist and art lecturer
- Known for: Sculpture, public art, installation and works on paper
- Children: 1
- Website: nerinemartini.com

Nerine Martini (24 March 1968 – 25 April 2019), was an Australian artist working in the fields of sculpture, installation, drawing, socially engaged art and public art.

"Leaving a legacy of public artworks and community inspired projects, Nerine Martini was an artist who tapped in universal themes of migration and belonging. Martini had an interest in working cross-culturally and creating artworks that respond to stories of migration, belonging, displacement, cultural identity and home. Interweaving personal and universal threads, her work poetically expressed concerns for humanity and our shared social and natural environments."

== Career ==
Martini’s work has been included in major exhibitions including Sculpture by the Sea, the Blake Prize and the Helen Lempriere National Sculpture Awards. Her work is held in collections such as Artbank Australia, artsACT, University of Sydney, College of Fine Arts, UNSW and the Seidler Collection. Martini taught fine arts at Nepean Art & Design Centre, and lectured in sculpture and object design at the Australian Catholic University.

== Awards and honours ==
- 2014 Emerging Artist’s Award, Sculpture at Sawmillers
- 2008 Popular Choice Award, Helen Lempriere National Sculpture Award
- 2000 COFA Alumni Acquisitive Prize
- 2000 Honorable Mention, Sculpture by the Sea
- 1999 First Prize, Katoomba Art Street Prize, Blue Mountains City Council, NSW

== Solo exhibitions ==
- 2018 Precarious, M Contemporary, Woollarah, Sydney
- 2016 Unravel, AirSpace Projects, Marrickville, Sydney
- 2012 Traces, Incinerator Art Space, Willoughby, Sydney
- 2006 Life Boat / Thuyen Cuu Roi, Museum of Ethnology, Hanoi, Vietnam
- 2002 Telling Stories, Wentworth Falls School of Art, Blue Mountains, NSW
- 1998 Linger, Kidogo Arthouse, Fremantle, Western Australia
- 1997 Swarm, mAudespAce, Sydney
- 1995 Dream of Black Dogs, aGOG, Canberra
- 1995 Recent Work, mAudespAce, Sydney
- 1992 Vision and Dreaming, Tamworth City Gallery, Tamworth NSW

== Education ==
- 2016 – 2018 PhD candidate University of Sydney (Suspended due to ill health)
- 2007 Master of Fine Art, Sculpture (Research), College of Fine Arts, UNSW
- 1997 Master of Art, Sculpture (Coursework), College of Fine Arts, UNSW
- 1988 Diploma of Fine Art, Sculpture, Claremont School of Art, Perth
