= Niah McLeod =

Indigenous Australian artist

- Born: 1991 (age 34–35); Nowra, New South Wales, Australia
- Father: Bobby McLeod

Niah Juella McLeod (born 1991) is an Indigenous Australian contemporary artist.

== Early life ==
McLeod was born in Nowra, New South Wales. Her mother was 19 at the time, and raised her on her own. She is the daughter of Yuin Elder Bobby McLeod. At age two, McLeod moved with her mother and brother, Zac, to Bangalow, where she grew up.

== Art career ==
McLeod was first exposed to art by her mother, who enjoyed painting. While in school, McLeod performed poorly in art classes. As an adult, she realized that although she disliked painting still lifes, she enjoyed making abstract art. She describes her artistic practice as "meditative," which is also a state she aims to evoke in viewers.

McLeod has had solo exhibitions in the China Heights Gallery, Kate Owen Gallery, and the Ninbella Gallery.

In 2020, she was awarded creative artist of the year by the Byron Shire Council.

In addition to her work in the fine arts, McLeod had undertaken multiple commercial collaborations. She has designed homewares for the brand Koala, commissions for Tiffany & Co, and guitars for Fender.

== Personal life ==
McLeod is a member of the Monero, Wandandian, and Yuin people. She lives in Bangalow with her partner and their two children.
