= Sophie Steffanoni =

Australian artist (1873–1906)

Sophie (Sophia) Elizabeth Steffanoni
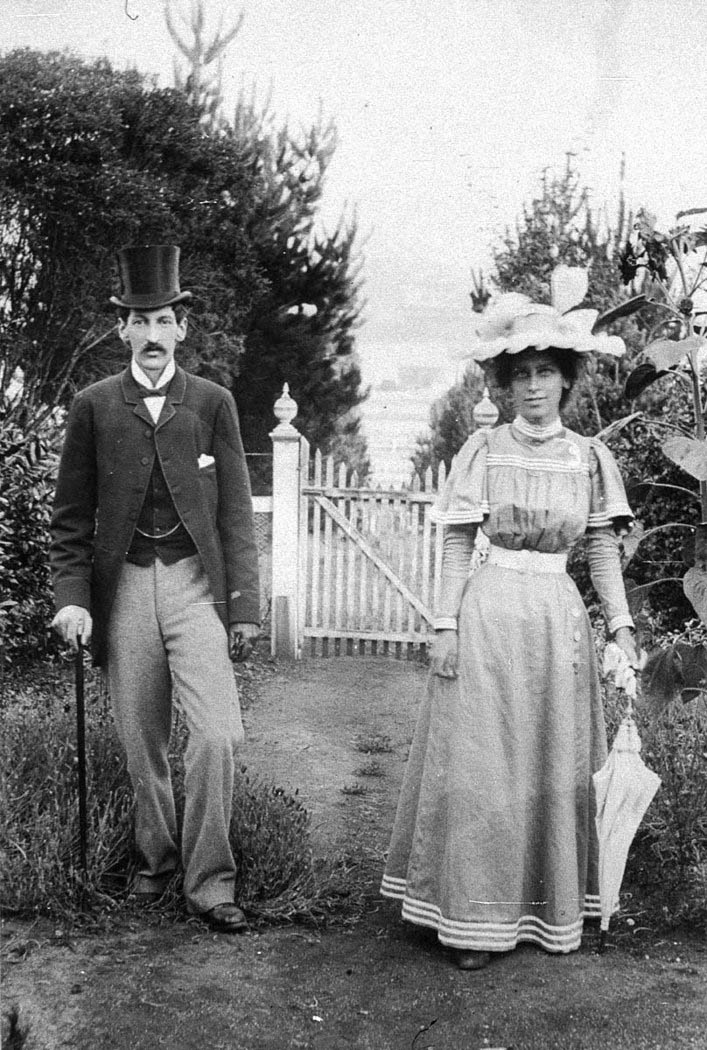
- Sophie Elizabeth Steffanon arriving at a tea party at the Jones' house, Dapto, New South Wales, 1898, by A.C. Cowle
- Born: 8 May 1873; Pitt Street, Sydney, Australia
- Died: 1 November 1906 (aged 33); 15 Riley Street, North Shore, Sydney, Australia
- Occupation: Artist
- Parent: (Father) Lewis Steffanoni (Mother) Sarah Ann Steffanoni (nee Reading)

Sophie (Sophia) Elizabeth Steffanoni (1873–1906) was an Australian born artist who produced works in the style of the Heidelberg School art movement, also known as Australian impressionism.

== Life ==
Sophie Elizabeth Steffanoni (1873–1906) was the daughter of Lewis Steffanoni, who was born in 1835 at Holborn, London. Lewis worked in the family business as an upholsterer and gold bullion embroidery artist before migrating to Australia. He arrived in Sydney on 9 November 1852.

In 1869, Lewis married Sarah Ann Reading (1844-1916) who was the niece of John Fairfax and formed a company with Sarah's mother Reading, Son & Steffanoni. This company produced regalia, flags, badges, vestments and uniforms as well as illuminated addresses. When Lewis died of epilepsy 29 May 1880, Sarah took over the business.

Sophie Elizabeth Steffanoni was born in Pitt Street, Sydney 8 May 1873. She was the third of five children and went to Fort Street model school and Sydney Girls’ High School in 1887–88. She joined the family business as an embroiderer and her work was exhibited at the 1886 Colonial and Indian Exhibition in London.

Sometime around 1891, she began attending the Art Society School when Tom Roberts was a tutor and was a private student of W. Lister Lister. She was also taught by Miss Zaheleros. In 1891 she won a prize for water-colour painting at the National Juvenile Industrial Exhibition and at the World's Columbian Exhibition in 1893, she won a medal for an embroidered Australian Coat of Arms in gold bullion.

From 1895 to 1903, Steffanoni's paintings appeared regularly in the annual exhibitions of the Royal Art Society of New South Wales. On a trip to Tasmania, she painted with Kate Cowle and produced the work The Sea-birds' Home, which was exhibited in the Royal Art Society of New South Wales Annual Exhibition, 1898.

In 1903, her oil works appeared in a two-page pictorial spread in The Sydney Mail and New South Wales Advertiser where they were singled out for being in good style and taste.

In the early 1900s, she suffered from ill-health and died at her home at 15 Riley Street, North Shore, Sydney on 1 November 1906.

== Exhibited works ==
- A Ferry Boat, Royal Art Society of New South Wales Annual Exhibition. 18th, 1888
- A Glimpse of Kanimbula Valley, Royal Art Society of New South Wales Annual Exhibition. 18th, 1888
- A Rich Harvest, Royal Art Society of New South Wales Annual Exhibition. 16th, 1895
- Waning Day, Royal Art Society of New South Wales Annual Exhibition. 16th, 1895
- The Old Barn, Royal Art Society of New South Wales Annual Exhibition. 16th, 1895
- The Orchard Gate, Royal Art Society of New South Wales Annual Exhibition. 16th, 1895
- Sketch - Neutral Bay, Royal Art Society of New South Wales Annual Exhibition. 16th, 1895
- Beached, Royal Art Society of New South Wales Annual Exhibition. 19th, 1898
- Harvest Time - Thrashing, Royal Art Society of New South Wales Annual Exhibition. 19th, 1898
- Soft Murmurings of the Sea, Royal Art Society of New South Wales Annual Exhibition. 19th, 1898
- The Garden of Sleep, Royal Art Society of New South Wales Annual Exhibition. 19th, 1898
- The Sea-birds' Home, Tasmania, Royal Art Society of New South Wales Annual Exhibition. 19th, 1898
- Down the Gully, Bundanoon, Royal Art Society of New South Wales Annual Exhibition. 20th, 1899
- In Sweet September, Royal Art Society of New South Wales Annual Exhibition. 20th, 1899
- Crossing the Harbour, Royal Art Society of New South Wales Annual Exhibition. 21st, 1900
