= Johanna Weigel =

Australian paper-pattern manufacturer (1847–1940)

Johanna Wilhelmine Weigel
- Born: 11 February 1847; Posen, Prussia
- Died: 10 January 1940 (aged 92)

Johanna Wilhelmine Weigel, née Astmann (11 February 1847 – 10 January 1940), known professionally as Madame Weigel, was a designer and publisher of dressmaking patterns in Australia.

== Biography ==
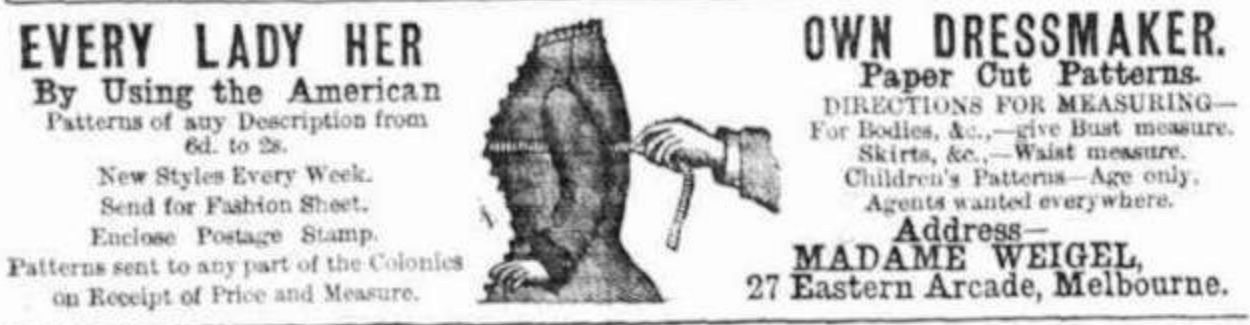
1878 advertisement for Madame Weigel's paper patterns

A knitting pattern magazine from the 1930s

Weigel was born on 11 February 1847 in Posen, Prussia (present-day Poznań, Poland). She was the second of five children born to August Astmann and his wife Emilie, née Sachs. She left for New York as a young girl, and became a designer for McCall's Patterns, where she met and married engineer Oscar Weigel (c. 1844 – 7 February 1915), born in Brunswick, Germany. They left for Australia aboard Mysore, arriving in Melbourne on 4 March 1877.

According to Weigel, she and her husband were in Australia on an extended honeymoon when she started cutting paper patterns for Melbourne friends who admired her dress sense. Within a year, with the help of a few staff in a small house in Fitzroy, she was producing patterns and marketing them mail-order as "American Paper Cut Patterns" from premises in Eastern Arcade, Melbourne, and soliciting for "agents everywhere".

In 1880 she began publishing a monthly "Weigel's Journal of Fashions", edited by her accountant, Mrs Thompson, touted as the first to be all-Australian in content, production and printing, combining general information, stories and information about merchandise, with illustrated descriptions of the latest English and American fashions, adapted for Colonial conditions. Later that year the magazine was also being published in Sydney, and she had a retail establishment at 313 Pitt Street.

Around 1885 she built offices and a factory at 229 Lennox Street (the Rowena Street corner), Richmond where they printed the tissue-paper patterns on their own machines. Her husband Oscar's magazine production team adopted photoengraving for Phil Ashley's artwork and installed a monotype press. A free pattern was included with each issue.

In 1893 Oscar was naturalized, hence also was Johanna.

Weigel retired from active involvement in the business sometime around 1910, and spent much of her time in world travel. Oscar died in 1915 in Los Angeles, where the couple had gone either on business or on a sentimental journey. By this time, the business was selling over a million patterns a year. After Oscar's death, Johanna returned to Melbourne, and lived for some time in St Kilda. In 1926 Madame Weigel Pty. Ltd., was founded with partners Weigel, Charles Reynolds (a machinist who had been with Weigel from the early days), and George Humphries, with a capital of £10,000.

She died in 1940 at her suite in the Oriental Hotel, Collins Street, the Melbourne address of Johanna and her companion Sarah Neilson for the last twelve years of her life. Her estate, valued at £71,844 was divided between five Melbourne hospitals, after her employees had been looked after, and with £20,000 set aside to fund the Oscar Weigel Exhibitions (i.e. scholarship) for engineering students at the University of Melbourne.
