= Vicki Varvaressos =

Australian artist

- Born: 1949 (age 76–77); Sydney
- Education: National Art School
- Style: figurative expressionist painter

Vicki Varvaressos is an Australian contemporary figurative expressionist painter. Sometimes referred to as a "transitional artist", her painting style and subject matter has evolved throughout her career. Many of her works are of women and their experiences in Australia.

== Biography ==
Born in Sydney, Australia in 1949, Varvaressos studied at the National Art School in Sydney from 1968 to 1971 at the East Sydney Technical College. Her paintings throughout the following decade gave expression to the feminist concerns of the 1970s especially the representation of women in the media. She travelled extensively throughout Europe in 1978. In later years, her subject matter shifted towards reflecting a more personal experience. Varvaressos currently lives and works in Sydney.

== Early work ==
Varvaressos's first exhibition was held at Watters Gallery in Sydney in 1975, a gallery at which she would continue to show regularly until its closure in 2018. The first exhibition was well-received by critics, Daniel Thomas listing her among the best of the "New Australian Faces of 1975". By 1978 she was being characterised as "a Sydneysider and heir to that city's tradition of funky, pop influenced art"—funk and pop being particularly identified with the Watters’ stable of artists. However, more commonly her work of this period—consistently figurative—was described as "expressionist". For example the critic Nancy Borlase wrote of her first exhibition that in "raw expressionist paintings … recognisable types, paragons of virtue or nastiness are brought to life in vivid slashes of fauve color, sometimes with devastating accuracy". Of an exhibition in 1978, W. E. Pidgeon would describe the "energetic combinations of brushwork, splashes, drips, broad strokes of cancellation (check) and jangling color schemes" as reflecting "the agitation and dissonances of our febrile age". This “agitation and dissonance” was seemingly meant to represent the type of political protest characteristic of the 70s, with which many Watters artists, including Varvaressos, were identified via the imagery in their work. Later, she would describe this period. "I was very involved in resident action and feminism. It was 1975, it was the time of our 'Bloodless Coup', they call it the dismissal, and that was reflected in the works that I was painting".

In a survey of art by Australian women in the 1970s, Janine Burke, while continuing the expressionist theme, would be more specific as to the nature of the political content of Varvaressos's work from that period. Taking up the common theme of an “anger” animating her painting and responsible for its “vitality”, Burke did not see this directed at people (as had Borlase and Pidgeon) but “primarily against the false and foolish images, mostly of women, that the media spew out, that assault an audience that has been so pacified and bedazzled it will swallow whatever iniquity is thrust down its (largely unprotesting) throat. … Varvaressos reveals the ugly reality behind the beautiful fantasy of the advertising image—and the potential violence that lurks within it”.

By the early 1980s, critics were noticing subtle changes in Varvaressos's paintings, however. Thus Sandra McGrath would describe an exhibition as containing “a group of paintings in which bitter, satiric impressions of political figures (Doug Anthony and Malcolm Fraser) share the wall space with a brilliantly beautiful still-life with pears, a portrait of gallery owner Geoffrey Legge and a splendid double portrait of Thea Proctor and Maggie Preston taking tea”. In 1987, Bruce Adams noted that “her figurative art now focuses on a more severe and emblematic way on its formal ingredients and pictorial construction” and her “critical observation of social ways” had achieved a “more cool and introspective, formally reductive manner”. In 1990, Janine Burke would observe that “it is hard to think of another young Australian artist who handles with such assurance the gap between painterly abstraction and figuration”. In 1992, Geoffrey Legge of Watters Gallery would comment that the content of her work had “slipped from political corruption and patent and covert examples of social manipulation … onto observation of human nature: love, fear, dependency; the many ways we communicate or avoid communicating with one another”. By the 1990s, Varvaressos was alternating exhibitions of entirely of abstract works with ones made up of figurative work, but now done in a minimal way without identifiable characters.

== Later work ==
In her work from the past two decades, her paintings evolved from figurative to highly abstracted forms. Her subject matter drew from her own emotional responses to everyday events. Her paintings employ a "murky" colour palette, which adds to the crudeness of her work, and her aesthetic is drawn from the inconsistencies of her life. Her paintings are formed from her head and can only be viewed wholly as an image once completed.

“Now that her art has evolved, keeping calm and ‘just’ painting is more of a concern and ‘the content has become much more internal’” - Maitland Regional Art Gallery Cultural Director: Joe Eisenberg OAM

Varvaressos is represented in the collections of NGA, NGV, Artbank, AGNSW, Cruthers Collection of Women's Art, University of NSW, Wollongong Art Gallery, University of Tasmania, CBUS Collection, Gold Coast Collection and private collections in the UK, Europe, USA and Australia.

== Major exhibitions ==
=== Retrospectives ===
- 2014–2015. Vicki Varvaressos: The Story So Far (paintings 1975–2013), Maitland Regional Art Gallery, Maitland N.S.W.
- 2018. Vicki Varvaressos: Painting in the Same Language — A Different Vocabulary, Shoalhaven Regional Gallery, Nowra, N.S.W.

=== Group exhibitions ===
- 1981. Australian Perspecta, Art Gallery of N.S.W.
- 1982. Australian Painting and Sculpture 1956–1981, Art Gallery of N.S.W.
- 1984. Private Symbol: Social Metaphor, The 5th Biennale of Sydney, Art Gallery of N.S.W.
- 1985. Australian Perspecta, Art Gallery of N.S.W.
- 1987. Art in Architecture: Selections from the New Parliament House Collection, Canberra Contemporary Art Space.
- 1988. Bicentennial Print Folio, Australian National Gallery, Canberra.
- 1997. A Face in the Crowd, National Portrait Gallery, Canberra.
- 2002. Portia Geach Memorial Award (winner), S. H. Irvin Gallery, Sydney; Contemporary Australian Portraits, National Portrait Gallery, Canberra.
- 2021. Archie 100: A Century of the Archibald Prize, Art Gallery of N.S.W.

=== Solo exhibitions ===
- 1975–2017. Paintings, Drawings, Prints. Watters Gallery, Sydney.
- 1986–1998, Paintings, Niagara Gallery, Melbourne.
