= Sophia Tolli =

Australian fashion designer

Sophia Tolli is an Australian fashion designer specializing in wedding and special occasion gowns.

== Early years ==
Sophia Tolli was born Sophia Apostolides in Australia. Tolli's beginnings in the fashion industry stemmed from her aunt, a gifted dressmaker. Tolli selected the fabrics for the clothes that her aunt would create, giving her an opportunity to develop a keen eye for styles, colors, and more. A seamstress since her early teens, Tolli began making custom prom, bridesmaids and bridal gowns from a young age. She continued her studies in design during college.

== Career ==
After 10 years as head designer at Maggie Sottero, Tolli collaborated with Mon Cheri to design her own line in 2006. Her designs include strapless ball gowns, A-line dresses, halters and slim skirts. Her gowns are known for the impeccable fit, as well as draped and corset backs. Tolli enjoys naming her gowns after pop culture trends at the time; two of her most recent collections are named after characters from The Hunger Games and Game of Thrones.

Tolli later launched a Special Occasion collection of cocktail dresses with Mon Cheri for bridesmaids, young mothers, homecomings and prom.

Tolli's designs have been featured on the cover of Wedding Ideas Magazine.

== Awards and honours ==
In 2010, Sophia Tolli gown Y2954 won Wedding Dress of the Year at the Harrogate Bridal Buyer Awards.
