= Betty Temple Watts =

Australian scientific illustrator (1901–1992)

- Born: 1901
- Died: 1992 (aged 90–91)
- Known for: Scientific illustrations

Betty Temple Watts (1901–1992) was an Australian scientific illustrator who was employed to provide watercolour paintings of birds for several works published by the Commonwealth Scientific and Industrial Research Organisation (CSIRO). She began her training in art during her youth, but her first work was not published until 1952. She was introduced to scientists in Canberra, and she moved to the capital in 1958. Her publications include:

- Birds in the Australian high country (1969, 2nd ed. 1984)
- Pigeons and doves of Australia (1982)

Both works were edited by the CSIRO chief Harry Frith. Some of Temple Watts' works are held at the National Library of Australia. Her illustrations for Diurnal birds of prey (1960) are noted for the incorporation of biological aspects of raptors, in the act of hunting or reproduction, and figured with typical postures and in flight.

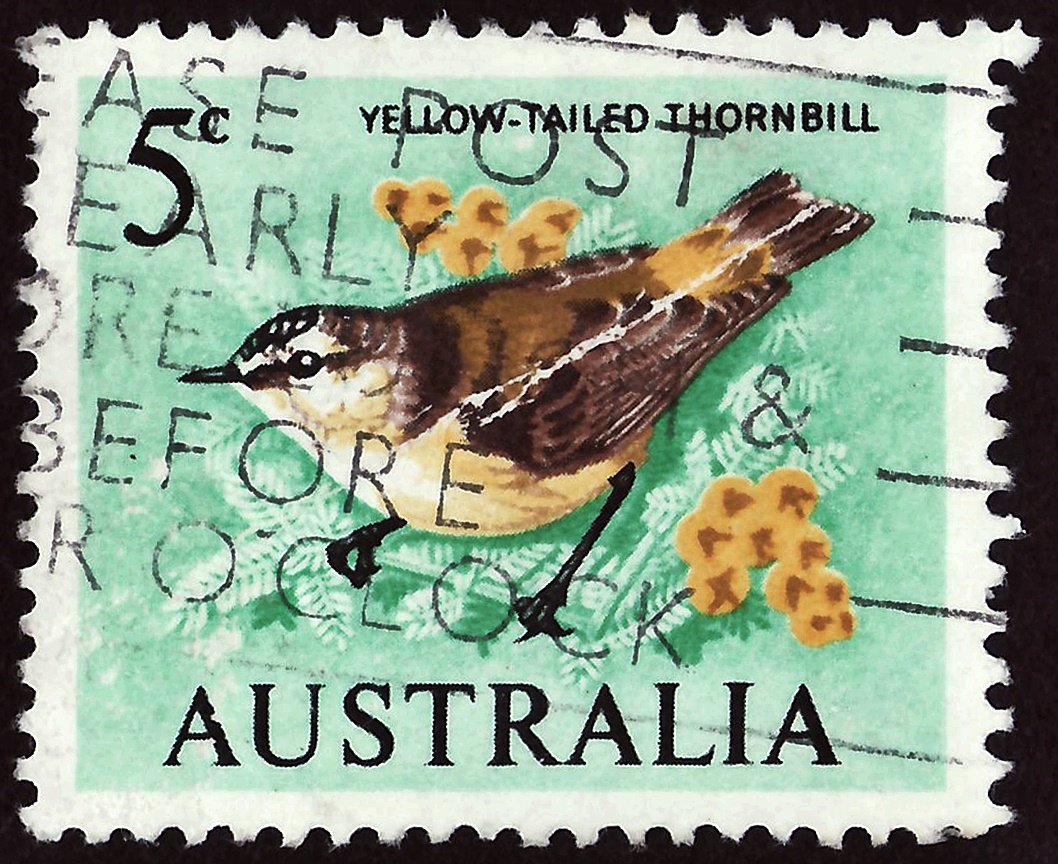
1966 stamp of Australia of the Yellow-rumped Thornbill Acanthiza chrysorrhoa) by Betty Temple Watts

In 1965 she designed new three postage stamps in decimal currency – 6¢ blue-faced honeyeater, 13¢ avocet and 24¢ kingfisher. Five of her earlier designs were adapted for decimal currency – 5¢ yellow-tailed thornbill, 15¢ galah, 20¢ golden whistler, 25¢ scarlet robin and 30¢ straw-necked ibis.

Her life and works are the subject of a book.
