= Linda Marrinon =

Australian artist

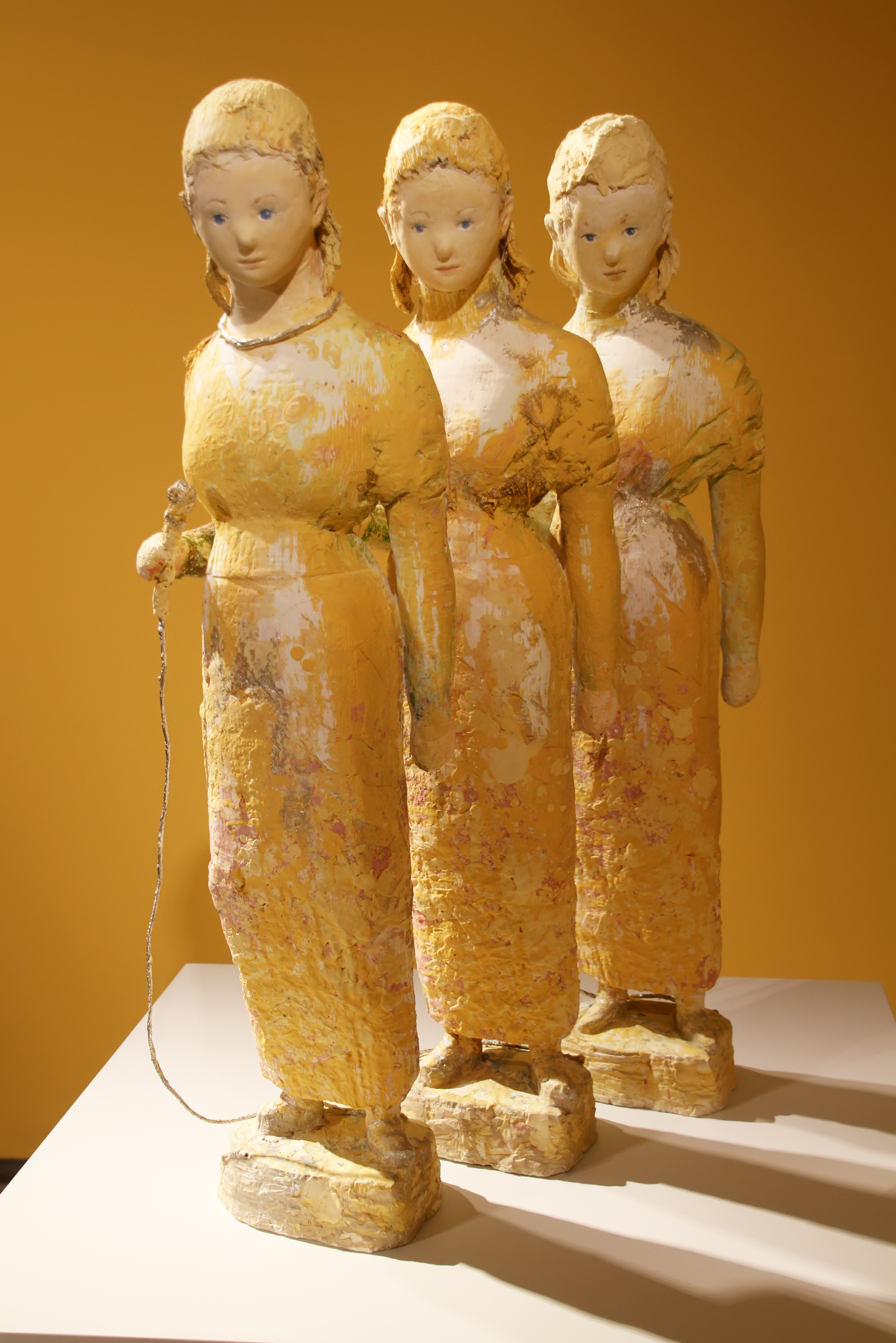
Moir Sisters (1974) in Museum of Contemporary Art Australia

Linda Marrinon (born 1959) is a Melbourne-based visual artist whose practice includes painting and sculpture. Marrinon's early work was as a painter but since 2006 she has worked primarily on figurative sculpture.

Marrinon's work has been exhibited in major Australian state and national public collections, and university, corporate and private collections. Her work is included in state collections in Australia including Art Gallery of New South Wales, Art Gallery of South Australia, Art Gallery of Western Australia, the National Gallery of Australia, National Gallery of Victoria, Queensland Art Gallery and the Gallery of Modern Art, Brisbane.
