= List of Indigenous Australian artists =

Numerous Indigenous Australians are noted for their participation in, and contributions to, the Visual arts of Australia and abroad. Contemporary Indigenous Australian art is a national movement of international significance with work by Indigenous artists, including paintings by those from the Western Desert, achieving widespread critical acclaim.

Because naming conventions for Indigenous Australians vary widely, this list is ordered by first name rather than surname.

== List ==
- Ada Andy Napaltjarri
- Albert Namatjira
- Alison Milyika Carroll
- Alma Nungarrayi Granites (1955–2017), artist
- Anatjari Tjakamarra
- Angelina Pwerle
- Anniebell Marrngamarrnga
- Archie Moore
- Banduk Marika
- Barbara McGrady
- Barbara Weir
- Betty Muffler
- Biddy Rockman Napaljarri
- Bill Yidumduma Harney
- Bill Whiskey Tjapaltjarri
- Billy Benn Perrurle
- Billy Stockman Tjapaltjarri
- Billy Tjampitjinpa Kenda
- Bronwyn Bancroft
- Brook Andrew
- Cassidy Possum Tjapaltjarri
- Charmaine Green
- Cheryl Moggs
- Christian Thompson
- Clifford Possum Tjapaltjarri
- Curly Bardkadubbu
- Daisy Jugadai Napaltjarri
- Danie Mellor
- Daniel Boyd
- Darby Jampijinpa Ross
- Darren Siwes
- David Malangi
- David Miller
- Dhambit Mununggurr
- Dhuwarrwarr Marika
- Dick Roughsey
- Digby Moran
- Dorothy Djukulul
- Dorothy Napangardi
- Eileen Napaltjarri
- Emily Kame Kngwarreye
- Fiona Foley
- Freddy Timms
- Gabriel Maralngurra
- Galuma Maymuru
- Gavin Wanganeen
- Gertie Huddleston
- Gloria Petyarre
- Gordon Bennett
- Graham Badari
- Harold Thomas
- Helen Nelson Napaljarri
- Helicopter Tjungurrayi
- Ian Abdulla
- Jack Dale Mengenen
- Jackie Kurltjunyintja Giles
- Jean Baptiste Apuatimi
- Jennifer Herd
- Jimmy Pike Kurnti Kujarri
- John Mawurndjul
- John Moriarty
- Johnny Bulunbulun
- Josepha (Josie) Petrick Kemarre
- Judy Watson
- Judy Watson Napangardi
- Juju Wilson
- Karla Dickens
- Kathleen Kemarre Wallace
- Kathleen Ngale
- Kathleen Petyarre
- Katie West
- Kay Lindjuwanga
- Kitty Pultara Napaljarri
- Leah King-Smith
- Lena Yarinkura
- Lily Kelly Napangardi
- Lin Onus
- Linda Syddick Napaltjarri
- Lisa Bellear
- Lorraine Connelly-Northey
- Louisa Napaljarri
- Lucy Napaljarri Kennedy
- Mabel Juli
- Maggie Napaljarri Ross
- Makinti Napanangka
- Malaluba Gumana
- Margaret Scobie
- Maria Josette Orsto
- Mavis Ngallametta
- Mawukura (Mulgra) Jimmy Nerrimah
- Megan Cope
- Mervyn Bishop
- Michael Nelson Tjakamarra
- Michael Riley
- Mick Namarari Tjapaltjarri
- Minnie Pwerle
- Mithinarri Gurruwiwi
- Molly Jugadai Napaltjarri
- Mona Rockman Napaljarri
- Naata Nungurrayi
- Naomi Hobson
- Narputta Nangala
- Ngoia Pollard Napaltjarri
- Nici Cumpston
- Nonggirrnga Marawili
- Nora Andy Napaltjarri
- Norah Nelson Napaljarri
- Nyakul Dawson
- Nyapanyapa Yunupingu
- Nyuju Stumpy Brown
- Nyurpaya Kaika Burton
- Olga Miller
- Paddy Bedford
- Paddy Compass Namadbara
- Paddy Japaljarri Stewart
- Paji Honeychild Yankarr
- Pantjiti Mary McLean
- Pansy Napangardi
- Parara Napaltjarri
- Patrick Tjungurrayi
- Peggy Napangardi Jones
- Peggy Rockman Napaljarri
- Phyllis Thomas
- Queenie McKenzie
- r e a
- Regina Pilawuk Wilson
- Rerrkirrwanga Mununggurr
- Revel Cooper
- Richard Bell
- Ronnie Tjampitjinpa
- Rosella Namok
- Rover Thomas
- Sally Morgan
- Sally M. Nangala Mulda
- Sheila Brown Napaljarri
- Shirley Macnamara
- Shirley Purdie
- Shorty Lungkata Tjungurayyi
- Sid Domic
- Susie Bootja Bootja Napaltjarri
- Takariya Napaltjarri
- Therese Ryder
- Timmy Payungka Tjapangati
- Tjunkiya Napaltjarri
- Tjyllyungoo (Lance Chadd)
- Tom Djäwa (also known as Djäwa Daygurrgurr)
- Tommy Watson
- Tony Albert
- Topsy Gibson Napaljarri
- Tracey Moffatt
- Tuppy Ngintja Goodwin
- Valerie Lynch Napaltjarri
- Vernon Ah Kee
- Vincent Namatjira
- Wandjuk Marika
- Wenten Rubuntja
- Wintjiya Napaltjarri
- William Barak
- Yaritji Young
- Yilpi Adamson

== See also ==
- List of Indigenous Australian art movements and cooperatives
- List of Indigenous Australian musicians
- List of Indigenous Australian writers
- Indigenous Australian art
