= Mona Rockman Napaljarri =

Australian artist

- Born: c. 1924; Tanami Downs, Northern Territory
- Style: Painting, pottery
- Relatives: Peggy Rockman Napaljarri; Biddy Rockman Napaljarri

Mona Rockman Napaljarri (born c. 1924) is a Warlpiri-speaking Indigenous artist from Australia's Western Desert region. Her paintings and pottery are held in the collection of the National Gallery of Victoria.

== Life ==
Mona Rockman was born around 1924 at Mongrel Downs, now Tanami Downs pastoral station, in the Northern Territory, about 700 kilometres north-west of Alice Springs.

Napaljarri (in Warlpiri) or Napaltjarri (in Western Desert dialects) is a skin name, one of sixteen used to denote the subsections or subgroups in the kinship system of central Australian Indigenous people. These names define kinship relationships that influence preferred marriage partners and may be associated with particular totems. Although they may be used as terms of address, they are not surnames in the sense used by Europeans. Thus 'Mona Rockman' is the element of the artist's name that is specifically hers.

Mona was one of six children of Milkila Jungarayi. Her siblings include artists Biddy Rockman Napaljarri and Peggy Rockman Napaljarri. Mona Rockman is one of the traditional owners recognised in the Tanami Downs land claim, under the Aboriginal Land Rights Act 1976.

== Art ==
=== Background ===
Contemporary Indigenous art of the western desert began when Indigenous men at Papunya began painting in 1971, assisted by teacher Geoffrey Bardon. Their work, which used acrylic paints to create designs representing body painting and ground sculptures, rapidly spread across Indigenous communities of central Australia, particularly following the commencement of a government-sanctioned art program in central Australia in 1983. By the 1980s and 1990s, such work was being exhibited internationally. The first artists, including all of the founders of the Papunya Tula artists' company, had been men, and there was resistance amongst the Pintupi men of central Australia to women painting. However, there was also a desire amongst many of the women to participate, and in the 1990s large numbers of them began to create paintings. In the western desert communities such as Kintore, Yuendumu, Balgo, and on the outstations, people were beginning to create art works expressly for exhibition and sale.

=== Career ===
Mona Rockman was probably one of a number of artists who first learned painting through a course run in 1986 at Lajamanu by an adult education officer, John Quinn, associated with the local Technical and Further Education unit. The course, initially attended only by men, eventually enrolled over a hundred community members. Others who began their careers through that course include Louisa Napaljarri, as well as Mona's sister Peggy Rockman.

Western Desert artists such as Mona will frequently paint particular 'dreamings', or stories, for which they have personal responsibility or rights. Mona's dreamings are Ngatijiiri (budgerigar) and Warna (snake). In addition to painting, Mona has also worked in pottery, with her work in both media being exhibited by the National Gallery of Victoria.
