= BQW =

BQW or bqw may refer to:

- BQW, the IATA code for Balgo Hill Airport, Western Australia
- bqw, the ISO 639-3 code for Buru–Angwe language, Nigeria
