= Napangardi =

Napangardi is a skin name used to denote the subsections or subgroups in the kinship system of central Australian Indigenous people. Notable people with the skin name include:

- Dorothy Napangardi (early 1950s-2013), Australian artist
- Judy Watson Napangardi (c.1925–2016), Australian artist
- Lily Kelly Napangardi (born c.1948), Australian artist
- Pansy Napangardi (born 1948), Australian artist
