= Alice Springs Public Library =

Library in Northern Territory, Australia

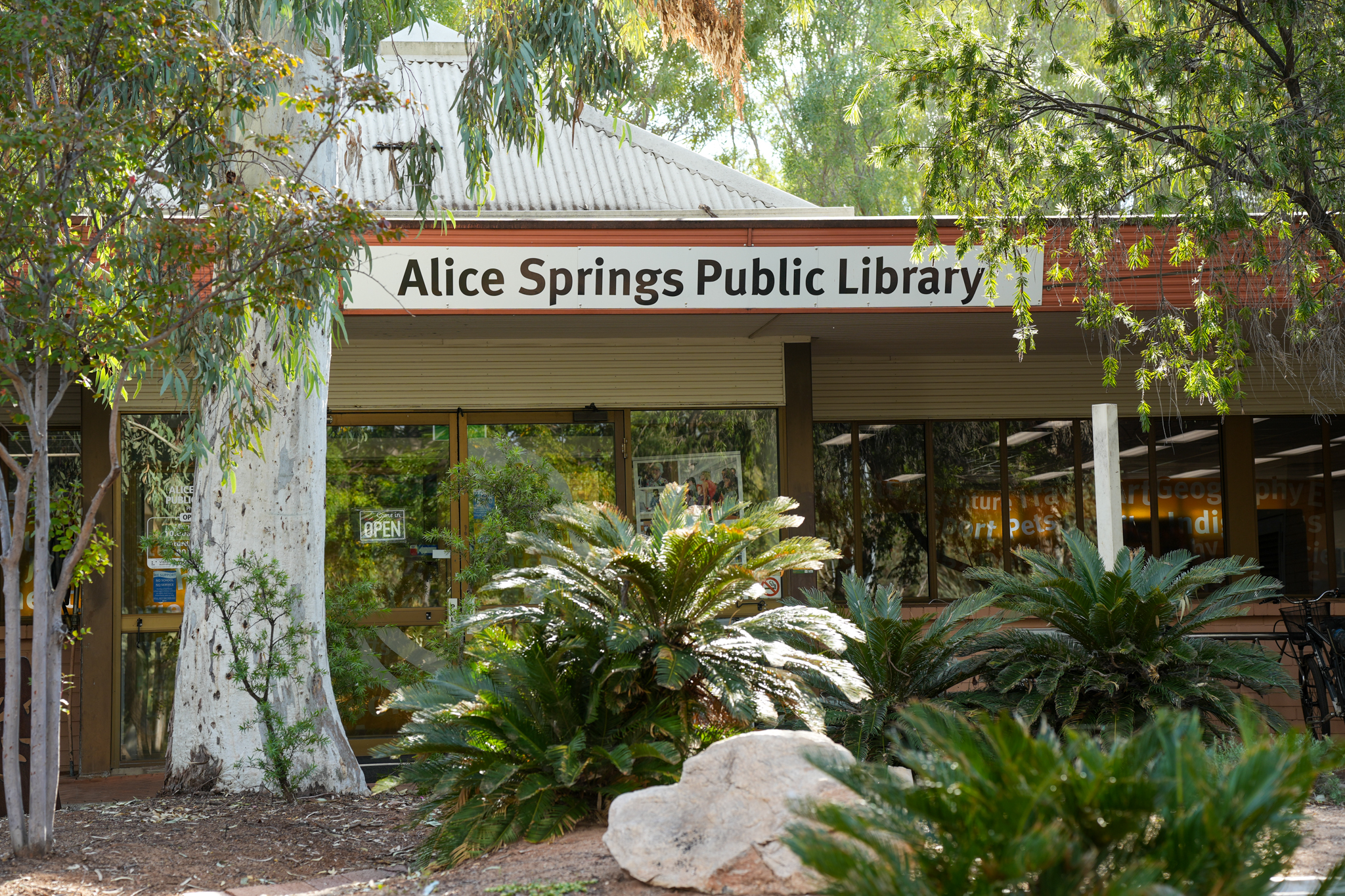
- The entrance to Alice Springs Public Library featuring the Nevil Shute Memorial Garden there, 2024
- 23°42′6″S 133°52′59″E
- Location: Alice Springs, Australia
- Type: public library

Other information
- Website: https://alicesprings.nt.gov.au/recreation/library

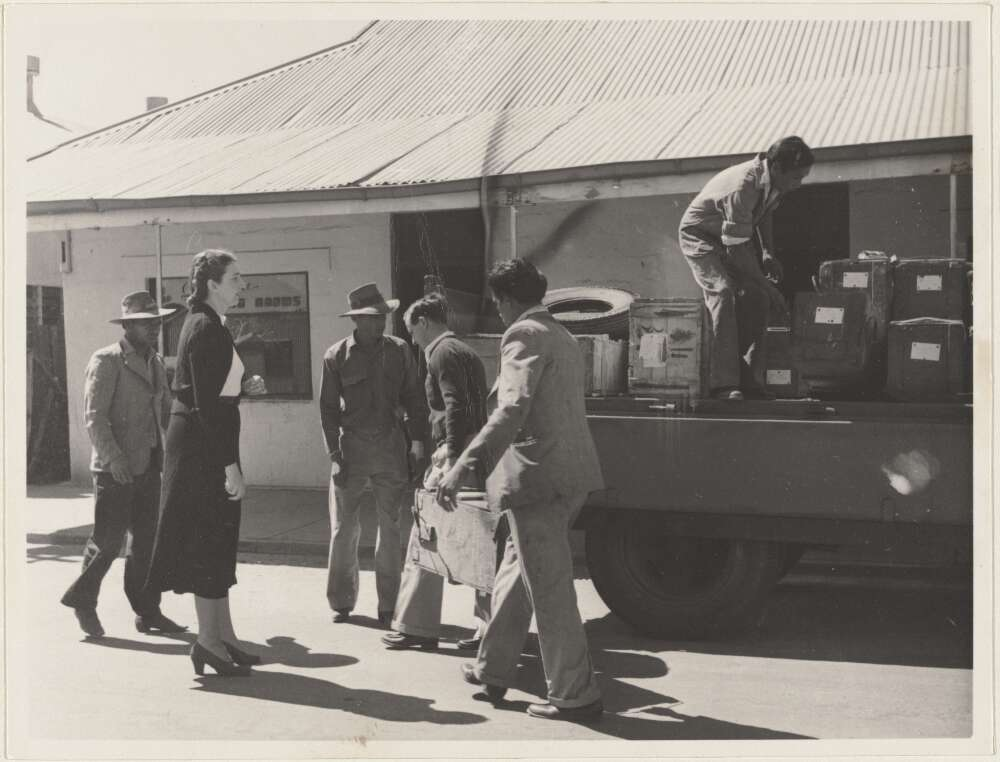
Joy Cuskey, librarian, unpacking books for the first library, taking over the old Gum Tree Cafe in Todd Street, Alice Springs, Northern Territory, 1953 / Australian Information Service

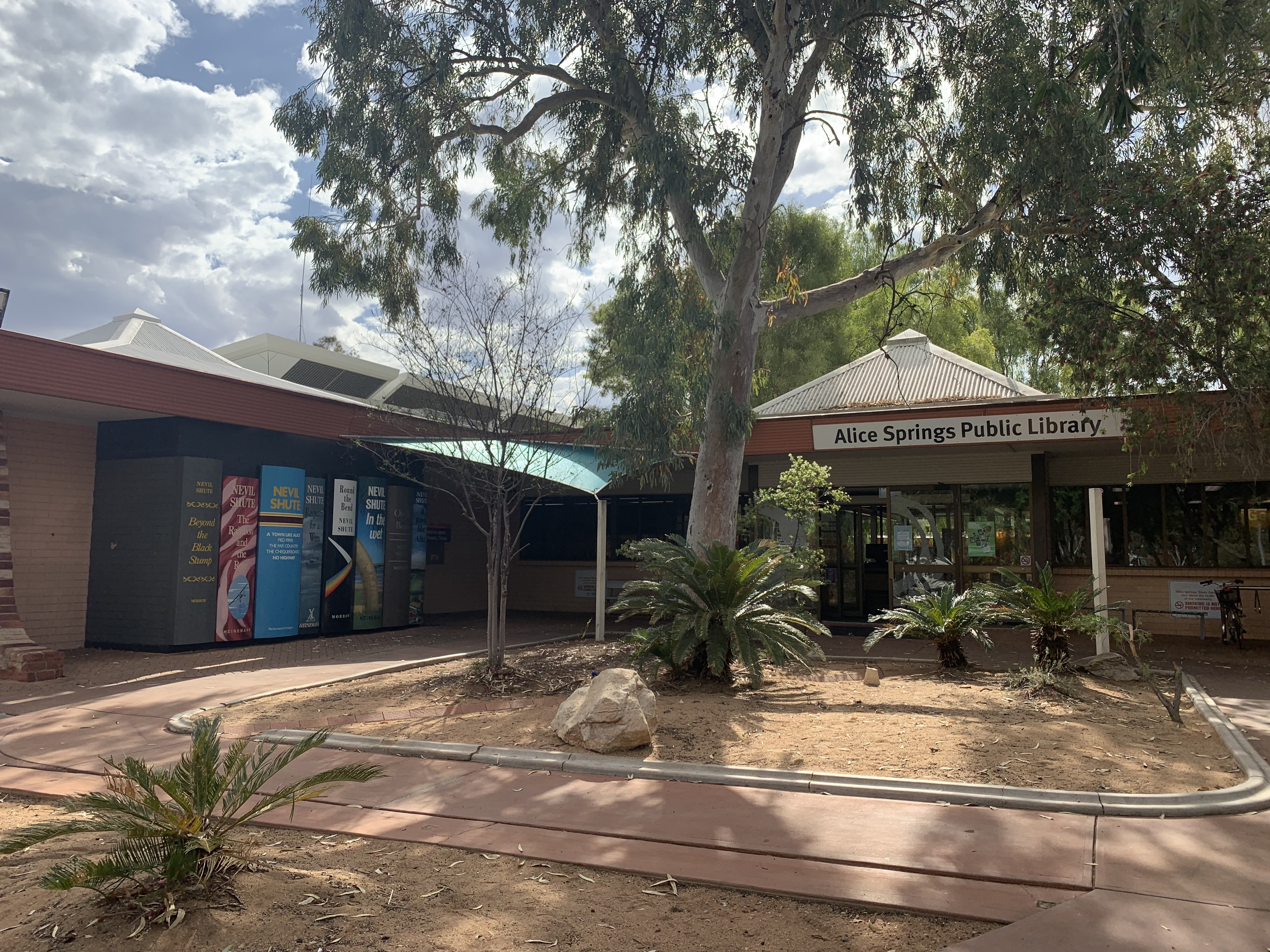
Alice Springs Public Library, 2019

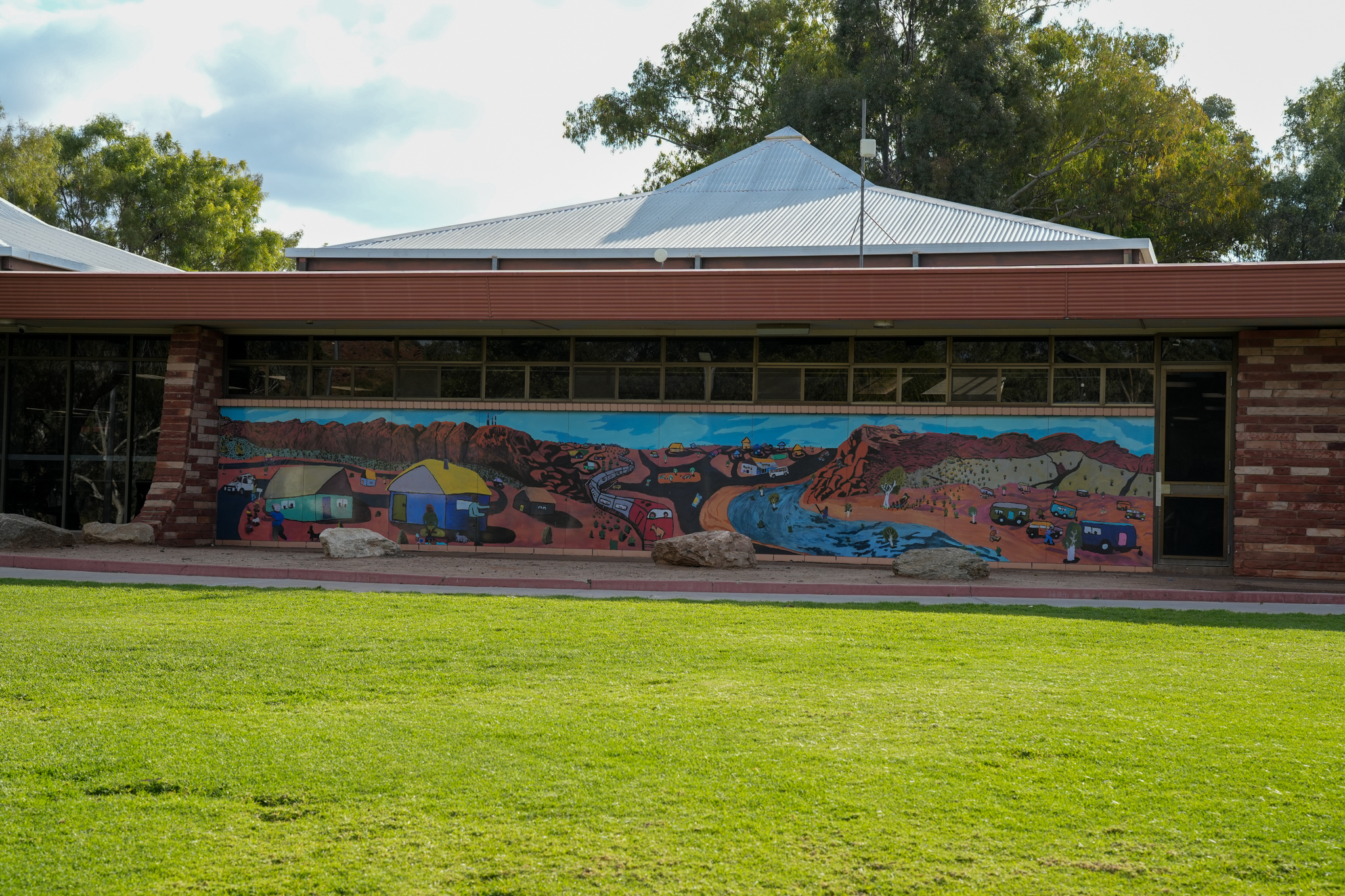
External view of the library showing mural painted/designed by Billy Tjampijinpa Kenda with Bindi Mwerre Anthurre Artists, Mural completed in 2020, photo taken 2024

The Alice Springs Public Library is a public library service in the Northern Territory. The library provides traditional library services to the community of Alice Springs (Mparntwe) and is an essential part of the Central Australian community and receives more than 120,000 visitors every year.

While officially named the 'Nevil Shute Memorial Library', the name is little used.

== History ==
A number of small libraries existed in Alice Springs from its earliest days and, during the 1930s, the Country Women's Association ran a small library for the community. In 1938 this was taken over by the Northern Territory Government and, by 1940, they boasted 760 books. During World War II the library fell in to disuse and, after the war, the National Library of Australia provided funds for a new library in the town. This would be the first public library and it was first located at the old 'Gum Tree Cafe' (formerly Charlie Meyers saddlery: see Annie Meyers).

The first librarian appointed was Joy Cuskey (later Brucek) who arrived on 28 August 1953 with 3,000 books which she travelled from Darwin to Alice Springs with on a fire truck. The library opened on 13 October 1953 and, within two hours of opening, had 50 members and 240 within the following week. When interviewed in 1954, six months after opening, Cuskey described the community of Alice Springs as "book hungry" and said that "people would read almost anything they can get, but travel books and mystery stories are the biggest demand". From 1954 the library offered a 'Library of the Air' which sent out library catalogues and membership cards to outlying cattle stations with Connellan Airways freighting books at a small flat rate.

Soon the library outgrew its site and, in 1958, it moved to a refurbished cottage on Hartley Street - a low-slung, white fibro bungalow with a sloping roof next to the Old Courthouse. It was here that Sylvia Perrurle Neale, who later became the libraries first Indigenous Services Officer, first experienced the library and she remembers sitting outside the library and yearning to go in and said of it:

There I was a skinny 9-year-old Aboriginal kid so shy I would become frozen in terror in any new situation, sitting outside that little white man's building waiting and watching the white people coming and going carrying books. Three of four times a week I would sit there trying to get a peek inside.

— Sylvia Perrurle Neale, as quoted in 'A library like Alice' (2021)

Cuskey, recognising her interest encouraged her to come inside and Neale said of this:

Through her small window Joy would glance at me every now and then; I would run away but always came back the next day or the day after. Joy made several attempts to get me to go inside; eventually my need to go inside overtook my terror. I crept inside, was given a drink and a biscuit.

— Sylvia Perrurle Neale, as quoted in 'A library like Alice' (2021)

During this period Olive Pink was also a regular visitor and would regularly try to 'pull rank' in appealing to Cuskey that she should have first rights to new books due to her research interests; this led to conflict between the two and Pink began ordering books directly from the National Library. Cuskey retired in the early 1960s.

Having once again outgrown its location the library moved again and, on 19 October 1980, the library on its current location was opened and it was at this point that the library was officially called the 'Nevil Shute Memorial Library' in honour of the attention Nevil Shute's book A Town Like Alice, and the subsequent film, had drawn to the town. At the time of opening this was already a controversial choice but has never passed into common use.

== Special collections ==
The library is home to two not-for-loan special collections; these are:

=== Alice Springs Collection ===
The Alice Springs Collection is a collection of materials which relate to the historical, scientific and cultural heritage of Central Australia. This is a reference collection and items are not available for loan. They can be viewed in the Library during regular opening hours. All items in the collection are not for loan.

This collection was developed in response to the identified need for a reference collection dedicated to the Central Australian region for use by local and interstate visitors in the mid-1970s. It was originally stored in a small locked room and visitors had to request access, however, in recognition of its importance, an extension was made to the library in 1995 was made to house it with the addition of a spacious reading room.

The Alice Springs Collection also has a significant digital collection and holds editions of the Centralian Advocate, from 1947 to 2015, in PDF format; access to issues published between 2015 and the Advocates closure in 2020 are available through Territory Stories which is operated by Library & Archives NT.

Additionally over 6000 images, most of which are from the Central Australian Historical Images Collection, which is made up from 29 smaller collections, these are available on an intranet system available on computers inside the collection room. These images feature images from around the region and they were collected by local historian Geoff Purdie and Barry Allwright in partnership with the library. In 2019 the library received a grant to complete a cultural sensitivity assessment of the collection and this was carried out by Braydon Kanjira, a traditional owner from Ntaria (Hermannsburg) who has extensive experience in the repatriation of Arrernte knowledge and objects. He worked alongside library staff, including the Indigenous Services Officer, and a 'traffic-lighting' system was used to classify the image's in terms of access. These were:

- Green - for open access
- Orange - for medium access - a specific warning will need to be accepted/acknowledged before viewing the image
- Red - for very limited access - the image will not appear in search and/or will be significantly blurred; access has to be requested from the library.

=== Akaltye Antheme ===
The Akaltye-Antheme (pronounced 'aculcha andum') collection, a collection of materials produced for and by the Aboriginal people of Central Australia, is alongside the Alice Springs Collection, one of the major special collections at the library. It was established in 2002 in partnership with a group of traditional owners from the region.

Meaning 'giving knowledge' in Arrernte, Akaltye-Antheme offers visitors to the library an insight into contemporary Indigenous issues and culture and is designed for browsing. All items in the collection are not for loan.

A sub-set of the collection is the Local Languages Collection which consists of early reader texts and books for adults in more than 8 different Central Australian languages including Arrernte, Warlpiri, Luritja, Anmatyerr, Pitjantjatjara and Alyawarre.

This collection was recently awarded first prize in the Australian Library and Information Association (ALIA) Library Stars competition. This acknowledged the unique nature of this collection, which contains material not held by any other library or archive service.

Whereas other Australian library services are attempting to provide library services to the Indigenous people of Australia, this collection is part of an effort by past librarians which has been so successful that up to 80% of those using the library at any given moment may be Aboriginal.

Of the Akaltye Antheme Collection Sylvia Perrurle Neale, the former Indigenous Services Officer at the library, said:

Akaltye Antheme and the reasoning behind its development is a great beginning in achieving the Alice Springs Public Library's goal for its commitments to its Indigenous patrons. I have witnessed this growth and development of the Collection, the new initiatives, the growth in the numbers of Indigenous people joining the Library, people using the internet and using the Library as a meeting place, a meeting place where they are welcomed and can access materials they can relate to.

— Sylvia Perrurle Neale, Akaltye Antheme, a continuing partnership (2008)

In the early 2000s an area known as the 'Tjiplis' Cinema' was established in the main library space, next to the Akaltye Antheme Collection, where visitors to the library can watch movies (VHS and now DVDs) in the comfort of the library space using headphones. This proved to be very popular with those unable to watch movies at home, including town campers and is a way of ensuring the library is a place for everybody in the region. Tjilpi is a Pitjantjatjara word meaning "old man".

== Public art ==
There are numerous pieces of public art around the Alice Springs Public Library; these include:

- The "Nevil Shute Giant Books" which form part of the Nevil Shute Memorial Garden by the entrance to the library; these were installed in 2007 and are featured on the Australia's big things list. These did draw criticism from some in the local community who believed that, in again honouring Shute, the library was not reflecting the diversity of the town.
- The murals "All Them Tourists Goin’ to Look at Countryside" and "Lookin’ Through Gap at Alice Springs Town" by Billy Tjampitjinpa Kenda in partnership with Bindi Mwerre Anthurre Artists which were installed in 2020 with funds made available from Arts NT. In total the murals are 22 metres long and show the artists playful use of narrative and his observations of life in and around Mparntwe (Alice Springs).
- The "Library Art Path", concrete inlays, outside the library was installed by artist Elliat Rich in 2012.
