= Valerie Lynch Napaltjarri =

Australian artist (born 1970)

- Born: 13 September 1970 (age 55); Papunya
- Occupations: Painter, printmaker

Valerie Lynch Napaltjarri (born 13 September 1970) is an Indigenous Australian artist from Papunya in Australia's Northern Territory. She is a painter and printmaker whose work has been collected by the National Gallery of Australia.

== Life ==
Valerie Lynch was born 13 September 1970 at Papunya, Northern Territory. As of 2008, she lived at Papunya, and is a director of the Papunya Tjupi Art Centre Aboriginal Corporation.

Napaljarri (in Warlpiri) or Napaltjarri (in Western Desert dialects) is a skin name, one of sixteen used to denote the subsections or subgroups in the kinship system of central Australian Indigenous people. These names define kinship relationships that influence preferred marriage partners and may be associated with particular totems. Although they may be used as terms of address, they are not surnames in the sense used by Europeans. Thus "Valerie Lynch" is the element of the artist's name that is specifically hers.

== Art ==
=== Background ===
Contemporary Indigenous art of the western desert began when Indigenous men at Papunya began painting in 1971, assisted by teacher Geoffrey Bardon. Their work, which used acrylic paints to create designs representing body painting and ground sculptures, rapidly spread across Indigenous communities of central Australia, particularly following the commencement of a government-sanctioned art program in central Australia in 1983. By the 1980s and 1990s, such work was being exhibited internationally. The first artists, including all of the founders of the Papunya Tula artists' company, had been men, and there was resistance amongst the Pintupi men of central Australia to women painting. However, there was also a desire amongst many of the women to participate, and in the 1990s large numbers of them began to create paintings. In the western desert communities such as Kintore, Yuendumu, Balgo, and on the outstations, people were beginning to create art works expressly for exhibition and sale.

=== Career ===
Valerie Lynch is a member of Papunya Tjupi, a group of descendants of the Papunya Tula painters of the 1970s. Her work Women Digging for Honey Ants at Karrinyarra was included in a group exhibition, organised by prominent curator and author Vivien Johnson, at the Ivan Dougherty Gallery in 2007. The exhibition marked the opening of the first art centre in three decades at the Papunya community. As well as painting, Valerie Lynch has undertaken printmaking. Two of her prints, made using open-bite etching and aquatint, are in the collection of the National Gallery of Australia. These were made in 2007, published by Cicada Press, and purchased by the gallery in that same year. Also in 2007, Valerie Lynch participated in a group exhibition, organised through the University of New South Wales College of Fine Arts, and held at Orange, New South Wales Regional Gallery. Her work was exhibited alongside that of other prominent Australian artists including Adam Cullen, John Coburn, Cherry Hood and Michael Nelson Jagamarra.

== Collections ==
- National Gallery of Australia
