= Goodenia faucium =

Mount Liebig goodenia

Scientific classification
- Kingdom: Plantae
- Clade: Tracheophytes
- Clade: Angiosperms
- Clade: Eudicots
- Clade: Asterids
- Order: Asterales
- Family: Goodeniaceae
- Genus: Goodenia
- Species: G. faucium

Binomial name
- Goodenia faucium Carolin

Species of plant

Goodenia faucium, commonly known as the Mount Liebig goodenia, is a species of flowering plant in the family Goodeniaceae and is endemic to the Northern Territory. It is a shrubby perennial with narrow elliptic to egg-shaped, toothed leaves and racemes of yellow flowers.

== Description ==
Goodenia faucium is a shrubby, clump-forming plant that typically grows to a height of 30–40 cm (12–16 in) with sticky, often varnished stems and leaves. The leaves are narrow elliptic to egg-shaped with the narrower end towards the base, 15–35 mm (0.59–1.38 in) long and 6–10 mm (0.24–0.39 in) wide, with toothed edges. The flowers are arranged in racemes up to 200 mm (7.9 in) long with leaf-like bracts long at the base, each flower on a pedicel 8–15 mm (0.31–0.59 in) long. The sepals are narrow elliptic to lance-shaped, about 4 mm (0.16 in) long, the corolla yellow, 14–15 mm (0.55–0.59 in) long. The lower lobes of the corolla are about 4 mm (0.16 in) long with wings about 2 mm (0.079 in) wide. Flowering has been observed in July and the fruit is a more or less spherical capsule about 4.5 mm (0.18 in) in diameter.

== Taxonomy and naming ==
Goodenia faucium was first formally described in 1980 by Roger Charles Carolin in the journal Telopea from material collected by George Chippendale in a gorge near Mount Liebig in 1957. The specific epithet (faucium) refers to the narrow valleys near Mount Liebig where this species appears to be confined.

== Distribution and habitat ==
This goodenia grows in the MacDonnell Ranges where it usually grows in cracks in cliff faces.

== Conservation status ==
Goodenia faucium is classified as "near threatened" under the Northern Territory Government Territory Parks and Wildlife Conservation Act 1976.
