= Jean Baptiste Apuatimi =

Australian artist (1940–2013)

Jean Baptiste Apuatimi (1940–2013) was a significant Tiwi Island artist whose work is held at most major and several minor Australian galleries and the British Museum. Her works were first exhibited in 1991 in group shows. From 1997 until her death, Apuatimi worked full-time with the Tiwi Design Aboriginal Cooperative (now Tiwi Designs).

== Early life ==
Jean Baptiste was born in 1940 at Pirlangimpi (Garden Point) on Yermalner (Melville Island) in the East Timor Sea. Her father's name for her was Pulukatu. As a child she moved with her family to Bathurst Island. She was educated as a "dormitory girl" at the Catholic Bathurst Island Mission. Her parents selected Declan Apuatimi, ten years her senior, as her husband and she was married to him at age 14 years.

== Career ==
Baptiste credited her artist husband, renowned carver Declan Apuatimi, as inspiring and teaching her how to create artwork. Following Apuatimi's first solo show in 1987, Tiwi Islands artists gained national and international recognition. The creation of a market for their work strengthened the traditional aesthetic of Tiwi artworks, and Baptiste became a leading exponent of this style. Baptiste took up painting after her husband's 1985 death and participated with other Tiwi Island women artists Kitty Kantilla and Freda Warlapinni in the 1989 creation of the Jilamara Arts Centre at Milikapiti on Melville Island, which further strengthened the artistic community and reputation of the region.

Baptiste's paintings were included in the Jilamara Arts Centre's first group exhibit, Ngingingawula Jilamara Kapi Purunguparri (Our Designs on Bark), which took place just three years after the Centre began. The exhibition was at the National Gallery of Victoria (NGV), which then acquired the entire show for its collection. In 2007, Baptiste was one of five major senior Indigenous artists whose work was a focus of the National Gallery of Australia's inaugural National Indigenous Art Triennial. That exhibit, titled Culture Warriors, travelled to Washington, DC in 2009. Baptiste attended the opening, where Joyce N. Bogosian captured a striking photograph of her in front of one of her artworks, Yirrakamini (2007). Her solo exhibition at the Rebecca Hossack Gallery in London in July 2009 was titled Tapalinga

The exhibition for the Darwin Festival in 2012 featured works by Baptiste and Maria Josette Orsto. Titled Maternal Lines the exhibition commenced on 11 August 2012 at the Northern Editions Gallery, Charles Darwin University Campus.

Her works featured prominently in the 2020–21 National Gallery of Victoria's TIWI exhibition. They included Purrukuparli and Wai-ai and Purrukuparli ngirramini (earth pigments on canvas) paintings of the story of Purrukuparli about how death first came to the Tiwi and the origins of the first pukumani (mourning) ceremony. Other paintings are on bark Jilamara, Pamijini, Pamijini alikwampini amintiya tutini and more (earth pigments on stringybark) which are abstractions of jilmara (body painting), tutini (poles) and pamijini (arm bands).

Her work, Jikapayinga, was shown in Part Two of the exhibition, "Know my name: Australian women artists 1900 to now" at the National Gallery of Australia.

== Artistic style ==
Baptiste is renowned for bringing to the world the Tiwi Island style of jilamara—or what she called "body painting style". In particular, she adopted the long geometric designs that were painted on a widow's body before she is ceremonially washed. She began her art career as a sculptor, carving in wood then moved to painting on canvas and bark.

== Holdings in Australian public collections ==
- Eighteen works by Jean Baptiste Apuatimi held at National Gallery of Australia.
- Twenty works by Jean Baptiste Apuatimi held at the National Gallery of Victoria (NGV).
- Jilamara (2012) by Jean Baptiste Apuatimi at Art Gallery of NSW.
- Jean Baptiste Apuatimi works at Charles Darwin University Art Collection and Art Gallery.
- Parlini Jilmara Tunga and Tunga (basket) at the British Museum.
- Pwanga at Art Gallery of New South Wales.
