= Nora Andy Napaltjarri =

Australian artist

- Born: c.1957 Haasts Bluff, Northern Territory, Australia
- Known for: Painting

Nora Andy Napaltjarri (born c. 1957) is a Warlpiri- and Luritja-speaking Indigenous artist from Australia's Western Desert region. Like her mother Entalura Nangala, Nora has painted for Indigenous artists' cooperative Papunya Tula. Her work has been exhibited at the Gauguin Museum in Tahiti, and is held by Artbank.

== Life ==
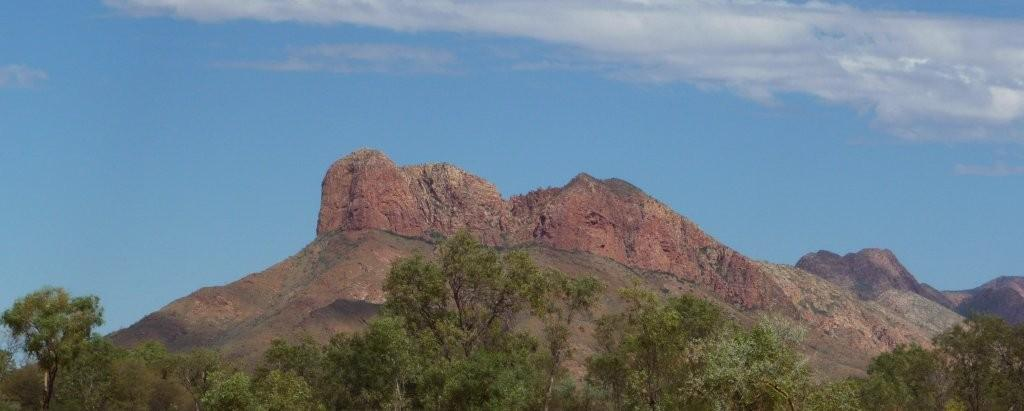
Haasts Bluff, where Nora Andy was born.

Nora Andy was born circa 1957: Karrinyarra Artists' biography gives a date of 1956, while Birnberg and Kreczmanski's 2004 biographical dictionary gives circa 1957. She was born at Haasts Bluff, Northern Territory, west of Alice Springs. The ambiguity around the year of birth is in part because Indigenous Australians operate using a different conception of time, often estimating dates through comparisons with the occurrence of other events.

'Napaljarri' (in Warlpiri) or 'Napaltjarri' (in Western Desert dialects) is a skin name, one of sixteen used to denote the subsections or subgroups in the kinship system of central Australian Indigenous people. These names define kinship relationships that influence preferred marriage partners and may be associated with particular totems. Although they may be used as terms of address, they are not surnames in the sense used by Europeans. Thus 'Nora Andy' is the element of the artist's name that is specifically hers.

Nora Andy's mother is artist Entalura Nangala who, along with Nora's sisters Ada Andy Napaltjarri, Emily Andy Napaltjarri and Charlene Andy Napaltjarri, painted for major Indigenous art company Papunya Tula. While she has lived in Mount Allen and Mount Liebig (both near Haasts Bluff), in 1994 Nora Andy was living in either Alice Springs or Papunya (both locations are cited in the one source).

== Art ==
=== Background ===
Contemporary Indigenous art of the western desert began when Indigenous men at Papunya began painting in 1971, assisted by teacher Geoffrey Bardon. Their work, which used acrylic paints to create designs representing body painting and ground sculptures, rapidly spread across Indigenous communities of central Australia, particularly following the commencement of a government-sanctioned art program in central Australia in 1983. By the 1980s and 1990s, such work was being exhibited internationally. The first artists, including all of the founders of the Papunya Tula artists' company, had been men, and there was resistance amongst the Pintupi men of central Australia to women painting. However, there was also a desire amongst many of the women to participate, and in the 1990s large numbers of them began to create paintings. In the western desert communities such as Kintore, Yuendumu, Balgo and on the outstations, people were beginning to create art works expressly for exhibition and sale.

=== Career ===
Nora Andy began painting around 1987 in Alice Springs. Western Desert artists such as Nora will frequently paint particular 'dreamings', or stories, for which they have personal responsibility or rights, with bush onion dreaming being a theme in her work. The story is associated with her father's country around Haasts Bluff.

Nora Andy's work is held by Artbank. It was included in an exhibition at the Gauguin Museum in Tahiti in 1988.

== Collections ==
- Artbank
