= Ngoia Pollard Napaltjarri =

Australian artist (born c. 1948)

- Born: c.1948 Haasts Bluff, Northern Territory, Australia
- Died: 17 November 2022 (aged 73–74)
- Known for: Painting
- Notable work: Swamps west of Nyirripi
- Awards: painting prize, 2006 National Aboriginal & Torres Strait Islander Art Award

Ngoia Pollard Napaltjarri (born c. 1948; died 17 November 2022, also known as Ngnoia) was a Walpiri-speaking Indigenous artist from Australia's Western Desert region. Ngoia Pollard married Jack Tjampitjinpa, who became an artist working with the Papunya Tula company, and they had five children.

Having commenced painting in 1997, Ngoia Pollard won a major regional art prize in 2004. She went on to win the painting prize in the 2006 National Aboriginal & Torres Strait Islander Art Awards. Her works are held in major private and public collections, including the National Gallery of Australia.

== Life ==
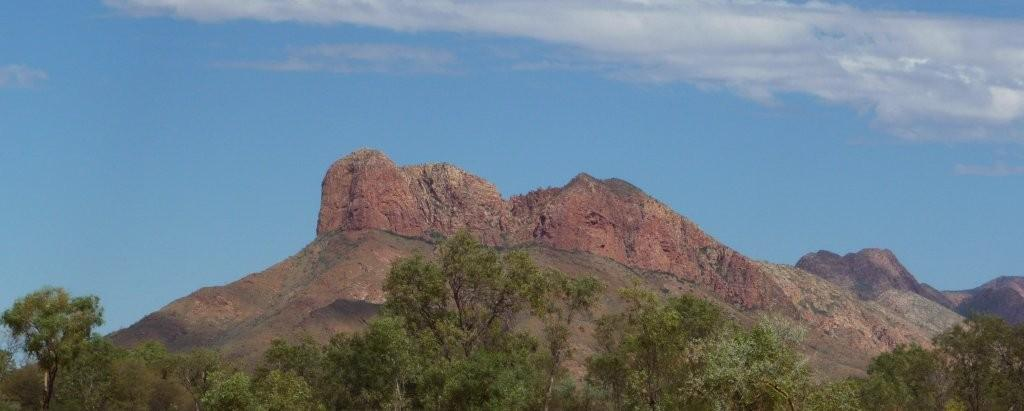
Haasts Bluff, where Ngoia Pollard was born

Daughter of Angoona Nangala and Jim Tjungurrayi, Ngoia Pollard was born circa 1948 in Haasts Bluff, Northern Territory, west of Alice Springs. The ambiguity around the year of birth is in part because Indigenous Australians operate using a different conception of time, often estimating dates through comparisons with the occurrence of other events.

'Napaljarri' (in Warlpiri) or 'Napaltjarri' (in Western Desert dialects) is a skin name, one of sixteen used to denote the subsections or subgroups in the kinship system of central Australian Indigenous people. These names define kinship relationships that influence preferred marriage partners and may be associated with particular totems. Although they may be used as terms of address, they are not surnames in the sense used by Europeans. Thus 'Ngoia Pollard' is the element of the artist's name that is specifically hers.

Ngoia Pollard attended school at Papunya, and worked at the mission kitchen there. She married Jack Tjampitjinpa and they moved to Kintore, and then on to Mount Liebig (now Amundurrngu Outstation) which at that time was unoccupied, about fifty kilometres west of Haasts Bluff. It was one of many outstations established by people from Papunya in the 1970s. Ngoia Pollard and Jack had five children. Jack died in 1988; in 2008 Ngoia was still living at Mount Liebig. She died in 2022.

== Art ==
=== Background ===
Contemporary Indigenous art of the western desert began when Indigenous men at Papunya began painting in 1971, assisted by teacher Geoffrey Bardon. Their work, which used acrylic paints to create designs representing body painting and ground sculptures, rapidly spread across Indigenous communities of central Australia, particularly following the commencement of a government-sanctioned art program in central Australia in 1983. By the 1980s and 1990s, such work was being exhibited internationally. The first artists, including all of the founders of the Papunya Tula artists' company, had been men, and there was resistance amongst the Pintupi men of central Australia to women painting.

However, there was a desire among many women to participate, and in the 1990s large numbers of them began to create paintings. In the western desert communities such as Kintore, Yuendumu, Balgo, and on the outstations, people were beginning to create art works expressly for exhibition and sale.

=== Career ===
Ngoia Pollard began her contemporary artistic career by assisting her husband, who painted with Papunya Tula artists for several years prior to his death. In 1997, Ngoia Pollard began painting independently, and in 2004 won the first prize in a central Australian painting competition supported by the region's major newspaper, the Centralian Advocate. In 2006, Ngoia Pollard won the painting prize in the National Aboriginal & Torres Strait Islander Art Awards, with her work Swamps west of Nyirripi. Another of her works painted in the same year, and carrying the same title, was acquired by the Art Gallery of South Australia. 2006 was also marked by an artist's residency in Copenhagen, shared with fellow Indigenous artist Lilly Kelly Napangardi, whom she had known since they attended school together in the 1960s.

Collections holding her works include the National Gallery of Australia. She has had solo exhibitions with private galleries in Sydney and Perth.

Western Desert artists such as Ngoia Pollard frequently paint particular 'dreamings', or stories, for which they have personal responsibility or rights. Many of Ngoia's works relate to the region of Yamunturrngu, or Mount Liebig, in the country to the west of Haasts Bluff; this is her father's country:

...infused with the spiritual power of the narrative of the watersnake. This snake lives in the swamps and lakes near Nyrippi (Talarada), unoccupied 'dangerous territory' north west of Mt. Liebig. The transcendental calm of her paintings, with their drifts of monochrome clouds of dots, belie the danger of the land and its creatures that they depict.

Her works are often characterised by the use of oval shapes representing swamps and lakes. Her palette is usually black and white, though red may be used to highlight oval forms. The dotted forms represent the ground cracking as water dries up. Other themes in her work include the sand hills of the desert country.

== Collections ==
- National Gallery of Australia
- Corrigan Collection
