= Mount Liebig, Northern Territory =

Mount Liebig Watiyawanu
- Suburb
- Coordinates: 23°16′5″S 131°16′41″E
- Country: Australia
- State: Northern Territory
- LGA: MacDonnell Region
- Location: 325 km (202 mi) W of Alice Springs

Government
  - Territory electorate: Namatjira
  - Federal division: Lingiari

Area
  - Total: 6.943 km^{2} (2.681 sq mi)

Population
  - Total: 169 (2016 census)
  - Density: 24.34/km^{2} (63.04/sq mi)
- Time zone: UTC+9:30 (ACST)
- Postcode: 0872

Mount Liebig is an Aboriginal community in the Northern Territory of Australia located about 325 kilometres (202 mi) west of Alice Springs.

It is named after the mountain of the same name. As of 2020, it has an area of 6.943 square kilometres (2.681 sq mi).

The 2016 Australian census which was conducted in August 2016 reports that Mount Liebig had 169 people living within its boundaries.

Mount Liebig is located within the federal division of Lingiari, the territory electoral division of Namatjira and the local government area of the MacDonnell Region.
