= Ada Andy Napaltjarri =

Australian Indigenous artist

- Born: c. 1954; Narwietooma Station, near Haasts Bluff, Northern Territory
- Known for: Painting

Ada Andy Napaltjarri (born c. 1954) is a Warlpiri- and Luritja-speaking Indigenous artist from Australia's Western Desert region. Ada was born near Haasts Bluff, Northern Territory, and has lived in several Northern Territory communities. She began painting in the early 1980s at Alice Springs and probably played a role in the development of interest in painting in the communities in which she has lived.

== Life ==
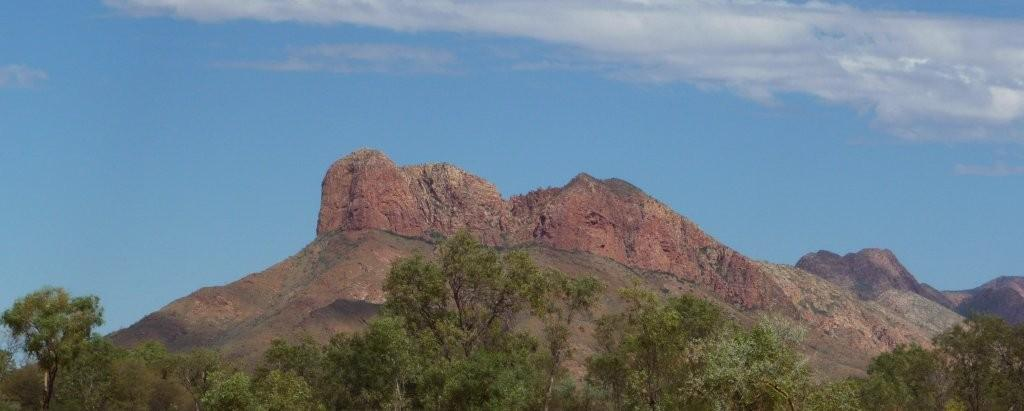
Haasts Bluff, where Ada Andy grew up.

Ada Andy was born in 1954 at Narwietooma Station, near Haasts Bluff, Northern Territory, west of Alice Springs. 'Napaljarri' (in Warlpiri) or 'Napaltjarri' (in Western Desert dialects) is a skin name, one of sixteen used to denote the subsections or subgroups in the kinship system of central Australian Indigenous people. These names define kinship relationships that influence preferred marriage partners and may be associated with particular totems. Although they may be used as terms of address, they are not surnames in the sense used by Europeans. Thus 'Ada Andy' is the element of the artist's name that is specifically hers.

Her mother is artist Entalura Nangala who painted for major Indigenous art company Papunya Tula. And her father is Old Andy (Walpa) Tjungarrayi who is from Karrinyarra Mount wedge station and spoke Warlpiri and Anmeterrye. Her mother Entalura's later traditionally married husband Don Tjungarrayi. Her father however did not marry but did still live with Don and Intalura at Karrinyarra outstation until his death in 2000.

Ada grew up at Haasts Bluff, and then lived at Kintore from around 1955 to around 1964. As of 1981, Ada was married to Alistair Burns, a school teacher from New Zealand, with whom she had lived in several different Northern Territory communities. She has three daughters – Maggie Burns, Laati Burns and Sharon Burns. Ada's sisters Nora Andy Napaltjarri(DEC), Emily Andy Napaltjarri and Sallene Andy Napaltjarri(DEC) are also artists. She Also has three brother Nigel Andy, Evans Andy(DEC) and Randell Andy(DEC).

== Art ==
=== Background ===
Contemporary Indigenous art of the western desert began when Indigenous men at Papunya began painting in 1971, assisted by teacher Geoffrey Bardon. Their work, which used acrylic paints to create designs representing body painting and ground sculptures, rapidly spread across Indigenous communities of central Australia, particularly following the commencement of a government-sanctioned art program in central Australia in 1983. By the 1980s and 1990s, such work was being exhibited internationally. The first artists, including all of the founders of the Papunya Tula artists' company, had been men, and there was resistance amongst the Pintupi men of central Australia to women painting. However, there was also a desire amongst many of the women to participate, and in the 1990s large numbers of them began to create paintings. In the western desert communities such as Kintore, Yuendumu, Balgo, and on the outstations, people were beginning to create art works expressly for exhibition and sale.

=== Career ===
Ada Andy began painting around 1981 or 1982 in Alice Springs. At a time when women first painted with the Papunya Tula company, Ada Andy was one of the first to choose to paint independently, although Birnberg and Kreczmanski record that she did paint for the company. She then lived and painted in communities where her husband was teaching, including Mount Allen, Lajamanu and Willowra, all in the Northern Territory. Vivien Johnson believed Ada may have been partly responsible for the development of interest in painting in those communities.

Western Desert artists such as Ada will frequently paint particular 'dreamings', or stories, for which they have personal responsibility or rights. Ada paints Warumpi Mother and Daughter dreaming, Women Dancing, Yalka (bush onion) dreaming, and stories associated with black plum, wurrampi (honey ant) and Ngapa (water).
