= Margaret Scobie =

Australian artist (born 1948)

- Born: 1948 (age 77–78); Woola Downs, Utopia, Northern Territory, Australia
- Occupation: Painter
- Known for: Painting, contemporary Indigenous Australian art

Margaret Scobie (born 1948 in Woola Downs, Utopia, Northern Territory, Australia) is an Australian Aboriginal artist from the Anmatyerre community, just north of Alice Springs.

Scobie is from one of the most famous Aboriginal artistic families, related to other Aboriginal artists such as Emily Kame Kngwarreye (her aunt), Gloria Petyarre (first cousin), Kathleen Petyarre, Anna Petyarre, and Ada Bird Petyarre.

Margaret Scobie was educated at Ross Park Primary School in Alice Springs. She was introduced to painting at "Awelye" ceremonies and has been a painter for most of her life.

Scobie's painting is to be found in a number of art galleries including the Aboriginal Art Store, the Clare Valley Art Gallery, Didgeridoo Hut & Art Gallery, Doongal Aboriginal Art, Galeria Aniela, and Gallery Gondwana. Most of her artworks depict bush medicine leaves, spinifex grass and Awelye.

Margaret Scobie has three daughters and one son.

== See also ==
- Dreaming (Australian Aboriginal art)
- The Dreaming
- List of Indigenous Australian visual artists
