= Maria Josette Orsto =

Aboriginal artist

- Born: 30 October 1962; Pirlangimpi, NT
- Died: 30 November 2020 (aged 58)
- Known for: Painting

Maria Josette Orsto (30 October 1962 – 30 November 2020) was an aboriginal artist born at Pirlangimpi, on Melville Island (one of the Tiwi Islands in the Northern Territory). Her father, Declan Apuatimi, and her mother, Jean Baptiste Apuatimi, were also noted aboriginal artists from the Tiwi Islands. Orsto was one of the first female members of Tiwi Designs. Prior to her death she worked and lived at Wurrumiyanga (formerly Ngiui) on Bathurst Island.

== Biography ==
Maria Josette Orsto was born at Pirlangimpi, on Melville Island. Her parents, Declan Apuatimi and Jean Baptiste Apuatimi were renowned as painters, sculptors and performance artist. Her father was a ceremony man and artist and her mother was a senior artist. Orsto learned to paint and carve from her father.

== Career ==
Maria Josette Orsto's career began by assisting her father at Tiwi Island Design arts cooperative. Later on in the 90s Orsto began working at the Munupi Arts and Crafts Association during its early days as an arts center. She was the first female artist to work at the art center after it was formed in 1990 by combining Yikiyikini Women's Centre and Pirlangimpi Pottery under the same name. In 1994, Orsto became one of the first female artists to produce a textile for Tiwi Designs, and art center founded by artists Giovanni Tipungwuti and Bede Tungutalum. In 1997, Orsto alongside artist Jock Puautjimi, created a series of seven designs for the first issue of pre-paid envelopes commissioned from Australia Post.

== Tiwi Island Art ==
=== History ===
Tiwi designs used to be painted on people's bodies for ceremonies in order to disguise the identity of the individual so they are hidden from the spirit of the deceased. Nowadays, the Tiwi people wear garments made from fabrics with screen printed designs. The two main ceremonies that play an important role in Tiwi life are the Kurlarma initiation ceremony which celebrates health and regeneration and the Pukumani ceremony which is a ceremony associated with death and mourning.

The Kurlama ceremony is performed annually during the wet season when yams are ripe and a gold ring forms around the moon. The ceremony lasts two to three days and nights and consists of dancing, singing and ritual body painting. The Pukumani ceremony involves the carving and painting of burial poles referred to as tutini, gifts given to the spirit of the dead. The poles are decorated with white, yellow and red ochres creating geometric designs.

Screen printing and fabric were introduced to the islands with the arrival of Father Gsell and the Catholic mission at Nguiu, Bathurst Island in 1911. This greatly impacted the way Tiwi Islanders dress from paperbark aprons to calico skirts and later items of clothing with single motif prints of animals and other subjects. These calico skirts were made using woodblock painting. Screen printing on fabric offered Tiwi people a channel through which to participate in the Western market. The printed fabric was able to be sold locally to tourists as well as to outlets in Darwin.

The Tiwi designs illustrate a link between the Tiwi people and their country. They play a significant role in tying the past and the future as well carrying important cultural knowledge.

=== Maria Josette Orsto and Tiwi Art ===
Maria Josette Orsto's art practice was inspired by the Tiwi Island fabric designs. Orsto worked in a variety of media and techniques including painting, batik-printmaking, and wood sculpture. Her style initially reflected her father's bold painting style and then gradually became more subtle and subdued. She was concerned to have a distinct style that is different from that of her peers. The small dots and lines that she includes in her work aim at giving the impression of a surface of the land or an object, alluding to the surface of the spiritual realm and power it holds. Frequent motifs and themes in her painting include animals, Dreaming, and the Kulama ceremony. Like many Tiwi artists, Orsto's painting involved the used of the pwoja comb, a traditional painting comb that is created by carving ridged lines along the edge of a piece of ironwood cut during the production of a tutini (funeral pole).

== Significant exhibitions ==
- 1996 - Printabout exhibition of sugarlift etching works created by Tiwi artists including Maria Josette Orsto over the course of three years at Northern Editions, a printmaking studio at the University at Charles Darwin University. The exhibition features Orsto's work Kurlama and Jilamara (1994) and Armband and Jilamara (1994).
- 2012 - The second triennial indigenous art exhibition, Undisclosed, at the National Gallery of Australia, included her works, Jikapayinga (Female crocodile) (2007), Pakitiringa (Rain) (2007), and Mayinga (2009).
- 2012 Maternal Lines, Darwin Festival 2012, Jean Baptiste Apuatime and Maria Josette Orsto's 2 and 3 dimensional prints, showing with Bede Turngutalum's Japanese-style wood blocks prints.
- 21 December 2015 to 21 February 2016 - Being Tiwi exhibition at the Museum of Contemporary art in Australia featured prints and paintings by nine Tiwi artists including Maria Josette Orsto's piece Kulama (2010).
- 2020 to 2021 - Jilamara, five of Orsto's batik designs on silk lengths and one batik on cotton were featured in the National Gallery of Victoria's TIWI exhibition. Jilamara means body painting to celebrate kulama (coming of age ceremony). In the same exhibition, Orsto made the bark basket used as part of a ceramic sculpture created by Mark Virgil Puautjimi.

== Collections ==
Her work is held in several public collections including:

- Powerhouse Museum: A work, Jilamara, a screenprint by Osmund Kantiilla based on three paintings by Orsto, is held by the Museum of Applied Arts & Sciences (formerly the Powerhouse Museum), together with a further work, Kurlama.
- National Gallery of Australia: Some 25 works, including Jilmaira (1994), and Mayinga Jilimara (2013).
- QAGOMA: Kulama body painting (2002), purchased 2003, Ngirringani jilamara (2007), purchased 2007, Jilimara (1990), gift of Christopher Chapman.
