= Peggy Rockman Napaljarri =

Australian artist (born 1940)

- Born: c.1940 Tanami Downs, Northern Territory
- Known for: Painting
- Relatives: Mona Rockman Napaljarri; Biddy Rockman Napaljarri
- Awards: Finalist, National Aboriginal & Torres Strait Islander Art Award: 2007

Peggy Rockman Napaljarri (also known as Peggy Yalurrngali Rockman Napaljarri) (born c. 1940) is a Warlpiri-speaking Indigenous artist from Australia's Western Desert region. Born on what is now Tanami Downs pastoral station in the Northern Territory, she learned English when working as a child with a white mining family; Peggy Rockman and her family were subsequently relocated by government authorities to Lajamanu, a new community west of Tennant Creek. Peggy Rockman is one of the traditional owners of Tanami Downs.

Since first learning painting through an adult education course in 1986, Peggy Rockman has painted particular 'dreamings', including Ngatijirri (budgerigar), Warna (snake), Laju and Ngarlu. Her work is in the collection of the National Gallery of Victoria and the Art Gallery of New South Wales. She has co-written Yimikirli: Warlpiri Dreamings and Histories, a collection of texts in the Warlpiri language with English translations.

== Life ==
Peggy Rockman was born around 1940. (Note: The Art Gallery of NSW gives a date of circa 1935 as does Johnson's reference work; Birnberg's dictionary of biographies gives a date of circa 1943.) The ambiguity around the year of birth is in part because Indigenous Australians operate using a different conception of time, often estimating dates through comparisons with the occurrence of other events. Some sources give only "Lima" as a location; a more detailed account suggests she was born at Mungkururrpa, on Tanami Downs (formerly Mongrel Downs), a pastoral station in Australia's Northern Territory.

Her name given at birth was Yalurrngali: Peggy Rockman was a name subsequently given to her by white administrators. 'Napaljarri' (in Warlpiri) or 'Napaltjarri' (in Western Desert dialects) is a skin name, one of sixteen used to denote the subsections or subgroups in the kinship system of central Australian Indigenous people. These names define kinship relationships that influence preferred marriage partners and may be associated with particular totems. Although they may be used as terms of address, they are not surnames in the sense used by Europeans. Thus 'Peggy Rockman' is the element of the artist's name that is specifically hers.

Peggy Rockman had three older sisters, all of whom married Jampu Jakamarra, to whom Peggy herself would also later be married. Her family first settled alongside white Australians – a couple mining gold in the Tanami Desert – when she was aged between six and eight. While still a child herself, she worked caring for the mining family's children, during which time she became a proficient English speaker. After the mine was abandoned, Peggy Rockman's family returned to a nomadic existence in the region, before settling for a time at a pastoral station called Gordon Downs. Around 1952, the family was taken by the government's Native Affairs Branch to a new settlement called Lajamanu, in the central desert west of Tennant Creek, Northern Territory. There, Peggy Rockman was required to work full-time in the settlement's kitchens, being paid with meals, and occasionally also with rations. At the settlement, she had three children with Jampu Jakamarra.

Peggy Rockman was one of six children of Milkila Jungarayi, and her siblings include artists Biddy Rockman Napaljarri and Mona Rockman Napaljarri. Peggy Rockman is one of the traditional owners recognised in the Tanami Downs land claim, under the Aboriginal Land Rights Act 1976. Biographies published in 1994 and 2003 both indicated that she was living in the Lajamanu area, but by 2010 she had settled in Katherine, Northern Territory.

== Art ==
=== Background ===
Contemporary Indigenous art of the western desert began when Indigenous men at Papunya began painting in 1971, assisted by teacher Geoffrey Bardon. Their work, which used acrylic paints to create designs representing body painting and ground sculptures, rapidly spread across Indigenous communities of central Australia, particularly following the commencement of a government-sanctioned art program in central Australia in 1983. By the 1980s and 1990s, such work was being exhibited internationally. The first artists, including all of the founders of the Papunya Tula artists' company, had been men, and there was resistance amongst the Pintupi men of central Australia to women painting. However, there was also a desire amongst many of the women to participate, and in the 1990s large numbers of them began to create paintings. In the western desert communities such as Kintore, Yuendumu, Balgo, and on the outstations, people were beginning to create art works expressly for exhibition and sale.

=== Career ===
Peggy Rockman was one of a number of artists who first learned painting through a course run in 1986 at Lajamanu by an adult education officer, John Quinn, associated with the local Technical and Further Education unit. The course, initially attended only by men, eventually enrolled over a hundred community members. Others who began their painting careers through that course include Mona Rockman Napaljarri and Louisa Napaljarri. Western Desert artists such as Peggy Rockman will frequently paint particular 'dreamings', or stories, for which they have personal responsibility or rights, which in Peggy's case include Ngatijirri (budgerigar), Warna (snake), Laju and Ngarlu.

Peggy Rockman, together with linguist Lee Cataldi, wrote Yimikirli: Warlpiri Dreamings and Histories, a work sponsored by the Australian Institute of Aboriginal and Torres Strait Islander Studies, and published in 1994. It is a 200-page collection of oral texts, collected in Warlpiri and provided with English translations, for which Peggy Rockman was a source as well as editor. A senior dancer amongst her people, Peggy Rockman helped choose the site for, and participated in, a major ceremony for a 1993 Australian Broadcasting Corporation documentary film, Milli Milli. The ceremony, called Wati Kutjarra (Two men) Dreaming, was performed with others including fellow artist Susie Bootja Bootja Napaltjarri.

Peggy Rockman's paintings have been hung in both public and commercial gallery exhibitions, including at the Araluen Centre for Arts and Entertainment and the National Gallery of Victoria's Indigenous art exhibition "Paint Up Big". Commercial galleries showing her work have included William Mora Galleries in Melbourne. A work by Peggy Rockman, Mukaki – bush plum, was included in the 2007 National Aboriginal and Torres Strait Islander Art Award. Her paintings are held by the Art Gallery of New Wales, and the National Gallery of Victoria.

== Collections ==
- Art Gallery of New South Wales
- National Gallery of Victoria
