= Eubena Nampitjin =

Australian painter (1921–2013)

- Born: July 1, 1921
- Died: March 11, 2013 (aged 91)
- Notable work: Kinyu

Eubena Nampitjin (July 1, 1921 – March 11, 2013) was an Australian Aboriginal painter. Born on the Canning Stock Route in remote Western Australia, she was the third of six children, and was taught to be a traditional healer by her mother; as a result she became one of the primary law women in the community. At a young age, she married Purungu Tjakata Tjapaltjarri, and had two daughters with him. She remained in the Aboriginal community until 1963, when she moved with the community to Balgo, Western Australia. After remarrying in the 1970s, she began working on a Kukatja dictionary alongside other Australian linguists; the work was published in 1992.

Nampitjin began painting in 1986, and her first works were presented at the Art from the Great Sandy Desert exhibition later that year. After the Warlayirti Artists organization was formed, her husband and daughters painted alongside her. Her work Kinyu, created in 1991, was noted by art historians as "metaphor for the surface of her country", as well as exemplifying a transitional period in which she moved away from a style in which dots were preferred to lines. In 1998, she won the Open Painting prize in the National Aboriginal and Torres Strait Islander Art Award.

Later in life, she returned to her native desert homeland, using that as a motif for her artwork. She continued to paint until her death in 2013.
