= Biddy Rockman Napaljarri =

Australian artist

- Born: c. 1940 (age 85–86); Tanami Downs, Northern Territory
- Known for: Painting
- Relatives: Mona Rockman Napaljarri; Peggy Rockman Napaljarri

Biddy Rockman Napaljarri (born c. 1940) is a Walpiri-speaking Indigenous artist from Australia's Western Desert region. She has been painting since 1986, and her work is in the collection of the National Gallery of Victoria.

== Life ==
Biddy Rockman Napaljarri is a Walpiri-speaking Indigenous artist from the Western Desert region. Biddy Rockman Napaljarri should not be confused with artist Biddy Napaljarri White (born 1952).

'Napaljarri' (in Warlpiri) or 'Napaltjarri' (in Western Desert dialects) is a skin name, one of sixteen used to denote the subsections or subgroups in the kinship system of central Australian Indigenous people. These names define kinship relationships that influence preferred marriage partners and may be associated with particular totems. Although they may be used as terms of address, they are not surnames in the sense used by Europeans. Thus 'Biddy Rockman' is the element of the artist's name that is specifically hers.

Biddy was born circa 1940 in the area of Mongrel Downs station in Western Australia, The ambiguity around the year of birth is in part because Indigenous Australians operate using a different conception of time, often estimating dates through comparisons with the occurrence of other events. Mongrel Downs station was renamed Tanami Downs at the time of it being returned to Indigenous ownership in the 1990s. The area lies in the north-west of the Northern Territory, on the Western Australian border.

Biddy was one of six children of Milkila Jungarayi, and her siblings include artists Mona Rockman Napaljarri and Peggy Rockman Napaljarri. Biddy Rockman is one of the traditional owners recognised in the Tanami Downs land claim, under the Aboriginal Land Rights Act 1976. By 2004 she was living in Katherine, Northern Territory.

== Art ==
=== Background ===
Contemporary Indigenous art of the western desert began when Indigenous men at Papunya began painting in 1971, assisted by teacher Geoffrey Bardon. Their work, which used acrylic paints to create designs representing body painting and ground sculptures, rapidly spread across Indigenous communities of central Australia, particularly following the commencement of a government-sanctioned art program in central Australia in 1983. By the 1980s and 1990s, such work was being exhibited internationally. The first artists, including all of the founders of the Papunya Tula artists' company, had been men, and there was resistance amongst the Pintupi men of central Australia to women painting. However, there was also a desire amongst many of the women to participate, and in the 1990s large numbers of them began to create paintings. In the western desert communities such as Kintore, Yuendumu, Balgo, and on the outstations, people were beginning to create art works expressly for exhibition and sale.

=== Career ===
Biddy Rockman began painting at Lajamanu, Northern Territory, in the central desert, west of Tennant Creek, in 1986. Western Desert artists such as Biddy will frequently paint particular 'dreamings', or stories, for which they have personal responsibility or rights. Johnson's biographical survey of artists in 1994 identified her country as Jarlawangu, and that she painted Ngatijirri (budgerigar) and Warna dreamings, stories that belong to Napaljarri and Nungarrayi women.

Works by Biddy Rockman are held by major institutions, including the National Gallery of Victoria. They are also represented in major private collections, such as Nangara (also known as the Ebes Collection).

== Collections ==
- National Gallery of Victoria
- Ebes Collection
