= Peggy Napangardi Jones =

Australian artist (1951–2014)

Peggy Napangardi Jones or Peggy Jones (1951 – 20 August 2014) was a Warlpiri/ Warumungu woman born at Phillip Creek Station near Tennant Creek, Northern Territory, Australia. She was a significant Australian Aboriginal artist who had 10 solo shows and approximately 50 group exhibitions. She was also selected in the Telstra National Aboriginal & Torres Strait Islander Art Awards and acquired by many national and international collections.

== Life and painting ==
Jones was born at Phillip Creek Station to a Warlpiri mother and a Warumungu father and, from them, she inherited dreamtime stories and laws; these form her inspiration to paint. In her early years her family walked from Phillip Creek Station to Brunchilly Station, where her mother worked as a servant and her father was mostly absent, and, for most of her early life, they travelled between here and Banka Banka Station. This continued until, as a young woman, the family travelled to Alekerenge (also known as Ali Curung) where she met and married a Warumungu man. Following their marriage, in 1970, the couple moved to Tennant Creek, where they lived at village camp, where their 3 children (Wayne, Jessica and Joshua) were born.

Jones was introduced to acrylic painting on canvas in 1996 at a Julalikara CDEP Women's Arts and Craft program at the 'Pink Palace' (Julalikari Arts) in Tennant Creek. Her first paintings were in the classic 'dot and circle' style and relate strongly to her country; soakages, wells, bush tucker, animals and birds. Jones works are highly coloured and have ostensibly loose compositions but their colours and strengths make them strong, fresh and vibrant.

Throughout her career Jones had various residencies at Batchelor Institute of Indigenous Tertiary Education and Northern Territory University, now Charles Darwin University and, at these, she learnt to work with a variety of mediums including silk painting, ceramics and lino block printing.

Jones work is held in many important collections and major institutions including:

- The National Gallery of Victoria; Ian Potter Centre
- National Gallery of Australia
- Art Gallery and Museum of the Northern Territory; Parliament Collection
- Northern Land Council; Native Title Collection
- The Burkhardt-Felder Foundation Collection

Jones, who called herself "the artist of all time", was represented by the Alcaston Gallery in Melbourne throughout her career until her retirement in 2011.

Jones died on 20 August 2014.

== See also ==
- Art of Australia
