= Lily Kelly Napangardi =

Australian artist (born c. 1948)

- Born: c. 1948; Haasts Bluff region, Northern Territory, Australia
- Known for: Painting
- Movement: Contemporary Aboriginal Australian art

Lily Kelly Napangardi (born c. 1948) is a distinguished contemporary Aboriginal Australian artist from Watiyawanu in the Northern Territory, whose paintings are of her country.

Kelly was born in the Haasts Bluff region of the Northern Territory of Australia. In her earlier years, Kelly lived with her family at the settlement of Papunya, but later moved to Watiyawanu (Mount Liebig – 325 km west of Alice Springs) (with her husband Norman Kelly, also an artist). Kelly is a respected senior law woman of her community of Watiyawanu, and the custodian over the Women's Dreamtime stories associated with Kunajarrayi.

Lily Kelly Napangardi began painting in the early 1980s. She won the Northern Territory Art Award for Excellence in Aboriginal Painting in 1986 and was a finalist in the Telstra National Aboriginal and Torres Strait Islander Art Award in 2003. In January 2006, she was named as one of Australia's 50 most collectable artists by Australian Art Collector magazine.

Kelly's paintings are of her country, especially of the sand hills (Tali) around Mount Liebig. They are usually done in white (sometimes, red or yellow) dots on black background, presenting an almost three-dimensional illusion of space and depth. Some rarer examples of her work are painted in two colours (mainly white and red) on black background. Today Lily Kelly Napangardi's art is recognised as some of the most innovative in the contemporary Aboriginal art scene. It is highly sought after by museums and private collectors worldwide.

Her name is sometimes incorrectly spelt 'Lilly', with double L, but the artist signs her work as 'LILY Kelly'.

== Collections ==
- Musée du quai Branly, Paris
- The Kelton Foundation, Santa Monica (USA)
- Gallery Anthony Curtis, Cambridge, MA (USA)
- The Thomas Vroom Collection, Amsterdam (NL)
- Groninger Museum, The Netherlands
- The National Gallery of Australia, Canberra
- Art Gallery of New South Wales, Sydney
- Queensland Art Gallery, Brisbane
- Art Gallery of South Australia, Adelaide
- National Gallery of Victoria, Melbourne
- Museum and Art Gallery of the Northern Territory, Darwin
- The Kerry Stokes Collection
- The Holmes à Court Collection, Perth
- Artbank, Sydney
- The Herbert F. Johnson Museum of Art, Ithaca, NY (USA)
