= Anniebell Marrngamarrnga =

Aboriginal Australian artist

- Born: December 31, 1967 (age 58); Maningrida, Northern Territory, Australia
- Known for: Fibre Sculpture, Contemporary Indigenous Australian Art
- Style: Contemporary Fibre Sculpture
- Spouse: Dick Nadjolorro

Anniebell Marrngamarrnga is an Aboriginal Australian artist from Maningrida in the Northern Territory of Australia. She is well known for her large-scale, intricate fibre sculptures.

== Biography ==
Anniebell Marrngamarrnga was born in Maningrida on December 31, 1967. She is part of the Kuninjku language group of the Darnkolo clan of the Yirridjdja moiety.

She learned to weave from her mother, Nancy Djulumba, who died in 1995. She started out making coiled baskets, twined bags, and string bags. She later learned to paint from her husband, Dick Nadjolorro.

Fibre sculpture among Kuninjku women was largely pioneered in the early 2000s by Marina Murdilnga, daughter of bark painter Mick Kubarrku. After learning weaving from her mother, she invented a new form of flat fibre sculptures made with a knotting technique. Murdilnga’s work was well-received and it inspired other Kuninjku women to pursue similar work.

Anniebell Marrngamarrnga began experimenting with fibre sculptures in the early 2000s. Her favorite subject is the yawkyawk, a female spirit who lives in the water. The Yawkyawk spirit lives in freshwater streams and pools in Western Arnhem Land. They are depicted as part-woman and part-fish, with long hair and a fishlike tail. They are often compared to the European idea of a mermaid.

The yawkyawk spirit in Marrngamarrnga’s work is one that lives in a waterhold at Kubumi, near the Mann River. This Dreaming belongs to her husband.

She begins by building a bamboo frame in the shape of the yawkyawk. She then weaves the fibre into the shape of the figure. The fibre usually used in weaving is pandanus (Pandanus spiralis). Women are generally responsible for the labor-intensive task of collecting and preparing the fibres. After the monsoon season, new leaf growth is harvested from the top of the pandanus tree. Various plants, berries, and barks are collected and prepared to be used as dyes. The pandanus strips are soaked in containers of warm dye for several hours if not days, and then hung out to dry in the sun. This entire process takes several days and requires patience and skill.

Anniebell Marrngamarrnga now lives and works in Maningrida with her husband, Dick Nadjolorro. She continues to create fibre sculptures of the yawkyawk and is known as an accomplished artist, both in the community, nationally, and internationally.

== Career ==
Anniebell Marrngamarrnga’s work has brought fibre sculpture to a new level. She uses vibrant colors in each section of the yawkyawk’s body, and her sculptures are especially large and complex.

Her work is featured in several collections and has been shown in many exhibitions, both nationally and internationally.

=== Exhibitions ===
==== Solo ====
- 2009- Anniebell Marrngamarrnga & Tjanpi Desert Weavers, Michael Reid at Elizabeth Bay, Sydney, NSW
- 2008- Anniebell Marrngamarrnga, William Mora Galleries, Melbourne, VIC
- 2007- Anniebell Marrngamarrnga, William Mora Galleries, Melbourne, VIC

==== Group ====
- 2020- RESILIENCE: The power of the past today - Maningrida, Aboriginal Signature Estrangin Fine Art, Brussels, Belgium
- 2020- Kun-waral Spirit Shadows, Salon Project Space, Darwin
- 2018- Mardayin, Art Kelch, Freiburg, Germany
- 2018- Djang in Fibre: From Bim to Form, Aboriginal & Pacific Art Gallery, Waterloo, NSW
- 2018- Barring-bul (Many Walks), Trinity Gallery, University of Melbourne
- 2017- 34th National Aboriginal & Torres Strait Arts Awards, Museum and Art Gallery of the Northern Territory, Darwin, NT
- 2017- Into the Water curated by Maningrida Arts & Culture, Tactile Arts, Darwin, NT
- 2016- Whos Afraid of Colour?, National Gallery of Victoria, Melbourne, VIC
- 2014- Mayh, Body & Spirit in Kunwinjku Fibre Art, Aboriginal & Pacific Art Gallery, Sydney, NSW
- 2012- Maningrida – contemporary work from arnhem land, Gallery Ecosse, Sydney, NSW
- 2012- Dream Catchers, Coo-ee Aboriginal Art Gallery, Sydney
- 2011- The Dreaming Changes Shape, Gabrielle Pizzi, Melbourne, Australia
- 2011- Lovelace, Powerhouse, Sydney, Australia
- 2010- Best of Maningrida, Annandale Galleries, Sydney, Australia
- 2009- Beautiful Beasts, Museum & Art Gallery of the Northern Territory, Darwin, NT
- 2009- Maningrida Group Show, Maningrida Arts & Culture Gallery, Darwin, NT
- 2009- Orche - A Study in Materiality, Short Street Gallery, Broome, WA
- 2009- Survey from Maningrida Arts & Culture, The Mossenson Gallery, Perth, WA
- 2009- Togart Contemporary Art Award, The Toga Group, NT
- 2009- Pandanus Spiralis, Aboriginal & Pacific Art Gallery, Sydney, NSW
- 2008- Lost & Found, Tarrawarra Biennial
- 2008- Womens show, Vivien Anderson Gallery, Melbourne, VIC
- 2008- Palya Art at Mary Place, Mary Place, Sydney, NSW
- 2008- Interwoven, Indigenart, Perth, WA
- 2008- Melbourne Art Fair, Art Fair, William Mora Galleries, Melbourne
- 2007- Culture Warriors, National Gallery of Australia, Canberra, ACT
- 2007- Selected new works from Maningrida, Maningrida Arts & Culture, Darwin
- 2007- 24th Telstra National & Torres Strait Islander Art Award Exhibition, Museum & Art Gallery of the Northern Territory, Darwin, NT
- 2007- Womens show, Vivien Anderson Gallery, Melbourne, VIC
- 2006- 23rd Telstra National & Torres Strait Islander Art Award Exhibition, Museum & Art Gallery of the Northern Territory, Darwin, NT
- 2003- Weave, Federation Centre for the Arts, Bundoora Homestead, VIC

=== Collections ===
- National Gallery of Australia, Canberra, Australia
- Museum and Art Gallery of the Northern Territory, Darwin, Australia
- The Toga Group Collection, Australia
- Aimee Proost Private Collection, Queensland, Australia
- Axel Arnott Collection
- Charles Darwin University Art Collection, Darwin, Australia
