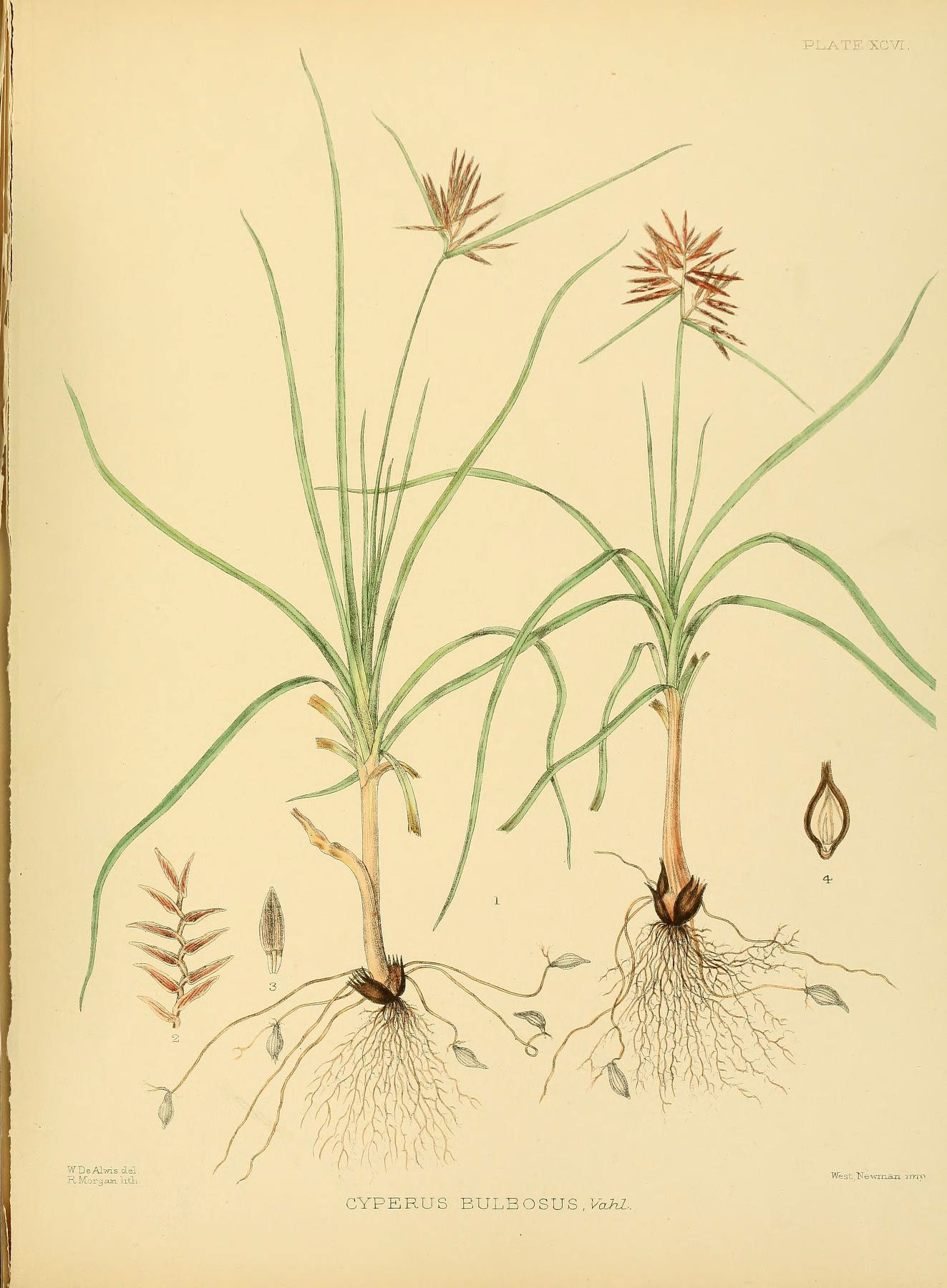

Scientific classification
- Kingdom: Plantae
- Clade: Tracheophytes
- Clade: Angiosperms
- Clade: Monocots
- Clade: Commelinids
- Order: Poales
- Family: Cyperaceae
- Genus: Cyperus
- Species: C. bulbosus

Binomial name
- Cyperus bulbosus Vahl

= Cyperus bulbosus =

Species of plant

Cyperus bulbosus is a species of sedge found across Africa, the Middle East, Indian subcontinent, Southeast Asia, and Australia. In Australia, it is commonly called Nalgoo or (Australian) bush onion or "wild onion", but is not related to the onion or other Alliaceae. It is a component of Australian bushfood, but is considered an agricultural weed in other areas.

== Description ==
=== Morphology ===
Cyperus bulbosus is a perennial sedge. Typically green to straw in colour, the slender plant propagates via rhizomes (horizontal, underground stem extensions), ending at bulbs. Approximately 20–40 cm in height (approx. 8-16 inches), it has fragments (or culms) as long as its leaves (which are typically 1-2mm wide).

Stems are known as triquetrous/trigonous (i.e. rounded-triangle shaped cross-section). Its flower bundle (i.e. inflorescence) is much longer than the leaves. Flowers appear as “spikes” that can extend up to approximately 5 cm. They consist of involucre bracts, meaning that a collection of leaf and petal-like extensions support the flower (just beneath the petals).

Spikelets (i.e. arrangement of the flowers/florets) of the plant appear flattened. Each “spike” contains approximately 10-30 spikelets which are 10-25mm long. Usually, five to 20 of these are flowered. Lastly, glumes (membranous bracts) subacute (slightly rounded), with 3-5 nerves on either side of the keel, which in itself is approximately 3–5 mm long.

Leaves are known to be trigonous, obovoid or ellipsoid. They are approximately 1.3 to 1.55 mm long.

== Taxonomy ==
The species was first formally described by the botanist Martin Vahl in 1805 as a part of the work Enumeratio Plantarum. It has four synonyms; Cyperus subulatus var. confertus Benth. in 1878, Cyperus bulbosus var. elatior by Kük. in 1936, Cyperus andrewsii by C.B.Clarke in 1908 and Cyperus bulbosus Vahl var. bulbosus by Kük. in 1936.

== Ecology ==
A 12-year study, assessing the diet of Central Australian camels, found that Cyperus bulbosus was a common food plant as indicated by a "palatability index" score of 3. The index ranges from 1 ("only eaten when nothing else is available") to 7 ("could be killed by camel browsing"). The Raso lark, endemic to the Cape Verde Islands, is heavily dependent on Cyperus bulbosus for food. In addition, Cyperus bulbosus is a well-established threat/pest to rice plantations. It has a particular impact on rice crop cultivation, in agriculture; competing for nutrients in spaces that may already be finite in supply.

Other animals, such as the bilby and brolga are documented to include Cyperus bulbosus in their diets.

Furthermore, Cyperus bulbosus has competitive relationships with couch grass and buffelgrass.

== Cultural significance ==
Its name in the Arrernte language of Central Australia is merne yalke. In a neighbouring language, Kaytetye, it is called erreyakwerra. Some Kaytetye, the Kwerrimpe women, have a bush onion dreaming which involves the bush onion and the origins of the Kaytetye people and language. This means they have been given stories of the origins of the bush onion, and are entitled to tell these stories and paint about them. Artists who have painted bush onion dreaming include Nora Andy Napaltjarri and her sister Ada Andy Napaltjarri.

The small tubers which form on short stolons are a traditional bush tucker food for Australian Aboriginal peoples. They are dug up on creek banks when the grass of the onion has dried out. The husk can also be eaten. They are eaten raw or cooked in the hot earth by the fire and are said to have a "a pleasant nutty taste".

== Distribution ==
Cyperus bulbosus is found in parts of Africa, Australia and Asia. Its habitat is typically notophyll vine forest, eucalypt woodland or chenopod shrubland. Within Australia, the plant has been documented throughout Western Australia, the Northern Territory, and large proportions of inland/central Australia. Beyond these regions, it is also known to grow in Cape York Peninsula (Queensland), North East Queensland and Central East Queensland. Due to invasive couch and buffel grass, Cyperus bulbosus numbers are known to be declining, particularly in central Australia, with reports that they may face eventual extinction.

== See also ==
- List of Cyperus species
- Indigenous Australian food groups
