= Balgo Hill Airport =

- IATA: BQW; ICAO: YBGO

Summary
- Airport type: Public
- Operator: Wirrimanu Aboriginal Community
- Location: Balgo, Western Australia
- Elevation AMSL: 1,440 ft / 439 m
- Coordinates: 20°08′54″S 127°58′24″E

Map
- Location in Western Australia

Runways
Direction	Length		Surface
Direction	m	ft	Surface
04/22	692	2,270	Gravel
15/33	1,610	5,282	Gravel
- Sources: Australian AIP and aerodrome chart

Balgo Hill Airport (IATA: BQW, ICAO: YBGO) is located 1 nautical mile (1.9 km; 1.2 mi) south of Balgo, Western Australia.

== See also ==
- List of airports in Western Australia
- Aviation transport in Australia
