= Helen Nelson Napaljarri =

Walpiri-speaking Aboriginal artist

- Born: Helen Nelson c. 1949; Northern Territory, Australia
- Other names: Helen White Napajarri; Helen Spencer Napaljarri
- Citizenship: Australia
- Occupations: Aboriginal artist, literacy worker, author
- Years active: 1980s–present
- Known for: Western Desert painting; bilingual Walpiri–English literature
- Notable work: Ngarlkirdi (witchetty grub) and Wardapi (goanna) Dreaming paintings
- Movement: Western Desert art

Helen Nelson Napaljarri (born c. 1949), also known as Helen White Napajarri or Helen Spencer Napaljarri, is a Walpiri-speaking Aboriginal artist from Australia's Western Desert region. A literacy worker in Yuendumu, Northern Territory, Napaljarri began painting with Warlukurlangu Artists in the 1980s. Her paintings are held by the Art Gallery of South Australia and South Australian Museum. She has contributed to several bilingual language books in Walpiri and English.

== Life ==
Helen was born circa 1949. The ambiguity around the year of birth is in part because Indigenous Australians operate using a different conception of time, often estimating dates through comparisons with the occurrence of other events. 'Napaljarri' (in Warlpiri) or 'Napaltjarri' (in Western Desert dialects) is a skin name, one of sixteen used to denote the subsections or subgroups in the kinship system of central Australian Indigenous people. These names define kinship relationships that influence preferred marriage partners and may be associated with particular totems. Although they may be used as terms of address, they are not surnames in the sense used by Europeans. Thus 'Helen Nelson' is the element of the artist's name that is specifically hers.

She worked in Yuendumu, Northern Territory as a teaching assistant and literacy worker, and it was there that she first painted in the 1980s, with Warlukurlangu Artists.

== Art and writing ==
=== Background ===
Contemporary Indigenous art of the western desert began when Indigenous men at Papunya began painting in 1971, assisted by teacher Geoffrey Bardon. Their work, which used acrylic paints to create designs representing body painting and ground sculptures, rapidly spread across Indigenous communities of central Australia, particularly following the commencement of a government-sanctioned art program in central Australia in 1983. By the 1980s and 1990s, such work was being exhibited internationally. The first artists, including all of the founders of the Papunya Tula artists' company, had been men, and there was resistance amongst the Pintupi men of central Australia to women painting. However, there was also a desire amongst many of the women to participate, and in the 1990s large numbers of them began to create paintings. In the western desert communities such as Kintore, Yuendumu, Balgo, and on the outstations, people were beginning to create art works expressly for exhibition and sale.

=== Career ===
Western Desert artists such as Helen will frequently paint particular 'dreamings', or stories, for which they have personal responsibility or rights, which in Helen's case include Ngarlkirdi (witchetty grub) and Wardapi (goanna) dreamings. Her paintings have been exhibited in the United States, and are held in the collections of the South Australian Museum and Art Gallery.

Helen Nelson is one of a group of authors who wrote bilingual works in Walpiri and English for the Bilingual Resources Development Unit. In 1984 she co-wrote Nyurruwiyi kuja kalalu-jana mardarnu pirltirrka = Childbirth in the old days. She also worked on literature to assist teaching English as a second language to Aboriginal children, collaborating on The python who went in search of a burrow and A Frightening Sight, both published in 1985.

== Collections ==
- Art Gallery of South Australia
- South Australian Museum
