= Susie Bootja Bootja Napaltjarri =

Australian artist (c. 1935–2003)

- Born: c.1935 Kurtal, south-west of Balgo, Western Australia
- Died: 16 January 2003
- Known for: Painting

Susie Bootja Bootja Napaltjarri (also referred to as Susie Bootja Bootja Napangardi, Napangarti, or Napangati) (c. 1935 – 16 January 2003) was an Australian Indigenous artist from the Western Desert region. Born south-west of Balgo, Western Australia, in the 1950s Susie Bootja Bootja married artist Mick Gill Tjakamarra, with whom she had a son, Matthew Gill Tjupurrula (also an artist).

Susie Bootja Bootja's painting career followed the establishment of Warlayirti Artists, an Indigenous art centre at Balgo. One of the area's strongest artists, her work was characterised by an expressive style, and has been acquired by major Australian galleries, including the Art Gallery of New South Wales and National Gallery of Victoria. She died in 2003.

== Life ==
Susie Bootja Bootja was born circa 1935 (Note: Johnson's reference work gives a date of 1932 the National Gallery of Victoria suggests 1935, while the Oxford Companion to Aboriginal art and culture suggests 1936.) near Kurtal, or Helena Spring, south-west of Balgo, Western Australia; the country is called Kaningarra in her own language, a name that appears as the title of one of her art works. The ambiguity around the year of birth is in part because Indigenous Australians operate using a different conception of time, often estimating dates through comparisons with the occurrence of other events. While sources vary as to Susie's skin name (some indicating Napangarti, others Napaltjarri), the similar birth dates, locations, and work history indicate that all are referring to the one individual.

'Napaljarri' (in Warlpiri) or 'Napaltjarri' (in Western Desert dialects) is a skin name, one of sixteen used to denote the subsections or subgroups in the kinship system of central Australian Indigenous people. These names define kinship relationships that influence preferred marriage partners and may be associated with particular totems. Although they may be used as terms of address, they are not surnames in the sense used by Europeans. Thus 'Susie Bootja Bootja' is the element of the artist's name that is specifically hers.

Susie Bootja Bootja was of the Kukatja language group. She married artist Mick Gill Tjakamarra at Old Balgo in the 1950s, and they had a son, Matthew Gill Tjupurrula (born 1960), who also became an artist. Susie Bootja Bootja died on 16 January 2003.

== Art ==
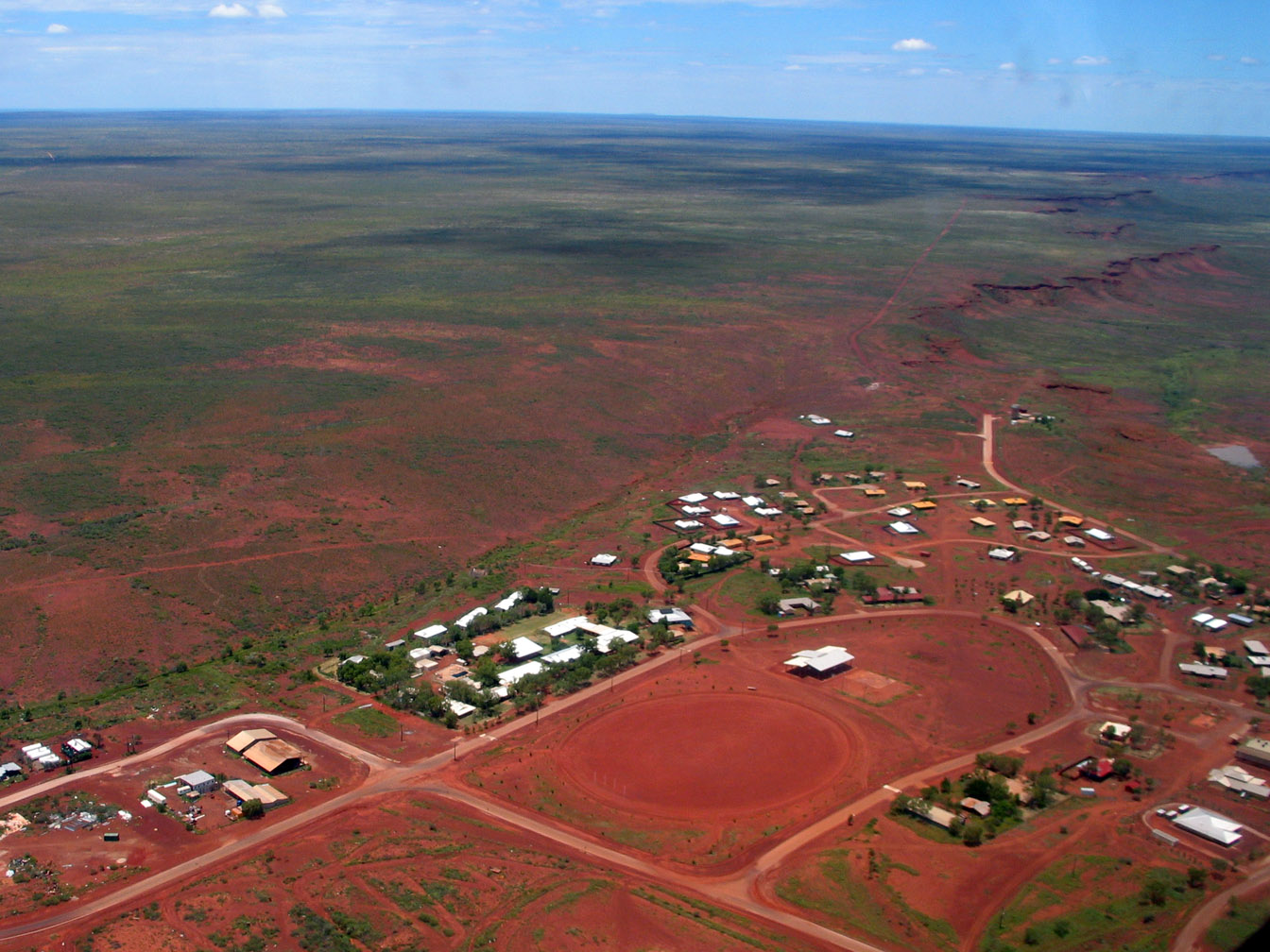
Balgo, Western Australia, where Susie Bootja Bootja lived and worked

=== Background ===
Contemporary Indigenous art of the western desert began when Indigenous men at Papunya began painting in 1971, assisted by teacher Geoffrey Bardon. Their work, which used acrylic paints to create designs representing body painting and ground sculptures, rapidly spread across Indigenous communities of central Australia, particularly following the commencement of a government-sanctioned art program in central Australia in 1983. By the 1980s and 1990s, such work was being exhibited internationally. The first artists, including all of the founders of the Papunya Tula artists' company, had been men, and there was resistance amongst the Pintupi men of central Australia to women painting. However, there was also a desire amongst many of the women to participate, and in the 1990s large numbers of them began to create paintings. In the western desert communities such as Kintore, Yuendumu, Balgo, and on the outstations, people were beginning to create art works expressly for exhibition and sale. Art centres were important to this widespread creation of art works.

=== Career ===
The Balgo community did not establish an art centre for more than ten years after their colleagues at Papunya, with artistic activities commencing when an adult education centre was opened in 1981. However once Warlayirti Artists was set up, the community went on to become one of Australia's most successful Indigenous art centres. Painting at the centre is a sociable, communal activity, and Susie Bootja Bootja would regularly collaborate with other painters, including her husband.

Susie Bootja Bootja was represented by Warlayirti artists at Balgo, where she was living and working in the 1990s. She was one of the strongest painters at Balgo. The work of Balgo artists such as Susie Bootja Bootja, and her fellow artists including Sunfly Tjampitjin and Wimmitji Tjapangarti, are characterised by an expressive style, involving "linked dotting and blurred forms and edges".

Works by Susie Bootja Bootja are held by the Art Gallery of New South Wales, the National Gallery of Victoria, and the Flinders University Art Museum Collection. She is also represented in major private collections, such as Nangara (also known as the Ebes Collection), the Holmes à Court Collection and the Morven Estate. Works by both Susie Bootja Bootja and her husband were included in a 1991 exhibition 'Yapa: Peintres Aborigenes de Balgo et Lajamanu' in Paris, and in 'Daughters of the Dreaming' at the Art Gallery of Western Australia in 1997. Her paintings feature in Christine Watson's 2003 book, Piercing the Ground: Balgo Women's Image Making and Relationship to Country.

Susie Bootja Bootja helped choose the site for, and participated in, a major ceremony for a 1993 Australian Broadcasting Corporation documentary film, Milli Milli. The ceremony, called Wati Kutjarra (Two men) Dreaming, was performed with others including fellow artist Peggy Rockman Napaljarri.

== Collections ==
- Art Gallery of New South Wales
- Flinders University Art Museum Collection
- National Gallery of Victoria
- Kluge-Ruhe Aboriginal Art Collection, University of Virginia
- Holmes à Court collection
