= Louisa Napaljarri =

Australian artist (1930–2001)

- Born: c.1930 Ngarrupalya, west of Yuendumu, Northern Territory, Australia
- Died: 2001; Lajamanu, Northern Territory
- Known for: Painting

Louisa Lawson Napaljarri (Pupiya) (c. 1930–2001) was a Warlpiri-speaking Indigenous artist from Australia's Western Desert region. Louisa commenced painting at Lajamanu, Northern Territory in 1986. Her work is held by the National Gallery of Victoria.

== Life ==
Louisa Lawson Napaljarri was born circa 1926 or 1931. The ambiguity around the year of birth is in part because Indigenous Australians operate using a different conception of time, often estimating dates through comparisons with the occurrence of other events.

'Napaljarri' (in Warlpiri) or 'Napaltjarri' (in Western Desert dialects) is a skin name, one of sixteen used to denote the subsections or subgroups in the kinship system of central Australian Indigenous people. These names define kinship relationships that influence preferred marriage partners and may be associated with particular totems. Although they may be used as terms of address, they are not surnames in the sense used by Europeans. Thus 'Louisa Lawson' is the element of the artist's name that is specifically hers.

As a child, Louisa lived around Ngarrupalya, west of Yuendumu and over three hundred kilometres north-west of Alice Springs. Her first contact with white Australians was at Alice Springs. She worked as a cook at Granites, a Northern Territory goldmine, and her daughter by one of the miners, Robyn Napurrula Green, is also an artist. Louisa herself was the sister of prominent Yuendumu artist Paddy Japaljarri Sims.

Louisa was a "senior woman in the ceremonial life of the Lajamanu community". She died in 2001.

== Art ==
=== Background ===
Contemporary Indigenous art of the western desert began when Indigenous men at Papunya began painting in 1971, assisted by teacher Geoffrey Bardon. Their work, which used acrylic paints to create designs representing body painting and ground sculptures, rapidly spread across Indigenous communities of central Australia, particularly following the commencement of a government-sanctioned art program in central Australia in 1983. By the 1980s and 1990s, such work was being exhibited internationally. The first artists, including all of the founders of the Papunya Tula artists' company, had been men, and there was resistance amongst the Pintupi men of central Australia to women painting. However, there was also a desire amongst many of the women to participate, and in the 1990s large numbers of them began to create paintings. In the western desert communities such as Kintore, Yuendumu, Balgo, and on the outstations, people were beginning to create art works expressly for exhibition and sale.

=== Career ===
Louisa Lawson was one of a number of artists who first learned painting through a course run in 1986 at Lajamanu, Northern Territory by an adult education officer, John Quinn, associated with the local Technical and Further Education unit. The course, initially attended only by men, eventually enrolled over a hundred community members. Others who began their careers through that course include Mona Napaljarri and Peggy Rockman Napaljarri. In the 1990s she was "one of the best known painters at Lajamanu".

Works by Louisa are held by the National Gallery of Victoria, which included her works in its 1989 Mythscapes and 1991 Paint Up Big exhibitions.

== Collections ==
- National Gallery of Victoria
