= Billy Tjampitjinpa Kenda =

Australian Aboriginal artist

Billy Tjampitjinpa Kenda or Billy Kenda (born c. 1967) is an Australian Pitjantjatjara and Luritja artist, with a disability, who works with Bindi Mwerre Anthurre Artists based in Alice Springs (Mparntwe).

== Life and painting ==
Kenda was born in Jay Creek (Iwupataka), just outside of Alice Springs, in the Tjoritja/West MacDonnell Ranges and its sights and scenery are seen in much of his work. He demonstrates a strong connection to the land in his paintings.

He was taught to paint by his grandfather when he was a young boy and his mother, who was also a painter, also taught him.

== Achievements ==
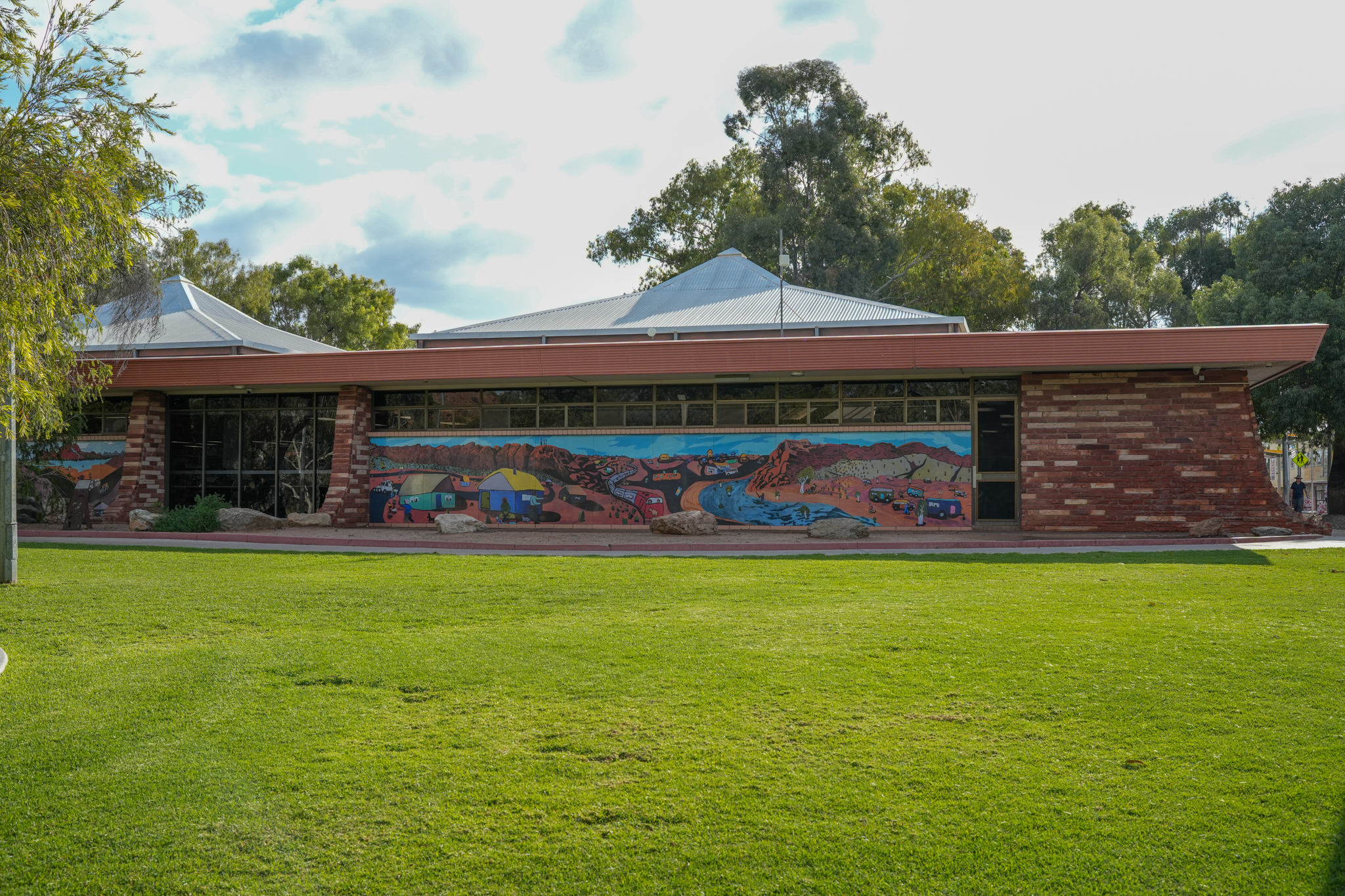
A view of Kenda's artwork on the side of the Alice Springs Public Library; 2024

Kenda began painting for Bindi Mwerre Anthurre Artists in 2004 and he has developed a distinct graphic style of painting. He draws much of his inspiration from the increasing population and traffic within the region and often features truck, cars, aeroplanes and helicopters into his work. Kenda also regularly features scenes from remote communities and town camps. His style is known for being playful and evocative and showing off scenes unique to Central Australia.

He has been featured in many exhibitions held by Bindi Mwerre Anthurre Artists as well as in Desert Mob and the Darwin Aboriginal Art Fair. In 2014 he was also featured in the Artbank exhibition Loose Canon which aimed to feature an alternative canon of work by well regarded artists who are often left out of recent histories of art; another Central Australian artist featured in this exhibition was Vincent Namatjira.

Artbank also hold his painting 'A busy day in Central Australia, 2013' in their collection.

Two pieces of his work are featured in a public art display on the external walls of the Alice Springs Public Library. These are entitle "All Them Tourists Goin’ to Look at Countryside" and "Lookin’ Through Gap at Alice Springs Town" and they were installed in 2020 with funds made available from Arts NT. Together the works are 22 metres long.
