= Billy Benn Perrurle =

Australian Alyawarre artist (c. 1943–2012)

Billy Benn Perrurle or Billy Benn (c. 1943 – 14 October 2012) was an Alyawarre landscape artist, with a disability, who worked with the Bindi Mwerre Anthurre Artists. His paintings celebrate the land of his people, near Harts Range in the Northern Territory of Australia and his personal knowledge of it.

== Life and painting ==
Benn was born in Artetyerre (Harts Range) to an Alyawarre father and an Akarre mother. Benn learned to paint as a teenager, first from his sisters Ally and Gladdy on skin and then, as he remembers, from a 'Chinese lady'. Benn's father, Jimmy Kemerre, must have also been involved in teaching his son as he was also an artist; most known for creating beautiful traditional artefacts; including boomerangs and spears.

In his youth, starting around the age of 10, Benn worked around Central Australia for a number on mining companies, including the Harts Range Mica Field and the Arltunga Goldfields (now Arltunga Historical Reserve), mostly in the employ of Simon Rieff. During this period Benn remembered working with a lot of Italian migrants and fondly remembered lunches of spaghetti; saying "good food, those Italian people". Benn was not paid for his work and, instead received food and clothing.

Following this period, at an unknown date, Benn began working at a series of cattle stations in the region where he pumped water for cattle, drove sheep and cattle across country and became an experienced Aboriginal tracker. Again, in these roles, he was unpaid.

On 5 August 1967, Benn fatally shot former colleague Harry Neale 14 times while he was sleeping in his swag nearby the Hart Range racecourse. After the shooting Benn, along with 16 family members, went into hiding in the nearby ranges and, in the subsequent manhunt, he wounded two policemen and spent two weeks in hiding. Ultimately he was found by tracker Ted Egan; assisted by Sonny Woods and a young boy known only as William.

Later Benn was acquitted of the charges of murder, on the grounds of insanity as he had schizophrenia, and served 15 years in jail and 2 years in a mental health institution in Adelaide where he started painting on whatever he could find. Benn always remembered Albert Namatjira, who he once met with his "flash shirt, good hat and big truck" as an inspiration.

In 1981 Benn returned to Central Australia, to the regional centre Alice Springs, where he started working for Bindi Inc., an organisation established to provide employment opportunities, support and advocacy for people with a disability, where he worked constructing metal boxes. In the 1990s, during his breaks, Benn began painting on off-cuts of timber and metal and, in doing so, begun to map out his father's country; which he had not seen since his arrest. Benn's clear talent lead to Bindi Mwerre Anthurre Artists being founded around him in 2000.

At Bindi Mwerre Anthurre Artists Benn's painting remained true to their origins, in the workshop, and were often created on salvaged timber and he often fostered the talents of his fellow artists; including Aileen Oliver and Seth Namatjira.

In 2009, in his seventies and his health deteriorating, Benn and Catherine Peattie, started working on a book about his life and art and Benn was finally able to return to Harts Range, which he hadn't seen in 40 years. This book, Billy Benn, was released in 2011.

Benn died on 14 October 2012 and his funeral was held, in Alice Springs, on 26 October 2012.

== Achievements ==
Benn's work is held in major national and international galleries and private collections and has risen to national prominence.

He is also:

- Winner of the 34th The Alice Prize in 2006.
- Included in the National Gallery of Victoria 'Landmarks' exhibition in 2007.
- Selected for Australian Art Collectors magazine's 2007 list of fifty most collectable artists.

== See also ==
- Art of Australia
