= Tanami Downs =

Cattle station in the Northern Territory of Australia

Coordinates: 20°33′54″S 129°43′25″E

Location in Northern Territory

Tanami Downs (formerly Mongrel Downs) is an Indigenous Australian-owned cattle station in the Northern Territory of Australia.

== Geography ==
Tanami Downs station covers approximately 4,200 square kilometres (1,600 sq mi) of the Northern Territory, about 650 kilometres (400 mi) north-west of Alice Springs.

Tanami Downs lies within the Tanami bioregion of hot, dry country, in which the dominant vegetation is spinifex hummock grassland. Though drought-prone and semi-arid, Tanami Downs has some mountainous areas with permanent water, and its northern parts have plains suitable for cattle grazing.

== History and administration ==
Indigenous ownership of Tanami Downs was recognised through the Tanami Downs Land Claim. The claim was lodged in June 1989, and the report under the Aboriginal Land Rights Act 1976 recognising the claim, was delivered in early 1992. Title to the land was officially handed to the traditional owners on 21 December 1992.

The land is owned by the Mungkurrupa Land Trust, which represents the traditional owners, while the station is operated by a board comprising a mix of traditional owners, an outside representative of another pastoral station, and an agricultural consultant.

Notable residents (and traditional owners) of Tanami Downs include Indigenous artists Biddy Rockman Napaljarri and Peggy Rockman Napaljarri. It is also where artist and author Kim Mahood grew up, and features heavily in her two biographies Craft for a Dry Lake (2000) and Position Doubtful: mapping landscapes and memories (2016).

== See also ==
- List of ranches and stations
- List of the largest stations in Australia
