= Lucy Napaljarri Kennedy =

Australian artist

Lucy Napaljarri Kennedy AM
- Born: c.1926
- Known for: Painting

Lucy Napaljarri Kennedy AM (born c. 1926) is a Walpiri and Anmatyerre-speaking Indigenous artist from Australia's Western Desert region. One of the first Indigenous women artists to paint in acrylics, her work has been exhibited at major galleries around Australia, and is held in the collection of the National Gallery of Victoria. She was made a Member of the Order of Australia in 1994 for services to the Yuendumu community.

== Life ==
Lucy Napaljarri Kennedy was born circa 1926. The ambiguity around the year of birth is in part because Indigenous Australians operate using a different conception of time, often estimating dates through comparisons with the occurrence of other events.

'Napaljarri' (in Warlpiri) or 'Napaltjarri' (in Western Desert dialects) is a skin name, one of sixteen used to denote the subsections or subgroups in the kinship system of central Australian Indigenous people. These names define kinship relationships that influence preferred marriage partners and may be associated with particular totems. Although they may be used as terms of address, they are not surnames in the sense used by Europeans. Thus 'Lucy Kennedy' is the element of the artist's name that is specifically hers.

Lucy is a senior woman of the community at Yuendumu, Northern Territory and, as well as being a working artist, Lucy has been a member of Yuendumu community council. She was made a Member of the Order of Australia in 1994, for services to the Yuendumu community.

== Art ==
=== Background ===
Contemporary Indigenous art of the western desert began when Indigenous men at Papunya began painting in 1971, assisted by teacher Geoffrey Bardon. Their work, which used acrylic paints to create designs representing body painting and ground sculptures, rapidly spread across Indigenous communities of central Australia, particularly following the commencement of a government-sanctioned art program in central Australia in 1983. By the 1980s and 1990s, such work was being exhibited internationally. The first artists, including all of the founders of the Papunya Tula artists' company, had been men, and there was resistance amongst the Pintupi men of central Australia to women painting. However, there was also a desire amongst many of the women to participate, and in the 1990s large numbers of them began to create paintings. In the western desert communities such as Kintore, Yuendumu, Balgo, and on the outstations, people were beginning to create art works expressly for exhibition and sale.

=== Career ===
Lucy is "one of the first women painters to paint on canvas with acrylics" and her work has been widely exhibited. According to Dussart, the senior women were the first to paint in acrylics at Yuendumu—in 1983, a year before the men. As a senior Yuendumu woman, it is likely that Lucy Kennedy was one of these first painters, though Dussart does not name individuals, instead noting that "30 of the most senior women of the settlement decided to pool their ritual knowledge to produce enough painted objects to purchase a used Toyota Land Cruiser". As well as participating in regular exhibitions at the Araluen Centre for Arts and Entertainment in Alice Springs, Lucy Kennedy's paintings have been part of shows at the South Australian Museum (1988, 1989), the Auckland Art Gallery (1991), and the Museum and Art Gallery of the Northern Territory (2000). Lucy was also a collaborator on the 1997 group work Ngapa Jukurrpa (Water Dreaming), held by the Art Gallery of New South Wales.

As well as painting, Lucy Kennedy has also worked as a printmaker, creating works with the Northern Australia Print Workshop in 2003. These works were titled miinypa jukurrpa, or native red fuchsia dreaming, and examples are held in the collection of the National Gallery of Australia.

Works by Lucy have been collected by the National Gallery of Victoria, and the National Gallery of Australia, which holds a 2003 print by Lucy, miinypa jukurrpa [Native red fuchsia dreaming].

== Collections ==
- Art Gallery of South Australia
- Australian Museum
- Museum of Mankind, British Museum
- Flinders University Art Museum
- Musée national des Arts d'Afrique et d'Océanie
- National Gallery of Australia
- National Gallery of Victoria
- South Australian Museum
