= Bindi Mwerre Anthurre Artists =

Aboriginal Australian art centre in Alice Springs

Bindi Mwerre Anthurre Artists, or Mwerre Anthurre, is an Aboriginal art centre based in Alice Springs (Mparntwe). It was established in 2000 to encourage, nurture and support Aboriginal artists with disabilities and the organisation focuses on empowerment through art.

Artists working with Mwerre Anthurre come from around Central Australia but most live in Alice Springs, often due to the need to access appropriate medical services, and the painting process allows them to express themselves and their connection to their home country.

The Bindi Mwerre Anthurre Artists Art Centre is a member of Desart, the peak Aboriginal arts body for art centres in central Australia. The artists are also members of Viscopy, an artists' copyright agency, and the centre is a member of the Indigenous Art Code which fosters best practice and promotes ethical trading in Indigenous Australian art.

== History ==
Mwerre Anthurre developed out of The Bindi Centre, which opened in 1976 and sought to provide employment and community engagement to people with disabilities. In the 1990s, when working in the workshop, Billy Benn Perrurle started painting on off-cuts of timber and metal and Mwerre Anthurre was founded in order support his talent.

In 2012 Bindi merged with Lifestyle Solutions, which is a major national provider of services to people with disability and children and young people in out-of-home care.

Bindi operates an Australian Disability Enterprise with people who are supported through the National Disability Insurance Scheme. It also receives grants from the Australian Government, the Northern Territory Government and other government agencies. Funds are raised by the sale of work, following commissions given to the artists. Bindi Enterprises is another arm of Bindi that provides contract services and sells workshop products.

In 2011, Mwerre Anthurre won the Northern Territory Chief Minister's Award For Excellence in Inclusive Practice by Aboriginal Arts Centres.

== Exhibitions and critical assessment ==
Artworks produced by the collective's painters hang in public galleries, including the National Gallery of Australia, and have been exhibited nationally. Mwerre Anthurre Artists who have been publicly exhibited include Adrian Robertson and Billy Tjampijinpa Kenda, both selected for inclusion in the 2018 National Aboriginal and Torres Strait Islander Art Award. Robertson won an Alice Springs mayoral award for his artwork undertaken through Mwerre Anthurre, and was also a finalist in The Alice Prize, a central Australian art competition.

Reviewers have commented on the quality of the works of individual artists, linking them to the art collective. Chris Raja observed that the works from Mwerre Anthurre Artists, alongside those from other Desart member art centres, "showed once again that the force of creativity among the original desert-abiding people continues unabated". Reviewing a Melbourne exhibition for The Age, Patrick Hutchings observed "works from Bindi Inc. Mwerre Anthurre Artists, NT...Billy Benn Perrurle, Billy Kenda Tjampitjinpa and Adrian Robertson Jangala, whose Western Perspective views of hills and clouds recall - and in their own way equal - works of early Modernism." Curator Hetti Perkins, in her major review One Sun One Moon, wrote:

"[T]he Mwerre Anthurre artists have forged an idiosyncratic interpretation of the classic landscape genre, envisioning the heart of Australia in calligraphic sweeps that capture a dramatic play of colour and light."

== Artists ==
Mwerre Anthurre has supported many successful artists including;

- Adrian Robertson
- Billy Penn Perrurle
- Billy Tjampijinpa Kenda
- Cathy Peckham
- Charles Inkamala
- Conway Ginger
- Jane Mervin
- Lance James
- Seth Namatjira
- Kukula McDonald

Billy Tjampijinpa Kenda says of himself, and his fellow artists:

“We all paint different places’ stories… Adrian painting some country, Jane, he painting some tjulpu (birds), Conway draws anything - people, faces. Charles draws Hermannsburg, Lance draws horses - maybe from Docker River. I’m painting all them cars. Kukula paints all Cockatoos - he like Cockatoos…”

— Billy Tjampijinpa Kenda, Bindi Enterprises
