= Helicopter Tjungurrayi =

Australian indigenous artist

Helicopter Tjungurrayi (ca 1947) is an Australian indigenous artist.

Tjungurrayi was born around 1947 in Nyakin, south of Puntutjarrpa in the Great Sandy Desert. He is Kukatja. He did not have contact with white people until 1957. That year, he mistakenly drank motor oil for helicopter, fell ill, and the helicopter crew flew him to Balgo for treatment. He later returned to the desert, married Lucy Napanangka Yukenbarri and had eight children.

Tjungurrayi started painting early, together with his wife, however, he has not been a professional artist. After 1994, he developed his personal style, which is to pain desert landscapes with lines using acryl. Tjungurrayi is part of Warlayirti Artists Aboriginal Corporation.

In 2022, he was given The Western Australian State Cultural Treasures Award, in the denomination of Visual Arts.

Tjungurrayi's work is exhibited in various public collections including the Art Gallery of New South Wales.
