= Kitty Pultara Napaljarri =

Australian Indigenous artist

Kitty Pultara Napaljarri (born c. 1930) is an Anmatyerre-speaking Indigenous artist from Australia's Western Desert region. Born at Napperby Station east of Yuendumu, Northern Territory, she worked on the station and first learned to paint there around 1986. Her work is held in the collections of the Art Gallery of South Australia and South Australian Museum.

== Life ==
Kitty Pultara was born on Napperby Station, east of Yuendumu and north-west of Alice Springs in Australia's Northern Territory, around 1925 or on 1 June 1938: the two main reference works give alternative dates. Johnson's 1994 biographical dictionary suggests that she may have been born as early as 1925, while Birnberg's 2004 biographical dictionary gives 1 June 1938. The ambiguity around the year of birth may be in part because Indigenous Australians operate using a different conception of time, often estimating dates through comparisons with the occurrence of other events.

'Napaljarri' (in Warlpiri) or 'Napaltjarri' (in Western Desert dialects) is a skin name, one of sixteen used to denote the subsections or subgroups in the kinship system of central Australian Indigenous people. These names define kinship relationships that influence preferred marriage partners and may be associated with particular totems. Although they may be used as terms of address, they are not surnames in the sense used by Europeans. Thus 'Kitty Pultara' is the element of the artist's name that is specifically hers.

Kitty's close relatives include Clifford Possum Tjapaltjarri and Tim Leura Tjapaltjarri. Her husband is Malcolm Tjampitjinpa, while her daughter Beatrix Dixon Nangala is also an artist. Kitty Pultara worked on Napperby Station as a domestic.

== Art ==
=== Background ===
Contemporary Indigenous art of the western desert began when Indigenous men at Papunya began painting in 1971, assisted by teacher Geoffrey Bardon. Their work, which used acrylic paints to create designs representing body painting and ground sculptures, rapidly spread across Indigenous communities of central Australia, particularly following the commencement of a government-sanctioned art program in central Australia in 1983. By the 1980s and 1990s, such work was being exhibited internationally. The first artists, including all of the founders of the Papunya Tula artists' company, had been men, and there was resistance amongst the Pintupi men of central Australia to women painting. However, there was also a desire amongst many of the women to participate, and in the 1990s large numbers of them began to create paintings. In the western desert communities such as Kintore, Yuendumu, Balgo, and on the outstations, people were beginning to create art works expressly for exhibition and sale.

=== Career ===
Kitty Pultara took up painting in approximately 1986. Napperby Station was one of the first places where modern painting techniques were adopted by Indigenous artists: the movement commenced there in the mid 1980s, about the same time as at Yuendumu, where women began painting in 1983, and men in 1984.

Kitty is closely related to other major Indigenous artists of the region, notably cousin Clifford Possum Tjapaltjarri, whose works set auction price records for Indigenous art, and Tim Leura Tjapaltjarri, who was her brother and a leading figure in the establishment of the painting movement at Papunya in the 1970s.

Paintings can include representations of themes in nature, such as her work Kangaroo Dreaming, exhibited in the major Art Gallery of South Australia's 1996 exhibition, which represents the events of a kangaroo's daily life. Kitty's work is represented in the collections of the Art Gallery of South Australia, and the South Australian Museum.

== Collections ==
- Art Gallery of South Australia
- South Australian Museum
