= Mawukura =

Aboriginal Australian artist

Mawukura, also known as Jimmy Nerrimah (c.1924–2013), was an Australian Aboriginal artist.

== Life and career ==
Mawukura was a Walmadjari man. His country is around Wayampajarti, a permanent waterhole in the north-western area of the Great Sandy Desert in Western Australia.

His works have been sold to overseas collectors and are represented in the National Gallery of Australia and many other collections.

=== Buck–Milgin case ===
Nerrimah was in a relationship with Julie Buck – more than 40 years his junior – prior to her disappearance from Looma in 1993; her body was found the following year. Buck was also romantically involved with Richard Milgin, who disappeared around the same time. In 2016, a cold case homicide investigation by Western Australia Police named Nerrimah as one of three suspects in the two disappearances, along with his close friend John Watson and Watson's son Anthony. In 2023, Buck's best friend Lisa Skinner gave evidence before a coronial inquest that Nerrimah had beaten Buck on multiple occasions.

== Exhibitions ==
Solo shows

- 1999 Artplace, Perth
- 1994 Artplace, Perth
- 1994 Reflections of the Kimberley Gallery, Derby, WA
- 1993 Gallery Gabrielle Pizzi, Melbourne
- 2001 Artplace, Perth
- 2003 Cooee Gallery Sydney
- 2003 Artplace, Perth
- 2004 45 Downstairs Gallery, Melbourne
- 2005 Artplace, Perth
- 2005 Raft Artspace, Darwin

Group shows

- 1999 Selected to hang in 16th National Aboriginal & Torres Strait Islander Art Awards, Darwin, Northern Territory
- 1999 Aboriginal Kunst aus West Australien, Galerie Gaswerk, Germany
- 1999 Cooee Gallery Sydney with Peter Skipper
- 1994 ACAF-4, Fourth Australian Contemporary Art Fair, Melbourne
- 1994 Eight Western Australian Artists, The Blaxland Gallery, Sydney
- 1994 City of Gosnells Art Award, Art Prize
- 2001 Ngurrara Canvas National Gallery of Australia
- 2001 Framed Gallery, Darwin
- 2001 Cooee Gallery Sydney with Peter Skipper
- 2016 Billabong Dreams, Seattle Art Museum

== Collections ==
- Levy Kaplan Collection, Seattle, USA
- Thomas Vroom Collection, Amsterdam
- National Gallery of Australia
- Art Gallery of Western Australia
- Gallery Gabrielle Pizzi
- Ian & Sue Bernadt Collections
- Wesfarmers Ltd
