= Mount Liebig =

Mountain in Australia

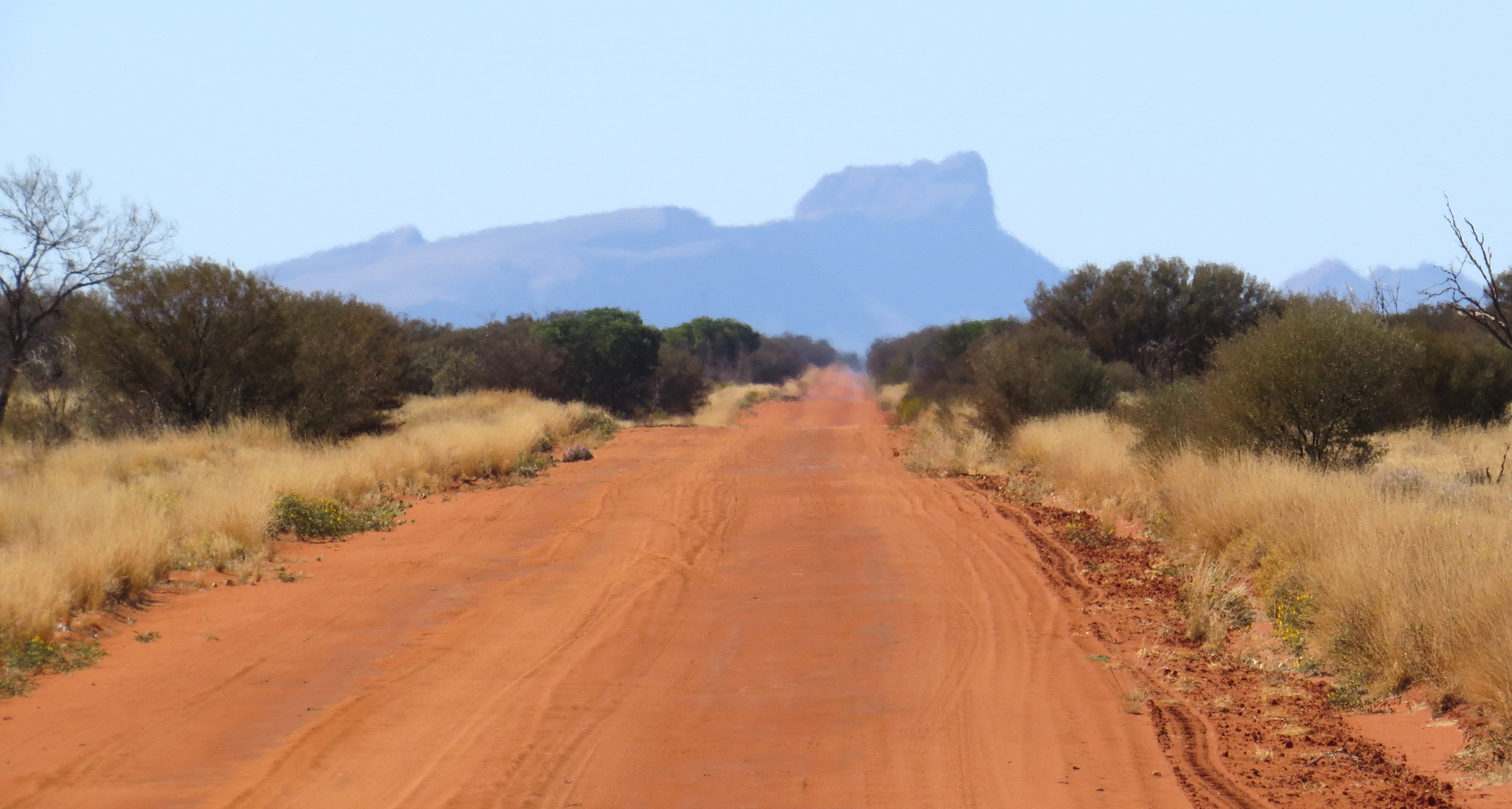
- Viewed from the Gary Junction Road looking east.

Highest point
- Elevation: 1,274 m (4,180 ft)AHD
- Coordinates: 23°17′16″S 131°21′51″E

Naming
- Etymology: Justus von Liebig

Geography
- Location within Northern Territory
- Location: Kunparrka. Northern Territory, Australia
- Parent range: MacDonnell Ranges

Mount Liebig is a mountain with an elevation of 1,274 metres (4,180 ft) AHD in the southern part of the Northern Territory of Australia. It is one of the highest peaks of the MacDonnell Ranges and was named by the explorer Ernest Giles after the German chemist Justus von Liebig. Nearby settlements include Mount Liebig and Haasts Bluff.

The killing of two Aboriginal men at Mount Liebig in 1932 according to traditional law led the missionary Ernest Kramer to demand the prosecution of the killers for murder, leading to debate on the applicability of white law to traditional violence. The men were tried but acquitted by a Darwin jury.

Notable Aboriginal Australians who have lived in the region of Mount Liebig include Indigenous artist Nora Andy Napaltjarri and Ngoia Pollard Napaltjarri.

== See also ==
- List of mountains of the Northern Territory
