= Tiwi Designs =

Art center in Australia

Tiwi Designs (Tiwi Designs Aboriginal Corporation) is an Aboriginal art centre located in Wurrumiyanga (formerly Nguiu) on Bathurst Island (one of the Tiwi Islands), north of Darwin, Australia. It holds a notable place in the history of the contemporary Aboriginal art movement as one of the longest running Aboriginal art centres, having started as a small screen-printing group in 1968-69. Only Ernabella Arts (1948) can establish a longer history.

== Designs ==
Tiwi Designs began with a series of woodblock prints produced in a small room under the Catholic Presbytery in Nguiu in 1968. These were produced by young artists Bede Tungatalum and Giovanni Tipungwuti with aid from Madeline Clear, the local art teacher. By 1969 these designs were being transferred to silkscreens, which remains a central medium for Tiwi artists and designers. The art centre was officially incorporated as an association in 1980.

== Exhibitions ==
Tiwi Designs’ first exhibition was held in 1971 at the Sebert Gallery in Sydney. Another Sydney exhibition, at the Hogarth Galleries in 1980, was greeted with coverage in Vogue magazine, the Sydney Morning Herald and the ABC evening news. Within one year of this exhibition, a number of documentaries were made about the Tiwi Islands, Tiwi Tours was started and the turnover of Tiwi Designs increased tenfold from around $30,000 to $300,000 per annum.

In 2015, the art centre produced screen printed fabrics, ochre paintings on bark and canvas, ironwood carvings, ceramics, bronze and glass sculptures and limited edition prints.
