= Napaljarri =

Indigenous skin name used in the Western Desert, Australia

Napaljarri or Napaltjarri is one of sixteen skin names used amongst Indigenous Australian people of Australia's Western Desert, including the Pintupi and Warlpiri. It is one of the eight female skin names. Skin names are often treated by Western cultures as equivalent to a surname; as a result the name is familiar to many as that of prominent Indigenous figures, such as artists Tjunkiya Napaltjarri, her sister Wintjiya Napaltjarri, and Linda Syddick Napaltjarri.

== Skin name ==
Skin names denote the subsections or subgroups in the kinship system of central Australian Indigenous people. These names define kinship relationships that influence preferred marriage partners and may be associated with particular totems. Although they may be used as terms of address, they are not surnames in the sense used by Europeans.

Individuals of the Napaljarri skin group (together with its male equivalent, Tjapaljarri) will be either owners (kurdu) or managers (kurdungurlu) of particular 'dreaming' sites. If they are the owners, then the managers will be from the Napurrurla / Tjupurrula skin name group, and vice versa.

Dreamings are associated with particular skin names and individuals. Jimmy Jungurrayi relates the story Patilirrikirli, a budgerigar dreaming associated with a location called Patilirri. This dreaming is specific to the Napaljarri / Tjapaljarri and Nungarrayi / Jungarrayi pairings of skin names. Dreamings associated with the Napaljarri women at Yuendumu include budgerigar, bush onion, witchetty grub and honey ant. These have been portrayed in paintings by artists such as Lucy Napaljarri Kennedy and Helen Nelson Napaljarri.

== Prominent members of the skin name group ==
There are numerous artists from the Napaljarri skin group. They include several who have been finalists in the National Aboriginal & Torres Strait Islander Art Awards: Daisy Jugadai Napaltjarri, Wintjiya Napaltjarri, Linda Syddick Napaltjarri and Ngoia Pollard Napaltjarri. One of these, Linda Syddick, has also been a finalist in the Blake Prize. Several Napaljarri women have works in the collection of Australia's national gallery, including Daisy Jugadai, Tjunkiya Napaltjarri, and Eileen Napaltjarri. Others have works in collections of the state galleries: Kitty Pultara Napaljarri's work is in the Art Gallery of South Australia; the Art Gallery of New South Wales holds work by Sheila Brown Napaljarri and Susie Bootja Bootja Napaltjarri.

Other artists of the skin group include Ada Andy Napaltjarri and her sister Nora Andy Napaltjarri.

Lucy Napaljarri Kennedy has been made a Member of the Order of Australia for her work in the Yuendumu community.
