= Balgo, Western Australia =

Community in Western Australia

Balgo
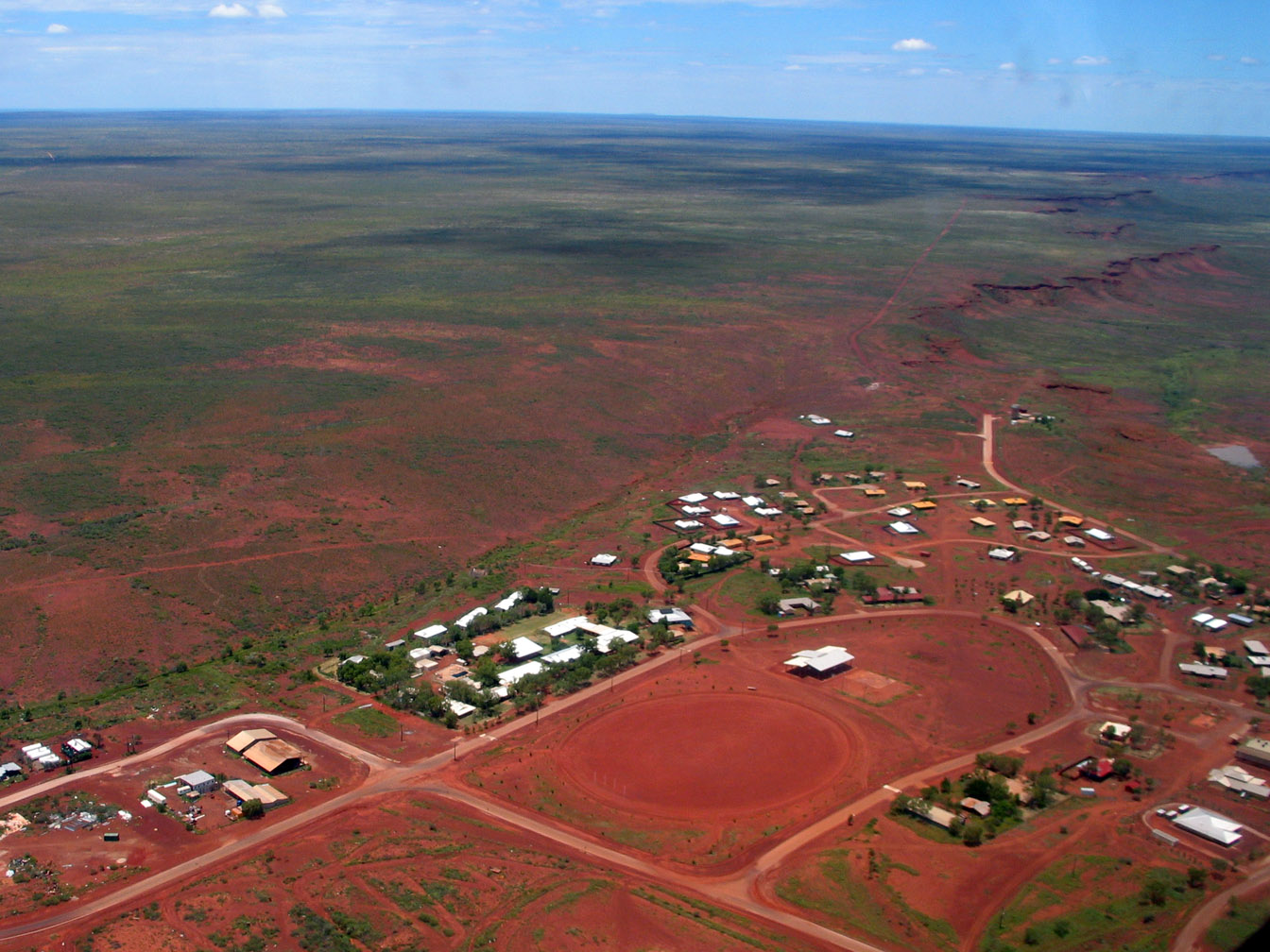
- Balgo viewed from the air

- Interactive map of Balgo
- Coordinates: 20.14°S 127.985°E
- Country: Australia
- State: Western Australia
- LGA: Shire of Halls Creek

Population
  - Total: 472 (UCL 2021); 430 (ILOC 2021)
- Time zone: UTC+8 (AWST)

Balgo, previously Balgo Hills and Balgo Mission, is a community in Western Australia that is linked with both the Great Sandy Desert and the Tanami Desert. The community is in the Shire of Halls Creek, off the Tanami Road, and was established by German missionaries in 1939. In the 2021 census Balgo's population numbered 430.

== History ==
The community was established following the arrival of German Pallottine Catholic missionaries in the region in 1939. Bishop Otto Raible and Ernest Ailred Worms, assisted by local MP Aubrey Coverley, secured an area of around 5 million acres south of Lake Gregory to be a "native mission". The Bishop settled on a site 60 km (37 mi) south of the lake, which he named Bishopdale.

Following the outbreak of World War II, the Australian government designated the missionaries "enemy aliens" and their radio transmitter and firearms were confiscated by police. After earlier sites proved to be unsatisfactory, the present site was chosen, in 1942.

The settlement was funded by the federal government as an outstation during the 1980s, along with Yagga Yagga outstation.

== Indigenous people and language ==
The name Balgo may have been derived from the Kukatja language word palkurr-palkurr, meaning rice grass, which grows nearby. The Kukatja dialect of the Western Desert Language is the first language for many people at Balgo, with the name deriving from the Kukatja (Gugadja) people. There is a Kukatja dictionary published by Luurnpa Catholic School, and at the school's Walkala Centre, audio books are created in both Kukatja and English.

Balgo is a multicultural community of Aboriginal peoples, with seven other language groups besides Kukatja represented: there are Ngardi, Djaru, Warlpiri, Walmajarri, Wangkajunga, Pintupi and Ngaatjatjarra residents.

In 2019, scientists from the University of Queensland were undertaking a research project on the Kukatja language, the local lingua franca which is fluently spoken "by residents of all ages and across at least seven tribal groups". Researchers were recording conversations and mapping the language, believing that Kukatja could provide clues to how languages are spread around the world. Dr Luis Miguel Rojas Berscia believed that the mission, as in other places such as the Amazon and West Africa could be the common thread, bringing different ethnic groups together in isolated spots. Work was being done on developing a dictionary and teacher's guide.

== Artists ==
During the 1980s, Balgo became famous for its artists' cooperative which was established when some of the original members of the Papunya Tula movement were allowed to leave Papunya. Some of the artists from Balgo include Susie Bootja Bootja Napaltjarri, Topsy Gibson Napaljarri, Eubena Nampitjin, Elizabeth Nyumi, Boxer Milner, Tjumpo (Bill) Tjapanangka, and "Helicopter" Tjungurrayi.

Warlayirti Artists Aboriginal Corporation was established in Balgo 1987, and represents more than 300 artists in Balgo, Kururrungku (Billiluna), and Mulan, who work in a variety of media and styles. The art centre, which is the oldest of its kind in Western Australia, celebrated its 35th anniversary with a special exhibition, Ngurra Kutjuwarra (On Country Together), in August 2022, after being isolated for most of the two and a half years of the COVID-19 pandemic in Australia. As of 2022 the manager is UK-born Poppy Leaver. John Carty of the South Australian Museum has had a relationship with Warlayirti Arts since around 2002.

In the early 1980s, a group of Kukatja and Warlpiri men in Balgo painted their stories on wooden boards, which somehow disappeared for years. In 2019, more than 20 of these works by were discovered by chance in a sea container in Wyndham, 50 km (31 mi) away. After the South Australian Museum (SAM) was advised of the find, the paintings, which were in very poor condition, were carefully restored by Artlab Australia in Adelaide. In October 2021 they were included in an exhibition at the museum called Balgo Beginnings, which also included new works by descendants of the original artists. Sales of a monograph, Balgo: Creating Country, by John Carty of the SAM, was launched along with the exhibition, with royalties being donated towards providing a dialysis service in Balgo.

== Governance ==
The community is managed by Wirrimanu Aboriginal Corporation, which was incorporated on 6 September 1984 under the Aboriginal Councils and Associations Act 1976.

Balgo falls within the determined Tjurabalan People (WCD2001/001) native title claim area.

The town plan, Balgo Layout Plan No. 3, was prepared in accordance with State Planning Policy 3.2 and was endorsed by the community and the Western Australian Planning Commission in 2005.

== Facilities ==
It has a petrol station, supermarket, Catholic parish, Luurnpa Catholic School (K–10), Kutjungka Trade Training Centre, clinic and police station. The Wirrimanu Community Store is a small independent business which is owned and operated by a local Indigenous corporation. Goods are trucked in once every two weeks via Adelaide and Alice Springs, owing to quarantine regulations. Being such a small outlet, there are no economies of scale for suppliers, leading to high prices for the locals (such as A$28 for a large pumpkin in 2023).

Balgo Hill Airport is located 1 nautical mile (1.9 km; 1.2 mi) south of Balgo.

In January 2020 the Australian Government announced an upgrade to the Tanami Road and its feeder roads. Conversion of the main road from gravel into a sealed road would improve safety and comfort for drivers on the 300-kilometre (190 mi) stretch from the Halls Creek junction, which is the only route to nearby regional centres and for the transport of essential supplies to the community. A new tourist road in Balgo would be used by local tour guides taking visitors to sacred lands.
