= Tjapaltjarri =

Tjapaltjarri is an Australian Aboriginal name and may be:

- Billy Stockman Tjapaltjarri (c.1927–2015), artist
- Cassidy Possum Tjapaltjarri (1923–2006), tribal elder and artist
- Clifford Possum Tjapaltjarri (1932–2002), painter
- Mick Namarari Tjapaltjarri (c.1926–1998), painter
- Thomas Tjapaltjarri (born c.1970), artist
- Walala Tjapaltjarri (born c.1964), artist
- Warlimpirrnga Tjapaltjarri (born late 1950s), artist

== See also ==
- Tjapaltjarri Brothers
