= Yalti Napangati =

Australian artist (born c. 1970)

- Born: c. 1970; Marruwa, Western Australia
- Other names: Yardi, Yalti Napaltjarri
- Occupation: Painter
- Years active: late 1980s – present
- Organization: Papunya Tula
- Style: Western Desert art
- Spouse: Warlimpirrnga Tjapaltjarri
- Children: 4
- Parents: Lanti, or "Joshua" (father); Nanu Nangala (mother)
- Relatives: Thomas Tjapangati; Yukultji Napangati; Walala Tjapangati; Topsy Napaltjarri; Takariya Napaltjarri

Yalti Napangati (born c. 1970) is an Australian Pintupi artist. She is a painter of the Western Desert style of art, and paints with the Papunya Tula artist cooperative. She is one of the Pintupi Nine, one of the last groups of Aboriginal Australians living a traditional way of life in Australia. Her ex-husband, Warlimpirrnga, is also a well-known artist and member of the Pintupi Nine.

== Life ==
Yalti was born in the Great Sandy Desert, sometime around 1970. She and her family, the Pintupi Nine, lived as nomads in the desert, travelling along the western side of Lake Mackay. Most other Pintupi families had moved into settlements during the 1950s, but Yalti's father kept the family away from these. Her parents were Lanti (or "Joshua") and Nanu. She has an older brother, Tamayinya, and a younger sister, Yukultji. She married Warlimpirrnga sometime during the early 1980s, possibly when she was as young as 12.

She and her family came out of the desert in 1984. She now lives at Kiwirrkurra, and has two sons and two daughters.

== Artistic career ==
Yalti finished her first paintings as part of the Papunya Tula artist cooperative in June 1996. She makes acrylic paintings of landscapes associated with Pintupi dreaming stories. Her paintings are of important places in her country, around Marruwa, Laurryi, Wirrulnga and Patjarr.
