= Thomas Tjapaltjarri =

Australian Aboriginal artist (born c. 1964)

- Born: Tamayinya Tjapangati c. 1964; Marruwa, Western Australia
- Died: 15th September 2024; Alice Springs
- Other names: Tamlik
- Occupation: Painter
- Years active: late 1980s – 2024
- Organization: Papunya Tula
- Style: Western Desert art
- Parents: Lanti, or "Joshua" (father); Nanu Nangala (mother)
- Relatives: Yalti Napangati; Yukultji Napangati; Warlimpirrnga Tjapaltjarri; Walala Tjapangati; Topsy Napaltjarri; Takariya Napaltjarri

Thomas Tjapaltjarri (born Tamayinya Tjapangati, also often known as Tamlik) was an Australian Aboriginal artist. He and his brothers Warlimpirrnga and Walala have become well known as the Tjapaltjarri Brothers. Tjapaltjarri and his family became known as the last group of Aboriginal Australians to come into contact with modern, European society. They came out of the desert in 1984.

== Early life ==
Tjapaltjarri was born in the desert of Western Australia sometime in the 1960s. He and his family lived a traditional nomadic way of life on the western side of Lake Mackay. They had never come into contact with European society. Most other Pintupi families had been settled in remote towns to the east and west of their traditional country during the 1950s. Tjapaltjarri's father, Lanti (or "Joshua"), had lived for a short time at the mission in Balgo, but he had run away after getting into trouble for stealing food. It was his decision to stay in the desert, and he kept his family far away from the towns.

Tjapaltjarri's mother was named Nanu. He also had two other mothers, Papunya and Watjunka, who were his father's secondary wives. He had two younger sisters, Yalti and Yukultji, a younger half-brother Walala, and four other "siblings" (cousins by blood relation). His father died sometime around 1980. The family finally came into contact with outsiders in October 1984, and were settled at Kiwirrkurra. The event was big news at the time, and the family became famously known as "the last nomads". Tjapaltjarri was diagnosed with epilepsy shortly after this.

Thomas passed away on the 15th of September 2024, in Alice Springs.

== Painting ==
Tjapaltjarri began painting in December 1987, a few years after settling at Kiwirrkurra. His cousin Warlimpirrnga had already made a name for himself as an artist and he encouraged Tjapaltjarri to paint too. Tjapaltjarri and Walala joined the Papunya Tula artists, and they and Warlimpirrnga eventually gained fame internationally as the Tjapaltjarri Brothers. Although he normally painted using Tjapaltjarri as a surname, Tjapaltjarri's skin name is Tjapangati.

His paintings depict stories from the Pintupi dreaming. They are mostly about places and events in the Tingari cycle (a cycle of myths about the ancestors of the Pintupi). His designs were inspired by those painted on the body during ceremonies. He used acrylic paints on canvas, sticking to earthy colours (black, white and ochres). He painted simple shapes with dotted lines, which is a style that his brothers also use.

He has had paintings shown in many exhibitions around Australia, and also in Switzerland, Germany, France and the United States. His larger paintings sell for at least A$6000 in Alice Springs and A$9500 in galleries in Melbourne and Sydney.

== Other websites ==
- Profile at the Red Desert Gallery
- Tjapaltjarri Brothers: Walimpirrnga, Walala & Thomas Tjapaltjarri, an exhibition at the Japingka Indigenous Fine Art Gallery
