= Linda Syddick Napaltjarri =

Australian Indigenous artist (b. c. 1937)

- Born: c.1937 Wilkinkarra (Lake Mackay), Western Australia
- Known for: Painting
- Awards: Finalist, National Aboriginal & Torres Strait Islander Art Award: 1995, 2006, 2008, 2009; Finalist, Blake Prize: 1990

Linda Yunkata Syddick Napaltjarri (born c. 1937) is a Pintupi- and Pitjantjatjara- speaking Indigenous artist from Australia's Western Desert region. Her father was killed when she was young; her mother later married Shorty Lungkarta Tjungarrayi, an artist whose work was a significant influence on Syddick's painting.

Syddick was one of many Western Desert women who took up painting in the early 1990s, as part of a broader contemporary Indigenous Australian art movement. She began painting some time prior to 1991, when her work was first exhibited in Alice Springs. Her work includes a distinctive fusion of Christian and Aboriginal traditional themes and motifs. She has been a finalist in the National Aboriginal & Torres Strait Islander Art Awards on at least four occasions, and in the Blake Prize (a religious art competition) at least three times. Her works are held by numerous galleries including the National Gallery of Australia, the Art Gallery of New South Wales and the Art Gallery of South Australia. Syddick was the subject of a portrait painted by Robert Hannaford, which was a 1992 finalist in Australia's premiere portrait competition, the Archibald Prize.

== Life ==
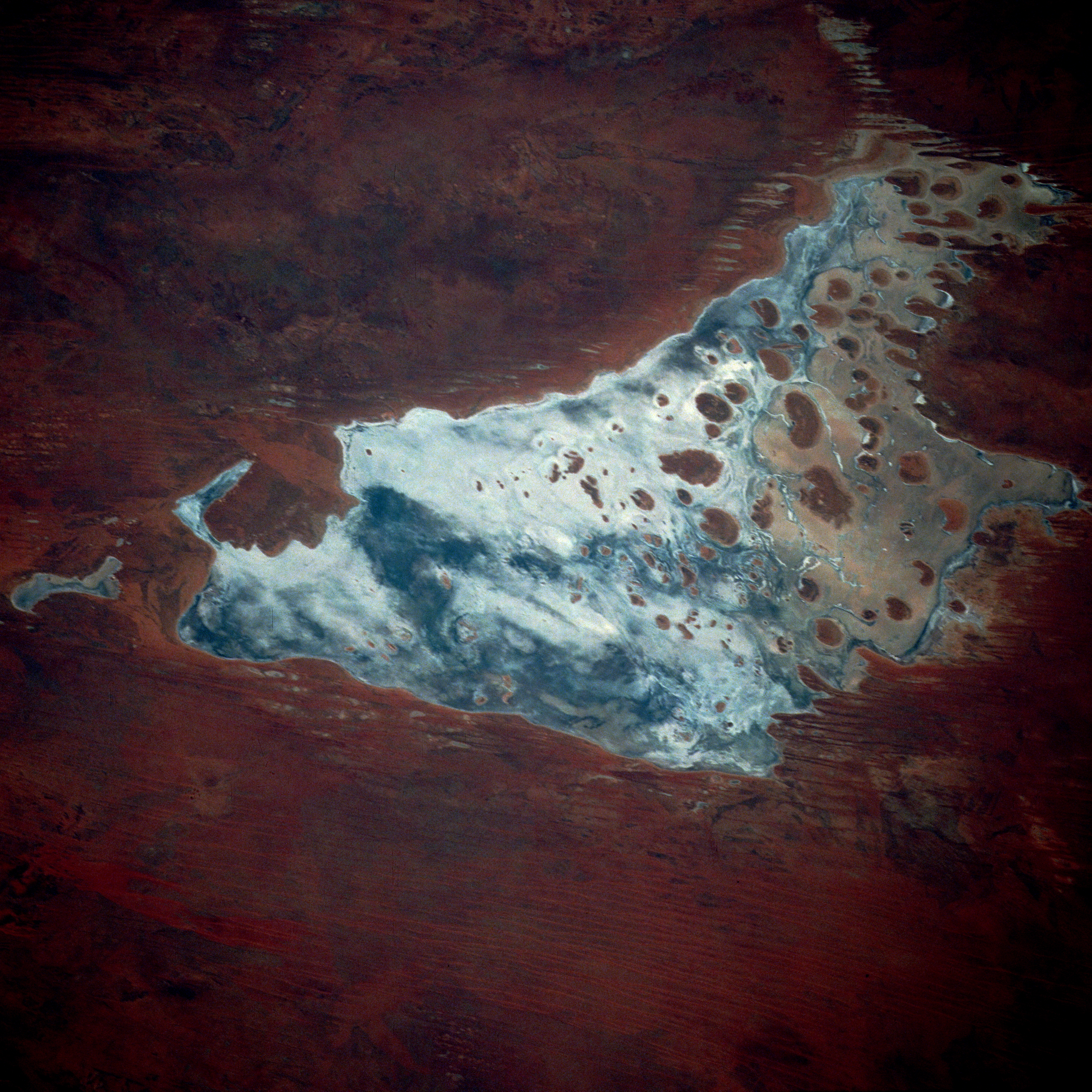
Lake Mackay, where Syddick was born.

Sources differ on the year of Syddick's birth. The Art Gallery of South Australia suggests 1941; Birnberg and Kreczmanski's biographical survey suggests circa 1937. The ambiguity around the year of birth is in part because Indigenous Australians operate using a different conception of time, often estimating dates through comparisons with the occurrence of other events. She was born near Western Australia's Wilkinkarra, or Lake Mackay, northeast of Kiwirrkurra Community, Western Australia and northwest of Kintore, Northern Territory.

'Napaljarri' (in Warlpiri) or 'Napaltjarri' (in Western Desert dialects) is a skin name, one of sixteen used to denote the subsections or subgroups in the kinship system of central Australian Indigenous people. These names define kinship relationships that influence preferred marriage partners and may be associated with particular totems. Although they may be used as terms of address, they are not surnames in the sense used by Europeans. Thus 'Linda Syddick' is the element of the artist's name that is specifically hers. Syddick has also been referred to as Tjungkaya Napaltjarri, however she is not the artist Tjunkiya Napaltjarri, who lived at Papunya, Northern Territory.

Syddick's parents were Wanala or Napulu Nangala and Rintja Tjungurrayi; however Rintja (or Riintja) was killed in a revenge attack when Syddick was still very small, and in 1943 her mother moved to Kintore. Syddick's stepfather Shorty Lungkarta Tjungarrayi was a significant influence on her early painting. Short Lungkata was also the father of artist Wintjiya Morgan Napaltjarri (known as Wintjiya No. 2 and no relation to yet another artist, Wintjiya Napaltjarri). Linda married Musty Siddick, had two children Ruby and Irene, and in the 1970s they were living in a Northern Territory Pintupi community called Yayayi. After Musty's death she remarried.

Syddick has also achieved recognitition as a painter's model: she was the subject of Robert Hannaford's painting that was a finalist in the 2002 Archibald Prize, Australia's premier portrait prize.

== Art ==
=== Background ===
Contemporary Indigenous art of the western desert began when Indigenous men at Papunya began painting in 1971, assisted by teacher Geoffrey Bardon. This initiative, which used acrylic paints to create designs representing body painting and ground sculptures, rapidly spread across Indigenous communities of central Australia, particularly following the commencement of a government-sanctioned art program in central Australia in 1983. By the 1980s and 1990s, such work was being exhibited internationally. The first artists, including all of the founders of the Papunya Tula artists' company, had been men, and there was resistance amongst the Pintupi men of central Australia towards women painting. However, there was also a desire amongst many of the women to participate, and in the 1990s a large number of them began to create paintings. In the western desert communities such as Kintore, Yuendumu, Balgo, and on the outstations, people were beginning to create art works expressly for exhibition and sale.

=== Career ===
Syddick was painting by 1991, when her works were hung in a private gallery—Gallery Gondwana—in Alice Springs. Her works, such as A nest of crosses, gladly borne painted for an exhibition titled Mary Mackillop: a tribute, combine traditional Indigenous painting techniques and motifs with Christian imagery and themes. Syddick had two paintings included in an exhibition, From Appreciation to Appropriation, at the Flinders University Art Museum City Gallery in 2000. One—Eucharist—again looked at Christian influences in Indigenous culture; the other dealt with Hollywood influences, and was titled ET: the bicycle ride. Syddick's interest in Christian iconography is reflected in the inclusion of her work The Eucharist in another Flinders University Art Museum exhibition, Holy, Holy, Holy in 2004, which examined the advent of Christianity in Australia. Other works represent her traditional country, such as her painting Tingari Men at Wilkingkarra (Lake Mackay), which was a finalist at the 2009 National Aboriginal & Torres Strait Islander Art Awards. Artists of the Western Desert region, such as Syddick, frequently portray figures from the Tingari cycle of 'songlines', particularly the Tingari Men. These are ancestral elders who − in the Dreaming − travelled over vast areas, performing rituals and creating the country.

In 1990, Syddick went to Sydney to see her work Ngkarte Dreaming hung in the Blake Prize exhibition – one of three occasions prior to 1994 on which she was a Blake finalist. The Adelaide Biennial of Australian Art included one of her paintings in 1998. She has been represented on several occasions in the National Aboriginal & Torres Strait Islander Art Awards, in 1995, 2006 (with her painting The Witch Doctor and the Windmill), 2008 (with Big rain at Walukurritje), and 2009, with Tingari Men at Wilkingkarra (Lake Mackay). Syddick's works are held in several major public collections, including the National Gallery of Australia, the Art Gallery of New South Wales and the Art Gallery of South Australia.

== Collections ==
- Art Gallery of New South Wales
- Art Gallery of South Australia
- Artbank
- Auckland City Art Gallery
- Museum and Art Gallery of the Northern Territory
- National Gallery of Australia
- Kluge-Ruhe Aboriginal Art Collection of the University of Virginia

== Awards ==
- 2009 – finalist, 26th National Aboriginal & Torres Strait Islander Art Award
- 2008 – finalist, 25th National Aboriginal & Torres Strait Islander Art Award
- 2006 – finalist, 23rd National Aboriginal & Torres Strait Islander Art Award
- 1995 – finalist, 12th National Aboriginal & Torres Strait Islander Art Award
