= Pintupi Nine =

Group of Aboriginal Australian traditional hunter-gatherers

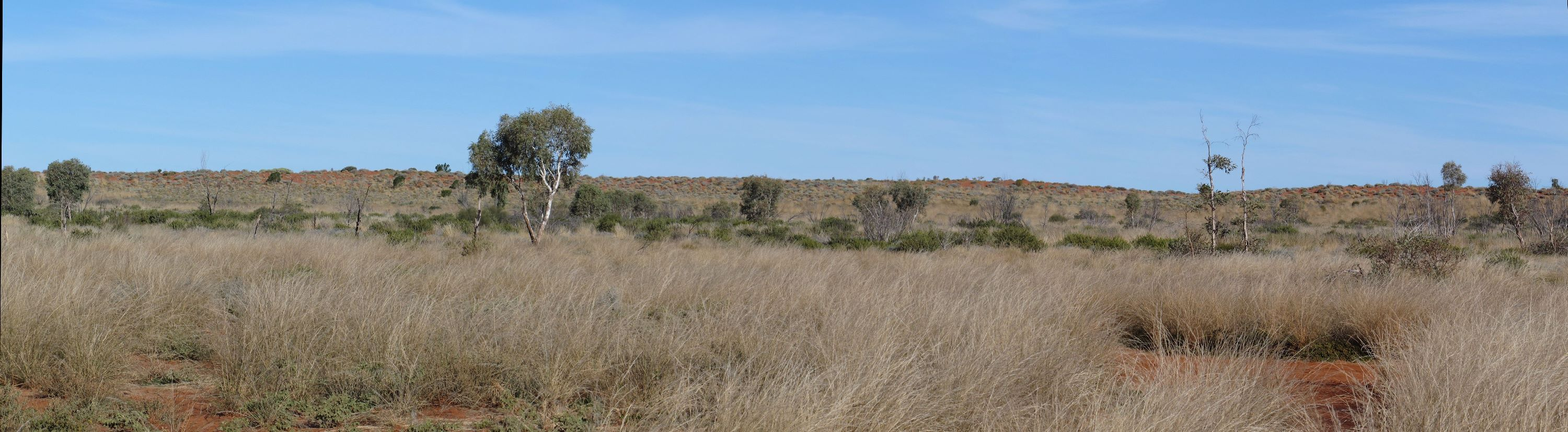
Gibson Desert

The Pintupi Nine are a group of nine Pintupi people who remained unaware of European colonisation of Australia and lived a traditional desert-dwelling life in Australia's Gibson Desert until 1984, when they made contact with their relatives near Kiwirrkurra. They are sometimes also referred to as "the lost tribe".

The group were hailed as "the last nomads" in the international press when they left their nomadic life in October 1984, though this title would later be taken by the Richters family, who were discovered in 1986 and are to this day the last Aboriginal people known to have lived traditionally as hunter-gatherers.

== History ==
The group roamed between waterholes near Lake Mackay, near the Western Australia-Northern Territory border, wearing hairstring belts and armed with two-metre-long (6 1/2 ft) wooden spears and spear throwers, and intricately carved boomerangs. Their diet was dominated by goanna and rabbit as well as bush food native plants. The group was a family, consisting of two co-wives (Nanyanu and Papalanyanu) and seven children. There were four boys (Warlimpirrnga, Walala, Tamlik, and Piyiti) and three girls (Yalti, Yikultji and Takariya). The children were all in their teens, although their exact ages were not known; the mothers were in their late 30s.

On the death of the father – husband of the two wives – the group travelled south to where they thought their relatives might be, as they had seen "smokes" in that direction. They encountered two campers from Kiwirrkura but due to a misunderstanding involving a shotgun they fled back north while the campers returned to the community and alerted others who then travelled back with them to find the group. The community members quickly realised that the group were relatives who had been left behind in the desert twenty years earlier, when many had travelled into the missions nearer Alice Springs. The community members travelled by vehicle to where the group were last seen and then tracked them for some time before finding them. After making contact and establishing their relationships, the Pintupi nine were invited to come and live at Kiwirrkura, where most of them still reside.

The Pintupi-speaking trackers told them there was plenty of food, and water that came out of pipes; Yalti has said that this concept astounded them. Medical examination revealed that the Tjapaltjarri clan (as they are also known) were "in beautiful condition. Not an ounce of fat, well proportioned, strong, fit, healthy". At Kiwirrkura, near Kintore, they met with other members of their extended family.

In 1986, Piyiti returned to the desert. Warlimpirrnga, Walala and Tamlik (now known as "Thomas") have gained international recognition in the art world as the Tjapaltjarri Brothers. The three sisters, Yalti, Yikultji and Takariya, are also well-known Aboriginal artists whose works can be seen on exhibition and purchased from a number of art dealers. One of the mothers has died; the other has settled with the three sisters in Kiwirrkurra.

Although at the time of their discovery the group was hailed as "the last nomads", two years later in 1986, another group of previously uncontacted Aboriginal Australians still living a hunter-gatherer existence, the seven-person Richter family, were located in the Great Victoria Desert in south-western Australia.

== See also ==
- Bindibu expedition
- Ishi
- Warri and Yatungka
- Richters (Australian Aboriginal family)
