= Walala =

Walala may refer to:

== People ==
- Felipe Seymour (born 1987), Chilean footballer nicknamed "Walala"
- Walala Tjapaltjarri (early 1970s–2026), Australian Aboriginal artist
- Camille Walala, pseudonym of French artist Camille Vic-Dupont (born 1975)

== Places ==
- Walala, Central Province, Sri Lanka
- Walalawela, Sri Lanka

== See also ==
- Walala Megodagammedda, Sri Lanka
