= Timmy Payungka Tjapangati =

Aboriginal Australian artist (died 2000)

- Born: circa 1940; Lake Mackay, Western Australia, Australia
- Died: 7 May 2000 (aged 59–60); Alice Springs, Northern Territory, Australia
- Other names: Tim Tjapangarti, Payungu, Pyungu, Japangardi, Puyungku, Timmy
- Known for: Painting, contemporary Indigenous Australian art

Timmy Payungka (c.1942 – 7 May 2000) was an Aboriginal Australian artist, a Pintupi man who worked at the Papunya Tula school of painting. He was born at Parayirpilynga, near Wilkinkarra (Lake Mackay) in the Pilbara region of Western Australia.

He met his wife at Warburton. His family was met by a welfare patrol at Yarrana, west of Kintore, Northern Territory, and brought in to Papunya early in the 1960s. He was one of the original painting men with Geoffrey Bardon. He moved to Kintore in 1981 and was active in later establishing the settlement at Kiwirrkura, closer to his country.

Payungka was an important law man, knowledgeable about many stories and rituals. According to Daphne Williams of Papunya Tula, a trip west from Alice Springs to Kintore with Timmy could take two or three times as long as a trip without him, so great was his enthusiasm for stopping along the way to tell his companions the stories of the land they passed through. He taught his daughter, Lorna Napanangka, to paint.

A solo exhibition of his work was displayed at Aboriginal and South Pacific Gallery in Sydney.

His work Kangaroo and Shield People Dreaming at Lake MacKay (1980) depicts part of a sacred men's story of his people.

Payungka also played an integral role in the "carpets case", a successful 1994 lawsuit dealing with the application of copyright in Australia and Indigenous intellectual property to Indigenous Australian arts, along with Banduk Marika, George Milpurrurru and five others. A Perth company had used Kangaroo and Shield People Dreaming for copying onto rugs to be made in Vietnam.

He also advocated for the resettlement of the Pintupi homelands.

In his later years, Timmy lived in Alice Springs and was assisted in his painting by his wife, Emily. He died on 7 May 2000.

== See also ==
- Indigenous Australian art
