= Yukultji Napangati =

Aboriginal Australian artist

- Born: early 1970s Marruwa, Western Australia
- Other name: Yikultji
- Occupation: Painter
- Years active: early 1990s – present
- Organization: Papunya Tula
- Style: Western Desert art
- Spouse: Charlie Ward Tjakamarra
- Children: Derek Ward Lisa Ward Napurrula; Cynthia Ward Napurrula
- Parents: Lanti, or "Joshua" (father); Nanu Nangala (mother)
- Relatives: Thomas Tjapangati; Yalti Napangati; Warlimpirrnga Tjapaltjarri; Walala Tjapangati; Topsy Napaltjarri; Takariya Napaltjarri
- Awards: Wynne Prize (2018)

Yukultji Napangati is an Aboriginal Australian artist. She is a painter of the Papunya Tula group of artists. She is part of a generation of female painters who followed in the footsteps of the original male Papunya Tula artists.

== Biography ==
Yukultji Napangati was born north of Kiwirrkurra near Lake Mackay in the Gibson Desert of Western Australia. Living as a nomad, she spent the early years of her life learning about her country, such as the geography, topography, vegetation, fauna, weather, and seasons. Once her family was met with colonialism, she spent the rest of her life in contact with the world and modernity, which eventually led her to painting. Today, Yukultji is an Aboriginal artist commanding a global stage.

== Family ==
Yukultji is the daughter of Nanu Nangala and Lanti Yukulti and has many siblings making up their nomadic tribe. While many Pintupi people were forced off their land through colonization, Yukultji's family managed to live out of reach from authorities. They were known as the “lost tribe” and the Pintupi Nine. They lived in the bush by old ways of life, hunting, gathering and existing in complete isolation from the outside world. She grew up without knowing about places like Kiwirrkurra, or her relatives living there. She had never met anyone from outside their tribe. Her family lived a completely traditional nomadic way of life on a diet of bush plants, kangaroo and goanna. Her father had lived for a short time at the mission in Balgo, but he had run away after getting into trouble for stealing food. It was his decision to stay in the desert, and kept his family far away from the towns. Napangati's father died sometime around 1980. The family finally came into contact with outsiders in October 1984, and were settled at Kiwirrkurra. Emerging from the bush, they became known as the last of the desert nomads. The event was big news at the time, and the family became famously known as "the last nomads". Napangati was 14 years old and the youngest of the group.

After her family had emerged, they were introduced to a completely new lifestyle. Napangati experienced major culture shock when first coming out of the desert. She often found new things difficult to understand. In an interview once, she remembers, "I hopped into a car and crouched down, and I saw the trees move. I was frightened. I was scared. I jumped right off because the trees were racing around the place." It was during this time that she first saw white people, started wearing clothing and began eating European food.

Yukultji married Charlie Ward Tjakamarra and together they had a daughter and a son. The passing of Charlie inspired her to become more involved with art.

== Papunya Tula Artists ==
Napangati began painting in the 1990s at Papunya Tula Arts Center. The Artists Center was founded in November 1972. The community became well known as groups of senior men began painting on anything and everything they could find, triggering the formation of a community painting organization. John Kean, the art advisor from 1977 to 1979 said, "Papunya Tula painting was generated by the impact of indigenous culture with European aspirations and aesthetics. It is the shiniest of the shards from this collision of cultures." The art center represents the culture, history and tradition of their community through creativity. Communal gatherings and family connectivity are central aspects of the Papunya Tula Artists.

At the art center, in 1996, she began painting with a group of women including her mothers and sisters. These women were joining a previously male-dominated community of painters. Yukultji had watched her brothers and husband paint and decided to try it for herself. The women sat in circles and socialized as they painted, learning from one another and the men. They shared ancestral stories while painting on canvas. For the first time, the women had independence to reshape the Western Desert art and expand on the Tjukurrpa knowledge, which became their creative inspirations.

== Art ==
Napangati's style is frequently associated with minimal colors that produce a shimmering effect and her primary subject is "country". Her painting are symbolic of the harsh desert conditions, the dots and waves shimmer like the star and the sand. Her work often references Yunarla, a location off of the west of Kiwirrkurra where she spent time camping and collecting roots with other women. The lines, colors and movement in her paintings represent the features of these specific places. The art is a reflection of landscapes and their importance. In a reflection on the work of Napangati, Cara Pinchbeck said, "Yukultji's paintings do not seek to explain the landscape but provide a sense of its immensity and importance." Napangati also paints the stories and songs from her and her mother's Dreaming. These stories are about her traditional country, around Marruwa, Ngaminya and Marrapinti.

By the early 2000s Yukultji had gained experience, developed a refined style and expanded her confidence within the field. Stylistically, she used lines and colors to create patchwork effects, enveloping the entirety of the canvas. Her designs rely on concentric circles to portray interconnectedness, within the art and within her country.

== Global presence ==
Yukultji's paintings are shown in several public collections in Australia, but her work has also been shown in over 80 exhibitions in Australia and overseas.

In 2009, Napangati traveled to New York for a solo exhibition at Salon 94 in the Bowery which promoted monumental success for her career.

She was a finalist in the National Aboriginal and Torres Strait Islander Art Awards (NATSIAA awards), in 2006, 2009, 2010 and 2011.

In 2012, Napangati won the Alice Prize, an award for Australian artists in Alice Springs.

In 2018, she won the Wynne Prize for landscape painting.

In 2018, Napangati's work was included in the exhibition Marking the Infinite: Contemporary Women Artists from Aboriginal Australia at The Phillips Collection.

In 2019, US rapper Jay-Z bought one of Napangati's artworks, which was featured on an Instagram post by his wife Beyoncé in July 2021, attracting 3.5 million likes within a week.

== Collections ==
- Art Gallery of New South Wales
- Griffith University Art Museum
- Harvard Art Museums, Cambridge
- Hood Museum of Art, Dartmouth College,
- Kluge-Ruhe Aboriginal Art Collection of the University of Virginia
- Milwaukee Art Museum
- National Gallery of Australia
- National Gallery of Victoria
- Queensland Art Gallery | Gallery of Modern Art
- Seattle Art Museum
- Toledo Museum of Art
