= Long Jack Phillipus Tjakamarra =

Australian painter (c.1932 – 2020)

Long Jack Phillipus Tjakamarra (c. 1932 – 2020), occasionally referred to as Kumantjayi Long Tjakamarra, was a Ngalia/Warlpiri man (a Western desert man) and a founding member of the Papunya Tula art cooperative. His contribution to the Honey Ant Dreaming mural would help define and catalyze the art style of the Western Desert Art Movement.

The impact of Long Jack and the Papunya Tula on the Western Desert Art Movement is best expressed through Long Jack's statement in 2010, "We started it, like a bushfire, this painting business, and it went every way: north, east, south, west, Papunya in the middle."

== Biography ==
Long Jack Phillipus Tjakamarra was born in 1932 in an area north-east of Kintore (Pintupi: Walungurru), referred to as Kalipinya, situated in the Northern Territory of Australia. Long Jack and his family would later move to Haasts Bluff. He stayed in Haasts Bluff throughout his early adulthood where he worked as a timber cutter and stockman and got married. Tjakamarra would move again in 1962 to Papunya where he worked as a groundsman and councillor at a nearby school. Tjakamarra later took on the name of "Long Jack" due to his above average height.

Long Jack would not start his artistic journey until the arrival of school teacher Geoffery Bardon in 1971. Bardon's encouragement of the Papunya school children to create art would inspire the elders, including Long Jack, to get involved in painting. Long Jack, alongside Bill Stockman Tjapaltjarri, would first paint two murals "Widow's Dreaming" and "Wallaby Dreaming" on the school walls before working on the quintessential Honey Ant Dreaming mural. The Honey Ant Dreaming mural was inspired by the patterns that Bardon and his interpreter Obed Raggett had painted upon a classroom floor. Upon seeing these patterns, Long Jack and the other yardmen would come to Bardon and Raggett seeking to take part in the mural. Long Jack would help work on the Honey Ant Dreaming mural through its entirety from June to August 1971.

Long Jack would often spend his time in a school room working on other projects whilst working on the Honey Ant Dreaming mural. In July 1971, he and other yardmen would work on painting a puppet theater for the children of Papunya. In early 1972, a painting room was created which became the main area in which Long Jack and the other painting men would create their art. Later into 1972, Long Jack would join the Papunya Tula cooperative created by Geoffery Bardon alongside Papunya painters Tim Leura Tjapaltjarri and Bill Stockman Tjapaltjarri. Long Jack would be appointed as Chair of the Papunya Tula cooperative in 1975 and again in the 1990s.

Ten years after Geoffrey Bardon's departure of the Papunya school in 1973, Long Jack would go on to win Northern Territory Golden Jubilee Art Award in 1983. In 1984, he would be ordained as a Lutheran pastor and win the Alice Springs Caltex Art Award.

Long Jack, the last of the founding members of the Papunya Tula, died in an Alice Springs hospital in August 2020.

== Education ==
Long Jack has no formal education. Instead, he grew up working as a timber contractor and wood cutter, among other jobs, and developed reputable bushcraft skills. His artistic skills stem from his upbringing as an Aboriginal Australian with his more formal painting development coming from Geoffrey Bardon's teachings.

== Artworks ==
=== Water Dreaming with Water Man – 1971 ===
Painted using synthetic polymer powder paint on 44 x 22.5 cm composition wood. The lateral painting is composed of various curved, red-orange lines which converge onto a central line that runs down the center of the painting. The base color of the painting is some form of black or dark brown. Three open circles, of similar width and color as the lines, are present and intercept the central line (one at the start, one in the center, and one at the bottom of the line). Six more open circles appear in between the curved the lines with three situated on either side of the central line at the same height as those along the center line. At the bottom of the painting lies a "U" shape, following the same construction as the other lines, which opens upwards toward the center line. Littered across the canvas, in-between all of the lines, are white dots of varying shapes and sizes.

The painting is a depiction of a "Water Man" who is calling for the rainfall. The lines which traverse the painting are symbols of running water which link the waterholes represented by the open circles. The dots represent the falling rain. The painting shares similar elements to that of other Water Dreaming paintings in that the ceremonial Water Man sings to beckon the rain which then flows into the waterholes from which the Papunya people get their water. The simplistic style of this painting is invocative of early Papunya sand drawings and body painting.

=== Women's Dreaming – 1973 ===
Painted using poster paint with PVA Bondcrete glue on a roughly 70 x 40 cm hardboard. The multi-faceted artwork is painted using warm, earth tones. A closely packed, wavy lines run down the center of the vertical painting and end a group of concentric circles. Semicircle lines lie on either side of the central lines with their open side facing the center. Towards the lateral edges of the painting lie more semicircles which surround long, decorated rods. In-between the two sets of semicircles on the right side of the painting are human and wallaby tracks. At the bottom of the painting are smaller concentric circles surrounded by more semicircles and another large, intricate rod. Several dots of paint in various colors cover the painting.

The painting depicts a large number of women, represented by semicircles, sitting around ceremonial sticks, represented by the long rods. The central wavy lines depict flowing water and the concentric circles in which they converge represent a waterhole. The tracks are that of the Wallaby Man and wallabies. The concentric circles and semicircles at the bottom represent women sitting around fires. At the very bottom of the page lies a ceremonial object. The painting serves as a collection of various ceremonial iconography. The painting shows a crossover between the bush tucker stories of Wallaby Men in search of wallaby and the sitting women performing a water ceremony.

=== Children's Dreaming – 1973 ===
Painted using poster paint with PVA glue on a roughly 58 x 40 cm hardboard. The painting is dominated by a large human figure whose limbs are outstretched towards the corners of the painting. The figure is painted in black with dots and stripes of color comprising its shirt and face. At the tip of the figure's extremities lie concentric circles. A myriad of grouped lines are scattered about the painting. More concentric circles are placed around the figure with groups of lines connecting the circles. Several ovular shapes are strewn about the painting and contain intricate designs. The empty spaces of the painting are filled with lines, dashes, and dots of paint.

The painting is of the Teacher Ceremonial Man performing a performance. The concentric circles and lines which connect them represent a dreaming map. The Teacher Ceremonial Man is surrounded by bullroarers which aid in his performance which tells of his dreaming journey across the dreaming map. The simplified figure and message of the painting lends to its function as a children's story element.

== Legacy ==
Long Jack's participation in the Papunya Tula cooperative contributed to the broader promotion of Indigenous Australian art. Through the use of the acrylic painting style, his work helped disseminate the culture and traditions of the Western Desert art movement.

== Exhibitions ==
- Important Australian Paintings (28 February 2023 – 25 March 2023) at Philip Bacon Galleries
- Tjungunutja: From Having Come Together (1 July 2017 – 18 February 2018) at Museum and Art Gallery of the Northern Territory
  - and (16 March 2019 – 2 June 2019) at Araluen Arts Centre
- Landmarks and Law Grounds: Men of the Desert (12 April 2013 – 22 May 2013) at Japingka Aboriginal Art Gallery
- Papunya Tula : Genesis and Genius (18 August 2000 – 12 November 2000) at Art Gallery of New South Wales

== Collections ==
- Museum and Art Gallery of the Northern Territory (21 works, including Water and lightning story at Pulinganu 1971 and Honey Ant story 1971)
- Te Papa Tongarewa (2 works, Fire dreaming at Parikulaman and Water dreaming at Kalipinpa)
- National Museum of Australia (2 works, Wilkinkarra men's camp 1975 and Making spears 1975)
- National Gallery of Australia (4 works including Snake story 1973 and Water course)
- National Gallery of Victoria (3 works including Emu dreaming and Possum man and possum woman travelling)
- Art Gallery of South Australia (2 works Water dreaming 1987 and Widow's dreaming 1971)
- Art Gallery of Western Australia (6 works including The water ancestors 1974 and The snake and the bushfire 1974)
- Japingka Aboriginal Art Gallery (5 works including Possum dreaming and Snake dreaming)
- Araluen Arts Centre (1 work, Children's dreaming)
- Art Gallery of New South Wales (1 work, Travels of the snake Larru Larru)

== Awards ==
- Northern Territory Golden Jubilee Art Award (1983)
- Alice Springs Caltex Art Award (1984)
