= Warlimpirrnga Tjapaltjarri =

Aboriginal Australian artist

- Born: late 1950s hillside east of modern-day Kiwirrkurra, Western Australia
- Occupation: Painter
- Years active: 1987 – present
- Organization: Papunya Tula
- Style: Western Desert art
- Spouse: Yalti Napangati
- Children: 4
- Parents: Waku Tjungurrayi (father); Papalya Nangala (mother)
- Relatives: Topsy Napaltjarri; Takariya Napaltjarri; Piyiti Tjapaltjarri; Thomas Tjapangati; Yukultji Napangati; Walala Tjapangati

Warlimpirrnga Tjapaltjarri is an Australian Indigenous artist and a leading figure in the realm of contemporary Aboriginal art. Born in the early 1950s in the Gibson Desert in WA, Warlimpirrnga is a member of the Pintupi people, amongst the last to interact with Western civilisation. In fact, his life and art are instrumental in ancient traditions concerning his people, especially the Dreaming stories, which are known as Tjukurrpa among his community.

== Early life ==
Tjapaltjarri was born in the late 1950s, near Lake Mackay, east of where Kiwirrkurra is today. His family were Pintupi hunter-gatherers who lived a traditional nomadic way of life on the western side of the lake, and had never come into contact with Euro-Australian society. Tjapaltjarri's father died when he was a young boy, and his mother remarried shortly after. Tjapaltjarri himself married his cousin Yalti sometime around 1980. He served as the family's main provider of food, hunting with spears, mirru (spear-throwers) and boomerangs.

In 1984, when Tjapaltjarri was about 25, he finally came into contact with people from outside his family. Upon seeing a white man for the first time, Tjapaltjarri remembers, "I couldn't believe it. I thought he was a devil, a bad spirit. He was the colour of clouds at sunrise." A few days later, he and his family were settled at Kiwirrkurra. News of this group living nomadically so far into the modern world made headlines internationally.

== Painting and style ==
Tjapaltjarri started painting in 1987, working with Papunya Tula. Initially practicing under the tutelage of other artists at the company, he finished his first painting for them in April 1987. His first public exhibition was in Melbourne, the following year. It showed eleven of his paintings, all of which were bought for the National Gallery of Victoria. He has since become one of central Australia's most well-known artists.

Tjapaltjarri paints abstract images of sacred stories and songs from his family's Dreaming. The stories focus around the Tingari, the ancestors of the Pintupi, spirit beings who are believed to have created all living things. His stories are about his country and sacred sites such as Marruwa and Kanapilya.

Tjapaltjarri's work often includes elaborate topographical patterns that depict sacred landscapes including Lake Mackay and Marawa where his Pintupi ancestors traveled. He does so using a series of thousands of delicate concentric lines that appear to overlap each other and eventually converge to create a sense of movement and depth. Tjapaltjarri's primary work uses colours typical of the natural ochres found in his homeland; white, dark red, grey, and occasionally black.

== Global influence ==
Tjapaltjarri's work is held in several major public collections across Australia, such as in the National Gallery in Canberra, the Art Gallery of New South Wales, and the National Gallery of Victoria. He also has work in galleries overseas, such as the Quai Branly Museum in Paris, and the Kluge-Ruhe Aboriginal Art Collection at the University of Virginia. In 2012, his work was shown as part of the documenta exhibition in Kassel, Germany. As of 2008, the most one of his paintings had sold for was A$85,000.

Tjapaltjarri gained recognition in the United States in September 2015 when he appeared in an article titled "An Aboriginal Artist's Dizzying New York Moment" on the front page of the New York Times Saturday Arts Page. He is shown at the top of the article with a colour photo in front of his abstract-looking painting displayed in the Bowery. Glowing appraisal by critic Randall Kennedy garnered attention.

In September 2016, one of his paintings sold for £167,000 at Sotheby's in London. October 2016, he had his first solo exhibition in the United States, at the Salon 94 gallery in New York City.

In March 2019, the Netflix series After Life, made by Ricky Gervais, featured a copy of one of Tjapaltjarri's paintings which had been made by an artist commissioned to do so for a props company in 1999. Gervais' company agreed to pay compensation for using the copy of the work, a 1987 work entitled Tingarri Dreaming, as well as a fee for use of the work in season two of the series.

The music of Australian composer Newton Armstrong's 2020 album "The Way to Go Out" was influenced by Tjapaltjarri's paintings. "Armstrong's project recreates this "dense and mesmerising" quality in sound, and finds an ingenious correspondence for Tjapaltjarri's great sense of focus and local detail."
