= Yumu people =

Indigenous Australian people

The Yumu (also written Jumu) were an Indigenous Australian people of the Northern Territory.

== Language ==
The Yumu language was called Ŋatatara. This was often mistaken for their ethnonym and transcribed Ngatatara leading to confusion between the Yumu and the Ngaatjatjarra of Western Australia.

== Country ==
According to Norman Tindale, the Yumu ranged over some 4,900 square miles (13,000 km^{2}) of tribal land, in the Western MacDonnell Ranges, running east of Mount Russell to the vicinity of Mount Zeil. Their northern reaches were apparently just south of central Mount Wedge and Lake Bennett. He puts their southern limits around Mount Solitary and Mount Udor. They were also present at Haast Bluff (Ulambaura), which they called Paura, Mount Liebig and Peculiar.

== Social organization ==
The marriage rules of the Yumu were, as with the Ngalia, found to be identical to that of the Arrernte class system with the difference that prefixes were attached to the respective sexes, t(j)a- for males, and na- for females.

Men with skin name	Only marry women named	Sons will be	Daughters will be
Tjapaltjarri	Nakamarra	Tjungurrayi	Nungurrayi
Tjapangati	Nampitjinpa	Tjapanangka	Napanangka
Tjakamarra	Napaltjarri	Tjupurrula	Napurrula
Tjampitjinpa	Napangati	Tjangala	Nangala
Tjapanangka	Napurrula	Tjapangati	Napangati
Tjungurrayi	Nangala	Tjapaltjarri	Napaltjarri
Tjupurrula	Napanangka	Tjakamarra	Nakamarra
Tjangala	Nungurrayi	Tjampitjinpa	Nampitjinpa

== Myths ==
According to Géza Róheim, like the Pintupi, the Yumu believed that menstruation was induced by a hirsute demon (mamu) called 'hair-big' (Inyutalu) which penetrated the vagina, scratching it with his nails. (Note: Ted Strehlow had reservations about Róheim's reports, noting that he had never been inside the tribal territories and that his informants, knowing he was eager to obtain salacious details, supplied him liberally with anecdotes in order to barter with him. On the other hand, John Morton has recently argued;'Róheim's interpretation of childhood sexuality (is) a constructive force in the perpetuation of culture as historically significant. Róheim, I want to say, can be said to have uncovered the basic Freudian form of the social contract in Central Australia, shedding particular light on the place of child development in it, and it is this which needs to be compared with the modern imposition of the social contract from a large-scale, centralized, 'civilizing' government at the present time.')

== History of contact ==
According to Tindale, the majority of the Yumu people died as a consequence of an epidemic which swept their community between 1932 and 1940. A remnant of children were adopted into the Kukatja tribe thereafter. Their land was then claimed by the Ngalia as being mara windjul (unpossessed country). Both Margaret Heffernan and Sarah Holcombe, writing decades later, could find no evidence for their existence, (Note: "Heffernan found that the eastern neighbours of the Pintupi are the Mayutjarra (Kukatja) Like myself, Heffernan appears to have found no evidence of the 'Yumu', the name that Tindale gave to the peoples of Mount Liebig, Haasts Bluff and the Papunya region." (Holcombe 2016, p. 112)) while some early observers such as H. K. Fry considered them to be a branch of the Kukatja (Luritja).

== Alternative names ==
- Jumu
- Ngadadjara
- Ngatatara (Kukatja exonym) (Note: The reason for the Kukatja term is that the Yumu say ŋada/ŋata instead of the expected (by outsiders) naŋata. (Tindale 1974, pp. 227–228))
- Pa:kulja

Source: Tindale 1974, p. 228

== Sources ==
- Fry, H. K. (June 1934). "Kinship in Western Central Australia". Oceania. 4 (4): 472–478. doi:10.1002/j.1834-4461.1934.tb00123.x. JSTOR 27976165.
- Holcombe, Sarah (2016). "The interwoven histories of Mount Liebig and Papunya-Luritja". In Peterson, Nicolas; Myers, Fred (eds.). Experiments in self-determination: Histories of the outstation movement in Australia. Australian National University Press. pp. 105–119. ISBN 978-1-925-02290-2.
- Kenny, Anna (2013). The Aranda's Pepa: An introduction to Carl Strehlow's Masterpiece Die Aranda- und Loritja-Stämme in Zentral-Australien (1907-1920). Australian National University. ISBN 978-1-921-53677-9. JSTOR j.ctt5hgz6k.10.
- Morton, John (2013). "'Less was hidden' among these children': Géza Róheim, Anthropology and the Politics of Aboriginal Childhood". In Eickelkamp, Ute (ed.). Growing Up In Central Australia: New Anthropological Studies of Aboriginal Childhood and Adolescence. Berghahn Books. pp. 15–47. ISBN 978-1-782-38127-3.
- Róheim, Géza (1933). "Women and their life in Central Australia". Journal of the Royal Anthropological Institute. 63: 207–265. doi:10.2307/2843917. JSTOR 2843917.
- Strehlow, C. (1910). Leonhardi, Moritz von (ed.). Die Aranda- und Loritja-Stämme in Zentral-Australien Part 3 (PDF). Joseph Baer & Co.
- Strehlow, T. G. H. (1971). Songs of Central Australia. Angus and Robertson. ISBN 978-0-207-94657-8.
- Tindale, Norman Barnett (1974). "Jumu (NT)". Aboriginal Tribes of Australia: Their Terrain, Environmental Controls, Distribution, Limits, and Proper Names. Australian National University. ISBN 978-0-708-10741-6.
