= Walala Tjapaltjarri =

Australian Aboriginal artist

- Born: Walala Tjapangati early 1970s Marruwa, Western Australia
- Died: 2026; Alice Springs, Northern Territory
- Occupation: Painter
- Years active: late 1980s – present
- Organization: Papunya Tula
- Style: Western Desert art
- Spouse: Brigitte Napangardi
- Parents: Lanti, or "Joshua" (father); Watjunka Nangala (mother)
- Relatives: Thomas Tjapangati; Yalti Napangati; Yukultji Napangati; Warlimpirrnga Tjapaltjarri; Topsy Napaltjarri; Takariya Napaltjarri

Walala Tjapaltjarri (born Walala Tjapangati) was an Australian Aboriginal artist.

== Early life ==
Tjapaltjarri was born in the late 1960s or early 1970s. He was born at Marua, near Lake Mackay. He grew up living a nomadic, traditional way of life in the desert. His family had never come into contact with modern, Euro-Australian society. He had never seen a white person, and his family always thought the aeroplanes they saw flying overhead were ghosts or spirits. Before Tjapaltjarri was born, his father Lanti had lived for a short time at the mission in Balgo. But he had run away after getting into trouble for stealing food. It was his decision to stay in the desert, and kept his family far away from the towns. Tjapaltjarri's mother was named Watjunka, and he was Watjunka's only child. He also had two other mothers, Papunya and Nanu, who were his father's secondary wives (and his mother's sisters). His father and Watjunka both died when he was young. The family first came into contact with outsiders in October 1984, and were settled at Kiwirrkurra. He and his family became known as the last Aborigines living a traditional nomadic way of life in Australia.

== Painting ==
Tjapaltjarri began painting in December 1987, a few years after settling at Kiwirrkurra. He was introduced to painting by his cousin Warlimpirrnga. He taught Tjapaltjarri about using paints and canvas. Tjapaltjarri joined the Papunya Tula artists, and he, Thomas, and Warlimpirrnga eventually gained fame internationally as the Tjapaltjarri Brothers. Although he normally paints using Tjapaltjarri as a surname, Tjapaltjarri's skin name is Tjapangati. He worked on paper with a mixture of paint and traditional pigments.

His paintings depicted scenes from the Tingari cycle (sacred and secret songs about the ancestors of the Pintupi). He used only four colours at most, sticking to earthy, ochre colours to reflect the desert landscape. The places he depicted in his paintings were part of his traditional country, including Marruwa, Mintarnpi, Wanapatangu, Mina Mina, Naami, Yarrawangu and Wilkinkarra (Lake Mackay). These were places where the ancestors stopped for ceremonies when travelling across the country.

Tjapaltjarri used acrylic paintings on canvas. His early work was in the flowing "dot" style of painting typical of the Papunya Tula artists. His style became different during the late 1990s, and began to paint rigid rectangles, replacing dotted lines with thick, solid lines.

His first exhibition was in 1997, for the National Aboriginal and Torres Strait Islander Art Award in Darwin. Most of his work was shown in exhibitions alongside the works of other Aboriginal artists. He had paintings in permanent collections in Australia, Europe and the United States. Tjapaltjarri painted the most out of the three Tjapaltjarri brothers. When painting regularly, he earned up to AU$2000 a day. His paintings often sold for many thousands of dollars.

== Later life and death ==
Tjapaltjarri was married to Virginia and had a step-daughter. He lived between Kiwirrkura, Alice Springs, and Yuendumu, where his wife was from. He painted at Hoppy's Camp, outside Alice Springs.

Tjapaltjarri died in 2026 in Alice Springs after suffering a stroke.
