= Kaapa Tjampitjinpa =

Australian Aboriginal artist

Kaapa Mbitjana Tjampitjinpa
- Born: c. 1920; Napperby Station, Northern Territory
- Died: 1989 (aged 68–69)
- Known for: Painting
- Notable work: Gulgardi (1971)
- Movement: Contemporary Indigenous Australian art
- Awards: Alice Springs Caltex Art Award (1971)

Kaapa Mbitjana Tjampitjinpa (c. 1920 – 1989) was a contemporary Indigenous Australian artist of Anmatyerre, Warlpiri and Arrernte heritage. One of the earliest and most significant artists at Papunya in Australia's Northern Territory in the early 1970s, he was a founding member and inaugural chairman of the Papunya Tula artists company, and pivotal to the establishment of modern Indigenous Australian painting.

== Life ==
Kaapa (Note: Tjampitjinpa is a skin name, one of sixteen used to denote the subsections or subgroups in the kinship system of central Australian Indigenous people. These names define kinship relationships that influence preferred marriage partners and may be associated with particular totems. Although they may be used as terms of address, they are not surnames in the sense used by Europeans. Thus 'Kaapa Mbitjana' (usually abbreviated to 'Kaapa') is the element of the artist's name that is specifically his.) was born west of Napperby Station in the 1920s. His father was Kwalapa Tjangala, a senior Aboriginal man who had ritual responsibility for a site known as Warlugulong, which would subsequently be portrayed by several different artists in major paintings such as Warlugulong (1976) and Warlugulong (1977). Kaapa was initiated on Napperby Station, and was a stockman at nearby Mount Riddock Station.

Kaapa later worked on a station at Haasts Bluff. While he moved to Papunya in the 1960s, he also was present during the town's construction in the late 1950s. Once settled at Papunya, according to art historian Vivien Johnson, he was a drinker with a reputation as a troublemaker, "cattle duffer and grog runner". He was also charismatic and smart. White art teacher Geoffrey Bardon, who worked with Kaapa in the early 1970s, recalled him:

Kaapa was not as tall as many of the Anmatjira Aranda but he was very quick to see what others might not see at all. (I often thought he saw far too much, and perhaps this was why he drank more than he should.) He always moved in a fast, deft spring-walk, intense and convoluted as he whispered in his strange, pressed-together, mixed-up English...Kaapa was very bright, but very down to earth as well, an extraordinary survivor in a despairing environment. I remember him particularly for his intense way of seeming to be everywhere at all times, doing things mysteriously and well.

Husband to artist Eunice Napangati, Kaapa was also brother to artist Dinny Nolan Tjampitjinpa. Kaapa died in 1989.

== Art ==
For many years prior to the 1970s, Kaapa had been using traditional designs to create works of art for sale. These had included wooden carvings and watercolour paintings. In 1971 a local official, Jack Cooke, took six of Kaapa's paintings from Papunya into Alice Springs, entering one of them in a local competition, the Caltex Art Award. On 27 August that picture, Gulgardi, also referred to as Men’s Ceremony for the Kangaroo, Gulgardi, shared the first prize with a work by Jan Wesley Smith. It was the first work by an Indigenous Australian artist to win a contemporary art award, and the first public recognition of a Papunya painting.

Kaapa's paintings were probably the earliest to come out of Papunya and the art movement that subsequently made the settlement famous. Gulgardi was described by the National Gallery of Victoria: "Kaapa's work, with its pictorial elements and seductive delicacy of detail, is cultivated to appeal to the western gaze. It also recreates the dramatic spectacle of men participating in ceremony and creates an illusion of the third dimension." Kaapa was one of the senior men of Papunya who brought to Geoffrey Bardon a design they wanted to turn into a mural on the town's school building, and one of five artists who painted it on the school wall. Kaapa's win at the Caltex Awards, and the creation of the mural representing honey ant dreaming, were followed by an explosion of painting activity amongst the men of the community, including Kaapa, Billy Stockman Tjapaltjarri, Mick Namarari Tjapaltjarri, Johnny Warrangkula Tjupurrula, Tim Leura Tjapaltjarri and his brother Clifford Possum Tjapaltjarri, and others. Their first major collaborative work was destroyed in 1974 when the school building was repainted. However, a strong art movement was underway, with Kaapa at its centre. When, in 1972, the artists of Papunya decided to found a company to market their works, Kaapa was its inaugural chairman. He also played a role in spreading the movement to Yuendumu.

Most of the early works created by individual artists were small; Kaapa was an exception in choosing to use larger timber panels for his compositions.

== Legacy ==
Kaapa is widely credited as a founder, and sometimes the pivotal figure, in the establishment of contemporary Indigenous Australian art. His paintings can be found in the National Gallery of Australia, the Art Gallery of South Australia, the Art Gallery of Western Australia, the Tasmanian Museum and Art Gallery and the National Gallery of Victoria, while the National Museum of Australia also holds a number of his works. Internationally, his work can be found in the Kluge-Ruhe Aboriginal Art Collection of the University of Virginia and the Yale Peabody Museum of Natural History.

A painting by Kaapa, The Winparrku Serpents, was rendered in tapestry by the Victorian Tapestry Workshop for the Arts Centre Melbourne, and was the first of the Centre's tapestries. Three paintings by Kaapa have been listed on Australia's Movable Cultural Heritage Prohibited Exports Register. Inclusion on the register is confined to "objects of exceptional cultural importance, whose export would significantly diminish Australia's cultural heritage" and requires a permit to be issued for sale of the item outside Australia. Two of his works, Budgerigar Dreaming and Water Dreaming, both painted in 1972, in 2000 became the first works to be refused permits under the legislation.

== Bibliography ==
- Bardon, Geoffrey (1999). Papunya Tula: Art of the Western Desert. Adelaide: J.B. Books. ISBN 0958699860.
- Bardon, Geoffrey (2000). "The Papunya Tula Movement". In Sylvia Kleinert and Margot Neale (ed.). The Oxford Companion to Aboriginal Art and Culture. Oxford: Oxford University Press. ISBN 0-19-550649-9.
- Caruana, Wally (2003). Aboriginal Art (2nd ed.). London: Thames & Hudson. ISBN 9780500203668.
- Johnson, Vivien (2010). Once Upon a Time in Papunya. Sydney: University of New South Wales Press. ISBN 9781742230078.
- McCulloch, Alan; Susan McCulloch; Emily McCulloch Childs (2006). The new McCulloch's Encyclopedia of Australian Art. Fitzroy, Victoria: Aus Art Editions in association with The Miegunyah Press. ISBN 0-522-85317-X.
- Miller, Steven (2007). "Cultural capital: key moments in the collecting of Australian Indigenous art". In Hetti Perkins and Margie West (ed.). One Sun One Moon: Aboriginal Art in Australia. Sydney: Art Gallery of New South Wales. pp. 29–41. ISBN 978-0-7347-6360-0.
- Mundine, Djon (2009). "Save Your Pity: Master Works of the Western Desert". In Murphy, John (ed.). Gallery A Sydney 1964–1983. Campbelltown NSW and Newcastle NSW: Campbelltown Arts Centre and Newcastle Region Art Gallery. ISBN 9781875199679.
- Myers, Fred R. (2002). Painting Culture: The Making of an Aboriginal High Art. Durham: Duke University Press. ISBN 9780822329497.
- Perkins, Hetti; Fink, Hannah (2000). Papunya Tula: genesis and genius. Sydney: Art Gallery of New South Wales in association with Papunya Tula artists. ISBN 0-7347-6306-9.
- Perkins, Hetti; Fink, Hannah (2007). "Genesis and genius: the art of Papunya Tula artists". In Hetti Perkins and Margie West (ed.). One Sun One Moon: Aboriginal Art in Australia. Sydney: Art Gallery of New South Wales. pp. 181–189. ISBN 978-0-7347-6360-0.
