= Ngalia language =

Ngalia, Ngaliya or Ngalea may be,

- a dialect of the Warlpiri language in the Northern Territory, spoken by the Ngalia (Northern Territory)
- a dialect of the Western Desert Language, also known as Ooldean, in Western/Southern Australia spoken by the Ngalia people
