= Mick Namarari Tjapaltjarri =

Australian artist (1926–1998)

- Born: circa 1926; Walungurru (Kintore), Northern Territory, Australia
- Died: 16 August 1998 (aged 71–72); Alice Springs, Australia
- Other names: Japaltjarri, Old Mick Namarari, Numieri, Namari, Numerari, Namarari

Mick Namarari Tjapaltjarri (c. 1926 – August 16, 1998), was one of the most important painters to emerge from the Western Desert.

From the Pintupi language group, Mick Namarari was one of the foundation artists of the movement that emerged in Papunya Tula. White school teacher Geoffrey Bardon considered him one of eight artists whose efforts at the foundation of the movement were particularly interesting. The others were Old Walter Tjampitjinpa, Kaapa Tjampitjinpa, Clifford Possum Tjapaltjarri, Tim Leura Tjapaltjarri, Tim Payungka Tjapangati, Charlie Tarawa Tjungurrayi and Johnny Warangkula Tjupurrula.

From early figurative works, he moved on to creating large geometric designs that typified Papunya Tula art in the late 1970s and early 1980s. In the 1990s he began producing "minimalist" paintings that depicted the imprint of a kangaroo in the sand, the seeds that the marsupial mouse feeds upon, or the aftermath of hailstorms in the desert.

He died in Alice Springs in 1998.

== Collections ==
- National Gallery of Australia, Canberra
- National Gallery of Victoria, Melbourne
- Museum and Art Gallery of the Northern Territory, Darwin
- Kluge-Ruhe Aboriginal Art Collection, University of Virginia, Charlottesville

== Awards ==
=== Australia Council for the Arts ===
The Australia Council for the Arts arts funding and advisory body for the Government of Australia. Since 1993, it has awarded a Red Ochre Award. It is presented to an outstanding Indigenous Australian (Aboriginal Australian or Torres Strait Islander) artist for lifetime achievement.

Year	Nominee / work	Award	Result
1994	himself	Red Ochre Award	Awarded

== Bibliography ==
- Bardon, Geoffrey (1999). Papunya Tula: Art of the Western Desert. Adelaide: J.B. Books. ISBN 0958699860.
