= Soakage (source of water) =

Source of water in the deserts of Australia

A soakage, or soak, is a source of water in Australian deserts.

It is called thus because the water generally seeps into the sand, and is stored below, sometimes as part of an ephemeral river or creek.

== Aboriginal water source ==
Soakages were traditionally important sources of water for Aboriginal Australians in the desert, being the most dependable source in times of drought in Australia.

Aboriginal peoples would scoop out the sand or mud using a coolamon or woomera, often to a depth of several metres, until clean water gathered in the base of the hole. Knowing the precise location of each soakage was extremely valuable knowledge. It is also sometimes called a native well.

Anthropologist Donald Thomson wrote:

For a white man the difficulty in this country is that there is no way in which he can find the wells and soaks unless he does so by chance, and certainly nothing to indicate that the well is there, nor as a rule, even when the terrain and at least its superficial geological formation, the lie of the country, is examined, is there anything to explain the presence of water when he does find it

...

A lifetime of experience, backed by the traditional knowledge that is handed down from generation to generation, enables these people [the Pintupi in this instance] to judge, without having to visit a well that they know, whether it will still contain water and whether, if dry, with the sides fallen in and the well full of debris, it is worth cleaning out.

=== Cleaning and maintaining the well ===
Wells were covered to keep them free from fouling by animals. This involved blocking the well with dead branches and uprooted trees. When the wells fell into disrepair, people would bail the well, using the coolamon to throw slush against the wall. This would set like a cement wash and help to hold loose sand, preventing it from falling into the water.

Wells could be up to fifteen feet deep, with small toe holds cut into the walls.

== Recording well locations ==
Donald Thomson writes:

Just before we left, the old men recited to me the names of more than fifty waters – wells, rockholes and claypans ... this, in an area that the early explorers believed to be almost waterless, and where all but a few were, in 1957, still unknown to the white man. And on the eve of our going, Tjappanongo (Tjapanangka) produced spear-throwers, on the backs of which were designs deeply incised, more or less geometric in form. Sometimes with a stick, or with his finger, he would point to each well or rock hole in turn and recite its name, waiting for me to repeat it after him. Each time, the group of old men listened intently and grunted in approval – "Eh!" – or repeated the name again and listened once more. This process continued with the name of each water until they were satisfied with my pronunciation, when they would pass on to the next. I realized that here was the most important discovery of the expedition – that what Tjappanongo and the old men had shown me was really a map, highly conventionalized, like the works on a "message" or "letter" stick of the Aborigines, of the waters of the vast terrain over which the Bindibu hunted.

== White explorers and the wells ==
In the nineteenth century, both Warburton and Carnegie recorded that they had run down Aboriginal residents with camels and captured and chained them to compel them to reveal their secret sources of water. This action left a lasting impression on Aboriginal residents of desert regions, who would have handed accounts of this down through successive generations.

In the 1930s, when H. H. Finlayson made his journeys through the desert by camel, he noted that a gelded male camel, after a hard three-and-a-half-day journey in intense heat without water, drank 150 litres (33 imperial gallons) by actual measure without stopping, and fifteen minutes later, another 45 L (10 imp gal).

This sheds light on the resentment built up among the Aboriginal population against explorers for the exploitation and, by enlarging well entrances and digging out springs, the devastation of their precious water supplies to satisfy camel teams.

Don McLeod (Aboriginal rights activist, see Pilbara) also tells a story of clashes over soak water at the time of the gold rushes in Western Australia:

During the time of the Laverton rush, the Blackfellows tried to keep their meager water supplies hidden from the knowledge of white prospectors since their horses and camels quickly exhausted the limited soaks.

McLeod relates a story told to him by an old prospector by the name of Long, observing an Aboriginal man and woman:

The man took the throwing stick he was carrying and worked it into the sand. He then broke off a hollow reed and, placing it in the hole he had thus developed, lay down on his stomach and appeared to suck up something through the reed. His companion repeated his movements before they quietly moved on...

Without delay Long, with the aid of a shovel, proved the existence of a soak of sweet water, from which he replenished his supplies...Only a few days later in the same place, another prospector had the same Blackfellow bailed up, threatening to shoot him unless he revealed a source of water. This was certainly not an untypical bush encounter. However, [they were] interrupted by yet another prospector riding a camel. The Blackfellow took advantage of the confusion and threw a spear into the bush and escaped.

On the diggings, a hue and cry was raised over this alleged murderous attack and a party was quickly organised to set out and teach the Blackfellows a lesson – for daring to protect their water. Mustering what guns they could, the punitive party went out to what later became known as Skull Creek, and shot every Blackfellow they could find. The bodies were buried in shallow graves.

== See also ==
- Bindibu Expedition
- Canning Stock Route
- Claypan
- Groundwater
- Waterhole
- Soak dike
