= Bindibu expedition =

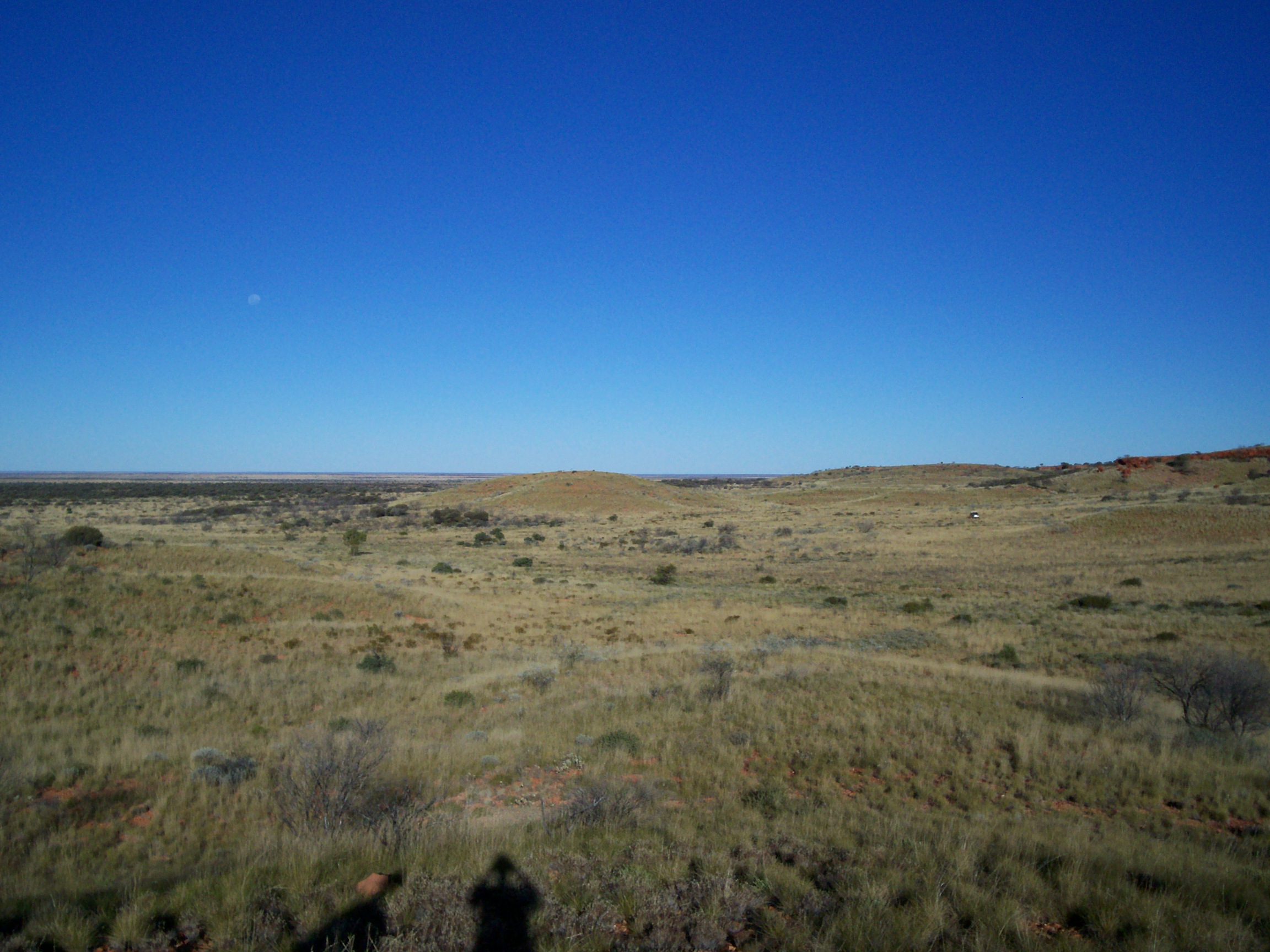
Gibson Desert, one of the places that the Bindibu Expedition visited

The Bindibu expedition was a series of three field trips mounted by anthropologist Donald Thomson to meet with and learn from Pintupi Indigenous Australians between 1957 and 1965.

Thomson travelled to the Great Sandy Desert and Gibson Desert – the Western Desert – one of the most inhospitable parts of the country, to meet with these people still living as they had done for many thousands of years.

The Pintupi (Bindibu) were the last Aboriginal group to make contact with Europeans over the period 1956 to 1984. Many Pintupi people still remember this experience. For many, Thomson was the first white man they had ever seen.

In this research he concentrated on Aboriginal hunting and gathering practices. He provided a collection of Pintupi material including photographs, notes and films, which now form part of invaluable museum collections.

Just before he left the people, they gave him an invaluable lesson on desert water, including an important "map" to assist its location. White people had long been puzzled as to how Aboriginal people could possibly find water in this harsh environment. Many desert explorers had captured Aboriginal people and used force and brutality to gain this vital knowledge – see for example, the history of the Canning Stock Route. Thomson writes:

Just before we left, the old men recited to me the names of more than fifty waters – wells, rockholes and claypans ... this, in an area that the early explorers believed to be almost waterless, and where all but a few were, in 1957, still unknown to the white man. And on the eve of our going, Tjappanongo (Tjapanangka) produced spear-throwers, on the backs of which were designs deeply incised, more or less geometric in form. Sometimes with a stick, or with his finger, he would point to each well or rock hole in turn and recite its name, waiting for me to repeat it after him. Each time, the group of old men listened intently and grunted in approval – "Eh!" – or repeated the name again and listened once more. This process continued with the name of each water until they were satisfied with my pronunciation, when they would pass on to the next.

I realized that here was the most important discovery of the expedition – that what Tjappanongo and the old men had shown me was really a map, highly conventionalized, like the works on a message or "letter" stick of the Aborigines, of the waters of the vast terrain over which the Bindibu hunted.

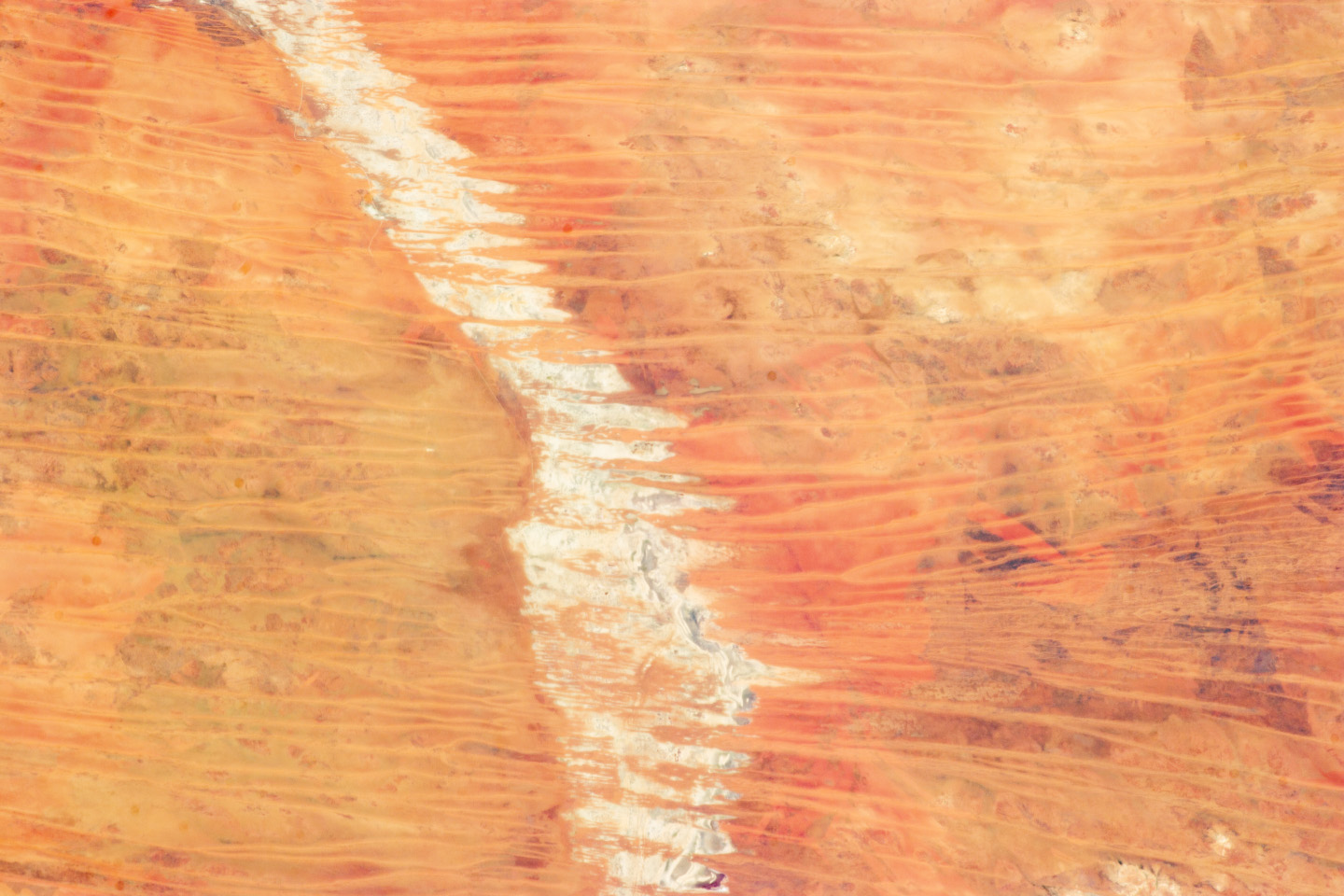
Satellite image of the Great Sandy Desert

— Donald Thomson

As well as writing in scholarly, anthropological journals, Thomson often filed articles back to many mainstream publications, such as The Australian Women's Weekly, about his findings in the Outback with the world's oldest surviving culture. He was often criticised for this for being low-brow. However, he defended his actions, realising the appeal and fascination of the ordinary Australian with the first Australians and their apparently simple, yet necessarily sophisticated, survival skills.

Thomson said of the Bindibu:

[They] have adapted themselves to that bitter environment so that they laugh deeply and grow the fattest babies in the world.

— Donald Thomson, Bindibu Country

== See also ==
- Pintupi
- Pintupi language
- Pintupi Nine
- Donald Thomson
