= Richters (Australian Aboriginal family) =

Aboriginal Australian family

The Richters or Rictors are an Aboriginal Australian family who are the last known Australian group to be living a hunter-gatherer way of life. They were located in the Great Victoria Desert in 1986.

They were undiscovered longer than the Pintupi Nine, who were found in the Gibson Desert in 1984 and proclaimed to be the "last of the nomads".

== History ==
Because the Great Victoria Desert was remote and unsuitable for mining and pastoral operation, contact between settlers and local Aboriginal people happened much later than in most of Australia. Aboriginal people left the area, partly moved on because of the rocket tests at Woomera, South Australia and the atomic bomb tests at Emu Field and Maralinga.

In 1986, Pila Nguru Aboriginal Corporation general manager Ian Baird travelled with Aboriginal elders into the Great Victoria Desert, where they found traces of a group still living in the desert. A few days later they tracked down the group of seven, who comprised four men (three of whom were brothers) along with two women and one little boy.

David Scrimgeour, a local doctor, examined the Richters as well as the Pintupi Nine. He found them in excellent physical health but assessed them as vulnerable to catching infectious diseases from the non-Aboriginal population. He said that they effectively set up a "quarantine" by living amongst their Aboriginal relatives and avoiding contact with the wider Australian population.

The family resettled in Tjuntjuntjara, Western Australia, and two of them still lived there as of 2023.
