= Naata Nungurrayi =

Australian Aboriginal artist (born 1932)

- Born: 1932; Kumil, Western Australia
- Died: 24 September 2021 (aged 88–89)

Naata Nungurrayi (1932 – 24 September 2021) was an Australian Aboriginal artist.

== Life ==
Nungurrayi was born at the site of Kumil, west of the Pollock Hills in Western Australia in 1932. She is from the Pintupi group from Kintore, Northern Territory and is one of the senior elders of the Kintore women artist movement.

Naata is the sister of George Tjungurrayi and Nancy Nungurrayi, and her son is Kenny Williams Tjampitjinpa who are all well-known artists.

One of her paintings appeared on Australia Post stamps in a 2003 special edition of Aboriginal art.

Naata Nungurrayi was named among the Top 50 of Australia’s Most Collectable Artists
