= Topsy Gibson Napaltjarri =

- Born: c.1950 Wirrulnga, near Kiwirrkurra Community, Western Australia
- Known for: Painting
- Relatives: Takariya Napaltjarri (sister)

Topsy Gibson Napaltjarri (born c. 1950), also known as Tjayika or Tjanika, is a Pintupi-speaking Indigenous artist from Australia's Western Desert region.

== Life ==
Topsy Gibson was the first child of Papalya Nangala and Waku Tjungurrayi, born circa 1950 at Wirrulnga, near Kiwirrkurra Community, Western Australia. The ambiguity around the year of birth is in part because Indigenous Australians operate using a different conception of time, often estimating dates through comparisons with the occurrence of other events.

'Napaljarri' (in Warlpiri) or 'Napaltjarri' (in Western Desert dialects) is a skin name, one of sixteen used to denote the subsections or subgroups in the kinship system of central Australian Indigenous people. These names define kinship relationships that influence preferred marriage partners and may be associated with particular totems. Although they may be used as terms of address, they are not surnames in the sense used by Europeans. Thus 'Topsy Gibson' is the element of the artist's name that is specifically hers.

Topsy Gibson married Tommy Tjakamarra, living first at Mount Doreen, north-west of Yuendumu, Northern Territory, then at Yuendumu and Papunya. Remarried to Tony Tjakamarra, she relocated to Balgo, Western Australia, before the couple settled in Kiwirrkurra in 1984. She has a son, and daughters Yalamay (born 1973) and Lynette (born 1976). As one of the native title holders for the Kiwirrkurra Area, Topsy Gibson is a member of Tjamu Tjamu Aboriginal Corporation.

== Art ==
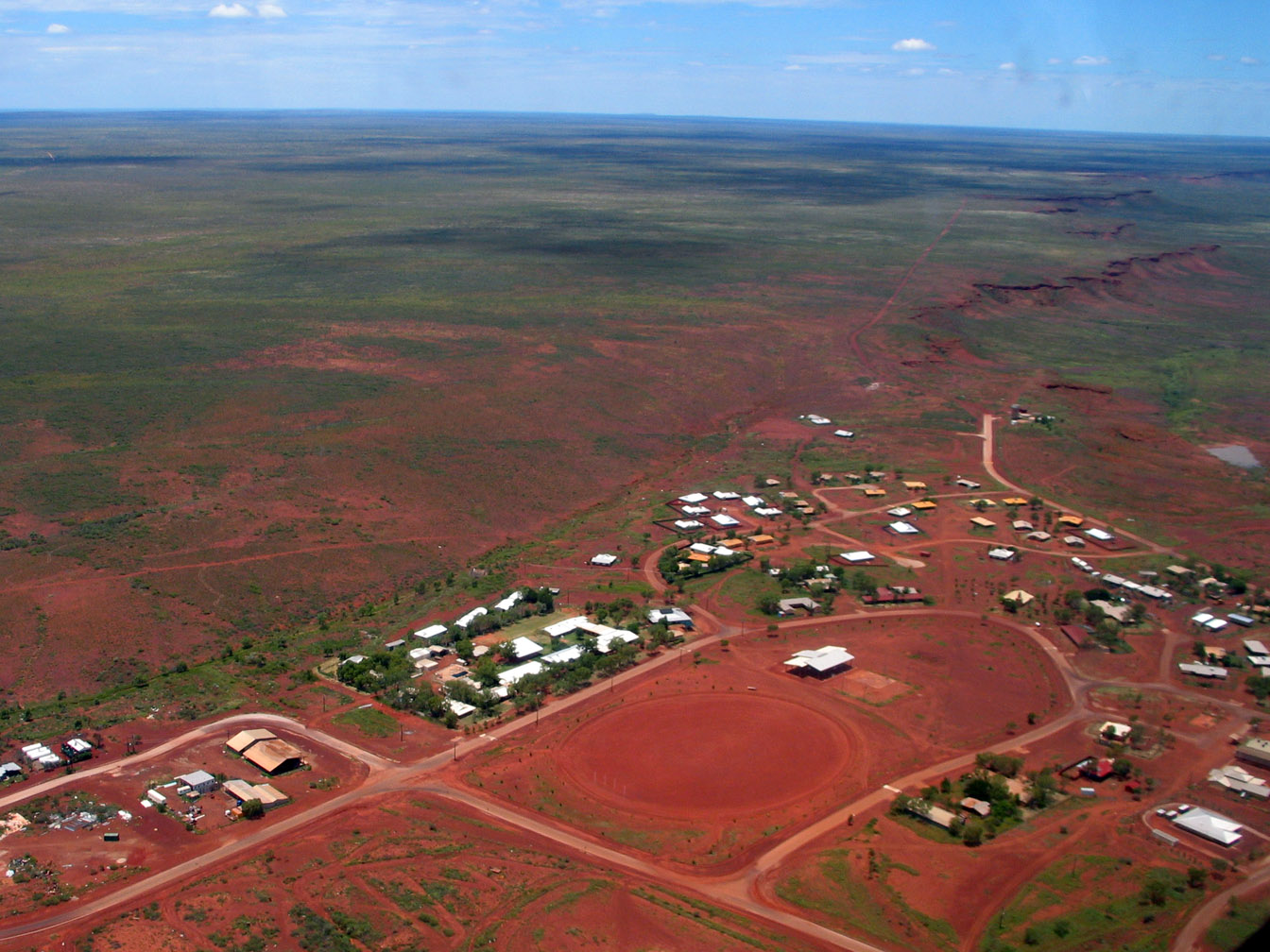
Balgo, Western Australia, the base of Warlayirti Artists, which represented Topsy Gibson.

=== Background ===
Contemporary Indigenous art of the western desert began when Indigenous men at Papunya began painting in 1971, assisted by teacher Geoffrey Bardon. Their work, which used acrylic paints to create designs representing body painting and ground sculptures, rapidly spread across Indigenous communities of central Australia, particularly following the commencement of a government-sanctioned art program in central Australia in 1983. By the 1980s and 1990s, such work was being exhibited internationally. The first artists, including all of the founders of the Papunya Tula artists' company, had been men, and there was resistance amongst the Pintupi men of central Australia to women painting. However, there was also a desire amongst many of the women to participate, and in the 1990s large numbers of them began to create paintings. In the western desert communities such as Kintore, Yuendumu, Balgo, and on the outstations, people were beginning to create art works expressly for exhibition and sale.

=== Career ===
Topsy, and her sister Takariya, both began to paint in 1996, while her younger brother Warlimirrnga Tjapaltjarri had begun painting in 1987. She has been represented by Warlayirti Artists, the Indigenous art centre at Balgo, Western Australia. Western Desert artists such as Topsy will frequently paint particular 'dreamings', or stories, for which they have personal responsibility or rights. In Topsy's case, these stories include Snake Dreaming and Minyma Kutjarra (or Two Women) Dreaming.
