= Walala Megodagammedda =

Coordinates: 7°20′N 80°41′E

- Village
- Interactive map of Walala Megodagammedda
- Country: Sri Lanka
- Province: Central Province
- Time zone: UTC+5:30 (Sri Lanka Standard Time)

Walala Megodagammedda is a village in Sri Lanka within the Central Province.

== See also ==
- List of towns in Central Province, Sri Lanka
