= Fred Myers =

American anthropologist

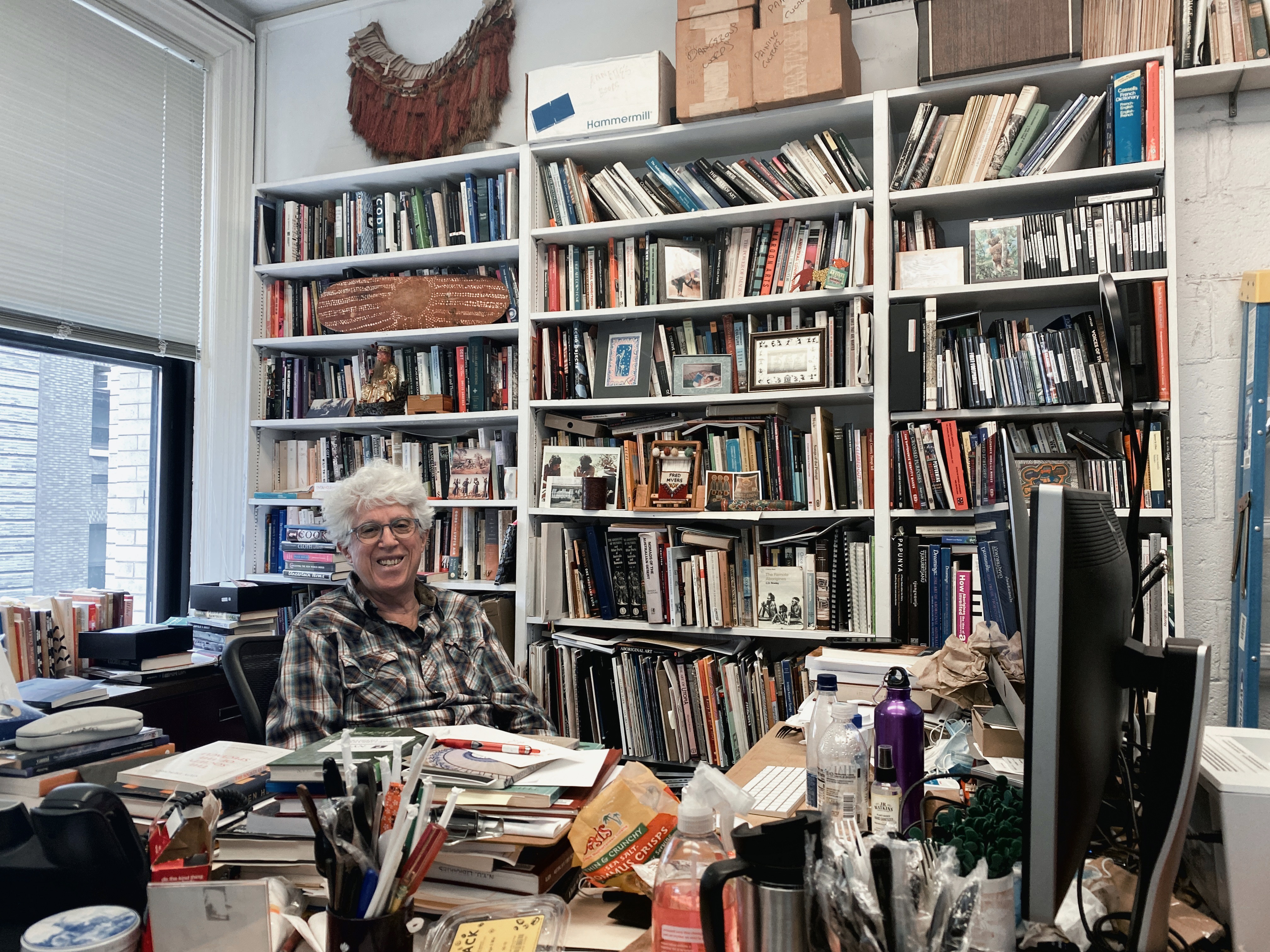
NYU Anthropology, Rufus D. Smith Hall, 25 Waverly Pl (Rm 602), New York, NY 10003

Fred R. Myers (born c. 1948) is an American anthropologist specializing in Indigenous Australian cultures, the anthropology of art, material culture, and the politics of cultural circulation. He is Silver Professor Emeritus of Anthropology at New York University, where he served on the faculty from 1982 until his retirement in 2025.

== Personal life ==
He lives in New York with his wife, Faye Ginsburg, who is also an anthropologist.

== Early career and fieldwork ==
Myers began his anthropological career in 1973 when he commenced doctoral fieldwork at the Pintupi outstation of Yayayi in Australia's Northern Territory. His initial research focused on personhood, emotions, and social organization among the Pintupi, a Western Desert Aboriginal group who had only recently established sustained contact with settler society. He completed his Ph.D. at Bryn Mawr College in 1976 with a dissertation titled "To Have and to Hold" : A Study of Persistence and Change in Pintupi Social Life, advised by Jane Goodale.

== Methodology ==
Myers developed a distinctive approach to understanding how Indigenous cultural forms—particularly paintings—move across cultural boundaries and acquire new meanings within different institutional contexts. This approach is most fully developed in his work examining the intersection of aesthetics, politics, and value: Painting Culture: The Making of an Aboriginal High Art (2002, Duke University Press), which explores how Aboriginal Australian acrylic paintings became recognized as "fine art" within Western art worlds while remaining deeply connected to Indigenous systems of knowledge, place, and identity. Myers' scholarship has been particularly attentive to the tensions that arise when sacred or restricted cultural materials enter public circulation, and to the ways Indigenous artists and communities navigate these challenges.

== Publications ==
Myers' first book, Pintupi Country, Pintupi Self: Sentiment, Place, and Politics among Western Desert Aborigines (1986), received the 1988 W.E.H. Stanner Prize from the Australian Institute of Aboriginal Studies. The work remains a foundational ethnography of Western Desert Aboriginal life and is one of the most cited volumes in the field of Indigenous Australian studies.

His second major monograph, Painting Culture: The Making of an Aboriginal High Art (2002), traces the emergence of the Papunya Tula painting movement and its transformation into a globally circulating art form. The book received the J.I. Staley Prize from the School of Advanced Research.

As an editor, Myers shaped important conversations in the discipline through volumes including The Traffic in Culture: Refiguring Anthropology and Art (1995, with George Marcus), The Empire of Things: Regimes of Value and Material Culture (2001), Experiments in Self-Determination: Histories of the Outstation Movement in Australia (2016, with Nicolas Peterson), and The Australian Art Field: Practices, Policies, Institutions (2020, with Tony Bennett, Deborah Stevenson, and Tamara Winikoff), which won the Best Anthology Prize from the Art Association of Australia and New Zealand.

== Films and curatorial work ==
Myers has produced several documentary films, including From the Dreaming: Aboriginal Art Arrives in New York (2001) and Remembering Yayayi (2014), the latter screening at the Margaret Mead Film Festival and the Jean Rouch International Film Festival. He curated exhibitions including "Virtuosity: The Evolution of Painting at Papunya Tula" at the Kluge-Ruhe Aboriginal Art Collection (2008) and co-edited the major catalogue Irrititja Kuwarri Tjungu (Past and Present Together): Fifty Years of Papunya Tula Artists (2022, with Henry Skeritt).

== Leadership ==
Myers served as Chair of the Department of Anthropology at NYU from 1991 to 2010, and as President of the American Ethnological Society from 2001 to 2003. He edited Cultural Anthropology from 1991 to 1995 and served on the editorial boards of numerous journals including American Anthropologist (1997–2001), American Ethnologist (1989–1994) , and Annual Review of Anthropology (2008–2012).

== Recognition ==
In addition to the Stanner and Staley prizes, Myers received a Guggenheim Fellowship (1989–90), a National Endowment for the Humanities Fellowship (1988–89), and was a Member of the School of Social Science at the Institute for Advanced Study, Princeton (1995–96). He was named Silver Professor of Anthropology at NYU in 2003.

== Bibliography ==
- Myers, Fred R. Pintupi Country, Pintupi Self: Sentiment, Place, and Politics among Western Desert Aborigines. Washington, D.C.: Smithsonian Institution Press, 1986. Reprinted in paperback by University of California Press, 1991.
- Brenneis, Donald, and Fred R. Myers, eds. Dangerous Words: Language and Politics in the Pacific. New York: New York University Press, 1984. Reprinted by Waveland Press, 1991.
- Marcus, George E., and Fred R. Myers, eds. The Traffic in Culture: Refiguring Anthropology and Art. Berkeley: University of California Press, 1995.
- Myers, Fred R., ed. The Empire of Things: Regimes of Value and Material Culture. Santa Fe: School of American Research Press, 2001.
- Myers, Fred R. Painting Culture: The Making of an Aboriginal High Art. Durham: Duke University Press, 2002.
- Peterson, Nicolas, and Fred R. Myers, eds. Experiments in Self-Determination: Histories of the Outstation Movement in Australia. Canberra: ANU Press, 2016.
- Bramblett, Lawrence, Fred R. Myers, and Tim Rowse, eds. The Difference That Identity Makes: Indigenous Cultural Capital in Australian Cultural Fields. Canberra: Aboriginal Studies Press, 2019.
- Bennett, Tony, Deborah Stevenson, Fred R. Myers, and Tamara Winikoff, eds. The Australian Art Field: Practices, Policies, Institutions. Routledge Research in Art History. London: Routledge, 2020.
- Myers, Fred R., and Henry Skerritt, eds. Irrititja Kuwarri Tjungu (Past and Present Together): Fifty Years of Papunya Tula Artists. Charlottesville: University of Virginia Press, 2022.
- Myers, Fred R., and Terry Smith. 2024. Six Paintings from Papunya: A Conversation. Durham: Duke University Press.
