= Takariya Napaltjarri =

Australian artist

- Born: Kiwirrkurra Community, Western Australia
- Style: Paint
- Spouses: Freddy West Tjakamarra; Richard Tjakamarra
- Relatives: Topsy Gibson Napaltjarri (sister)

Takariya Napaltjarri (also known as Takirriyanya or Doris) (born c. 1960) is an Indigenous artist from Australia's Western Desert region. She has painted with Papunya Tula artists' cooperative. First exhibited in 1996, her work is held in the collection of the Art Gallery of New South Wales.

== Life ==
Takariya was born around 1960 or 1965 in the desert near what is now Kiwirrkurra Community, Western Australia, on the Western Australia–Northern Territory border. Sources differ regarding her birth date: the Art Gallery of New South Wales indicates 1960, while expert Vivien Johnson reports two possible years, 1960 or 1965. The ambiguity around the year of birth is in part because Indigenous Australians operate using a different conception of time, often estimating dates through comparisons with the occurrence of other events.

'Napaljarri' (in Warlpiri) or 'Napaltjarri' (in Western Desert dialects) is a skin name, one of sixteen used to denote the subsections or subgroups in the kinship system of central Australian Indigenous people. These names define kinship relationships that influence preferred marriage partners and may be associated with particular totems. Although they may be used as terms of address, they are not surnames in the sense used by Europeans. Thus 'Takariya' is the element of the artist's name that is specifically hers.

Takariya's mother was Papalya Nangala and her father was Waku Tjungurrayi, whose decision to avoid contact with Europeans was responsible for the family group not entering any established settlement until 1984. Takariya's father died not long after she was born; she has siblings including older brother Warlimpirrnga Tjapaljarri and older sister Topsy Gibson Napaljarri, also an artist. Takariya married Freddy West Tjakamarra, however they later separated and she subsequently married Richard Tjakamarra and had a daughter Tatiga.

== Art ==
=== Background ===
Contemporary Indigenous art of the western desert began when Indigenous men at Papunya began painting in 1971, assisted by teacher Geoffrey Bardon. Their work, which used acrylic paints to create designs representing body painting and ground sculptures, rapidly spread across Indigenous communities of central Australia, particularly following the commencement of a government-sanctioned art program in central Australia in 1983. By the 1980s and 1990s, such work was being exhibited internationally. The first artists, including all of the founders of the Papunya Tula artists' company, had been men, and there was resistance amongst the Pintupi men of central Australia to women painting. However, there was also a desire amongst many of the women to participate, and in the 1990s large numbers of them began to create paintings. In the western desert communities such as Kintore, Yuendumu, Balgo, and on the outstations, people were beginning to create art works expressly for exhibition and sale.

=== Career ===
In 1996, Takariya was represented in the Papunya Women group exhibition at Utopia Art Gallery in Sydney, and in 1997 was included in the Bulada exhibition at the Art Gallery of New Wales. She has painted for the Warlayirti Artists at Balgo, as well as for Papunya Tula, the premier Indigenous art company set up by Indigenous artists in the 1970s. Her work was included in an exhibition of Papunya Tula paintings at Gallery Gabrielle Pizzi in 2007. Western Desert artists such as Biddy will frequently paint particular 'dreamings', or stories, for which they have personal responsibility or rights. Takariya "paints her mother's Minyma Kutjarra (Two Women) Dreaming for her country, which is south of Kiwirrkurra and includes Marrapinti, Ngalpurrunya, Ngaminya rockhole, Karilwara rockhole in the hills west of Pollock Hills in WA, and Wirrulnga rockhole east of Kiwirrkura where the Tingari Women passed travelling east towards Wilkinkarra".

Works by Takariya are held by the Art Gallery of New Wales, as well as in the private American collection of the Kelton Foundation.

== Collections ==
- Art Gallery of New South Wales
- Kelton Foundation
