= Billy Stockman Tjapaltjarri =

Aboriginal Australian artist

Billy Stockman Tjapaltjarri (c. 1927 – 5 September 2015) was an Anmatyerr Australian artist.

== Biography ==
He was born at Ilpitirri near Mount Denison, was one of Australia's best-known artists of the Western Desert Art Movement, Papunya Tula.

Tjapaltjarri's mother was killed in the Coniston Massacre in 1928 and his father was away from the camp hunting and survived. Tjapaltjarri was raised on Napperby Station by his aunt, the mother of Clifford Possum Tjapaltjarri. In the 1960s, he was working as a cook at Papunya when many of the Pintupi people were brought in from the west. Like Clifford, he began his artistic career carving wooden animals for the arts and crafts marketplace. He is credited with being one of the men who painted the Honey Ant Dreaming on the wall of the Papunya School at Geoff Bardon's request. In the 1970s, he was one of the first chairmen of Papunya Tula Pty Ltd.

His key paintings represent his Dreamings, including those of the budgerigar, spider, wallaby, yam and wild potato. He also painted about men's ceremony and Law.

Tjapaltjarri later moved west to Ilili, a pioneer in the Homelands movement, although in his later years he has spent much time in Alice Springs. He travelled to New York City in 1988 for the opening of the "Dreamings" show at the Asia Society and, along with Michael Nelson Jagamarra, created a sand painting as part of the exhibition.

He spent much of his later life in Alice Springs and died there on 5 September 2015, when a resident at Hettie Perkins Aged Care Home.

== Collections ==
Tjapaltjarri's works are in national collections in Australia:

- National Gallery of Australia, Canberra, Australia
- National Gallery of Victoria, Melbourne, Australia
- Art Gallery of South Australia, Adelaide, Australia
- Kluge-Ruhe Aboriginal Art Collection, University of Virginia, Charlottesville, United States

== See also ==
- Coniston massacre
