= Pintupi dialect =

Australian Aboriginal language

Pintupi
- Native to: Australia
- Region: Western Australia, Northern Territory; Papunya settlement, Yuendumu and Kintore, Balgo hills
- Ethnicity: Pintupi =? Ildawongga, ?Wenamba
- Native speakers: 271 (2021 census)
- Language family: Pama–Nyungan: Wati; Western Desert; Pintupi
- Dialects: Pintupi-Luritja

Language codes
- ISO 639-3: piu
- Glottolog: pint1250
- AIATSIS: C10 Pintupi
- ELP: Pintupi-Luritja
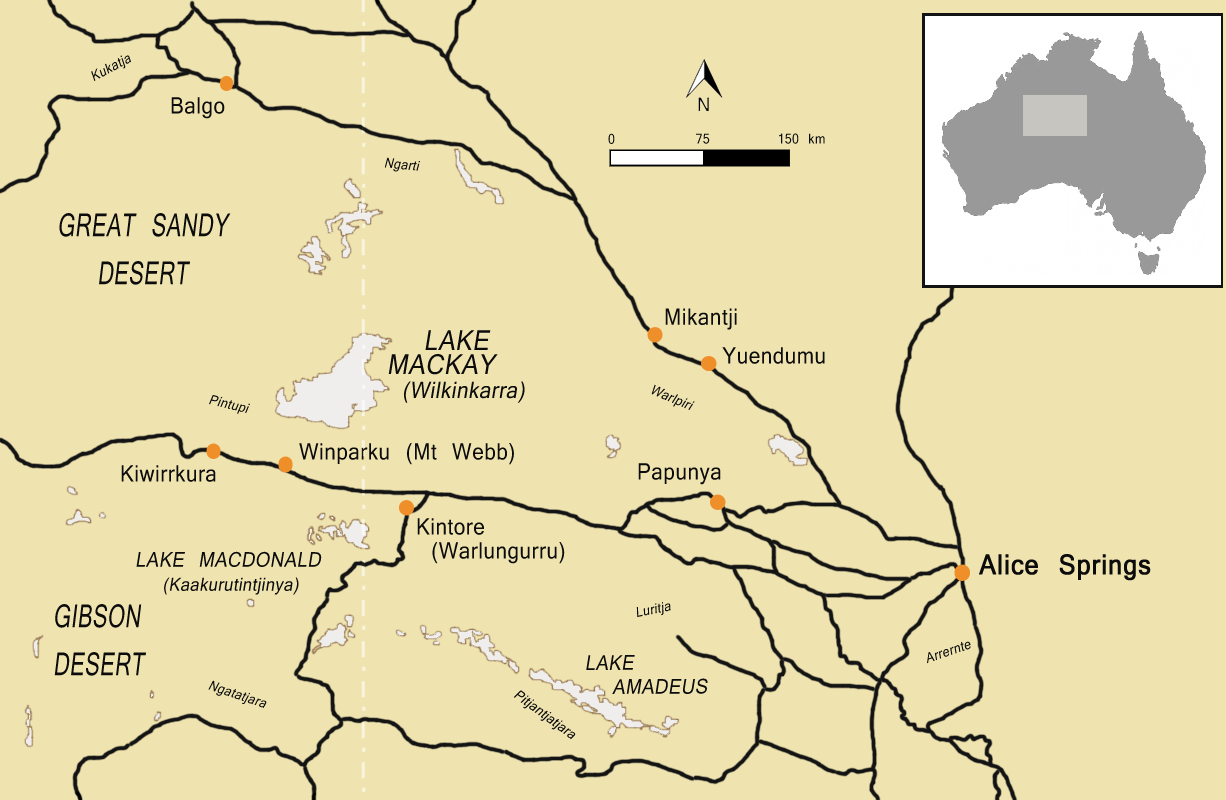

- Pintupi is classified as Vulnerable by the UNESCO Atlas of the World's Languages in Danger.

Pintupi (/ˈpɪntəpi, ˈpɪnə-, -bi/) is an Australian Aboriginal language. It is one of the Wati languages of the large Pama–Nyungan family. It is one of the varieties of the Western Desert Language (WDL).

Pintupi is a variety of the Western Desert Language spoken by indigenous people whose traditional lands are in the area between Lake Macdonald and Lake Mackay, stretching from Mount Liebig in the Northern Territory to Jupiter Well (west of Pollock Hills) in Western Australia. These people moved (or were forced to move) into the indigenous communities of Papunya and Haasts Bluff in the west of the Northern Territory in the 1940s–1980s. The last Pintupi people to leave their traditional lifestyle in the desert came into Kiwirrkura in 1984. Over recent decades they have moved back into their traditional country, setting up the communities of Kintore (in Pintupi known as Walungurru) in the Northern Territory, Kiwirrkura and Jupiter Well (in Pintupi Puntutjarrpa) in Western Australia.

Children who were born in Papunya and Haasts Bluff grew up speaking a new variety of Pintupi, now known as Pintupi-Luritja, due to their close contact with speakers of Arrernte, Warlpiri and other varieties of the WDL. This has continued through the moves west so that most Pintupi people today speak Pintupi-Luritja, although there remains a clear distinction between the more western and eastern varieties.

Pintupi is one of the healthier Aboriginal languages and is taught to local children in schools.

== Phonology ==
The phonology of Pintupi has been described by K. C. and L. E. Hansen based on fieldwork conducted in Papunya, Northern Territory in 1967–1968.

=== Consonants ===
Pintupi has 17 consonant phonemes. The symbols used in the practical orthography are shown in brackets where they differ from the IPA symbols.

	Peripheral		Coronal			Lamino- palatal
	Bilabial	Velar	Apico- alveolar	Apico- retroflex	Lamino- alveolar	Lamino- palatal
Plosive	p	k	t	ʈ ⟨ṯ⟩	t̻ ⟨tj⟩	
Nasal	m	ŋ ⟨ng⟩	n	ɳ ⟨ṉ⟩	n̻ ⟨ny⟩	
Trill			r ⟨rr⟩			
Lateral			l	ɭ ⟨ḻ⟩	l̻ ⟨ly⟩	
Approximant	w		ɻ ⟨r⟩			j ⟨y⟩

The lamino-alveolars are frequently palatalised [t̻ʲ, n̻ʲ, l̻ʲ], and /t̻/ often has an affricated allophone [tˢ].

The trill /r/ usually has a single contact (i.e. a flap [ɾ]) in ordinary speech, but multiple contacts (a true trill) in slow, emphatic, or angry speech. The retroflex approximant /ɻ/ may also be realised as a flap [ɽ].

Hansen and Hansen (1969) refer to the retroflex consonants as "apico-domal".

=== Vowels ===
Pintupi has six vowel phonemes, three long and three short. All are monophthongal at the phonemic level. Again, the symbols used in the practical orthography are shown enclosed in brackets where they differ from the phonemic symbols.

Vowel phonemes
	Front	Back
Close	i iː ⟨ii⟩	u uː ⟨uu⟩
Open	a aː ⟨aa⟩	

The short vowel phonemes are devoiced when word-final at the end of a clause, as in [ŋurakutulpi̥] 'he finally (came) to camp', [kapilat̻uɻḁ] 'we all (brought) water for him', and [jilariŋu̥] 'it was close'.

Short vowels are rhotacised before retroflex consonants, as in [wa˞ʈa] 'tree (generic)', [ka˞ɳa] 'spear (one type)', and [mu˞ɭi] 'a shelter'.

The open vowel /a/ is diphthongised to [aⁱ] and [aᵘ] before /j/ and /w/ respectively, as in [waⁱjunpuwa] 'pare (it)' and [kaᵘwu˞ɳpa] 'cold ashes'.

=== Orthography ===
An orthography was developed by the Hansens and is used in their publications, which include a dictionary, a grammar sketch and bible portions. This orthography is also used in the bilingual school, and especially in the school's Literature Production Centre. The orthography is shown in the above tables of consonants and vowels.

=== Phonotactics ===
Pintupi has only two possible syllable types: CV (a consonant followed by a vowel) and CVC (consonant-vowel-consonant). In the middle of a word, /m/ and /ŋ/ may appear in the syllable coda only when followed by a homorganic plosive, as in /t̻ampu/ 'left side' and /miŋkiɻi/ 'mouse'. Otherwise, only coronal sonorants may appear in the syllable coda. All consonants except the apico-alveolars and /l̻/ may appear in word-initial position; only coronal sonorants (except /ɻ/) may appear in word-final position. However, at the end of a clause, the syllable /pa/ is added to consonant-final words, so consonants may not appear in clause-final position.

Short vowels may appear anywhere in the word; long vowels may appear only in the first syllable (which is stressed), as in /ɳiːrki/ 'eagle' and /maːra/ 'ignorant'.

=== Phonological processes ===
When a suffix-initial /t/ follows a root-final consonant, the /t/ assimilates in place of articulation to the preceding consonant, as in /maɭan̻ + tu/ → [maɭan̻t̻u] 'younger sibling (transitive subject)', /pawuɭ + ta/ → [pawuɭʈa] 'at the spirit ground'. However, the sequence /r + t/ undergoes coalescence and surfaces as simple [ʈ], as in /t̻intar + ta/ → [t̻intaʈa] 'at Tjintar'.

When two identical CV sequences meet at a word boundary, they undergo haplology and fuse into a single word in rapid speech, as in /mutikajiŋka kaɭpakatiŋu/ → [mutikajiŋkaɭpakatiŋu] 'climbed into the car' and /parariŋu ŋuɻurpa/ → [parariŋuɻurpa] 'went around the middle'. When a lamino-alveolar consonant or /j/ is followed by /a/ in the last syllable of a word, and the next word begins with /ja/, the word-initial /j/ is deleted and the two adjacent /a/-sounds merge into a long /aː/, as in /ŋal̻a januja/ → [ŋal̻aːnuja] 'they all came' and /wija japura/ → [wijaːpura] 'not west'.

=== Prosody ===
Pintupi words are stressed on the first syllable. In careful speech, every second syllable after that (i.e. the third, fifth, seventh, etc.) may receive a secondary stress, but secondary stress never falls on the final syllable of the word, as in [ˈt̻akaˌmaraˌkuɳaɻa] 'for the benefit of Tjakamara' and [ˈjumaˌɻiŋkaˌmaraˌt̻uɻaka] 'because of mother-in-law'. However, the particle /ka/ (which indicates a change of subject) is not stressed when it is the first morpheme in a clause, as in /kaˈjanu/ '(he) went'.

== Works in the language ==
=== Universal Declaration of Human Rights ===
Pintupi-Luritja became the first Indigenous Australian language to receive a full, official translation of the Universal Declaration of Human Rights, when it was translated by elders and linguists at the Australian National University in 2015. Below is Article 1 in Pintupi-Luritja:

Nganana maru tjuta, tjulkura tjuta, manta yurungka parrari nyinapayi tjutanya liipulala nyinanyi, nganana yanangu maru tjuta wiya kuyakuya. Yuwankarrangkuya palya nintingku kulini. Tjanaya palya kutjupa tjutaku tjukarurru nyinanytjaku, walytja tjuta nguwanpa, mingarrtjuwiya. Tjungungku palyangku kurrunpa kutjungku. Wangka ngaangku nganananya tjakultjunanyi rapa ngaranytjaku kutjupa tjuta nguwanpa.

== See also ==
- Pintupi
- Bindibu Expedition
- List of Indigenous Australian group names

== Bibliography ==
- Hansen, K.C.; L. E. Hansen (1974). The Core of Pintupi Grammar. Alice Springs, Northern Territory: Institute for Aboriginal Development.
- Hansen, K.C.; L. E. Hansen (1978). Pintupi/Luritja Dictionary. Alice Springs, Northern Territory: Institute for Aboriginal Development. ISBN 0-949659-63-0.
- Hansen, K.C.; L. E. Hansen (1981). Katutjalu Watjantja Yirrititjanu. Adelaide, South Australia: Lutheran Publishing House.
