= Ngalia (Northern Territory) =

Indigenous Australian people

The Ngaliya (Ngalia) are an indigenous Australian people of the Northern Territory who speak a dialect of the Warlpiri language. They are not to be confused with the Ngalia of the Western Desert.

== Country ==
The traditional lands of the Ngalia, in Norman Tindale 's estimation, extended over some 11,200 square miles (29,000 km^{2}). He places them to the north of Stuart Bluff Range from West Bluff west to Mounts Cockburn and Carey, at mounts Ethel Creek, Farewell, Singleton, Saxby and Doreen. Their territory also took in Cockatoo Creek, the Treuer Range, Mount Davenport and Vaughan Springs (aka Pikilji/Pikilyi).

== History of contact ==
Carl Strehlow was the first outsider to mention the Ngalia. Some studies were made of them in August 1931, and in the same month in 1952, at Cockatoo Creek by members of anthropological expeditions from the University of Adelaide. On the first occasion, one Ngalia youth, advancing through the degrees of his initiation, recited a list of over 300 toponyms referring to the totemic sites along his tribe's dreaming tracks which he had visited the year before as part of his education. The landscape names remained unpublished because of the complexities of pinning down the precise location of each place name in this initiatory journey. Charles P. Mountford published a work detailing the 'totemic topography' marked by the travels of the serpent Jarapiri as it slithered across Warlpiri and Ngalia country, to Wimbaraku, situated between Mount Liebig and Haast's Bluff.

In the early 1950s their numbers were estimated to be 300-400.

== Alternative names ==
- Ngalea
- Ngallia
- Nanbuda
- Ngarilia (typo)
- Ngali
- Njalia (a blunder)
- Wawilja (Warlpiri exonym)
- Warniaka
- Waneiga (exonym)
- Nambulatji (Balgo Gugadja exonym)
- Jalpiri

== Sources ==
- Abbie, A. A.; Adey, W. R. (September 1953). "Pigmentation in a Central Australian tribe with special reference to fair-headedness". American Journal of Physical Anthropology. 11 (3): 339–359. doi:10.1002/ajpa.1330110310. PMID 13104649.
- Cleland, J. B.; Tindale, N. (1954). "Ecological surroundings of the Ngalia natives in Central Australia and native names and uses of plants". Transactions of the Royal Society of South Australia. 77: 81–86.
- Elkin, A. P. (September 1969). "Review: Winbaraku and the Myth of Jarapiri by C. P. Mountford". Oceania. 40 (1): 79–80. doi:10.1002/j.1834-4461.1969.tb01062.x. JSTOR 40329837.
- Fry, H. K. (June 1934). "Kinship in Western Central Australia". Oceania. 4 (4): 472–478. doi:10.1002/j.1834-4461.1934.tb00123.x. JSTOR 27976165.
- Mountford, Charles P. (1968). Winbaraku and the Myth of Jarapiri. Adelaide: Rigby.
- Róheim, Géza (1933). "Women and their life in Central Australia". Journal of the Royal Anthropological Institute. 63: 207–265. doi:10.2307/2843917. JSTOR 2843917.
- Strehlow, C. (1910). Leonhardi, Moritz von (ed.). Die Aranda- und Loritja-Stämme in Zentral-Australien Part 3 (PDF). Joseph Baer & Co.
- Tindale, Norman Barnett (1946). "Australian (Aborigine)". In Shipley, Joseph T. (ed.). Encyclopedia of Literature. Vol. 1. Philosophical Library. pp. 74–78.
- Tindale, Norman Barnett (1974). "Ngalia (NT)". Aboriginal Tribes of Australia: Their Terrain, Environmental Controls, Distribution, Limits, and Proper Names. Australian National University. ISBN 978-0-708-10741-6.
