= Pintupi =

Indigenous Australian people

The Pintupi are an Australian Aboriginal group who are part of the Western Desert cultural group (Note: Down at least to the 1950s, 'All the Western Desert people in those days were called Pintupi') whose Country (Note: '“Country” should be capitalised, as it has a similar meaning to Aboriginal peoples as “Australia” has to non-Aboriginal peoples.') is in the area west of Lake Macdonald and Lake Mackay in Western Australia. These people moved (or were moved) into the Aboriginal communities of Papunya and Haasts Bluff in the west of the Northern Territory in the 1940s–1980s. The last Pintupi to leave their traditional lifestyle in the desert, in 1984, are a group known as the Pintupi Nine, also sometimes called the "lost tribe".

Over recent decades groups of Pintupi have moved back to their traditional country, as part of what has come to be called the outstation movement. These groups set up the communities of Kintore (Walungurru in Pintupi) in the Northern Territory, Kiwirrkura and Jupiter Well (in Pintupi: Puntutjarrpa) in Western Australia. There was also a recent dramatic increase in Pintupi populations and speakers of the Pintupi language.

== Country ==
Pintupi lands, in Tindale's estimation, spread over roughly 8,000 square miles (21,000 km^{2}), embracing the areas of Lake Mackay, Lake Macdonald, Mount Russell, the Ehrenberg and Kintore ranges and Warman Rocks. Their western extension ran to near Winbaruku, while their southern frontier was in the vicinity of Johnstone Hill.

== History ==
Inhabiting a very remote part of Australia, the Pintupi were among the last Aboriginal Australians to leave their traditional lifestyle. For many, this occurred as a result of the Blue Streak missile tests which began in the 1960s. As these missiles would have a trajectory landing in the desert areas known to still be inhabited, government officials decided that these people should be relocated. A number of trips were made to the area and Aboriginal people were located and moved (or encouraged to move) into one of the settlements on the eastern fringe of the desert, such as Haasts Bluff, Hermannsburg and Papunya. As a result of different people leaving the desert at different times and in different directions, Pintupi have wound up living at a variety of communities around the edge of the desert, including Warburton, Kaltukatjara (formerly known as Docker River), Balgo and Mulan, but the majority reside at the major Pintupi communities of Kintore, Kiwirrkura and Papunya.

In the 1960s, the Menzies Liberal government forced the removal of traditional-living Pintupi to settlements east of their country, closer to Alice Springs. The government argued that they were not ready to live in modern society and needed to be re-educated before assimilation into white society. In practice, this meant relocation from their traditional lands and suppression of their language, art and culture.

This policy also involved the forced removal of thousands of Aboriginal children from their parents and their dispersal into government or religious institutions or foster care (see Stolen Generation).

At Papunya, a government settlement, Pintupi mixed with Warlpiri, Arrernte, Anmatyerre and Luritja language groups, but formed the largest language group. Conditions were so bad that 129 people, or almost one-sixth of the residents, died of treatable diseases such as hepatitis, meningitis and encephalitis between 1962 and 1966.

== Pintupi kinship ==
In common with neighbouring groups, such as the Warlpiri, the Pintupi have a complex kinship system, with eight different kin groups, made more so by distinct prefixes for male and female skin names, "Tj" for males and "N" for females. (Note: Of the contiguous Ngalia and Yumu, Fry writes that the system of subsection names were those of the Luritja, consisting of the Aranda terms prefixed with ta for males, and na for females. (Fry 1934, p. 472))

The Pintupi refer to places and their attached dreaming stories by the skin names of their owners or ancestral heroes which passed through the area. This is done to both record the stories of Dreamtime figures and keep record of the complex Pintupi kinship structure.

== Prominent Pintupi ==
- Anatjari Tjakamarra
- Kaapa Tjampitjinpa
- Mick Namarari Tjapaltjarri
- Clifford Possum Tjapaltjarri
- Billy Stockman Tjapaltjarri
- Timmy Payungka Tjapangati
- Turkey Tolson Tjupurrula
- Eileen Napaltjarri
- Tjunkiya Napaltjarri
- Wintjiya Napaltjarri
- Makinti Napanangka
- Naata Nungurrayi
- Ningura Napurrula

== See also ==
- Geoff Bardon
- Bindibu expedition
- Honey ant dreaming
- Pintupi language
- Pintupi Nine
- "Beds Are Burning" - a rock and roll protest song by Midnight Oil band about the Pintupi struggles

== Sources ==
- "Ethnologue".
- Fry, H. K. (March 1933). "Body and Soul: A Study from Western Central Australia". Oceania. 3 (3): 247–256. doi:10.1002/j.1834-4461.1933.tb00073.x. JSTOR 40327416.
- Fry, H. K. (June 1934). "Kinship in Western Central Australia". Oceania. 4 (4): 472–478. doi:10.1002/j.1834-4461.1934.tb00123.x. JSTOR 27976165.
- Fuller, Robert S. (2020). The astronomy and songline connections of the saltwater Aboriginal peoples of the New South Wales coast (Thesis). University of New South Wales. pp. 1–451.
- Goodall, Heather (1996). "Land and Meanings". Invasion to embassy : land in Aboriginal politics in New South Wales, 1770-1972. Sydney University Press. ISBN 978-1-920-89858-8.
- Holcombe, Sarah (June 2004). "The Politico-Historical Construction of the Pintupi Luritja and the Concept of Tribe". Oceania. 74 (4): 257–275. doi:10.1002/j.1834-4461.2004.tb02854.x. JSTOR 40332067.
- Kimber, R.G. (1982). "WALAWURRU, The Giant Eaglehawk: Aboriginal Reminiscences of Aircraft in Central Australia 1921-1931". Aboriginal History. 6 (1/2): 49–60. JSTOR 24045547.
- McKenzie, Janet (7 May 2008). "Papunya painting out of the desert". Studio International.
- Myers, Fred R. (1979). "The Logic and Meaning of Anger Among Pintupi Aborigines". Ethos. 7 (4): 343–370. doi:10.1525/eth.1979.7.4.02a00030. JSTOR 640015.
- Myers, Fred R. (December 1988). "The Logic and Meaning of Anger Among Pintupi Aborigines". Man. 23 (4): 589–610. doi:10.2307/2802595. JSTOR 2802595.
- Sweeney, Paul (8 March 2015). "Papunya, Kintore (Walungurru) & Kiwirrkura: Beyond Sacred:Australian Aboriginal Arrt, the Laverty Collection". deutscher and hackett.
- Tindale, Norman Barnett (1974). "Pintubi (NT)". Aboriginal Tribes of Australia: Their Terrain, Environmental Controls, Distribution, Limits, and Proper Names. Australian National University. ISBN 978-0-708-10741-6. Archived from the original on 20 March 2020.
