= Papunya =

- Town
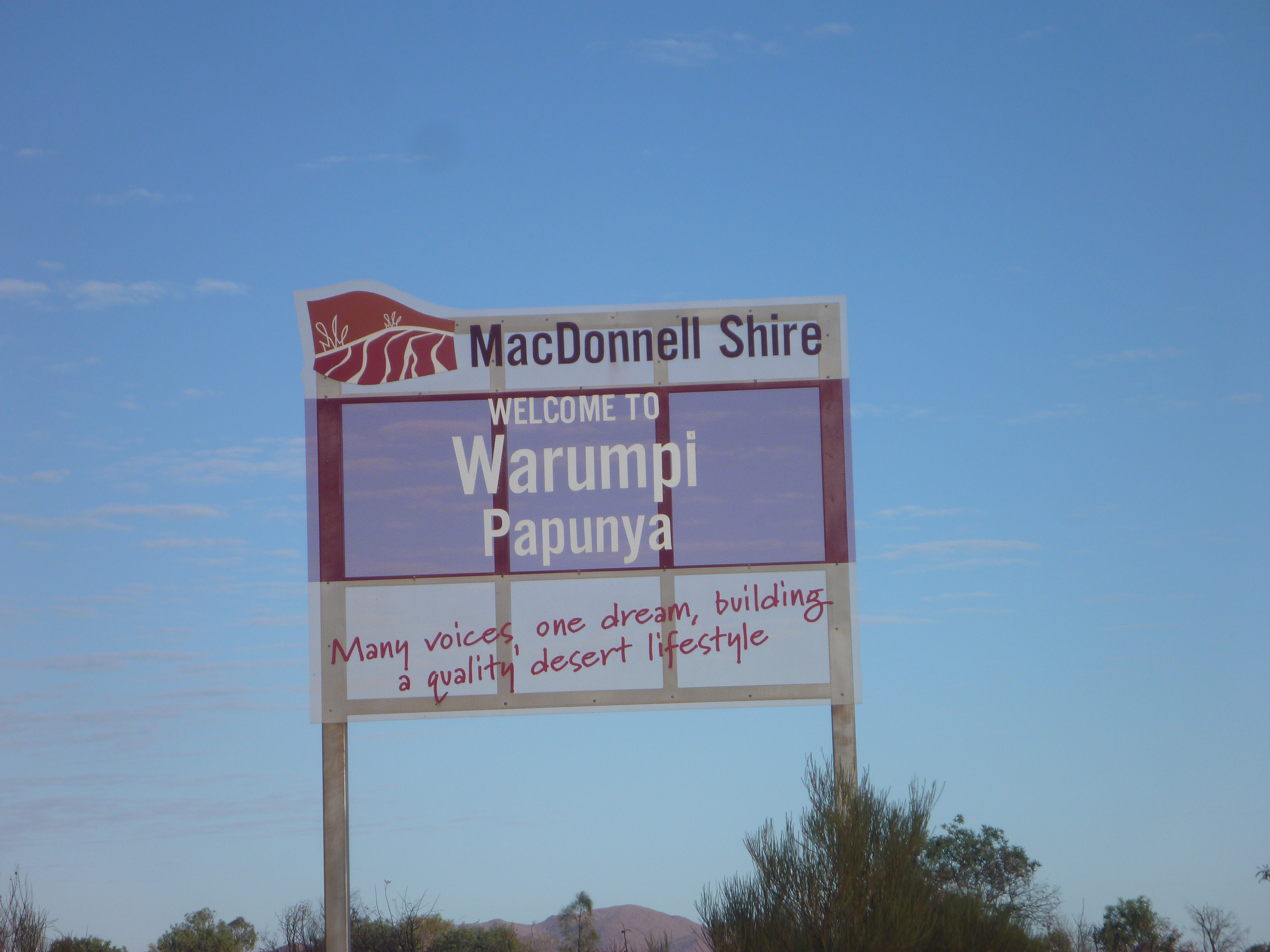

- Coordinates: 23°13′S 131°54′E
- Country: Australia
- State: Northern Territory
- Location: 240 km (150 mi) NW of Alice Springs

Population
  - Total: 404 (2016 census)

Papunya (Pintupi-Luritja: Warumpi) is a small Indigenous Australian community roughly 240 kilometres (150 mi) northwest of Alice Springs (Mparntwe) in the Northern Territory, Australia. It is known as an important centre for Contemporary Indigenous Australian art, in particular the style created by the Papunya Tula artists in the 1970s, referred to colloquially as dot painting. Its population in 2016 was 404.

== History ==
Pintupi and Luritja people were forced off their traditional country in the 1930s and moved into Hermannsburg (Ntaria) and Haasts Bluff, where there were government ration depots. There were often tragic confrontations between these people, with their nomadic hunter-gathering lifestyle, and the cattlemen who were moving into the country and over-using the limited water supplies of the region for their cattle.

The Australian Government built a water bore and some basic housing at Papunya in the 1950s to provide room for the increasing populations of people in the already-established Aboriginal communities and reserves. The community grew to over a thousand people in the early 1970s and was plagued by poor living conditions, health problems, and tensions between various tribal and linguistic groups. These festering problems led many people, especially the Pintupi, to move further west closer to their traditional country. After settling in a series of outstations, with little or no support from the government, the new community of Kintore was established about 250 kilometres (160 mi)west of Papunya in the early 1980s.

The term "Finke River Mission" was initially an alternative name for the mission at Hermannsburg, but this name was later often used to include the settlements at Haasts Bluff, Areyonga and, later, Papunya. It now refers to all Lutheran missionary activity in Central Australia since the first mission was established at Hermannsburg in 1877.

== Description and demographics ==
It is now home to a number of displaced Aboriginal people, mainly from the Pintupi and Luritja groups. At the 2016 Australian census, Papunya had a population of 404.

The predominant religion at Papunya is Lutheranism, with 310 members, or 78.7% of the population, based on the 2016 census.

It is the closest town to the Australian continental pole of inaccessibility. Papunya is on restricted Aboriginal land and requires a permit to enter or travel through.

Warumpi Band were an Australian country and Aboriginal rock group which formed in Papunya.

== Art and culture ==
=== Papunya Tula ===
During the 1970s a striking new art style emerged in Papunya, which by the 1980s began to attract national and then international attention as a significant Indigenous art movement, colloquially known as dot painting. Leading exponents of the style, who belonged to the Papunya Tula art cooperative founded in Papunya in 1972, included Clifford Possum Tjapaltjarri, Billy Stockman Tjapaltjarri, Kaapa Tjampitjinpa, Turkey Tolson Tjupurrula, and Pansy Napangardi. The company now operates out of Alice Springs, and covers an enormous area, extending into Western Australia, 700 kilometres (430 mi) west of Alice Springs.

=== Papunya Tjupi Arts ===
Papunya Tjupi Arts, a community-based, 100% Aboriginal-owned arts organisation, commenced in 2007, and as of March 2021 hosts around 150 artists, many of whose works are featured in exhibitions and galleries around the world. In 2009, Michael Nelson Tjakamarra (Kumantje Jagamara) became the artist leader at the arts centre.

Artists include Doris Bush Nungarrayi, Maureen Poulson, Charlotte Phillipus Napurrula, Tilau Nangala, Mona Nangala, Nellie Nangala, Carbiene McDonald Tjangala, Martha McDonald Napaltjarri, Candy Nelson Nakamarra, Dennis Nelson Tjakamarra, Narlie Nelson Nakamarra, Isobel Major Nampatjimpa, Isobel Gorey, Mary Roberts, Beyula Putungka Napanangka, Watson Corby among others.

=== Papunya Literature Production Centre ===
A Pintupi-Luritja language publisher which operated from Papunya School between 1978 and the 1990s. This production centre created approximately 350 books in language as well as a monthly community newspaper Tjakulpa kuwarritja.

== See also ==
- Contemporary Indigenous Australian art
- Geoffrey Bardon
- Honey Ant Dreaming
