= Kiwirrkurra Community, Western Australia =

Community in Australia

Kiwirrkurra
- Town
- Coordinates: 22°49′00″S 127°45′50″E
- Country: Australia
- State: Western Australia
- LGA: Shire of East Pilbara
- Location: 700 km (430 mi) west of Alice Springs; 1,200 km (750 mi) south east of Port Hedland; 1,200 km (750 mi) east of Newman; 2,135 km (1,327 mi) north east of Perth

Government
  - State electorate: Pilbara
  - Federal division: Durack
- Elevation: 433 m (1,421 ft)

Population
  - Total: 180 (UCL 2021)
- Time zone: UTC+8:00 (AWST)

Kiwirrkurra, gazetted as Kiwirrkurra Community, is a small community in Western Australia in the Gibson Desert, 1,200 kilometres (750 mi) east of Port Hedland and 700 kilometres (430 mi) west of Alice Springs. It had a population of 165 in 2016, mostly Aboriginal Australians. It has been described as the most remote community in Australia.

The main service provider is Ngaanyatjarra Council area, although outside of the boundary of the Ngaanyatjarra Lands.

== History ==
It was established around a bore in the early 1980s as a Pintupi settlement, as part of the outstation movement, and became a permanent community in 1983. It was one of the last areas with nomadic Aboriginal people until about that time, the Pintupi Nine.

It was flooded in early 2000, and further flooding between 3 and 5 March 2001 forced the evacuation of its population of 170, first briefly to Kintore and then for four weeks to NORFORCE's base in Alice Springs and finally to Morapoi Station in the Goldfields of Western Australia, 2,000 kilometres (1,200 mi) SSW of Kiwirrkurra. The stay in Alice Springs and Morapoi brought the community into contact with alcohol for the first time and led to violence and social disruption. By late 2002 the community had moved back to Kiwirrkurra.

On 19 October 2001 the Kiwirrkurra people gained native title over 42,900 square kilometres (16,600 sq mi) of the surrounding land and waters.

On 19 June 2009, a 26-year-old man from Kiwirrkurra was the first Australian to die of the 2009 flu pandemic; he was initially treated in Alice Springs hospital but he died in Royal Adelaide Hospital.

A Perth Catholic boys' school, CBC Fremantle, has established an immersion partnership program with the local Kiwirrkurra community to further Indigenous relations, improve local facilities and further the students' social and pastoral developments. Students and teachers organise trips about once a year.

The Kiwirrkura community worked to establish the Kiwirrkurra Indigenous Protected Area, which was formally launched in September 2014.

On 1 July 2024, the community switched from Australian Central Standard Time (UTC +9:30) to the regular time zone for Western Australia, Australian Western Standard Time (UTC+08:00).

== Location and description ==
The settlement is located in the Gibson Desert in Western Australia, 1,200 kilometres (750 mi) east of Port Hedland and 700 kilometres (430 mi) west of Alice Springs. Although it is situated outside of the Ngaanyatjarra Lands, Kiwirrkurra is affiliated with the Ngaanyatjarra Council. It is one of 11 communities in the council area.

Although situated in a desert, it is in a low-lying area without drainage, and thus prone to flooding.

The residents of the settlement are Pintupi, and speak the Pintupi language, one of several Western Desert languages.

== Naming ==
Although the community name is gazetted as "Kiwirrkurra Community" and this is the usual spelling, a more accurate reflection of the way the Pintupi speaking community members say the name (according to the standard Pintupi orthography) is "Kiwirrkura" and this spelling is used in many printed materials especially technical works dealing with the language.

== Facilities ==
There is a school campus called Kiwirrkurra Campus, with three teachers and 24 students as of 2021. The school teaches Pintupi language and culture. One school principal manages the school along with nine others across the Ngaanyatjarra Lands in the Western Desert region of WA, collectively known as Ngaanyatjarra Lands School.

== Notable people ==
- Takariya Napaltjarri (born c. 1960) – Indigenous artist
- Ningura Napurrula (c. 1938 – 2013) – Indigenous artist
