= Lake Mackay =

Ephemeral salt lake in Western Australia and Northern Territory, Australia

Lake Mackay (Wilkinkarra)
- Wilkinkarra (Pintupi-Luritja)
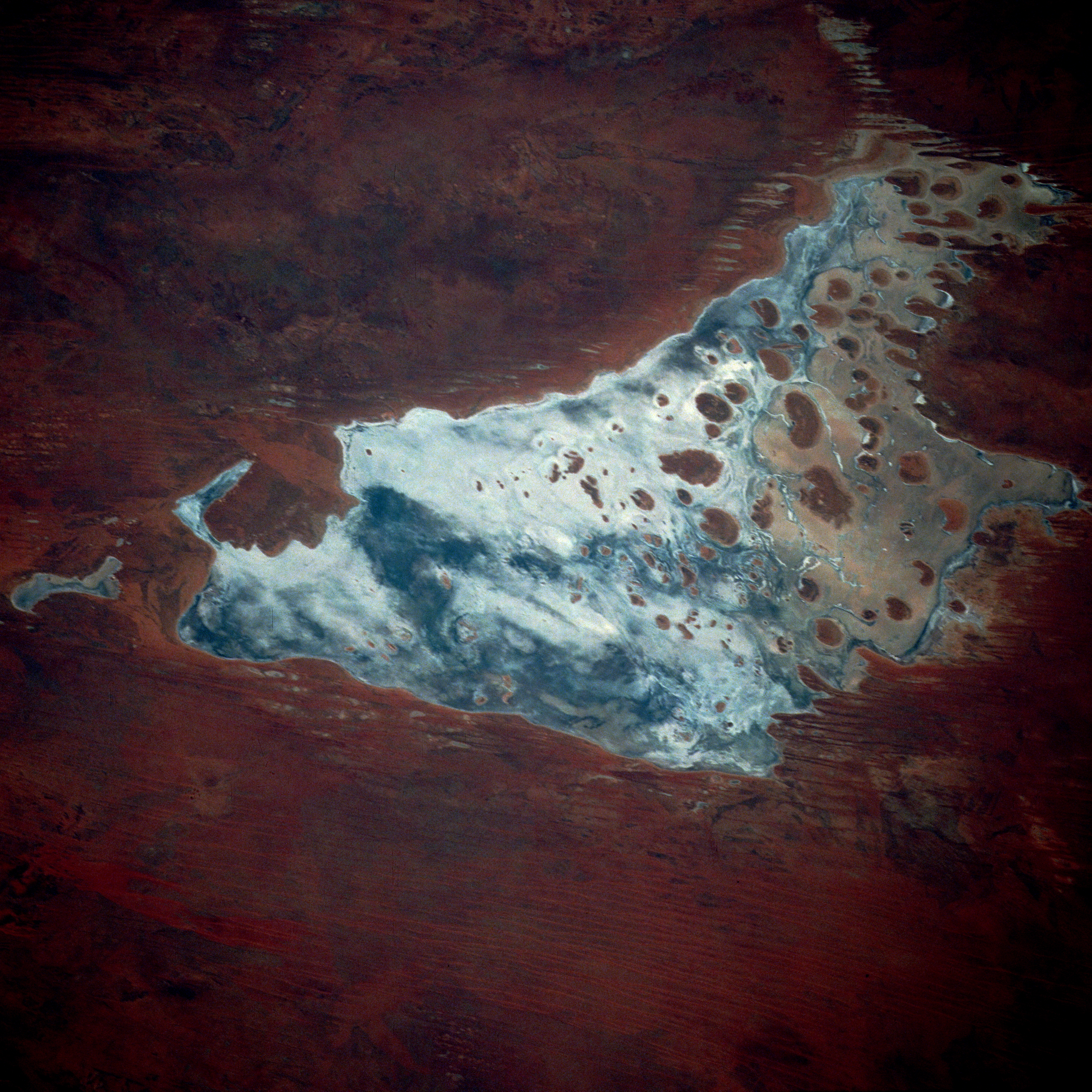
- From space (November 1989)

- Location on the Northern Territory and Western Australian border
- Interactive map of Lake Mackay (Wilkinkarra)
- Location: Western Australia and Northern Territory
- Coordinates: 22°30′S 128°35′E
- Type: Salt lake
- Basin countries: Australia
- Max. length: 100 km (62 mi)
- Max. width: 100 km (62 mi)
- Surface area: 3,494 km^{2} (1,349 sq mi)

Lake Mackay, known as Wilkinkarra to the Indigenous Pintupi people, is the largest of hundreds of ephemeral salt lakes scattered throughout the Pilbara and northern parts of the Goldfields-Esperance region of Western Australia and the Northern Territory. It is located on the edge of the Great Sandy Desert.

The lake is the largest in Western Australia and has a surface area of 3,494 km^{2} (1,349 sq mi). Its elevation ranges between 355 m (1,165 ft) and 370 m (1,210 ft) above mean sea-level.

== Description ==
Lake Mackay is the fourth largest lake in Australia. It measures approximately 100 km (60 mi) east-west and north-south. The darker areas of the lakebed are indicative of some form of desert vegetation or algae, some moisture within the soils of the dry lake, and the lowest elevations where pooling of water occurs. In this arid environment, salts and other minerals are carried to the surface through capillary action caused by evaporation, thereby producing the white reflective surface. Visible are various brown hills scattered across the eastern half of the lake and east-west-oriented sand ridges south of the lake.

== Encounters ==
Explorer David Carnegie in 1897 predicted the lake's existence when he passed by it to the west as quoted in his book Spinifex and Sand.

May 9th we left the well on a Southerly course, and were soon amongst the ridges, which continued for the next two days. The night of the 11th, having skirted a line of rough cliffs, we camped about three miles North of a very prominent single hill, which I named Mount Webb, after W. F. Webb, Esq., of Newstead Abbey, Nottinghamshire. As the sun rose that morning the mirage of a lake of apparently great size was visible for 90° of the horizon — that is, from East round to South. Neither from the cliffs that we skirted, nor from Mount Webb, was any lake visible, but it is more than probable that a large salt lake exists in this locality, possibly connecting, in a broken line, Lake White and Lake Macdonald.

The lake was first charted by Christopher Walker. He and Andy Everett came upon the mid-eastern side on Tuesday 15 April 1913, while on a prospecting expedition west from Ryan's Well to Wiluna.

Looking westward all that I could see was mirage for miles which appeared like large sheets of water. … After leaving the hill & going west for two miles we struck on our right an arm of the lake. At this point the lake was dry & exposed a thin layer of very white salt. … We then followed the arm of the lake westward. In another two miles along the arm it wheeled around to the south. … From this position looking north at what first looked like land on the other side, was only an island in the lake. Going a little further south gave us a better view of the islands. These islands would be distant from near shore from one up to four miles. Looking westward between the islands the lake could plainly be seen for many miles westward. This part of the lake we could not see water only large salt plains, which had the appearance of a large plain after a snow storm.

It was next reported by the 1930 Mackay Aerial Survey Expedition, after the survey aircraft flew over on 5 June 1930. Then Michael Terry and party reached the north-eastern corner of Lake Mackay by camel in August 1932. Terry mentioned two reports which may have been of the same lake, prior to Mackay’s 1930 survey: Afghan cameleer Rawazan in 1904, and the prospector Jimmy Wyckham in 1925.

Lake Mackay was approved as a name both in the Northern Territory and in Western Australia by the Minister for the Interior, Canberra, on 13 March 1934 after Donald George Mackay.

== Events ==
The lake was the birthplace of prominent Indigenous artist Linda Syddick Napaltjarri, and the area in which artist Ronnie Tjampitjinpa grew up.

A report published by ABC News in September 2024 observed that a sulphate of potash mine proposed for Lake Mackay, and supported by local Aboriginal communities, might present environmental challenges to a newly detected population of night parrots, a critically endangered species, in the nearby Ngururrpa Indigenous Protected Area. However, the report also noted that Agrimin, the promoter of the proposed mine, was planning conservation measures including fire management, a control program for Feral cats and Red foxes (but not dingoes), and, perhaps most importantly, a curfew on haulage over the private road that would serve the proposed mine.

== Namesakes ==
The Northern Territory locality of Lake Mackay, whose boundaries include the lake, was named after it in 2007.

Mackay Lacus, one of the lakes on Saturn's moon Titan, is named after Lake Mackay.

== Gallery ==
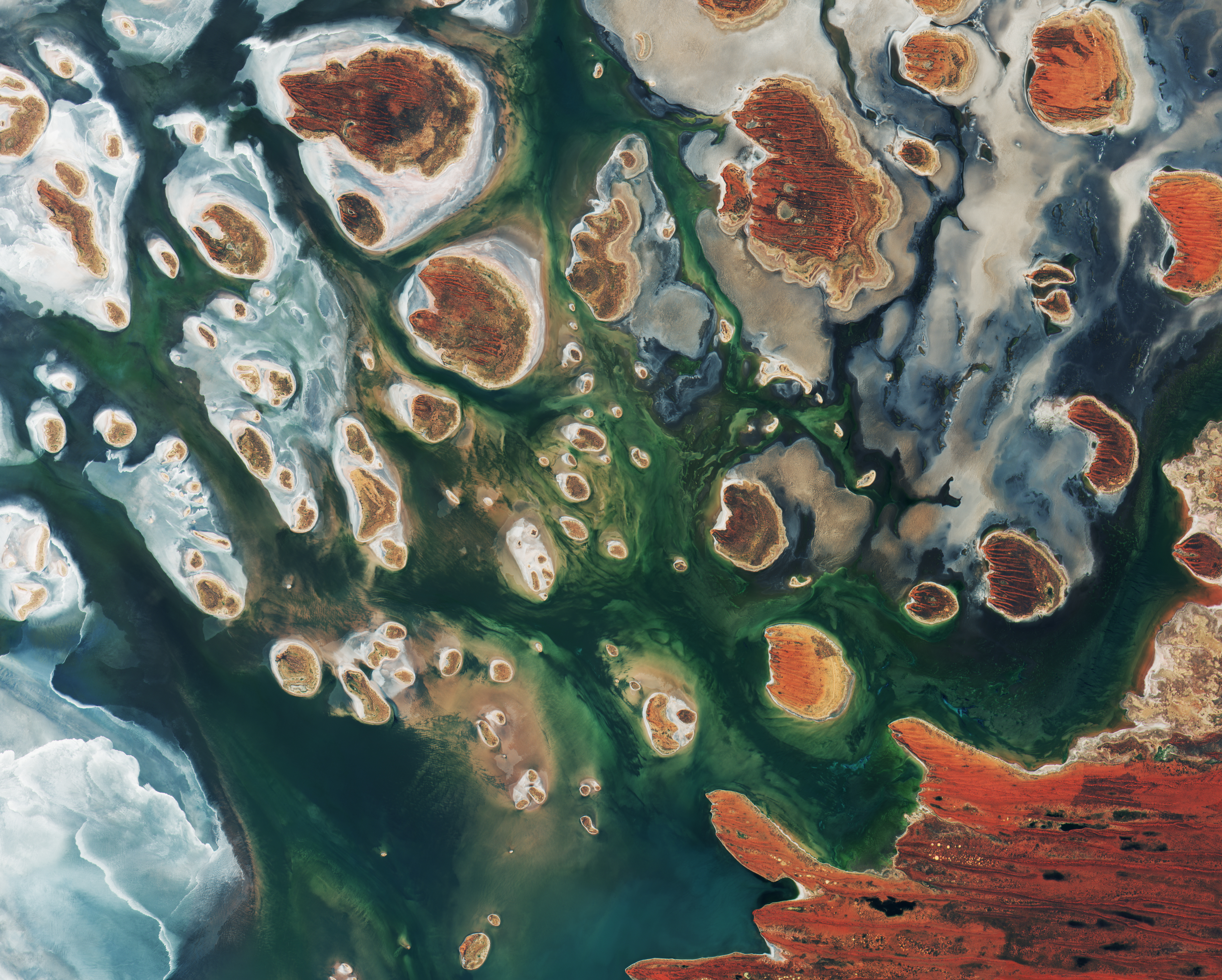
2017 satellite photograph taken by Copernicus Sentinel-2B

== See also ==
- List of lakes of Australia
- Lake Mackay hare-wallaby
