= Burt Plain, Northern Territory =

Burt Plain Northern Territory
- Coordinates: 23°23′21″S 133°28′26″E
- Population: 250 (2016 census)
  - Density: 0.0256/km^{2} (0.0662/sq mi)
- Established: 4 April 2007
- Postcode(s): 0872
- Area: 9,777 km^{2} (3,774.9 sq mi)
- Time zone: ACST (UTC+9:30)
- Location: 1,249 km (776 mi) S of Darwin City
- LGA(s): MacDonnell Region
- Territory electorate(s): Namatjira
- Federal division(s): Lingiari
Mean max temp	Mean min temp	Annual rainfall
28.9 °C; 84 °F	13.3 °C; 56 °F	282.8 mm 11.1 in
Suburbs around Burt Plain:
Anmatjere	Anmatjere	Anmatjere
Mount Zeil; Namatjira	Burt Plain	Hart; Hale
Namatjira	Namatjira; Hugh; White Gums; Ilparpa; Flynn; Larapinta; Irlpme; Undoolya; Hale	Hale
- Footnotes: Adjoining localities

Burt Plain is a locality in the Northern Territory of Australia located about 1,249 kilometres (776 mi) south of the territory capital of Darwin.

The locality consists of the following land (from west to east, then north to south):

1. The Amburla and Yambah pastoral leases
2. The Hamilton Downs and Bond Springs pastoral leases, and
3. part of the West MacDonnell National Park at its eastern end.

The locality’s boundaries and name were gazetted on 4 April 2007. It is named after the natural feature of the same name which itself was named in 1871 after A.G. Burt, a member of the team building the Overland Telegraph Line. As of 2020, it has an area of 9,777 square kilometres (3,775 sq mi).

The 2016 Australian census which was conducted in August 2016 reports that Burt Plain had 250 people living within its boundaries of which 215 (85%) identified as “Aboriginal and/or Torres Strait Islander people.”

Burt Plain is located within the federal division of Lingiari, the territory electoral division of Namatjira and the local government area of the MacDonnell Region.
