= Kunparrka, Northern Territory =

Kunparrka Northern Territory
- Coordinates: 23°17′12″S 132°3′2″E
- Population: 121 (2021 census)
  - Density: 0.02062/km^{2} (0.05341/sq mi)
- Established: 3 April 2007
- Postcode(s): 0872
- Area: 5,867.344 km^{2} (2,265.4 sq mi)
- Time zone: ACST (UTC+9:30)
- Location: 1,210 km (752 mi) S of Darwin City
- LGA(s): MacDonnell Region
- Territory electorate(s): Namatjira
- Federal division(s): Lingiari
| Mean max temp | Mean min temp | Annual rainfall |
| 28.9 °C; 84 °F | 13.3 °C; 56 °F | 282.8 mm 11.1 in |
Suburbs around Kunparrka:
| Lake Mackay | Lake Mackay | Lake Mackay; Mount Zeil |
| Lake Mackay | Kunparrka | Hugh |
| Lake Mackay | Mereenie | Mereenie |
- Footnotes: Adjoining localities

Kunparrka is a locality in the Northern Territory, Australia, located about 1,210 kilometres (750 mi) south of the territory capital of Darwin.

Kunparrka is located within the federal division of Lingiari, the territory electoral division of Namatjira and the local government area of the MacDonnell Region.

== History ==
The locality’s boundaries and name were gazetted on 3 April 2007. It is named after the Kunparrka Aboriginal Land Trust.

== Demographics ==
As of the 2021 Australian census, 121 people resided in Kunparrka, up from 112 in the 2016 census. The median age of persons in Kunparrka was 34 years. There were fewer males than females, with 46% of the population male and 54% female. The average household size was 3.9 people per household.
