= Simpson, Northern Territory =

Simpson Northern Territory
- Coordinates: 24°56′04″S 136°42′00″E
- Population: 1 (2016 census)
  - Density: 00/km^{2} (0/sq mi)
- Established: 4 April 2007
- Postcode(s): 0872
- Area: 50,089 km^{2} (19,339.5 sq mi)
- Time zone: ACST (UTC+9:30)
- Location: 1,427 km (887 mi) SE of Darwin; 360 km (224 mi) SE of Alice Springs
- LGA(s): MacDonnell Shire
- Territory electorate(s): Namatjira
- Federal division(s): Lingiari
Mean max temp	Mean min temp	Annual rainfall
32.0 °C; 90 °F	16.7 °C; 62 °F	199.3 mm 7.8 in
Suburbs around Simpson:
Anatye; Hale	Anatye	Queensland
Hale; Ghan	Simpson	Queensland
South Australia	South Australia	South Australia
- Footnotes: Adjoining localities

Simpson is a locality in the Northern Territory of Australia located about 1,427 kilometres (887 mi) south-east of the territory capital of Darwin and about 360 kilometres (220 mi) south-east of the municipal seat in Alice Springs in the territory's south-east corner adjoining the states of Queensland and South Australia.

The locality consists of the following land (from north to south and then from west to east):

1. Land described as NT Portions 4208, 4918 and 7065
2. The Pmer Ulpere Ingwemirne Arletherre Aboriginal Land Trust and land described as NT Portions 4209 and 4917.

As of 2020, it has an area of 50,089 square kilometres (19,339 sq mi).

The locality's boundaries and name were gazetted on 4 April 2007. Its name is derived from the Simpson Desert which was named in 1929 by C. T. Madigan after Alfred Allen Simpson, who was president of the South Australian Branch of the Royal Geographical Society.

The 2016 Australian census which was conducted in August 2016 reports that Simpson had no people living within its boundaries.

Simpson is located within the federal division of Lingiari, the territory electoral division of Namatjira and the local government area of the MacDonnell Region.
