= Ghan, Northern Territory =

Ghan Northern Territory
- Coordinates: 25°04′01″S 133°56′42″E
- Population: 124 (2016 census)
  - Density: 0.002242/km^{2} (0.005808/sq mi)
- Established: 4 April 2007
- Postcode(s): 0872
- Area: 55,297 km^{2} (21,350.3 sq mi)
- Time zone: ACST (UTC+9:30)
- Location: 1,470 km (913 mi) S of Darwin City
- LGA(s): MacDonnell Region
- Territory electorate(s): Namatjira
- Federal division(s): Lingiari
Mean max temp	Mean min temp	Annual rainfall
28.5 °C; 83 °F	13.8 °C; 57 °F	249.9 mm 9.8 in
Suburbs around Ghan:
Namatjira	Namatjira; Hugh; Hale	Hale
Petermann	Ghan	Hale; Simpson
South Australia	South Australia	South Australia
- Footnotes: Locations; Adjoining localities (Note: The locality of Ghan fully surrounds both the locality of Finke and the community of Imanpa.)

Ghan is a locality in the Northern Territory of Australia located about 1,470 kilometres (910 mi) south of the territory capital of Darwin at the intersection of Lasseter Highway and Stuart Highway.

== Naming ==
The locality’s name is given in "recognition of the important role the Afghans and their camels played in opening up Central Australia." It fully surrounds both the locality of Finke and the community of Imanpa. Its boundaries and name were gazetted on 4 April 2007.

== Landmarks and heritage listed sites ==
Perhaps the most notable landmark in Ghan is the Lambert Centre of Australia, a point that marks the geographical centre of Australia. It is marked by a flagpole that mimics that of Parliament House, Canberra. Ghan includes the following places that have been listed on the Northern Territory Heritage Register – the Charlotte Waters Telegraph Station, the Henbury Meteorite Craters, the Illamurta Springs Conservation Reserve, the Mac Clark (Acacia peuce) Conservation Reserve and the Old Andado Station.

== Governance ==
Ghan is located within the federal division of Lingiari, the territory electoral division of Namatjira and the local government area of the MacDonnell Region.

== Demographics ==
The 2016 Australian census which was conducted in August 2016 reports that Ghan had 124 people living within its boundaries.
