= Longitude 131° =

Luxury Australian resort

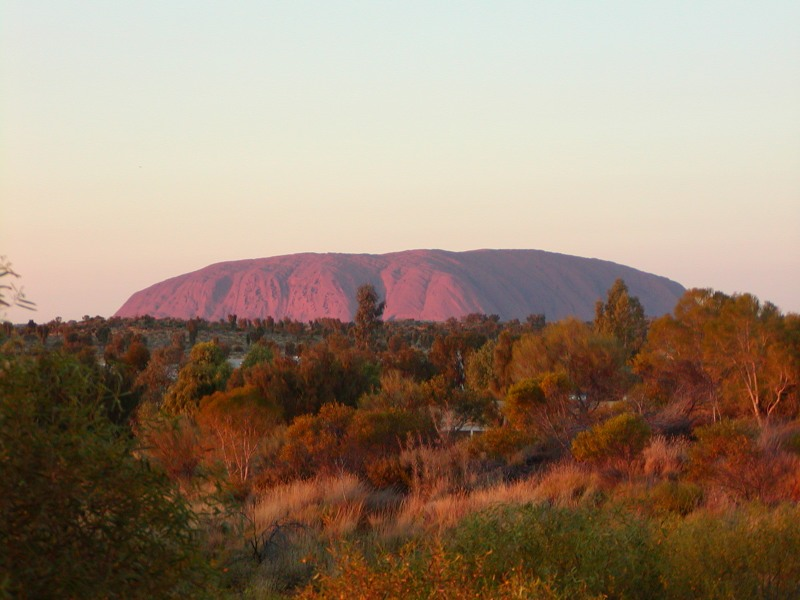
- The view of Uluru is a key attraction of Longitude 131°
- Interactive map of the Longitude 131° area
- Etymology: 131st meridian east
- Hotel chain: Baillie Lodges

General information
- Architectural style: Floating tents
- Location: Uluṟu-Kata Tjuṯa National Park, Yulara, Northern Territory, Australia
- Coordinates: 25°14′59″S 131°00′30″E
- Opened: June 2002
- Renovated: 2017
- Affiliation: Luxury Lodges of Australia; Unique Lodges of the World

Technical details
- Grounds: 23,800 square metres (256,000 sq ft)

Design and construction
- Architect: Philip Cox
- Architecture firm: Cox Architecture
- Main contractor: Bovis Lend Lease

Other information
- Number of rooms: 15 luxury tents, each with their own private view of Uluṟu
- Number of restaurants: 1
- Number of bars: 1
- Facilities: Swimming pool

Website
- longitude131.com.au

Longitude 131° is a luxury resort located just outside the UNESCO World Heritage-listed Uluṟu-Kata Tjuṯa National Park, within 10 kilometres (6.2 mi) direct line of sight to Uluṟu, and a short driving distance of Yulara, in the Northern Territory, Australia.

Longitude 131° consists of 15 guest suites (tents) and the main communal Dune House which houses the lodges restaurant, bar, library, lounge areas and boutique and is designed in a tent-style with uninterrupted views of Uluṟu. It takes its name from its location on longitude 131°. Due to its remote location, Longitude 131° provides transfers to connect with all Ayers Rock Airport flights. Road access is via Yulara, located a short distance away; however, access to the resort is restricted to resort vehicles. Opened in June 2002 as part of Voyages Hotels & Resorts, Longitude 131° was acquired in 2013 by Baillie Lodges and is affiliated with the Luxury Lodges of Australia and Unique Lodges of the World.

== 2003 bushfires ==
The resort opened in 2002 and was devastated the following year by the 2003 bush fires. Fire damaged most of the tents as well as the resort clubhouse. The resort was extensively rebuilt and reopened. The new buildings used prefabricated structures and light-weight machinery which minimised impact on the delicate ecology; at the time, in a vital stage of regeneration.

== Awards ==
The resorts unique location and design has won it a number of awards including the 2013 Trip Advisor Travellers’ Choice, the 2011 American Express Centurion Magazine Reader’s Choice Awards for Top Eco Friendly Resort and 2010 Travel+Leisure World’s Best Hotels Top 500, Australia & South Pacific Region.

== See also ==
- Yulara, Northern Territory
