= Areyonga, Northern Territory =

Areyonga Northern Territory
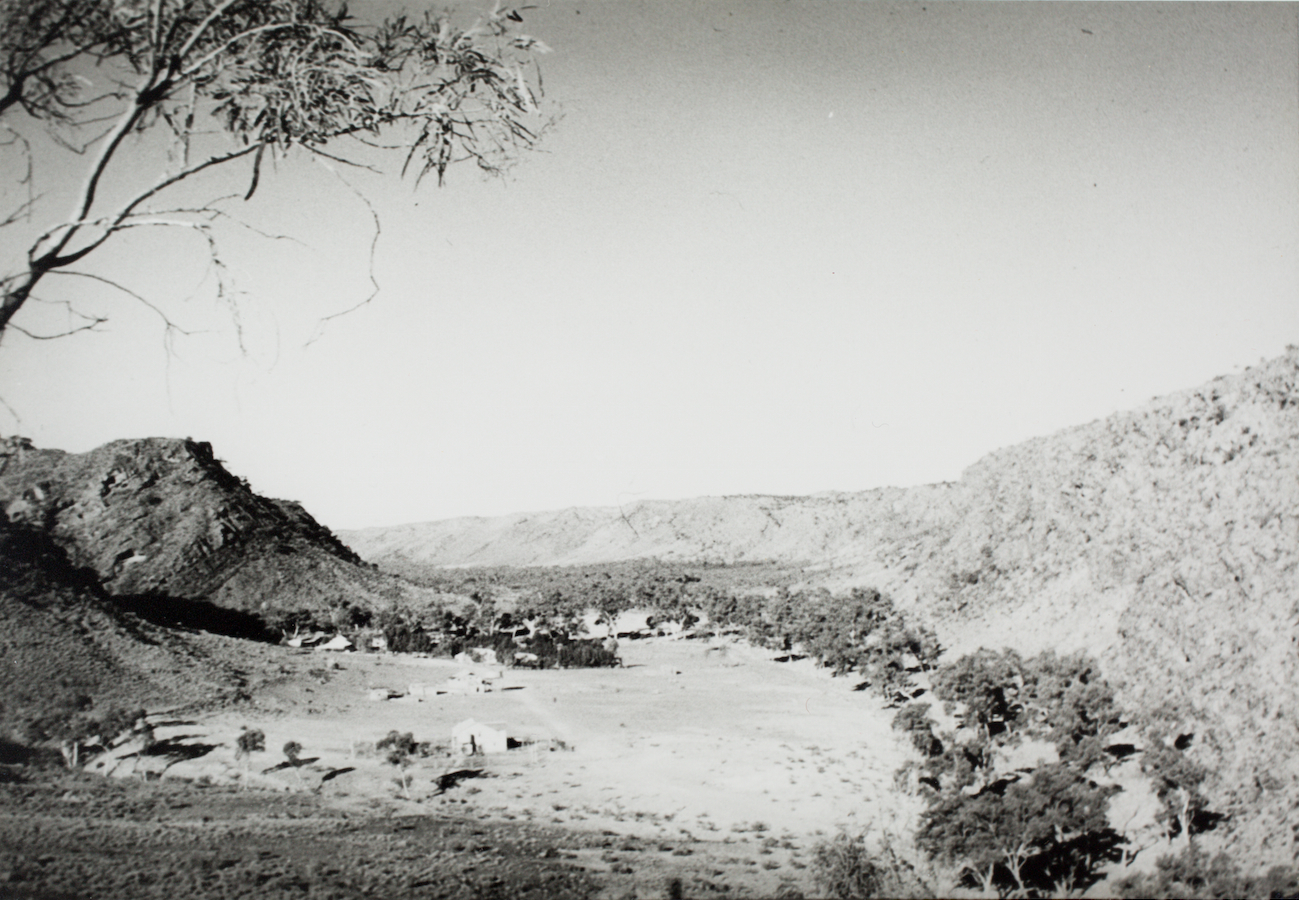
- Areyonga settlement in the Northern Territory of Australia (circa 1958)

- Coordinates: 24°05′14″S 132°16′19″E
- Population: 236 (2021 census)
- Established: 1920s
- Postcode(s): 0872
- Time zone: ACST (UTC+9:30)
- Location: 1,299 km (807 mi) S of Darwin; 220 km (137 mi) W of Alice Springs
- LGA(s): MacDonnell Region
- Territory electorate(s): Gwoja
- Federal division(s): Lingiari
Suburbs around Areyonga:
Mereenie	Mereenie	Namatjira
Mereenie	Areyonga	Namatjira
Mereenie	Mereenie	Namatjira
- Footnotes: Adjoining localities

Areyonga (Pitjantjatjara: Utju) is a small town in the Northern Territory of Australia, located about 220 km (140 mi) west of Alice Springs. Founded in the 1920s, it had a population of about 236 in the 2021 Australian census, most of whom are Aboriginal people of the Pitjantjatjara language group.

Areyonga School was one of the earliest adopters of "two-way education", which celebrated its 50th anniversary in June 2023.

== History ==
Areyonga was founded during the 1920s. A long drought forced Pitjantatjara families to leave Kaḻṯukatjara and other places in the Petermann Ranges. They originally moved to Hermannsburg and then set up a new community at Areyonga. A Lutheran mission was established in the settlement in the 1940s. In the 1970s, many people from the mission moved back to the community at Kaḻṯukatjara. The Lutheran mission at Areyonga was closed in 1990, and the land was given back to the native people as part of the Haasts Bluff Aboriginal Land Trust. The term "Finke River Mission" was initially an alternative name for the mission at Hermannsburg, but this name was later often used to include the settlements at Haasts Bluff, Areyonga and, later, Papunya. It now refers to all Lutheran missionary activity in Central Australia since the first mission was established at Hermannsburg in 1877.

In the 1950s and 60s, many of the local women worked as domestic servants for white families, and the men in orchards and public utilities. The children were put in uniforms and taken to school by white people, and afterwards taken back to camp. Through the 1970s to 1980s, a number of models of self-governing councils were trialled.

== Location, geography and access ==
Areyonga is located about 220 km (140 mi) west of Alice Springs. It lies in a valley at the western end of the MacDonnell Ranges at the base of a deep and spectacular gorge.

It has abundant flora and fauna along its creek bed and waterholes, including a large feral donkey population. It is a 20 km (12 mi) detour from the Mereenie Loop for visitors coming through from Kings Canyon.

No permit is required to visit.

== Governance ==
The town is governed by Areyonga Aboriginal Community.

Areyonga is located within the federal division of Lingiari, the territory electoral division of Gwoja and the local government area of the MacDonnell Region.

== Demographics ==
In the 2021 Australian census, the population was reported as 236, which was a rise from the 2016 Australian census, which recorded 195. In 2021, of which 176 (89.4%) identified as Aboriginal and/or Torres Strait Islander people (mostly Pitjantjatjara, with 80.9% using Pitjantjatjara language at home). The majority (62.7%) identified their religion as Lutheran.

The community's ABS classification is "Very Remote".

== Facilities ==
Areyonga has a general store, community hall, and sporting facilities, including an Aussie rules football oval, and basketball court. The local football team, Areyonga Desert Tigers, travels up to 1,600 km (990 mi) to play opponents at places such as Docker River.

== Education ==
Areyonga School provides education from primary through to middle school. As of August 2021, there were 37 students enrolled at the school, and as of 2023 the head is Toby Brown.

In 1973 Areyonga School was one of five schools in which the Northern Territory Government ran a pilot program in five schools offering bilingual education, with lessons taught in Pitjantjatjara language as well as English. This has continued through to the present day, celebrating 50 years in June 2023. Culture is taught as well as language, in a model known as " two-way" or "both ways" education. Local assistant teacher Djala Andrews, who died in 2018, is credited with getting the program running, while David Raff was principal in the early days. Tarna Andrews, Djala's partner, is still teaching at the school, nearly 40 years after starting there, and Christine Bennett and Lucinda Nipper are assistant teachers. For the 50-year celebration, past principals, teacher linguists, and other staff members travelled to the school to join the inma and other activities.

The school is also participating in CSIRO's "Science Pathways for Indigenous Communities Indigenous STEM Education Project", through the Tangentyere Council. In this program, known as "Two-way Science", Aboriginal ecological knowledge is taught through outdoor and classroom projects.

In 1985, the school had a mural painted by a local artist called "Kaipipi Bob". During the 1980s, artists and writers in the Pitjantjatjara language worked with the teachers at the school, and Indigenous stories, activities, and imagery featured in classroom materials and books. The curriculum included knowledge and stories about practical matters such as plants and seasons, as well as using the store and the clinic. Visual literacy is important in Indigenous culture, as they "read" their environment.

== People ==
Pitjantjatjara artist Bill Whiskey Tjapaltjarri lived at the mission for some time in his younger days in the mid-20th century, working as a labourer, clearing land, building, mustering, and cooking, for which he was paid in rations. He married Colleen Nampitjinpa at Areyonga.

Another artist, Christine Brumby, was born in Areyonga in 1965, before moving to Docker River and later to Mutitjulu, near Uluru. She was one of four senior women artists from Maruku Arts & Crafts who decorated the canvas version of the Uluru Statement from the Heart in 2017.
