= Hugh, Northern Territory =

Hugh Northern Territory
- Coordinates: 24°20′S 133°37′E
- Population: 865 (2016 census)
  - Density: 0.09041/km^{2} (0.23415/sq mi)
- Established: 4 April 2007
- Postcode(s): 0872
- Area: 9,568 km^{2} (3,694.2 sq mi)
- Time zone: ACST (UTC+9:30)
- Location: 1,328 km (825 mi) S of Darwin City
- LGA(s): MacDonnell Region
- Territory electorate(s): Namatjira
- Federal division(s): Lingiari
Mean max temp	Mean min temp	Annual rainfall
28.9 °C; 84 °F	13.3 °C; 56 °F	282.8 mm 11.1 in
Suburbs around Hugh:
Burt Plain	Burt Plain	Burt Plain; White Gums; Arumbera
Burt Plain; Namatjira; Ghan	Hugh	Connellan; Hale; Ghan
Ghan	Ghan	Ghan
- Footnotes: Adjoining localities

Hugh is a locality in the Northern Territory, Australia, located about 1,328 kilometres (825 mi) south of the territory capital of Darwin.

The locality consists of the following land from north to south – the Owen Springs, the Orange Creek and the Maryvale pastoral leases.

The locality’s boundaries and name were gazetted on 4 April 2007. It is named after the river which flows through the locality and which was named as a creek by John McDouall Stuart in 1860 after a Hugh Chambers. It fully surrounds the community of Titjikala. As of 2020, it has an area of 9,568 square kilometres (3,694 sq mi).

The 2016 Australian census which was conducted in August 2016 reports that Hugh had 865 people living within its boundaries of which 687 (78.9%) identified as “Aboriginal and/or Torres Strait Islander people.”

Hugh is located within the federal division of Lingiari, the territory electoral division of Namatjira and the local government area of the MacDonnell Region.
