= Petermann, Northern Territory =

Suburb of MacDonnell Region, the Northern Territory (NT), Australia

Petermann
- Suburb
- Coordinates: 25°04′01″S 130°49′30″E
- Country: Australia
- State: Northern Territory
- LGA: MacDonnell Region
- Location: 1,427 km (887 mi) S of Darwin
- Established: 4 April 2007

Government
  - Territory electorate: Namatjira
  - Federal division: Lingiari

Area
  - Total: 69,666 km^{2} (26,898 sq mi)
- Elevation (Yulara airport): 492 m (1,614 ft)

Population
  - Total: 185 (2016 census)
  - Density: 0.002656/km^{2} (0.006878/sq mi)
- Time zone: UTC+9:30 (ACST)
- Postcode: 0872
- Mean max temp: 30.2 °C (86.4 °F)
- Mean min temp: 14.1 °C (57.4 °F)
- Annual rainfall: 273.8 mm (10.78 in)
Suburbs around Petermann
Western Australia	Lake Mackay; Mereenie; Namatjira	Namatjira
Western Australia	Petermann	Ghan
Western Australia	South Australia	South Australia

Petermann is a locality in the Northern Territory of Australia located about 1,427 kilometres (887 mi) south of the territory capital of Darwin in the territory’s south-western corner adjoining the states of South Australia and Western Australia.

The locality consists of the following land (from west to east) – the Petermann Aboriginal Land Trust, the Katiti Aboriginal Land Trust and the NT Portion 1798 (better known as the Uluru-Kata Tjuta National Park), the Land Settlement Aboriginal Corporation and NT Portion 6665 (better known as the Watarrka National Park), the Urrampinyi Iltjiltjarri Aboriginal Land Trust and the pastoral leases of Curtin Springs, Angas Downs and Mulga Park. The locality fully surrounds the communities of Kaltukatjara and Mutitjulu, and the locality of Yulara.

Petermann is named after the Petermann Ranges, a mountain range partly located within the locality’s boundaries, and which was named after the German cartographer, August Heinrich Petermann by the explorer, Ernest Giles, in 1874. The locality’s boundary and name were gazetted on 4 April 2007.

The 2016 Australian census which was conducted in August 2016 reports that Petermann had 185 people living within its boundaries.

Petermann is located within the federal division of Lingiari, the territory electoral division of Namatjira and the local government area of the MacDonnell Region.
