= Nyirripi, Northern Territory =

Nyirripi Northern Territory
- Coordinates: 22°38′51″S 130°32′58″E
- Population: 251 (2021)
- Postcode(s): 0872
- LGA(s): Central Desert Region
- Territory electorate(s): Stuart
- Federal division(s): Lingiari
Localities around Nyirripi:
Lake Mackay	Lake Mackay	Lake Mackay
Lake Mackay	Nyirripi	Lake Mackay
Lake Mackay	Lake Mackay	Lake Mackay
- Footnotes: Adjoining localities (Note: The locality of Nyirripi is fully surrounded by the locality of Lake Mackay.)

Nyirripi is a community in the Southern Tanami Ward of the Central Desert Region in the Northern Territory of Australia. The town is approximately 440 kilometres from Alice Springs, with the drive taking 5 to 6 hours. As of 2021, the town's population was 251 people.

== History ==
Nyirripi was first established in the late 1970s, when several families including Tiger Japaljari Morris, Charlie Jampinjinpas, Molly Napurula Martins, Phylis Napurula, Leo Japurula and others decided to leave the pressures of the growing population of Yuendumu. Two men (Edwin and George) were sent into town to secure a pastor for the outstation and Pastor John Henwood returned with them to take up ministry. The community was officially recognised as an outstation after the former Federal Minister for Aboriginal Affairs was pressed in a public forum by community members to define the population numbers that would constitute an outstation. This enabled the securing of much needed funds for infrastructure.

Later the community was recognised as a major community and campaigned for resources, which led to the construction of a school. In 1985, the community became incorporated under the Aboriginal Council Association Act.

== Description ==
Nyirripi is located close to the southern and south western extent of traditionally owned Warlpiri land on the Yunkanjini Aboriginal Land Trust between Newhaven and Mount Doreen Pastoral Properties. Although still predominantly a Warlpiri-speaking community, there are a number of Luritja/Kukatja speakers.

== Governance ==
The Nyirripi Community Government Council is the local governing body and has 13 members who are elected annually. The Local Government Shire is the Central Desert Shire, Southern Tanami Ward.

== Infrastructure and Community Life ==
The community has:

- Community Hall
- Pensioner Units
- BRACS (radio)
- Community Owned Store – Pre-packed and fresh food is available as well as clothing, pharmaceuticals, hardware, white goods, blankets, furnishing and sporting goods.
- Council office
- United Pentecostal Church
- Workshop
- Health Centre
- School
- Meals-on-wheels
- Airstrip
- Morgue
- Power station
- 2 ablution blocks
- Flat for visitors
- Public phones
- Sports oval
