= Namatjira, Northern Territory =

Namatjira Northern Territory
- Coordinates: 23°52′41″S 132°34′59″E
- Population: 164 (2021 census)
  - Density: 0.03791/km^{2} (0.09819/sq mi)
- Established: 3 April 2007
- Postcode(s): 0872
- Area: 4,325.736 km^{2} (1,670.2 sq mi)
- Time zone: ACST (UTC+9:30)
- Location: 1,282.5 km (797 mi) S of Darwin City
- LGA(s): MacDonnell Region
- Territory electorate(s): Namatjira
- Federal division(s): Lingiari
Mean max temp	Mean min temp	Annual rainfall
28.9 °C; 84 °F	13.3 °C; 56 °F	282.8 mm 11.1 in
Suburbs around Namatjira:
Mount Zeil	Mount Zeil	Burt Plain; Hugh
Mereenie	Namatjira	Hugh
Petermann	Ghan	Ghan
- Footnotes: Adjoining localities

Namatjira is a locality in the Northern Territory of Australia, located about 1,282.5 kilometres (796.9 mi) south of the territory capital of Darwin.

Namatjira is located within the federal division of Lingiari, the territory electoral division of Namatjira and the local government area of the MacDonnell Region.

== History ==
The locality’s boundaries and name were gazetted on 3 April 2007. It is named after the Arrente painter Albert Namatjira. As of 2020, it has an area of 4,325.736 square kilometres (1,670.176 sq mi).

== Demographics ==
As of the 2021 Australian census, 164 people resided in Namatjira, down from 175 in the 2016 census. The median age of persons in Namatjira was 29 years. There were fewer males than females, with 45.5% of the population male and 54.5% female. The average household size was 3.6 people per household.
