= Kintore, Northern Territory =

Kintore Walungurru
- Town
- Coordinates: 23°16′25″S 129°22′55″E
- Country: Australia
- State: Northern Territory
- LGA: MacDonnell Region
- Location: 1,212 km (753 mi) S of Darwin; 458 km (285 mi) W of Alice Springs
- Established: 1981

Government
  - Territory electorate: Namatjira
  - Federal division: Lingiari

Area
  - Total: 8.2 km^{2} (3.2 sq mi)
- Elevation (weather station): 454 m (1,490 ft)

Population
  - Total: 410 (2016 census)
  - Density: 50.0/km^{2} (129.5/sq mi)
- Time zone: UTC+9:30 (ACST)
- Postcode: 0872
- Mean max temp: 32.8 °C (91.0 °F)
- Mean min temp: 19.4 °C (66.9 °F)
- Annual rainfall: 279.5 mm (11.00 in)
Localities around Kintore; Walungurru
Lake Mackay	Lake Mackay	Lake Mackay
Lake Mackay	Kintore; Walungurru	Lake Mackay
Lake Mackay	Lake Mackay	Lake Mackay
- Locations; Adjoining localities (Note: The locality of Kintore is fully surrounded by the locality of Lake Mackay.)

Kintore (Pintupi: Walungurru) is a remote settlement in the Kintore Range of the Northern Territory of Australia about 530 km (330 mi) west of Alice Springs and 40 km (25 mi) from the border with Western Australia. It is also known as Walungurru, Walangkura, and Walangura.

== History ==
The Kintore Range was named by William Tietkens during his expedition of 1889 after the Governor of South Australia, Algernon Keith-Falconer, 9th Earl of Kintore.

In 1979 and 1980 satisfactory water was found in four bores sunk at and near the Kintore Range. In mid-1981 an outstation (homeland) was established there and developed as a resource centre for camps elsewhere in the region, allowing the reoccupation of at least some of the Pintupi country. The community was founded in 1981, when many Pintupi people who lived in the community of Papunya (about 240 km (150 mi) from Alice Springs) became unhappy with their circumstances in what they saw as foreign country, and decided to move back to their own country, from which they had been forcibly removed decades earlier due to weapons testing from Woomera in South Australia, as part of the outstation movement.

== Demographics ==
At the 2016 census, Kintore had a population of 410, of which 376 (91.9 per cent) identified themselves as Aboriginal Australians.

The main languages spoken are Pintupi and Luritja. In Pintupi, the majority language of the community, Kintore is known as Walungurru (pronounced [ˈwɐɭʊŋʊɾʊ]).

== Governance ==
Kintore is overseen by the MacDonnell Regional Council, based in Alice Springs.

The town is in the territory electorate of Gwoja and the federal electorate of Lingiari.

== Facilities ==
The community has a Northern Territory Government-funded primary school, an independent store trading as Puli Kutjarra (meaning Two Rocks/mountains in the Pintupi language), an airstrip, an independent health clinic called Pintupi Homelands Health Service, a women's centre called Ngintaka Women's Centre, haemodialysis at The Purple House run by Western Desert Dialysis, and a high school run by Yirara College.

The local Australian rules football team is the Kintore Hawks.

== Art centre ==
There is an arts centre run by Papunya Tula Artists Pty Ltd.

Kintore is a major centre for the Western Desert art movement which began at the community of Papunya. These people traditionally passed on significant Dreamtime stories by way of art using sand, rock and local plants. Nowadays such paintings are done on canvas and have gained worldwide popularity. A number of members of the famous Aboriginal art company Papunya Tula] live at Kintore, among them the deceased artist Ningura Napurrula.

== In popular culture ==
Kintore is mentioned in the Midnight Oil song "Beds are Burning": "Four wheels scare the cockatoos/From Kintore east to Yuendumu".

British novelist and travel writer Bruce Chatwin stayed in Kintore for a two-week period, starting 18 March 1984, while researching his book The Songlines. The village plays a central role in the story, referred to in the book as "Cullen".

== Climate ==
Climate data for Kintore (Walungurru Airport), elevation 454 m (1,490 ft), (2001–2024 normals and extremes)
Month	Jan	Feb	Mar	Apr	May	Jun	Jul	Aug	Sep	Oct	Nov	Dec	Year
Record high °C (°F)	47.4 (117.3)	46.4 (115.5)	45.1 (113.2)	41.1 (106.0)	34.9 (94.8)	32.8 (91.0)	32.3 (90.1)	37.5 (99.5)	39.0 (102.2)	43.0 (109.4)	45.3 (113.5)	47.7 (117.9)	47.7 (117.9)
Mean daily maximum °C (°F)	39.4 (102.9)	38.8 (101.8)	36.7 (98.1)	33.0 (91.4)	27.2 (81.0)	23.3 (73.9)	23.9 (75.0)	26.8 (80.2)	31.8 (89.2)	35.8 (96.4)	37.3 (99.1)	38.5 (101.3)	32.7 (90.9)
Mean daily minimum °C (°F)	26.3 (79.3)	25.9 (78.6)	24.5 (76.1)	20.5 (68.9)	15.3 (59.5)	11.2 (52.2)	10.8 (51.4)	12.6 (54.7)	16.9 (62.4)	20.9 (69.6)	23.1 (73.6)	25.1 (77.2)	19.4 (66.9)
Record low °C (°F)	16.1 (61.0)	18.0 (64.4)	13.7 (56.7)	11.6 (52.9)	6.2 (43.2)	2.4 (36.3)	3.1 (37.6)	3.3 (37.9)	8.3 (46.9)	8.9 (48.0)	10.4 (50.7)	14.3 (57.7)	2.4 (36.3)
Average rainfall mm (inches)	54.0 (2.13)	31.2 (1.23)	45.2 (1.78)	13.1 (0.52)	15.4 (0.61)	13.1 (0.52)	9.9 (0.39)	4.7 (0.19)	6.7 (0.26)	14.0 (0.55)	24.1 (0.95)	54.9 (2.16)	289.1 (11.38)
Average rainy days (≥ 1.0 mm)	5.3	3.0	3.5	0.9	1.3	1.2	1.0	0.5	0.8	1.7	3.3	4.7	27.2
Source: Australian Bureau of Meteorology
