= Mount Zeil, Northern Territory =

Mount Zeil
- Suburb
- Coordinates: 23°16′56″S 132°21′43″E
- Country: Australia
- State: Northern Territory
- LGA: MacDonnell Region
- Location: 1,248 km (775 mi) S of Darwin City
- Established: 4 April 2007

Government
  - Territory electorate: Stuart
  - Federal division: Lingiari

Area
  - Total: 6,692 km^{2} (2,584 sq mi)

Population
  - Total: 83 (2016 census)
  - Density: 0.01240/km^{2} (0.03212/sq mi)
- Time zone: UTC+9:30 (ACST)
- Postcode: 0872
- Mean max temp: 28.9 °C (84.0 °F)
- Mean min temp: 13.3 °C (55.9 °F)
- Annual rainfall: 282.8 mm (11.13 in)
Suburbs around Mount Zeil
Lake Mackay	Lake Mackay; Anmatjere	Anmatjere
Kunparrka; Mereenie	Mount Zeil	Burt Plain
Mereenie	Mereenie; Namatjira	Burt Plain

Mount Zeil is a locality in the Northern Territory of Australia located about 1,248 kilometres (775 mi) south of the territory capital of Darwin.

The locality consists of the following land:

1. The Derwent pastoral lease in the north-west
2. The Narwietooma pastoral lease in the north-east
3. The Glen Helen pastoral lease in the south-west, and
4. The north-west part of the West MacDonnell National Park in the south-east.

The locality’s boundaries and name were gazetted on 4 April 2007. It is named after the mountain of the same name which is located within its boundaries. As of 2020, it has an area of 6,692 square kilometres (2,584 sq mi).

The 2016 Australian census which was conducted in August 2016 reports that Mount Zeil had 83 people living within its boundaries.

Mount Zeil is located within the federal division of Lingiari, the territory electoral division of Stuart and the local government area of the MacDonnell Region.

== Unidentified aerial phenomena ==
On an episode of The Joe Rogan Experience, Harold E. Puthoff referred to a CIA program called the Stargate Project, that identified Mount Zeil as the location of a "secret alien base".

Mount Zeil is in the same region as Pine Gap, a joint defence space research facility. The station is jointly run by the Australian Signals Directorate, the US Central Intelligence Agency, the US National Security Agency, and the US National Reconnaissance Office.

Wycliffe Well, abandoned UFO tourist attraction, is also in this region.
