= Uluṟu-Kata Tjuṯa National Park =

Protected area in the Northern Territory, Australia

- IUCN category II (national park)
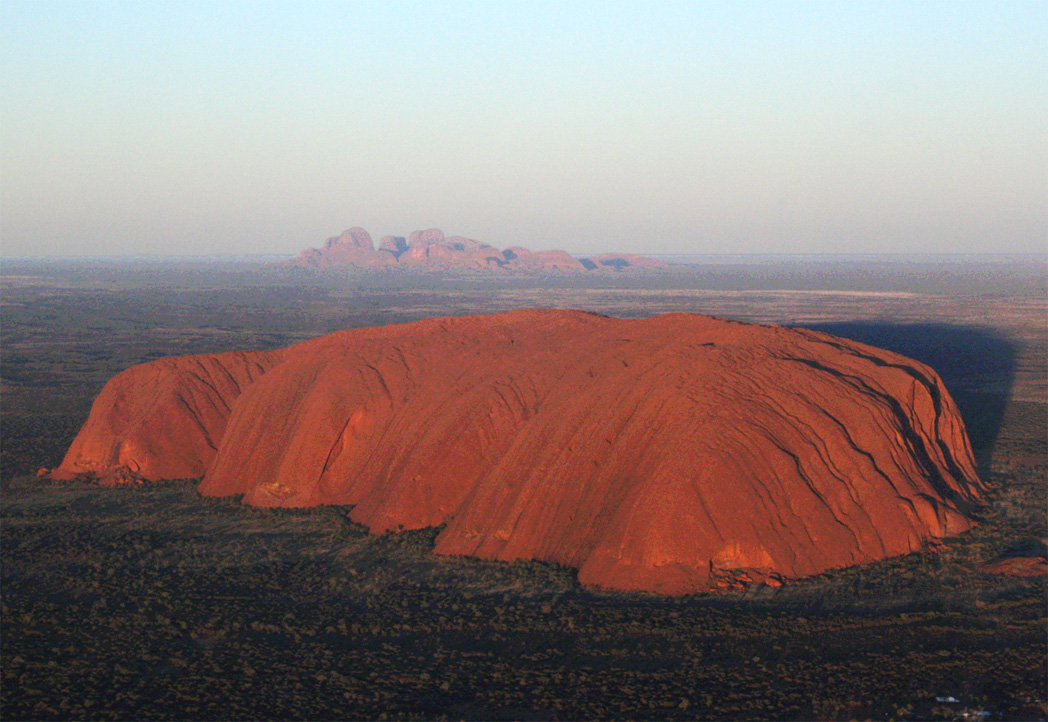
- Uluru (close) and Kata Tjuta (far)

- Location within Northern Territory
- Location: Northern Territory, Petermann
- Nearest city: Yulara
- Coordinates: 25°18′44″S 131°01′07″E
- Area: 1,333.72 km^{2} (514.95 sq mi)
- Established: 23 January 1958
- Governing body: Director of National Parks; Aboriginal traditional land owners (the Anangu people)
- Website: Official website

UNESCO World Heritage Site
- Criteria: Cultural: v, vi; Natural: vii, viii
- Reference: 447
- Inscription: 1987 (11th Session)
- Extensions: 1994

Uluṟu-Kata Tjuṯa National Park is a protected area in the Northern Territory of Australia. The park is home to both Uluru and Kata Tjuta. It is located 1,943 kilometres (1,207 mi) south of Darwin by road and 440 kilometres (270 mi) south-west of Alice Springs along the Stuart and Lasseter Highways. The Outback Highway linking Western Australia and Queensland, and being developed as Australia's third east-west transcontinental route, shares the main road through the park.

The park covers 1,326 square kilometres (512 sq mi) and includes the features it is named after: Uluru and, 40 kilometres (25 mi) to its west, Kata Tjuta. The location is listed as a UNESCO World Heritage Site for natural and cultural landscape in 1987.

== Overview ==
Uluru / Ayers Rock is considered one of Australia's most recognisable landmarks, and has become a focal point for Australia and the world's acknowledgement of Australian indigenous culture. The sandstone monolith stands 348 metres (1,142 ft) high with most of its bulk below the ground. To Anangu, the local indigenous people, Uluru / Ayers Rock is a place name and this "Rock" has a number of different landmarks where many ancestral beings have interacted with the landscape and/or each other, some even believed to still reside here. Kata Tjuta / Mount Olga, meaning 'many heads' in his aboriginal name, is a sacred place relating to knowledge that is considered very powerful and dangerous, only suitable for initiated men. It is made up of a group of 36 conglomerate rock domes that date back 500 million years.

Anangu are the traditional Aboriginal owners of Uluru-Kata Tjuta National Park. They believe that their culture was created at the beginning of time by ancestral beings. Uluru / Ayers Rock and Kata Tjuta / Mount Olga provide physical evidence of feats performed during the creation period. They often lead walking tours to inform visitors about the local flora and fauna, bush foods and the Aboriginal Dreamtime stories of the area.

The Aboriginal Land Rights (Northern Territory) Act was passed in 1976, meaning that after many years Aboriginal law and land rights were finally recognised in Australian law. Nine years later on 26 October 1985 the traditional owners were presented with the freehold title deeds for the park, who, in turn, leased the land back to the Australian Government through the Director of National Parks (formerly the Australian National Parks and Wildlife Service) for 99 years.

The Director is assisted by Parks Australia, a division of the Australian Department of the Environment and Energy. Since hand-back, Anangu and Parks Australia staff have worked together to manage the park. This process of working together is known as 'joint management'.

== History ==
Uluru and Kata Tjuta were formed about 350 million years ago during the Alice Springs Orogeny.

The Anangu have connected to the area for thousands of years and some records suggested that they may have lived there for more than 10,000 years.

Europeans came to the western desert area of Australia in the 1870s. Uluru and Kata Tjuta were first mapped by Europeans during the expeditionary period made possible by the construction of the Overland Telegraph Line in 1872.

In separate expeditions, William Ernest Powell Giles and William Christie Gosse were the first European explorers to this area. In 1872 while exploring the area, Ernest Giles sighted Kata Tjuta from near Kings Canyon and called it Mount Olga, while the following year Gosse saw Uluru and named it Ayers Rock after Sir Henry Ayers, the Chief Secretary of South Australia. Further explorations followed with the aim of establishing the possibilities of the area for pastoralism.

In the late 19th century, pastoralists attempted to re-establish themselves in areas adjoining the South-Western/Petermann Reserve and interaction between Anangu and white people became more frequent and more violent. Due to the effects of grazing and droughts, bush food stores were depleted. Competition for these resources created conflict between pastoralists and Anangu. As a result, police patrols became more frequent.

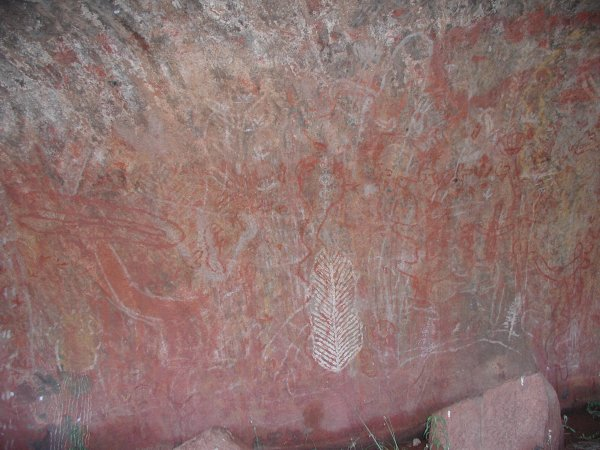
Aboriginal rock art at Uluru

Between 1918 and 1921 large adjoining areas of South Australia, Western Australia and the Northern Territory were declared as Aboriginal reserves, as sanctuaries for a nomadic people who had virtually no contact with white people. In 1920, part of Uluru-Kata Tjuta National Park was declared an Aboriginal Reserve (commonly known as the South-Western or Petermann Reserve) by the Australian Government under the Aboriginals Ordinance 1918.

During the Depression in the 1930s, the Anangu became involved in dingo scalping with "doggers" who introduced Anangu to European foods and ways. The first tourists visited the Uluru area in 1936.

From the 1940s the two main reasons for permanent and substantial European settlement in the area were Aboriginal welfare policy and the promotion of tourism at Uluru.

In 1948 the first vehicular track to Uluru was constructed, responding to increasing tourism interest in the region. Tour bus services began in the early 1950s.

The Ayers Rock National Park was recognised in 1950, and in the same year an Alice Springs resident Len Tuit accompanied a group of schoolboys on a trip to Uluru. He recognised the enormous tourism potential of the rock and began offering regular tours in 1955, with guests camping in tents and drinking water carted in from Curtin Springs. Kata Tjuta was added to the national park to create the Ayers Rock-Mount Olga National Park in 1958. The first permanent accommodation was constructed the same year, while a new airstrip allowed the first fly-in, fly-out tour groups.

In 1958, in response to pressures to support tourism enterprises, the area that is now the park was excised from the Petermann Aboriginal Reserve to be managed by the Northern Territory Reserves Board as the Ayers Rock – Mt Olga National Park. The first ranger was the legendary central Australian figure, Bill Harney.

The site came to attention on 17 August 1980 when two-month-old Azaria Chamberlain was found dead as a result of being taken by a dingo.

On 1 October 2015, traditional owners declared more than 50,000 square kilometres (19,000 sq mi) of Aboriginal freehold land surrounding the National Park an Indigenous Protected Area (IPA) named Katiti Petermann Indigenous Protected Area. As the fourth largest IPA on mainland Australia, it is larger than Switzerland, and completes a huge network of nine IPAs in Central Australia.

== Geography ==
=== Geology ===
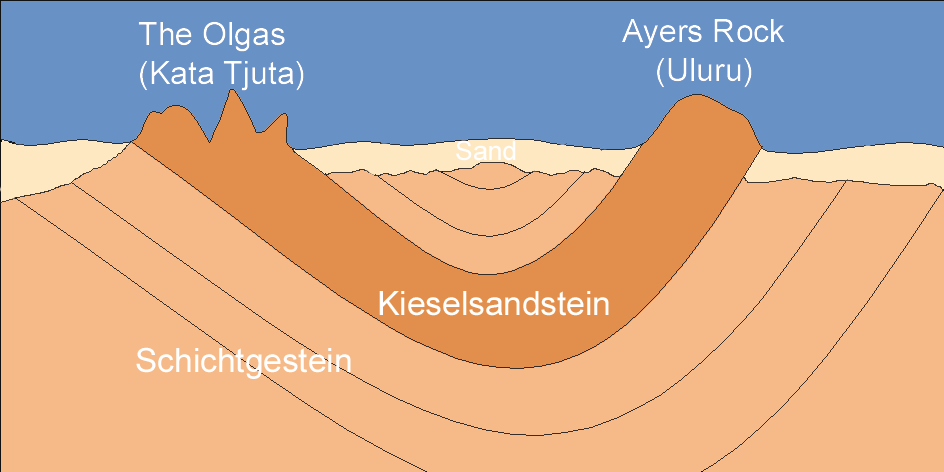
Geologic cross-section of the national park. This image presents dubious facts, compare Website of www.environment.gov.au "Formation of Uluru-Kata Tjuta" see also Talk:"Geological Formation"

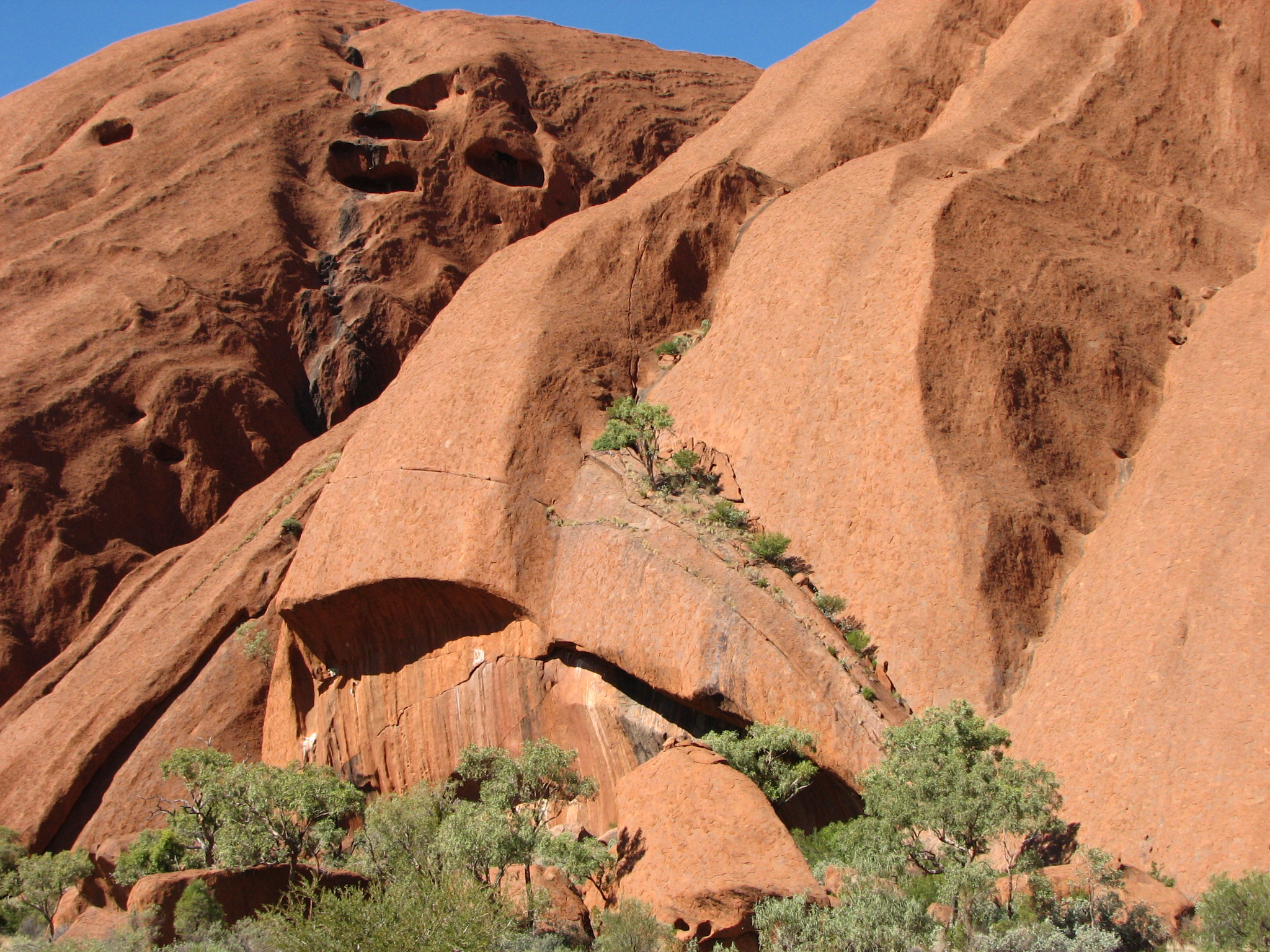
A close up view of the crevasses on Uluru

These domed rock formations are composed of conglomerate, a sedimentary rock consisting of cobbles and boulders of varying rock types including granite and basalt, cemented by a matrix of sandstone. The crevasses are due to erosion, primarily by water. Although it is a dry region, the large area of these domes collects a lot of rainwater, which runs off in steep waterfalls during rain.

500 million years ago, the entire area was covered by an inland sea and over many centuries, sand and mud fell to the bottom of the sea, creating rock and sandstone. Kata Tjuta's domes are the eroded remains of sedimentary rock from the seabed, while Uluru is a relict of the coarse grained, mineral-rich sandstone called arkose.

=== Climate and seasons ===
The park receives an average rainfall of 307.7 millimetres per year. Temperature extremes in the park have been recorded at 45 °C (113 °F) during the summer and −5 °C (23 °F) during winter nights. UV readings on most extreme summer days reach between 11 and 15. While the Central Australian environment may at first seem stark – a barren landscape supporting spectacular rock formations – closer inspection reveals it as a complex ecosystem, full of life.

Plant and animal life have adapted to the area's extreme conditions and it subsequently supports some of the most unusual flora and fauna on the planet. Many of these have long been a valuable source of bush tucker and medicine for local Aboriginal people.

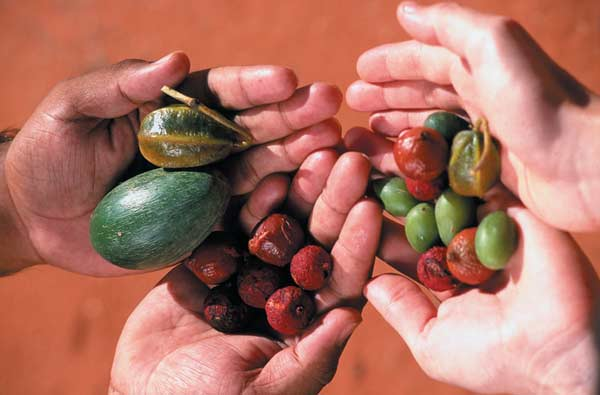
Bush tucker (bush foods) harvested at Alice Springs Desert Park

The Aboriginal Australians recognise six seasons:

1. Piryakatu (August/September) – Animals breed and food plants flower
2. Wiyaringkupai (October/November) – The really hot season when food becomes scarce
3. Itanju- (January/February) Sporadic storms can roll in suddenly
4. Wanitjunkupai (March) – Cooler weather
5. Tjuntalpa (April/May) – Clouds roll in from the south
6. Wari (June/July) – Cold season bringing morning frosts

=== Ecology ===
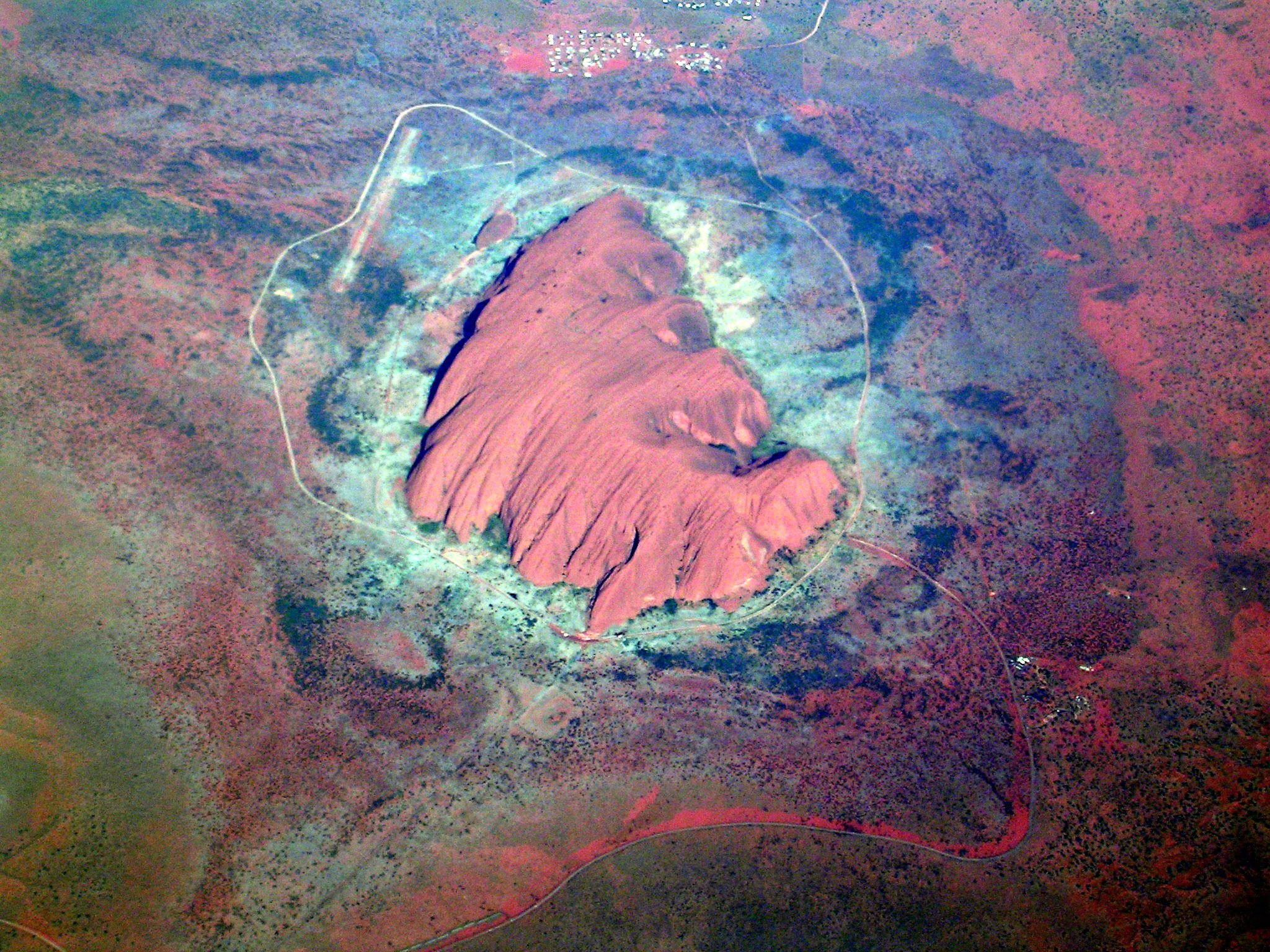
An aerial view of Uluru shows its large size.

The park is ranked as one of the most significant arid land ecosystems in the world. As a Biosphere Reserve under the UNESCO Man and the Biosphere Program, it joins at least 11 other reserves in Australia and an international network aiming to preserve the world's major ecosystem types.

== Biology ==
=== Flora ===
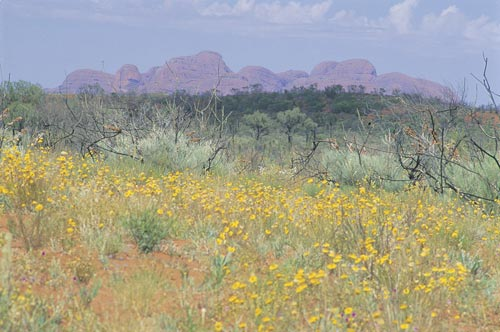
Wildflowers in bloom with Kata Tjuta in the background

Uluru-Kata Tjuta National Park flora represents a large portion of plants found in Central Australia. A number of these species are considered rare and restricted in the park or the immediate region. There are many rare and endemic plants at Uluru and Kata Tjuta. A number of other species, while found elsewhere in central Australia, may be endangered within the park.

The desert flora has adapted to the harsh conditions. The growth and reproduction of plant communities rely on irregular rainfall. Some plants are able to survive fire and some are dependent on it to reproduce. Plants are an important part of Tjukurpa, and there are ceremonies for each of the major plant foods. Many plants are associated with ancestral beings. Collection of plant foods remains a culturally important activity, reinforcing traditional links with country and Tjukurpa.

Flora in Uluru-Kata Tjuta National Park can be broken into the following categories:

- Punu – trees
- Puti – shrubs
- Tjulpun-tjulpunpa – flowers
- Ukiri – grasses

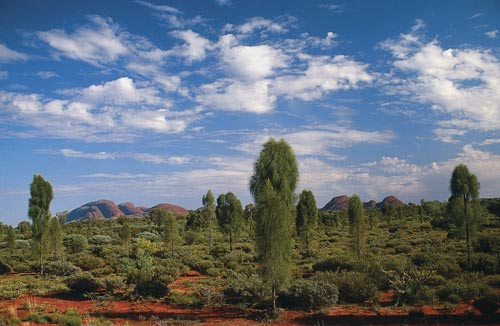
Desert oaks with Kata Tjuta in the background

Trees such as the mulga and centralian bloodwood are used to make tools such as spearheads, boomerangs and bowls. The red sap of the bloodwood is used as a disinfectant and an inhalant for coughs and colds.

Others such as the river red gum and corkwood trees like grevillea and hakeas are a source of food themselves. The white flaky crust from river red gum leaves can be rolled into balls and eaten like a lolly and the nectar from the flowers of the corkwood trees can produce a sweet drink.

The witchetty bush looks like a shrubby mulga with broad round-ended leaves. Witchetty grubs are found in the roots of this tree. Daisies and other ground flowers bloom after rain and during the winter. Others such as the wattles bloom as spring approaches. Anangu collect wattle seed, crush and mix it with water to make an edible paste which they eat raw. To make damper, the seeds are parched with hot sand so their skins can be removed before they are ground for flour.

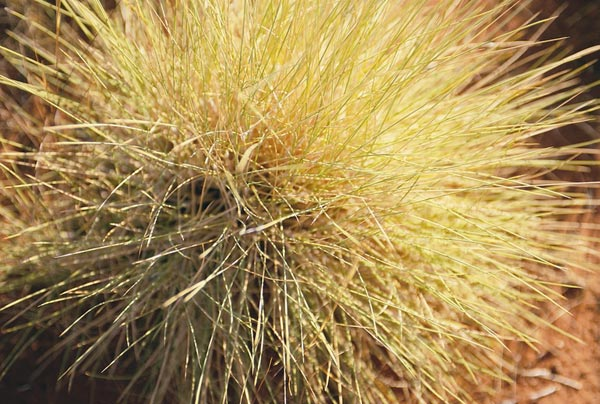
Spinifex grass

The prickly hard spinifex hummocks have enormous root systems that prevent desert sands shifting. The hummock roots spread underground beyond the prickly clump and deeply into the soil, forming an immense cone. Anangu use a resin gathered from the gummy spinifex to make gum. They thresh the spinifex until the resin particles fall free. These particles are heated until they fuse together to form a moldable black tar which Anangu work while warm. The gum is used for hunting and working implements, and to mend breaks in stone and wooden implements.

The naked woolybutt and native millet have seeds that are important Anangu foods. Women rub the seedheads from their stalks and then separate the seeds from the chaff by skilful winnowing. Using grinding stones, they then grind the seeds to flour for damper.

There are several rare and endangered species in the park. Most of them like adder's tongue ferns (Ophioglossaceae sp.) are restricted to the moist areas at the base of the monoliths, which are areas of high visitor use and subject to erosion.

Since the first Europeans arrived, 34 exotic plant species have been recorded in the park, representing about 6.4% of the total park flora. Some such as perennial buffel grass (Cenchrus ciliaris) were introduced to rehabilitate areas damaged by erosion. It is the most threatening weed in the park and has spread to invade water and nutrient rich drainage lines. Where infestation is dense, it prevents the growth of native grasses – a source of food for animals and humans. A few others such as burrgrass were brought in accidentally, carried on cars and people.

=== Fauna ===
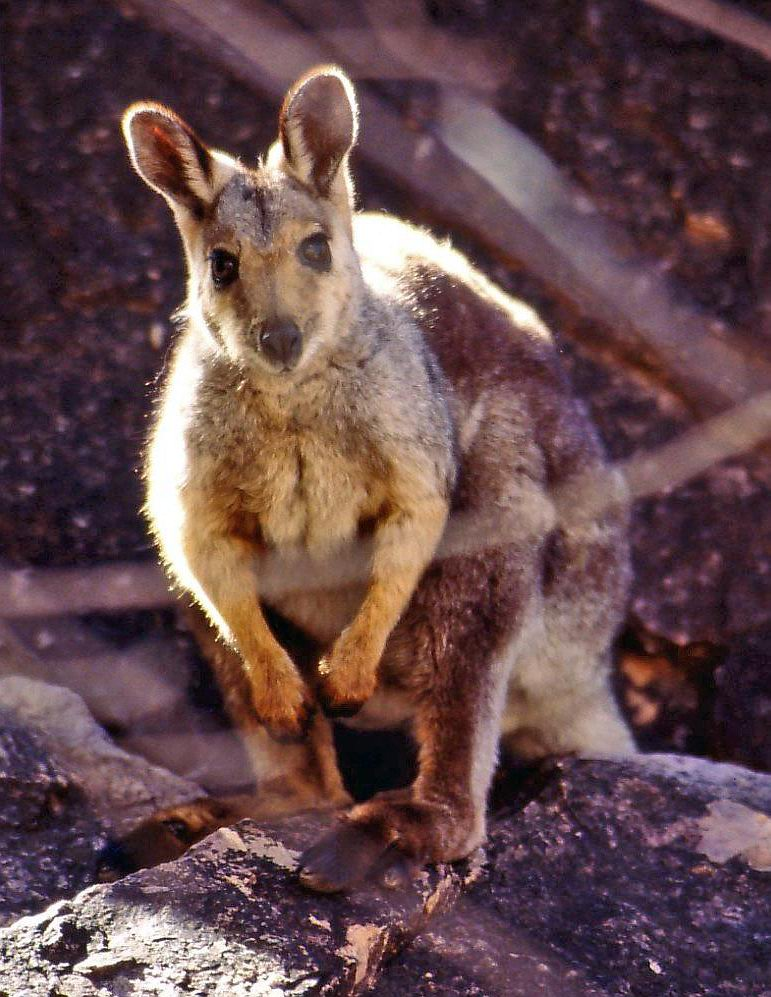
Black-footed rock-wallaby (Petrogale lateralis), Australia

Historically 46 species of native mammal are known to have been living in the Uluru region; there are currently 21 according to recent surveys. Anangu allege that a decrease in the number has implications for the condition and health of the landscape. Moves are supported for the reintroduction of locally extinct animals such as mallee fowl, brushtail possum, rufous hare wallaby or mala, bilby, burrowing bettong and the black-footed rock wallaby

The mulgara, the only mammal listed as vulnerable, is mostly restricted to the transitional sandplain area, a narrow band of country that stretches from the vicinity of Uluru, to the northern boundary of the park, and into Ayers Rock Resort. This very important area also contains the marsupial mole, woma python, or kuniya, and great desert skink.

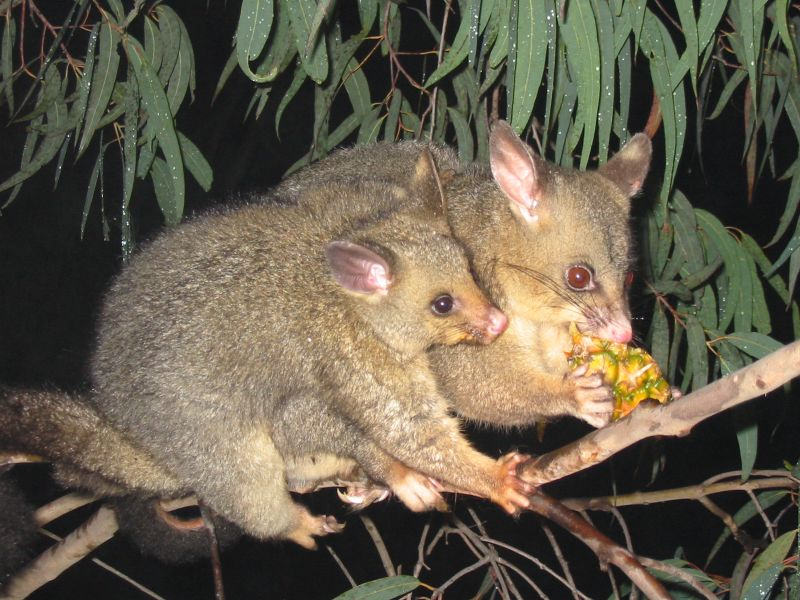
Brushtail possum, Australia

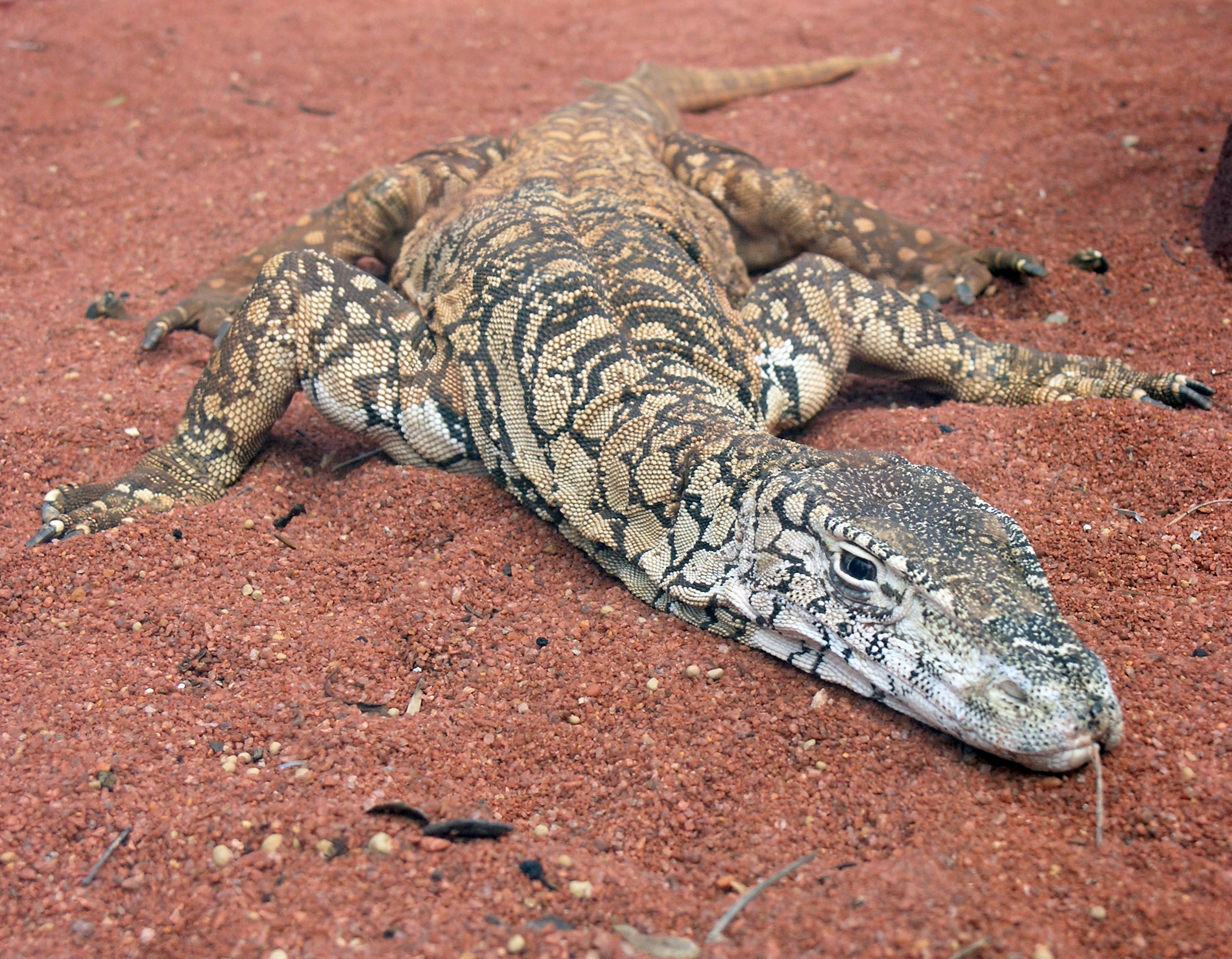
Perentie lizard, Australia

The bat population of the park comprises at least seven species that depend on day roosting sites within caves and crevices of Uluru and Kata Tjuta. Most of the bats forage for aerial prey within an airspace extending only 100 m or so from the rock face.

The park has a very rich reptile fauna of high conservation significance, with 73 species having been reliably recorded. Four species of frog are abundant at the base of Uluru and Kata Tjuta following summer rains. The great desert skink is listed as vulnerable.

Anangu continue to hunt and gather animal species in remote areas of the park and on Anangu land elsewhere. Hunting is largely confined to the red kangaroo, Australian bustard, emu and lizard such as the sand goanna and perentie.

The pressures exerted by introduced predators and herbivores on the original mammalian fauna of Central Australia were a major factor in the extinction of about 40% of the native species.

Of the 27 mammal species found in the park, six are introduced: the house mouse; camel; fox; cat; dog; and rabbit. These species are distributed throughout the park but their densities are greatest in the rich water run-off areas of Uluru and Kata Tjuta. Large numbers of rabbits led to the introduction of a rabbit control program in 1989. This has resulted in a great reduction of the rabbit population, a noticeable vegetation recovery and a reduction in predator numbers. Camels have been implicated in the reduction of plant species, particularly the more succulent species such as the quandong. The house mouse is a successful invader of disturbed environments and habitats that have lost native rodents. Subjective estimates of cat and fox numbers have been collected in association with the rabbit control program. The national threat abatement programs may provide the framework for controlling them. Anangu knowledge and tracking skills are invaluable in the management of these introduced animals. The park regulations prohibit visitors bringing animals into the park unless they are a guide dog for the blind or deaf, or a permit is granted by the Director of National Parks.

Iconic birds of Uluru-Kata Tjuta National Park include the pied butcherbird, black breasted buzzard, black-faced woodswallow and crimson chat.

=== Fire management ===
Fires have been a part of central desert land management for thousands of years and have shaped the landscape, habitats, survival of animals and patterns of vegetation. Controlled burning usually takes place during the winter months due to the cooler weather while natural fires mostly occur in the early summer months. They are usually started by the lightning strikes of dry electrical storms from the north west. When the storms arrive the weather is usually hot, dry and windy – conditions ideal for raging fires. Damage can be severe and widespread. Destructive bushfires burnt much of Uluru-Kata Tjuta National Park and luxury accommodation at the Ayers Rock Resort was destroyed in 2002–03.

Traditional burning of the Uluru area stopped when Anangu were driven from the region during the 1930s. During the 1940s rainfall was good and vegetation flourished. The 1950 fire, fed by the fuel grown during the previous 20 years, wiped out about one third of Uluru-Kata Tjuta National Park's vegetation. The pattern repeated itself and in 1976 two fires burnt 76% of the park. Over the same period more species of medium-sized mammals became extinct around Uluru and Kata Tjuta. Today most fires in the park are lit following land management patterns traditionally practiced by Anangu. Traditional fire and land management skills enable Anangu to burn in a way that will give the desired result. These skills are vital for the preservation of the central Australian ecology.

== Activities ==
=== General facilities ===
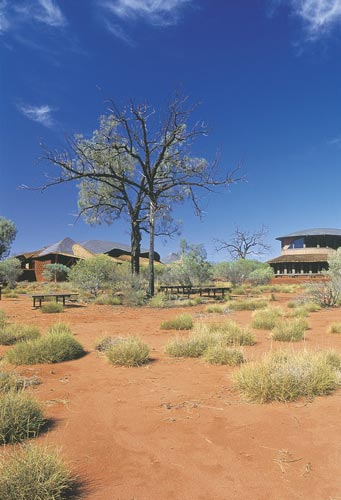
Cultural Centre Uluru

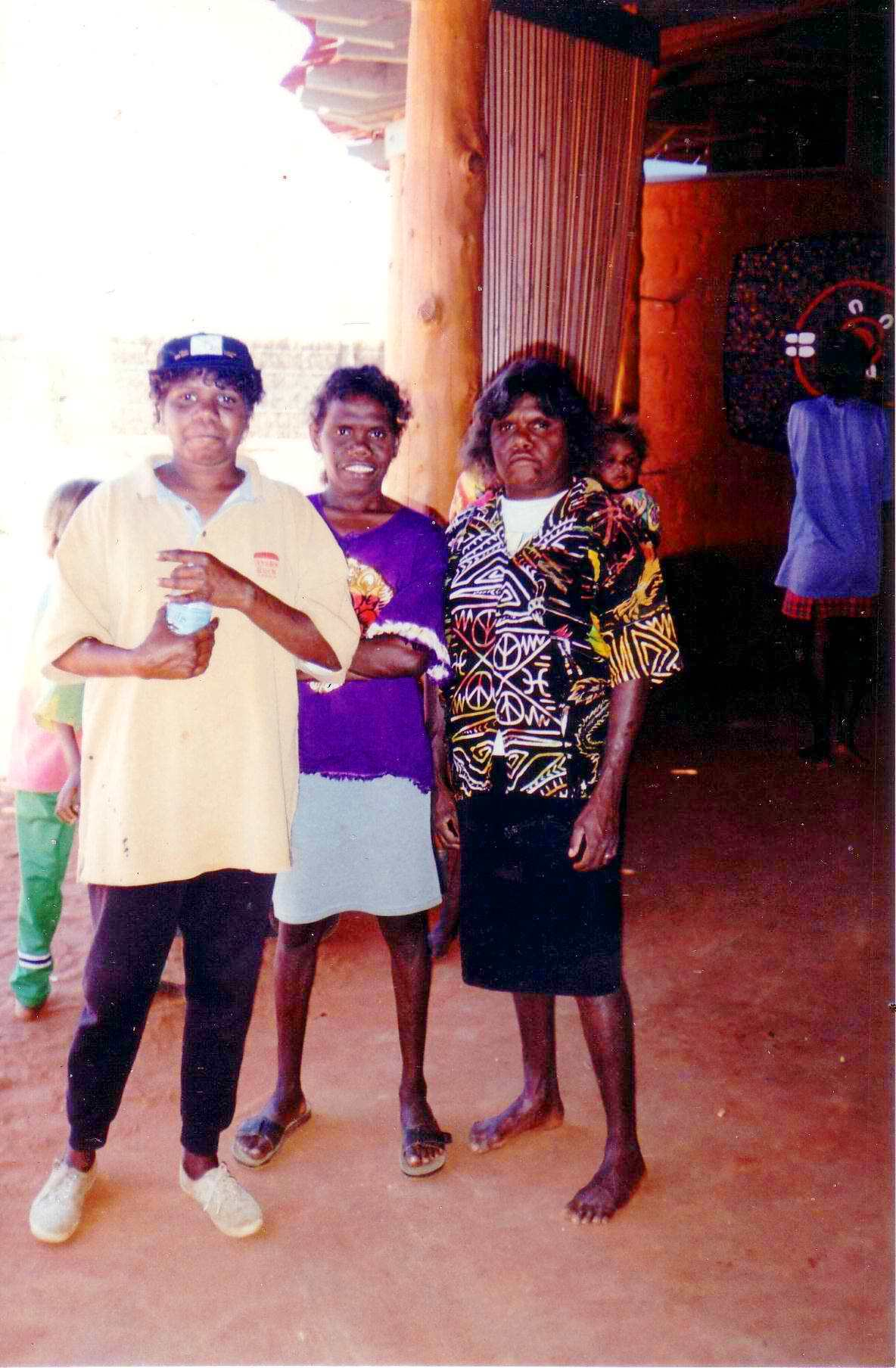
Locals at the opening of the Cultural Centre, Uluru. 1995

The park is open year-round from sunrise to sunset. These times will vary depending on the season. Occasionally parts of the park may be temporarily closed for cultural reasons.

The park entrance fee for Uluru-Kata Tjuta National Park is $25 per person 16 years of age and over. This fee is valid for 3 consecutive days and helps to maintain the park. One quarter goes back to Anangu, the traditional owners, to help them maintain their families and the Mutitjulu community.

The Uluru-Kata Tjuta National Park Cultural Centre by recognised Australian architect Gregory Burgess located inside the park on the main road to Uluru provides an introduction to Tjukurpa (law, knowledge, religion, philosophy), Anangu art, Anangu way of life (traditional and current), history, languages, wildlife and joint management of the park. There are also art and craft demonstrations, bush tucker sessions, plants walks and cultural presentations.

There are displays featuring photo collages, oral history sound panels, Pitjantjatjara language learning interactives, soundscapes, videos and artefacts. Explanations are provided in Pitjantjatjara, English, Italian, Japanese, German and French. A touch wall for visually impaired people ensures that the messages are accessible to everyone. Entry to the Cultural Centre is free.

The Walkatjara Art Centre is owned and operated by the local Aboriginal artists from the Mutitjulu Community. Most weekdays the Walkatjara Artists come to paint and work in the Art Room and receive a percentage of sales.

=== Tourism ===
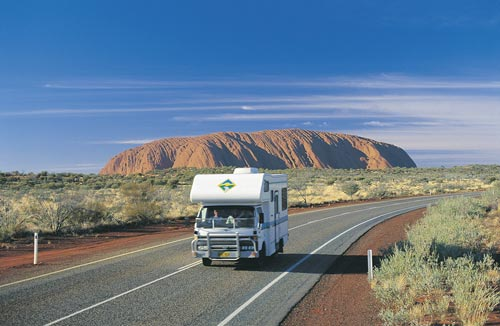
Driving – Lasseter Highway to Uluru-Kata Tjuta National Park

The development of tourism infrastructure adjacent to the base of Uluru that began in the 1950s soon produced adverse environmental impacts. It was decided in the early 1970s to remove all accommodation-related tourist facilities and re-establish them outside the park. In 1975 a reservation of 104 square kilometres of land beyond the park's northern boundary, 15 kilometres from Uluru, was approved for the development of a tourist facility and an associated airport, to be known as Yulara. The campground within the park was closed in 1983 and the motels finally closed in late 1984, coinciding with the opening of the Yulara resort. In 1992 the majority interest in the Yulara Resort held by the Northern Territory Government was sold and the resort was renamed 'Ayers Rock Resort'.

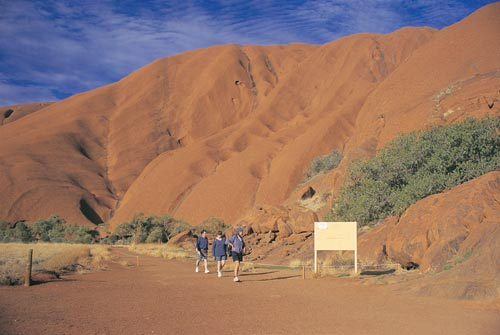
Mala Walk Uluru

The listing of Uluru-Kata Tjuta National Park ensures the park remains a world-class destination for both its cultural and natural heritage. Visitors will continue to have a unique cultural experience at the park and leave knowing that the park is managed according to cultural practices that date back tens of thousands of years.

Since the park was listed as a World Heritage Site, annual visitor numbers have risen to over 400,000 visitors in the year 2000. Increased tourism provides regional and national economic benefits. It also presents an ongoing challenge to balance conservation of cultural values and visitor needs.

There are a number of sightseeing and cultural tours to Uluru that offer walks that visitors can take around the major attractions of the park. The Base Walk is one of the best ways to see Uluru. Other walks surrounding Uluru include the Liru Walk, Mala Walk and Kuniya walk, while the sunrise and sunset viewing areas provide great photo opportunities.

The border of the national park is also home to the Longitude 131° Eco resort.

=== Art centre gallery ===
Maruku Arts is a large and successful Aboriginal Australian-owned and -operated enterprise, run by Anangu (people of the Western and Central Deserts of Australia). It has a warehouse based in Mutitjulu community (at the eastern end of the rock), a retail gallery at Uluru-Kata Tjuta National Park Cultural Centre, as well as a market stall in Yulara town square. Its artwork consists mainly of paintings and woodcarvings. With about 900 artists in the collective, it provides an important source of income living in remote communities across central Australia. It seeks to "keep culture strong and alive, for future generations of artists, and [to] make culture accessible in an authentic way to those that seek a more in-depth understanding".

Maruku is one of ten Indigenous-owned and -governed enterprises that go to make up the APY Art Centre Collective, established in 2013.

=== Hiking and climbing ===
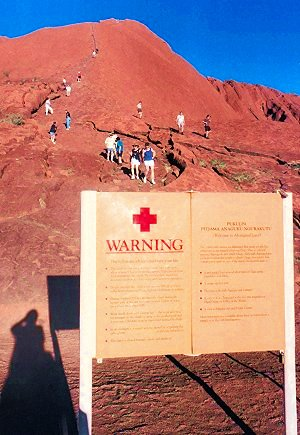
Climbers and sign

The Uluru climb is the traditional route taken by ancestral Mala men upon their arrival to Uluru. Anangu do not climb Uluru because of its great spiritual significance.

The Valley of the Winds walk is an alternative to climbing Uluru and offers views of the landscape from two lookout points along the track. The walk is sometimes steep, rocky and difficult. For safety reasons this walk is closed under certain circumstances including heat, darkness and during rescue.

In November 2017, the national park's board voted unanimously to ban climbing on Uluru and climbing has been banned since October 2019.

=== Accommodations ===
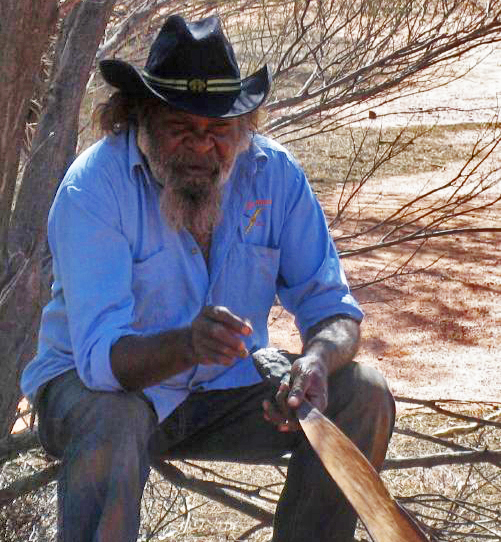
Aboriginal Anangu ranger at Uluru doing a demonstration

The Aboriginal community of Mutitjulu is inside the park area, but tourists must stay at the resorts in Yulara, just outside the national park. Ayers Rock Resort in Yulara offers a range of accommodation from camp sites to five-star luxury. There are also several dining options, a supermarket and a range of tour operators. The national park and town are served by Connellan Airport.

Slightly further afield is the luxury tented accommodation at Longitude 131, with views of Uluru from the tents.

Camping is not permitted in the park.

== See also ==
- Kata Tjuta
- Protected areas of the Northern Territory
- Protected areas managed by the Australian government
- List of national parks of Australia
- Tony Tjamiwa
- List of biosphere reserves in Australia
