= Mereenie, Northern Territory =

Mereenie Northern Territory
- Coordinates: 23°53′39″S 131°49′34″E
- Population: 30 (2016 census)
  - Density: 0.0061/km^{2} (0.0157/sq mi)
- Established: 4 April 2007
- Postcode(s): 0872
- Area: 4,951 km^{2} (1,911.6 sq mi)
- Time zone: ACST (UTC+9:30)
- Location: 1,277 km (793 mi) S of Darwin; 250 km (155 mi) W of Alice Springs
- LGA(s): MacDonnell Region
- Territory electorate(s): Stuart
- Federal division(s): Lingiari
Mean max temp	Mean min temp	Annual rainfall
30.7 °C; 87 °F	15.6 °C; 60 °F	303.6 mm 12 in
Suburbs around Mereenie:
Lake Mackay	Lake Mackay; Kunparrka; Mount Zeil	Mount Zeil
Lake Mackay	Mereenie	Mount Zeil; Namatjira; Areyonga; Namatjira
Petermann	Petermann	Petermann
- Footnotes: Locations; Adjoining localities

Mereenie is a locality in the Northern Territory of Australia. It is about 250 km west of Alice Springs and northeast of Uluru. It is on the "Inner Mereenie Loop" road which was completed as a sealed road in 2016 providing access for caravans and two-wheel-drive vehicles.

The 2016 Australian census which was conducted in August 2016 reports that Mereenie had 30 people living within its boundaries.

Mereenie is located within the federal division of Lingiari, the territory electoral division of Stuart and the local government area of the MacDonnell Region.

== Mereenie Oil Field ==
The Mereenie Oil Field is a source of oil and gas in the Amadeus Basin. It is connected to Darwin by the Amadeus Gas Pipeline and to Alice Springs by an oil pipeline. It was discovered in 1963 and began production in 1984. Since then it has produced over 16 million barrels of oil and condensate and over 240 billion cubic feet of natural gas (250 PJ). Production in 2014 was 225,600 barrels of oil, 41,000 BOE of condensate and 5 PJ of natural gas.

Since September 2015, the oil and gas field has been operated by Central Petroleum. Central is 50% owner with a subsidiary of Macquarie Bank owning the other 50% since 2017 when it bought that share from Santos Limited.
