= Wallace Rockhole =

Wallace Rockhole Ulana Northern Territory
- Coordinates: 24°7′15″S 133°5′11″E
- Population: 67 (2011 census)
- Postcode(s): 0872
- Location: 120 km (75 mi) from Alice Springs
- LGA(s): MacDonnell Region
- Territory electorate(s): Namatjira
- Federal division(s): Lingiari

Wallace Rockhole is a community in Ljirapinta Ward of the MacDonnell Region in the Northern Territory of Australia, 120 km km west southwest of Alice Springs.
