= Lake Mackay, Northern Territory =

Lake Mackay Northern Territory
- Coordinates: 22°34′05″S 129°49′46″E
- Population: 5 (2016 census)
  - Density: 0/km^{2} (0.000166/sq mi)
- Established: 4 April 2007
- Postcode(s): 0872
- Elevation: 454 m (1,490 ft)(weather station)
- Area: 77,857 km^{2} (30,060.8 sq mi)
- Time zone: ACST (UTC+9:30)
- Location: 1,202 km (747 mi) S of Darwin City; 458 km (285 mi) W of Alice Springs
- LGA(s): Central Desert Region; MacDonnell Region
- Territory electorate(s): Stuart
- Federal division(s): Lingiari
Mean max temp	Mean min temp	Annual rainfall
32.8 °C; 91 °F	19.4 °C; 67 °F	279.5 mm 11 in
Suburbs around Lake Mackay:
Western Australia	Tanami	Tanami
Western Australia	Lake Mackay	Chilla Well; Anmatjere; Mount Zeil; Kunparrka; Mereenie
Western Australia	Petermann	Petermann
- Footnotes: Locations; Adjoining localities (Note: The locality of Lake Mackay fully surrounds the localities of Kintore and Nyirripi.)

Lake Mackay is a locality in the Northern Territory of Australia located on the territory’s south-west adjoining the border with the state of Western Australia about 1,202 kilometres (747 mi) south of the territory capital of Darwin and about 458 kilometres (285 mi) west of the municipal seat in Alice Springs.

The locality consists of the following land (from north to south): the Lake Mackay Aboriginal Land Trust, the Mount Doreen Station pastoral property, the former Newhaven Station pastoral property and the western part of the Haasts Bluff Aboriginal Land Trust. It fully surrounds the localities of Kintore and Nyirripi.

The Tanami Road passes through the locality from Yuendumu in the south to the north-west via Mount Dooreen Station on its way to Halls Creek.

The locality’s boundaries and name were gazetted on 4 April 2007. Its name is derived from Lake Mackay, the “intermittent lake feature on the Northern Territory/Western Australian border” which is located within the locality’s boundaries and which itself was named in 1934 after the explorer and long-distance cyclist, Donald Mackay.

The 2016 Australian census which was conducted in August 2016 reports that Lake Mackay had five people living within its boundaries.

Lake Mackay is located within the federal division of Lingiari, the territory electoral division of Stuart and the local government areas of the Central Desert Region and the MacDonnell Region.
