= Voyages Tourism Australia =

Tourism operator in Australia

- Type: Subsidiary
- Founded: March 2000
- Headquarters: Sydney, Australia
- Number of locations: 2: Ayers Rock Resort; Mossman
- Parent: Journey Beyond
- Website: www.voyages.com.au

Voyages Tourism Australia, commonly called Voyages, manages tourism and resort facilities in the Northern Territory, and in Queensland, Australia. Its parent company is Journey Beyond, which acquired the company named Voyages Indigenous Tourism Australia in March 2026.

Voyages operates multiple properties at Ayers Rock Resort, Yulara, Northern Territory, including Sails in the Desert, Desert Gardens Hotel, Emu Walk Apartments, Outback Hotel, Outback Lodge, and Ayers Rock Campground, as well as the Mossman Gorge Cultural Centre in Mossman, Queensland.

== History ==
Several resorts were built in and around Yulara during the 1980s. Following a chequered history of the tourism developments in the Northern Territory, the Ayers Rock Resort Company Limited was formed in 1992 and after a period of growth, acquired resorts at Alice Springs and Kings Canyon and established profitability. In September 1997, GPT purchased Ayers Rock Resort Company Limited and changed its name to Voyages Hotels & Resorts in March 2000. A year later, Voyages purchased Odyssey Tours and Safaris, Coconut Beach Rainforest Lodge and Ferntree Rainforest Lodge. Luxury resort, Longitude 131°, was opened in June 2002 under the Voyages banner.

In July 2004, Voyages acquired P&O's Australian Resorts, adding properties in Tasmania, Queensland and on the Great Barrier Reef. It opened Wrotham Park Lodge in September 2004 and acquired El Questro Homestead in July 2005. In early 2006, Voyages sold its Odyssey Tours and Safaris to New South Wales-based Australian Wilderness Tours. Coconut Beach Rainforest Lodge, Ferntree Rainforest Lodge, Jungle Lodge and dive operation Odyssey H2O were also sold a year later.

In July 2009, Cradle Mountain Lodge was sold to the Cradle Mountain Resort Pty Ltd. Also in July 2009, Silky Oaks Lodge was purchased by Australian-based Gondwana Resorts Pty Ltd. September 2009 saw the sales of Bedarra and Dunk islands to Hideaway Resorts Pty Ltd. In November 2009, the Lizard Island, Heron Island, Wilson Island and King's Canyon Resort interests were sold to Delaware North. Alice Springs Resort was handed over to Alice Springs Resort Enterprises Pty Ltd in November and operated as the Chifley Alice Springs Resort.

In 2010, GPT sold Voyages Hotels & Resorts to the Indigenous Land Corporation (ILC; later ILSC) and the ILC formed a new subsidiary, Voyages Indigenous Tourism Australia, to operate the ILC's tourism portfolio. Voyages established a training academy at the Ayers Rock Resort to provide young Indigenous people with accredited training in hospitality and the resort significantly increased its level of Indigenous staff from 1 per cent of the workforce at time of acquisition to approximately 32 per cent of the workforce in 2015.

In 2013, Voyages sold Longitude 131° to Bailey Lodges.

In March 2026, Journey Beyond acquired Voyages Indigenous Tourism Australia from the ILSC, rebranding it as Voyages Tourism Australia, following extensive consultation led by the ILSC with the Traditional Owners – Anangu of Yulara and the Kuku Yalanji of Mossman Gorge. The reason for removing "Indigenous" from the name is to reflect that the company is no longer owned by the ILSC.

As of 2026, Voyages partners with the National Indigenous Training Academy (NITA) to developing education and employment pathways for Indigenous Australians in the tourism industry in Australia.
