= Illamurta Springs Conservation Reserve =

Protected area in the Northern Territory, Australia

- IUCN category V (protected landscape/seascape)
- Location within Northern Territory
- Location: Northern Territory, Ghan
- Coordinates: 24°18′15″S 132°41′20″E
- Area: 1.29 km^{2} (0.50 sq mi)
- Established: 1969
- Governing body: Parks and Wildlife Commission of the Northern Territory

Illamurta Springs Conservation Reserve is a protected area in the Northern Territory of Australia in the locality of Ghan about 42 kilometres (26 mi) south of Hermannsburg and 140 kilometres (87 mi) west of Alice Springs. The southern foothills of the James Range and the permanent spring from which the reserve takes its name are found within the reserve.

== History ==
The area is significant to the Western Arrente peoples and is part of the Kunnea Snake Dreamtime. The Arrente have occupied the region for thousands of years with artefacts such as grindstones being found in and around the reserve.

The first European to visit was Ernest Giles who explored the area in 1874, the first settlers and cattle stations were established nearly a decade later.

The site includes the ruins of the Illamurta Springs Police Station which was established in 1893 and operated until 1912. The police station was built to combat Aboriginal resistance against pastoralists in the area, mostly by spearing cattle. Once spearing stock stopped the police station was used as an administration centre for the distribution of rations to Aboriginal people.

Mounted Constable Ernest Cowle led the younger members of the Horn Expedition across the Lake Amadeus saltpan to Uluru and then return across the McDonnell Ranges in 1894. He became friends with Walter Baldwin Spencer at this time, and later, when serving at Illumurta Springs, collaborated with Spencer and Frank Gillen on their famous work The Native Tribes of Central Australia (1899). This work was later described by John Mulvaney, considered the "father of Australian archaeology", as one of Australia's most influential books in the history of ideas", and he gave much credit to Cowle and also Paddy Byrne, telegraphist at Charlotte Waters.

The conservation reserve was listed on the now-defunct Register of the National Estate in 1980 and listed on the Northern Territory Heritage Register on 14 September 1994.

== See also ==
Protected areas of the Northern Territory
