= Mount Zeil =

Mountain in Northern Territory, Australia

- Urlatherrke
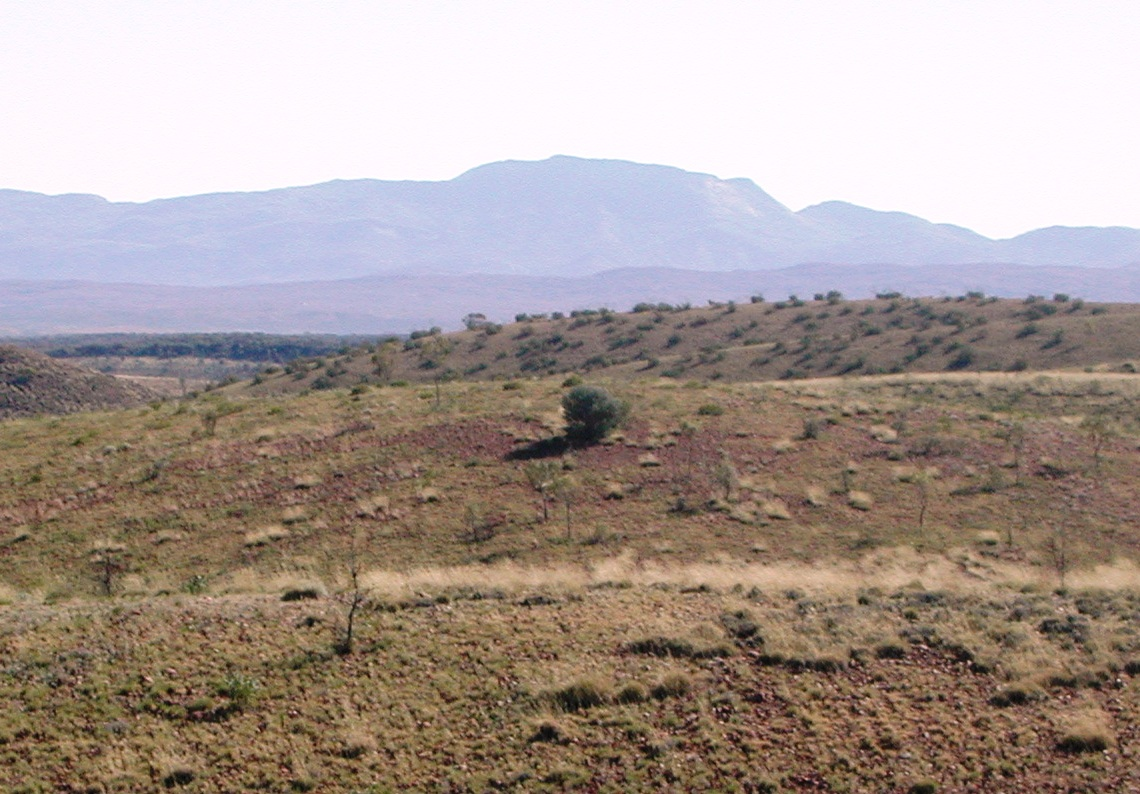
- Mount Zeil viewed from the south

Highest point
- Elevation: 1,531 m (5,023 ft)AHD
- Coordinates: 23°24′06″S 132°23′45″E

Geography
- Location within Northern Territory
- Location: Mount Zeil, Northern Territory, Australia
- Parent range: MacDonnell Ranges

Mount Zeil (Western Arrernte: Urlatherrke) (1,531 m or 5,023 ft) is a mountain in the Northern Territory of Australia located in the locality of Mount Zeil in the western MacDonnell Ranges. It is the highest peak in the Northern Territory, and the highest peak on the Australian mainland west of the Great Dividing Range.

== History ==
It is believed that Mount Zeil was named during or following Ernest Giles's 1872 expedition, probably after Count Karl von Waldburg-Zeil (1841–1890), who had recently distinguished himself with geographic explorations in Spitzbergen; a footnote in Giles' published journal implies that the naming was instigated by his benefactor, Baron Ferdinand von Mueller.

== Indigenous etymology ==
The name for Mount Zeil in the Western Arrernte language is Urlatherrke, referring to the Yeperenye caterpillars.

== See also ==
- List of mountains in Australia
