= Yulara, Northern Territory =

Yulara
- Town
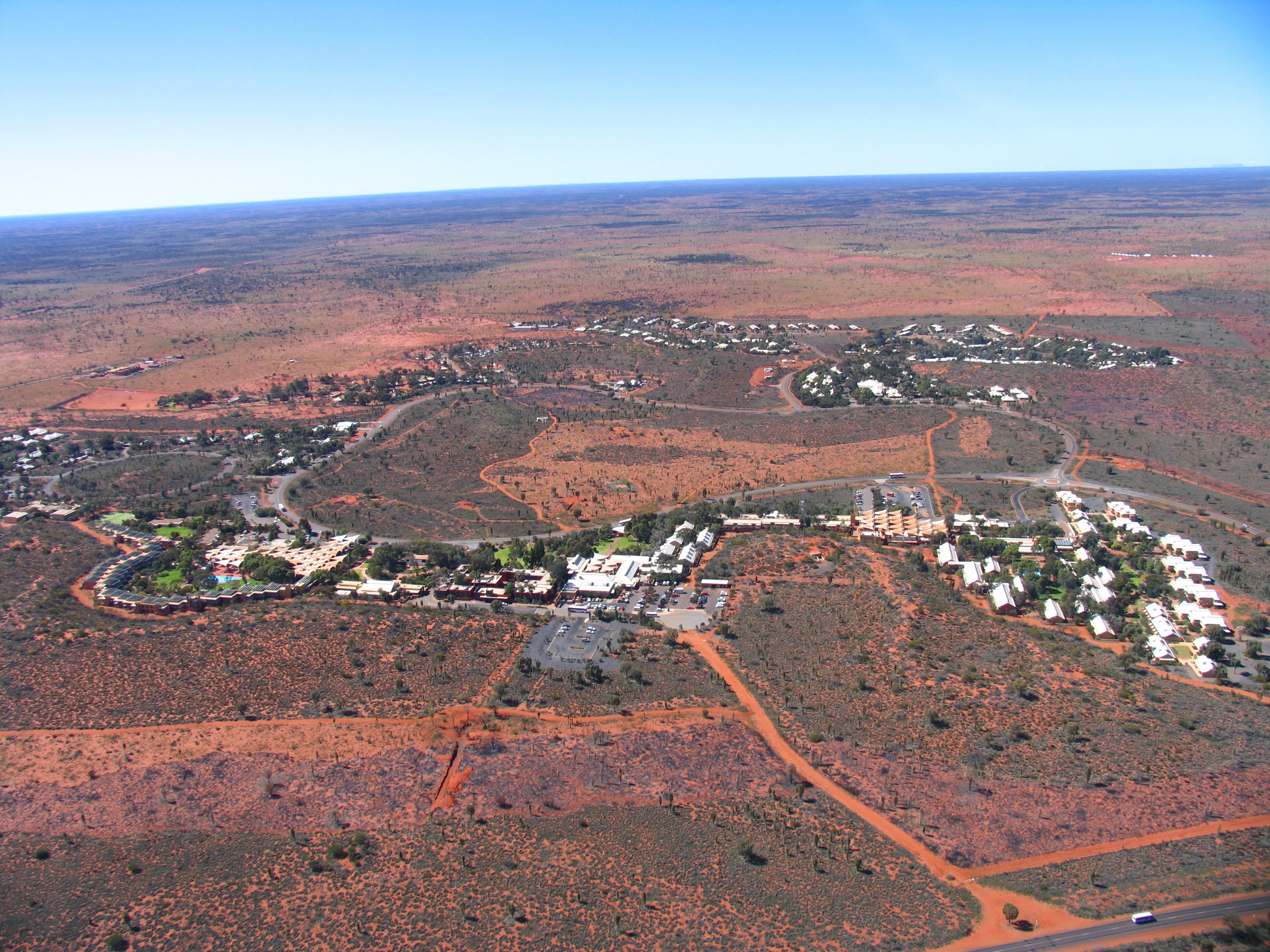
- Yulara from helicopter, August 2004

- Coordinates: 25°12′25″S 130°58′16″E
- Country: Australia
- State: Northern Territory
- LGA: Yulara – Ayers Rock Resort
- Location: 1,421 km (883 mi) S of Darwin City; 428 km (266 mi) from Alice Springs; 18 km (11 mi) from Uluru
- Established: 10 August 1976 (town); 4 April 2007 (locality)

Government
  - Territory electorate: Gwoja
  - Federal division: Lingiari

Area
  - Total: 104 km^{2} (40 sq mi)
- Elevation (airport): 492 m (1,614 ft)

Population
  - Total: 853 (2021 census)
  - Density: 8.20/km^{2} (21.24/sq mi)
- Time zone: UTC+9:30 (ACST)
- Postcode: 0872
- Mean max temp: 30.0 °C (86.0 °F)
- Mean min temp: 14.0 °C (57.2 °F)
- Annual rainfall: 285.2 mm (11.23 in)
Localities around Yulara
Petermann	Petermann	Petermann
Petermann	Yulara	Petermann
Petermann	Petermann	Petermann
- Locations; Adjoining localities

Yulara is a town in the southern region of the Northern Territory, Australia. It is an unincorporated enclave within the MacDonnell Region. At the 2016 census, Yulara had a permanent population of 1,099, in an area of 103.33 square kilometres (39.90 sq mi). It is 18 kilometres (11 mi) by road from the World Heritage Site of Uluru (Ayers Rock), and 55 kilometres (34 mi) from Kata Tjuta (The Olgas). It is in the Northern Territory electorate of Gwoja and the federal electorate of Lingiari.

== History ==
By the early 1970s, the pressure of unstructured and unregulated tourism, including motels near the base of Uluru (Ayers Rock), was having detrimental effects on the environment in the area of both Uluru and Kata Tjuta. Following the recommendation of a Senate Select Committee, which was to remove all developments near the base of the rock, and build a new resort to support tourism in the Uluṟu-Kata Tjuṯa National Park, the Commonwealth Government agreed in 1973 to relocate accommodation facilities to a new site outside the park. On 10 August 1976, the Governor General proclaimed the new town of Yulara, some 14 kilometres (8.7 mi) from Uluru.

After the Northern Territory was granted self-government in 1978, the development of the new town became a priority of the Northern Territory government. Between 1978 and 1981, basic infrastructure, such as roads and water supply, was provided via the government's capital works program. In 1980, the government set up the Yulara Development Company Ltd to provide tourist accommodation, staff housing and a shopping centre.

Between 1982 and 1984, the first stage of the resort was constructed for the Northern Territory Government by Yulara Development Company Ltd., at a cost of A$130 million. The resort was designed by Philip Cox & Associates and won the Royal Australian Institute of Architects (RAIA) Sir Zelman Cowen Award for Public Architecture in 1985. In 2019, it won the Northern Territory Enduring Architecture Award and the National Award for Enduring Architecture.

When the new facilities became fully operational in late 1984, the Commonwealth Government terminated all the leases for the old motels near the Rock, and the area was rehabilitated by the National Park Service (now called Parks Australia). Around the same time, the national park was renamed Uluṟu-Kata Tjuṯa, and its ownership was transferred to the local Indigenous people, who leased it back to the Parks Australia for 99 years.

There were originally three competing hotels, but that detracted from the viability of the whole enterprise, with the company (and, indirectly, the government) incurring massive operating losses. Between 1990 and 1992, the competing hotel operators were replaced by a single operator, the government-owned Investnorth Management Pty Ltd. In 1992, the government sold, through open tender, a 40% interest in the Yulara Development Company and, therefore, the resort, to a venture capital consortium.

In 1997, the entire resort was again sold by open tender to General Property Trust, which appointed Voyages Hotels & Resorts as operator. Voyages operated all aspects of the resort, with the exception of the post office. Almost all residents of the town rented their housing from Voyages, but the government leased some housing for its employees. Most residents are either workers in the resort or tour operators.

In 2011, the resort was sold once more, to the Indigenous Land Corporation, which operated the resort under its subsidiary, Voyages Indigenous Tourism Australia. In 2026, the since-renamed Indigenous Land and Sea Corporation sold the resort to Journey Beyond, a tourism company that operates The Ghan and other luxury trains.

== Demographics ==
The 2016 Australian census found that Yulara had a population of 1,099 people, which had the following characteristics:

- Aboriginal Australians and Torres Strait Islanders made up 14.2% of the population.
- 52.8% of people were born in Australia and 62.6% of people spoke only English at home.
- The most common response for religion was "no religion" at 38.4%.

== Transport ==
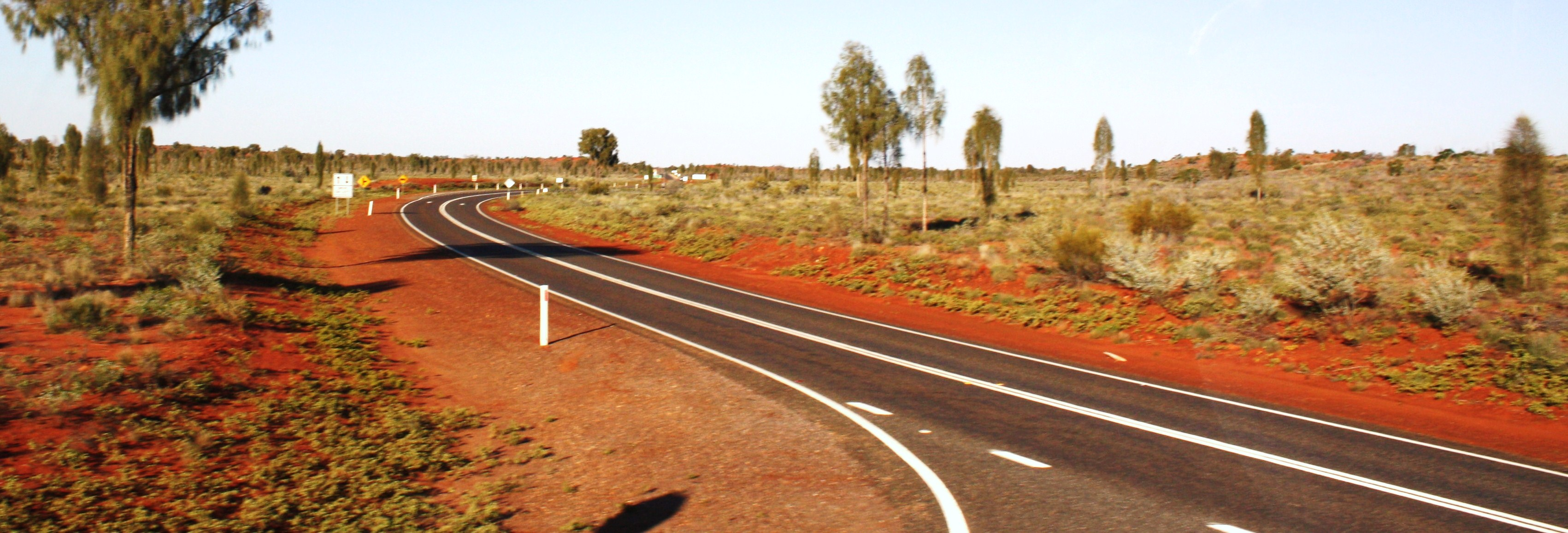
Yulara NT 1

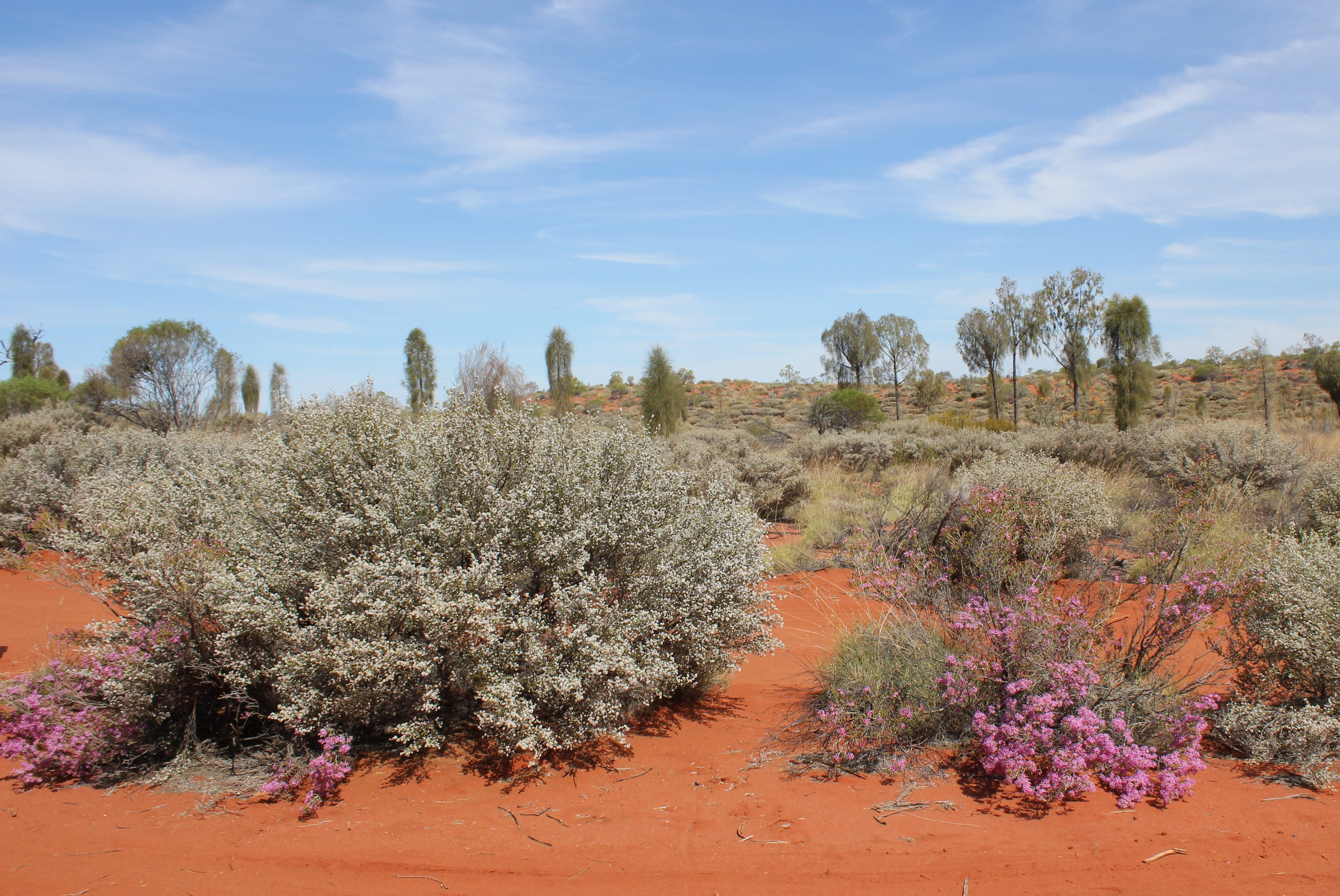
Springtime in the desert

Ayers Rock Airport, also known as Connellan Airport, is about six kilometres north of Yulara. It makes it possible to reach Yulara from Sydney, Melbourne, Alice Springs, Cairns, Adelaide, Brisbane or Darwin in less time than the five-hour car journey from Alice Springs, the nearest major town, 428 kilometres (266 mi) north-east.

The resort is served by one major road, the Lasseter Highway, which links it to surrounding roads and landmarks. In the early 2020s, the highway was expanded to cope with increase tourist traffic. The sealed highway runs east to meet the Stuart Highway. The roads in other directions are not well maintained or travelled. The Great Central Road heads west and south-west into Western Australia, but is generally only suitable for high-clearance four-wheel drive vehicles. Transit permits from Aboriginal Land Councils are required to travel west of Kata-Tjuta.

== Climate ==
Yulara has an arid climate (BWh), with long, hot summers and short, cool winters, and scant rainfall year-round. Frost may occur on some winter mornings.

Climate data for Yulara Aero (1991–2020, extremes 1983–present)
Month	Jan	Feb	Mar	Apr	May	Jun	Jul	Aug	Sep	Oct	Nov	Dec	Year
Record high °C (°F)	46.8 (116.2)	45.8 (114.4)	45.3 (113.5)	39.6 (103.3)	35.7 (96.3)	31.7 (89.1)	31.1 (88.0)	37.5 (99.5)	38.7 (101.7)	42.3 (108.1)	45.2 (113.4)	47.1 (116.8)	47.1 (116.8)
Mean maximum °C (°F)	43.5 (110.3)	42.4 (108.3)	40.1 (104.2)	36.5 (97.7)	31.4 (88.5)	27.4 (81.3)	27.8 (82.0)	31.4 (88.5)	36.2 (97.2)	39.7 (103.5)	41.8 (107.2)	43.0 (109.4)	44.4 (111.9)
Mean daily maximum °C (°F)	38.4 (101.1)	37.0 (98.6)	34.5 (94.1)	30.1 (86.2)	24.3 (75.7)	20.3 (68.5)	20.8 (69.4)	23.8 (74.8)	29.1 (84.4)	32.5 (90.5)	35.0 (95.0)	36.4 (97.5)	30.2 (86.3)
Daily mean °C (°F)	30.7 (87.3)	29.7 (85.5)	27.0 (80.6)	22.4 (72.3)	16.8 (62.2)	12.9 (55.2)	12.7 (54.9)	14.9 (58.8)	20.0 (68.0)	23.9 (75.0)	26.8 (80.2)	28.7 (83.7)	22.2 (72.0)
Mean daily minimum °C (°F)	23.0 (73.4)	22.3 (72.1)	19.5 (67.1)	14.7 (58.5)	9.2 (48.6)	5.5 (41.9)	4.5 (40.1)	6.0 (42.8)	10.8 (51.4)	15.2 (59.4)	18.5 (65.3)	21.0 (69.8)	14.2 (57.5)
Mean minimum °C (°F)	17.4 (63.3)	16.4 (61.5)	13.0 (55.4)	8.1 (46.6)	3.6 (38.5)	0.1 (32.2)	−0.8 (30.6)	0.5 (32.9)	3.9 (39.0)	8.3 (46.9)	12.2 (54.0)	14.7 (58.5)	−1.1 (30.0)
Record low °C (°F)	12.7 (54.9)	12.1 (53.8)	8.0 (46.4)	4.1 (39.4)	1.1 (34.0)	−2.7 (27.1)	−3.6 (25.5)	−2.3 (27.9)	−1.0 (30.2)	3.7 (38.7)	6.5 (43.7)	9.9 (49.8)	−3.6 (25.5)
Average rainfall mm (inches)	29.7 (1.17)	40.8 (1.61)	28.6 (1.13)	15.6 (0.61)	11.1 (0.44)	17.4 (0.69)	16.8 (0.66)	5.3 (0.21)	8.0 (0.31)	22.8 (0.90)	34.2 (1.35)	46.5 (1.83)	276.8 (10.91)
Average rainy days (≥ 1 mm)	3.8	3.0	2.0	1.8	1.4	1.5	1.8	1.1	1.4	2.9	3.9	4.8	29.4
Average afternoon relative humidity (%)	18	23	22	24	31	35	32	25	19	19	19	24	24
Average dew point °C (°F)	6.7 (44.1)	8.1 (46.6)	6.0 (42.8)	4.4 (39.9)	3.9 (39.0)	2.4 (36.3)	0.8 (33.4)	−0.4 (31.3)	0.2 (32.4)	1.9 (35.4)	3.9 (39.0)	7.3 (45.1)	3.8 (38.8)
Source: Australian Bureau of Meteorology

== See also ==
- National Indigenous Training Academy
