= Newhaven Wildlife Sanctuary =

Protected area in the Northern Territory, Australia

- IUCN category II (national park)
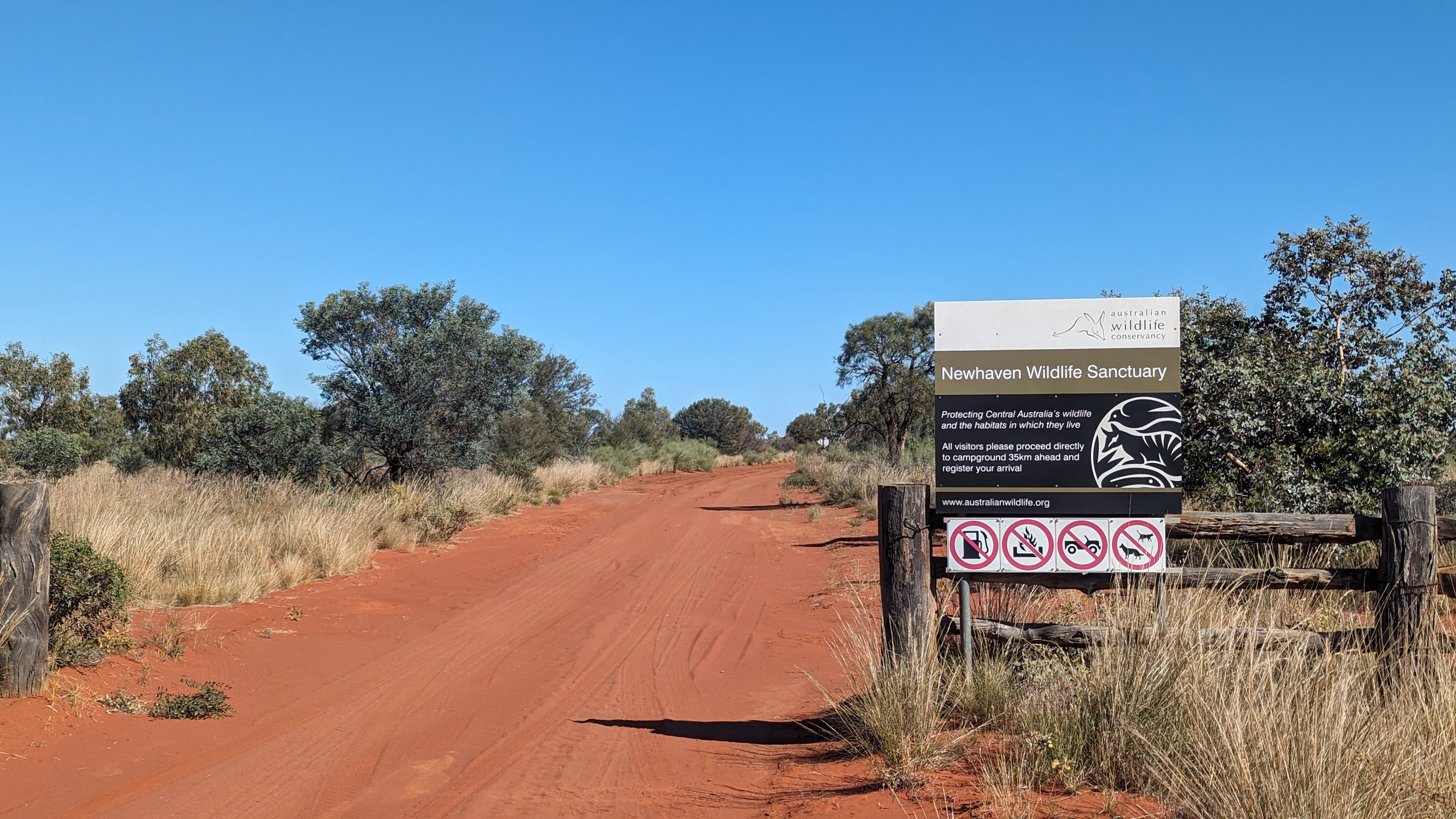

- Location within Northern Territory
- Location: Northern Territory, Lake Mackay
- Coordinates: 22°49′41″S 131°06′58″E
- Area: 2,615.01 km^{2} (1,009.66 sq mi)
- Governing body: Australian Wildlife Conservancy

Newhaven Wildlife Sanctuary, once a cattle station known as Newhaven Station, is an Australian nature reserve. It lies around 300–400 kilometres (186–249 mi) north-west of Alice Springs in the Northern Territory of Australia. It is jointly operated by Birds Australia and the Australian Wildlife Conservancy.

== History ==
Newhaven is surrounded by Aboriginal lands: Warlpiri, Luritja, and Anmatyerre people have a traditional association with the area. Aboriginal sacred sites have been identified on the property, including Yunkanjini (Lake Bennett).

Newhaven Station was established as a pastoral lease and cattle station in the Tanami Desert, Northern Territory. Alex Coppock took over the lease in 1959, with his wife naming it Newhaven. The Coppocks maintained only a subsistence stock of cattle on the property, which ensured the survival of various rare species of flora and fauna. After bringing Waler horses from his father's property Gibeanie on the Stuart Highway, they increased the stock, which retained genetic isolation from others in the country. Water supplied for the horses attracted other wildlife to the station.

Newhaven Station was purchased by Birds Australia for A$750,000 (which included funding of A$330,000 from the federal government via its National Reserve System) in December 2000 from Coppock. The horses were mostly rehomed elsewhere, although the original plan had been to deprive them of water and let them die.

In 2006, the Australian Wildlife Conservancy (AWC) became a partner with Birds Australia in co-managing the sanctuary.

In 2010, native title was granted to the Ngalia-Warlpiri and Luritja peoples.

The construction of the world's longest cat-proof fence was completed at Newhaven in April 2018, enclosing a 9,390-hectare (23,203-acre) predator-free area.

== Location and description ==
Newhaven is located around 300–400 kilometres (186–249 mi) north-west of Alice Springs, and 80 km (50 mi) from the Aboriginal community of Yuendumu. It lies in the bioregion of the Great Sandy Desert.

With an area of 2,615 square kilometres (1,010 sq mi), Newhaven is five times the size of Birds Australia's other reserve, Gluepot, in South Australia.

Newhaven's landforms include parallel dunes, salt lakes, claypans, plains and rocky hills. Vegetation includes grasslands, woodlands and shrublands, which can be subdivided into ten distinct vegetation communities, with over 600 species of plants recorded.

Several threatened species of birds and other animals have been recorded on Newhaven. These include the night parrot, grey falcon, princess parrot, striated grasswren, grey honeyeater, brush-tailed mulgara, black-flanked rock-wallaby, greater bilby, marsupial mole, and great desert skink.

== Governance ==
In December 2005 Birds Australia signed an agreement with AWC that saw AWC assume ownership and day-to-day financial responsibility for Newhaven, while allowing for Birds Australia to have long-term involvement in the management of the reserve, Birds Australia members to have access, and ensuring the conservation of the flora and fauna. From 2006, the two organisations became partners in managing the reserve. For many years, the original station owner, Alex Coppock, continued to act as guide and mentor to scientists working on the property.

Since 2007, it has been included in the locality of Lake Mackay.

== Species conservation ==
In August 2023, a joint team comprising AWC staff and Indigenous ranger women translocated 40 golden bandicoots from the Charnley River-Artesian Range Wildlife Sanctuary in northern WA to Newhaven, after previously carrying out a survey of the animals. These were joined by a further 60 of the vulnerable species from Barrow Island the following week.

In August 2024, 40 brushtail possums, believed to be locally extinct in the Red Centre, were translocated from Kangaroo Island in South Australia (where they are abundant) to Newhaven. The possums were welcomed by the Anmatyerr people in Laramba with a "Possum Dreaming" ceremony.

== See also ==
- Protected areas of the Northern Territory
