= Ayers Rock Airport =

Ayers Rock Airport Connellan Airport
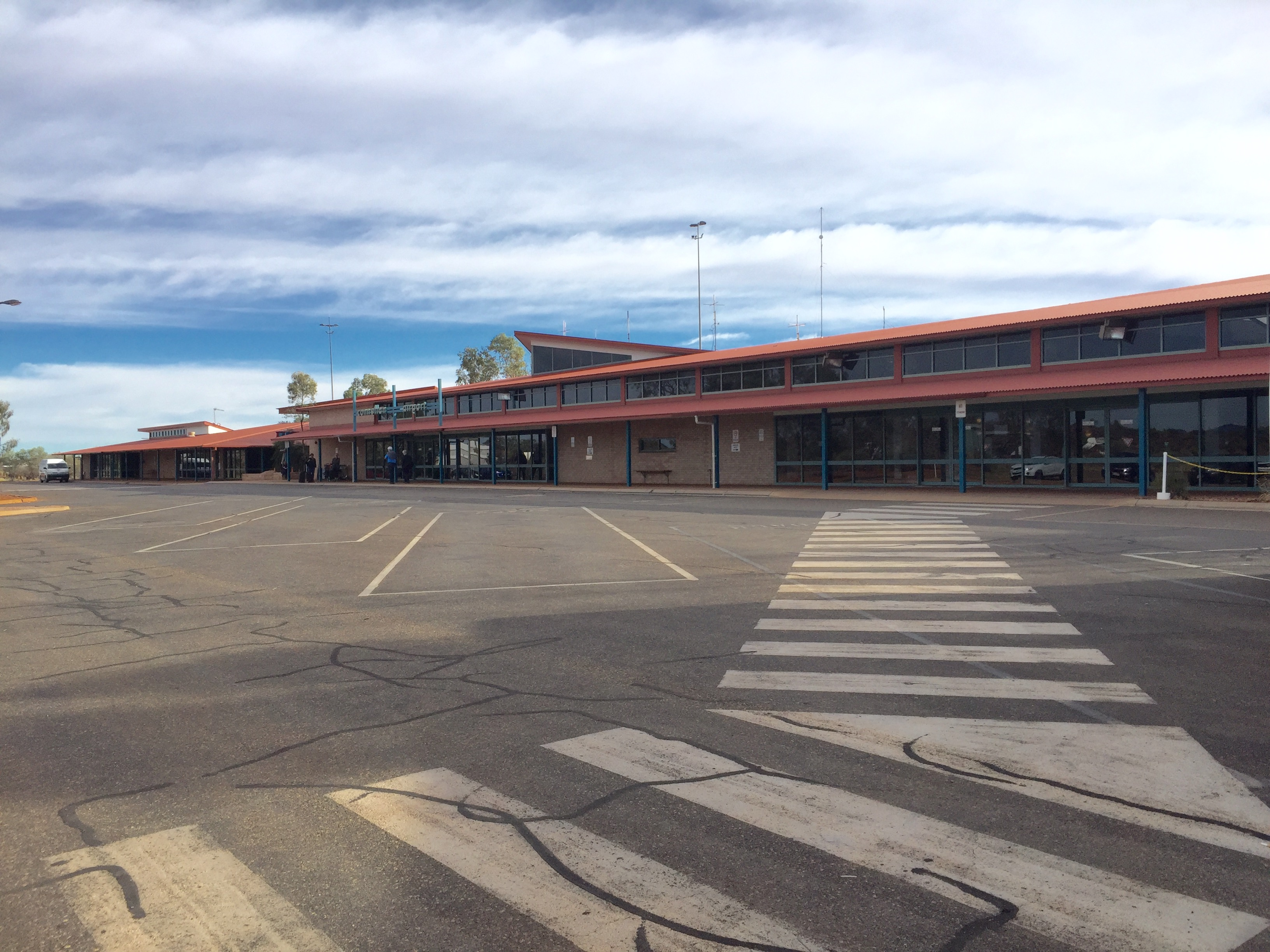
- IATA: AYQ; ICAO: YAYE

Summary
- Airport type: Public
- Operator: Voyages Indigenous Tourism Australia Pty Ltd
- Location: Yulara
- Elevation AMSL: 1,626 ft (496 m)
- Coordinates: 25°11′10″S 130°58′32″E

Maps
- Location in the Northern Territory
- Interactive map of Ayers Rock Airport

Runways
| Direction | Length | | Surface |
| Direction | m | ft | Surface |
|---|---|---|---|
| 13/31 | 2,599 | 8,527 | Asphalt |

Statistics (2024–25 (Note: Fiscal year 1 July – 30 June))
- Passengers: 345,228
- Aircraft movements: 2,899
- Sources: Australian AIP and aerodrome chart Passengers and movements from BITRE

Ayers Rock Airport (IATA: AYQ, ICAO: YAYE) (Pitjantjatjara: Iṟutuṟuma Uluṟu), also known as Connellan Airport, is a domestic airport in Northern Territory, Australia, serving Uluru / Ayers Rock. Situated in the north of Yulara, it is around 463 kilometres (288 mi) away from Alice Springs, and a 20-minute drive from Uluru itself.

== History ==
The original Connellan Airport at Uluru was provided by Edward Connellan, who founded Connellan Airways in 1942. The development of tourism infrastructure adjacent to the base of Uluru / Ayers Rock that began in the 1950s soon created adverse environmental impacts. It was decided in the early 1970s to remove all accommodation-related tourist facilities from near the base of Uluru / Ayers Rock and re-establish them outside the national park. In 1975, a reservation of 104 square kilometres (40 sq mi) of land beyond the national park's northern boundary, 15 kilometres (9.3 mi) from Uluru, was approved for the development of a tourist facility, to be known as Yulara, along with a new airport. The new facilities became fully operational in late 1984.

On 6 August 2000, an Ansett Australia Airbus A320 arrived from Auckland Airport in New Zealand, carrying the Olympic Torch for its inaugural Australian leg ahead of the Sydney Olympic Games. From there, the torch was taken for a run around Uluru / Ayers Rock, followed by a formal reception.

In March 2010, Virgin Blue announced that the airline would start flying to Uluru / Ayers Rock. Flights commenced from Sydney on 2 August 2010 operated by Embraer E-190s. In September 2020 Virgin Australia revealed it had dropped seven regional destinations with one of them being Uluru / Ayers Rock. On 6 June 2024, Virgin Australia restarted service from Melbourne. On 7 June 2024, Virgin Australia restarted service from Brisbane.

In February 2013, Qantas announced that Jetstar would take over Qantas' Sydney service in April 2013. Jetstar later launched flights from Melbourne Airport in June 2014 and Brisbane Airport in August 2018. In May 2021 Qantas announced the airline would resume flights to Sydney in March 2022. QantasLink also has flights from Cairns Airport.

== Facilities ==
Ayers Rock Airport has one main terminal for scheduled flights. The runway is 2,599 m × 30 m (8,527 ft × 98 ft). It has a simple, single stage lighting system and PAPI. The largest aircraft serving the airport are Boeing 737-800 jetliners operated by Qantas and Virgin Australia. Jetstar operates Airbus A320 jetliners on its flights to the airport.

Airservices Australia maintain a fire station with two trucks to provide Aviation Rescue Fire Fighting services at Ayers Rock Airport.

== Airlines and destinations ==
| Airlines | Destinations |
|---|---|
| Jetstar | Melbourne, Sydney |
| Qantas | Sydney |
| QantasLink | Cairns |

== Statistics ==
Ayers Rock Airport was ranked 26th in Australia for the number of revenue passengers served in financial year 2024–25.

Annual passenger and aircraft statistics for Ayers Rock
| Year | Revenue passengers | Aircraft movements |
|---|---|---|
| 2015–16 | 338,922 | 3,271 |
| 2016–17 | 364,818 | 3,309 |
| 2017–18 | 380,266 | 3,354 |
| 2018–19 | 456,851 | 3,871 |
| 2019–20 | 339,826 | 3,065 |
| 2020–21 | 68,438 | 676 |
| 2021–22 | 93,545 | 903 |
| 2022–23 | 245,743 | 1,953 |
| 2023–24 | 283,551 | 2,292 |
| 2024–25 | 345,228 | 2,899 |

== See also ==
- List of airports in the Northern Territory
