= Hale, Northern Territory =

Hale Northern Territory
- Coordinates: 24°16′19″S 134°44′58″E
- Population: 79 (2016 census)
  - Density: 0.003599/km^{2} (0.00932/sq mi)
- Established: 3 April 2007
- Postcode(s): 0872
- Area: 21,949.382 km^{2} (8,474.7 sq mi)
- Time zone: ACST (UTC+9:30)
- Location: 1,297 km (806 mi) S of Darwin City
- LGA(s): MacDonnell Region
- Territory electorate(s): Namatjira
- Federal division(s): Lingiari
- Footnotes: Adjoining localities

Hale is a locality in the Northern Territory of Australia located about 1,297 kilometres (806 mi) south of the territory capital of Darwin.

The locality’s boundaries and name were gazetted on 3 April 2007. It is named after the Hale River which is in turn named after Mathew Hale. It fully surrounds the Ltyentye Apurte Community. As of 2020, it has an area of 21,949.382 square kilometres (8,474.704 sq mi).

The 2016 Australian census which was conducted in August 2016 reports that Hale had 79 people living within its boundaries.

Hale is located within the federal division of Lingiari, the territory electoral division of Namatjira and the local government area of the MacDonnell Region.
