= Electoral division of Gwoja =

Electoral division of the Northern Territory, Australia

Gwoja Northern Territory—Legislative Assembly
- Interactive map of boundaries as of the 2024 election
- Territory: Northern Territory
- Created: 2020
- MP: Chansey Paech
- Party: Labor
- Namesake: Gwoya Tjungurrayi
- Electors: 6,113 (2026)
- Area: 427,605 km^{2} (165,099.2 sq mi)
- Demographic: Remote
Electorates around Gwoja:
Timor Sea	Daly	Barkly
Kimberley (WA)	Gwoja	Barkly; Namatjira
North West Central (WA)	Giles (SA)	Giles (SA)

Gwoja is an electoral division of the Northern Territory Legislative Assembly in Australia. It was created in a 2019 redistribution for the 2020 general election, replacing the electoral division of Stuart. It stretches from the Timor Sea in the north to the border with South Australia in the south, being the sole Northern Territory Legislative Assembly division to border Western Australia. There were 6,113 people enrolled within the electorate as of July 2026.

The division is named after Gwoya Tjungurrayi, a Walpiri-Anmatyerre man who survived the Coniston massacre in 1928, and became the first Aboriginal person to have his likeness on an Australian postage stamp. His likeness was also the inspiration for the Aboriginal elder depicted on the reverse of the Australian two-dollar coin.

When the seat was first contested in 2020, it was won by incumbent Namatjira Labor MLA Chansey Paech, who transferred here after his seat was made a notional Country Liberal Party (CLP) seat in the redistribution.

== Members for Gwoja ==
Member	Party	Term
Chansey Paech	Labor	2020–present

== Election results ==
2024 Northern Territory general election: Gwoja
Party	Candidate	Votes	%	±%
Labor	Chansey Paech	1,654	65.8	+5.9
Country Liberal	Jarrod Jupurula Williams	858	34.2	+7.9
Total formal votes		2,512	97.4	+2.6
Informal votes		68	2.6	−2.6
Turnout		2,580	42.1	
Labor hold		Swing	+1.1	
