= Electoral division of Namatjira =

Coordinates: 23°13′S 131°54′E

Namatjira Northern Territory—Legislative Assembly
- Interactive map of boundaries
- Territory: Northern Territory
- Created: 2012
- MP: Bill Yan
- Party: Country Liberal
- Namesake: Albert Namatjira
- Electors: 6,665 (2026)
- Area: 198,384 km^{2} (76,596.5 sq mi)
- Demographic: Remote
Electorates around Namatjira:
Gwoja	Barkly	Gregory (QLD)
Gwoja	Namatjira	Gregory (QLD)
Stuart (SA)	Stuart (SA)	Stuart (SA)

Namatjira is an electoral division of the Legislative Assembly in Australia's Northern Territory. It was created in 2012 when the former division of MacDonnell was renamed after the Aboriginal artist Albert Namatjira. Namatjira is an almost entirely rural electorate, covering 198,384 km^{2}, and taking in the resort town of Yulara, the remote communities of Hermannsburg, Kintore and Papunya, and part of southern Alice Springs. There were 6,665 electors enrolled in Namatjira as of July 2026.

The seat's first member, Alison Anderson, the former Labor-turned-independent-turned-Country Liberal (CLP) member for MacDonnell, won the seat handily at the 2012 Territory election amid a large swing to the CLP in the remote portions of the Territory. Anderson left the CLP in 2014, and briefly served as Territory leader of the Palmer United Party before serving out the rest of her term as an independent.

Anderson did not contest the 2016 election. Despite her previously fraught relations with Labor, she endorsed the Labor candidate in the seat, Alice Springs councillor Chansey Paech. Although a redistribution seemingly consolidated the CLP majority in the seat by pushing it into Alice Springs, most commentators believed Anderson's endorsement, combined with the CLP's lackluster polling numbers, made Namatjira a likely Labor gain. Paech took the seat on a swing of over 29 percent—large albeit not the largest at the election—amid Labor's landslide victory that year. However, a redistribution erased Paech's majority and made Namatjira notionally a marginal CLP seat. Paech switched to the neighbouring seat of Gwoja (formerly Stuart) at the 2020 election, and the CLP candidate Bill Yan regained the seat for his party.

== Members for Namatjira ==
Member	Party	Term
Alison Anderson	Country Liberal	2012–2014
Alison Anderson	Independent	2014
Alison Anderson	Palmer United	2014
Alison Anderson	Independent	2014–2016
Chansey Paech	Labor	2016–2020
Bill Yan	Country Liberal	2020–present

== Election results ==
2024 Northern Territory general election: Namatjira
Party	Candidate	Votes	%	±%
Country Liberal	Bill Yan	1,896	55.1	+25.5
Labor	Sheralee Taylor	874	25.4	−1.7
Greens	Blair McFarland	671	19.5	+11.8
Total formal votes		3,441	95.7	+0.5
Informal votes		154	4.3	−0.5
Turnout		3,595	55.2	
Two-party-preferred result
Country Liberal	Bill Yan	2,115	61.5	+11.2
Labor	Sheralee Taylor	1,326	38.5	−11.2
Country Liberal hold		Swing	+11.8	
