= MacDonnell Region =

MacDonnell Regional Council
- Local government area
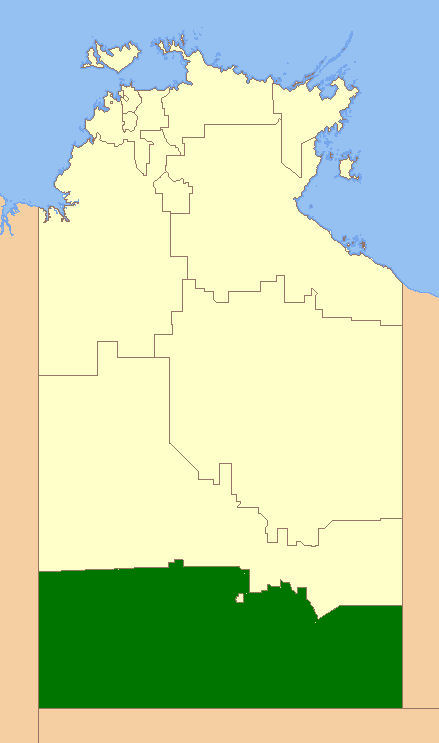

- Interactive map of MacDonnell Regional Council
- Coordinates: 26.5931°S 118.4911°E
- Country: Australia
- State: Northern Territory
- Region: Alice Springs Region
- Established: 2008
- Council seat: Alice Springs (not part of council)

Government
  - President: Roxanne Kenny (Macdonnell Regional Council)
  - Territory electorates: Namatjira; Stuart
  - Federal division: Lingiari

Population
  - Total: 6,863 (2018)
- Website: MacDonnell Regional Council
LGAs around MacDonnell Regional Council
Halls Creek	Central Desert	Boulia
Halls Creek	MacDonnell Regional Council	Diamantina
East Pilbara	Pastoral Unincorporated Area	Pastoral Unincorporated Area

The MacDonnell Regional Council is a local government area of the Northern Territory, Australia. The region covers an area of 268,329 square kilometres (103,602 square miles) and had an estimated population of 6,863 people in June 2018.

== Geography ==
MacDonnell Regional Council occupies the south of the Northern Territory and is the only LGA that borders with South Australia, specifically with Anangu Pitjantjatjara Yankunytjatjara in the southwest and the Pastoral Unincorporated Area in the southeast.

Alice Springs and Yulara are enclaves within the LGA.

== History ==
In October 2006 the Northern Territory Government announced the reform of local government areas. The intention of the reform was to improve and expand the delivery of services to towns and communities across the Northern Territory by establishing eleven new shires. The MacDonnell Shire Council was created on 1 July 2008, as were the remaining ten shires. Elections of shire councillors were held on 25 October 2008.

Community Government Councils merged into the MacDonnell Shire, as did a large area of unincorporated area. The existing Community Government Councils and one regional council were:

- Amoonguna Community Incorporated
- Aputula Housing Association Incorporated
- Areyonga Community Incorporated
- Ikuntji Community Council Incorporated
- Imanpa Community Incorporated
- Kaltukatjara Community Council Aboriginal Corporation
- Ntaria Council Incorporated
- Papunya Community Council Incorporated
- Walungurru Council Aboriginal Corporation
- Wallace Rockhole Community Government Council
- Ltyentye Apurte Community Government Council
- Tapatjatjaka Community Government Council
- Watiyawanu Community Government Council

On 1 January 2014, the council was renamed MacDonnell Region.

== Governance ==
The current president (mayor) of the MacDonnell Regional Council is Roxanne Kenny.

== Wards ==
The MacDonnell Regional Council is divided into 4 wards, which are governed by 12 councillors:

- Rodinga (4)
- Ljirapinta (2)
- Luritja Pintubi (4)
- Iyarrka (3)

== Towns by ward ==
The following towns fall within the four wards as follows:, with population figures as of 30 June 2007:

- Iyarrka
  - Kaltukatjara (Docker River) (311)
  - Imanpa (217)
  - Areyonga (Utju) (245)
- Ljirapinta
  - Hermannsburg (Ntaria) (600)
  - Wallace Rockhole (Ulana) (107)
- Luritja Pintubi
  - Haasts Bluff (Ikuntji) (165)
  - Kintore (Walungurru) (350)
  - Mount Liebig (Watijawanu) (252)
  - Papunya (Warumpi) (342)
- Rodinga
  - Amoonguna (362)
  - Aputula (Finke) (240)
  - Ltyentye Apurte (Santa Teresa) (652 in 2006)
  - Titjikala (Tapatjatjaka) (265)

== Outstations ==
There are a number of small family outstations within MacDonnell Regional Council. These include:

- Labrapuntja (population 11 in 2020)
