= Eileen Napaltjarri =

Australian artist (born 1956)

- Born: 1956; Haasts Bluff, Northern Territory, Australia
- Known for: Painting

Eileen Napaltjarri (born 1956) is a Pintupi-speaking Aboriginal Australian artist from Australia's Western Desert region. Eileen Napaltjarri, also known as Anyima Napaltjarri, began painting for Papunya Tula artists' cooperative in 1996. She was named as one of Australian Art Collector magazine's 50 Most Collectible artists in 2008; her works are held by the National Gallery of Australia and the Art Gallery of New South Wales.

== Life ==
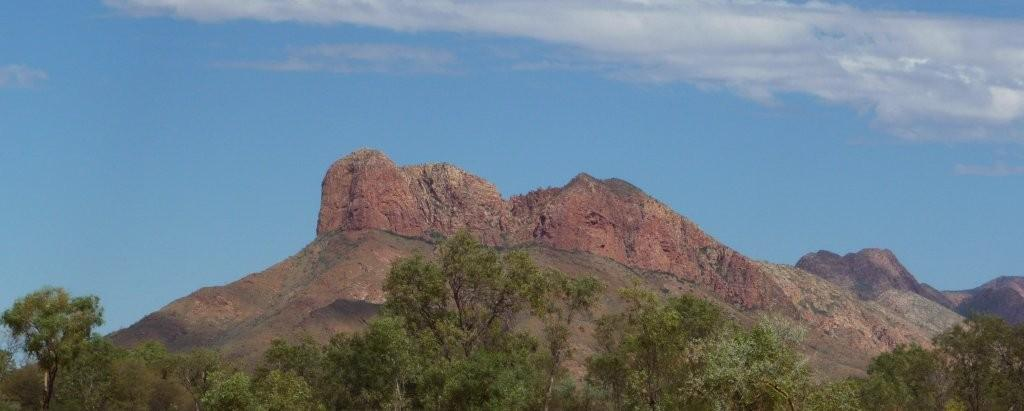
Haasts Bluff, where Napaltjarri was born

Born at Haasts Bluff, Northern Territory in 1956, daughter of Charlie Tarawa Tjungurrayi (aka Charlie Tararu Tjungurayi), one of the founding members of Papunya Tula Artists, and Tatali Nangala, Eileen was the only one of seven siblings to follow her parents' advice and take up painting. She was reportedly the only one still alive by 2008. (Note: 'Napaljarri' (in Warlpiri) or 'Napaltjarri' (in Western Desert dialects) is a skin name, one of sixteen used to denote the subsections or subgroups in the kinship system of central Australian indigenous people. These names define kinship relationships that influence preferred marriage partners and may be associated with particular totems. Although they may be used as terms of address, they are not surnames in the sense used by Europeans. Thus 'Eileen' is the element of the artist's name that is specifically hers.)

== Marriage discrepancies ==
In 2008, researcher Vivien Johnson reported that she married Puuna Tjakamarra, and had two children, William Tjupurrula and Sharon Napurrula, as well as an adopted son, Jeffrey. However, journalist Nicolas Rothwell in 2006 stated that Napaltjarri's husband was named Kenny Williams Tjampitjinpa.

== Art ==
=== Background ===
Contemporary indigenous art of the western desert began in 1971 when indigenous men at Papunya created murals and canvases using western art materials, assisted by teacher Geoffrey Bardon. Their work, which used acrylic paints to create designs representing body painting and ground sculptures, rapidly spread across indigenous communities of central Australia, particularly following the commencement of a government-sanctioned art program in central Australia in 1983. By the 1980s and 1990s, such work was being exhibited internationally. The first artists, including all of the founders of the Papunya Tula artists' company, had been men, and there was resistance amongst the Pintupi men of central Australia to women painting. However, there was also a desire amongst many of the women to participate, and in the 1990s large numbers of them began to create paintings. In the western desert communities such as Kintore, Yuendumu, Balgo, and on the outstations, people were beginning to create art works expressly for exhibition and sale.

=== Career ===
She first began painting in 1996, aged 40, for Papunya Tula, of which her father had been one of the founders in the early 1970s. Sources differ on when her work for Papunya Tula became regular, with Gallery Gabrielle Pizzi placing this at 1999, while Vivien Johnson, in her survey Lives of the Papunya Tula Artists, suggests 2002. As of 2010, Napaltjarri had held two solo exhibitions, the second at Utopia Art Sydney.

Napaltjarri won the "emerging artist" category of the Redlands Westpac Art Prize in 2005. In 2006, journalist and writer Nicolas Rothwell named her as the successor to Papunya Tula's most significant founding women: Makinti Napanangka, Wintjiya Napaltjarri and Tjunkiya Napaltjarri. Australian Art Collector magazine, in its annual survey of Australian art, included Napaltjarri in its 50 Most Collectable Artists for 2008. Works by Napaltjarri are held by the Art Gallery of New Wales, and the National Gallery of Australia.

Napaltjarri paints sites associated with both her mother's country around Kintore, Northern Territory, and her father's country, Tjitururrnga (or Tjiturrulpa), to the west of Kintore.

== Collections ==
- National Gallery of Australia
- Art Gallery of New South Wales
