= Molly Jugadai Napaltjarri =

Australian artist (c. 1954–2011)

- Born: c.1954 Haasts Bluff, Northern Territory, Australia
- Died: 2011 (aged 56–57); Alice Springs
- Known for: Painting

Molly Jugadai Napaltjarri (c.1954–2011) was a Pintupi- and Luritja-speaking Aboriginal artist from Australia's Western Desert region. Her paintings are held in major collections, including the National Gallery of Australia.

== Life ==
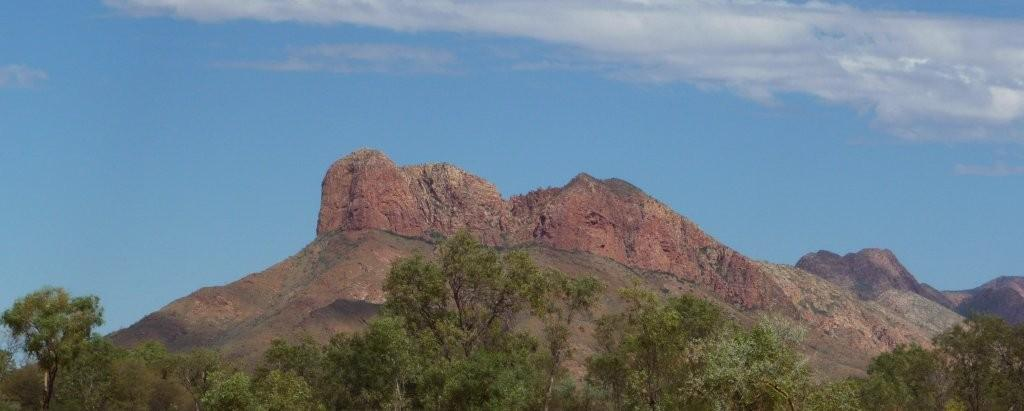
Haasts Bluff, where Molly Jugadai was born.

Molly Jugadai was born around 1954 at Haasts Bluff, Northern Territory, eldest daughter of artists Narputta Nangala and Timmy Jugadai Tjungurrayi. The ambiguity around the year of birth is in part because Aboriginal peoples of Australia operate using a different conception of time, often estimating dates through comparisons with the occurrence of other events. She had a younger sister, artist Daisy Jugadai Napaltjarri, who died in 2008.

Napaljarri (in Warlpiri) or Napaltjarri (in Western Desert dialects) is a skin name, one of sixteen used to denote the subsections or subgroups in the kinship system of central Australian Aboriginal peoples. These names define kinship relationships that influence preferred marriage partners and may be associated with particular totems. Although they may be used as terms of address, they are not surnames in the sense used by Europeans. Thus "Molly Jugadai" is the element of the artist's name that is specifically hers.

She died in 2011 in Alice Springs.

== Art ==
=== Background ===
Contemporary Indigenous art of the western desert began when Aboriginal men at Papunya began painting in 1971, assisted by teacher Geoffrey Bardon. Their work, which used acrylic paints to create designs representing body painting and ground sculptures, rapidly spread across Indigenous communities of central Australia, particularly following the commencement of a government-sanctioned art program in central Australia in 1983. By the 1980s and 1990s, such work was being exhibited internationally. The first artists, including all of the founders of the Papunya Tula artists' company, had been men, and there was resistance amongst the Pintupi men of central Australia to women painting. However, there was also a desire amongst many of the women to participate, and in the 1990s large numbers of them began to create paintings. In the western desert communities such as Kintore, Yuendumu, Balgo, and on the outstations, people were beginning to create art works expressly for exhibition and sale.

=== Career ===
Western Desert artists such as Molly frequently paint particular Dreamings, or stories, for which they have personal responsibility or rights. Molly's dreamings relate to the seven Napaljarri sisters, and Kaarkurutintya (Lake Macdonald).

Molly participated in a group exhibition at Michael Eather's Fire-Works Gallery, and a solo exhibition at Sydney's Hogarth Gallery, both in 2004. She subsequently participated in numerous group and solo shows. One of her paintings appeared as the cover art for the 2005 monograph ‘Peopling’ the Cleland Hills: Aboriginal history in western Central Australia, 1850–1980.

Molly played a significant role in the establishment of the Ikuntji Artists Aboriginal Corporation, set up in the mid-1990s with the assistance of Marina Strocchi, and she is represented by Ikuntji.
