= Papunya Literature Production Centre =

Australian publisher

Papunya Literature Production Centre, sometimes referred to as Papunya Literacy Production Centre was a Pintupi-Luritja language publisher based in Papunya (Warumpi) in the Northern Territory of Australia.

It operated between 1978 and 1990 and employed numerous writers, artists and literacy workers to create approximately 350 books to assist in the bilingual language program at Papunya School. The centre also produced Tjakulpa kuwarritja; a monthly newspaper for the community.

In 2024 the work of the centre is being celebrated through the Wangka Walytja exhibition which was first shown of the University of Queensland and begun travelling nationally in 2025. Associated with this exhibition is the publication Wangka Walytja: the life and times of the Papunya Literature Production Centre (2026). The exhibition Wangka Wakaṉutja: The Story of the Papunya Literature Production Centre opened at the National Library of Australia in April 2026.

== Background ==
The Papunya Literature Production Centre was one of approximately 10 centres, called Bilingual Resource Development Units (BRDU), which were funded by the Northern Territory Government in schools across the Northern Territory. These units were generally equipped with a non-Indigenous literacy production supervisor, two local literacy workers and a teacher-linguist who often served multiple communities. The first teacher-linguist employed for the project at Papunya was John Heffernan who also worked with the communities at Haasts Bluff, Kintore and outlying outstations.

Aboriginal staff working on the program were also supported to learn further and train further in linguistics and educations through programs at the School of Australian Linguistics and Batchelor Institute of Indigenous Tertiary Education.

When the Papunya Literature Production Centre first begun they were strongly inspired by the works of Obed Raggett, an author and educator who had worked closely alongside Geoffrey Bardon, and who helped found the Western Desert Art Movement. The publication of The Stories of Obed Raggett by the centre in 1980 was the first and only that the centre published for a general audience and following Ragetts death in 1980 he served as an inspiration for those who came after.

Other major contributors to centre were;

- Sabrina Ferguson Nakamarra
- Kuḻaṯa (Dennis Nelson) Tjakamarra
- Kevin Morris Tjapaltjarri
- Douglas Multa Tjupurrula (son of Johnny Warangkula Tjupurrula)
- Charlotte Phillipus Napurrula (the daughter of Long Jack Phillipus Tjakamarra)
- Thomas Stevens Tjapangati
- Abraham Stockman Tjungarrayi

Many of the books produced by the centre told 'old time stories' from the community, stories about plants and animals as well as the story of their first contact with white (European) Australians.

The Papunya Literature Production Centre ceased in the 1990s and in 2009 the archives of the centre were found in an old classroom at Papunya School and work began to protect them and share them again with the community. Work done by sociologist Vivien Johnson, who had already written significant amounts about Papunya, alongside linguists Samantha Dispray and Charlotte Phillipus Napurrula resulted in the exhibition and subsequent book Wangka Walytja: the life and times of the Papunya Literature Production Centre (2026). Wangka Walytja is a Pintupi-Luritja phrase meaning ‘our language, our culture’.

As a part of this revitalisation the project has also created a series of animations and documentaries with the younger generation at Papunya.
