= Pansy Napangardi =

Australian artist

Pansy Napangardi (born 1948) is an Australian artist. She is associated with the Jukurrpa group of women artists in Alice Springs where she lives today.

== Early life ==
She was born at Haasts Bluff, Northern Territory, Australia. She remains one of the leading artists of Papunya Tula, after she was moved to the settlement of Papunya in the early 1960s after Haasts Bluff became abandoned due to lack of suitable water; it was here where she observed the work of many artists.

== Career ==
Napangardi was the first professional female desert painter amidst the Luritija and Warlpiri people, learning techniques from the desert art founders. Learning from the renowned Indigenous Australian artists, Johny Warangula and Kaapa, she began to develop her own technique through the application of multi-coloured dots. Although she observed the men's painting business there, she is one of the rare women associated with Papunya Tula who did not serve an apprenticeship with the men. In 1983, Napangardi commenced her work with Papunya Tula Artists and by the late 1980s, had established herself as a leading female artist. She sold her works independently in Alice Springs at first and in 1989 she won the National Aboriginal & Torres Strait Islander Art Award.

== Collections ==
- Art Gallery of New South Wales
- the Hood Museum of Art at Dartmouth College,
- Artbank, Sydney.
- Central Collection, Australian National University, Canberra.
- Donald Kahn collection, Lowe Art Museum, University of Miami.
- Museum and Art Gallery of the Northern Territory, Darwin.
- National Gallery of Australia, Canberra.
- National Gallery of Victoria, Melbourne.
- The Kelton Foundation, Santa Monica, U.S.A
- The Queensland Art Gallery, Brisbane.
- The Robert Holmes a Court Collection, Perth.

== Individual exhibitions ==
- 1988, Sydney Opera House
- 1989, Gallery Gabrielle Pizzi, Melbourne
- 1991, Gallery Gabrielle Pizzi, Melbourne
