= Bill Whiskey Tjapaltjarri =

Australian Pitjantjatjara artist (c. 1920–2008)

Bill Whiskey Tjapaltjarri, (circa 1920–2008) was an Pitjantjatjara artist from Central Australia who started painting on canvas when he was 85 years old. He painted from his adopted home of Mount Liebig and soon became internationally successful. As well as being an artist Whiskey was a ngangkari.

== Life and painting ==
Whiskey was born in Pitjantjatjara country at Pirupa Akla, about 130 km south of Kata Tjuta to a family of traditional nomadic hunters and gatherers. Whiskey did not encounter a white person until he was in his teenage years, and by then his father and many of his family had died and those remaining moved on to the Lutheran mission at Haasts Bluff.

At Haasts Bluff Whiskey met and married Colleen Nampitjinpa, a Luritja woman (also a ngangkari), and they had 5 children together, following working for rations as a labourer at Areyonga, the family eventually settled in Mount Liebig in the 1980s. It was here that Whiskey got his European name as people started calling him "Whiskers", for his long white beard and his wry humour and this name evolved into "Whiskey".

Mount Liebig is about 80 km from Papunya so, from its earliest days, Whiskey was aware of the Western Desert Art Movement and attended the opening of the Ikuntji Art Centre (which was established with the help of Marina Strocchi) where his wife was involved.

Despite this, Whiskey did not start painting until he was 85 years old, in December 2005, when he "walked into the art centre as requested some canvas for himself". He went on the paint for the Watiyawanu Artists of Amunturrngu Cooperative. This late start was not unexpected as Pitjantjatjara people were some of the last to embrace painting as an art form, being concerned about their sacred dreaming stories being on public display and being available for public sale.

Whiskey's paintings subjects covered his early nomadic lifestyle and a mythic battle related to Cockatoo Dreaming (that had occurred at his birthplace) and show his deep traditional knowledge. In their execution, they are bold and bright.

Shortly before his death in 2008, Whiskey had a sell-out exhibition in London where six of his artworks sold for more than AU $250,000.

Whiskey is represented important private and public collections and he has exhibited in London, Japan, Milan and throughout Australia. He was also a finalist in the Telstra Aboriginal and Torres Strait Islander Art Awards in 2008.

== See also ==
- Art of Australia
