= Wintjiya Napaltjarri =

Australian artist (died 2014)

- Born: c. 1923–1934; North-west of Kintore, Northern Territory, Australia
- Died: 2014 (aged 79–91); Walungurru, Northern Territory, Australia
- Known for: Painting
- Awards: Finalist, National Aboriginal & Torres Strait Islander Art Award: 2007, 2008

Wintjiya Napaltjarri (also spelt Wentjiya, Wintjia or Wentja; born c. 1923–1934; died 2014), also known as Wintjia Napaltjarri No. 1, was an Indigenous Australian artist from the Western Desert region. She was the sister of artist Tjunkiya Napaltjarri; both were wives of Toba Tjakamarra, with whom Wintjiya had five children.

Wintjiya's involvement in contemporary Indigenous Australian art began in 1994 at Haasts Bluff, when she participated in a group painting project and in the creation of batik fabrics. She was also a printmaker, using drypoint etching. Her paintings typically use an iconography that represents the eggs of the flying ant (waturnuma) and hair-string skirts (nyimparra). Her palette generally involves strong red or black against a white background.

A finalist in the 2007 and 2008 National Aboriginal & Torres Strait Islander Art Awards, Wintjiya's work is held in several of Australia's public collections including the Art Gallery of New South Wales, the Museum and Art Gallery of the Northern Territory, the National Gallery of Australia and the National Gallery of Victoria. Her work is also held in the Kluge-Ruhe Aboriginal Art Collection of the University of Virginia.

== Life ==
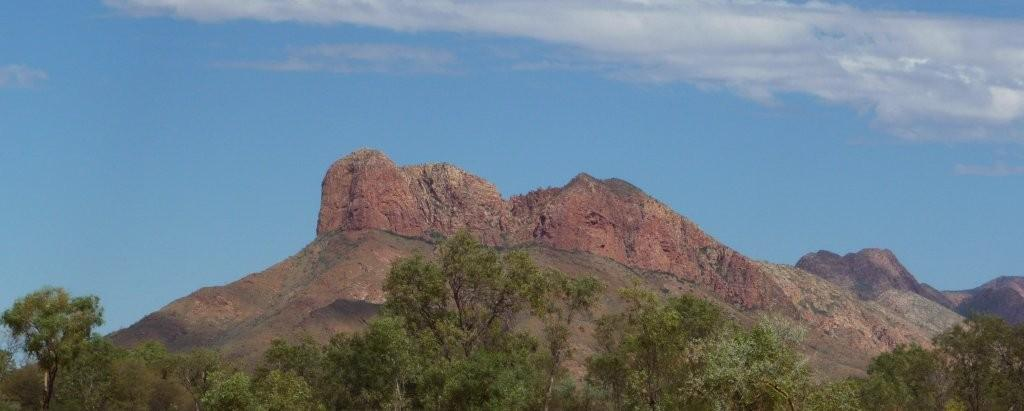
Haasts Bluff, where Wintjiya's family first settled after she was born, and where she began painting

A 2004 reference work on Western Desert painters suggests Wintjiya was born in about 1923; the Art Gallery of New South Wales suggests 1932; expert Vivien Johnson reports two possible years: 1932 or 1934. The ambiguity around the year of birth is in part because Indigenous Australians have a different conception of time, often estimating dates by comparisons with the occurrence of other events.

Napaljarri (in Warlpiri) or Napaltjarri (in Western Desert dialects) is a skin name, one of sixteen used to denote the subsections or subgroups in the kinship system of central Australian Indigenous people. These names define kinship relationships that influence preferred marriage partners and may be associated with particular totems. Although often used as terms of address, they are not surnames in the sense used by Europeans. Thus Wintjiya is the element of the artist's name that is specifically hers. She is sometimes referred to as Wintjia Napaltjarri No. 1; there is another artist from the same region, Wintjiya Morgan Napaljarri (also called Wintjiya Reid Napaltjarri), who is known as Wintjiya No. 2.

Wintjiya came from an area north-west or north-east of Walungurru (the Pintupi-language name for Kintore, Northern Territory). Johnson reports that Wintjiya was born at Mulparingya, "a swamp and spring to the northeast of Kintore", west of Alice Springs. As was the case for a number of artists from the region, Wintjiya's family walked into the Haasts Bluff settlement in the 1950s, moving to Papunya in the 1960s. In 1981, Kintore was established and the family moved there. Her native language was Pintupi, and she spoke almost no English. She was the sister of artist Tjunkiya Napaltjarri, the two women being the second and third wives of Toba Tjakamarra, father (by his first wife, Nganyima Napaltjarri) of one of the prominent founders of the Papunya Tula art movement, Turkey Tolson Tjupurrula. Wintjiya and Toba had five children: sons Bundy (born 1953) and Lindsay (born 1961 and now deceased); and daughters Rubilee (born 1955), Claire (born 1958) and Eileen (born 1960). Superficially frail by 2008, she nevertheless had the stamina and agility to teach her granddaughter the skills of chasing and capturing goannas.

Napaltjarri died in Walungurru in 2014.

== Art ==
=== Background ===
A 2006 untitled work by Wintjiya, showing her characteristic palette (stark white with red or black) and iconography (symbols representing the eggs of the flying ant (waturnuma) and hair-string skirts (nyimparra)

Contemporary Indigenous art of the western desert began in 1971 when Indigenous men at Papunya created murals and canvases using western art materials, assisted by teacher Geoffrey Bardon. Their work, which used acrylic paints to create designs representing body painting and ground sculptures, rapidly spread across Indigenous communities of central Australia, particularly after the introduction of a government-sanctioned art program in central Australia in 1983. By the 1980s and '90s, such work was being exhibited internationally. The first artists, including all of the founders of the Papunya Tula artists' company, were men, and there was resistance among the Pintupi men of central Australia to women also painting. However, many of the women wished to participate, and in the 1990s many of them began to paint. In the western desert communities such as Kintore, Yuendumu, Balgo, and on the outstations, people were beginning to create art works expressly for exhibition and sale.

=== Career ===
From the 1970s Napaltjarri created artefacts such as ininti seed necklaces, mats and baskets, using traditional artistic techniques including weaving of spinifex grass. When the women of Kintore, including sisters Wintjiya and Tjunkiya, started creating canvasses, their works bore little resemblance to those of their male peers (who had been painting for some years). Wintjiya's first efforts were collaborative, as one of a group of women who created murals on the Kintore Women's Centre walls in 1992. She then joined a painting camp with other women from Kintore and Haasts Bluff to produce "a series of very large collaborative canvases of the group's shared Dreamings" (dreamings are stories used to pass "important knowledge, cultural values and belief systems" from generation to generation). Twenty-five women were involved in planning the works, which included three canvases that were 3 metres (9.8 ft) square, as well as two that were 3 by 1.5 metres (9.8 by 4.9 ft); Tjunkiya and Wintjiya performed a ceremonial dance as part of the preparations. Wintjiya and her sister were determined to participate in the project despite cataracts interfering with their vision. As was the case for Makinti Napanangka, an operation to remove cataracts resulted in a new brightness to Wintjiya's compositions. Sources differ on when Wintjiya and her sister Tjunkiya had their cataracts removed: Johnson suggests 1999, but art centre coordinator Marina Strocchi, who worked closely with the women, states that it was 1994. In the early 2000s Wintjiya and her sister painted at Kintore, but in 2008 they were working from their home: "the widows' camp outside her 'son' Turkey Tolson's former residence".

Tjunkiya and her sister Wintjiya did not confine their activities to painting canvases. In 2001 the National Gallery of Victoria purchased a collaborative batik, created by the sisters in cooperation with several other artists, together with one completed by Wintjiya alone. These works were the product of a batik workshop run for the women of Haasts Bluff by Northern Territory Education Department staff Jill Squires and Therese Honan in the months following June 1994. The works, including several by Wintjiya, were not completed until 1995. Circular markings, used by Wintjiya in both these batiks and her subsequent paintings, represent the eggs of the flying ant (waturnuma), one of the main subjects of her art. She also portrays "tree-like organic motifs" and representations of hair-string skirts (nyimparra). The sisters also gained experience with drypoint etching; works produced by Wintjiya in 2004 – Watiyawanu and Nyimpara – are held by the National Gallery of Australia.

Wintjiya's work was included in a survey of the history of Papunya Tula painting hosted by Flinders University in the late 1990s. Reviewing the exhibition, Christine Nicholls remarked of Wintjiya's Watanuma that it was a germinal painting, with fine use of muted colour, and showed sensitivity to the relationships between objects and spaces represented in the work. Likewise, Marina Strocchi has noted the contrast between some of the subtle colours used in batik and Wintjiya's characteristic painting palette, which is "almost exclusively stark white with black or red". Hetti Perkins and Margie West have suggested that in paintings by Kintore women artists such as Wintjiya and Tjunkiya, "the viscosity of the painting's surface seems to mimic the generous application of body paint in women's ceremonies".

Wintjiya's painting Rock holes west of Kintore was a finalist in the 2007 National Aboriginal & Torres Strait Islander Art Award. Another of her works, Country west of Kintore, was accepted as a finalist in 2008. Works by Wintjiya have appeared in many significant exhibitions including: Papunya Women group exhibition (Utopia Art Gallery, Sydney, 1996); Raiki Wara: Long Cloth from Aboriginal Australia and the Torres Strait (National Gallery of Victoria 1998–99); Twenty-five Years and Beyond: Papunya Tula Painting (Flinders University Art Museum, 1999); Papunya Tula: Genesis and Genius (Art Gallery of New South Wales, 2000) and Land Marks (National Gallery of Victoria, 2006). Her first solo exhibition was at Woolloongabba Art Gallery in Brisbane in 2005, while in 2010 there was one at a Melbourne gallery. Also in 2010, a print by Wintjiya was selected for inclusion in the annual Fremantle Arts Centre's Print Award. In 2013, she was one of sixteen finalists in the Western Australian Indigenous Art Awards.

Works by Wintjiya are held in major private collections such as Nangara (also known as the Ebes Collection). Her work has been acquired by several major public art institutions including the Art Gallery of New South Wales, the Museum and Art Gallery of the Northern Territory, and the National Gallery of Victoria. Internationally, her work is held in the Aboriginal Art Museum at Utrecht in the Netherlands, and the Kluge-Ruhe Aboriginal Art Collection at the University of Virginia. Works by Wintjiya and her sister Tjunkiya are traded in the auction market, fetching prices of a few thousand dollars.

In 2018 Wintjiya's work was included in the exhibition Marking the Infinite: Contemporary Women Artists from Aboriginal Australia at The Phillips Collection.

== Collections ==
- Art Gallery of New South Wales
- Artbank
- Museum and Art Gallery of the Northern Territory
- National Gallery of Australia
- National Gallery of Victoria
- Supreme Court of the Northern Territory
- Kluge-Ruhe Aboriginal Art Collection, University of Virginia

== Awards ==
- 2007 – finalist, 24th National Aboriginal & Torres Strait Islander Art Award
- 2008 – finalist, 25th National Aboriginal & Torres Strait Islander Art Award
