= Tjakamarra =

Tjakamarra is a surname. Notable people with the surname include:

- Anatjari Tjakamarra (1930–1992), Australian artist
- Freddy West Tjakamarra (1932–1994), Australian artist
- Long Jack Phillipus Tjakamarra (1932–2020), Australian artist
