= Daisy Jugadai Napaltjarri =

Australian artist (c. 1955–2008)

- Born: c. 1955; Haasts Bluff, Northern Territory, Australia
- Died: 2008 (aged 52–53)
- Known for: Painting
- Awards: Finalist, National Aboriginal & Torres Strait Islander Art Award: 1995, 1998, 2001; Section winner, NATSIAA: 2000

Daisy Jugadai Napaltjarri (c. 1955 – 2008) was a Pintupi-Luritja-speaking Indigenous artist from Australia's Western Desert region, and sister of artist Molly Jugadai Napaltjarri. Daisy Jugadai lived and painted at Haasts Bluff, Northern Territory. There she played a significant role in the establishment of Ikuntji Women's Centre, where many artists of the region have worked.

Influenced by the Hermannsburg School, Jugadai's paintings reflect her Tjuukurrpa, the complex spiritual knowledge and relationships between her and her landscape. The paintings also reflect fine observation of the structures of the vegetation and environment. Jugadai's works were selected for exhibition at the National Aboriginal & Torres Strait Islander Art Awards five times between 1993 and 2001, and she was a section winner in 2000. Her paintings are held in major collections including the National Gallery of Victoria, National Gallery of Australia and the Museum and Art Gallery of the Northern Territory.

== Life ==
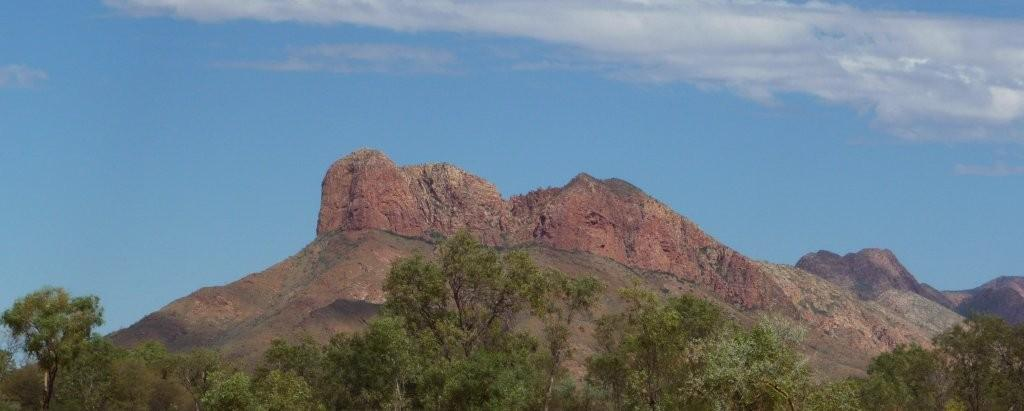
Haasts Bluff, where Daisy Jugadai was born

Daisy Jugadai was born circa 1955 at Haasts Bluff, Northern Territory, daughter of artists Narputta Nangala and Timmy Jugadai Tjungurrayi. The ambiguity around the year of birth is in part because Indigenous people operate using a different conception of time from non-Indigenous Australians, often estimating dates through comparisons with the occurrence of other events.

The people of Papunya and Haasts Bluff, such as Daisy, speak a variety of the Pintupi language referred to as Pintupi-Luritja, a Western Desert dialect. Napaltjarri (in Western Desert dialects) or Napaljarri (in Warlpiri) is a skin name, one of sixteen used to denote the subsections or subgroups in the kinship system of central Australian Indigenous people. These names define kinship relationships that influence preferred marriage partners and may be associated with particular totems. Although they may be used as terms of address, they are not surnames in the sense used by Europeans. Thus "Daisy Jugadai" is the element of the artist's name that is specifically hers.

Jugadai's childhood was spent at both Haasts Bluff and a nearby camp, Five Mile, while she was schooled at Papunya. She married Kelly Multa, and they had a daughter, Agnes. They lived on an outstation, Kungkayunti, but Daisy moved back to Haasts Bluff when Kelly died. It was not until the 1990s that she was remarried, to an Elcho Islander, after which she travelled regularly between Arnhem Land and Haasts Bluff. Jugadai died in 2008 and her funeral was held at Haasts Bluff, where she was born. Daisy Jugadai had an older sister, artist Molly Jugadai Napaltjarri, and another sister, Ester, who predeceased her.

== Art ==
=== Background ===
The contemporary Indigenous Australian art movement began in the western desert in 1971, when Indigenous men at Papunya took up painting, led by elders such as Kaapa Tjampitjinpa, and assisted by teacher Geoffrey Bardon. This initiative, which used acrylic paints to create designs representing body painting and ground sculptures, rapidly spread across Indigenous communities of central Australia, particularly following the commencement of a government-sanctioned art program in central Australia in 1983. By the 1980s and 1990s, such work was being exhibited internationally. The first artists, including all of the founders of the Papunya Tula artists' company, had been men, and there was resistance amongst the Pintupi men of central Australia to women painting. However, many women in the communities wished to participate, and in the 1990s many began to create paintings. In the western desert communities such as Kintore, Yuendumu, Balgo, and on the outstations, people were beginning to create art works expressly for exhibition and sale.

Daisy Jugadai came from a family of painters, including her uncle Uta Uta Tjangala and her mother. She learned to draw during her schooling at Papunya and Haasts Bluff, but her first experience as a painter came working on backgrounds for the pictures created by her father. From the Pintupi/Luritja language group, Daisy Jugadai was one of a range of artists who came to painting through the Ikuntji Women's Centre (later Ikuntji Artists) in the early 1990s. She is credited with a significant role in the centre's establishment. She began with screen printing and linocut printmaking, but quickly shifted to acrylic painting, producing many of her best works during the mid-1990s. Western Desert artists such as Daisy Jugadai will frequently paint particular 'dreamings' or Tjukurrpa for which they have personal responsibility or rights. A complex concept, Tjukurrpa refers to the spiritual knowledge of the landscape and custodianship of it; it also refers to laws, rules or stories that people must maintain and re-produce in their communities. Daisy Jugadai portrayed in her art both those for which she had personal responsibility, and those of her late husband and late father. These included honey ant, spinifex and emu dreamings; geographical locations that were the settings for these paintings included Muruntji waterhole and Talabarrdi, and other locations around Kungkayunti, where her family had lived for many years.

=== Career ===
Memory and Five Mile Creek (1995)

Throughout the 1990s, Daisy Jugadai was a regular exhibitor at the Araluen Art Centre in Alice Springs, as well as other major exhibitions such as the Australian Heritage Art Awards in Canberra in 1994. Recognition came in 1993, in two forms: an award of a Northern Territory Women's Fellowship; and the purchase by the Araluen Arts Centre of a work exhibited in its annual art award. Within her community she was an administrator as well as an artist. A member of the Ikuntji Women's Centre and a representative on Ikuntji Community Council, Daisy was one of those who successfully lobbied to have artist Marina Strocchi appointed as an art centre coordinator in the early 1990s. The respect between the two women was mutual: Daisy was one of a group of artists whose work was selected for an exhibition that toured regional Australian public galleries in 1999–2000, Ikuntji tjuta – touring, which was curated by Marina Strocchi, the art centre coordinator who had first helped develop the Ikuntji centre in Haasts Bluff some years earlier.

Works by Daisy Jugadai are held by the National Gallery of Victoria, National Gallery of Australia and the Museum and Art Gallery of the Northern Territory. They are also held in major private collections, such as Nangara (also known as the Ebes Collection), as well as by Edith Cowan University. First exhibiting in the National Aboriginal & Torres Strait Islander Art Awards in 1993, she was a finalist on several occasions including 1995, 1998 and 2001, and a section winner in 2000. Her 1994 entry in the award, Karu kapingku pungu (Creek after rain), belongs to the Museum and Art Gallery of the Northern Territory. Her work is also featured alongside other Indigenous artists such as Gloria Petyarre in the Melbourne international airport terminal, completed in 1996. Antiti, near Five Mile, a 1998 painting, has appeared as cover art on an issue of the Medical Journal of Australia.

=== Style ===
Alone amongst the Ikuntji artists, Daisy Jugadai worked at an easel. She cited the Hermannsburg School, a group of Indigenous artists including Albert Namatjira who began painting at Hermannsburg Mission in the 1930s, as an influence on her work. Memory and Five Mile Creek (1995) represents the country of her childhood. It shows the hills of the region in elevation rather than in plan, and represents the range of vegetation typical of that country. Curator Marina Strocchi notes how Daisy Jugadai's painting reflects close observation of the complex structures of the vegetation and environment, its features "obsessively detailed", with the artist "devotedly [including] all the bush tucker of that area", as well as choosing "a time of year in which to depict her country". Vegetation would be carefully painted with a trimmed brush, while even finer detail, such as pollen, would be rendered using a matchstick. Clouds were always the final features to be included. Despite this devotion to detail, Daisy preferred to paint large canvasses. Memory and Five Mile Creek was included in the National Gallery of Victoria's 2004–05 exhibition "Aboriginal Art Post 1984" and reviewer Miriam Cosic, while noting its "naive charm", also drew attention to the work's title and the implication that, like other more explicitly political painters of her era, "she too is talking of violent dispossession".

Artist Mandy Martin, who participated in a 2005 collaboration with several painters from the Haasts Bluff region, thought that Daisy's rendering of bush tucker was achieved with a "stylised but dazzling personal language". Writer and critic Morag Fraser described Daisy's work as "extraordinary", observing that in Daisy's paintings "nature is so wholly internalised, and its rendering so uninhibited." A distinguished artist in her community, her death coincided with a vigorous renewal of artistic expression amongst her successors.
