= Shorty Lungkata Tjungurayyi =

Australian Aboriginal artist (c. 1920–1987)

Shorty Lungkata Tjungurrayyi, c. 1920 - 1987 is a Pintupi man born at Walukuritji, south of Lake Macdonald, and is best known as an artist, and important member with Papunya Tula Artists.

Following the move to Papunya Tjungurayyi became a ngangkari and traditional doctor.

Tjungurayyi first made contact with Papunya Tula Artists in February 1972 and, as a part of this movement, he experimented with a variety of styles from simple figurative imagery to significantly more complex work; these artworks referenced Western Desert iconography used in body painting for ceremony and ritual ground paintings.

Tjungurayyi is an often under recognised artist in the Western Desert art movement.
