= Narputta Nangala =

Australian artist (1933–2010)

- Born: 1933; Karrkurutinytja
- Died: May 2010 (age 76–77)
- Known for: Painting
- Awards: Winner, "Open Painting", Telstra National Aboriginal & Torres Strait Islander Art Awards

Narputta Nangala Jugadai (1933–2010) was an Aboriginal Australian artist born at Karrkurutinytja, who later lived at Haasts Bluff (Ikuntji) in the Northern Territory. Her language group was Pintupi/Pitjantjatjara, and her Dreaming was "Snake", "Jangala, Two Men" and "Two Women". She was a senior artist in her community at Ikuntji and prominent among the Ikuntji Women's Centre (later Ikuntji Artists) painters. She was the wife of the painter, Timmy Tjungurrayi Jugadai, and mother of Daisy Jugadai Napaltjarri and Molly Jugadai Napaltjarri.

DACS represents Narputta Nangala with respect to copyright licensing.

== Career & Collections ==
Her work Karrkurutinytja (a depiction of her birthplace) is held in the Art Gallery of New South Wales.

Seven works are held in the National Gallery of Victoria, four again entitled Kaakurutinytja (Lake MacDonald), in addition to the works: One Jakamarra, 1995, Ngurrapalangu, 1994, and Tjangala kutjarra, kuniya kutjarra, Kaakurutinytja, 1996.

The Art Gallery of South Australia holds an untitled 1996 work.

The Art Gallery of Western Australia also holds a painting entitled Karrkurutinytja.

Her work, Karrakuurrutinytja, 1997 was featured in the 14th National Aboriginal and Torres Strait Islander Art Award.

In 1997 she won the Open Painting section of the Telstra National Aboriginal & Torres Strait Islander Art Awards.

Her work, Goanna dreaming, sold at Christies in 2005 for $US 2,677.

== Exhibitions ==
She had exhibitions at the Campbelltown Art Centre and at the Museum of Contemporary Aboriginal Art as well as galleries in Brisbane and Melbourne.

=== Solo exhibitions ===
- May 1995, Minyma Tjukurrpa: Kintor/Haast's Bluff Art Project, Tandanya Adelaide

=== Group exhibitions ===
- May 1995, Minyma Tjukurrpa: Kintore/Haast's Bluff Canva Project, Tandanya Adelaide. In-collaboration with artists from Nampitjinpa Women of Kintore and other Ikuntji artists as part of the Kintor/Haast's Bluff Art Project
- April 1996, Miracles of the Desert: three artists form the Ikuuntji Women's Centre, along with Eunice Napanangka and Daisy Jugadai at Haast's Bluff
- April 1997, Ikuntji Tjuta In Canberra, Alliance Francaise Canberra. Narputta Nangala attended the opening of this exhibition with fellow Ikuntji artist, Alice Nampitjinpa.
- October 1999, Ikuntji Tjuta: touring, Campbelltown City Bicentennial Art Gallery. Group exhibition of paintings from the Ikuntji Women's Centre, Haasts Bluff, Northern Territory
- June 2001, Narputta & Katungka, Gallery Gabrielle Pizzi, Melbourne. Joint exhibition of recent paintings by Narputta Nangala and fellow Ikuntji artist, Katungha Napanangka
- 18 April to 16 June 2002, Spirit Country: Contemporary Australian Aboriginal Art from the Gantner Meyer Collection, Brisbane City Gallery. Her standout pieces included her two versions of Two Women (1997) used 'repetitive horizontal bands of hills signifying a long journey'.

== See also ==
- Molly Jugadai Napaltjarri
- Daisy Jugadai Napaltjarri
