= Pinta Pinta Tjapanangka =

- Born: c. 1928; Yumari, Western Australia, Australia
- Died: 1999; Kintore, Northern Territory, Australia
- Occupation: Painter
- Years active: mid-1970s – 1999
- Organization: Papunya Tula
- Style: Western Desert art
- Children: Matthew Tjapangati (early 1960s); Nyilyari Tjapangati (c. 1965)

Pinta Pinta Tjapanangka (late 1920s – 1999) was an Australian Aboriginal artist. He was one of the first members of the Papunya Tula art movement. He is a well-known painter of Western Desert art. He belonged to the Pintupi community, and painted stories from the Pintupi Dreaming (Tingari). He painted mythological events that happened around his homeland, including around Winparrku, Lake Macdonald and Lake Mackay.

Pinta Pinta was from Western Australia. He was born at Yumari, a place in the Great Sandy Desert. He was probably born sometime in the late 1920s (around 1927 or 1928). Before contact with White society, he lived a nomadic way of life in the desert. In the 1950s, he walked with his family to stay at Haasts Bluff, a government rations outpost. This was his first contact with modern Australian civilisation. His was one of the last groups in the country to come out of the desert.

Pinta Pinta began painting in the mid-1970s, at Papunya. He moved to Kintore after it was founded in 1981. In 1984, Pinta Pinta and his family set up an outstation at Winparrku (Mount Webb), between Kintore and Kiwirrkurra. The family moved here shortly after. In 1988, he had a small part in the movie Evil Angels.

His paintings mostly stick to black, white and ochre in colour. The most obvious motif seen in them is the circles and lines, which depict dreaming tracks. Some of his works are in the Australian Museum, the National Gallery of Victoria and the Museum and Art Gallery of the Northern Territory.

He had two sons, Matthew (born early 1960s) and Nyilyari (born about 1965). Nyilyari also became a famous artist.
