= Norah Nelson Napaljarri =

Australian artist

- Born: 26 October 1956 (age 69); Haasts Bluff, Northern Territory
- Known for: Painting
- Notable work: Yiwarra (Milky Way) dreaming mosaic, Supreme Court of the Northern Territory

Norah Nelson Napaljarri (born 26 October 1956) is a Warlpiri-speaking Aboriginal artist from Australia's Western Desert region. Norah Nelson began painting in 1986 and has exhibited her works both in Australia and other countries. Her paintings and pottery are held in the collection of the National Gallery of Victoria.

== Life ==
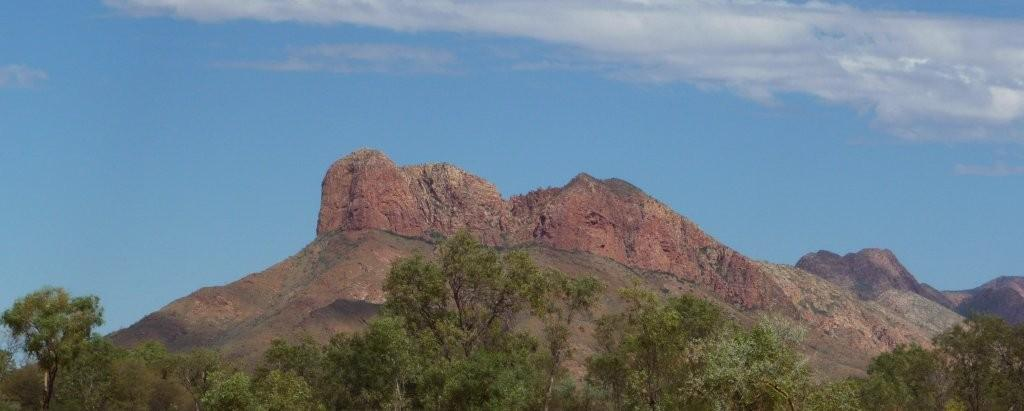
Haasts Bluff, where Norah Nelson was born.

Norah Nelson was born at Haasts Bluff, Northern Territory, north-west of Alice Springs on 26 October 1956. She married artist Jakamarra Frank 'Bronson' Nelson, who was deceased by 1994.

'Napaljarri' (in Warlpiri) or 'Napaltjarri' (in Western Desert dialects) is a skin name, one of sixteen used to denote the subsections or subgroups in the kinship system of central Australian Indigenous people. These names define kinship relationships that influence preferred marriage partners and may be associated with particular totems. Although they may be used as terms of address, they are not surnames in the sense used by Europeans. Thus 'Norah Nelson' is the element of the artist's name that is specifically hers.

== Art ==
=== Background ===
Contemporary Indigenous art of the western desert began when Indigenous men at Papunya began painting in 1971, assisted by teacher Geoffrey Bardon. Their work, which used acrylic paints to create designs representing body painting and ground sculptures, rapidly spread across Indigenous communities of central Australia, particularly following the commencement of a government-sanctioned art program in central Australia in 1983. By the 1980s and 1990s, such work was being exhibited internationally. The first artists, including all of the founders of the Papunya Tula artists' company, had been men, and there was resistance amongst the Pintupi men of central Australia to women painting. However, there was also a desire amongst many of the women to participate, and in the 1990s large numbers of them began to create paintings. In the western desert communities such as Kintore, Yuendumu, Balgo, and on the outstations, people were beginning to create art works expressly for exhibition and sale.

=== Career ===
Norah first painted in 1986, assisting her husband, but was creating works in her own right by 1987. As of 2004 she was living in Yuendumu and painted for the Indigenous art centre there, Warlukurlangu Artists. Western Desert artists such as Norah will frequently paint particular 'dreamings', or stories, for which they have personal responsibility or rights, and in Norah's case these have included Karntjarra (Two Women), Ngaru (bush plum) Ngarlkirdi (witchetty grub) and Pangkurlangu (Giant) dreamings. She has also painted a series of works based on the Yiwarra (Milky Way) dreaming, with the permission of that dreaming's senior custodian at Yuendumu, Paddy Sims. One of this series was chosen as the design for a mosaic at the new court complex for the Supreme Court of the Northern Territory, and reviewed for Art Monthly by Patrick Hutchings.

Galleries in both Australia and elsewhere have exhibited works by Norah, including Gallery Gabrielle Pizzi in Melbourne, the Lowe Art Museum at the University of Miami in the United States, and the National Gallery of Victoria. Her works are held in several major Australian collections, including the private Holmes à Court collection, and the public collection of the National Gallery of Victoria.

== Collections ==
- Holmes à Court collection
- National Gallery of Victoria
- Supreme Court of the Northern Territory
