= Patrick Tjungurrayi =

Australian Pintupi painter and activist (c. 1935–2017)

Patrick Tjungurrayi (c. 1935-1945 — December 2017), also known as Patrick Olodoodi or Patrick Yala Uluturti, was a Pintupi senior law man, painter and health advocate.

== Life and painting ==
Tjungurrayi was born near Puntujarrpa, west of Kiwirrkurra, in Central Australia. He grew up on Pintupi county, alongside the Canning Stock Route, and encountered 'no white man' until he was a young man and a helicopter flew nearby and terrified him and his family: this included his brother Tjuwi who became known as 'helicopter'. Following this Tjungurrayi and his family had many interactions with 'the white man' and there was a lot of violence and Tjungurrayi can remember many killings. Soon after this he moved to Balgo where they stayed until the establishment of the first Pintupi homelands community, Kintore, in the early 1980s; although Patrick always travelled between the two as well as to a number of other communities throughout the region where he was a labourer, building the houses that would become the community.

By 1986 the labouring became too hard and he settled in Balgo and committed his time to painting with Warlayirti Artists until he moved to Kiwirrkurra where, from 1993, he painted for Papunya Tula Artisits. By the late 1990s Tgungurrayi was refining his vision and creating increasingly powerful paintings, which coincided with a decrease in the use of pigment, Colour was, however, reintroduced after the flooding and evacuation of Kiwirrkurra in 2000, immediately following this he painted the land inundated of a mythic scale with the use of colour. He has experimented and changed his style a number of times since.

Tjungurrayi won the Western Australian Premier's Indigenous Art Award in 2008.

== Work with Purple House ==
Between 2007 and 2010 Tjungurrayi's kidneys started to fail and this encouraged him to once again advocate for his people and stand against the inadequate health services Central Australia and the Western Desert more specifically. This wasn't new to Tjungurrayi who had already contributed paintings to the Art Gallery of New South Wales auction in 2000 that gave Purple House its start and enabled people to receive dialysis 'on Country' (their traditional homelands/communities). He was the lead artist in the creation of the "Kiwirrkurra Men's Painting" which was bought by Kerry Stokes at the auction for $340,000.

Despite all of Purple House's work Tjungurrayi was still unable to receive dialysis in Kiwirrkurra as Purple House was, at that time, not allowed to operate in Western Australia, and, although saddened by this he thought he would, at the very least be able to receive treatment in Kintore or Alice Springs. Instead he was told that due to high demand people not from the Northern Territory would have to travel elsewhere and he was asked to go to, and because of the intensity of treatment, essentially move to Kalgoorlie or Perth. Tjungurrayi refused and said he would "rather die on his own Country then be sick on somebody else's".

Tjungurrayi grew up travelling the desert country that his ancestors had walked for thousands of years and he could not respect the artificial borders that were now defining his life.

Tjungurrayi fought for his right to receive treatment more local and spoke to many people, including government agencies and he was finally able to receive treatment in Alice Springs and now, with his help, Purple House (who were previously not allowed to operate in Western Australia) have established a two chair dialysis unit at Kiwirrkurra in 2014.

It was Tjungurrayi's aim to raise public and political awareness about the renal health crisis facing Aboriginal people.

Tjungarrayi's art work is now also featured on the side of the "Purple House Truck".

In December 2017 Tjungurrayi had a heart attack at home and subsequently died in a hospital in Alice Springs.

== See also ==
- Art of Australia
