= Purple House (Alice Springs) =

Aboriginal health service in Australia

- Founded: 2003
- Type: Non-Profit Organization
- Purpose: Remote dialysis, kidney disease
- Headquarters: Alice Springs, Australia
- Location: Northern Territory, South Australia, Western Australia
- Method: Remote dialysis, social support, social enterprise, aged care, NDIS
- Key people: CEO Sarah Brown AM

Western Desert Nganampa Walytja Palyantjaku Tjutaku Aboriginal Corporation, better known as Purple House is an Indigenous owned and run non profit health service based in Alice Springs in the Northern Territory of Australia. It specialises in the provision of dialysis to Indigenous Australians in remote communities across the Northern Territory, Western Australia and South Australia.

== History ==
Purple House was formally established in 2003 by the Pintupi people of the Western Desert in response to a growing health and cultural crisis. A series of collaborative paintings were produced by senior Pintupi artists, many of whom were represented by Papunya Tula. The paintings raised over $1 million at an auction at the Art Gallery of NSW in 2000 which funded the established of Western Desert Nganampa Walytja Palyantjaku Tjutaku Aboriginal Corporation. Remote Indigenous Australians are up to twenty times more likely to experience end-stage kidney failure than non-Indigenous people. Throughout the 1990s, increasing numbers of Aboriginal people were being forced to leave their traditional lands for end-stage renal failure. Many required dialysis which meant permanent relocation to regional centres such as Alice Springs or Darwin, away from country and family, and removing their ability to pass on important cultural knowledge to their communities.

Purple House began dialysis services in a suburban house in Alice Springs, which was painted purple, inspiring its name Purple House. Its first remote dialysis clinic in Kintore opened in 2004. It now runs 18 other clinics in the NT, WA and SA and two mobile dialysis units called the Purple Truck. The organisation is supported through an innovative mix of philanthropic and self-generated funds, and Northern Territory and Commonwealth Government support. Three new clinics opened in 2019, including Purple House's first South Australia clinic. Purple House has expanded significantly to offer social, aged care and NDIS support, as well as running a social enterprise called Bush Balm, which draws in Indigenous knowledge systems around bush medicine.

After years of lobbying, in 2018 it was announced that dialysis in very remote areas would be funded by Medicare.

== Awards and recognitions ==
Purple House received an Indigenous Governance Award from Reconciliation Australia in 2016. It was named Telstra NT Business of the Year in 2018.

Purple House CEO, Sarah Brown AM was recognised with an Order of Australia in the Queen’s Birthday 2020 Honours List “for significant service to community health, to remote area nursing, and to the Indigenous community”. In 2017 she was Hesta Australia’s Nurse of the Year and in 2018 made the AFR BOSS magazine’s ‘True Leaders’ list.
