= Toas =

Toas are small composite and painted artifacts made by members of the Diyari and collected by Lutheran Missionary Johann Reuther at the Killalpaninna Mission in South Australia beginning in 1904.

Reuther claimed they were used as 'signposts' on vacating a camp to tell those following where they had gone. Each toas thus represented a particular place, by way of its carved shape and painted detail. In 1906 Reuther retired from the mission and sold 385 toas to the South Australian Museum (images of toas) for £400. They probably have more in common with 'marker pegs' than message sticks.

The toas combined Aboriginal and European technologies and were made within a frontier context at the mission. They often used gypsum as substrate for painting and incorporating object such as shells, gypsum paste also hid European methods of joining pieces of wood which provided the armature. Gypsum was often used in Aboriginal mourning ceremonies.

While there is no doubt the manufacture and form of the toas are Aboriginal and that they mythologically encode place names, it is suggested that they were made at the mission in response to an easy supply of surplus gypsum and the active interest of an inquiring German missionary. As such they are now regarded as precursors of the Western Desert Painting Movement.

The origin of the word toas for these objects is probably an idiosyncratic usage by Reuther, perhaps in a mission pidgin, extending terms (from the Bilatapa language as well as of Diyari) which imply burying, covering up, inserting, or sticking into the ground.

Less generous commentators have said that Reuther was just setting himself up with an exit fund by supplying authentic Aboriginal artefacts to an under-supplied market.

The names of those who may have had a role in producing the toas are Petrus or Peter Pinnaru, Emil Kintalakadi, Elias Palkalinna (Diari), Elisha Tjerkalina (Diari), Andreas Dibana, Johannes Pingilina (Diari), Moses (Tirari), Titus (Diari) and Joseph Ngantajlina (Diari Lake Hope).

A contemporary artist re-envisioning the toas is Irene Kemp.
