= Makinti Napanangka =

Indigenous Australian artist from the Western Desert region (c. 1930 – 2011)

- Born: circa 1930 (Note: 1930 is birth year per most searches; other sources indicate 1922 or 1932.); East Gibson Desert, Western Australia, Australia
- Died: 9 January 2011; Alice Springs, Northern Territory, Australia
- Known for: Painting
- Notable work: Untitled (Lupul rockhole)
- Awards: 2008 National Aboriginal & Torres Strait Islander Art Award

Makinti Napanangka AM (c. 1930 – 9 January 2011) referred to posthumously as Kumentje, (Note: The term Kumentje was used instead of her personal name as it is customary among many indigenous communities not to refer to deceased people by their original given names for some time after their deaths.) was a Pintupi-speaking Indigenous Australian artist from Australia's Western Desert region. She lived in the communities of Haasts Bluff, Papunya, and later at Kintore, about 50 kilometres (31 mi) north-east of the Lake MacDonald region where she was born, on the border of the Northern Territory and Western Australia. Makinti died in 2011 in Alice Springs and she was posthumously awarded an AM later that year.

Makinti Napanangka began painting Contemporary Indigenous Australian art at Kintore in the mid-1990s, encouraged by a community art project. Interest in her work developed quickly, and she is now represented in most significant Australian public art galleries, including the National Gallery of Australia. A finalist in the 2003 Clemenger Contemporary Art Award, Makinti won the National Aboriginal & Torres Strait Islander Art Award in 2008. Her work was shown in the major indigenous art exhibition Papunya Tula: Genesis and Genius, at the Art Gallery of New South Wales.

Working in synthetic polymer on linen or canvas, Makinti's paintings primarily take as their subjects a rockhole site, Lupul, and an indigenous story (or "dreaming") about two sisters, known as Kungka Kutjarra. She was a member of the Papunya Tula Artists Cooperative, but her work has been described as more spontaneous than that of her fellow Papunya Tula artists.

== Personal life ==
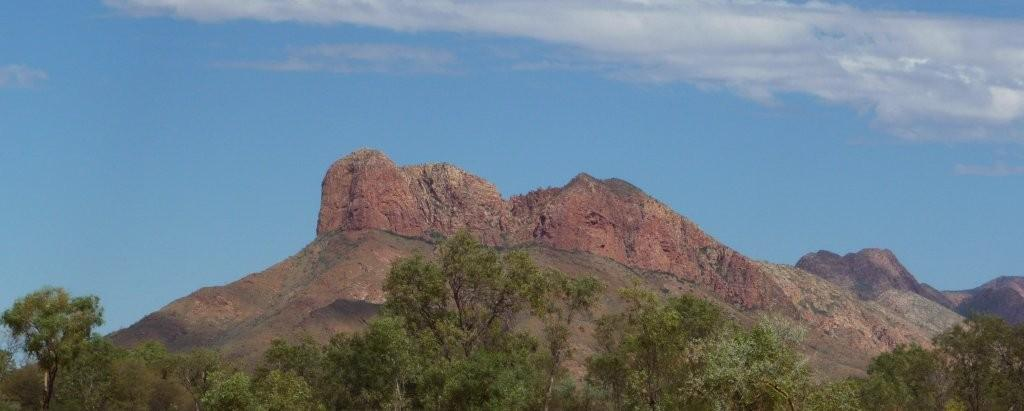
Haasts Bluff, where Makinti lived in the 1940s and 1950s

Makinti Napanangka's year of birth is uncertain, but several sources indicate she was born around 1930, although other sources indicate she may have been born as early as 1922 or as late as 1932 (Note: Sources give a number of possible years of birth. Japingka Gallery's biography says "around 1932"; Johnson's major survey of Papunya Tula artists says c. 1922; others suggest around 1930.) at a location described by some sources as Lupul rockhole but by one major reference work as Mangarri. All sources agree that she comes from the area of Karrkurritinytja (Note: There is a wide range of spellings of the indigenous name given to the Lake MacDonald area, including Karrukurutjuntja and Kaakuratintja.) or Lake MacDonald, which straddles the border between Western Australia and the Northern Territory, 50 kilometres (31 mi) south-west of Kintore, and about 500 kilometres (310 mi) west of Alice Springs.

Makinti was a member of the Pintupi group of indigenous people, who are associated with the communities of Papunya, Kintore, and Kiwirrkura. "Napanangka" is a skin name, one of eight used to denote the subgroups in the Pintupi kinship system, not a surname in the sense used by Europeans. Thus her personal name was "Makinti". The uncertainty around Makinti's date and place of birth arises from the fact that Indigenous Australians often estimate dates of birth by comparison with other events, especially for people born before contact with European Australians. They may also cite the place of birth as being where the mother first felt the foetus move, rather than where the birth took place.

Makinti's first contact with white people was seeing them riding camels, when she was living at Lupul. She was one of a large group of people who walked into Haasts Bluff in the early 1940s, together with her husband Nyukuti Tjupurrula (brother of artist Nosepeg Tjupurrula), and their son Ginger Tjakamarra, born around 1940. At Haasts Bluff they had a second child, Narrabri Narrapayi, in 1949. The population moved to Papunya in the late 1950s, where Makinti had another child, Jacqueline Daaru, in 1958. She had a daughter, Winnie Bernadette, in 1961 in Alice Springs. The family moved to Kintore when it was established in the early 1980s, and by 1996 Kumentje was painting there for the Papunya Tula Artists Cooperative. Her children Ginger, Narrabri, and Jacqueline also became artists, all of them painting for Papunya Tula Artists.

Physically tiny yet robust and strong, Kumentje was described as "a charmer and an irascible character", with an infectious smile. She died in Alice Springs in January 2011.

== Artistic career ==
Artists of the Papunya Tula movement were painting at Haasts Bluff in the late 1970s, but the deaths of some of the main painters in the early 1980s led to a period of decline. In 1992, the Ikuntji Women's Centre was opened at Haasts Bluff and a new painting movement quickly developed, supported by founding art coordinator Marina Strocchi, who assisted in artists' development at both Haasts Bluff and Kintore. It was through this initiative that Kumentje began painting in 1994 for the Minyma Tjukurrpa (Kintore/Haasts Bluff Project) and by 1997 her work was being acquired by major collecting institutions. She was one of the "Kintore ladies" who joined earlier generations of the famous Papunya Tula artists, and was referred to as "number one" by her fellow artists, of whom she was considered a leader. She painted with the Papunya Tula Artists Cooperative, in which she was a shareholder, from 1996, alongside artist such as Ningura Napurrula.

Rocks at Lupulnga (2000), painting by Makinti Napanangka Image: the artist, Papunya Tula Artists Ltd, Utopia Art Sydney and Aboriginal Artists Agency Ltd

The only break in her career was in 1999, when she underwent a cataract operation, (Note: While the Japingka gallery places the operation in 1998, Johnson had met with the artist in 1999, describing her as "almost blind with cataracts".) an event that journalist Nicolas Rothwell suggested was associated with a distinct shift in her work, including the increasing use of thick lines. Johnson said the operation resulted in "a collection of light-flooded canvases"; Art Gallery of New South Wales curator Hetti Perkins said that, after her recovery, "her work showed renewed vigour".

Makinti's works were selected to hang in five consecutive National Aboriginal and Torres Strait Islander Art Award (NATSIAA) exhibitions, beginning in 1997. In 2000, she held her first solo exhibition, and was one of the artists whose works were included in the major exhibition Papunya Tula: Genesis and Genius at the Art Gallery of New South Wales. The following year, she was a finalist at the NATSIAA. 2003 saw her named by Australian Art Collector magazine as one of the country's 50 most collectible artists, an assessment repeated by that magazine in 2004, 2005, and 2006. Also in 2003, she was among the finalists for the Clemenger Contemporary Art Award. By 2006, her works were commanding "the upper end of the price spectrum", though the resale values of those of her works not sold through Papunya Tula artists were considered precarious, owing to such works being of variable quality.

In August 2008, Makinti won the $40,000 NATSIAA, but her age and circumstances prevented her from accepting it in person. In October 2008, she was one of several prominent artists whose works featured in a charity auction securing funds for the Menzies School of Health Research in Darwin. Her painting sold for A$18,500, a significant contribution to the quarter of a million dollars raised. In 2009, she was again a finalist in the NATSIAA, with an untitled painting and was also a finalist in the Togart Contemporary Art Award the same year. In 2011 she was a finalist in the 36th Alice Art Prize and in 2011 she was posthumously awarded the Member of the Order of Australia, for "service to the arts as a contemporary Indigenous artist, to women painters of the Western Desert Art movement, and to the community of the Northern Territory".

Most of Australia's public collections hold one or more works by Makinti, including the National Gallery of Australia, the Art Gallery of New South Wales, the National Gallery of Victoria, the Queensland Art Gallery, Brisbane and the Museum and Art Gallery of the Northern Territory. She participated in some major group exhibitions, such as Papunya Tula: Genesis and Genius at the Art Gallery of New South Wales, and Colour Power at the National Gallery of Victoria, as well as having had a small number of solo exhibitions at private galleries, including the gallery of influential art dealer Gabrielle Pizzi. The National Portrait Gallery in Canberra has in its collection a photographic portrait of Kumentje, by Malaysian-born Australian artist Hari Ho. Her work was selected for inclusion in the 2012 Sydney Biennale.

== Style of painting ==
Makinti's works, including her Clemenger Award and NATSIAA paintings, are created with synthetic polymer on linen or canvas.

Many paintings by artists of the Western Desert relate to water, while the story (or "dreaming") most frequently portrayed by Western Desert women is Kungka Kutjarra, or Two Women, concerning the travel of two sisters. Makinti's works reflect those themes, and are particularly associated with a rockhole site, Lupul, (Note: The site is sometimes referred to as Lupulnga, which in Pintupi is the absolutive case of Lupul.) and with Kungka Kutjarra. Her untitled painting in the Genesis and Genius exhibition was based on Kungka Kutjarra, while the painting that won the 2008 Telstra award related to Lupul. The iconography of her paintings includes the use of lines representing paths and ceremonial hair-string skirts, and circles representing water-holes.

According to Art Gallery of New South Wales indigenous art curator and NATSIAA judge Hetti Perkins, Makinti and her work are "very dynamic and charismatic". Although a member of the Papunya Tula Artists, Makinti's work has been described as taking "a more spontaneous approach in illustrating the traditional iconography than that done by previous artists painting at Papunya". Her style evolved over time, beginning with gestural brush strokes in ordered compositions, and developing into more closely interwoven representations of the hair-string skirts and designs reflecting those used in body painting. Throughout this evolution, her colour palette has consistently included a subtle range of yellows and pinks, through to oranges and whites.

Judith Ryan, senior curator at the National Gallery of Victoria, described Makinti's entry in the 2003 Clemenger Contemporary Art Award as:

concerned with touching and sensing with fingers, rather than purely visual. The repetition of colour chords and textured striations, which closely echo each other, has a rhapsodic effect akin to many bodies in dance and reveals the inner or spiritual power, the essence, of Makinti Napanangka's country and cultural identity. The energetic lines invoke body paint for women’s business, and more particularly represent spun hair-string, which is used to make belts worn by women during ceremonies associated with the rockhole site of Lupulnga, a Peewee Dreaming place.

Reviewing the same exhibition, Robert Nelson described Makinti's work as "sensual and chromatically effusive painting". The work of the "Kintore ladies" has created "some of the most richly textured surfaces in the history of the (Papunya Tula) company"; Makinti's painting for Genesis and Genius was hailed as "a painterly celebration of colour and form".

== Major collections ==
- Art Gallery of New South Wales
- Campbelltown City Art Gallery
- Museum and Art Gallery of the Northern Territory
- National Gallery of Australia
- National Gallery of Victoria
- Queensland Art Gallery
- Macquarie Bank collection
- Shell Aboriginal Art Fund Collection
- Kluge-Ruhe Aboriginal Art Collection of the University of Virginia

== Solo exhibitions and awards ==
- 1997 – 14th National Aboriginal & Torres Strait Islander Art Award
- 1998 – 15th National Aboriginal & Torres Strait Islander Art Award
- 1999 – 16th National Aboriginal & Torres Strait Islander Art Award
- 2000 – 17th National Aboriginal & Torres Strait Islander Art Award
- 2000 – Utopia Art, Sydney
- 2001 – finalist, 18th National Aboriginal & Torres Strait Islander Art Award
- 2001 – Utopia Art, Sydney
- 2002 – Gallery Gabrielle Pizzi, Melbourne
- 2003 – Utopia Art, Sydney
- 2003 – finalist, Clemenger Contemporary Art Award at the National Gallery of Victoria
- 2007 – finalist, 24th National Aboriginal & Torres Strait Islander Art Award
- 2008 – winner, 25th National Aboriginal & Torres Strait Islander Art Award
