= Turkey Tolson Tjupurrula =

Australian artist (1938–2001)

- Born: circa 1942; Haasts Bluff, Northern Territory, Australia
- Died: 10 August 2001 (aged 58–59); Alice Springs, Northern Territory, Australia
- Other names: Tolson Tjupurrula, Tolsen, Turkey Tolson
- Known for: Painting
- Works: Straightening spears at Ilyingaungau
- Movement: Papunya Tula

Turkey Tolson Tjupurrula (sometimes just Turkey Tolson; c. 1938 – 10 August 2001) was a Pintupi-speaking Indigenous artist from Australia's Western Desert region. Born near Haasts Bluff, Northern Territory, Turkey Tolson was a major figure in the Papunya Tula art movement, and the longest-serving chairman of the company formed to represent its artists.

A painter whose creative output spanned nearly three decades, controversy erupted briefly in 1999, when disputed declarations were made by the artist regarding whether some works under his signature had been painted by some female relatives. Creator of the work Straightening spears at Ilyingaungau (1990), Tolson's paintings are held by several major Australian public galleries, including the Art Gallery of South Australia, National Gallery of Victoria and the National Museum of Australia.

== Life ==
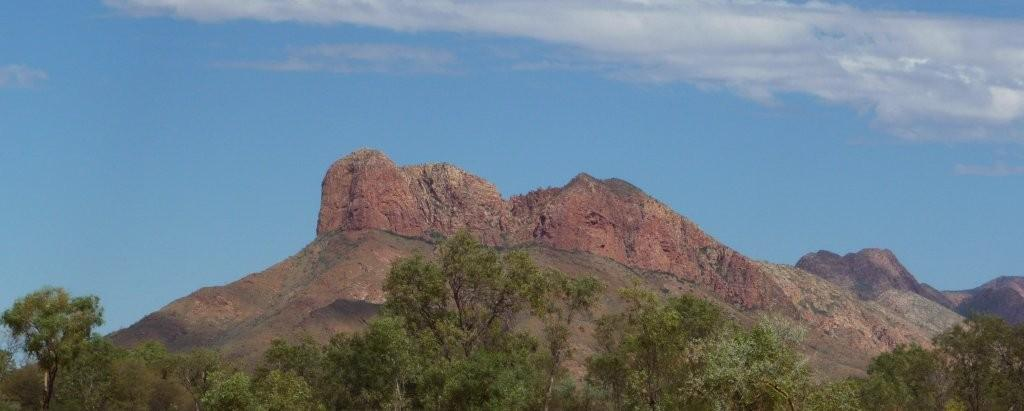
Haasts Bluff, Northern Territory, where Turkey Tolson Tjupurrula was born and raised.

Son of Toba Tjakamarra, one of the first Pintupi people to come into European settlements out of the Western Desert, Turkey Tolson was born near Haasts Bluff, west of Alice Springs, Northern Territory. Sources differ on his birth year: researcher and art historian Vivien Johnson gives an estimate of 1938, while the National Museum of Australia suggests 1943. His mother was one of Toba's three wives: the other two (his stepmothers) were the artists Wintjiya Napaltjarri and Tjunkiya Napaltjarri. He had five half-siblings, the children of Toba and Wintjiya: Bundy (born 1953), Lindsey (born 1961 and now deceased), Rubilee (born 1955), Claire (born 1958) and Eileen (born 1960).

'Tjupurrula' (in Pintupi) (also commonly seen as 'Jupurrula', this being the Warlpiri spelling) is a skin name, one of sixteen used to denote the subsections or subgroups in the kinship system of central Australian Indigenous people. These names define kinship relationships that influence preferred marriage partners and may be associated with particular totems. Although they may be used as terms of address, they are not surnames in the sense used by Europeans. Thus 'Turkey Tolson' is the element of the artist's name that is specifically his.

As a young man, Turkey Tolson worked in construction and as a stockman around Haasts Bluff, and was a skilled spear-thrower. He only came to know his birth country in 1959, after his initiation. He married and with his family moved to Papunya, Northern Territory at the time of its construction. His first wife died, and after remarrying to Mary Napanungka in 1984 he moved to Kintore, which lies within his family's traditional country. Later in life he suffered heart trouble, and was in Alice Springs receiving dialysis treatment at the time of his death on 10 August 2001.

== Art ==
Contemporary Indigenous Australian art arose in western desert communities when Indigenous men at Papunya began painting in 1971, assisted by teacher Geoffrey Bardon. Soon afterwards they established Papunya Tula, a company owned and controlled by the artists, which went on to be Australia's pre-eminent Indigenous art centre. Turkey Tolson was one of the first to paint – his name appears in the company's records in 1973; he was also one of the youngest. He was influential within the Papunya Tula movement and spent a period as the longest-serving chairman of the company. In addition to painting, Turkey Tolson also made prints, with an example held in the collection of the National Gallery of Australia.

Turkey Tolson's painting style developed in two broad phases. His early work was classical, tightly controlled and with a strong sense of symmetry characterising the geometrical arrangement of symbols and the patterns of dots surrounding them. Works from the mid-1970s, painted at Papunya, show this iconography. They include Dreaming at Kamparrarrpa (Kampurarrpa) (1976), Kampurrarrpa (Kampurarrpa) (1976) Two Women Mythology at Putja Rockhole (1977), and Tjunyinkya (1977), all held by the National Museum of Australia, and all painted in synthetic polymer paint. Turkey Tolson collaborated with Johnny Scobie Tjapanangka, a fellow Papunya artist, in creating the last of the works.

After his father's death, the artist took over ceremonial responsibility for his country. This shift to a senior place in the community was associated with a looser style and a more individualised iconography. It was during this period that he created the work Straightening spears at Ilyingaungau (1990), held by the Art Gallery of South Australia. This painting was described by both art expert Vivian Johnson and critic Susan McCulloch-Uehlin as his masterpiece, and by obituarist Rebecca Hossack as his most famous work: "a series of shimmering horizontal lines representing spears being heated and straightened over a fire by Tolson's ancestors". This and other similar works were described by art critic Susan McCulloch-Uehlin as representing not only the preparation of the spears, but also elements of Dreamings concerning fights between ancestral figures at a rock bluff west of Alice Springs.

In 1999, controversy erupted when Tolson signed a statutory declaration in which he stated that, in return for payments, he had put his signature on paintings that had been created by some of his female relatives, but then, shortly afterwards, signed a contradictory declaration. The case raised important questions about the nature of Aboriginal art, and about the "corrupting" effects of the art market. Anthropologist Fred Myers analysed the case, and concluded that the issue was not that Turkey Tolson was painting for money, or even being paid money. Rather, "Turkey's work is threatened by corruption because the conditions of his presence in Alice Springs – his need for more regular income and his dealer's need for 'product' – draw him away from the experiences that inform his painting."

Major exhibitions in which Turkey Tolson's work has featured have included Papunya Tula: Out of the Australian desert at the National Museum of Australia in 2010, and Almanac: The gift of Ann Lewis AO at the Museum of Contemporary Art, Sydney, also in 2010. The following year, his painting Spear straightening ceremony (1993) was included in a Newcastle Region Art Gallery exhibition, Speaking in Colour.

== Major collections ==
- Art Gallery of New South Wales
- Art Gallery of South Australia
- National Gallery of Australia
- National Gallery of Victoria
- National Museum of Australia
