= Yala Yala Gibbs Tjungurrayi =

Australian Indigenous artist

Yala Yala Gibbs Tjungarrayi (c. 1928 or 1924 – 1998) was a Pintupi-speaking Indigenous Australian artist. He was born at Iltuturunga, south-west of Lake Macdonald, in the Western Desert, close to the border of Western Australia and the Northern Territory. In 1963, together with his family he moved to Papunya in the Northern Territory. Tjungarrayi was one of the first group of artists painting in the Papunya Tula cooperative from its beginnings in 1971. His wife was Ningura Napurrla, another Papunya Tula artist. He was a custodian of Pintupi sacred ceremonies and sites.

== Collections ==
Works of his are held in the following art galleries/collections:

- MAGNT (Kurrkati – Goanna Dreaming 1972 and Old Man Dreaming 1974)
- NGA (Five Women in the Kalipinypa Rain Dreaming Country 1972 and Wirrpi – Near Lake Macdonald 1997)
- NGV (5 works, including Snake and water dreaming, and Tingarri dreaming at Palintja)
- Queensland Art Gallery (Tingari men running towards Marrapinta 1984)
- Kerry Stokes Collection (Eaglehawk dreaming 1998)
