= Design & Art Australia Online =

Database of Australian art and design

Design & Art Australia Online (DAAO) is an online database of Australian artists. It is fully integrated with other related databases, using syndicated metadata, making it a dynamic resource.

It began as a project begun in the 1970s at the University of Sydney under the leadership of Bernard Smith, then called Dictionary of Australian Artists (DAA), and was continued after his retirement in 1981 by Joan Kerr. The dictionary went online as the digitised version of the DAA, known as the Dictionary of Australian Artists Online, in the early 2000s, before being revised and extended as Design & Art Australia Online in 2010.

== History ==
The project to create the Dictionary of Australian Artists began in the 1970s at the University of Sydney under the leadership of Bernard Smith and funded by the Australian Research Council (ARC). Its development was continued after his retirement in 1981 by Joan Kerr (1938–2004), who brought a new standard of inclusivity to a work that had concentrated on mainstream figures.

In early 2003 Kerr found that it was not possible to publish her recent research on Australian black and white artists. In addition the 1991 edition of the Dictionary was out of print, and being marketed as a rare book, but Oxford University Press were not interested in a new edition. In both cases publishers indicated that the small size of the Australian book market meant that scholarly publications of this nature were no longer a viable financial proposition. Kerr discussed her problem with Joanna Mendelssohn when she was giving a guest lecture to Mendelssohn's Australian art history students at the College of Fine Arts (COFA). Mendelssohn's writing students had begun to publish their work online in a (now defunct) blog entitled Artwrite and she was only too aware of the lack of reliable scholarly material on Australian art on the web. She suggested to Kerr that the solution was to take her research online. Mendelssohn enlisted the support of University of New South Wales (UNSW) librarian Andrew Wells and Neil Brown, the COFA Associate Dean of Research.

When Kerr was diagnosed with terminal cancer, the project became a national effort by scholars in Australian art to ensure that Kerr's legacy would be in part a continuance of her scholarly research. Kerr asked for Vivien Johnson, author of scholarly works on Western Desert artists, to become editor in chief of the project. Before she died on 22 February 2004, she knew that a national partnership of universities, art galleries, and libraries was in the process of applying for funding to create the Dictionary of Australian Artists Online (DAAO). The first ARC grant in support of the project was a partnership headed by UNSW, the Art Gallery of New South Wales, The National Gallery of Australia, the National Library of Australia, the State Library of New South Wales, the University of Sydney, and Charles Darwin University.

Initially, three major books were digitised: the two works by Kerr (Dictionary of Australian Artists, Painters, Sketchers, Photographers and Engravers to 1870. (1992) ISBN 0-19-553290-2 and Heritage: The National Women's Art Book (1995) ISBN 976-641-045-3) and one by Johnson (Western Desert Artists: A Biographical Dictionary (1995) ISBN 976-8097-81-7), plus a database of cartoonists prepared previously by Kerr and of prints by Roger Butler of the National Gallery of Australia. Johnson, with the assistance of Tess Allas and Laura Fisher, also added an extensive database of Aboriginal biographies created as a part of her Storylines project, a three-year ARC-funded survey of "non-remote" Indigenous artists undertaken from 2007 to 2009.

The first project director was Leonie Hellmers (2005 to 2008).

In 2010, after a third ARC grant, the DAAO began the process of revising its website and transforming itself into Design & Art Australia Online. In late July 2011, the new website was launched.

In 2015 DAAO was awarded another ARC grant, on the 10th anniversary of the first one.

== Description and governance ==
DAAO aims to be the "definitive open access source of information on Australian artists". Today it is fully integrated with other related databases, using syndicated metadata, making it a dynamic resource.

As of 2023 the lead chief investigator is Ross Harley, while Olivia Bolton is project manager. DAAO is governed by a management committee, consisting of representatives of the Universities of Sydney and New South Wales, along with chief investigators. The editorial board includes Mendelssohn and Harley, along with six others.
