= Ningura Napurrula =

Pintupi-speaking Indigenous Australian artist

- Born: c.1938 Waltuka, Kiwirrkurra
- Died: 11 November 2013
- Notable work: Wirrulnga Sequence
- Movement: Papunya Tula Art
- Spouse: Yala Yala Gibbs Tjungurrayi

Ningura Napurrula (born c.1938 – 2013) was a Pintupi-speaking Indigenous Australian artist from the Western Desert, whose work was internationally acclaimed. Her works included a site-specific commission for the ceiling of the Musée du Quai Branly in Paris, as well as appearing on an Australian postage stamp.

== Personal life ==
Napurrula was born circa 1938 in Watulka, south of Kiwirrkurra in the East Gibson Desert, Western Australia. Her first journey out of the desert was in 1962 with the Northern Territory Welfare Branch patrol, when her son needed medical treatment at Papunya. She travelled with her son and her husband, Yala Yala Gibbs Tjungurrayi, back to Kiwirrkurra that year. The following year Napurrula and her family group returned, this time as part of a migration of the Pintupi people due to drought.

Napurrula died on 11 November 2013 from kidney disease. Her sons Morris Gibson Tjapaltjarri (Mawitji) and Adam Gibbs Tjapaltjarri are painters, as well as her daughter Glenys Napaltjarri.

== Career ==
It was through her husband, Yala Yala Gibbs Tjungurrayi's painting that Napurrula first began work as an artist, supporting the production of his work, alongside his two other wives. Tjungurrayi was a founder of the Papunya Tula Artists and was a proponent of the Tingari style of painting, which was popular in Pintupi men's painting in the 1990s. In the 1980s the family moved to live in Walungurru, a newly established settlement and it was here that Tjungurrayi's wives, including Napurrula, worked on his paintings.

=== Artistic style ===
In 1995, Napurrula joined the Kintore/Haasts Bluff women's painting project, which was in its second year at that time. It was there that she developed her signature style of diachrome patterns, with occasional use of colour. She formally joined the Papunya Tula company in 1996. Napurrula, along with other women artists, revitalised the company with their work, after the death of many of the male artists in the preceding years.

After her husband's death in 1998, the volume of paintings she produced increased. Her style is reminiscent of some of Tjungurrayi's work, but her subject - women's lives and experiences and their role in mythology – differs. Comparisons have been drawn between her work and that of other Papunya Tula artists, such as Makinti Napanangka and Inyuwa Nampitjinpa. Her status not just as an artist, but as a guardian of cultural heritage meant she was highly regarded in her community and beyond in her lifetime. The palette she used and the way the paint is layered on the canvas is seen as reminiscent of how body paint is used by women in ceremonial activities.

Early works examined a range of subjects, but later in her career much of Napurrula's work focussed on the rockhole site of Wirrulnga, which was closely associated with birth and women's lives.

During her lifetime, Napurrula donated works to set-up and support the Western Desert Dialysis program. The program made dialysis available to remote communities through a purple lorry, which travelled between them; Napurrula's work featured on one side of it. At the end of her life she benefited from the treatment the program she had supported could provide.

=== Exhibitions ===
Napurrula's work was exhibited in several group shows in 1999 in Sydney, Melbourne and Darwin. Her first solo exhibition was at William Mora Aboriginal Art in 2000. In 2015 her work featured in a joint exhibition in Singapore, alongside the work of Nanyuma Napagati. Her work has been exhibited in dozens of other exhibitions.

In 2002, her work reached national prominence when it featured on an Australian postage stamp.

=== Collections ===
Napurrula's work is highly collectable and in 2007 and 2008 she was voted one of Australia's most collectable artists by Australian Art Collector Magazine. Her work is held by a number of significant galleries, including the Art Gallery of New South Wales, where several works are part of the larger suite Tjukurrpa Palurukutu, Kutjupawana Palyantjanya – same stories, a new way. Other collections include: National Gallery of Australia.

==== Musée du Quai Branly ====
In 2006 Napurrula with three other female and four male artists were commissioned by the Musée du Quai Branly in Paris to produce new works for its ceilings and roof. She saw this as the pinnacle of her career. Napurrual created a huge design on the first floor ceilings of the museum, based on the work Wirrulnga in the collection at the National Gallery of New South Wales.

=== Awards ===
2002 - Highly Commended in the Alice Prize
