= Tjurunga =

Object of religious significance to some Central Australian Aboriginal people

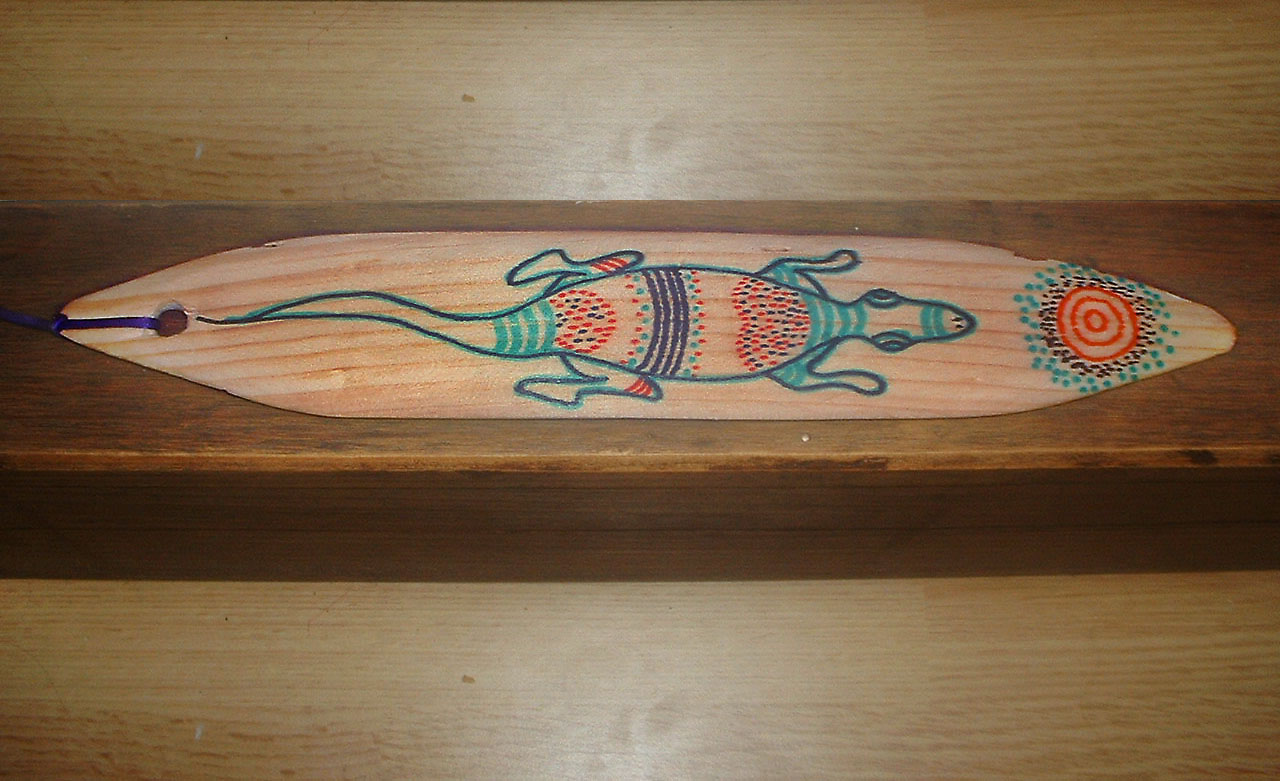
churinga

A tjurunga, also spelt churinga and tjuringa, is an object considered to be of religious significance by Central Australian Aboriginal people of the Arrernte (Aranda, Arunta) groups. The word derives from the Arrernte word Tywerenge which means sacred or precious. Tjurunga often had a wide and indeterminate native significance. They may be used variously in sacred ceremonies, as bullroarers, in sacred ground paintings, in ceremonial poles, in ceremonial headgear, in sacred chants and in sacred earth mounds.

== Meaning ==
Generally speaking, tjurunga are sacred stone or wooden objects possessed by private or group owners together with the legends, chants, and ceremonies associated with them. They were present among the Arrernte, the Luritja, the Kaitish, the Unmatjera, and the Illpirra. These items are most commonly oblong pieces of polished stone or wood. Some of these items have hair or string strung through them and were named "bull roarers" by Europeans. Upon each tjurunga is a totem of the group to which it belongs. Tjurunga are highly sacred, in fact, they are considered so sacred that only a few are able to see them and likewise it is considered sacrilegious to publish a picture of them. Durkheim suggests that the name "churinga" is normally a noun, but can also be used as an adjective meaning "sacred".

The term Tjurunga was translated by Carl Strehlow to mean something similar to secret and personal. Tju means "hidden" or "secret", and runga means "that which is personal to me". Kempe argued against this translation and suggested that Tju means "great", "powerful", or "sacred" and that runga did not translate into personal ownership.

== Cultural details ==
=== Ownership ===
The ownership of sacred tjurunga amongst the Arrernte groups was determined largely by "the conception site" of every individual member of a patrilineal totemic clan. Because these relics are considered sacred, their availability is limited to a small number of people. During the early 20th century and before, only initiated males were able to see or touch these sacred objects. Women and uninitiated males were not allowed to touch them or see them, except from a far distance. The tjurunga were kept separately from the rest of the clan in a sacred location that was also unavailable to the uninitiated and women.

While some theorists, such as Strehlow, have suggested these relics are amongst the very few forms of property which may be owned legitimately by individual persons in Central Australia, Durkheim and Kempe contend that the tjurunga cannot be owned by an individual. For example, Durkheim writes, "As concerns the meaning of the word runga, that seems very doubtful. The ceremonies of the Emu belong to all the members of the Emu clan; all can participate in them; they are not the personal property of any member."

In recent decades there have been moves to repatriate these sacred objects from museum collections back to their traditional owners.

=== Religious aspects ===
In many myths the ancestors themselves are said to have used them and stored them away as their most treasured possessions. Such myths emphasise the life-holding magical properties of these tjurungas. The ancestor regarded his tjurunga as portions of his own being; and is always worried that strangers might come and rob him of the very essence of his life. Accordingly, legends abound with stories of theft and robbery, and the very fierce vengeance exacted. Tjuringa were thought to have magical properties. They would be rubbed on the body to confer sacredness onto the subject and to do things such as heal wounds. While tjuringa were useful to the individual, the clan's collective fate was also considered to be tied up with the items. After all, it was the totemic image that provided representation for the group on the tjuringa.

The acquisition of sufficient knowledge leading to possession of personal tjurunga was long, difficult and sometimes extremely painful. Practices differed amongst the various groups. Ted Strehlow describes how the men from the Northern, Southern and Western Arrernte groups were put on probation for several years after their last initiations.

=== Ceremonial significance ===
The tjurunga were visible embodiments of some part of the fertility of the great ancestor of the totem in question. The body of the ancestor merely undergoes a transmutation into something that will weather all the assaults of time, change and decay. Stone tjurunga were thought to have been made by the ancestors themselves. The wooden tjurunga made by the old men are symbolical of the actual tjurunga which "cannot be found". These "man-made" tjurunga were accepted without reservation as sacred objects.

At the time of receiving his tjurunga-body a young man may be twenty-five years of age. He will often be thirty-five or forty years of age before the most sacred chants and ceremonies that are linked with it have passed into his possession. As he grows older and continues to demonstrate his worthiness, he receives an ever-increasing share in the tjurunga owned by his own totemic clan. Eventually he may become a member of the assembly of senior Lawmen who are honoured trustees for the ancient traditions of the whole clan.

In 1933, Strehlow noted that after the advent of white men to Central Australia, the young men employed by the foreign intruders were watched very closely by the old men of their group. In many cases, unless the young men were outstandingly generous in their gifts towards their elders, no ceremonies or chants of power and importance were handed on to this unworthy younger generation. With the death of the old men such chants and ceremonies passed into oblivion.

== Influence on Aboriginal art ==
Early Papunya artists like Kaapa Mbitjana Tjampitjinpa and Anatjari Tjakamarra show tjurunga in their paintings. Other early Papunya artists transferred the same symbols and designs found on tjurunga onto painted canvas and board. These early paintings contained the same secret sacred knowledge as found on tjurunga incised boards and stones. This practice only lasted a short time before these secret sacred symbols were hidden by artist like Clifford Possum behind veils of dots. Most of the symbols people associate with aboriginal art from this region like concentric circles, U shapes and wavy lines all come from earlier designs on tjurunga.

== Acquisition of knowledge ==
The old men would carefully note a young man's conduct. He had to be respectful towards his elders; he had to be attentive to their advice in all things. He would know the value of silence in ceremonial matters; no account of his past experiences could be spoken within the hearing of women and children. His own marriage had to conform to the laws of the group. One day the old men, sitting in a circle, would call him in to sit down in their midst. They began to chant. One man told Strehlow:

The old men seized my hand. They all struck up the chant-verse:

With fierce eyes, with glowing eyes, they seize the thumb;
With fierce eyes, with glowing eyes, they rip off the nail.

An old man produced a sharp kangaroo bone (ntjala). He stabbed my thumb with it, pushed the bone deeply underneath the nail. He drew the point out; the rest kept up the chant. He thrust it under the nail in a different place. He gradually loosened the thumbnail. It was slippery with blood. I almost shrieked with pain; the torment was unbearable. I have not forgotten it: the pain was not slight; it was exceedingly great. When the nail had been loosened, he took a sharp opossum tooth, forced it into the living flesh through the base of the thumb-nail, and tore the nail off from behind. Blood spurted over his hand. The man chanted:

They rip off the nail, they tear off the nail;
Blood flows like a river, rushes along like a river.

Then they seized my left hand and removed the thumb-nail in like manner.

Nowadays we make a great concession to the young men in our group. We no longer tear off their finger-nails. The price is too high; we give the tjurunga to them at a much lower cost. Besides, the young men of the present generation are no longer hardy enough to endure such pain.

== Relationship to historical research ==
These sacred relics were of high interest to early European anthropologists and sociologists, who were studying the nature of totemic religion and the sacred. Scholars such as Spencer, Gillen, Strehlow, Kempe and Durkheim all studied tjurunga. Durkheim discusses the nature of tjurunga throughout his seminal work The Elementary Forms of Religious Life (1912). He considered the tjurunga to be an archetype of the sacred item.

== Bibliography ==
- Durkheim, Emile, The Elementary Forms of Religious Life, trans. Karen Fields, The Free Press, 1995 (Originally Published in 1912)
- Kempe, H. “Vocabulary of the Tribes Inhabiting the Macdonnell Ranges,” RSSA, v.XIV, 1898 p. 1–54
- Spencer, B., & Gillen, F. The Arunta – A Study of a Stone Age People, Macmillan, London, 1927. Vol. II, p. 571
- Strehlow, T.G.H, Aranda Traditions, Melbourne University Press, 1947. p. 85-6
