= Doreen Reid Nakamarra =

Australian Aboriginal artist

- Born: c.1955 Mummine near Warburton, Western Australia
- Died: 20 October 2009; Adelaide, South Australia
- Awards: National Aboriginal & Torres Strait Islander Art Award (2008)

Doreen Reid Nakamarra (c.1955 – 20 October 2009) was an Australian Aboriginal artist and painter. Reid was considered an important artist within the Western Desert cultural bloc. She was a leading painter at the Papunya Tula artist cooperative in Central Australia.

== Personal life ==
Reid was born in Mummine near Mirlirrtjarra / Warburton, Western Australia in the mid-1950s. In 1984, Reid and her husband George Tjampu Tjapaltjarri, who subsequently established himself as a Papunya Tula painter, settled at the new community of Kiwirrkurra, to be closer to her husband's country. In 2007, Reid's work was displayed at the National Gallery of Australia's inaugural National Indigenous Art Triennial: Culture Warriors exhibition. The exhibit, including Reid's pieces, toured Australia state galleries before opening at the Katzen Arts Center in Washington D.C. in September 2009.

Additionally, Reid's work was featured at the Moscow Biennale of Contemporary Art in 2009. She was awarded the Telstra National Aboriginal and Torres Strait Islander Art Award general painting prize in 2008 for an untitled work. The work depicts designs associated with the Marrapinti rockhole site, west of the Pollock Hills in Western Australia.

In September 2009, Reid travelled to New York City for the opening of a Papunya Tula art exhibition which included her work. The New York exhibition was opened by Hetti Perkins, the curator of Aboriginal and Torres Strait Islander art at the Art Gallery of New South Wales in Sydney.

== Death ==
Reid died a few weeks after returning from a major exhibition in the United States of America (USA). On 18 October 2009, Reid was admitted to the hospital for treatment of pneumonia. She was flown from Alice Springs to Adelaide, where she died in the hospital on 20 October 2009, at the age of 50.

Paul Sweeney, the general manager of Papunya Tula, praised Reid as an important artist and spokesperson.

== Exhibitions ==
- 2007 National Indigenous Art Triennial '07:Culture Warriors - 13 October 2007 - 10 February 2008 - The National Gallery of Australia.
- 2009 National Indigenous Art Triennial '07:Culture Warriors. The National Gallery of Australia - Katzen Arts Centre, Washington, USA
- 2009 Icons of the Desert - Early Aboriginal Paintings from Papunya - 1 September - 5 December, New York University Grey Art Gallery, USA, 2009
- 2009 Moscow Biennale of Contemporary Art.
- 2010 Adelaide Biennial of Australian Art - Before and After Science - Art Gallery of South Australia - 27 February - 2 May 2010

== Prizes ==
- 2008 - Telstra National Aboriginal and Torres Strait Islander Art Award - $4,000 general painting award - for an untitled work about a rockhole - Marrapinti.

== Collections ==
- Seattle Art Museum
- Metropolitan Museum of Art
- Art Gallery of New South Wales
- Herbert F. Johnson Museum of Art
