= Heritage: The National Women's Art Book =

Australian art book edited by Joan Kerr

- Editor: Joan Kerr
- Language: English
- Genre: Art history
- Publisher: Craftsman House | G+B Arts International Limited
- Publication date: 1995
- Publication place: Australia
- Pages: 483
- ISBN: 9766410453
- OCLC: 32438124

Heritage: The National Women's Art Book is a 483-page volume edited by Australian art historian, Joan Kerr. The second subtitle, 500 works by 500 Australian women artists from colonial times to 1955, shows its scope. The book was published in 1995 to celebrate the 20th anniversary of International Women's Year. It was launched by Carmen Lawrence, then Minister for Human Services and Health, at the National Gallery in Canberra.

The first part contains images and descriptions of 500 works by 500 individual Australian women artists grouped under the following chapter headings:

1. Exhibitions and Competitions
2. Gender and Identity
3. Happy Families
4. Home Studios
5. Learning and Earning
6. Social Life and Travel
7. Flora and Fauna
8. Town and Country
9. Grand Themes, Myths and Legends
10. War Work
11. Nationalism and Heritage

Biographies of the 500 artists follow and are listed alphabetically.
