= Tjunkiya Napaltjarri =

Australian artist (c. 1927–2009)

- Born: 1927; North-west of Kintore, Northern Territory
- Died: 2009 (aged 81–82)
- Known for: Painting

Tjunkiya Napaltjarri (also known as Tjunkiya Kamayi, Tjungkiya, Tunkaii Napaltari, Kowai or Kamayi) (c. 1927–2009) was an Indigenous Australian artist from the Western Desert region. She was the sister of artist Wintjiya Napaltjarri.

Tjunkiya's paintings are held in major public art collections, including those of the National Gallery of Australia, the Art Gallery of New South Wales, the Museum and Art Gallery of the Northern Territory and the National Gallery of Victoria.

== Life ==
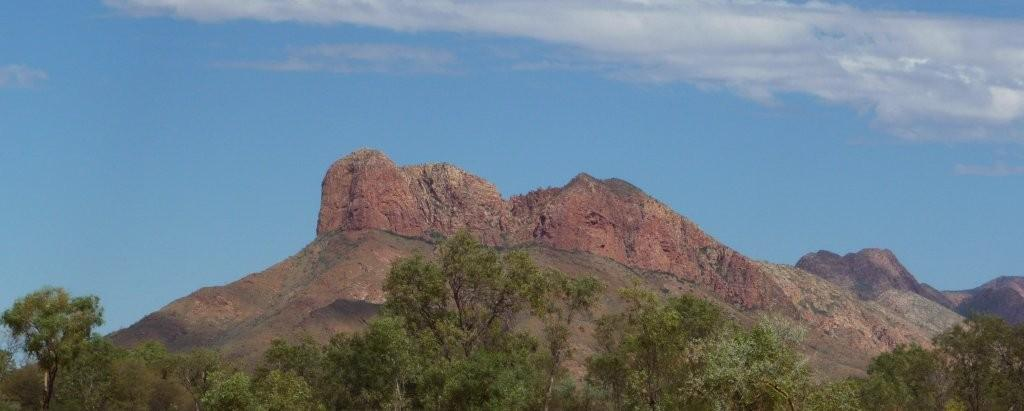
Haasts Bluff, where Tjunkiya's family first settled after she was born, and where she later painted.

Tjunkiya was born around 1927: the main biographical reference work for the region gives a date of circa 1927; while the Art Gallery of New South Wales suggests circa 1930. The ambiguity around the year of birth is in part because Indigenous Australians operate using a different conception of time, often estimating dates through comparisons with the occurrence of other events.

'Napaljarri' (in Warlpiri) or 'Napaltjarri' (in Western Desert dialects) is a skin name, one of sixteen used to denote the subsections or subgroups in the kinship system of central Australian Indigenous people. These names define kinship relationships that influence preferred marriage partners and may be associated with particular totems. Although they may be used as terms of address, they are not surnames in the sense used by Europeans. Thus 'Tjunkiya ' is the element of the artist's name that is specifically hers.

A Pintupi speaker, Tjunkiya was born in the area northwest of Walungurru (known as Kintore, Northern Territory), near the Western Australian border, and west of Alice Springs), after which her family moved to Haasts Bluff. She became second wife to Toba Tjakamarra, father of one of the prominent founders of the Papunya Tula art movement, Turkey Tolson Tjupurrula. At Haasts Bluff she had ten children: these included sons Billy Rowe and Riley Rowe, both of whom painted for Papunya Tula, and daughter Mitjili (born c. 1948), who married Long Tom Tjapanangka and went on to paint at Haasts Bluff. From Haasts Bluff the family moved to Papunya and in 1981 to Kintore.

Tjunkiya was the sister of artist Wintjiya Napaltjarri, who was also a wife to Toba. Seriously ill in the mid-1990s, Tjunkiya died in 2009.

== Art ==
=== Background ===
Contemporary Indigenous art of the western desert began when Indigenous men at Papunya began painting in 1971, assisted by teacher Geoffrey Bardon. Their work, which used acrylic paints to create designs representing body painting and ground sculptures, rapidly spread across Indigenous communities of central Australia, particularly following the commencement of a government-sanctioned art program in central Australia in 1983. By the 1980s and 1990s, such work was being exhibited internationally. The first artists, including all of the founders of the Papunya Tula artists' company, had been men, and there was resistance amongst the Pintupi men of central Australia to women painting. However, there was also a desire amongst many of the women to participate, and in the 1990s large numbers of them began to create paintings. In the western desert communities such as Kintore, Yuendumu, Balgo, and on the outstations, people were beginning to create art works expressly for exhibition and sale.

=== Career ===
Like a number of the other central and western desert women in the region, Tjunkiya was introduced to painting through the Minyma Tjukurrpa (Women's Dreaming) painting project in the mid-1990s. Along with sister Wintjiya and other women, she participated in a painting camp in 1994 which resulted in "a series of very large collaborative canvases of the group's shared Dreamings". Western Desert artists such as Tjunkiya frequently paint particular 'dreamings', or stories, for which they have responsibility or rights. In this case, twenty-five women were involved in planning the works, which included three canvases that were 3 metres square, as well as two that were 3 by 1.5 metres, and Tjunkiya and Wintjiya performed a ceremonial dance as part of the preparations. Tjunkiya and her sister were determined to participate in the project despite cataracts interfering with their vision. Sources differ on when Tjunkiya and her sister Wintjiya had the cataracts removed: Vivien Johnson implies around 1999, but art centre coordinator Marina Strocchi, who worked closely with the women, states that both had the operation in 1994.

In the early 2000s she and her sister painted at Kintore, but in 2008 they were working from their home: "the widows' camp outside her 'son' Turkey Tolson's former residence". Tjunkiya and her sister Wintjiya did not confine their activities to painting canvases. The National Gallery of Victoria in 2001 purchased a collaborative batik work, created in 1994 by the sisters in cooperation with several other artists, together with a work completed by Tjunkiya alone. The sisters also worked using drypoint etching, with 2004 a print by Tjunkiya – Rumiya kutjarra #2 – held by the National Gallery of Australia.

Works by Tjunkiya are held in major private collections, such as Nangara (also known as the Ebes Collection). Her work has been acquired by the Art Gallery of New South Wales, the National Gallery of Australia, the National Gallery of Victoria, the Museum and Art Gallery of the Northern Territory, and the Northern Territory Supreme Court. Works by both Tjunkiya and her sister Wintjiya are traded in the auction market, fetching prices of a few thousand dollars.

In 1996, Tjunkiya was represented in the Papunya Women group exhibition at Utopia Art Gallery in Sydney, while in 2000 she had an exhibition at Melbourne's William Mora Galleries and was included in the Art Gallery of New South Wales' major exhibition, Papunya Tula: Genesis and Genius.

== Collections ==
- National Gallery of Australia
- Araluen Collection (Alice Springs)
- Art Gallery of New South Wales
- Campbelltown City Art Gallery
- Museum and Art Gallery of the Northern Territory
- National Gallery of Victoria
- Supreme Court of the Northern Territory
- Artbank
- Kluge-Ruhe Aboriginal Art Collection of the University of Virginia
