= Joan Kerr =

Australian academic and cultural preservationist

Joan Kerr AM FAHA
- Born: Eleanor Joan Lyndon; 21 February 1938; Sydney, New South Wales, Australia
- Died: 22 February 2004 (aged 66); Sydney, New South Wales, Australia
- Education: University of Queensland; University of Sydney; University of York
- Occupations: art historian, preservationist, academic
- Years active: 1960–2003
- Known for: Dictionary of Australian Artists

Joan Kerr AM FAHA (1938–2004) was an Australian academic and cultural preservationist. Initially her interest was sparked in preserving the architectural heritage of Australia, but over time her interests spread to art history and Australian culture in general. She taught at many universities throughout the country and was involved in Historical Societies and Preservation Trusts in a variety of the territories. She wrote books on Australia's historic architecture, feminist artists, cartoonists and her major life work was the editorship of the definitive Dictionary of Australian Artists: Painters, Sketchers, Photographers and Engravers to 1870 drawing on her extensive network of contributors assembled from a lifetime of scholarship.

== Biography ==
Eleanor Joan Lyndon was born on 21 February 1938 in Sydney, New South Wales, Australia. She was the eldest child of Edna and Bob Lyndon and had five siblings. In 1951, her parents returned to their native Queensland, where Lyndon attended school at Somerville House in Brisbane. She obtained a bachelor's degree at the University of Queensland in English literature and drama.

In 1957, Lyndon met James Semple Kerr and after a three-year courtship, they married on 30 November 1960 in Brisbane, moving to Sydney almost immediately. Jim worked for Qantas and Joan was employed as a junior reporter at the magazine Weekend. The couple had two children in Australia before moving to Switzerland in 1963. In 1966, her husband's career transferred them to London, and Kerr enrolled in a medieval art and architecture class at Courtauld Institute of Art. She earned a two-year diploma and attended evening lectures on art history at the Warburg Institute. Her biggest influence came from a class in which both she and husband James enrolled and taught by Nikolaus Pevsner at Birkbeck College. That encouraged them both to devote their lives to architectural history and heritage conservation. Between 1968 and 1969, she returned to Australia and completed her Master of Arts at the University of Sydney.

After graduation, she was offered a position tutoring students at the Power Institute of Fine Arts, which she continued for the next 25 years. In 1974, both she and her husband enrolled in Doctorate courses at the University of York, but spent the first year of their degree program carrying out architectural fieldwork in Australia. Between August 1975 and December 1977, the couple completed their PhDs in England and then returned that same month for James to take up a position at Australian Heritage Commission in Canberra. Joan applied for a job at the Australian National University (ANU) and was accepted as a tutor. As the job was not full-time, she continued to work in Sydney as well. One significant project during this time was a collaboration on the inaugural exhibition in 1979 at the Elizabeth Bay House.

From 1978 forward, Kerr joined and served on committees for the Art Association of Australia and New Zealand (AAANZ), the Australasian Victorian Studies Association, the National Trust for the Australian Capital Territory, and the Royal Australian Historical Society. She was working as a postdoctoral fellow at ANU, tutoring and lecturing in the History Department there and lecturing in the School of the Built Environment at the University of Canberra. In 1980, she co-authored, with James Broadbent Gothick Taste in the Colony of New South Wales. [footnote: Joan Kerr [and] James Broadbent, Gothick taste in the colony of New South Wales, David Ell Press in association with the Elizabeth Bay House Trust, 1980, Sydney] Kerr was offered a lectureship in 1981 at the Power Institute of Fine Arts and that same year she was made a member of the National Trust of Australia's Architectural Advisory Panel. Increasingly aware of women's contributions to Australia's cultural heritage, in 1982, Kerr published with Hugh Falkus, From Sydney Cove to Duntroon: a family album of early life in Australia and in 1983, she produced Edmund Thomas Blacket (1817–1883): Our Great Victorian Architect. By the mid-1980s Kerr was a major figure in the teaching about Australia's art and architectural history, and also in how that cultural heritage should be preserved.

Her work on the book with Falkus made Kerr aware of how little was known about Australia's artists and led her to compile her magnum opus, the Dictionary of Australian Artists: Painters, Sketchers, Photographers and Engravers to 1870. Collaborating with both professional and amateur researchers, Kerr spent thirteen years working on the project which contained nearly 2500 entries when it was published by Oxford University Press in 1992.

Kerr was elected a fellow of the Australian Academy of the Humanities in 1993 and in the mid-1990s, took a position at the University of New South Wales, as a research professor of art history. She taught art history and theory at the College of Fine Arts (CoFA) from 1994 to 1997. She and husband J. S. Kerr were co-recipients of the 1995 National Trust senior heritage award. In 1997, when the ANU launched a program in the Centre for Cross-Cultural Research on Australian art, she returned to their employ.

Kerr produced three outputs from her women’s art project with Australian Research Council funding. Heritage: The national women's art book, 500 works by 500 Australian women artists from colonial times to 1955 (1995) was published on the 20th anniversary of International Women's Year, edited with Anita Callaway. In 1995, Kerr and Jo Holder organised the National Women’s Art Exhibition of 146 exhibits, followed by their edited collection, Past and Present: The National Women’s Art Anthology (1999). She published an anthology of essays on Australia's feminist artists, Artists and Cartoonists in Black and White: the most public art (1999) drawing attention to the cultural contributions of cartoonists.

In 2003, Kerr became the second woman granted an honorary life membership to the Royal Australian Historical Society for her cultural contributions. Shortly thereafter, she was diagnosed with cancer.

Kerr died on 22 February 2004 in Sydney.

Kerr was posthumously made a Member of the Order of Australia (AM) in the 2004 Queen's Birthday Honours for "service to education and to the arts, particularly through research in the fields of architecture and art history, and through encouraging the study and recognition of Australian women artists".

== Selected works ==
- The development of the gothic taste in New South Wales: as exemplified in the churches of the colony from the beginning of settlement up to the establishment of the Victorian Gothic Revival style at the end of the 1840s (master's thesis) Sydney: University of Sydney (1975)
- (with James Broadbent) Gothick taste in the colony of New South Wales Sydney: David Ell Press in association with the Elizabeth Bay House Trust (1980)
- (with Hugh Falkus; Sophia Campbell; Marrianne Campbell) From Sydney Cove to Duntroon: a family album of early life in Australia Richmond, Australia: Hutchinson (1982)
- Our great Victorian architect Edmund Thomas Blacket (1817–1883) Sidney, N.S.W.: National Trust of Australia (1983)
- Dictionary of Australian artists, Working paper 1: Painters, photographers, and engravers. 1170–1870. A.H Sydney: Power Institute of Fine Arts, University of Sydney (1984)
- The Dictionary of Australian artists: painters, sketchers, photographers and engravers to 1870 Melbourne; New York: Oxford University Press (1992)
- The National Women's Art Book (1995, editor), published to accompany a major exhibition at the National Gallery of Australia, Women Hold Up Half the Sky
- Heritage: the national women's art book: 500 works by 500 Australian women artists from colonial times to 1955 Australia: Craftsman House (1995)
- Artists and cartoonists in black and white: the most public art Sydney: S.H. Ervin Gallery, National Trust of Australia (1999)
- (with Jo Holder, eds.) Past present: the national women's art anthology Sydney, Australia: Craftsman House (1999)
