= Rotary Art Spectacular =

The Rotary Art Spectacular is an annual art exhibition held in Brisbane, Queensland, and hosted by the Rotary Clubs of Stones Corner, Hamilton and Brisbane High-Rise.

== History ==
The first edition of the Rotary Art Spectacular was launched in 1979.

The 2020 edition of the event was cancelled to the covid-19 outbreak.

== Description ==
Rotary Art Spectacular is a non-for-profit based in New Farm, Queensland, Australia. The event is a week-long exhibition with opening night and an online gallery.

The exhibition has raised nearly $2 million for Brisbane Rotary community projects and local charities. Past beneficiaries include: the Heart Foundation, ROMAC, Drug ARM and the Cerebral Palsy League of Queensland. The 2018 beneficiaries are the AEIOU Foundation and the Rotary Clubs of Brisbane High–Rise, Hamilton and Stones Corner.

Since 2015, the event's curator has been Brett Lethbridge, an artist and the owner of Lethbridge Gallery in Paddington, Brisbane. Before 2015, the curator was Kim Slater.

== Awards ==
Awards are presented during opening night. These awards include a monetary prize. The awards are judged by a panel of art professionals.

Some of the awards include:

- Best of Show Prize Sponsored by Reliance - $10,000
- People's Choice Prize Sponsored by Aurizon - $1,000
- Best Oil Prize - $1,000
- Best Acrylic Prize - $1,000
- Best Watercolour Prize - $1,000
- Best 3D work Prize - $1,000

== Past winners ==
Year	Prize	Winner	Title	Method
2014	Best of Show	Juliet Mackie	Turquoise - Flow	N/A
2014	Best Watercolour	Philip Gough	The Daisy Dress	N/A
2014	Best 3D Artwork	David Veal	Dodecagon Glass Topped Dining Table	N/A
2014	Best Mixed/Other Media	Cherie Durant	Gifts From Above	N/A
2014	Best Oil/Acrylic	Otto Schmidinger	Forgotten	N/A
2015	Best of Show	J Valenzuela Didi	Einstein two ways of reckoning'	Acrylic on canvas
2015	People's Choice	Janet Carew	Hoppla Time'	Acrylic on canvas
2015	Best Acrylic	Mary Conder	Last Fuel Stop	Acrylic
2015	Best Watercolour	Olivia Bailey	Chefs'	Watercolour
2015	Best 3D work	Zygmunt Libucha	The morning after	Marble
2015	Best Mixed/Other Medium	Jan Hodgson	Favourite fruits	Pastel
2016	Best of Show	Anne-Marie Zanetti	Mandarin 12	Mixed/Other
2016	People's Choice	Julie Christensen	Dancing Poppy 2	Mixed/Other
2016	Best Watercolour	Pat Hall	Gum	Watercolour
2016	Best Oil	Kristian T Mumford	Alley	Oil
2016	Best 3D	Carolyn V Watson	Homebody	Mixed/Other
2016	Best Acrylic	Anita West	Eucalypt Blossom	Acrylic
2016	Best Mixed/Other Medium	Donna Malone	Brothers and their Pony	Mixed/Other
