= Anatjari Tjakamarra =

Australian artist (1930–1992)

Anatjari Tjakamarra (1938–1992) was a Central Australian Aboriginal artist who was part of the Papunya Tula art movement. He was born in the area of Kulkuta in Pintupi country. Tjakamarra was a well-respected indigenous ritual leader and leading figure in Aboriginal art. His work is featured in major metropolitan museums, including the Metropolitan Museum of Art and the National Gallery of Victoria.

== Biography ==
Anatjari Tjakamarra who also went by Yanyatjarri or Anitjarri no.3 was a Pintupi man born around 1938 in the area of Kulkuta, southeast of Kiwirrkura in Western Australia. This location is one of the most isolated areas in Central Australia, and he was known to be one of the last people to leave this region. Tjakamarra not only identified himself as a Pintupi speaker, but was also close with speakers of the Ngaatjatjarra language and identified with that group as well.

When Tjakamarra was in his late twenties he already had two daughters and two wives, and he did not come into contact with the modern world until he was in his late thirties. He came to Papunya in the early 1966 from the Western Desert (relocated by the Weapons Research Establishment). Papunya had been established in the 1960s and was home to the Pintupi people after living semi-nomadic lives. In the early 1970s, he was working in Papunya as a school gardener when school teacher, Geoffrey Bardon began encouraging the men to paint using Western materials. This caused a major stylistic development and movement in Australian art. During his early painting period in the 1970s, Tjakamarra's main political and personal goal was to visit Yawalyurru (a Tingarri site) and protect it from mining exploration. In 1971, he became part of the original Papunya painters. Tjakamarra was most active in his paintings from around 1973–1975.

Tjakamarra left Papunya at the start of the outstation movement, establishing in Tjukula in Western Australia, southeast of his birthplace and near the Northern Territory border. He stayed there for much of the 1980s and sold his paintings independently. In 1987, he made the journey to Yawalyurru with officers and other Pintupi men. This journey had last six days in the desert which was accompanied with hot weather, insufficient water, and vehicle problems. In the late 1980s, he had returned close to his birthplace in Kiwirruka and began to work with the Papunya painters. Besides working on paintings, Tjakamarra was involved in maintenance work.

After five years of being in Papunya, Tjakamarra was one of the first artists to paint with acrylics and was able to adapt to the new medium quickly. His paintings were known to tell traditional Tingari stories. These stories featured two characters in human and animal form who traveled the desert and created sacred sites. Due to his striking compositions which featured traditional Aboriginal figures and ritual imagery, his artwork influenced the contemporary art world. His style, however, is part of a thousand-year-old tradition in Aboriginal cave art and dreaming. His art skills consisted of careful draftsmanship and precision with exquisite details. Painting was an outlet for Tjakamarra who was displaced from his tribal homelands.

Anatjari spoke very little English, and when he spoke about his artworks, he did not give much detail. Anatjari Tjakamarra died in 1992.

== Artworks ==
Man Dreaming Shield, 1972, Painting

In this piece, circles that were in the centre represented a water filled rock hole and the diagonal lines had represented sacred objects decorated by Tingarri men which were then later stolen.

A Cave Dreaming, 1972, Painting

In this Painting, Anatjari uses the colors black, white, and red which gives his painting a sharp and clear composition, this technique is known to be a key feature throughout his works.

Pakarangura, 1972, synthetic polymer powder painting

In Pakarangura, a water hole is presented in the middle along with a cave that has black, white, and red lines forming water tjuringa. The presence of the water, cave and tjuringa represents the ritual importance of water dreaming.

Possum Ancestors, 1975, Acrylic painting

The imagery in this piece is connected to the belief of Tjkumpa, or also known as "dreaming". Through this belief people believed to be connected to ancestors and also their land. The painting tells a story about two bodies that are half possum and half human who have eloped even though it goes against their people's marriage roles, eventually ending in havoc.

Yarranyanga, 1989, Acrylic painting

Yarranyanga tells the story of an ancestral allusion happening near rock holes. Once again Anatjari uses the same few colors in his painting and it's a very detailed painting with a stippled background and black and white circles painted with close precision.

Untitled, Body Paint for Initiation, 1972

Created by Tjakamarra during his early years in the Papunya movement, this piece was based on initiation ceremonies where designs were painted onto men and these designs reflected those worn by a ritual leader.

Created Tjilpi (Old man's) Corroborree 1972

Created by Anatjari in 1972 this artwork measures 64cm X 60 cm and was painted on composite board. The central roundel represents a cave and sacred site with four bull roarers or Tjuringa radiating from the central motif. The background design is related to skin designs used by the initiates.

== Exhibitions ==
After settling at Kiwirrkura late in the decade, he began working through Papunya Tula Pty Ltd. He had his first solo exhibition at Gallery Gabrielle Pizzi in 1989, and another in the same year at the John Weber Gallery in New York. The Metropolitan Museum of Art acquired his painting Tingari Dreaming Cycle in the early 1990s; this was the first purchased work of contemporary Aboriginal artwork.

== Collections ==
Tjakamarra's work is held in most major Australian collections, including the Museum and Art Gallery of the Northern Territory (MAGNT), the Art Gallery of South Australia (one work), the National Gallery of Victoria, and the Art Gallery of New South Wales (2 works).

The National Gallery of Victoria has three works by Anatjari Tjakamarra's including Big Pintupi Dreaming Ceremony (1972), Kurlkurta (1990), and Women's Dreaming at Tjukula (1991).

The National Gallery of Australia has one work by Anatjari Tjakamarra which is Emu Story (1972).

== Achievements ==
First solo exhibition in New York of 1989 by Metropolitan Museum of Art, the museum purchased one of Anatjari Tjakamarra's paintings, making it the first western desert painting to be featured in a collection of contemporary art.

In 1995 one of Tjakamarra's earliest paintings was purchased for what was at the time a record of $75,000.

Anatjari Tjakamarra is one of the best-known artists in Aboriginal art.

== See also ==
- Dreaming (Australian Aboriginal art)
- Papunya Tula
- Tingari
