= Lake Macdonald =

Lake in Western Australia and Northern Territory

- Karrkurutinyja (Pintupi-Luritja)

- Location on the Northern Territory and Western Australian border
- Interactive map of Lake Macdonald
- Location: Western Australia and Northern Territory
- Coordinates: 23°30′S 129°00′E
- Type: Salt lake
- Basin countries: Australia
- Max. length: 58 km (36 mi)
- Max. width: 23 km (14 mi)

Lake Macdonald (Pintupi: Karrkurutinyja) is an ephemeral lake that straddles the border between Western Australia and the Northern Territory. It lies south of Lake Mackay, and south-west of Kintore, Northern Territory. Lying in country inhabited by Indigenous Australians for many thousands of years, it was first visited by Europeans in 1889, as part of an expedition supported by the Royal Geographical Society of South Australia. The expedition was led by William Tietkens; its activities included the first known photographs taken of Uluru. The lake is named after the secretary of the Victorian branch of the Geographical Society at that time.

The lake marks the southern boundary of the Kiwirrkurra Indigenous Protected Area.

The land around Karrkurutinyja was the birthplace of contemporary Indigenous Australian artists including Yala Yala Gibbs Tjungarrayi, Shorty Lungkarta Tjungurrayi and Narputta Nangala, mother of Daisy Jugadai Napaltjarri.

== See also ==
- Tietkens expedition of 1889
