= Haasts Bluff, Northern Territory =

Community in the Northern Territory, Australia

Coordinates: 23°26′49″S 131°52′56″E

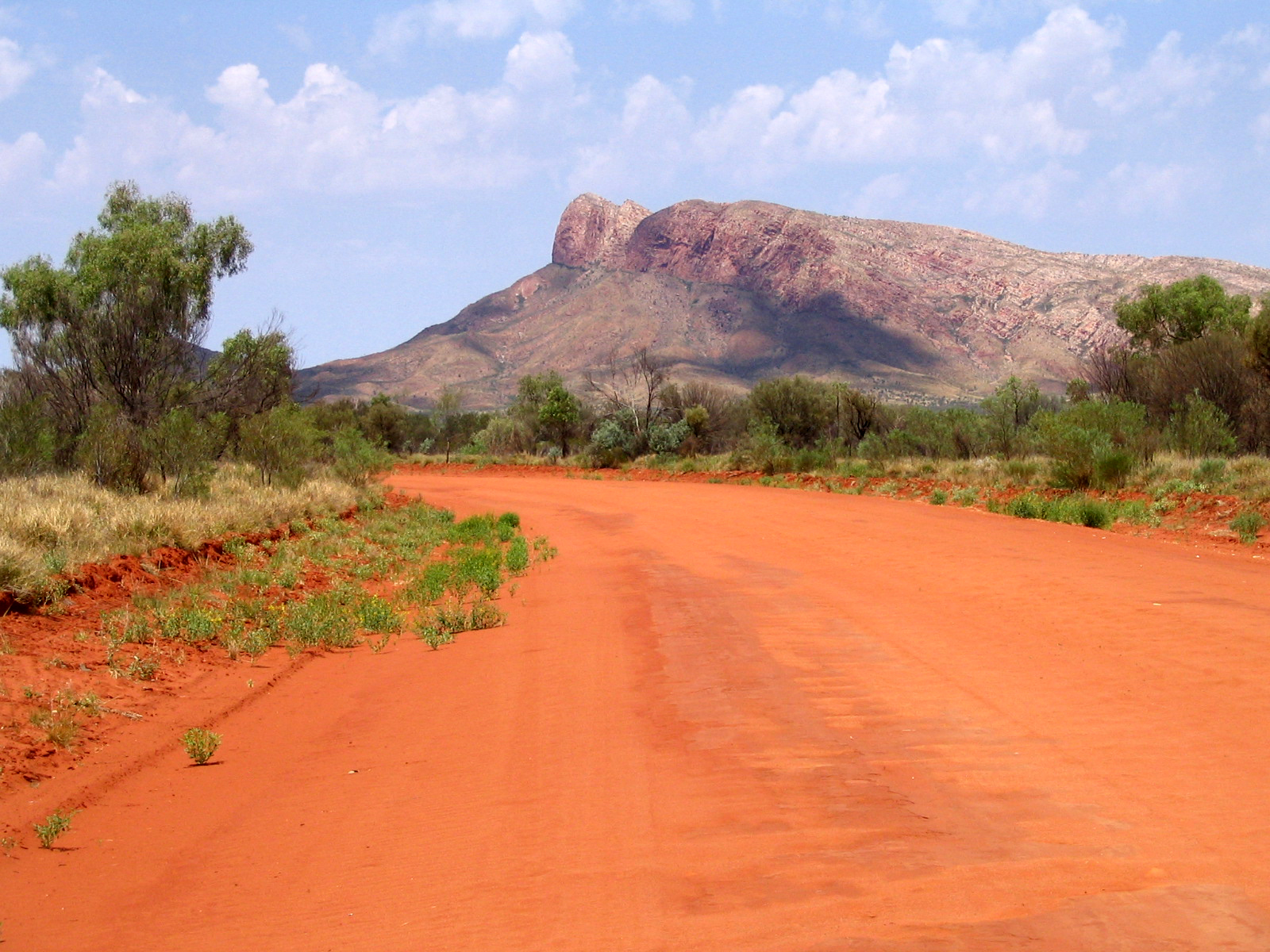
Haasts Bluff west of Alice Springs in the Northern Territory, Australia

Haasts Bluff, also known as Ikuntji, is an Aboriginal Australian community in Central Australia, a region of the Northern Territory. The community is located in the MacDonnell Shire local government area, 227 kilometres (141 mi) west of Alice Springs. At the 2006 census, the community, including outstations, had a population of 207.

== History ==
The Haasts Bluff community takes its name from the nearby outcrop, given this name in 1872 by the explorer Ernest Giles, after the German-born New Zealand geologist, Julius von Haast.

The locality was established as a Lutheran mission in 1946, and is home to Western Arrernte, Pintupi and Pitjantjatjara people.

The term "Finke River Mission" was initially an alternative name for the Hermannsburg Mission, but this name was later often used to include the settlements at Haasts Bluff, Areyonga and, later, Papunya. It now refers to all Lutheran missionary activity in Central Australia since the first mission was established at Hermannsburg in 1877.

== Art ==
A number of notable Indigenous artists were born, raised, or lived at Haasts Bluff, including Makinti Napanangka, Daisy Jugadai Napaltjarri, Tjunkiya Napaltjarri, Wintjiya Napaltjarri, Eileen Napaltjarri, Nora Andy Napaltjarri, Ada Andy Napaltjarri, Ngoia Pollard Napaltjarri, Molly Jugadai Napaltjarri, Norah Nelson Napaljarri, Doris Bush Nungarrayi, Bill Whiskey Tjapaltjarri, and Turkey Tolson Tjupurrula.

=== Ikuntji Artists ===
Ikuntji Artists is a not-for-profit Aboriginal art centre, run by a board of seven Indigenous directors. It was the first art centre established by women in the Western Desert Art Movement, starting out as a women's centre in 1992. Molly Jugadai Napaltjarri played a significant role in its establishment as an art centre, with the assistance of Marina Strocchi.

The centre was incorporated as Ikuntji Artists Aboriginal Corporation in 2005, and many of the artists' works are now represented in national and international collections. Around 100 local artists are represented by the centre.

In 2019, Ikuntji artist Eunice Napanangka Jack won the Vincent Lingiari Art Award for her painting titled Kuruyultu, which is the name of her birthplace.

Singer Jessica Mauboy, Minister for Indigenous Australians Linda Burney, and Australian comedian Celeste Barber have worn clothing featuring design by Ikuntji, and Ikuntji art has been displayed in Europe. In September 2022, artists Keturah Zimran and Roseranna Larry travelled to Paris, France, where their designs were being showcased in fashion shows.

A book, Ikuntji Textiles, was launched in September 2022 at the Museum of Contemporary Art Australia in Sydney.
