= Vivien Johnson =

Australian sociologist

Vivien Joan Johnson FAHA (born 1949) is an Australian sociologist, writer on Indigenous Australian art, curator, teacher and former editor-in-chief of the Dictionary of Australian Artists Online. Based in Sydney, her work frequently focuses on the community of Papunya in the Northern Territory. Johnson's research integrates sociological, anthropological, philosophical, and art historical approaches, with a focus on Indigenous cultural and intellectual property rights.

== Achievements ==
Johnson was elected a Fellow of the Australian Academy of the Humanities in 1998.

Johnson curated the 2003–2005 Clifford Possum Tjapaltjarri national touring retrospective and the 2007–2008 National Museum of Australia's Papunya Painting: out of the desert which toured to Sydney and Beijing.

In 2005 she was made Professor of New Media Narrative and Theory at the University of New South Wales. As of 2021 she is Adjunct Art and Design Professor.

In 2020 Johnson was made a National Library of Australia fellow looking at Writing Papunya: The Making of an Illustrated Vernacular Literature 1974-1991

Between 2009 and 2026 Johnson worked on a revitalisation work on the collection of Papunya Literature Production Centre resources at Papunya which resulted in a new publication and a large scale exhibition Wangka Walytja which began travelling in 2024.

She was a longtime friend of artist Kumantje Jagamara, and spoke at his funeral in March 2021.

== Select publications ==
- The art of Clifford Possum Tjapaltjarri (1994)
- Western Desert Artists: A Biographical Dictionary (1995)
- Lives of the Papunya Tula Artists (2008)
- Once Upon a Time in Papunya (2010)
- Streets of Papunya : the re-invention of Papunya painting (2015)
- Wangka Walytja: the life and times of the Papunya Literature Production Centre (2026)

Johnson has also published over 100 articles in art and academic journals.
