= Gabrielle Pizzi =

Australian art dealer

Gabrielle Pizzi (1940 – 5 December 2004), born Gabrielle Wren, was an Australian art dealer who promoted Aboriginal art from the Western Desert from the early 1980s. She created the Gallery Gabrielle Pizzi in Melbourne in 1987.

In 1990, Gabrielle Pizzi took contemporary Aboriginal art, including that of Anatjari Tjakamarra, to the Venice Biennale and to Madrid. Pizzi curated 11 Contemporary Aboriginal Artists for the 1990 Australian Pavilion.

== Early life ==
Born Gabrielle Wren in Sydney, she moved to Hobart when she was five years old. Later she moved to Melbourne as a teenager. She was the daughter of Norah and Anthony Wren; her father was one of the eight children of John Wren.

== Career ==
Pizzi created Gallery Gabrielle Pizzi in 1987 in Flinders Lane, Melbourne, showing Western Desert art from Papunya Tula and Yuendumu. She held exhibitions there every three weeks for around 20 years.

She worked with art advisers from community art centres, ensuring that artists were paid correctly and new artists supported. Pizzi was known as a woman with great integrity who treated the artists with enormous respect.

Pizzi was a pioneer in the Aboriginal art world and made it her life's mission to have Aboriginal art accepted as powerful contemporary art, and since 1990, regularly curated exhibitions of Australian Aboriginal art internationally. Australian Art Collector wrote “Pizzi stands alone among commercial dealers in her longstanding efforts to take Aboriginal art to the world", and described her as being "instrumental in securing its international profile". She brought the work of artists such as Ronnie Tjampitjinpa, Mick Namarari Tjapaltjarri and Emily Kame Kngwarreye to the world, showing Aboriginal art in exhibitions in Venice, Bangalore, Moscow, and Jerusalem. She also showed artists from Maningrida, including John Mawurndjul, James Iyuna and Jimmy An.gunguna.

Pizzi donated 21 works of Aboriginal art and fashion to the National Gallery of Victoria.

In addition to her career as an art dealer, Pizzi was an activist for animal rights and Palestinian rights in Israel.

== Death ==
Pizzi died of cancer after eighteen months' illness. She was survived by her daughter, Samantha.
