= Marina Strocchi =

Australian artist

Marina Strocchi (born 28 December 1961) is an internationally-exhibited Australian painter and printmaker whose work is held in many national collections. Strocchi is based in Alice Springs and has worked extensively with Aboriginal artists in Central Australia.

== Early life ==
Strocchi was born on 28 December 1961 to an Italian father and Australian mother in Melbourne and was interested in art from a young age. After finishing school, Strocchi studied a Bachelor of Art at Swinburne Technical College, where she completed a graphic design degree (1979–1982). In the years following she travelled extensively before choosing to move, for two years, to Paris.

In 1987 she returned from an extended visit to Paris and Mexico following the death of her father.

== Life in the Northern Territory ==
In January 1992 Strocchi visited Central Australia for the first time. She spent two weeks at Haasts Bluff, where she delivered impromptu painting and printmaking workshops and began painting a series of small desert landscapes.

In August 1992 Strocchi returned to Haasts Bluff where she and her partner Wayne Eager established what became known as Ikuntji Art Centre, where she worked from 1992 to 1997. Throughout her time here Strocchi continued her to paint and exhibit.

After leaving Haasts Bluff, Strocchi moved to Alice Springs, continued to work with artists through a number of different organisations; including Batchelor Institute of Indigenous Tertiary Education, Charles Darwin University, Irruntju Artists, Iwantja Arts, Ninuku Arts, Papunya Tula Artists, Tangentyere Artists, Tjanpi Desert Weavers and Warlukurlangu Artists.

Strocchi has also had solo success and has held 45 solo exhibitions throughout Australia and in the United States and collections of her work is held in a number of state and national collections as well as in private and corporate collections including Artbank, Araluen Arts Centre, Art Gallery of Western Australia, National Gallery of Australia, Museum and Art Gallery of the Northern Territory and National Gallery of Victoria.

Strocchi has a distinctive style and Professor Sasha Grishin says:

"You can recognise a painting, print, or drawing by Marina Strocchi at twenty paces, the style is unconventional—something naive in its demarcation, generally warm in its colour palette, finely worked in its detail and frequently tinged with a sense of humour—yet there are no close lookalikes, her work does not remind yourself of someone else's art."

— Professor Sasha Grishin, Marina Strocchi : a survey 1992–2014 (2015)

Strocchi relocated to the Yarra Valley (Wurundjeri Country) in 2021.

== Accolades ==
Strocchi has won numerous awards, including the Broken Hill Art Award, Brisbane Rotary Art Spectacular, and the Country Women's Association Tennant Creek Art Award. She has also been a finalist in the Alice Prize, Togart Contemporary Art Award, Tattersall's Club Landscape Art Prize and the Waterhouse Natural Science Art Prize.

She was also the recipient of the Northern Territory Government's Arts Fellowship Program in 2019. This allowed her to spend three months in New York, where she developed a new body of work and explored the museums and art galleries in the region.

== Publications about ==
A survey of Strocchi's work was published in 2015 in "Marina Strocchi : a survey 1992-2014" This survey was produced in conjunction with an exhibition at the Araluen Arts Centre which was held between 26 February - 12 April 2015.
