= Papunya Tula =

Aboriginal art cooperative and art movement in the Northern Territory

Papunya Tula, registered as Papunya Tula Artists Pty Ltd, is an artist cooperative formed in 1972 in Papunya, Northern Territory, owned and operated by Aboriginal people from the Western Desert of Australia. The group is known for its innovative work with the Western Desert Art Movement, popularly referred to as dot painting. Credited with bringing contemporary Aboriginal art to world attention, its artists inspired many other Australian Aboriginal artists and their styles.

The company operates today out of Alice Springs and its artists are drawn from a large area, extending into Western Australia, 700 kilometres (430 mi) west of Alice Springs.

== Background ==
In the late 1960s, the Australian Government moved several different groups living in the Western Desert region to Papunya, 240 km (150 mi) north-west of Alice Springs in the Northern Territory, to remove them from cattle lands and assimilate them into western culture. These displaced groups were primarily Pintupi, Luritja, Walpiri, Arrernte, and Anmatyerre groups.

In 1971, Geoffrey Bardon, the school teacher at the community, encouraged the children to paint a mural using the traditional style of body and sand ceremonial art. This painting style was used for spiritual purposes, and so had strict protocols for its use. Many symbols depicted personal totems and Dreamings, and others more general Dreamtime creation stories. When some of the elder men saw what the children were doing, they felt the subject matter was more suited to adults. They began creating a mural depicting the Honey Ant Dreaming. Traditionally, Papunya is the epicentre of the Honey Ant Dreaming, where songlines converge. The European-Australian administrators of Papunya later painted over the murals, which the curator Judith Ryan called "an act of cultural vandalism", noting that "[t]he school was de-Aboriginalized and the art no longer allowed to stand tall and defiant as the symbol of a resilient and indomitable people". While visible, the mural proved highly influential, leading other men to create smaller paintings of their Jukurrpa (Ancestral stories), on any available surface, including bits of old masonite, car bonnets, tin cans, and matchboxes. This explosion of artistic activity is generally regarded as the origin of contemporary Indigenous Australian art.

The collective, originally entirely Aboriginal Australian men, formed in 1972. They derived the name tula from a small hill near Papunya, a Honey Ant Dreaming site. A few women, notably Pansy Napangardi, began to paint for the company in the late 1980s. It was not until 1994 that women generally began to participate.

While the collective artists used a style of painting traditional in the sand and for body adornment in ceremonies, most of them had never painted before in Western style – that is, using acrylic paint and a hard surface. As their work gained in popularity, the artists omitted or changed many of the spiritual symbols for public viewing, as the Aboriginal community criticised the artists for revealing "too much of their sacred heritage". According to Ryan:

Secret designs restricted to a ritual context were now in the market place, made visible to kardiya outsiders and Aboriginal women. In response to these objections, all detailed depictions of human figures, fully decorated tjurungas (bullroarers) and ceremonial paraphernalia were removed or modified. Such designs and their "inside" meanings were not to be written down and "traded". Any contravention broke the immutable plan of descent, the link of the initiated men with his totemic ancestor through his father and his father's father. From 1973 to 1975, Papunya Tula artists sought to camouflage overt references to ceremony and became reticent. They revealed less of the sacred heart of their culture. The openness of the Bardon era was at an end. Dotting and over-dotting, as an ideal means of concealing or painting over dangerous, secret designs, became a fashion at this stage. The art was made public, watered down for general exhibition, pointing to the uniqueness of the Geoffrey Bardon years - which like innocence, cannot be rediscovered.

For Hetti Perkins and Hannah Fink, the artists through their paintings "trace the genealogies of their ancestral inheritance". And comment that "Through the paintings of the Papunya Tula Artists we experience the anguish of exile and the liberation of exodus. ... In refiguring the Australian landscape, the artists express what has always been known to them. And in revealing this vision to an outside audience, Papunya Tula artists have reclaimed the interior of the Australian continent as Aboriginal land. If exile is the dream of home, the physical longing for homelands expressed in the early paintings has now been answered".

In the late 1970s and early 1980s, after the establishment of the Aboriginal Land Rights Act 1976, many of the people left Papunya for their traditional lands, but the art cooperative persisted and continued to grow. For many years the market and museums virtually ignored their work. A major exception was the Museum and Art Gallery of the Northern Territory (MAGNT), that has the largest collection of just over 220 early works acquired between 1972 and 1976, thanks to the visionary efforts of the MAGNT Director Dr Colin Jack Hinton and Alice Springs gallery owner Pat Hogan. This was still as of 2008 the nation's largest collection of early boards. The National Gallery of Victoria did not acquire any works produced by the collective until 1987, when Judith Ryan convinced the current director to purchase 10 of the works. At the time, the asking price was A$100,000, which Ryan described in 2008 as "a steal", given the escalation in value.

In 2007, a single painting by Papunya Tula artist Clifford Possum Tjapaltjarri set a record at auction for price commanded for Aboriginal art, bringing £1.03 million (or $2.4 million), more than twice as much as the previous record-holder.

== Today ==
The company now operates out of Alice Springs, and covers an enormous area, extending into Western Australia, 700 kilometres (430 mi) west of Alice Springs.

== Exhibitions ==
=== Art Gallery of NSW 2000 Exhibition ===
In 2000, the Art Gallery of NSW held an exhibition, curated by Hetti Perkins, for the Sydney Olympic Games Arts Festival. The exhibition, entitled Papunya Tula, Genesis and Genius, was the first major retrospective exhibition of the cooperative.

=== National Museum of Australia 2007–2008 Exhibition ===
For a period of several months (27 November 2007 to 3 February 2008), the National Museum of Australia exhibited a collection of Papunya paintings from the first few years of the movement. Most of the works displayed in the collection had not been seen before by the general public as most of these paintings were bought by the Aboriginal Arts Board (now defunct) of the 1970s-1980s. The exhibition contains some of the most priceless and earliest works by the first generation, senior Papunya painters. These paintings were previously displayed in government offices and embassies. Curated by Professor Vivien Johnson, the exhibition was significant in introducing the movement's importance to the general audience.

=== Musée du Quai Branly ===
Two Papunya artists, Tommy Watson and Ningura Napurrula, are also represented in Paris at the Musée du Quai Branly, dedicated to indigenous art of the world. Napurrula's signature black-and-white motifs appear superimposed on the ceiling of the administration offices of the museum's building.

== Papunya Tula artists ==
=== First generation men (the Bardon years 1971–73) ===
- Anatjari Tjakamarra
- Billy Stockman Tjapaltjarri
- Charlie Tarawa (Tjaruru) Tjungurrayi
- Charlie Tjakamarra
- Charlie Egalie Tjapaltjarri
- Clifford Possum Tjapaltjarri
- David Corby Tjapaltjarri
- Dinny Nolan Tjampitjinpa
- Freddy West Tjakamarra
- Johnny Scobie Tjapanangka
- Johnny Warrangkula Tjupurrula
- Kaapa Tjampitjinpa
- Long Jack Phillipus Tjakamarra
- Mick Namarari Tjapaltjarri
- Old Mick Tjakamarra
- Old Tutama Tjapangati
- Old Walter Tjampitjinpa (Lynch)
- Pinta Pinta Tjapanangka
- Shorty Lungkata Tjungurayyi
- Tim Leura Tjapaltjarri
- Timmy Payungka Tjapangati
- Turkey Tolson Tjupurrula
- Uta Uta Tjangala
- Yala Yala Gibbs Tjungurayyi

=== Second generation men ===
- Adam Gibbs Tjapaltjarri
- Andrew Tolson Tjakamarra
- Bobby West Tjupurrula
- Charlie Tjapangati
- Charlie Wallabi Tjungurrayi
- Donald Matthews Tjapanangka
- George Tjampu Tjapaltjarri
- George Tjungurayi
- George Ward Tjungurayi
- James Gibson Tjapaltjarri
- Jeremiah West Tjakamarra
- John Corby Tjapaltjarri
- Johnny Yungut Tjupurrula
- Joseph Jurra Tjapaltjarri
- Kanya Tjapangati
- Kenny Williams Tjampitjinpa
- Kumantje Jagamara, a.k.a. Michael Nelson Tjakamarra (1946–2020), joined 1983
- Lindsay Corby Tjapaltjarri
- Long Jack Phillippus Tjakamarra
- Matthew West Tjupurrula
- Morris Gibson Tjapaltjarri
- Patrick Tjungurrayi
- Ray James Tjangala
- Raymond Maxwell Tjampitjinpa
- Raymond Tjapaltjarri
- Richard Yukenbarri Tjakamarra
- Ronnie Tjampitjinpa
- Tony Tjakamarra
- Warlimpirrnga Tjapaltjarri

=== Women ===
- Bombatu Napangati
- Doreen Reid Nakamarra
- Eileen Napaltjarri
- Kawayi Nampitjinpa
- Elizabeth Marks Nakamarra
- Josephine Napurrula
- Kim Napurrula
- Lorna Brown Napanangka
- Maisie Gibson Napurrula
- Makinti Napanangka
- Mary Brown Napangati
- Miriam Napanangka
- Monica Napaltjarri
- Naata Nungurrayi
- Nancy Nungurrayi
- Narrabri Nakamarra
- Ningura Napurrula
- Norah Nelson Napaljarri
- Nyurapayia Nampitjinpa
- Pansy Napangardi
- Pantjiya Nungurrayi
- Patricia Napanangka
- Payu Napaltjarri
- Tatali Napurrula
- Tjunkiya Napaltjarri
- Walangkura Napanangka
- Yalti Napangati
- Yukultji Napangati
- Yuyuya Nampitjinpa

== See also ==
- Australian Aboriginal art
- Geoffrey Bardon
- Honey ant dreaming
- Kluge-Ruhe Aboriginal Art Collection
- Papunya
- Toas
