= 65,000 Years: A Short History of Australian Art =

2025 Indigenous Australian art exhibition

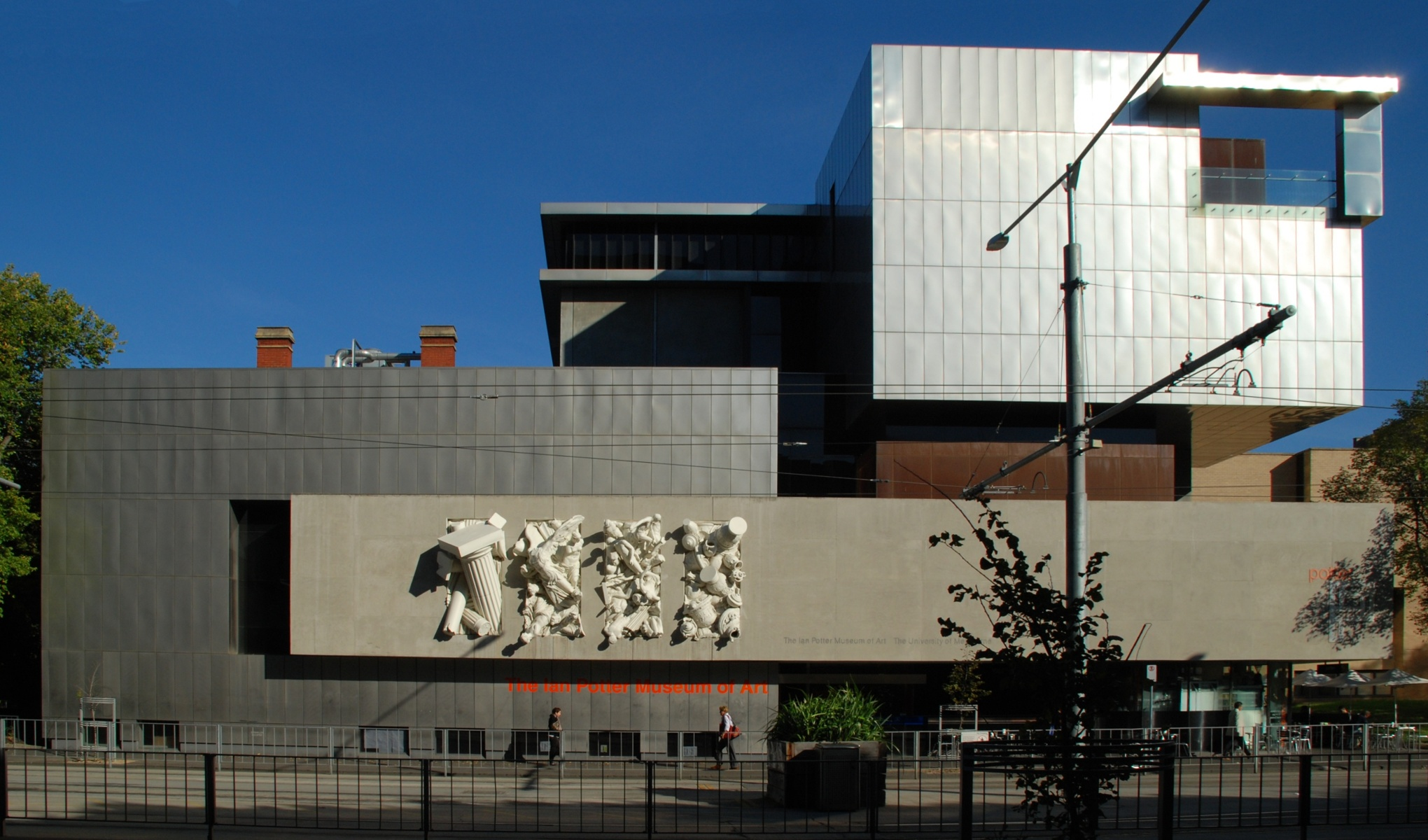
Potter Museum of Art in 2010

65,000 Years: A Short History of Australian Art is an exhibition of Indigenous Australian art at the University of Melbourne's Potter Museum of Art, running between 30 May and 22 November 2025.

400 works by 200 artists are exhibited, curated by Judith Ryan, Shanysa McConville and Marcia Langton. The exhibition draws on collections from the university, and 193 loans from 77 private and public collectors. Artists exhibited include Albert Namatjira, Emily Kame Kngwarreye, Judy Watson and William Barak. The curators also commissioned works from Indigenous artists across Australia, including from Trawlwoolway (Tasmania), Wiradjuri (Victoria) and Aṉangu (Central Western desert) artists.

The exhibition is named ironically, a comment on what the curators viewed as the overdue reevaluation in the 20th century of Indigenous Australian art as art. They envisaged a "truth-telling" function to displaying the works, covering topics such as Australia's frontier wars and the university's eugenics practices. Accompanying works are labels which identify Indigenous subjects, done in the hopes that Indigenous patrons would be able to identify their ancestors, and those they had connections to.

== Development ==
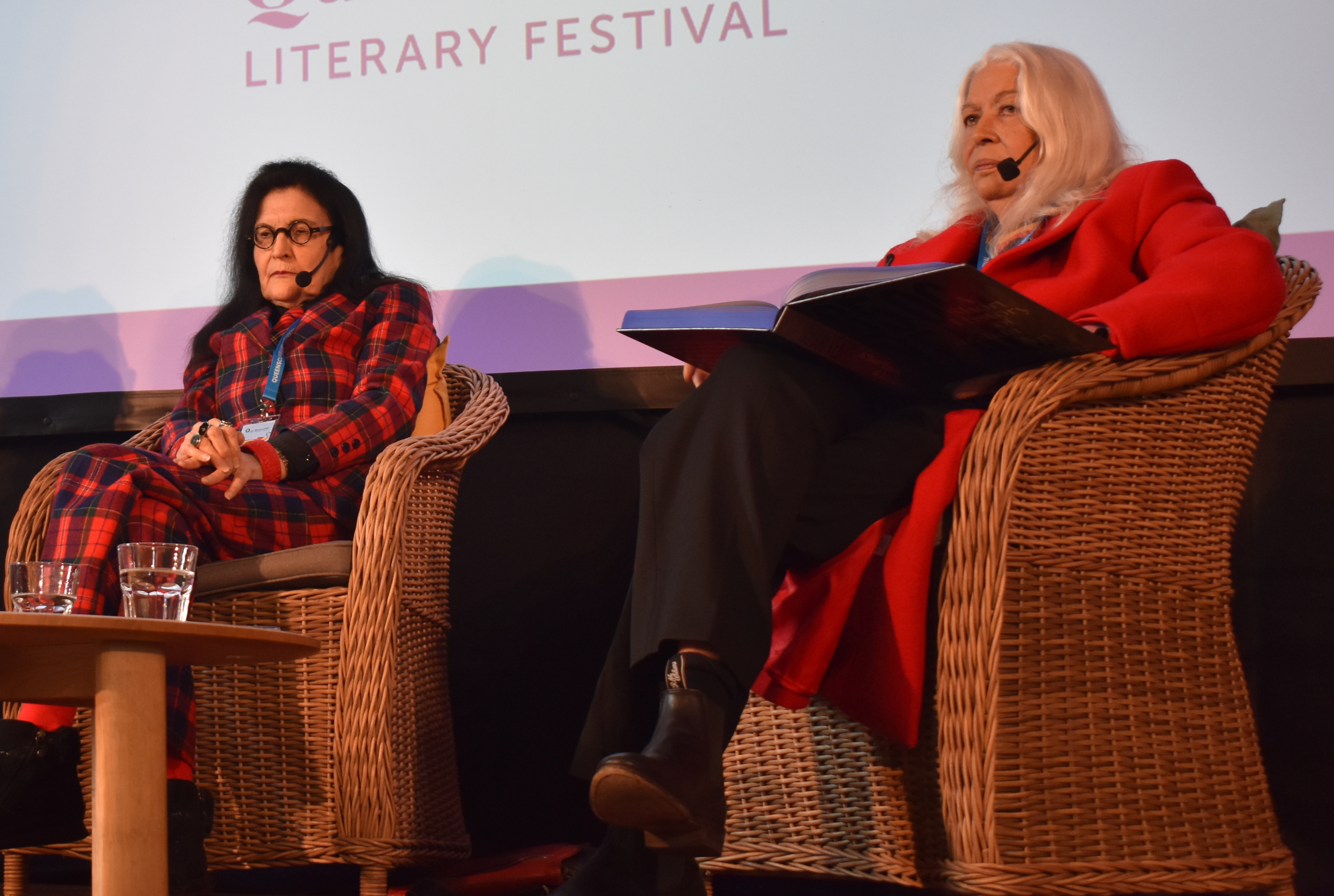
Judith Ryan (left) and Marcia Langton (right), co-curators of the exhibition

Development of 65,000 Years: A Short History of Australian Art began around 2015, when the head of the Potter Museum of Art asked Australian Aboriginal scholar Marcia Langton to curate an exhibition using the University of Melbourne's collection of Aboriginal and Torres Strait Islander works. Beginning her work, Langton sought to build the exhibition around a "masterwork" for different genres and eras, but was met with gaps in the collection, including contemporary art from large areas of northern Australia, any works from Tasmania or Torres Straits, and relatively few works by women. She attributed this unevenness to a haphazard approach to acquisition, and set out to fill the gaps for the exhibition.

By 2021, Langton describes herself as feeling overwhelmed and wanting assistance from an expert in curation of works by Aboriginal artists inside and outside of Australia. For this she enlisted Judith Ryan, a senior curator who had recently retired from a 44-year career at the National Gallery of Victoria. The same year, associate curator Shanysa McConville was brought on, and she assumed responsibility for managing archival documents. Over the following four years, the curators engaged in extensive community consultation. In 2025, 65,000 Years: A Short History of Australian Art opened to the public. With the opening of the exhibition coincided the re-opening of the Potter Museum, which had been closed since 2018 for renovations.

== Layout ==
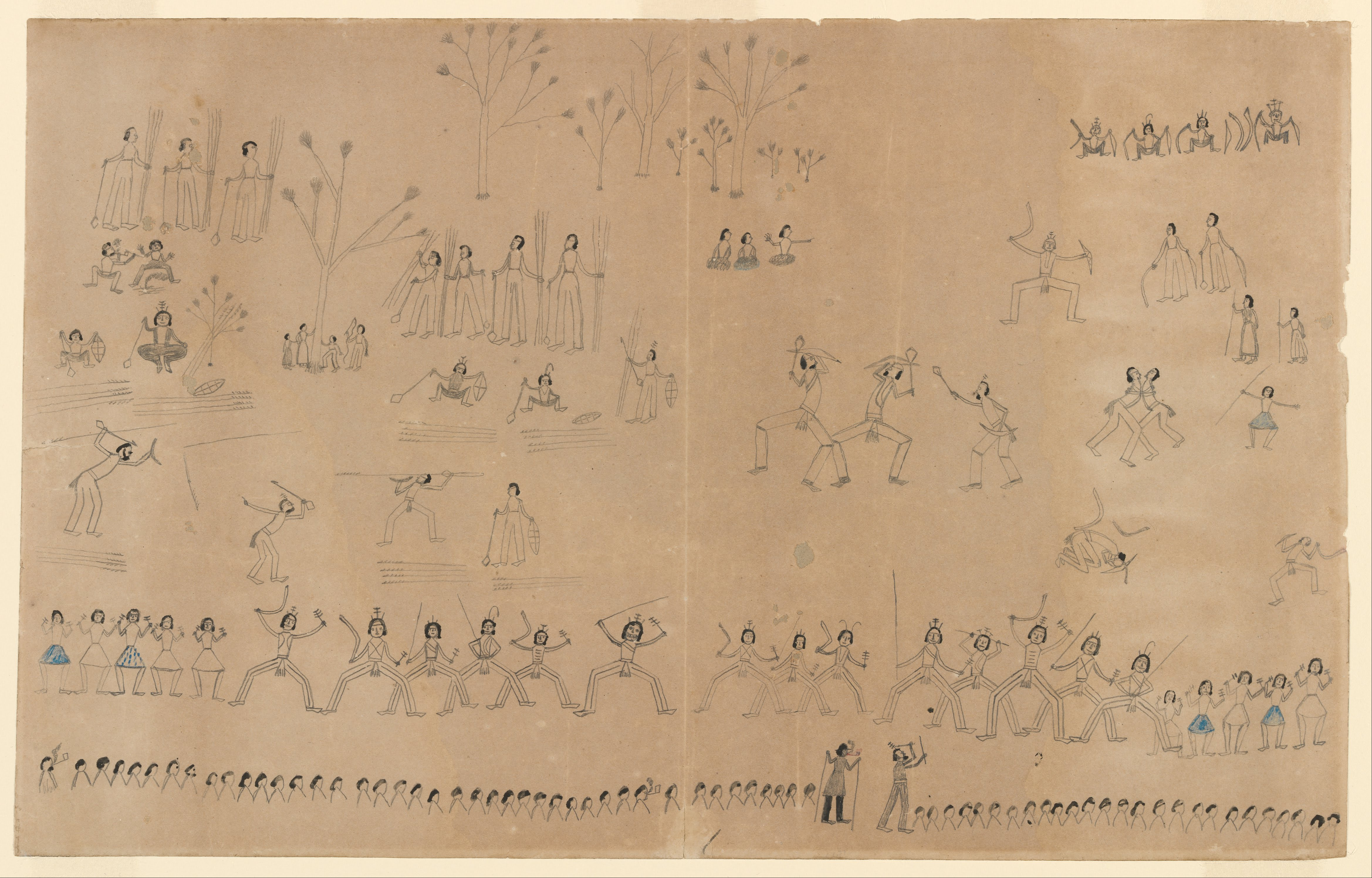
Works of Mickey of Ulladulla are displayed on the ground floor

65,000 Years: A Short History of Australian Art is exhibited across three floors in eleven rooms, moving between geography and time periods. In The Guardian, art critic Tim Byrne describes an upwards journey between floors, ascending from Tasmania at the ground floor to the night sky at the top.

At the ground-floor entrance, a virtual display depicts the area as it would have appeared before the arrival of Europeans over a nine-hour, looping video. This was generated by Kooma artist Brett Leavy, using information drawn from CSIRO soil maps, archival documents and artworks, and Geoscience Australia data. Inside, the first-floor is primarily themed around images of early contact between Europeans and Indigenous Australians, the exception seen in a central atrium connecting the ground and upper floors. This space is filled with woven works, women's baskets and "sun-mats", produced by women both anonymous and specially commissioned. In explaining her thinking behind this placement, Langton said she wanted women "to be at the heart of the building, because women sustain life".

Multiple rooms on the second floor are dedicated to bark paintings from north-eastern Arnhem Land and Groote Eylandt depicting pre-First Fleet contact during the Janszoon voyage of 1605–1606 and the Makassan contact with Australia. Another room, off-limits to children, is labelled the "Dark Heart". Laid out like a 20th-century laboratory, it covers the subject of eugenics at the University of Melbourne— bones and instruments drawn from the university's archives are laid out, and on the wall hangs a portrait of Richard J. A. Berry, a 20th-century professor of anatomy at the university. Interspersed are works by contemporary artists, including Brook Andrew, Julie Dowling, and Yhonnie Scarce, interpreting the theme.

On the top floor, works centre around astronomy. Sculptures of the Seven Sisters produced by the Tjanpi Desert Weavers occupy one such room.

== Reception ==
The exhibition's opening was received enthusiastically by art historian Roger Benjamin, who exclaimed that it "exceeded all expectations". Benjamin praised the curators ambitions, handling of sensitive historical material, and aesthetic presentation. At the ABC, journalist Virginia Trioli was effusive, describing the Langton, Ryan, and McConville as "brilliant, insightful and dedicated" in their work, and in The Saturday Paper, Aboriginal Australian novelist Claire G. Coleman, described the exhibition as "almost certainly one of the greatest survey exhibitions of Indigenous art". For Coleman, the displayed works illustrated the scale of time people were in Australia before European-contact and after, creating a presentation that was "how exhibitions of Australian art should be: focused on Indigenous art with a smattering of whitefella works needed to tell the story".

Several other reviewers agreed. In a five-star review of the exhibition, Tim Stone for The Art Newspaper found the exhibition's displays as giving insight into a broad history of Australia, describing both violent racism and "the story of resilience, reinvention and efforts to tell the truth." In The Guardian, Byrne praised the exhibition's treatment of material dealing with historical examples of racism as "powerful but respectful" and "disturbing" but "necessary". Art critic John McDonald gave a dissenting view in The Australian. He expressed disappointment in what he saw as a failure to present a survey of Indigenous Australian art, instead describing a "polemic" emphasis on history as "reducing to a sideshow the art component." Speaking generally, he rejected the idea that the show's anti-colonial content was novel in the contemporary Australian art scene, and described the inability to display rock art as necessarily weakening a display of Indigenous Australian art.

== Book ==
Accompanying the exhibition, a 340-page book co-edited by Langton and Ryan was published by Thames & Hudson Australia, made up of 25 essays by Indigenous and non-Indigenous artists. The text covered works created by Aboriginal and Torres Strait Islanders in the period after the arrival of the First Fleet. An introduction by Langton frames the text as an anti-colonial statement. Several essays focus on the impact of encounters between Europeans and Aboriginal Australians had on each other's visual art. Numerous emphasize the role of archives and their biases. The majority of the book, over 14 chapters, focuses on 20th century Indigenous Australian art, and its recognition in this period as art rather than ethnographic artifact.

Benjamin highlighted an essay by art writer Grazia Gunn, which he described as "pungent". Coleman praised the book as in-depth yet accessible. In a more detailed review for Art Guide Australia, writer Jane O'Sullivan describes the book as "one of the most remarkable art histories we've seen". O'Sullivan praised the book's fluid structure, and as an overview text described the book as a welcome contribution among texts published on Indigenous Australian art. Repeatedly, she praised the author's ambitions.

Concluding a 3,500 word review in Artlink, John Kean describes the book as "dense, fascinating and packed with compelling images". Kean identifies a central thesis the book puts forward, that Indigenous Australian art is defined by a "continuity of cultural expression", established by essayists by discussing well-known Indigenous figures in relation to their communities. On the book's scope, Kean rejects the idea that the book aims to be "encyclopedic", saying it sacrifices attention on marginal art scenes such as that of the Tiwi Islands and southwest Western Australia in order to give deeper attention to the most well-known movements. In later essays by younger Indigenous writers, Kean describes themes of "resistance, activism, affiliation with Country and gender", not constrained by region. Finally, Kean opines on a tension he identifies behind 65,000 Years as "an act of redemptive truth-telling on the part of the University" or anti-colonial in character, Kean finds in favour of the latter, sceptical of such acts from a university with various stakeholders.

== Selected artists on display ==
- Augustus Earle
- Betty Muffler
- Brook Andrew
- Carlene West
- Charles Rodius
- Emily Kame Kngwarreye
- Ginger Riley Munduwalawala
- Gordon Bennett
- John Glover
- Johnny Warangkula Tjupurrula
- Joseph Lycett
- Julie Dowling
- Justus Jorgensen
- Marcia Langton
- Mickey of Ulladulla
- Naomi Hobson
- Port Jackson Painter
- Richard Browne
- Rover Thomas
- Tjanpi Desert Weavers
- Tommy McRae
- Vincent Namatjira
- William Barak
- Wonggu Mununggurr
- Yhonnie Scarce
