= Adam Knight =

Australian art curator and dealer

- Born: Tallarook, Victoria, Australia
- Occupation: Art consultant

Adam Knight is an Australian art curator and dealer. He has operated seven commercial art galleries and is the owner of the Mitchelton Gallery of Aboriginal Art, located in Taungurung country outside Nagambie in Victoria, Australia.

Knight has influenced the careers of some of the most important Aboriginal Australian artists, including Clifford Possum Tjapaltjarri, Rover Thomas, Ningura Napurrula, Gabriella Possum Nungurrayi, Naata Nungurrayi, Yannima Tommy Watson, and Gloria and Kathleen Petyarre.

== Early life and education ==
Knight was born in Broadford, Victoria, Australia. He was an only child and grew up in a farming community not connected to a power company's grid. His father looked after camels and donkeys and was a breeder of tigers and rhesus monkeys. Throughout his childhood he was regularly taken to the Northern Territory, where his father bought wild camels and donkeys, allowing him to develop close bonds with Aboriginal friends. Early business enterprises included selling products for a local community, Cherbourg in QLD such as emu eggs and didgeridoos. This and his parents' friendship with artists such as Clifford Possum Tjapaltjarri set the foundation for his career as an art dealer.

He attended Assumption College, Kilmore from 1984 to 1990.

== Career ==
Knight's career developed more seriously in the arts when he met Tjapaltjarri in 1992 and became fascinated by the work and stories of the Indigenous Australian art community. At the age of 20 he sold his first painting after touring around the Kimberleys with Judy Daly, who worked with the Aboriginal economic development office in Perth. He met numerous artists within these remote communities who were to find fame, including Queenie McKenzie Nakarra, Jack Britten, Shirley Purdie and Rover Thomas Joolama.

He opened his first art gallery, Knights Indigenous Art Gallery, in 1995.

In 2004 Knight opened Australian Contemporary Aboriginal Art in Abbotsford, Victoria. In 2007 he founded the Aranda Aboriginal Art gallery in Collingwood, a suburb of Melbourne.

Knight's work expanding the reach of Indigenous artists continued and in 2008 he commissioned Gabriella Possum Nungurrayi, daughter of Tjapaltjarri, to create a large-scale installation piece for a display by Jamie Durie at the Chelsea Flower Show in London. This won Durie the gold prize awarded by Queen Elizabeth II, who was presented with an original work by Nungurrayi which now hangs in the royal collection alongside that of her father.

A new Aranda art gallery was opened in Alice Springs in the Northern Territory in 2009, followed by Aranda Art Gallery in Armadale, Victoria in 2012.

In 2017, a show curated by Knight called "Sharing Country" at Olsen Gruin gallery, New York, featuring artists including Sandy Brumby, Tommy Watson, Joseph Jurra Tjapaltjarri, Iluwanti Ken, Puna Yanima, and Tuppy Ngintja Goodwin was listed as one of the top 10 Hottest group shows to see in New York that summer by Artnet.

In 2018 Knight curated "Beyond the Veil" at the same gallery, an exhibition of metaphysical dot paintings created by Aboriginal women, from May to July 2018. Some artists in the show, such as Emily Kame Kngwarreye, were over 70 when their work was created.

In the wake of Damien Hirst being accused of plagiarising Aboriginal artists in his show "The Veil Paintings", which showed at the Gagosian in Beverly Hills earlier that year, the show gained a lot of publicity and was a critical success.

Formerly the vice president of the Aboriginal Art Association of Australia (AAAA) Knight took over as president of the organisation in 2018.

In 2018 the Mitchelton Gallery of Aboriginal Art was opened in Nagambie. Knight created the gallery in partnership with Gerry Ryan, OAM. Following the closure of the Aranda Aboriginal Art gallery in 2011, a result of bargain basement auctions selling indigenous art at knock-down prices Knight was selling work from his home in Tallarook and preparing to set up a small scale gallery there, when Ryan paid him and his collection a visit. Overwhelmed by the work on display he proposed they collaborate on a gallery at the Mitchelton winery complex outside Nagambie in Victoria which was purchased by Ryan in 2011. They began planning a new building but decided to use the cellars under the winery, where the scale (the size of three soccer pitches) and climatic conditions created a perfect exhibition space.

== Philanthropy ==
In 2016 Knight discussed how the goal of the AAAA was to respectfully represent the individuals and organisations involved in the practice of producing, promoting, protecting or supporting indigenous art and allow it to support the culture of their communities. He encourages people to see indigenous art as more than just decoration and strives to show that the market isn't transitory but an establishment dedicated to disseminating meaningful cultural artifacts.

Knight has donated artworks to a number of organisations including The Arts Centre Gold Coast in 2011. In 2012 he was awarded ‘Perpetual Benefactor’ Status at this gallery.

In September 2011, Knight joined a group of other entrepreneurs to run clinics in deprived South African areas and give a young Aboriginal team a chance to play an Exhibition AFL match against a local team at the African Games in Mozambique. Another match was played in the slums of Soweto.

In August 2018 Knight and fellow philanthropist Patrick Corrigan made a donation of five paintings to the Ella Indigenous Learning Centre for exhibition in their Moore Park location.

Knight is also active in promoting ethical and ecologically sound farming practices.

== See also ==
- Australian art
