= Adrian Newstead =

Australian gallerist, art dealer, author and art commentator

Adrian Rodney Newstead OAM, (born 1948) is a Sydney-based gallerist, art dealer, author and art commentator. He is notable for his long-term role in the development of the contemporary Aboriginal art market. His Coo-ee Gallery in Bondi is the oldest dedicated Aboriginal art gallery in Australia, having opened in Paddington in 1981. It was among the earliest galleries to promote Urban Indigenous art and organised the first exhibition of Tiwi art in 1983.

Adrian Newstead served as the head of Aboriginal art for the Lawson-Menzies auction house from 2003 to 2007, facilitating among other sales the purchase of Emily Kame Kngwarreye’s "Earth's Creation" for $1,056,000 in 2007. He was head of auction house Deutscher-Menzies in 2007. His 2014 book The Dealer is the Devil: An Insider’s History of the Aboriginal Art Trade recounts the history of the Aboriginal art movement from an art dealer’s perspective. Newstead was one of the founders of the Australian Indigenous Art Trade Association (Art.Trade). As a commentator he has been vocal on a number of issues including the Resale Royalty Scheme.

In 2016, Newstead received an Order of Australia Medal "for service to the museum and galleries sector, particularly through the promotion of Indigenous arts." The same year he organised the first touring exhibition of Australian Aboriginal art in South America, O Tempo dos Sonhos, along with Indigenous curator Djon Mundine and Brazilian curator Clay D'Paula.
