= Aboriginal Gallery of Dreamings =

Australian art gallery

Coordinates: 37°57′5″S 145°3′56″E

Aboriginal Gallery of Dreamings (AGOD) is an art gallery in Cheltenham, Melbourne, Australia, owned and run by art collector Hank Ebes. It was one of the first galleries in Melbourne to be devoted entirely to Aboriginal art. Starting as a small gallery on Bourke Street, it moved to larger premises in the same street in early 1990, until it outgrew those premises and moved to larger premises in Cheltenham.

== History ==
The Aboriginal Gallery of Dreamings (AGOD) first opened in a small gallery space on Bourke Street, Melbourne. It was established as one of the first Aboriginal art galleries in Melbourne. The collection was originally made up of only a couple of hundred paintings from Aboriginal communities Utopia and Alice Springs, belonging to Aboriginal Art collector and gallery founder, Hank Ebes. The growth of the collection meant that in early 1990 the gallery moved premises to a larger space down the street, from number 37 to number 73-77, where it remained until 2008.

Over 12,500 paintings from more than 500 artists were commissioned by AGOD directly from the artists, communities, and various trusted agents living in Alice Springs and remote desert locations. By 2001 AGOD required additional space, so purchased a 2,500-square-metre (27,000 sq ft) warehouse located 30 minutes southeast of the city centre, in Cheltenham.

In 2008, the city location closed, and AGOD moved to the larger and now refurbished premises in Cheltenham.

By May 2019, over the 30 years of its existence, AGOD had commissioned more than 10,000 paintings directly from artists in Utopia, Northern Territory.

== The Emily Museum ==
In 2009, more than 200 works by renowned Aboriginal artist Emily Kame Kngwarreye were set aside from the collection at AGOD to form the core for a Melbourne-located museum. When the gallery owners failed to receive government funding, the Emily Museum was instead opened in early 2013 alongside AGOD, at the gallery space in Cheltenham. The exhibition showcased the 5x15m "Emily Wall", as well as works from Kngwarreye's Last Series. It was the first museum featuring a single Aboriginal artist.

However it closed after three years.

== Artists ==
Artists represented at AGOD include:

- Pansy Napangardi
- Gloria Petyarre
- Four Pwerle sisters, including Minnie Pwerle and Angelina Pwerle
- Clifford Possum Tjapaltjarri
- Timmy Payungka Tjapangati
- Billy Stockman Tjapaltjarri
- Barbara Weir
