= Gabriella Possum Nungurrayi =

Indigenous Australian contemporary artist

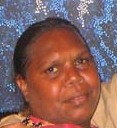
- Born: 1967 (age 58–59); Papunya, Northern Territory, Australia
- Known for: Painting
- Movement: contemporary Indigenous Australian art

Gabriella Possum Nungurrayi (born in 1967) is a contemporary Indigenous Australian artist born in the Papunya community, she followed in her father Clifford Possum Tjapaltjarri's footsteps and became an internationally respected painter. Examples of her work are held in many gallery collections in Australia and elsewhere, including the National Gallery of Australia, the Flinders University Art Museum, the Kelton Foundation Collection, the Museum & Art Gallery of the Northern Territory and the Royal Collection.

== Early life ==
Gabriella Possum Nungurrayi is the eldest daughter of Indigenous Australian artist Clifford Possum Tjapaltjarri. Born in 1967 in Papunya, around 2.4 km northwest of Alice Springs in the community formed in the 1930s when Pintupi and Luritja people were forced off their traditional land and moved into Hermannsburg and Haasts Bluff. Her language is Anmatyerre. She spent her early life in Alice Springs, where she began painting with her father from a very young age.

== Career ==
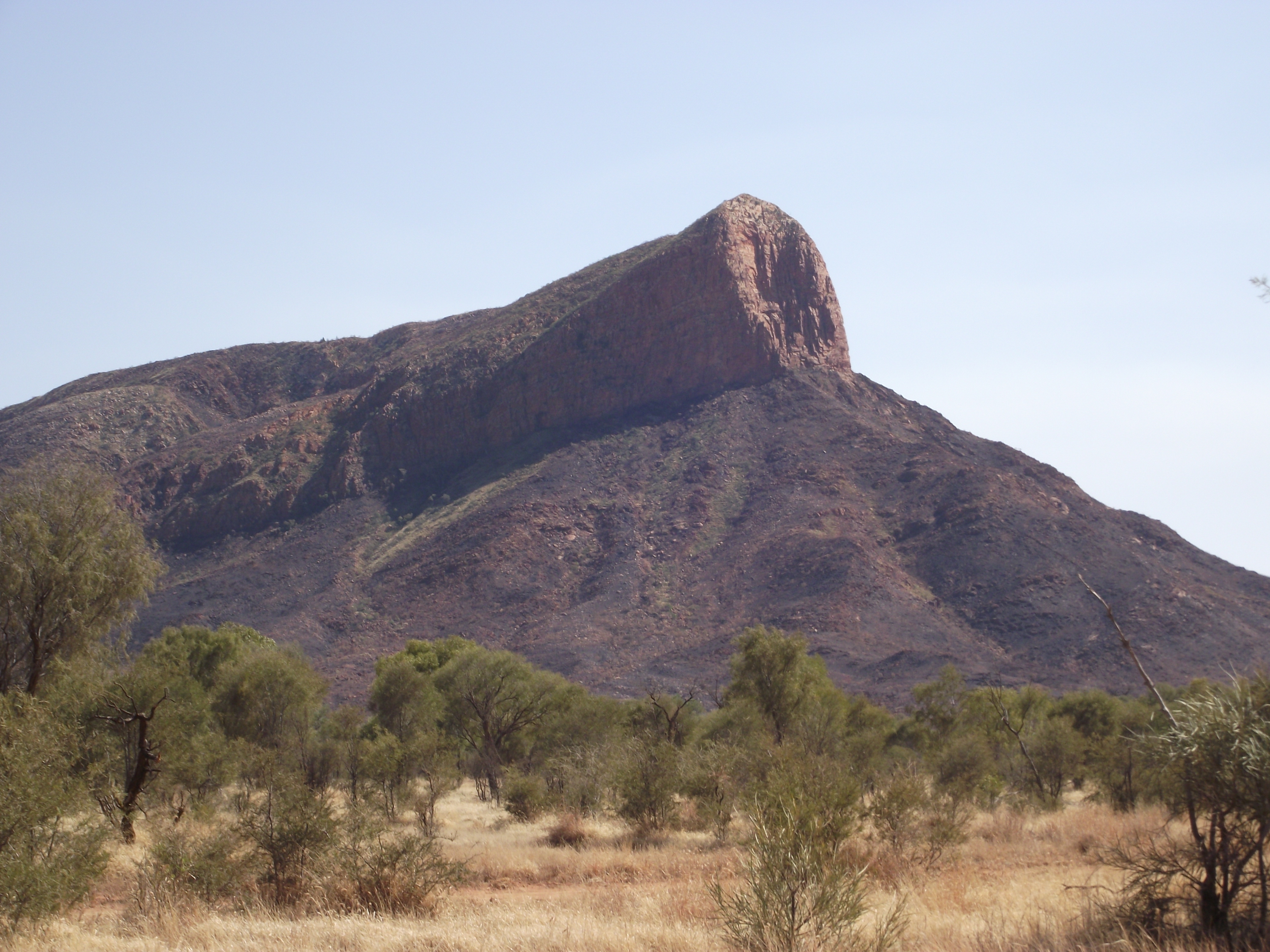
Haasts Bluff, visible between Glen Helen Resort to Papunya. Near to where Gabriella Possum Nungurrayi was born.

When she was 16 In 1985, Nungurrayi won the Alice Springs Art Award.

Throughout her life Nungurrayi has been exhibiting work in Australia and overseas. In 1991 Nungurrayi received a Professional Development Grant from the Aboriginal Arts Unit of the Australia Council for the Arts, which helped her to develop her recognisable style showing dotted landscapes featuring elements such as bush foods familiar to her people. As her work was shown at higher profile galleries, collectors became interested in her work.

As indigenous art from Australia gained more recognition, Nungurrayi's talent was recognised in a number of international shows. In 2006, she was one of the 33 artists showing at the National Museum of Women in the Arts, which was the first major US presentation of art by indigenous women in Australia. In 2010 Nungurrayi showed work in the Down Under Gallery in Munich, Germany.

In 2008 Nungurrayi's work found an international audience when celebrity gardener Jamie Durie won the Gold Medal in the Chelsea Flower Show. When HRH Queen Elizabeth gave Durie the prize she was presented with an original work by the artist, which now hangs in the royal collection alongside that of her father.

At the 2014 Melbourne festival her work was used to decorate a tram as part of a major public art project called Melbourne Art Trams.

At Vivid Sydney 2016, Nungurrayi's work was selected by director of the "Lighting of the Sails" installation, meaning her images were projected onto the Sydney Opera House along with five other Indigenous artists, Karla Dickens, Djon Mundine, Reko Rennie, Donny Woolagoodja, and Gulumbu Yunupingu.

Her sister, Michelle Possum Nungurrayi is also a renowned artist. They exhibited together in 2017 at the Japingka gallery in Perth in 2017.

== Personal life ==
Since the early 2000s, Nungurrayi has lived near to Melbourne with her family. The sale of her father's piece "Warlugulong" earned her significant resale royalty, which was seen as a fitting change made possible by the Australian resale royalty right movement, which sought to prevent financial exploitation of indigenous artists. https://books.google.com/books?id=ZVpjDQAAQBAJ&q=Gabriella+Possum+Nungurrayi&pg=PT238
