= Menzies Art Brands =

Australian auction house

Menzies Art Brands is an Australian art auction company which includes both the Deutscher-Menzies and Lawson-Menzies auction houses. It is part of the private company Menzies International, which also includes cleaning business Menzies Group and the vineyard Noorilim Estate. It is one of Australia's major art auction houses by takings.

== History ==
The company began as Deutscher-Menzies in 1997, founded by entrepreneur Rod Menzies and art dealer Chris Deutscher. Menzies bought Deutscher’s Melbourne based art dealership, and in doing so also acquired a stable of artists including Peter Booth, Bill Henson, John Olsen and John Brack. The first auction was conducted in 1998. In September 2001, Rod Menzies purchased Lawsons, a well known Sydney based auction house, and founded Lawson-Menzies. While Lawson-Menzies initially specialised in collectibles, it soon entered the same high value art market as Deutscher-Menzies. Both competed directly with Sotheby’s and Christie’s, until Christie’s departed Australia in 2005. In 2004, Menzies Art Brands was officially formed from the combining of Deutscher-Menzies and Lawson-Menzies.

In 2004, Lawson-Menzies established a specialist Aboriginal art department to capitalise on the booming Aboriginal art market. Sydney Aboriginal art dealer Adrian Newstead was recruited to run the department. He notably sold Emily Kame Kngwarreye's painting Earth's Creation for $1,056,000 in May 2007. At the time, this was the world record price for Aboriginal art, and is still the highest price paid for a work by an Australian female artist. In the same boom year of 2007, Menzies sold Brett Whiteley's The Olgas for Ernest Giles for $3.48 million (including commissions). This was at the time the record for an Australian artwork sold at auction. The record is currently held by another work sold through Menzies, Sidney Nolan's First-Class Marksman, which sold to the Art Gallery of New South Wales for $5.4 million in March 2010.

In 2006, Menzies’ business partner Chris Deutscher left to form a new auction company, Deutscher and Hackett, with Menzies’ painting specialist Damian Hackett.

== Controversy ==
In 2008, Menzies Art Brands was the subject of an Australian Competition & Consumer Commission (ACCC) inquiry into Rod Menzies' undisclosed interest in his own art sales. Rival auction houses accused Menzies of buying works through Menzies Art Brands auctions that he himself owned or co-owned, thus distorting the market by inflating sales figures, and subsequently giving the impression that the works were fresh to the market when they were resold. This practice is not illegal however, and the ACCC concluded after a lengthy probe that no further action needed to be taken. Following the inquiry, Menzies added a disclaimer to his catalogues that works "may be owned wholly or in part by Menzies Art Brands or the principal of Menzies Art Brands". In 2019 Menzies disclosed explicitly for the first time that 10 lots in an upcoming auction were from his own collection, and had previously been purchased at his own auctions.
