= Billy Wara =

Australian Aboriginal sculptor

- Born: c. 1920; Aṟan, Northern Territory
- Died: November 2008 (aged 87–88)
- Occupation: Sculptor
- Years active: 1980s–present
- Organization(s): Maṟuku Arts and Crafts
- Style: Western Desert art

Billy Wara (c.1920 – November 2008) was an Australian Aboriginal craftsman who made wooden sculptures. He is best known for his sculptures of goannas, made from wood that is native to the central Australian desert. His sculptures were carved by hand and decorated by burning patterns into the wood. He also crafted traditional hunting tools, such as spears and spear-throwers.

== Life ==
Wara was born at Aṟan, in the south-west of the Northern Territory. He and his family were Pitjantjatjara. They lived a traditional nomadic way of life in the bush until Wara was a young man. The first "whitefella" he ever saw was Harold Lasseter, a gold prospector whose story later became an Australian legend. Wara was about 12 years old at the time, and thought Lasseter was a ghost. A portrait of him giving figs to Lasseter features in Winifred Hilliard's book The People in Between (1968).

When he was a young man, Wara and his family settled at Ernabella, a Presbyterian mission at the time. He worked building fences, digging wells, and as a shepherd and sheep shearer. Later, he served as an advisor for the Uluṟu-Kata Tjuṯa National Park on environmental and cultural issues. He began carving wooden sculptures shortly after Maṟuku Arts and Crafts opened in 1984. He originally made his sculptures at Muṯitjulu, in the national park. He later set up an outstation at Umutju, further south, so that he could work closer to his traditional lands.

== Artwork ==
Although he crafted other things, Wara was best known for his wooden sculptures (puṉu in Pitjantjatjara). He carved them by hand and burned designs into them with a hot wire stick (this is called pyrography). His sculptures are of the perentie lizard, a type of goanna from central Australia which is also Wara's totem.

His depictions of the perentie are taken from his Tjukurpa, a set of beliefs about his spiritual ancestor, the Wati Ngiṉṯaka and their activities which shaped the land and its people during the Dreamtime. The Wati Ngiṉṯaka Tjukurpa forms his family's sacred law, and the law associated with Wara's place of birth, Aṟan. Most of the knowledge of Tjukurpa is restricted to its senior custodians. Wara tells that Wati Ngiṉṯaka fled from the east with a stolen grindstone hidden in his tail. The men chasing after him caught up with him at Aṟan and searched his stomach for the stone, but could not find it.

Wara's work has been shown in several exhibitions, both in Australia and other countries. His sculptures are held in the Powerhouse Museum, the Museum of Victoria, the National Gallery of Australia, and the National Museum of Australia. It is also part of the National Museum of Ethnology in Japan, and the Kelton Foundation in the United States.
