= Warlugulong =

1977 painting by Clifford Possum Tjapaltjarri

- Artist: Clifford Possum Tjapaltjarri
- Year: 1977
- Medium: Acrylic paint on canvas
- Dimensions: 202.0 cm × 337.5 cm (79.5 in × 132.9 in)
- Location: National Gallery of Australia, Canberra
- Owner: National Gallery of Australia

Warlugulong is a 1977 acrylic on canvas painting by Indigenous Australian artist Clifford Possum Tjapaltjarri. (Note: Tjapaltjarri (in Western Desert dialects) is a skin name, one of sixteen used to denote the subsections or subgroups in the kinship system of central Australian Indigenous people. These names define kinship relationships that influence preferred marriage partners and may be associated with particular totems. Although they may be used as terms of address, they are not surnames in the sense used by Europeans. Thus Clifford Possum is the element of the artist's name that is specifically his.) Owned for many years by the Commonwealth Bank, the work was sold by art dealer Hank Ebes on 24 July 2007, setting a record price for a contemporary Indigenous Australian art work bought at auction when it was purchased by the National Gallery of Australia for A$2.4 million. The painting illustrates the story of an ancestral being called Lungkata, together with eight other dreamings associated with localities about which Clifford Possum had traditional knowledge. It exemplifies a distinctive painting style developed by Papunya Tula artists in the 1970s, and blends representation of landscape with ceremonial iconography. Art critic Benjamin Genocchio describes it as "a work of real national significance [and] one of the most important 20th-century Australian paintings".

== Background ==
Contemporary Indigenous Australian art originated with the Indigenous men of Papunya, located around 240 kilometres (150 mi) northwest of Alice Springs in Australia's Western Desert, who began painting in 1971. The youngest was Clifford Possum Tjapaltjarri, encouraged by his older brother Tim Leura Tjapaltjarri. A number of the men developed a distinctive style of narrative painting that, beginning around 1976, resulted in the production of several "monumental" works that included representations of both their traditional lands and of ceremonial iconography. Clifford Possum was the first to make this transition commencing with a related painting, also titled Warlugulong (1976), now held by the Art Gallery of New South Wales. The two images are amongst five that the artist created between 1976 and 1979 that linked the iconography of sacred stories to geographic representation of his country – the land to which he belonged and about which he had traditional knowledge. The artist's images of this period are visually complex, and contain a wide variety of patterns, unified by strong background motifs and structure.

== The painting ==
Created in synthetic polymer paint on canvas, and a substantial 2 by 3.3 metres (6.6 ft × 10.8 ft) in size, the work's title is taken from a location roughly 300 kilometres (190 mi) "northwest of Alice Springs associated with a powerful desert dreaming". Clifford Possum would often collaborate with other artists, particularly his brother Tim Leura, and the brothers together created the 1976 work of the same name. (Note: A separate, smaller work with the similar title Dreaming Story at Warlugulong (Warlukurlangu) (1976), held by the National Museum of Australia, was painted by Clifford Possum alone.) Art critic Benjamin Genocchio has referred to the 1977 work as also being by the brothers; however, the National Gallery of Australia credits it solely to Clifford Possum. Like the other four works of the period that are symbolic maps of the artist's country, the painting is accompanied by annotated diagrams of the images and notes that explain the dreamings that they include.

Detail showing the skeleton of one of Lungkata's sons, against a background representing smoke and ashes

While the painting has been described as showing the story of an ancestral being called Lungkata starting the first bushfire, it portrays elements of nine distinct dreamings, of which Lungkata's tale is the central motif. Lungkata was the Bluetongue Lizard Man, an ancestral figure responsible for creating bushfire. The painting portrays the results of a fire, caused by Lungkata to punish his two sons who did not share with their father the kangaroo they had caught. The sons' skeletons are on the right hand side of the image, shown against a background representing smoke and ashes.

Around this central motif are arranged elements of eight other stories, all of them represented at least in part by sets of footprints. Human footprints include a set left by dancing women from a place called Aileron; another shows a family group travelling to a place called Ngama, and a third trail is that of a Tjungurrayi man, which lead to his skeleton, representing his death after committing the crime of trying to steal sacred items. Animal representations include tracks of a cluster of emus from a place called Napperby, on the artist's country, as well as those left by the rock wallaby, or Mala, men journeying north from Port Augusta in South Australia, as well as, on the left hand edge of the picture, those of two groups of dingoes going to a place called Warrabri. A little closer to the centre of the painting are marks representing a dreaming called the Chase of the Goanna Men. Throughout the work, Upambura the Possum Man's footsteps follow the wandering lines that give the painting its overall structure.

This work excludes elements of several dreamings associated with country further south, which had been included in the painting created by Clifford Possum and his brother a year earlier. The omission led scholar Vivien Johnson to conclude that Warlugulong (1977) portrays a narrower geographic area than the preceding work. The artist also modified some of the iconography, and limited the explanations of the painting, omitting secret-sacred dimensions of the stories to avoid offending other Indigenous men, and in recognition that most of the audience for the work would be uninitiated non-Indigenous people.

Johnson's analysis of the painting emphasises the relationship between the representation of geographical sites in the Yuendumu region and the dreaming stories associated with those sites. She concludes that there is "a topographic rationale for the order in which the Dreamings appear from left to right (that is, east to west) across the painting [as well as for] the transverse Dreaming trails". However, beyond this general principle, she argues that the layout of symbols and images is influenced by the desire to present a symmetrical work. There is greater visual symmetry in this painting than in its 1976 predecessor; symmetry is a strong influence in the works of many of the early Western Desert artists, including Clifford Possum, Billy Stockman Tjapaltjarri and Kaapa Tjampitjinpa.

Warlugulong (1977) is acclaimed as a landmark Indigenous painting; a great work by one of the country's foremost artists. Described as "epic" and "sprawling", Genocchio said of it that is "a work of real national significance [and] one of the most important 20th-century Australian paintings". The authors of the National Gallery of Australia's book, Collection Highlights, characterises the painting as the artist's most significant. Artist and curator Brenda L Croft agreed, considering it "an epic painting, encyclopaedic in both content and ambition" and "the artist's most significant work". The work and the price it achieved at auction in 2007 are cited as evidence of both the importance of Clifford Possum as an artist, and of the maturation and growth of the Australian Indigenous art market.

== Sale history ==
Warlugulong was first exhibited at a show in Alice Springs, where it attracted crowds of interested viewers, but failed to sell. Realities Gallery in Melbourne then included the work in a major exhibition of Papunya Tula artworks. It was purchased for A$1,200 by the Commonwealth Bank, which hung it in a bank training centre cafeteria on the Mornington Peninsula. The bank sold it by auction in 1996. The auction house trading the work expected it to fetch around $5,000 and did not make a feature of it in the catalogue, but dealers including Hank Ebes, the successful bidder, recognised the painting's significance and it sold for $36,000 plus commission. After hanging in Ebes's living room for eleven years, it was auctioned in Melbourne by Sotheby's on 24 July 2007. It sold for $2.4 million, thoroughly eclipsing the previous record for an Indigenous Australian painting, set when Emily Kngwarreye's Earth's Creation was bought in May of the same year for just over $1 million. Warlugulong's buyer was the National Gallery of Australia, which purchased the work as part of its 25th Anniversary Gifts Program. The Gallery considers the painting to be possibly the most important in its collection of Indigenous Australian art. As of 2016, the work is on display in the National Gallery.

When the Australian government in 2009 introduced a resale royalty scheme, the sale history of Warlugulong was frequently used to argue in favour of the scheme, designed to ensure that artists and their families continued to benefit from the appreciating value of old works.
