= Rod Menzies =

Australian entrepreneur (born 1945)

Rodney William "Rod" Menzies (31 August 1945 - 25 April 2022) born in Melbourne) was an Australian entrepreneur. In 1969 he founded Menzies International, a private company, which is one of Australia's 500 most profitable private companies. Menzies International includes the cleaning business Menzies Group, the art auction house Menzies Art Brands (which includes both Deutscher-Menzies and Lawson-Menzies), the vineyard Noorilim Estate, and Menzies International Racing Stables.

Menzies attended Caulfield Grammar School, and studied at the University of Melbourne (B.Com 1968) and Pepperdine University in Los Angeles (MBA 1988). He opened Menzies Cleaning Services in 1969, and operated this business in America from 1984 to 1993. After opening an art auction house in 1998, the takings of Menzies Art Brands ran second to Sotheby's Australian arm only twice, by 2010.

== See also ==
- List of Caulfield Grammar School people
