= Christopher Hodges =

Australian artist

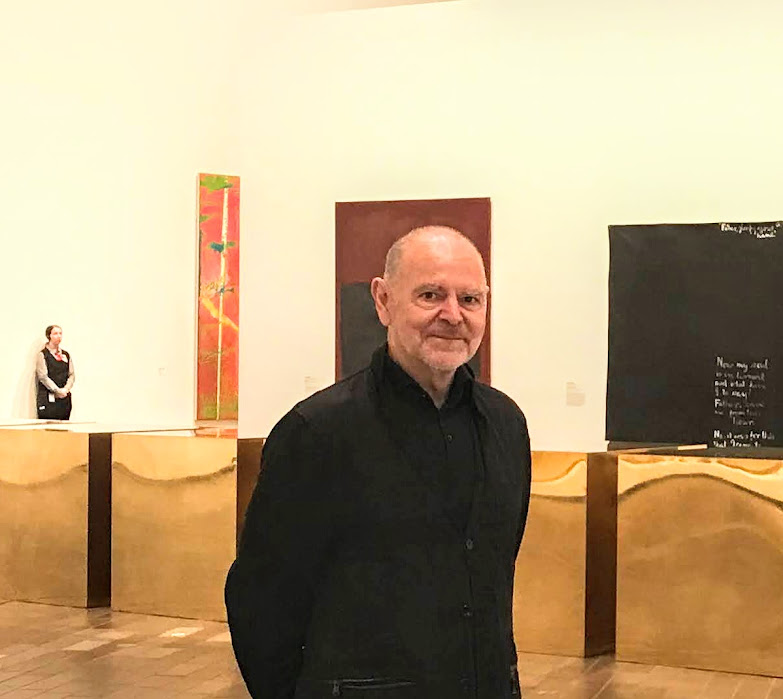
Christopher Hodges at the National Gallery of Australia February 2024

Christopher Hodges is a contemporary Australian artist. He is the Director and Founder of Utopia Art Sydney. Utopia Art Sydney was established in early 1988 with a program presenting contemporary Indigenous and non-Indigenous artists equally.

== Education ==
Hodges was born in 1954 on Gadigal Land and lived in Kensington throughout his school years. He attended Kensington Public School, Woollahra Demonstration School and Sydney Boys High School. Hodges studied art at the Alexander Mackie CAE between 1973-1976, graduating with a Dip Art (Ed). He then taught art from Kindergarten to Primary, Secondary, Graduate and Post Graduate Level students

== Artistic career ==
Hodges first solo exhibition was at Coventry Gallery, Sydney, in 1979, and he has held over 34 solo exhibitions since then. He now exhibits at Utopia Art Sydney.

Over his career, Hodges has worked in painting, drawing, printing, and sculpture. Much of his work, across mediums, has been interested in organic geometry: "I have done a lot of works that use geometry, but at the same time I have done a lot of works with what looks like repeated forms when, in fact, every curve is different. So I guess a kind of organic geometry is actually what I am aiming at, sort of like nature."

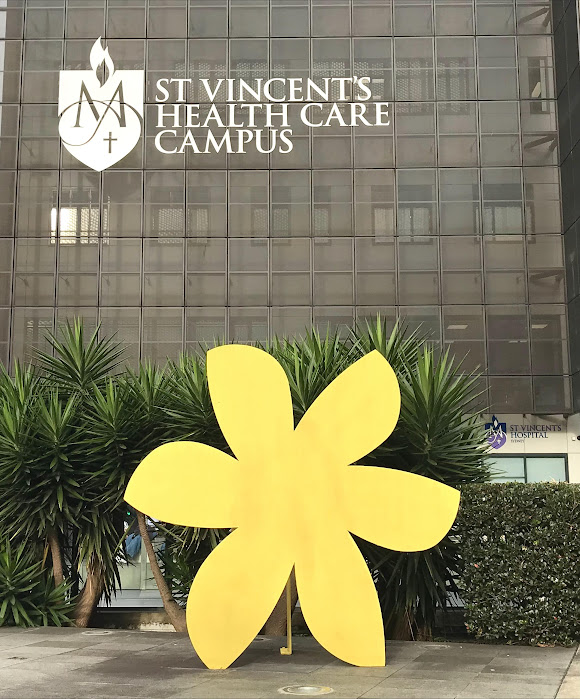
Flower for a Friend 2010. St Vincents Hospital Sydney

Major public sculpture commissions include 'Flower for a Friend' (2010) at St Vincent's Hospital, Sydney, and 'The White Flower' (2009) commissioned by the Mosman Municipal Council for Hunter Park, Balmoral.

The most recent of Hodges career 34 solo exhibitions was New Horizons at Utopia Art Sydney in July 2024. He has been included in 209 group shows. Coffs Harbour Regional Gallery held a survey exhibition in 2008 and NERAM held a survey exhibition in 2020. His work has been exhibited in public galleries including Newcastle, Armidale (NERAM), Maitland, Wagga Wagga, Orange, and Tamworth.

== Painting ==
Hodges has been primarily known for abstraction. His painting explores the use of the line either in stripes, bands of color or circular movement. However, in Hodges two most recent exhibitions, 2023 and 2024, he developed ideas that read as landscape; "in this show, overwhelmingly, his paintings look like landscapes. These new paintings create a sense you are seeing something you might know, but also something you may have not seen or known before."

== Sculpture ==
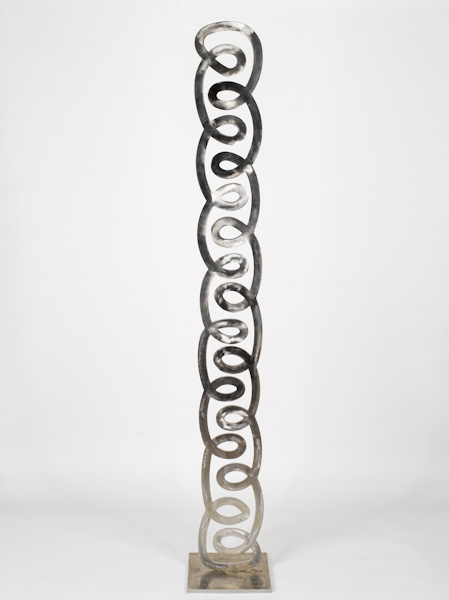

Hodges sculpture signature is minimal and spare appearance, "Subtlety of form is balanced by intense surface attention" Hodges first show had only one sculpture in it. The National Gallery of Australia acquired Hodges sculptures from mainly painting shows. For some years Hodges focused exclusively on sculpture. Sculptures have often been derived directly from his paintings. HIs painted brushstroke lines informed steel and stainless steel sculpture. Hodges then moved to animate the surfaces. There is a constant artistic interchange between paintings and sculpture.

== Museum Acquisitions ==
Hodges work has been acquired by over 36 major public collections including the National Gallery of Australia, Art Gallery of NSW, Queensland Art Gallery and National Gallery of Victoria; Regional Galleries throughout Australia and important private collections.

== Gallery career ==
Hodges is the Director of Utopia Art Sydney, which he founded in 1988. Utopia Art Sydney is committed to the representation of Australian and international artists, including leading indigenous artists such as Emily Kame Kngwarreye and members of Papunya Tula Artists such as Ronnie Tjampitjinpa and Makinti Napanangka. It played a key role in introducing Aboriginal artists to the wider Australian art community.

Over the years, Hodges has written extensively on indigenous Australian art and has consulted for exhibitions such as 'Emily Kame Kngwarreye: Alhalkere: Paintings from Utopia'. Hodges wrote a "deeply moving" 5000 word tribute essay on Emily Kngwarreye titled 'Representing Emily' for Artist Profile in May 2024 and represented Kngwarreye for her whole career.

== Public roles ==
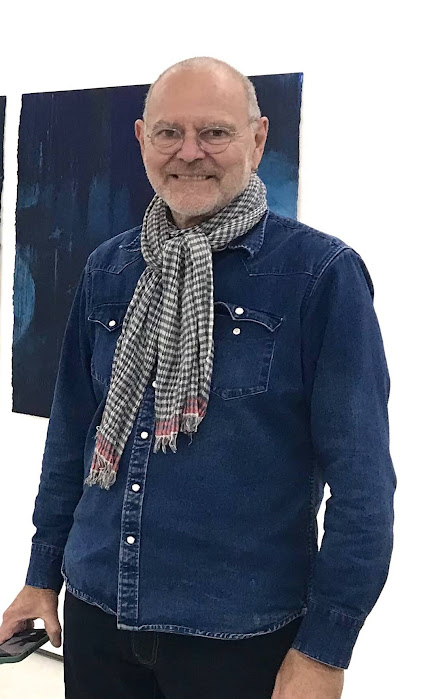
Hodges in Utopia Art Sydney during a 2024 exhibition.

Hodges is a member of the Australian Commercial Galleries Association which advocates for the ethical representation of artists. His public contributions are aimed at creating lasting impact on the Australian art scene, particularly in the elevation of contemporary Indigenous art. Hodges was Chair of the Melbourne Art Fair from 2008 through 2016. He helped establish the Melbourne Art Fair Foundation to identify and celebrate Australia’s artists and art professionals. He was a member of the Directors Council at the MCA in the 2000s and is a member of the Art Committee for the S H Ervin Gallery.
