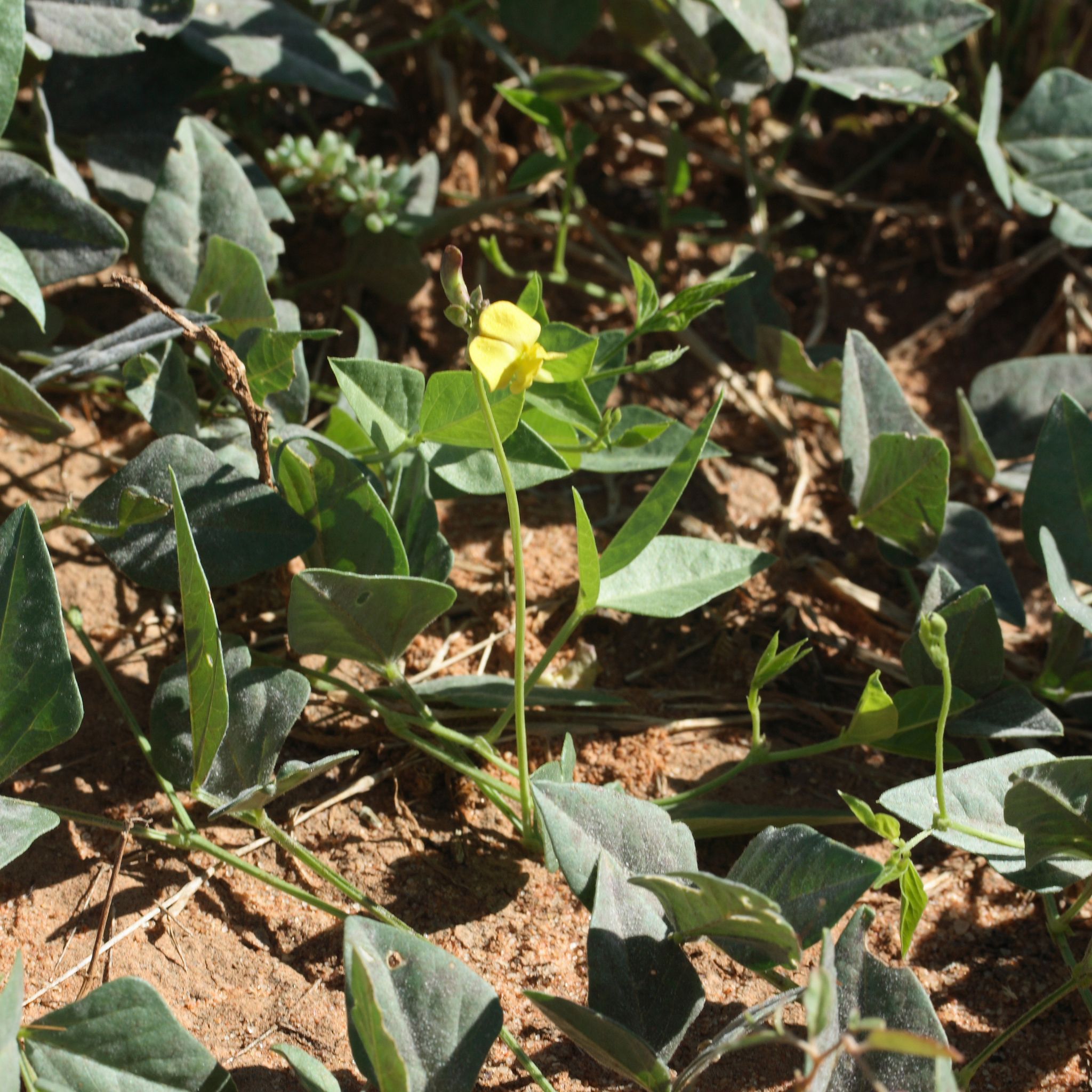

Scientific classification
- Kingdom: Plantae
- Clade: Tracheophytes
- Clade: Angiosperms
- Clade: Eudicots
- Clade: Rosids
- Order: Fabales
- Family: Fabaceae
- Subfamily: Faboideae
- Genus: Vigna
- Species: V. lanceolata

Binomial name
- Vigna lanceolata Benth.

= Vigna lanceolata =

Species of plant

Vigna lanceolata, known as the pencil yam, native bean, Maloga bean, parsnip bean, Ngarlajiyi, small yam, yam, bush carrot, Wapurtali, Wapirti, and Wajaraki is an Australian native plant. Its name in the Arrernte language of Central Australia is Merne arlatyeye.

Bush carrot is an important bush tucker food for Australian Aboriginal people, and there are many Dreaming rituals around it. It is still commonly eaten in the desert today. It is a slender twining plant with yellow pea flowers throughout the year.

Aboriginal people from the desert dig them up in creekbeds. They look for the white roots, then cook them in the hot earth beside the fire until they are just firm.

Esteemed artist Emily Kngwarreye had an individual Dreaming around the pencil yam. This meant she had been given stories about the origins of the pencil yam, and was entitled to tell these stories and paint the yam.
