= Ian Potter Museum of Art =

Coordinates: 37°47′51.0″S 144°57′50.8″E

Potter Museum of Art
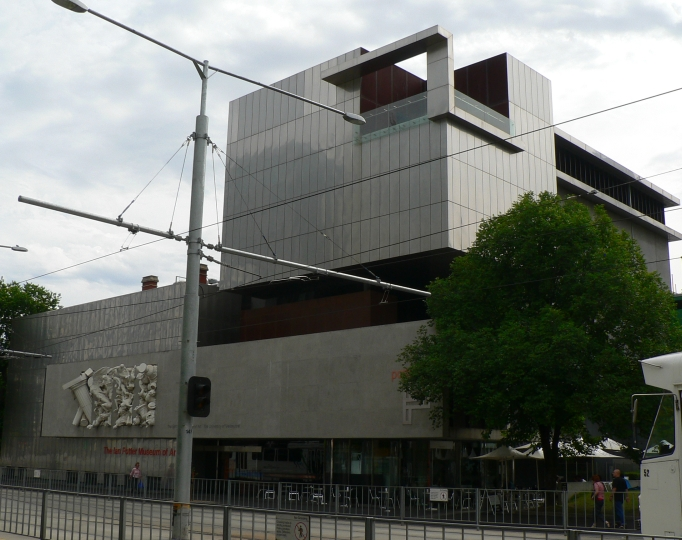
- Established: 1972
- Location: The University of Melbourne, Corner Swanston Street and Masson Road, Parkville, Victoria 3010
- Type: Art museum
- Website: potter-museum.unimelb.edu.au

The Potter Museum of Art at the University of Melbourne in Melbourne, Australia was established to accommodate various art and historical collections of the University. In 1972 as the University Gallery, was renamed the University of Melbourne Museum of Art in 1988, then when it was rehoused in a new building, became the Ian Potter Museum of Art. After a reconstruction it reopened in 2025. It runs an exhibition program of historical and contemporary art

== History ==
=== University Gallery ===
The University Gallery was established in 1972 in the Medley Building at the Grattan Street entrance of the University on the fourth floor of the East Tower.

From its early years it housed university portraits of the period 1880-1977 and material from archives and the Grainger Museum, in a collection sourced from commissions, purchases, gifts and bequests of Dr Joseph Brown, Russell Grimwade, Norman Macgeorge, and Harold Clive Disher, and the Norman Lindsay Collection, and Leonard Adam Ethnographical Collections. The first catalogue of permanent holdings was published in 1971. University collections of art that were shown periodically were of Classical Antiquities and Middle Eastern material.

In 1975, the University Gallery moved from the John Medley Building to the Old Physics Building, situated south of the Union Building on Grattan Street following extensive renovation to provide three exhibition galleries, offices, and storage, which was funded in part by external donors and gifts, and designed by architect Daryl Jackson. It was opened in April 1975 by Sir John Rothenstein CBE. Staff in 1975 were curator, Betty Clarke and assistant curator, Maudie Palmer AO. Maureen Gilchrist in The Age while also announcing the recent opening of the gallery at Monash University, and the imminent opening of an extension to the Ewing Gallery, predicted that Melbourne University's would "become one of the best exhibition galleries in Melbourne."

=== University of Melbourne Museum of Art ===
Over 1988, additional gallery space was created in the former Physics Annexe on Swanston Street. At this point the institution became known as the University of Melbourne Museum of Art, with the Swanston Street site housing the Ian Potter Gallery and Art Conservation Centre. Meanwhile the Old Physics galleries continued regular operation.

=== The Ian Potter Museum of Art ===
The University of Melbourne's art collection was officially renamed The Ian Potter Museum of Art in July 1998 when the current building opened in 1998, designed by the architect Nonda Katsalidis of Katsalidis Architects. The architect project team included Bill Krotiris, Adrian Amore, Lisette Agius, Donna Brzezinski, Keiran Boyle, Kei Lu Cheong, Luisa Di Gregorio, Holger Frese, Chris Godsell, Robert Kolak, Barbara Moje, Rainer Strunz, Marius Vogl, Jackie Wagner.

The Potter, as it is known locally, presents a curated exhibition program of historical and contemporary art. Through its activities the Potter provides for the acquisition, maintenance, conservation, cataloguing, exhibition, investigation, interpretation and promotion of the extensive art collections of the University of Melbourne.

In 1999, the museum was awarded the Victorian Architecture Medal for project of the year by the Australian Institute of Architects and the Melbourne Prize for architecture, for the contribution of the project to the public life of the city.

=== Hiatus 2018–2025 ===
The museum closed in 2018 for renovations,

=== 2025 reopening renamed Potter Museum of Art ===
The Potter reopened in 2025 with the 65,000 Years: A Short History of Australian Art exhibition.

== Staff and associates ==
Maudie Palmer AO was among several notable arts administrators, including Naomi Cass, who commenced a professional career at the University Gallery. Palmer worked from 1975 to 1981 as assistant director/curator. Part of her remit was its Grainger collection. During this period, she promoted living artists, and developed curatorial approaches that combined scholarly rigour with public engagement.

Others associated with the Museum are Charlotte Day, Rose Hiscock, Judith Ryan AM, Shanysa McConville, Samantha Comte, Hannah Presley, Alisa Bunbury, Isabella Hone-Saunders, Rebecca Hall, Dr Kyla McFarlane among others.

== Selected exhibitions ==
- 1974, June: Graphic Art in Germany Today
- 1974, July: Caucasian Rugs
- 1974, September: The Classical Coin
- 1975, 17 April–22 May: University Collection
- 1976, June–2 July: William Delafield-Cook survey exhibition
