= Seven Sisters songline =

Sisters in Aboriginal Australian mythology

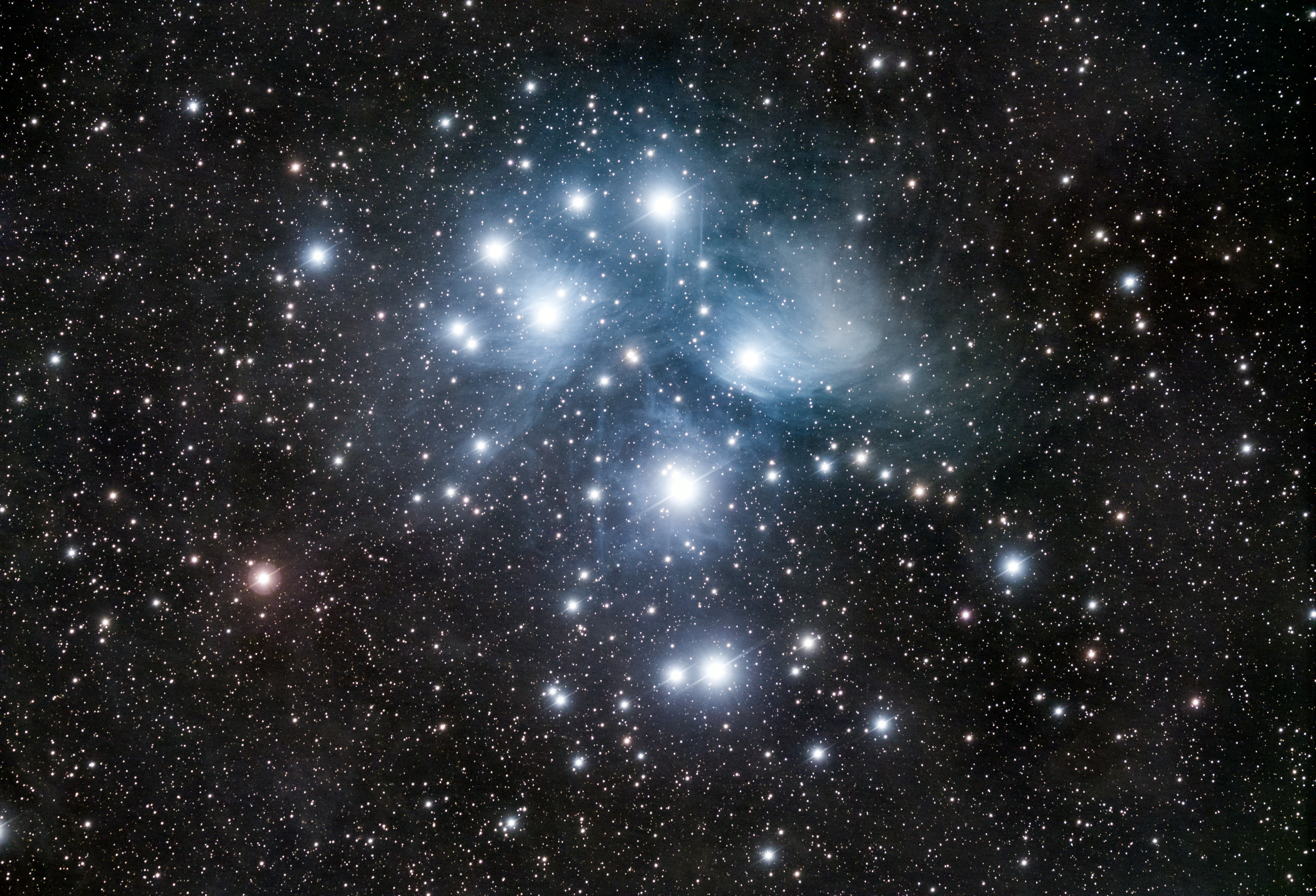
In many Aboriginal Australian Dreamings, the Pleiades star cluster is associated with the story of the Seven Sisters.

The Seven Sisters are figures in the Dreaming of Aboriginal Australians across Australia. Their names and the details of their activities vary by country and language.

In central and western desert accounts, the sisters are pursued by a lustful sorcerer. His pursuit is sexually violent, involving at times laying ambush, spying, and in some versions capturing one or more sisters. His obsession prevents an approach in accordance with cultural norms, and produces an unstable landscape that "seethes and ripples with sexual desire". The themes are similar to the story of Pleiades in Greek mythology, which also describes the pursuit of seven sisters and is also associated with the Pleiades star cluster.

In the cultures of Indigenous Australians, the Dreaming is understood as an "active, continuous presence in the land", happening at all times, which is reconstituted as the keepers of stories perform ceremonies, create art, and travel the country.

== Overview ==
Across Australia, Seven Sisters songlines are present in "virtually all" Aboriginal Australian language groups. Between these groups, the names of the sisters and the details of their activities vary by country and language, but a connection between and the star cluster Pleiades and constellation Orion appear to be universal.

== Western Desert cultural bloc ==
=== Martu lands ===
In Martu country, the Seven Sisters are known as Minyipuru, and their pursuer Yurla. The pursuit is divided into two songlines: the Pangkal songline, wherein the sisters travel 100 kilometres in the area north of Telfer and Punmu, and the Parnngurr songline, 600 kilometres along the Canning Stock Route between Parnngurr and Pangkapini.

Fleeing, they fly from Roebourne, a coastal area in north-western Western Australia. Despite starting with many sisters, their numbers diminish as they travel, reduced by the taxing process of creating landforms along their journey. The landscape they navigate is unpredictable, rendered unstable by Yurla's sexual obsession. These landforms are characterized by the Martu people as their "footprints". Yurla follows these footprints; a senior Martu lawman, relaying the songline due to the frailty of a senior lawwoman in the community, describes Yurla as "always in their sight."

600 kilometres east of Roebourne, they camp and perform ceremonies at Pangkal, a rockhole near the mining town of Telfer. Exhausted, some sisters transform into rocks, replaced by others who spring from the earth. They taunt Yurla by flying above him while exposing their genitals, producing a violent reaction in which Yurla's penis, independent from him, breaks through the rock hole "as if penetrating the earth itself." The events at Pangkal are the subject of several paintings.

Travelling south, the sisters pause near Parnngurr. Yurla's penis, coiled and holding connotations of a snake, lays in wait nearby. At Kalypa, a watering hole on the Canning Stock Route, women encounter men for the first time; these men are distinct from Yurla, who is more like a "force of nature in the guise of a man". Unlike their interactions with Yurla, they are able to knock these men unconscious in a fight. Writer Kim Mahood identifies their protestations as "what may be the earliest known statement of female autonomy." At Pankapini, the edge of Martu country, Yurla captures a sister. Through trickery, she is rescued, and the sisters fly above Yurla, taunting him. He builds a ladder which they knock over, leaving him crawling and desperate. Here, he is described in tellings as "poor fella".

The songline is understood as primarily owned by senior women, and its protection as their responsibility. Many of the details are guarded as private cultural knowledge. Some elements are shared, such as the encounter at Pankapini, where ceremonies are performed by men and women together. Yurla represents forbidden desire, and faces humiliation as a result, and the songline contains elements of both morality and psychology. It is a central songline in Martu Dreaming, and has been depicted in numerous artworks. Therein, the Sisters are not always the main focus—their depiction is sometimes incidental, signifying their basic presence in daily life.

=== Aṉangu Pitjantjatjara Yankunytjatjara lands ===
[The Aṉangu Kungkarangkalpa story is] an enticing, cheeky and provocative narrative about sex, sexual opportunity, voyeurism and sexual avoidance which comes alive and takes on a different guise every time it is sung, danced and painted, sensed in country or witnessed in the night skies.

— Judith Ryan, The National Gallery of Victoria's Indigenous Art Curator, in 2010

In Aṉangu Pitjantjatjara Yankunytjatjara (APY) land, a region in central Australia occupied by the Pitjantjatjara and Yankunytjatjara people (members of the broader Aṉangu grouping), the Seven Sisters are known as Kungkarangkalpa, and their pursuer Wati Nyiru. In accounts, the Kungkarangkalpa flee south from Irawa Bore, a site near Watarrka (Kings Canyon), to Alkara.

As elsewhere, much of the Dreaming of Aṉangu people is restricted from those outside the community, as well as to those inside not considered mature or old enough. The account revealed to those outside is ambiguous, described by researcher Diana Young as "pliable and shape-shifting". A version of the Kungkarangkalpa songline performed in 2013 by elders from the deserts of Western Australia, South Australia, and the Northern Territory proceeded as follows.

Travelling south from the Northern Territory, the Seven Sisters encounter a writhing multicoloured snake-like object with uneasy curiosity. Quickly, the older sister kicks it away, revealing it as the long penis of Wati Nyiru, which he had sent for them in lust. Wati Nyiru continues to pursue them, using an ability to shapeshift to tempt the women as a shady tree and bush food, although he fails to trick the older sister. At times, his lust becomes a multi-coloured rainbow across the sky, from where he spies. The women interacted with him, at times cheekily, and other times fearful. Several times he uses magic to make them tired.

In his pursuit, a dejected Wati Nyiru asks himself why the women do not want to see him. He inspects his footprint, finding seven toe imprints, and infers he is flawed. He checks again and again, each time finding a different number of toe imprints, and sadly concludes he is evil. He continues pursuing the sisters. At the cave Walinynga (Cave Hill), Wati Nyiru catches up to them, and they barely escape as his penis, in excited lust, breaks through a wall. Frustrated, Wati Nyiru sings magic, causing the older sister to bleed and fall sick. He catches and rapes her, leaving her bleeding to death. The sisters lift her into the sky and follow her, becoming the star cluster Pleiades. Wati Nyiru continues his chase, becoming the constellation Orion.

Since the 1980s, the Seven Sisters have been a popular subject for Aṉangu painters, who use it to stand in for broader life, including tracks, waterholes and bush foods. New mediums such as batik and ceramics have also been used in transferring knowledge of the Seven Sisters, alongside the traditional method of performance. At Walinynga, figures depicted in cave art are understood by Pitjantjatjara and Yankunytjatjara people to illustrate the Seven Sisters songline. Among evidence, dots which fill the figure's bodies are read as allusions to the stars of Pleiades, although archaeologist June Ross says it is ultimately unknowable whether this was the original artists' intentions.

=== Ngaanyatjarra lands ===
Two songlines exist for the Seven Sisters in Ngaanyatjarra country, a region west of APY country. In the Kura Ala songline, the sisters flee west from Wati Nyiru, retaining the name Kungkarangkalpa. In the Wanarn songline, fleeing north-east from Kunnamurra at the edge of Martu country, the name for the sisters changes from Minyipuru to Kungkarrangkalpa, while Yurla retains his name.

Margo Neale describes these songlines as having a darker tone, and the actions of Wati Nyiru as being "more sinister". In the Kura Ala songline, the sisters are travelling west from Pirilyilunguru. At Kura Ala, a rock formation with an appearance strongly evocative of staring eyes under a defined brow, they are found by Wati Nyiru. Here, Wati Nyiru's obsessive fixation on the elder sister leaves her captured and hurt. Left weak, her sisters support her and gather food and medicinal plants, but in doing so catch the attention of Wati Nyiru. He sends his penis after them in the form of a carpet snake, but the sisters catch it and throw it east. As they begin travelling again, they chance upon the penis at Minyma Ngampi and mistake it for snake meat. After eating it, they fall ill and "[can't] walk anymore", upon which they take flight into the sky to become stars.

In the Wanarn songline, the sisters in flight enter Ngaanyatjarra lands from the west. Travelling through Kunnamurra, they take rest at the rock formation Tjitjipirnitjunku. Wati Nyiru finds them, and pokes holes in the rocks in an attempt to nab them, leaving features still visible today. A cycle ensues, where the sisters flee to a new place, and are found and scared by Wati Nyiru, leaving a trail of geographic features, where had crouched, or scared them with his penis. Ultimately the sisters arrive at Wangkarirr. Seeing a wasp dig into the ground, they know there is water beneath the surface, and dig a waterhole. Outside, Wati Nyiru watches their progress. When their heads are beneath the ground, he covers the hole, leaving them trapped. He marries them all, which is why the water at Wangkarirr has many water snakes.

Anthropologist Bryony Nicholson gives an account of the Seven Sisters songline being performed in Kuru Ala, deep in the Great Victoria Desert. Eileen Tjayanka Woods, who Nicholson identifies as a "senior knowledge holder for this story", assumes the role of Kampukurta, the older sister. She dances to a song sung by the elder women. She collapses, still dancing, then sings out to her younger sister, asking for support, having been left weakened after encountering Wati Nyiru. She is joined by a dancer in the role of her younger sister, and they dance together before collapsing. In response, the singers whisper Ngarltutjarra!—poor thing—to Nicholson "an expression of sorrow and affection from a captivated audience".

== Elsewhere ==
In the Canberra region, the Seven Sisters story concerns an "ice maiden".

== Sharing public elements ==
Efforts by elders to share public elements have taken place for decades in the hopes of creating a way to transfer knowledge between generations and to share culture outside of country. This has seen push-back from some parts of communities, but coordinators say there is strong majority support.

A livestreamed performance of the Seven Sisters storyline in 2013 was undertaken by APY artists in Canberra as part of the Alive with the Dreaming! Songlines of the Western Desert project. Artists danced in front of a fire to the singing of senior women, performing the story described above. Digital and lighting effects were used to augment the performance. With increased attention to the songline in the leadup, an uptick of art related to the Seven Sisters was produced.

An exhibition, Songlines: Tracking the seven sisters, followed in 2017–2018. Songlines was initiated in 2010 by elders of Aṉangu groups, who wanted to convey stories, and strengthen the songlines. The exhibition was organised by Aṉangu in partnership with the National Museum of Australia, with a key role played by curator Margo Neale. The resulting exhibition combined paintings, photographs and multimedia in an effort to depict the progression of storylines across the landscape. Writer on Indigenous Australian art Vivien Johnson described the effort as a task that had "never before been done in such meticulous detail over such immense distances."

== Comparisons with international Seven Sisters traditions ==
Stories of Seven Sisters, linked to Pleiades and the Orion constellation, exist in cultures across both the Northern and Southern hemispheres in locations as distant as Ireland and Japan.

The close resemblance of Aboriginal Australian accounts of the Seven Sisters to the Pleiades in Greek mythology and other Seven Sisters stories have received academic attention. The traditional view among anthropologists held that the story was introduced to Australia via Europeans, although this is no longer believed. Aboriginal Astronomy scholars Ray Norris and Duane Hamacher speculate this may reflect two cultures coming to similar stories independently, or it may implicate an earlier story they both drew from.

== See also ==
- Australian Aboriginal astronomy
- Karatgurk

== Bibliography ==
- Neale, Margo, ed. (2017). Songlines: Tracking the Seven Sisters. National Museum of Australia Press. ISBN 9781921953293.
  - Girgirba, Kumpaya; Taylor, Nola Ngalangka (2017). "Follow their footprints". In Neale, Margo (ed.). Songlines: Tracking the Seven Sisters. National Museum of Australia Press. ISBN 9781921953293.
  - James, Diana; Williamson, Inawinytji (2017). "So everyone can see: Kungkarangkalpa inma in Canberra". In Neale, Margo (ed.). Songlines: Tracking the Seven Sisters. National Museum of Australia Press. ISBN 9781921953293.
  - Laidlaw, Betty; Porter, Julie (Laidlaw) (2017). "Tjukurrpa Kungkarrangkalpa - Kulyuru and Kuru Ala". In Neale, Margo (ed.). Songlines: Tracking the Seven Sisters. National Museum of Australia Press. ISBN 9781921953293.
  - Mahood, Kim (2017a). "The seething landscape". In Neale, Margo (ed.). Songlines: Tracking the Seven Sisters. National Museum of Australia Press. ISBN 9781921953293.
  - Mahood, Kim (2017b). "This country is us". In Neale, Margo (ed.). Songlines: Tracking the Seven Sisters. National Museum of Australia Press. ISBN 9781921953293.
  - Newberry, Bernard (2017). "He chased them all the way to this country". In Neale, Margo (ed.). Songlines: Tracking the Seven Sisters. National Museum of Australia Press. ISBN 9781921953293.
  - Nicholson, Bryony (2017). "Yours is a straight line... ours is a circle". In Neale, Margo (ed.). Songlines: Tracking the Seven Sisters. National Museum of Australia Press. ISBN 9781921953293.
  - Ross, June (2017). "Kungkarangkalpa and the art of Walinynga". In Neale, Margo (ed.). Songlines: Tracking the Seven Sisters. National Museum of Australia Press. ISBN 9781921953293.
  - Taylor, Muuki (2017). "I play the role of that man Yurla". In Neale, Margo (ed.). Songlines: Tracking the Seven Sisters. National Museum of Australia Press. ISBN 9781921953293.
  - Young, Diana (2017). "On revealing and concealing". In Neale, Margo (ed.). Songlines: Tracking the Seven Sisters. National Museum of Australia Press. ISBN 9781921953293.
