= Kelton Foundation =

Private Charitable Organization

The Kelton Foundation, also known as the Richard Kelton Foundation, in Santa Monica, California, was founded in 1983 as a private charitable organization by real estate developer Richard Kelton, who died in 2019. Its main activities comprise "ethnographic, scientific and artistic investigations of humankind and the sea", and it holds a vast collection of artworks, known as the Kelton Foundation Collection, or Kelton Collection.

Kelton was particularly interested in maritime art of the Pacific region, China Trade art, ethnographic materials, and Aboriginal Australian art, and travelled and collected works until around 2007. He mounted his first exhibition in 1980 at the Pacific Asia Museum in Pasadena, believed to be the first Aboriginal Australian art exhibition in the United States. The foundation mounts exhibitions, lends its objects and art to other institutions, and provides assistance to scholars undertaking related research.

The Kelton Collection has held works by contemporary Indigenous Australian artists including Takariya Napaltjarri, Daisy Leura Nakamarra, Minnie Pwerle and Dhuwarrwarr Marika. Kelton had a particularly close affinity with Emily Kame Kngwarreye and Clifford Possum Tjapaltjarri, but many many other artists are represented, from Arnhem Land, the Tiwi Islands, the eastern Kimberley region of Western Australia, and elsewhere.

The foundation also funds the Blue World Web Museum, a "virtual museum" focused on maritime art, whose goal is to mount exhibitions on subjects otherwise unavailable online; to educate; and to stimulate public interest in maritime museums.

In December 2020, Kelton's estate sold more than 250 works to Swiss collector Bruno Raschle for around US$10m. The Foundation continues its philanthropic connection to Australia, focusing on First Nations health and education projects.

== Bibliography ==
- Johnson, Vivien (2008). Lives of the Papunya Tula Artists. Alice Springs: IAD Press. ISBN 978-1-86465-090-7.
- McCulloch, Alan; Susan McCulloch; Emily McCulloch Childs (2006). The new McCulloch's Encyclopedia of Australian Art. Fitzroy, Victoria: Aus Art Editions in association with The Miegunyah Press. ISBN 0-522-85317-X.
