= Mickey of Ulladulla =

(1820–1891) Aboriginal artist

- Born: 1820 south coast of New South Wales
- Died: 1891 (aged 70–71)
- Known for: Artistic works

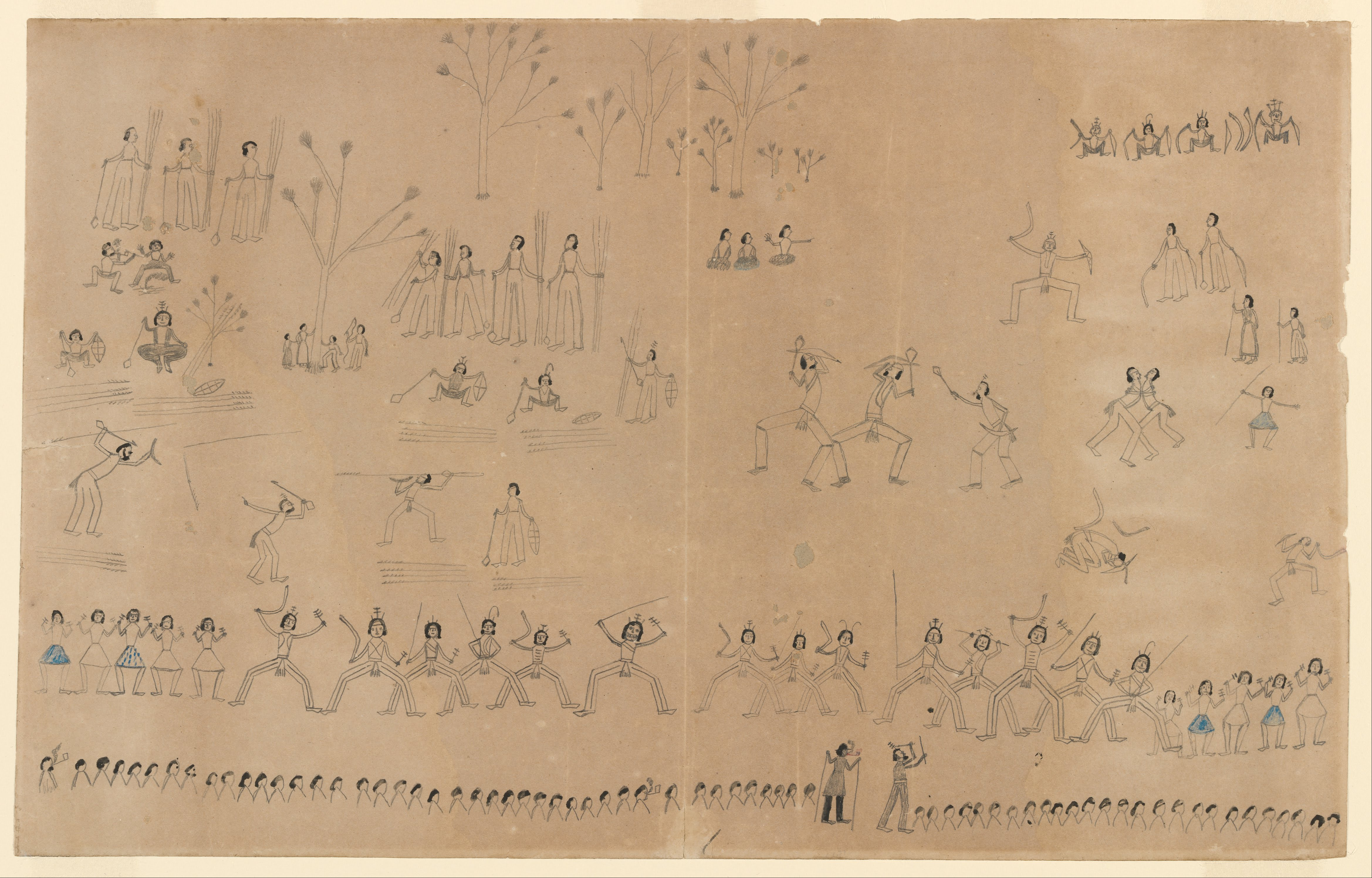
An example of Micky of Ulladulla's work, depicting the Dhurga people.

Mickey of Ulladulla (1820–1891), also known as "Micky the Cripple", was an Aboriginal Australian artist most famous for drawings of Australian scenes and culture.

Typically his drawings were made in the style of line drawings and wash. Most of his artworks were created with pencils, crayons, and watercolours, and typically depicted scenes of animals, fish, plants, and Australian aboriginal people. Some academics have argued that his artworks could constitute as an attempt to document the ongoing colonialism of Ulladulla.

After his death, some of his artworks were displayed at the 1893 World's Columbian Exposition. According to the Australian Dictionary of Biography, the earliest known mention of his existence is located in the Mitchell Library, Sydney.

Currently his drawings can be found in the Australian Institute of Aboriginal and Torres Strait Islander Studies, the State Library of New South Wales, the National Gallery of Australia, and the National Library of Australia.
