= Port Jackson Painter =

Unidentified Australian artist

The Port Jackson Painter was one or more unknown watercolour artists working in Sydney, Australia, from 1788 through to the 1790s. The paintings are of plants, animals and life in Sydney. Many believe that they were the naval officers of the time who had both the time and the training to paint the new environment around them.

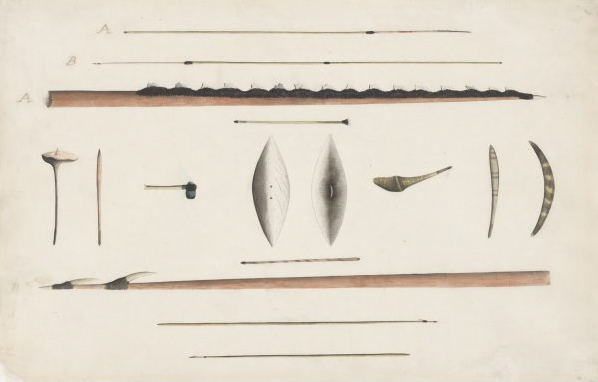
Title: Aboriginal Hunting Implements and Weapons. Previously attributed to John Hunter

== See also ==
- Thomas Watling
