= Sandy Brumby =

Australian painter

- Born: c.1950 Pukatja, South Australia
- Known for: Painting
- Movement: Contemporary Indigenous Australian art

Sandy Brumby (born around 1950) is an Aboriginal Australian artist whose work rapidly became popular following the start of his career late in life.

== Early life ==
Brumby grew up at an outstation called Victory Downs near to Pukatja (then known as Ernabella) with his mother, father, brother and sister. Early jobs included working at a cattle station called Mount Cavanagh near Kulgera over the threshold of the Northern Territory, where he mustered bullocks, fixed fences and looked after the cows.

== Career ==
The first time he picked up a paintbrush was in the Ninuku Arts centre, an Aboriginal art and craft centre established in 2008. He produced work almost every day from then, saying he was spontaneously documenting the life of his people.

In a short period of time his paintings gained significant attention and were acquired by notable public collections, including the National Gallery of Victoria, the Art Gallery of South Australia and Queensland Art Gallery. His work became collectable quickly.

Sharing Country, the show Brumby was involved in at Olsen Gruin, New York, in 2017 was rated among the top ten of the hottest summer group shows to see that year by Artnet.

=== Style ===
Brumby's work references symbols frequently used in rock and cave paintings around Uluru and Kata Tjuta. His paintings have a lively, raw character, displaying a powerful communication with his culture and his people. His love of colour makes use of a wide range of hues, but he uses delicate brush strokes in his work.

== Personal life ==
Sandy met his wife in Pukatja and for some time they settled in the Amata community. Eventually they moved on to Pipalyatjara, before the Kalka and Pipalyatjara communities were fully established. Here they had two children and brought them up in this area. In 2015 Sandy moved to a retirement home.

== Major collections ==
- National Gallery of Australia, Canberra, ACT
- National Gallery of Victoria, Melbourne, VIC
- Queensland Art Gallery

== Selected other exhibitions ==
- Sharing Country, Olsen Gruin, New York, United States, 15 June — 10 August 2017
- Nganampa Kililpil: Our Stars, Hazelhurst Regional Gallery & Arts Centre, Sydney, 15 October - 11 December 2016
- Red Dot Gallery, Singapore, 16 September - 17 October 2015
- Salon Des Refuses, Paul Johnstone Gallery, Stokes Hill Wharf, Darwin, Australia, 9–24 August 2014
- Alcaston Gallery, Fitzroy, Victoria, Australia, 18 February - 14 March 2014

== See also ==
- Australian art
- Indigenous Australian art
