= Artlink =

Australian journal

- Cover of vol. 28, no. 2, June 2008
- Editor: Una Rey
- Former editors: Eve Sullivan
- Categories: Contemporary art
- Frequency: Quarterly
- Founder: Stephanie Britton
- Founded: 1981; 45 years ago
- Country: Australia
- Language: English
- Website: www.artlink.com.au
- ISSN: 0727-1239

Artlink, formerly titled Artlink: Australian contemporary art quarterly, is a themed magazine covering contemporary art and ideas from Australia and the Asia-Pacific. It covers a diverse range of issues, including social and environmental issues as well as media arts, science and technology.

== History ==
Artlink was established in Adelaide in 1981 by Stephanie Britton as a bi-monthly newsletter, published in black and white by Art Link Incorporated. Its initial funding came from the South Australian Department for the Arts, and the magazine was run by a committee on which the following bodies were represented: the Experimental Art Foundation, the Contemporary Art Society, the South Australian School of Art Student Union, the Women's Art Movement, and the Friends of the Art Gallery of South Australia.

From 1986, the magazine developed national coverage, with regional editors, and from 1988 began quarterly publication, with themed issues beginning in 1989. In 1994, Artlink Australia was created to replace Art Link Inc.

From 1988 until 2020, Artlink was published quarterly, with themed issues being introduced in 1989. Since 2021, Artlink has published three print issues each year.

Since June 2011, Artlink has published regular editions of Artlink Indigenous, beginning with three-year project to produce annual issues. The first issue was guest edited by Daniel Browning and Stephanie Radok, and was also launched in London, with the assistance of the Australian High Commission. commissioned by Aboriginal and Torres Strait Islander writers, editors and artists.

In 2014, Stephanie Britton retired from the position of executive editor, and Eve Sullivan was appointed to the position in July 2014. Sullivan left in February 2021, and Una Rey succeeded her as editor in 2022. Belinda Howden joined her as assistant editor in March 2023 and worked in that capacity until October 2025. Eleen Deprez joined as assistant editor in January 2026.

== Description ==
Artlink is listed on the Australian Research Council's Excellence in Research for Australia (ERA) 2018 journal list, meaning that it meets the criteria of being academic or scholarly, and publishes original peer-reviewed research.

The National Library of Australia's catalogue entry gives Artlink: Australian contemporary art quarterly as an alternative title.

== Publication and funding ==
Published by Artlink Australia, based in the Adelaide suburb of Glenside, Artlink receives support from the Australian Government via the Australia Council for the Arts and other funds, the South Australian Department of the Premier and Cabinet, and private sponsors.

== Governance and staff ==
As of December 2025, Una Rey is editor of Artlink. There is a board of directors comprising five members, chaired by Marika Lucas-Edwards.

== Distribution ==
As of 2021 Artlink is distributed by Ovato Retail Distribution Australia to newsagents in Australia and New Zealand, and by Artlink Australia to independent bookshops, galleries and museums.

Issues are also available as PDFs via the website, and the full text version is available via APAIS until December 2013.
