= Carlene West =

Australian Indigenous artist from Pitjantjatjara

- Born: circa 1945 (age 80–81); Tjitjiti

Carlene West (born c. 1945) is a Pitjantjatjara Indigenous artist from Australia's southern desert region. Her paintings are included in the collection of the Art Gallery of New South Wales, the National Gallery of Victoria, the National Gallery of Australia, and the British Museum. Her work has been exhibited across Australia as well as internationally.

== Life ==
Carlene West was born in Spinifex country at Tjitjiti which names a vast salt lake and is a sacred place for which she holds custodial responsibility.

In 1959, West and her parents were forced off their land by British nuclear testing at Maralinga. The family moved to the mission of Cundeelee where West met her husband Fred Grant, who is also a notable Indigenous artist. The couple became central in the movement for Spinifex people's return to country. As part of The Spinifex Art Project (est. 1997), West's work was used as evidence in their Native Title claim as document of the Spinifex's connection to the land. In 2009 West and Grant were able to return to Tjitjiti.

West continues to be a practising artist and currently resides in Tjuntjunjtara, Western Australia.

== Work ==
West began painting in 1997, working with acrylic paint on large sheets of canvas. Throughout her career West has focused on depicting her birthplace of Tjitjiti. Her early work was done in the style typical of the Western Desert region, reminiscent of the artists of Papunya Tula.

In 2012 West's work changed radically as result of her encounter with Alzheimers. She began depicting Tjitjiti in a gestural fashion, using black, red, and cream to paint voids on the canvas traced with trails of fine dotting. This style is characteristic of her recent work.

== Selected exhibitions ==
- 2016–2019 Marking the Infinite – United States: New Orleans LA, Miami FL, Scottsdale AZ, Reno NV, Washington DC, Canada: Vancouver BC

== Represented in public collections ==
- National Gallery of Victoria
- Art Gallery of New South Wales
- National Gallery of Australia
- The British Museum
