= Margo Neale =

First Nations Australian curator

Margo Ngawa Neale is an Australian author, historian, and curator, who is of Aboriginal and Irish descent, and a Gumbaynggirr and Wiradjuri woman. Her Aboriginal name is Ngawa Gurrawa, meaning "talkative but knowledgeable".

Neale is based in Canberra and is an adjunct professor at the Australian National University. She is the senior Indigenous curator and principal advisor to the director of the National Museum of Australia. She has also served as the head of the Gallery of Aboriginal Australia at the museum.

As a curator Neale has pioneered major exhibitions, including the international solo exhibition of the works of Emily Kame Kngwarreye in 2008, as well as the Songlines: Tracking the Seven Sisters exhibition.

She is an internationally recognised expert on songlines, and says that they are "the history of Australia, written by Aboriginal people recorded millennia before white man arrived".

== Select publications ==
Neale has been the editor of many publications including:

- 2020, Songlines: the power and the promise.
- 2017, Songlines: tracking the Seven Sisters.
- 2008, Utopia: the Genius of Emily Kame Kngwarreye.
- 2000, The Oxford Companion to Aboriginal Art and Culture.
