= Johnny Warangkula Tjupurrula =

- Born: 1925; Napperby Station, Northern Territory, Australia
- Died: 12 February 2001 (aged 75–76); Papunya, Northern Territory, Australia
- Other names: Johnny Warangula Tjupurrula, Johnny Warrangula Tjupurrula, Johnny Warankula Tjupurrula, Johnny Warrangula Tjaparula, Johnny W. Tjupurrula, W. Johnny
- Known for: Painting, contemporary Indigenous Australian art

Johnny Warangkula Tjupurrula (1925 – 12 February 2001) was an Australian painter whose work has been widely collected and well-regarded since the late 60s. Many of his pieces are said to stand out from that of other Australian Aboriginal artists in the way they present the transitory beauty of water and its transformative effect on the landscape represented in works. His paintings are held in galleries and collections in Australia and elsewhere, including the National Gallery of Australia, the National Museum of Australia, the Art Gallery of Western Australia and the National Gallery of Victoria.

== Life ==
Warangkula was one of the Pintupi people and a speaker of a dialect of the Western Desert language. He was young when his family migrated following the devastating drought of the 1920s, settling with his extended family near Haasts Bluff in the early 1930s. The site was chosen for its proximity to a ration station established by Lutheran missionaries. The Haasts Bluff Pintupi lived interculturally with Anmatyerr, Kukatja, Luritja, Warlpiri and Western Arrernte people. Following the realisation that a disastrous drought could threaten Haasts Bluff, the swelling population was found a new settlement at Papunya, where water had been struck in 1954.

Early in his life, his passion for his people gained him roles as a law man, storyteller and painter. He was also a rainmaker. His main ancestral site, 400 kilometres west of Alice Springs was Kalipinypa, a well in sandhill country. Warangkula cites Winpa the Lightning Boss who sang up a storm from Kalipinypa, propelling it eastward and creating a series of waterholes, marking the path of the artist's songline. His talent derives from this ancestor who sang and stamped out songs from his creation of that storm, which Warangkula learned as a young man.

The famous Honey Ant murals being painted on a school at Papunya in 1971 is considered the founding moment of the contemporary Western Desert art movement. Warangkula was involved in this painting, which opened a door to another arena for the other seven men who took part, namely Yuendumu Men's Museum, which opened in July 1971. In 1974 these murals were painted over at the order of a local bureaucrat.

After he began finding success while painting in the 1980's, his health deteriorated. Tjupurrula lost three fingers from his right hand and lost his left arm due to an untreated fracture. His vision started to deteriorate later in his life, but he continued to paint regardless of his health issues.

In 1972 he sold a painting to Tim Guthrie for less than $150. At a well known 1997 Sotheby's auction the same piece, "Water Dreaming at Kalipinypa" from the Tim Guthrie Collection of Early Western Desert Paintings sold for $206,000 to a Californian buyer for the record sum of $206,000 against an estimate of $50,000–$80,000. Warangkula was featured in the press as a dishevelled starving artist. Before the auction night, the National Indigenous Arts Advocacy Association had communicated with both Sothebys's and the Guthrie estate, highlighting the artist's circumstances and appealing for a donation from the proceeds, which was subsequently rejected. This issue of poor remuneration was exacerbated by the controversy of the Anglo-Australian writer, Elizabeth Durack, who painted under the name Eddie Burrup. Her works were submitted to the Aboriginal Art awards, which drew significant attention to the troubling respect to real aboriginal artists such as Tjupurrula.

The auction triggered a new wave of work from Warangkula. In June 2000 "Water Dreaming at Kalipinypa" was resold at auction to a private collector for an even higher price than before. Warangkula was again represented in the media as an unfortunate martyr of the greedy art market but was in fact enjoying his twilight years.

== Painting style ==
Warangkula's early paintings at Papunya, developed the plastic qualities of acrylic painting, establishing a correspondence between rhythmic dotted patterns suggesting links between ceremonial decoration and depictions of vegetation in the desert. After establishing this relationship between dots and plant life it has become a recognisable metaphor used by many desert art practitioners.

== Legacy ==
The 1997 auction coincided with his diminishing vision but Warangkula continued to work creating hundreds of paintings with a coarse expressionistic aesthetic. Many of these went to art dealers keen to have desert art in their collections. These late paintings are frequently disdained by the market as they are considered crude and unworthy of his earlier works. However, work from his golden age and a number of successful late pieces are featured in galleries throughout the world. Throughout his thirty-year painting career he was an idiosyncratic figure, renowned for wearing a stockman's hat and charming all who he met with ambiguous sincerity. Seemingly oblivious to the financial and material aspects of life, immersion in his Dreamings triggered by his best paintings give the viewer a taste of ancient knowledge, captivating western audiences with a rare comfort about their role as commodities. Johnny Warangkula Tjupurrula died at his home in Alice Springs on 12 February 2001.

== Personal life ==
In the last ten years of his life Warangkula lived with his second wife Gladys Napanangka at Papunya. He had two sons and six daughters from this marriage and two daughters from a previous one.

== Major collections ==
- National Gallery of Australia, Canberra, ACT
- National Museum of Australia, Canberra, ACT
- Art Gallery of South Australia, Adelaide, SA
- Art Gallery of Western Australia, Perth, WA
- National Gallery of Victoria, Melbourne, VIC
- Queensland Art Gallery
- Holmes à Court Collection, Perth, WA
- Kluge-Ruhe Aboriginal Art Collection of the University of Virginia, VA, USA
- Museums and Art Galleries of the Northern Territory, Darwin, NT
- Art Gallery of South Australia
- Flinders University Art Museum, Adelaide, SA
- Alice Springs Law Courts, NT
- Orange Regional Gallery, Orange, NSW

== See also ==
- Art of Australia
