= Clifford Possum Tjapaltjarri =

Australian Aboriginal artist (1932–2002)

- Born: 1932; Napperby Station, Northern Territory, Australia
- Died: 21 June 2002 (aged 69–70); Alice Springs, Northern Territory, Australia
- Other names: Clifford Possum, Clifford Possum Tjapaltjari
- Known for: Painting, contemporary Indigenous Australian art

Clifford Possum Tjapaltjarri AO (1932 – 21 June 2002) was an Australian painter, considered to be one of the most collected and renowned Australian Aboriginal artists. His paintings are held in galleries and collections in Australia and elsewhere, including the Art Gallery of New South Wales, the National Gallery of Australia, the Kelton Foundation and the Royal Collection.

== Life and painting ==
Possum's father was Tjatjiti Tjungurrayai and his mother was Long Rose Nangala. After his father's death in the 1940s his mother married Gwoya Jungarai, better known as One Pound Jimmy, whose image was used on a well known Australian postage stamp. His brother was Tim Leura Tjapaltjarri, whose artwork appeared on another stamp. His older brother Cassidy Possum Tjapaltjarri was a traditionalist who barely gone outside of the Yuelamu community and was one of the most respected elders till his passing in 2006, Clifford Possum Tjapaltjarri was the most famous of the contemporary artists who lived around Papunya, in the Northern Territory's Western Desert area, when the acrylic painting style (known popularly as "dot art") was initiated. Geoffrey Bardon came to Papunya in the early 1970s and encouraged the Aboriginal people to put their dreaming stories on canvas, stories which had previously been depicted ephemerally on the ground. Clifford Possum emerged as one of the leaders in this school of painting, which has come to be called the Western Desert Art Movement. His first international exhibition was held in London at the Rebecca Hossack Gallery in 1990 and titled 'Clifford Possum and the Papunya Tula Artists. Possum was of the Anmatyerre culture-linguistic group from around Alherramp (Laramba) community. He was of the Peltharr skin.

When it held an exhibition of his work in 2004, the Art Gallery of New South Wales described his artistic background:

He was an expert wood-carver and took up painting long before the emergence of the Papunya Tula School in the early 1970s. When Clifford Possum Tjapaltjarri joined this group of 'dot and circle' painters early in 1972 he immediately distinguished himself as one of its most talented members and went on to create some of the largest and most complex paintings ever produced.

Clifford Possum Tjapaltjarri led a ground-breaking career and was amongst the vanguard of Indigenous Australian artists to be recognised by the international art world. Like Albert Namatjira before him, Clifford Possum blazed a trail for future generations of Indigenous artists; bridging the gap between Aboriginal art and contemporary Australian art.

== Death and legacy ==
Clifford Possum Tjapaltjarri died in Alice Springs on the day he was scheduled to be invested with the Order of Australia for his contributions to art and to the Indigenous community. His obituaries, which appeared in newspapers around the world, generally referred to him as Clifford Possum and gave his age as about 70. While his year of birth is considered to be approximately correct, the day and month remain undocumented. His two daughters, Gabriella Possum Nungurayyi and Michelle Possum Nungurayyi, are renowned artists in their own right. There was legal controversy surrounding his burial, as his surviving family and community maintained he wished to be buried in a location different from that specified in his will. He was buried at Yuelamu, which had been the preference of his community and daughters, several weeks after his death.

Posthumously, Tjapaltjarri's works are drawing increasing attention. The artist's majestic painting Warlugulong (previously bought by the Commonwealth Bank for just $1,200) was auctioned by Sotheby's on 24 July 2007. Pre-auction, the work was expected to make art history as the most expensive Aboriginal canvas at auction. The work had been tipped to fetch up to A$2.5 million, more than double the then-record for Aboriginal art at auction. The work, in fact, sold for $2.4 million; the following day, it was revealed that the National Gallery of Australia had been the buyer. The Gallery's purchase eased tensions of a rumoured Government legal intervention had the work been purchased by an overseas buyer, out of concern that significant indigenous art would be "lost" overseas.

== Major collections ==
- Art Gallery of New South Wales
- Holmes à Court Collection
- Kelton Foundation
- National Gallery of Australia
- Kluge-Ruhe Aboriginal Art Collection of the University of Virginia
- Redrock Gallery, Melbourne

== See also ==
- Art of Australia
