= Earth's Creation =

1994 painting by Emily Kame Kngwarreye

- Artist: Emily Kame Kngwarreye
- Year: 1994
- Medium: Acrylic paint on canvas
- Dimensions: 275.0 cm × 632.0 cm (108.3 in × 248.8 in)

Earth's Creation is a 1994 painting by the Australian Aboriginal artist Emily Kame Kngwarreye. It was painted in 1994 at Utopia, Northern Territory, north east of Alice Springs in central Australia.

== Artist and painting ==
Kngwarreye was a senior Anmatyerre woman, who only commenced painting when she was aged about 80. In the following eight years, she produced 3,000 or more paintings, an average of one painting per day.

Earth's Creation is described as part of her "high-colourist" phase. It is regarded as one of the artist's masterpieces, representing in her words the "whole lot... everything" – Earth's Creation. The swirling blues, greens and yellows evoke what Kngwarreye called the "green time", after the rains come and the bush erupts with new life in her country, Alhalkere. She painted with a "dump dot" technique, also known as "dump dump", using her brush to pound the acrylic paint onto the canvas and create layers of colour and movement.

Due to its large size, the work was painted in four panels. These were stitched together during painting, then subsequently stretched individually.

Kngwarreye's paintings are described by leading international art academics as being equal to the works of Monet and great abstract artists such as Jackson Pollock, Willem de Kooning, and Mark Rothko. Experts have argued that Earth's Creation, painted at Utopia on the edge of the Simpson Desert in Central Australia by an Australian with no formal or informal training in art, is an even more important painting for Australia than American painter Jackson Pollock's Blue Poles, purchased by the National Gallery of Australia in 1973.

== Painting history ==
After being held in a private collection, Earth’s Creation was purchased by the Mbantua Gallery & Cultural Museum at the Lawson-Menzies auction in Sydney on 23 May 2007 for $1,056,000. At the time, this was the world record price for Aboriginal art and for a work by a female Australian artist.

On the request of the National Museum of Australia, Earth's Creation was loaned immediately on purchase to tour in Tokyo and Osaka in Japan in 2007, and to be exhibited at the National Museum in Canberra in 2008. It was exhibited in the Great Hall of Parliament House in Darwin before heading to Alice Springs, where it had never been displayed publicly.

In 2015 the work was exhibited in the Giardini Central Pavilion at the 56th Venice Biennale, "All the World’s Futures", curated by Okwui Enwezor.

Earth's Creation was sold at auction in 2017 to New York-based dealer Tim Olsen for a client for $2.1 million, breaking the record it had set in 2015 for the highest sale price achieved by an Australian female artist.
