= Emily Kame Kngwarreye =

Aboriginal Australian artist (1910–1996)

- Emily Kame Kngwarreye in 1992
- Born: c.1910 Alhalkere, Utopia, Northern Territory, Australia
- Died: 3 September 1996 (aged 85–86); Alice Springs, Northern Territory, Australia
- Other name: Emily Kam Ngwarray
- Known for: Painting, contemporary indigenous Australian art
- Notable work: Earth's Creation

Emily Kame Kngwarreye, (Note: The most recognised spelling shown in sources is 'Emily Kame Kngwarreye', as used in this article. However, based on recent orthography, there is emerging use of 'Emily Kam Kngwarray'. The National Gallery of Australia's 2023 solo exhibition adopted the new spelling of the artist's name following consultation regarding updated Anmatyerr orthography, and it was the first time the new spelling was used; this occurred 14 years after the orthography was updated, and 27 years after the artist's death. In 2025 the NGA exhibition continued on to Tate Modern in London in an exhibition of her work titled Emily Kam Kngwarray.) also spelled Emily Kam Kngwarray, (c. 1910 – 1996) was an Aboriginal Australian (Anmatyerr) artist from Alhalker, in the Sandover region of the Northern Territory. Kngwarreye's unique style and powerful creative vision came to redefine contemporary Aboriginal art and gained worldwide attention.

One of the world's most significant contemporary painters to emerge in the twentieth century, Kngwarreye practised in batik and painting on canvas, creating art that embodied her detailed knowledge of the places she lived in throughout her life. She layered motifs representing the plants, animals and geological features that formed the desert ecosystems around her.

Beginning in batik in 1977 and moving to painting on canvas in 1988, she also occasionally worked on paper. In the early 1990s Kngwarreye made some prints, including etchings and linocuts. Creating an expansive catalogue of works in her life, Kngwarreye was at the forefront of the Aboriginal artistic revolution in Australia.

Kngwarreye died in 1996 and posthumously represented Australia at the Venice Biennale in 1997. Her work has made an immense impact in Australia and globally, and has inspired many new generations of artists.

== Life and family ==
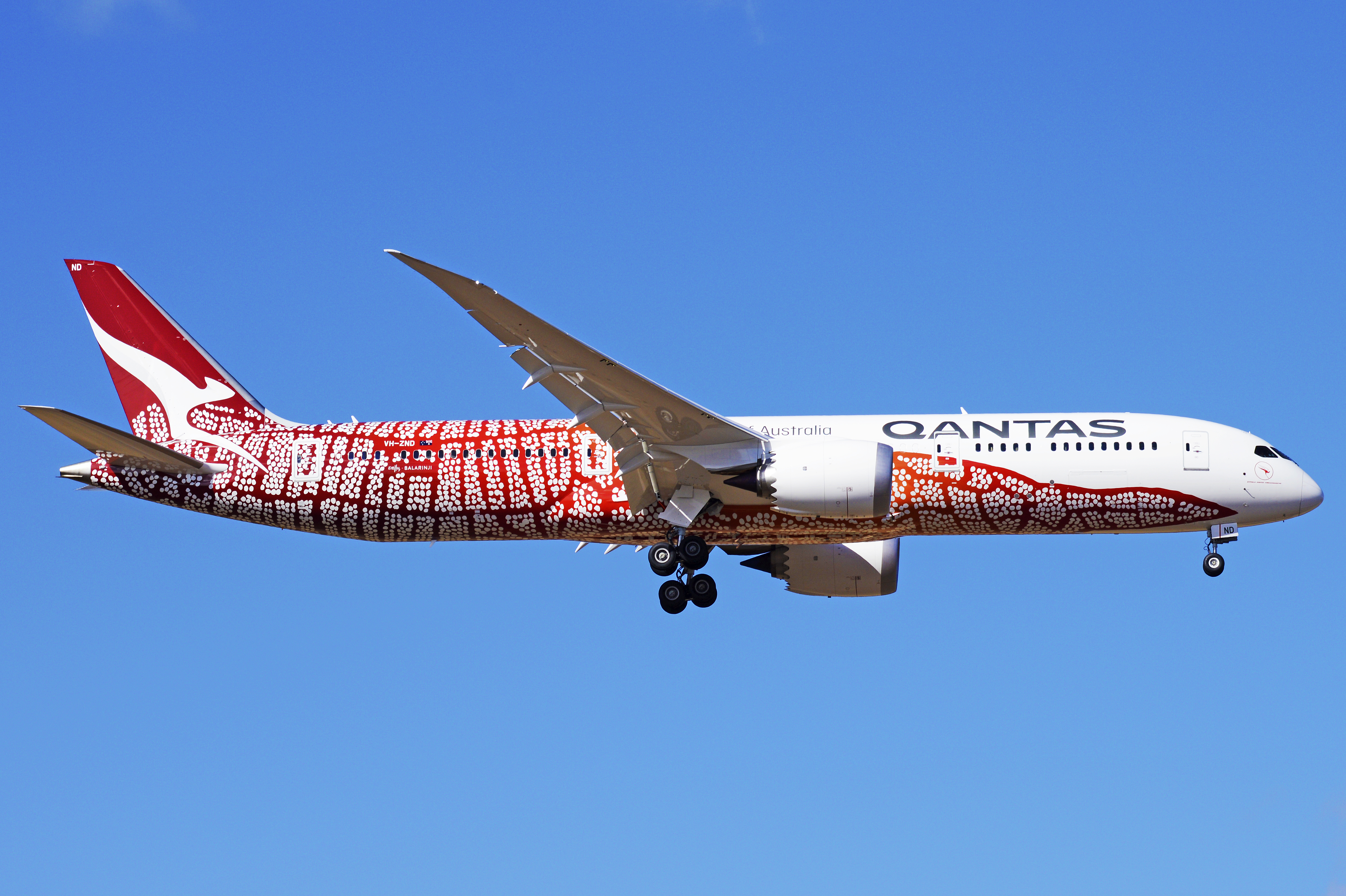
A Qantas aircraft, Boeing 787-9 Dreamliner VH-ZND, is named Emily Kame Kngwarreye and painted in a special livery based on her work Yam Dreaming

Emily Kame Kngwarreye was born c.1910 in Alhalker in the Utopia Homelands, an Aboriginal community located approximately 250 kilometres north-east of Alice Springs (Mparntwe).

Her family was Anmatyerr, and she was the youngest of three. She had no biological children of her own. She was the sister-in-law of the artist Minnie Pwerl and the aunt of Pwerle's daughter, artist Barbara Weir. Kngwarreye was a parental custodian of Weir for seven years until Weir was forcibly removed from her homeland under a government program to assimilate mixed-race children (see Stolen Generations). Kngwarreye's great niece is the painter Jeannie Pwerle. Her brother's children are Gloria Pitjana Mills and Dolly Pitjana Mills.

Kngwarreye grew up working on cattle stations. In June 1934 she moved to the MacDonald Downs Homestead, located approximately 100 km (62 mi) east of Alhalkere, to work in the house and muster cattle.

Kngwarreye died in Alice Springs in September 1996.

== Art practice ==
As an elder and ancestral custodian of the Anmatyerr people, Kngwarreye had for decades painted for ceremonial purposes in the Utopia region. She became known for her precise and detailed approach she worked with batik for 11 years until 1988, when she was introduced to acrylics. She created more than 3,000 acrylic paintings over the next eight years, and became one of the most prominent and successful artists in the history of Indigenous Australian art. She is particularly notable also for being a female artist, for having only started painting in her 70s, and for her prolificacy: over her eight years as an artist, she produced more than 3,000 paintings – around one per day.

She lived and worked at various places in the Sandover region.

=== Batik ===
In the 1970s, Kngwarreye undertook a short adult education course which it included various creative practices, including such as tie-dyeing and batik. In 1977, she began to learn batik under the early guidance of a Pitjantjatjara artist from Ernabella named Yipati and instructors Suzanne Bryce, Jenny Green and Julia Murray. According to Bryce, Aboriginal women in the region wanted to learn handcrafts because they were especially suited for a traditional lifestyle. Bryce and Green had imported the medium of batik to the Northern Territories from Indonesia in 1974.

By the time Kngwarreye was introduced to the technique, Aboriginal artists had adapted key parts of the process to suit their own preferences. The Indonesian technique of applying wax with a pen-like instrument called a canting, for example, had been replaced by brushes, which often produced broader, more animated patterns on the fabric. The introduction of batik marked a new era for Aboriginal women in the Northern Territories. Up to that point, their role had been to assist male painters, with only a few women ever creating their own works.

In 1978, Kngwarreye and other prominent Aboriginal artists founded the Utopia Women's Batik Group, comprising around 21 women. Initially a communal project, the program evolved into a framework where artists could develop their own individual styles. Kngwarreye's batik work shows elements that recur in her later paintings, including the awelye (body painting), emus, goannas, and other flora and fauna of her Country.

=== Acrylic painting ===
Kngwarreye began to paint on canvas in the summer of 1988, with a painting project initiated by CAAMA Shop in association with Utopia Art Sydney. Titled A Summer Project, it was eventually acquired by the Holmes à Court Collection in West Perth which then sponsored a program to allow Utopia artists to paint for a period of time unhindered by commercial imperatives. Rodney Gooch, manager of the Central Australian Aboriginal Media Association (CAAMA), distributed 100 canvases and paints to the Utopia women, where they instructed the artists in the new medium. Over the summer holidays, (4 weeks) 80 painters completed 81 works. Rodney Gooch saw this as a new era for women. The Holmes à Court Collection purchased all 81 paintings and through their curator Anne Marie Brody, they were exhibited in April at the S.H. Ervin Gallery, Sydney.

Kngwarreye once described her transition to acrylic painting as a less labor-intensive process that better suited her advancing years:

I did batik at first, and then after doing that I learned more and more and then I changed over to painting for good...Then it was canvas. I gave up on...fabric to avoid all the boiling to get the wax out. I got a bit lazy – I gave it up because it was too much hard work. I finally got sick of it ... I didn't want to continue with the hard work batik required – boiling the fabric over and over, lighting fires, and using up all the soap powder, over and over. That's why I gave up batik and changed over to canvas – it was easier. My eyesight deteriorated as I got older, and because of that I gave up batik on silk – it was better for me to just paint.

Her method was to place large sections of canvas on the ground and sit on them cross-legged. She applied paint using a long brush to reach across and into the creation. In one account, a dealer explained the presence of dog prints within a specific painting as a natural part of her ground-level method: "The dog walked across it," he said, "and she couldn't have cared less."

In 1995, in the last year of her life, she painted Anwerlarr anganenty ("Big yam Dreaming"), on a huge canvase measuring over 8 m (26 ft) by nearly 3 m (9.8 ft).

In the final two weeks of her life, Kngwarreye asked her nephew Fred Torres for materials to produce a series known today as My Country - Final Series, 1996. A gallerist of Indigenous art in Sydney once described the period as an energetic push to create: "With no other materials, she dipped her one-inch gesso brush into a pot of paint. Over the next few days Emily painted 24 canvases like nothing she had ever done before."

=== Subject matter and themes ===
Works by Kngwarreye stem from a deep connection her tribal homeland, Alhalkere. The Museum of Contemporary Art Australia describes her subject matter as the "essence" of that region, with references to flora, fauna and Dreamtime figures from her environment. These include:

- Arlatyeye (pencil yam)
- Arkerrthe (mountain devil lizard)
- Ntange (grass seed)
- Tingu (a Dreamtime pup)
- Ankerre (emu)
- Intekwe (a favourite food of emus, a small plant)
- Atnwerle (green bean)
- Kame (yam seed pod)

The pencil yam, or anwerlarr, a vine with heart-shaped leaves and seed pods that resemble beans, was an important source of food for the Aboriginal people of the desert. She painted many works on this theme; often her first actions at the start of a painting were to put down the yam tracking lines. This plant was especially significant for her: her middle name, Kame, means the yellow flower and the seeds of the pencil yam.

=== Style ===
Anooralya (1996) or Yam, painted about five months before her death

Works by Kngwarreye are rooted in marks painted on sand and the body during Anmatyere experiences within The Dreaming, a moral code based on "ancestral heroes whose pioneering travels gave form, shape, and meaning to the land, seas, and skies in a long-ago creative era". These ceremonial marks are therefore more than basic visual designs. They are a "ritual re-enactment of the Ancestors' Dreamtime travelling (sic) which, in Aboriginal mythology, is synonymous with the creation of the world".

Visual elements related to The Dreaming were important parts of the Desert Art Movement at Papunya Tula, where Kngwarreye first began to develop her skills as a painter. Formed by community elders in 1971 with the support of Geoffey Bardon, the school encouraged artists to develop their own ideas when painting on canvas. One familiar style was to overlap masses of tiny dots to create the optical effect of a heat shimmer, which appears in works by Kngwarreye as well as those of Johnny Warangkula Tjupurrula. The influence of Desert Art also appears in her use of aerial perspective.

Her early works of the late 1980s used traditional colours such as red and yellow ochre, black and white. By 1990, she had expanded her palette to also include grey, purple, and brown, which amplified the atmospheric qualities of her work.

In 1992, Kngwarreye began to join her dots to form lines, creating multicoloured parallel horizontal and vertical stripes that suggested rivers and desert terrain. She also began to use larger brushes during this period, which produced heavier, less intricate dots on the canvas.

In 1993, Kngwarreye added patches of colour along with the dots, which created the effect of coloured rings. An example is Alaqura Profusion, which was made with a shaving brush in what she called her "dump dump" style, using very bright colours. That technique also appears in My Mothers Country and Emu Country (1994). The Alhalkere Suite (1993) was a huge installation comprising 22 canvases, depicting her Country after flooding and regeneration, in a style similar to Expressionist art.

In the mid-1990s, she started working with thick stripes of acrylic paint on paper and canvas, which look abstract but are actually derived from awelye, the designs painted on Anmatyerr women's bodies for ceremony. The interwoven lines frequently reference the track lines of yams within Central Desert communities.

For many years, her varied style attracted labels from the art world such as modernism and abstraction, placing them in the traditions of Western art. However, it is argued by Indigenous Australian curators that her work is deeply rooted in Aboriginal Australian traditions, in particular, connection to Country.

== Recognition and awards ==
In 1992/3, Kngwarreye was awarded an Australian Artist's Creative Fellowship by prime minister Paul Keating and the Australia Council.

In 1993, Kngwarreye, Yvonne Koolmatrie, and Judy Watson were chosen to represent Australia at the Venice Biennale.

She was inducted into the Victorian Honour Roll of Women, 2001.

== Exhibitions and gallery holdings ==
The first public exhibition of Kngwarreye's silk batiks was in 1980, alongside works of Mona Byrne, an artist from Hermannsberg. The next year, Floating Forests of Silk premiered at the Adelaide Festival Centre, curated by Silver Harris. In 1982, her work was on display at the Sydney Craft Expo and the Brisbane Commonwealth Games Exhibition, followed by showings at the Adelaide Festival Centre and the Alice Springs Craft Council in 1983.

Kngwarreye's first solo exhibition, titled "First Solo Show" was held in 1990 at Utopia Art Sydney.

Her work was included in a 1996 exhibition at Monash University Gallery called Women hold up half the sky: The orientation of art in the post-war Pacific.

Kngwarreye represented Australia at the 1997 Venice Biennale alongside Yvonne Koolmatrie and Judy Watson. Their exhibition, titled "Fluent", was a multigenerational show, chosen "to highlight the spectrum of Aboriginal experience and artistic practice in Australia at the time". A contemporary review described the show as an "affirmation of the continuing influence of Aboriginal matriarchs in a society that is often defined as a patriarchy ... with interwoven concerns about the nature of the land and their connections to it".

In 1998, her batiks were on view at the National Gallery of Victoria (NGV), Melbourne, in an exhibition titled Raiki Wara: Long Cloth from Aboriginal Australia and the Torres Strait.

Queensland Art Gallery held the first retrospective of Kngwarreye's work in 1998. It was curated by Margo Neale and featured a commissioned work by Kngwarreye for the opening. The exhibition was the first major national touring retrospective for an Indigenous artist in Australia, travelling to the Art Gallery of New South Wales, the NGV, and the National Gallery of Australia (NGA) in Canberra.

From June to November 2000, the NGA presented Aboriginal Art in Modern Worlds: World of Dreamings, consisting of works by Kngwarreye, Nym Bandak, Rover Thomas, John Mawurndjul, Fiona Foley, Tracey Moffatt, and artists from Ramingining and Wik communities. Prior to its opening in Canberra, the exhibit also traveled to the Hermitage Museum in Saint Petersburg, Russia.

Her second retrospective, Utopia: The Genius of Emily Kame Kngwarreye, was held in 2008. Also curated by Neale, it opened at the National Museum of Art, Osaka, Japan, before moving to The National Art Center, Tokyo, and then finishing at the National Museum of Australia, Canberra.

From November 2010 to March 2011, the Museum Ludwig in Cologne, Germany, presented Remembering Forward: Painting by Australian Aborigines Since 1960. The show featured works by Kngwarreye and eight other Aboriginal artists, including Paddy Bedford, Queenie McKenzie, and Dorothy Napangardi.

Wild Yam and Emu Food (1990), Kame Yam Awelye (1996), and Alhakere (1996) were shown at Gagosian Beverly Hills in 2019 alongside works by ten other Indigenous artists, most from the Northern Territory.

Utopia Art Sydney organised a major survey of Kngwarreye's career in March 2020. The exhibition was titled STRONG. Also in early 2020, D'Lan Contemporary staged an exhibition of her work in New York City at the High Line Nine gallery in Chelsea.

Kngwarreye's work was included in the 2021 exhibition Women in Abstraction at the Centre Pompidou.

In 2022, Gagosian Paris organised the first solo exhibition of her paintings in France, in collaboration with D'Lan Contemporary, Melbourne. The title of the exhibition was Emily: Desert Painter of Australia. It ran from 21 January to 26 March.

In January 2023, a major retrospective at the NGA titled Emily Kam Kngwarray, co-curated by Aboriginal curators Kelli Cole and Hetti Perkins, puts its focus on Country, community, and ancestral knowledge in Kngwarreye's artworks. In consultation with the artists family and elders in the community, 89 works were selected to show the link between Kngwarreye's paintings and her Country, Alhalkere. The exhibition aimed to overturn the western lens which saw her art as abstract and modern, and place it within ancient Aboriginal art practices, which look again and again at the landscape, flora and fauna, and ancestral stories of the traditional lands.

In 2025 the NGA exhibition continued on to the Tate Modern in an exhibition of her work titled Emily Kam Kngwarray.

== Representation and commissions ==
Kngwarreye was part of the Utopia Women's Batik. In 1987 Rodney Gooch, manager of CAAMA shop in Alice Springs was asked to represent them, and did so until 1991.

Christopher Hodges of Utopia Art Sydney represented Kngwarreye from 1988 until her death in 1996. from 1988 - 1991 through CAAMA Shop and following that directly through Rodney Gooch (Mulga Bore Artists)

In 1989, Delmore Gallery on the Delmore Downs homestead adjacent to Utopia commissioned 1,500 works from Kngwarreye. Delmore Downs operators Donald and Janet Holt sold Kngwarreye's work to elite galleries in Australia and gifted works to institutions.

By 1991 she was producing a range of work for a variety of galleries, including the Aboriginal Gallery of Dreamings in Melbourne and the DACOU Aboriginal Gallery - Dreaming Art Centre of Utopia, Adelaide.

== Sales and exploitation ==
Eight paintings by Kngwarreye in Sotheby's 2000 Winter Auction were sold for a combined amount of A$507,550, with Awelye (1989) going for A$156,500.

On 23 May 2007, Tim Jennings of Mbantua Gallery & Cultural Museum purchased Kngwarry's 1994 painting Earth's Creation I at auction for A$1,056,000. The sale set a record for an Australian female artist. In 2017 Earth's Creation I sold again for A$2,100,000 at a Cooee Art Gallery auction, breaking its own record.

In 2019 the Tate Gallery in London purchased Untitled (Alhalkere) (1989), Untitled (1990), and Edunga (1990).

The rise in market demand in the 1990s for works by Indigenous artists spurred the growth of inexperienced, and, in some cases, fraudulent art dealers. Utopia became particularly attractive to outsiders seeking fast money through the acquisition of Indigenous art without understanding the culture that produced them. She was later documented saying that those who sought a quick profit from Indigenous art were employing a "strategy of producing bad quality paintings for bad people".

During her life, and after her death, authors and journalists reported that many of the works purportedly painted by Kngwarreye were, in fact, fakes. In 1997, the Northern Territory News suggested an organised "school" of painters had created works in her style.

In 2018, British artist Damien Hirst was alleged to have copied Kngwarreye's style for his "Veil" series. The artist claimed to have had no prior knowledge of her work, even though observers from the Utopia community viewed the similarities as too close to have been a coincidence. According to Hirst, the series was rooted in Pointillism, Impressionism, and Post-Impressionism. Bronwyn Bancroft, an Indigenous artist and Arts Law Centre board member, said: "You can't actually copyright style... [but] in many ways it's what's called a moral copyright element".

== See also ==
- Australian art
- Indigenous Australian art
