= Dem Mob =

Aboriginal Australian hip hop group

Dem Mob, stylised as DEM MOB, is an Aboriginal hip hop group from the APY lands in northern South Australia, the first to rap in the Pitjantjatjara language. The band has performed widely in Australia as well as overseas, won several awards at the South Australian Music Awards (2023 and 2025), and also work as music educators in the APY lands. In 2026 they will be involved in teaching a newly-developed SACE Certificate II music course at the new Fregon Anangu School at Kaltjiti.

== Background ==
Starting out as a musical trio comprising Jontae Lawrie and Elisha Umuhuri and their teacher Matt Gully, the young rappers were partially inspired by Baker Boy, with their collaboration was instigated as part of a school project at Ernabella Anangu school. It came about partly to keep Lawrie (the younger of the duo) in school, and provide support for him following a tragic death in the family. In a region dominated by reggae music, they wanted to inspire the local youth with something different. The pair was brought by Northern Sound System to WOMADelaide in March 2020 to be recorded while performing live in front of an audience for the first time. Later that year they were joined by Basso Edwards. All three are from Pukatja (although Jontae lived in Ceduna as a young child) and have since released several music videos and performed live at festivals in Adelaide and Alice Springs. They rap in English and Pitjantjatjara languages, the first to do so in this Aboriginal Australian language, and have family ties to members of No Fixed Address, Yothu Yindi and Coloured Stone.

All band members are alumni of the Centre for Aboriginal Studies in Music, part of the Elder Conservatorium of Music at the University of Adelaide.

== Career ==
Dem Mob performed at Tandanya for the Treaty Festival (part of NAIDOC Week) in November 2020.

In January 2021, the band, along with nine other groups and solo artists, were selected to participate in a year-long program of music workshops and other activities, in the WOMADelaide X NSS Academy.

In April/May 2021, Dem Mob performed at the Wide Open Space festival in Alice Springs.

In July 2021, Dem Mob were scheduled to perform at Tandanya as part of the Illuminate Adelaide festival, at an event called Kinara (meaning "moon" in the Pintupi language); however, the state's first 7-day lockdown due to the COVID-19 pandemic took place from 21 to 27 July, and most of the Illuminate Adelaide events had to be cancelled or postponed.

In August 2021 the band released "Still No Justice", which talks about the Black Lives Matter movement, Aboriginal deaths in custody and racism in Australia, and urges Aboriginal youth growing up in Alice Springs to turn away from crime, as they grow up to be the new community elders. The song was inspired by the shooting death of Kumanjayi Walker at the hands of Northern Territory police officer Zachary Rolfe in 2019.

In mid-2022 Dem Mob was selected for the second round of WOMADelaide X NSS Academy, and in March 2023 performed at WOMADelaide.

They released their song "Soul of the Lion", described as a "powerful anthem", in March 2023. In May 2023 it was announced that DEM MOB would be playing at the 2023 Primavera Sound music festival in Barcelona, Spain, which runs from 29 May to 4 June. They were invited, along with musicians from the Centre for Aboriginal Studies in Music (commonly known as CASM), by Primavera Pro director Elena Barreras, after she had toured Adelaide as part of the promotion of Adelaide as a UNESCO City of Music and seen them perform at WOMADelaide. Making their international debut there, they were the first Aboriginal band to play at the festival.

In March 2024, Dem Mob performed at the Kulilaya Festival at Umuwa in the APY Lands to belatedly celebrate the 40th anniversary of the 1981 APY Land Rights Act, along with other Aboriginal performers including Docker River Band, the Iwiri Choir, Mala, the Pukatja Band, and Desert Rain. In June 2024, they performed at Damrosch Park in New York City along with Electric Fields, presented by the Lincoln Center in collaboration with Adelaide, City of Music.

On 29 August 2024 they released the music video of "I'll Get By", about their mental health struggles as they relocated to Adelaide from the APY Lands, and their increased profile as musicians. Natasha Wanganeen directed the film, along with Maxx Corkindale and Shannon Dowling. On 5 October 2024 they played at BIGSOUND in Brisbane.

In November 2024 they released "DIP", about being racially profiled by police.

On 15 March 2025, Dem Mob shared headline billing with Troy Cassar-Daley at the Umeewarra Downtown Aboriginal Music Festival in Port Augusta, at which Barkandji singer-songwriter Nancy Bates also performed.

The opening of the new school building for Fregon Anangu School in early November 2025 was celebrated by a concert in which students performed live alongside local and regional bands, including the Kaltjiti Travellers, PJ Reggae, Desert Melody, The Fregon Band, Tjupi Band, Eastern Arrernte Band, Coloured Rainbow, and the Laranpa Band. DEM MOB partnered with Barkaa to run workshops in performance, songwriting, and stagecraft for students, with some writing original songs to perform at the concert. DEM MOB collaborated with TAFE SA to create a new SACE Certificate II in music course, for which some of the band members will teach in Pitjantjatjara.

On 28 November 2025 the band released a new song, titled "Suit Vibes". They have not yet released an album. On 29 November 2025, Dem Mob supported Lenny Kravitz at the concert following the BP Adelaide Grand Final motor racing event in Adelaide, and in 2026 will be supporting Regurgitator on a national tour between February and May.

== Other performances and activities ==
Dem Mob have also performed at the Art Gallery of South Australia in its "First Fridays" series, and have supported J-MILLA and Electric Fields.

They also work in schools in the APY lands and Ceduna, helping students to learn through music and improving their literacy skills.

== Personal ==
The musical profile afforded by Dem Mob has given Umuhuri the opportunity to connect with his biological family. He was born in New Zealand before being adopted by a family living in the Northern Territory as a two-week-old baby, and in his early years travelled around with his adoptive family as his parents followed employment opportunities. When Dem Mob were performing in Alice Springs in 2022, one of his cousins was sent from New Zealand to watch them by his biological mother. Umuhuri appreciates finding the connection to his homeland and family roots, but sees himself as a Pitjantjatjara / Yankunytjatjara man, as he was brought up in this culture.

== Awards and nominations ==
- 2021: Finalist, Best Regional or Torres Strait Islander Artist, South Australian Music Awards (SAMA)
- 2021: Finalist, Best Hip-Hop Act, SAMA
- 2022: Finalist, Best Regional or Torres Strait Islander Artist, SAMA
- 2022: Finalist, Best Hip-Hop Act, SAMA
- 2023: Winner, 5 awards: Best Hip Hop Act, Best Aboriginal or Torres Strait Islander Artist, Best Regional Artist, Best Educator, and the Emily Burrows Award (an APRA AMCOS award worth $5000), at the SA Music Awards
- 2024: Robert Stigwood Fellowship, providing mentorship and professional development, by the Music Development Office
- 2025: Winner, 4 awards: Best Regional Artist, Best Aboriginal or Torres Strait Islander Artist, Best Music Educator, Best Hip Hop, SAMA

2026: Winner of 3 awards.

== Discography ==
=== Singles ===
- "Still No Justice" (2021)
- "Soul of the Lion" (2023)
- "DIP" (2024)
- "I'll Get By" (2024)
- "Suit Vibes" (2025)
- "Dream" (2026)
- "Break Bread" (2026)
- "Frequency" (2026)
