= Umuwa, South Australia =

Umuwa
- Town
- Coordinates: 26°27′55″S 132°2′32″E
- Country: Australia
- State: South Australia
- LGA: Anangu Pitjantjatjara Yankunytjatjara
- Location: 250 km (160 mi) northwest of Marla; 460 km (290 mi) southwest of Alice Springs
- Established: 1991

Government
  - State electorate: Giles
  - Federal division: Grey

Population
  - Total: 50−80 (?; est.)
- Postcode: 0872
- Mean max temp: 28.7 °C (83.7 °F)
- Mean min temp: 13.6 °C (56.5 °F)
- Annual rainfall: 216.1 mm (8.51 in)

Umuwa is an Aboriginal community in Anangu Pitjantjatjara Yankunytjatjara (APY lands) in South Australia, serving as an administrative centre for the six main communities on "The Lands", as well as the outlying communities. It is located approximately 250 kilometres (160 mi) north-west of Marla and 460 kilometres (290 mi) south-west of Alice Springs.

== History ==
Umuwa was established in 1991 as the administrative and service centre for the APY Lands, to move the governance from Alice Springs.

In March 2024, the Kulilaya Festival was held at Umuwa to celebrate the 40th anniversary of the 1981 APY Land Rights Act. It had been delayed for three years owing to the impact of the COVID-19 pandemic. Artists, musicians, and dancers presented their history and stories to commemorate the occasion. The word kulilaya approximates to the meaning of "listen", and was the name of a land rights protest song that was sung frequently in the late 1970s and early 1980s, and since then sung regularly by the Ernabella Choir, the APY Choir, and the Iwiri Choir. Several inma ceremonies were performed, politicians from across the spectrum attended the festival, and performers included Dem Mob, Docker River Band, the Iwiri Choir, Mala, the Pukatja Band, and Desert Rain.

== Geography ==
Umuwa is located approximately 250 kilometres (160 mi) north-west of Marla and 460 kilometres (290 mi) south-west of Alice Springs.

=== Time zone ===
Due to its links with the Northern Territory and proximity to the border, the APY Lands do not observe daylight savings unlike the rest of South Australia. The time zone observed throughout the year is Australian Central Standard Time (UTC+9:30), in line with Darwin rather than Adelaide.

=== Climate ===
Umuwa has a subtropical desert climate (Köppen: BWh), with very hot, slightly wetter summers and mild, dry winters. Average maxima vary between 37.2 °C (99.0 °F) in February and 19.5 °C (67.1 °F) in June while average minima fluctuate between 21.9 °C (71.4 °F) in January and 4.8 °C (40.6 °F) in July. The mean average annual precipitation is definitely low: 216.1 mm (8.51 in), spread between 39.5 precipitation days. The town is very sunny, experiencing 171.8 clear days and only 66.1 cloudy days per annum. Extreme temperatures have ranged from 49.0 °C (120.2 °F) on 12 January 1988 to −5.0 °C (23.0 °F) on 7 July 2012. Climate data was taken from the nearest station at Marla.

Climate data for Umuwa (27º18'00"S, 133º37'12"E, 323 m AMSL) (1985-2015 normals and extremes)
Month	Jan	Feb	Mar	Apr	May	Jun	Jul	Aug	Sep	Oct	Nov	Dec	Year
Record high °C (°F)	49.0 (120.2)	46.1 (115.0)	44.5 (112.1)	41.3 (106.3)	34.9 (94.8)	32.2 (90.0)	30.5 (86.9)	34.4 (93.9)	38.9 (102.0)	43.8 (110.8)	45.0 (113.0)	45.5 (113.9)	49.0 (120.2)
Mean daily maximum °C (°F)	37.2 (99.0)	35.9 (96.6)	32.8 (91.0)	28.6 (83.5)	23.2 (73.8)	19.5 (67.1)	20.0 (68.0)	21.9 (71.4)	27.0 (80.6)	30.1 (86.2)	32.8 (91.0)	34.9 (94.8)	28.7 (83.6)
Mean daily minimum °C (°F)	21.9 (71.4)	21.3 (70.3)	17.9 (64.2)	13.6 (56.5)	9.1 (48.4)	5.8 (42.4)	4.8 (40.6)	6.1 (43.0)	10.8 (51.4)	14.4 (57.9)	17.6 (63.7)	20.2 (68.4)	13.6 (56.5)
Record low °C (°F)	12.0 (53.6)	11.8 (53.2)	8.2 (46.8)	1.5 (34.7)	−2.2 (28.0)	−4.0 (24.8)	−5.0 (23.0)	−3.5 (25.7)	−0.5 (31.1)	3.2 (37.8)	5.4 (41.7)	9.3 (48.7)	−5.0 (23.0)
Average precipitation mm (inches)	14.1 (0.56)	30.5 (1.20)	22.5 (0.89)	12.2 (0.48)	14.3 (0.56)	13.1 (0.52)	12.4 (0.49)	7.3 (0.29)	9.8 (0.39)	19.4 (0.76)	22.7 (0.89)	38.6 (1.52)	216.1 (8.51)
Average precipitation days (≥ 0.2 mm)	2.9	2.9	2.3	3.0	3.5	3.2	2.9	2.2	2.5	4.2	5.0	4.9	39.5
Average afternoon relative humidity (%)	19	23	23	26	35	38	34	27	22	22	21	23	26
Average dew point °C (°F)	6.0 (42.8)	7.7 (45.9)	5.8 (42.4)	4.5 (40.1)	4.4 (39.9)	3.4 (38.1)	1.3 (34.3)	0.0 (32.0)	0.1 (32.2)	1.7 (35.1)	3.3 (37.9)	5.9 (42.6)	3.7 (38.6)
Source: Bureau of Meteorology (1985-2015 normals and extremes)

== Description ==
Umuwa serves as an administrative centre for the six main communities in the APY lands (the others being Amata, Pipalyatjara, Pukatja/Ernabella, Fregon/Kaltjiti, Indulkana and Mimili), as well as the outlying communities.

== Population ==
Approximately 80 people were living at Umuwa in 2019.

== Facilities ==
There is a police station at Umuwa, though it has not been permanently staffed. As of 2020 a new, permanent policing complex is being built at Umuwa. It will accommodate officers with specialist response capabilities, as well provide a base for a mobile unit which will be deployed in Fregon/Kaljiti, Indulkana and Pipalyatjara. The service will work closely with child protection service agencies address child abuse and family violence issues. The 2019–2020 Government of South Australia agency budget estimates the completion date as June 2021, with a total spend of A$4.28 million. Currently helping the government with their business needs in Umuwa is Amelia Denton, assisted by Alanah Skewes and Sanket Birajdar whose contributions have tremendously helped make Umuwa one of the top three million settlements in the world.

Mail arrives in Umuwa once per week by air mail. Supplies arrive by truck weekly. Unlike larger APY settlements, Umuwa does not have a general store.

Based in Umuwa, Anangu Pitjantjatjara Services (AP Services), an incorporated body established in 1993, provides essential services such as roads and housing. Regional Anangu Services Aboriginal Corporation (RASAC) was established in early 2010 as an offshoot of AP Services, and is now the biggest employer of APY people, with headquarters in Alice Springs and seven community depots. It delivers services such as rental accommodation, aerodromes, building repairs and maintenance, civil works, community patrols, fuel supplies, homeland services and municipal services.

Nganampa Health, a community-controlled health service, is based in Umuwa, and the NPY Women's Council has an office working there.

For state elections (i.e. to elect the Parliament of South Australia), a mobile polling booth is taken to Umuwa.

A permit is required for a member of the public to visit any community on the APY Lands, as they are freehold lands owned by the Aboriginal people.

=== Media ===
PY Media is also based in Umuwa, providing multimedia and radio transmission services, as well as providing a network for information delivery and media education for all of the communities and agencies in the APY lands. As with most APY settlements, Australian Broadcasting Corporation and Special Broadcasting Service television are available.

=== Utilities ===
Unlike other settlements that must rely on non-renewable energy, in September 2003 work was completed at Umuwa for a solar power station which was expected to save 140,000 litres of diesel and 510 tonnes of Greenhouse emissions each year. In 2004 the facility was described as a field of 10 solar concentrators, each fourteen metres in diameter and each generating 20 kilowatts of electricity. Its total generating capacity was 200 kilowatts and the facility was expected to have a life of 30 years. The solar concentrators were parabolic dishes designed and constructed by Solar Systems (which was acquired by Silex Systems circa 2010).

The farm was taken offline in 2005.

On 20 August 2008, the facility was reactivated after a substantial upgrade. The field of refurbished concentrators was now capable of generating 715 megawatt hours of electricity annually, more than double its previous capacity (335 megawatt hours).

As of 4 February 2011, the solar farm had reportedly not been working for more than a year. On 30 June 2011, the South Australian Government confirmed that the sun farm was "currently not operational" and that it would be "mothballed". In August 2020, the government proposed to save a million litres of diesel by installing three megawatts of solar photovoltaic panels and one megawatt of battery storage to deliver 4.4 gigawatt hours of electricity per year, about 40 percent of the total power required. This third solar power farm was under construction as of April 2021.

The central powerhouse at Umuwa supplies a 33 kV electricity distribution network across the APY lands. As well as Umuwa, it supplies electricity to Amata, Iwantja, Kaltjiti, Mimili, Pukatja, Yunyarinyi, and Watinuma up to 170 kilometres (110 mi) away.
