= Kanpi =

Kaṉpi South Australia
- Coordinates: 26°10′03″S 130°07′06″E
- Population: 53 (2021 census)
- Postcode(s): 5710
- Elevation: 678 m (2,224 ft)
- Location: 460 km (286 mi) south-west of Alice Springs; 100 km (62 mi) west of Amaṯa
- LGA(s): Aṉangu Pitjantjatjara Yankunytjatjara
- State electorate(s): Giles
- Federal division(s): Grey

Kaṉpi is an Aboriginal community in the Aṉangu Pitjantjatjara Yankunytjatjara Lands in South Australia. It is located about 20 km (12 mi) south of the Northern Territory border at the base of the Mann Ranges. The nearby town of Nyapari is 15 km (9.3 mi) to the east.

Kaṉpi is part of the Murputja Homelands, which also includes the family outstations Angatja and Umpukulu. The residents are mostly Pitjantjatjara people with their traditional country nearby. Kaṉpi originated as an outstation for the Baker family, who relocated from other parts of the APY Lands to be closer to their ancestral country.

Due to the small population of Kaṉpi and nearby Nyapaṟi, essential services are limited and largely shared between the two communities. In Kaṉpi there is a workshop, a garage, a day care centre and an art centre. It also has a community store, built in 1996, which has a pump for petrol. Food and supplies are delivered once every two weeks. The store services both Kaṉpi and Nyapaṟi, as well as nearby outstations. Local health services are based at the clinic in Nyapaṟi. Kaṉpi and Nyapaṟi each had separate schools from 1987 until 1993, when they consolidated into the Murputja Education Centre, situated between the two communities.

== Time zone ==
Due to its links with the Northern Territory and proximity to the border, the APY Lands do not observe daylight savings unlike the rest of South Australia. The time zone observed throughout the year is Australian Central Standard Time (UTC+9:30), in line with Darwin rather than Adelaide.

== Population ==
As of 2021, the population of Kaṉpi is 53.
