= WOS =

WOS may refer to:

- Kalma Airport, IATA airport code WOS
- Worcester Shrub Hill railway station, Worcestershire, England (National Rail station code WOS)
- Wheels of Soul, an American outlaw motorcycle club
- Wide Open Space (festival), an Australian music festival in the Northern Territory
- Wilson Ornithological Society, a U.S. ornithological organisation
- Wizards of OS, a computing group
- Web of Science (WoS), a platform for bibliometrics and scientometrics
- Wos (musician), an Argentine rapper
- WOS (AM), Jefferson City, Missouri radio station, 1922–1936

== See also ==
- WhatsOnStage Awards (WOS Awards), theatre awards given by WhatsOnStage.com
- World of Sport (disambiguation), the name of various television series
- World of Sport Wrestling (WOS Wrestling), a UK wrestling promotion and television series
