= Anangu Schools =

Group of schools in South Australia

Location of Anangu schools in South Australia

Anungu schools is a group of ten schools operated by the Government of South Australia which are located in the west of the Australian state of South Australia. Eight are located in the Aboriginal lands of Anangu Pitjantjatjara Yankunytjatjara (APY lands), while one is in Maralinga Tjarutja and on in the community of Yalata, all offering primary and secondary schooling to a local body of students who are largely Aboriginal.

The word anangu means "human being", or "person", and is used by several Aboriginal Australian peoples of the Western Desert cultural bloc to describe themselves.

== APY ==
=== Amata Anangu School ===
Amata Anangu School (26°09′12″S 131°08′47″E) is located in the community of Amata. In 2018, the school offered Reception to Year 12, and had a total enrolment of 92 students of whom 84% were Indigenous and a teaching staff of 15.

=== Ernabella Anangu School ===
Ernabella Anangu School (26°17′09″S 132°08′04″E) is located in the community of Pukatja. In 2018, the school offered Reception to Year 12, and had a total enrolment of 147 students of whom 93% were Indigenous and a teaching staff of 16.

=== Fregon Anangu School ===
Fregon Anangu School (26°45′57″S 132°01′38″E) is located in the community of Kaltjiti. In 2018, the school offered Reception to Year 12, and had a total enrolment of 57 students of whom 84% were Indigenous and a teaching staff of eight.

A new school building opened in early November 2025, celebrated by a concert in which students performed live alongside local and regional bands including the Kaltjiti Travellers, PJ Reggae, Desert Melody, The Fregon Band, Tjupi Band, Eastern Arrernte Band, Coloured Rainbow, and the Laranpa Band, as well as rapper Barkaa from Sydney, and APY hip hop band DEM MOB. The school integrates traditional culture with contemporary educational methods, and now offers SACE Certificate II in music, organised by TAFE SA. DEM MOB collaborated to create the course, and some of the band members will teach in Pitjantjatjara. The school principal is Sara Porzio.

=== Indulkana Anangu School ===
Indulkana Anangu School (26°58′01″S 133°18′32″E) is located in the community of Iwantja. In 2018, the school offered Reception to Year 12, and had a total enrolment of 89 students of whom 84% were Indigenous and a teaching staff of eight.

=== Kenmore Park Anangu School ===
Kenmore Park Anangu School (26°19′44″S 132°26′42″E) is located in the community of Yunyarinyi. In 2018, the school offered Reception to Year 12, and had a total enrolment of 10 students of whom 70% were Indigenous and a teaching staff of three.

=== Mimili Anangu School ===
Mimili Anangu School (27°00′28″S 132°42′27″E) is located in the community of Mimili. In 2018, the school offered Reception to Year 12, and had a total enrolment of 67 students of whom 94% were Indigenous and a teaching staff of 10.

=== Murputja Anangu School ===
Murputja Anangu School (26°09′39″S 130°10′55″E) is located in the community of Murputja. In 2018, the school offered Reception to Year 12, and had a total enrolment of 26 students who were all Indigenous and a teaching staff of five.

=== Pipalyatjara Anangu School ===
Pipalyatjara Anangu School (26°09′50″S 129°10′15″E) is located in the community of Pipalyatjara. In 2018, the school offered Reception to Year 12, and had a total enrolment of 63 students of whom 95% were Indigenous and a teaching staff of nine.

== Maralinga Tjarutja ==
=== Oak Valley Anangu School ===
Oak Valley Anangu School (29°24′10″S 130°44′18″E) is located in the community of Oak Valley. It was formerly known as the Oak Valley Aboriginal School and was renamed on 19 July 2010 to include the word "anangu". In 2018, the school offered Reception to Year 12, and had a total enrolment of seven students who are all Indigenous and a teaching staff of five.

== Yalata ==
=== Yalata Anangu School ===
Yalata Anangu School (31°28′59″S 131°50′21″E) is located in the community of Yalata. The school, which was previously known as the Yalata Aboriginal School, was opened in 1962. In 2018, the school offered Reception to Year 12, and had a total enrolment of 80 students who were all Indigenous and a teaching staff of ten.

== See also ==
- List of Aboriginal schools in South Australia
- List of schools in South Australia
