= Mintabie, South Australia =

Mintabie
- Town
- Coordinates: 27°18′42″S 133°17′43″E
- Country: Australia
- State: South Australia
- LGA: Anangu Pitjantjatjara Yankunytjatjara
- Location: 985 km (612 mi) northwest of Adelaide; 40 km (25 mi) northwest of Marla; 406 km (252 mi) south of Alice Springs; 300 km (190 mi) northwest of Coober Pedy
- Established: 1978

Government
  - State electorate: Giles
  - Federal division: Grey
- Elevation: 353 m (1,158 ft)

Population
  - Total: 30 (2017 GSA) (Note: For the 2016 census, the population of Mintabie was included in the count for the State Suburb of Anangu Pitjantjatjara Yankunytjatjara, which had a population of 226 people.)
- Time zone: UTC+9:30 (ACST)
- Postcode: 5724
- Mean max temp: 28.7 °C (83.7 °F)
- Mean min temp: 13.6 °C (56.5 °F)
- Annual rainfall: 234.4 mm (9.23 in)

Mintabie was an opal mining community in the Anangu Pitjantjatjara Yankunytjatjara (APY lands) in South Australia. It was unique in comparison to other communities situated in the APY Lands, in that its residents were largely not of Aboriginal Australian origin, and the land had been leased to the Government of South Australia for opal mining purposes since the 1980s.

== Time zone ==
Due to its links with the Northern Territory and proximity to the border, the APY Lands do not observe daylight saving unlike the rest of South Australia. The time zone observed throughout the year is Australian Central Standard Time (UTC+9:30), in line with Darwin rather than Adelaide.

== History ==
=== Background ===
Aboriginal people were the first people to find opals in the area. During the First World War, they traded in black opals at Coober Pedy. Conditions were harsh. In 1976, with the help of new large machinery, non-Indigenous people came to the area to mine, and a small township was established.

At around the same time, Anangu began their struggle for land rights. Consequently, by the time the South Australian Parliament began to seriously consider granting land rights in the area, a growing number of opal miners were setting up operations around Mintabie.

In November 1978, a Labor Government under Don Dunstan introduced a Bill to establish Pitjantjatjara land rights. A group of miners from Mintabie voiced strong opposition to the Bill, warning that the proposed legislation would "...act against future opal prospecting and mining ... tend to hinder any other industry set up by people other than Aboriginals... [and] give no real benefit to the Aboriginals but ... cause plenty of friction with the rest of the population.

The Bill was still before Parliament when a state election was called. After the election, Anangu entered into a fresh round of negotiations with the newly elected Liberal government, under premier David Tonkin. On 2 October 1980 the Pitjantjatjara Council formally reached an agreement with the government on the provisions of a new Bill. Introduced into Parliament on 23 October 1980, the "Pitjantjatjara Land Rights Bill 1980" proposed granting Anangu title to a large area of land, which included the township of Mintabie. The Bill recognised that opal mining would continue at Mintabie and included provisions to control that activity. Certain occupancy rights were to be provided to prospectors but these would be balanced with processes that Anangu could use, if necessary, to have someone evicted from Mintabie.

In November 1980, the Mintabie Precious Stones Field was proclaimed by the government. Certain areas of this land were excluded from opal mining activity, including the township of Mintabie. Its name was assigned by notice in the Government Gazette on 25 June 1981.

In a written submission to the Select Committee, the Pitjantjatjara Council explained that while it did "not wish to interfere with any person who wishes to mine, conduct business or otherwise live at or visit Mintabie lawfully," it had serious concerns about "sly grog selling" and consequent violence in the community, so expressed a wish that the Bill should include the Mintabie area under their title to enable integrated rules to apply to the whole area. The opal miners of Mintabie – and also some from Coober Pedy – opposed the Bill, sometimes vehemently, suggesting that confrontation and bloodshed may follow if the Mintabie Precious Stones Field were excised from the Act.

=== APY Land Rights Act 1981 lease-back ===
After extensive discussions with both the Pitjantjatjara Council and the Mintabie Progress Association, the Parliamentary Select Committee recommended that the area of land covering the township of Mintabie be included in the grant of land to Anangu but would be leased back to the Crown for a period of 21 years. Such an arrangement would enable the Crown to "issue Annual Licenses to persons entering... and wishing to reside" at Mintabie.

In March 1981, the Committee tabled its report and the Bill proceeded through Parliament. On 2 October 1981, the Anangu Pitjantjatjara Yankunytjatjara Land Rights Act 1981 came into operation, giving Anangu inalienable freehold title to the APY Lands. On that day, under Section 28(2) of the Act, the township of Mintabie was "deemed to have been leased by Anangu Pitjantjatjara Yankunytjatjara to the Crown for a term of twenty-one years", until 21 October 2002.

Section 28(2) covers an area of land defined as "section 1291 Out of Hundreds (Everard)", approximately 2 square kilometres (0.77 sq mi). It is located within the Mintabie Precious Stone Field, which is approximately 200 square kilometres (77 sq mi) in size and is proclaimed for the purpose of opal mining.

=== 2009 Amendment and 2012 extension ===
In December 2009, the South Australian Parliament passed the Aṉangu Pitjantjatjara Yankunytjatjara Land Rights (Mintabie) Amendment Bill. It was an amendment to the APY Land Rights Act 1981, the Opal Mining Act 1995 and by-laws under the APY Land Rights Act 1981, affecting the residents of Mintabie. This Act changed the licensing system for residential and commercial premises effective 1 July 2012, allowing the Minister responsible for the Opal Mining Act to grant licences.

In April 2012, after several earlier extensions had been granted by APY and the Minister for Mineral Resources and Energy had taken over from the Minister of Lands as the responsible Minister, an agreement among four parties (APY, the Minister for Mineral Resources and Energy, the Minister for Aboriginal Affairs and Reconciliation, and the Mintabie Miners Progress Association) was reached. The lease on the town extended to 30 June 2027, later amended to 2 October 2027, unless conditions were fulfilled for an earlier termination.

=== 2017 Review, 2019 termination of lease ===
A 2017 report found many instances of non-compliance with the 2009 Amendment as well as other problems occurring in the settlement of Mintabie. It recommended closure of the township, with control reverting to APY. After an appeal by residents failed, the final eviction date for the township was set at 31 December 2019.

In February 2018 the state government declared that it would not renew any leases in the town, after a report found it had become a centre for illegal distribution of drugs and alcohol into the APY Lands. As all land in the town was leased from the government, and these leases were renewed every year, this amounted to a compulsory closure of the town in 2019. Management of the land would revert to the local Aboriginal land council, Anangu Pitjantjatjara Yankunytjatjara (APY).

The APY Lands executive board would not allow residents to live in the town once it was transitioned to their control, with the date originally set at 1 July 2019. This date was extended following negotiations to 3 January 2020, after residents settled the Federal Court litigation instituted to keep the town open. Falling in the middle of a heatwave, local residents complained of the difficulties of relocating at such a time.

As of 2025, the Mintabie township is no longer accessible to the public.

== Geography ==
Mintabie is situated west of the Stuart Highway and about 40 kilometres (25 mi) northwest of Marla and 985 kilometres (612 mi) northwest of Adelaide, the capital of South Australia. Mintabie is approximately 406 kilometres (252 mi) south of Alice Springs.

Mintabie sits in a geographical basin. It is therefore not surprising that there is a lake basin near Mintabie. The Mintabie Miners Progress Association describes the lake as follows:

The lake at Mintabie is fed by many small surrounding creeks. In the past 15 years, it has been filled twice. The first time was in 1988, when higher than normal rainfall filled the lake to capacity. Although the rainfall returned to normal, the lake retained water for approximately three years. Rains in 2000 again filled the lake. Today the lake has once again dried up awaiting another big rain.

The parcel of land on which Mintabie sits is leased by the State government from Anangu. The original township lease expired in 2002. On 3 December 2009, the South Australian Parliament passed the Anangu Pitjantjatjara Yankunytjatjara Land Rights (Mintabie) Amendment Act 2009. This legislation creates the framework for a new lease.

== Geology and mining ==
The ABS 1999 Yearbook for South Australia states, concerning Opal Mining at Mintabie, that:

The opal fields at Coober Pedy, Mintabie and Andamooka, together with fields in New South Wales, supply most of the world’s precious opal. The estimated value of raw opal production in South Australia was $40.7m in 1997. Most of this is exported to Hong Kong, Japan, the United States of America and Germany.

In 2007, the South Australian Department of Primary Industry and Resources described Mintabie's geology as follows:

the Eromanga Basin borders onto old basement rocks which are about 1,500 million years old and consist of granite and gneiss. Also on the western margin lie the sediments of the Officer Basin which comprise sandstone, quartzite, siltstone and shale about 500 million years old. These sediments were tilted by crustal forces and form prominent hills such as the Mount Johns Range near Marla. The opal deposits at Mintabie occur in a sandstone unit which was bleached and weathered by the same process that affected the Eromanga Basin sediments as described above.

== Climate ==
Based upon the climate records of the nearest weather station at Marla Police Station, Mintabie has maximum summer averages of 37.3 °C (99.1 °F) in January. Winter maximum averages are 19.8 °C (67.6 °F) in June. Overnight lows range from a mean minimum temperature of 22.0 °C (71.6 °F) degrees in January, to 4.8 °C (40.6 °F) in June. Annual rainfall averages 234.4 millimetres (9.23 in).

== Native fauna ==
Native animal species commonly found in and about Mintabie include the galah, thorny devil and netted dragon lizard and the larger lizard variety known as goanna.

== Population ==
In October 2017, the Government of South Australia estimated that Mintabie's population was about 30 people. It was acknowledged this increased to about 60 people at different times of the year. In the 1970s and 1980s, it had a population of over 500 people.

== Facilities ==
Mintabie has an "all-weather" airstrip, school, and 7-day supply of fuel and services. Accommodation is catered for by the Mintabie Hotel (Goanna Grill and Bar) which has 6 rooms, 2 self-contained units and also a 24-hour power caravan park. Mintabie also has another caravan park.

The Mintabie health clinic, called the "Clarice Megaw Clinic" was opened in 1990 and so named in honour of a bequest from a deceased estate which enabled health authorities to commit more resources to the region. This has now been sold by Frontier Services for an undisclosed amount to a private buyer.

The Mintabie Area School is a R-12 school with approximately 20 students. By 2009 this had fallen to only 11 enrolments. Mintabie does not have a permanent police presence but patrols are conducted in the town by the police station located at Marla.

A permit from the Anangu Pitjantjatjara Yankunytjatjara is required to access Mintabie, as the land is owned freehold by the resident Aboriginal people. Currently this is not being enforced because of unresolved issues.

For State elections (i.e. to elect the Parliament of South Australia), a mobile polling booth is taken to Mintabie.

== Trafficking of alcohol and other drugs ==
Despite long periods of government inattention, Anangu have repeatedly highlighted the negative impacts that certain individuals and businesses operating out of Mintabie have on their lives. This has included raising their concerns with representatives of the South Australian Parliament.

In October 1987, APY advised a group of parliamentarians visiting the Lands that alcohol had become a major problem for Anangu communities and that a significant amount was being brought illegally on to the Lands through Mintabie. On that occasion, Anangu called for South Australia Police (SAPOL) "to pay greater attention in Mintabie to the sale of alcohol to Aborigines."

In 1988, after visiting Anangu communities and Mintabie, a Parliamentary Committee reported that it had also been "advised of 'grog running' by persons apparently using Mintabie as the source of supplies and then selling the alcohol at inflated prices to Aboriginal people." The Committee recommended "that the matter of alcohol distribution from the Mintabie area be investigated urgently by the Police."

More than a decade later, significant problems remained. In 2002, in a written submission to a parliamentary inquiry, Iwantja Council alleged that many people at Mintabie were involved in "selling sly grog to Anangu." The submission continued:

So much grog is stored in houses [at Mintabie] that people break in to gain access to it, what follows ends in violence and as proved recently a murder resulted directly from the stored alcohol. In recent times the sale of marijuana has reached an epidemic. This is coming from Mintabie as well. The reason it continues is that the people have to be caught in the act, an almost impossible task as the Marla Police Station is about 40 kilometres (25 mi) away

A month after Iwantja made these allegations, SAPOL confirmed Mintabie as the source for a significant amount of the drugs including alcohol coming on to the APY Lands. On that occasion, SAPOL also reported that it had "recently found buried at Mintabie a large container set up with hydroponic gear that [had] been the source of cannabis for much of the lands for the past couple of years." Drugs including alcohol continue to enter the APY Lands through Mintabie. In August 2007, SAPOL arrested and charged two men at Mintabie for their alleged involvement in a "cannabis selling network."

In April 2008, the Mullighan Inquiry into child sexual abuse on the APY Lands and in state care noted SAPOL's concern that Mintabie was "being used as a staging post for the trafficking of marijuana on the Lands"

Even so, Coober Pedy has been overlooked as a source of alcohol and other drugs even though it is only 250 km south of Mintabie (during 2011 an APY citizen was murdered due to alcohol-related sales in Coober Pedy). An increase of work on the APY by contractors from Marla has also increased the amount of drugs trafficked into the APY lands.
