= Robyn Layton =

Australian lawyer and judge (born 1945)

The Honourable Robyn Layton AO KC
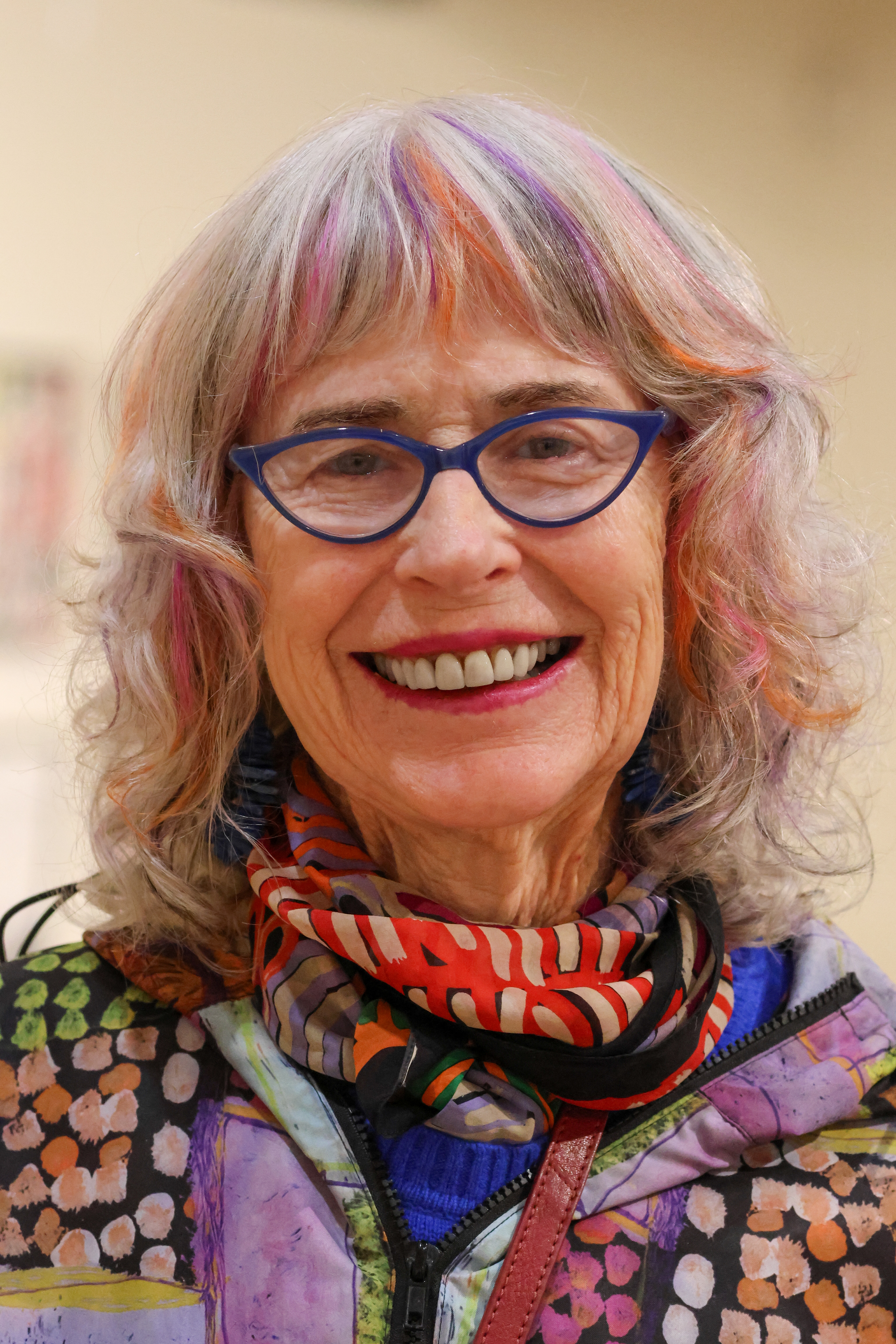
- Layton in 2026

Judge of the Supreme Court of South Australia
- In office 14 February 2005 – 3 September 2010
- Nominated by: Marjorie Jackson-Nelson
- Appointed by: Mike Rann

Personal details
- Born: Robyn Ann Layton; 16 August 1945 (age 81) Adelaide, South Australia, Australia
- Spouse: John Bannon (div. 1978)
- Children: 2
- Education: Cabra Dominican College
- Alma mater: University of Adelaide (LLB; LLM)
- Profession: Lawyer

Robyn Ann Layton (born 16 August 1945) is an Australian lawyer and former judge of the Supreme Court of South Australia from 2005 to 2010. She created the 2003 South Australian Child Protection Review, known as the Layton Report.

Layton was born in Adelaide and raised in Glenelg, she attended the Dominican convent primary school in Glenelg and eventually joined Cabra Dominican College. After her schooling, she became part of the South Australian Council for Civil Liberties before pursuing her law course at the University of Adelaide. Being among the nine women in a group of over 90 people, she acquired a Bachelor of Laws degree in 1967, while a Master of Laws degree followed in 2000.

Layton completed her articles of clerkship at Thomson Muirhead Ross & McCarthy and was admitted to the bar in 1968. After practising as a solicitor and later becoming a partner at Johnston Layton Withers and Co, she represented protestors, conscientious objectors and Aboriginal people during the Vietnam War, and was appointed solicitor to the Central Aboriginal Land Rights Committee in 1972. In 1978, she became the youngest judge in Australia upon her appointment to the South Australian Industrial Court and as Deputy President of the South Australian Industrial Commission, later serving as chair of the Classification of Publications Board and the South Australian Sex Discrimination Board, Deputy President of the Administrative Appeals Tribunal from 1985 to 1989, and a commissioner of the Health Insurance Commission.

Appointed Queen's Counsel in 1992, she became the first Australian member, and later the first female chair, of the International Labour Organization's (ILO) Committee of Experts on the Application of Conventions and Recommendations. She later appeared in cases before the Federal Court and the Supreme Court of South Australia, served on the ILO Commission of Inquiry into forced labour in Myanmar in 1997, led South Australia's 2002–2003 Child Protection Review, and was appointed the fourth woman judge of the Supreme Court of South Australia in 2005, serving until her retirement in 2010. After retiring from the bench, she continued working in judicial education, labour law, human rights, academia and community organisations.

== Early life and education ==
Robyn Ann Layton was born on 16 August 1945 in Adelaide to Dick Alex Stewart George "Barney" Layton and Mary Agnes Layton (née Halloran). Her father initially worked as a social worker before becoming a manager in the motor industry, while her mother was a teacher. Layton was raised in Glenelg and educated at the Dominican convent primary school in Glenelg before attending Cabra Dominican College. She later credited her Catholic education, especially the role played by some teachers in inspiring her interest in social justice issues. After leaving school, she joined the South Australian Council for Civil Liberties. She proceeded to study law at the University of Adelaide, having ruled out the options of becoming a teacher, a social worker, and a pharmacist. At university, she was among nine women in a class of more than 90 law students, graduating with a Bachelor of Laws in 1967. In 2000, she went on to earn a Master of Laws in general studies from the same university.

== Legal career ==
=== Early career and public advocacy (1968–1973) ===
After completing her articles of clerkship at Thomson Muirhead Ross & McCarthy, Layton was admitted to the bar in 1968. She remained with the firm as a solicitor, where she was mentored by James Henry Muirhead, John von Doussa and Allan McGregor. She later joined the Adelaide firm of Elliott Johnston, becoming a partner in what was then Johnston Layton Withers and Co (now Johnston Withers). In her early legal career, she practised across family, criminal, civil, industrial and personal injury law, with a particular focus on criminal, workers' compensation and industrial matters. From the late 1960s, during the Vietnam War, she undertook pro bono work representing protestors and conscientious objectors to conscription, and also acted for Aboriginal clients accused of criminal offences, often in collaboration with Johnston and other practitioners involved in Aboriginal legal advocacy prior to the establishment of the Aboriginal Legal Rights Movement (ALRM).

In 1972, Layton was appointed as solicitor for the Central Aboriginal Land Rights Committee, an experience that later informed her ongoing involvement with Aboriginal legal matters and contributed to later work with the Central and Northern Land Councils. In the same year, after being recommended by Ted Mullighan, she acted as legal adviser to the Rolling Stones during the band's Adelaide visit as part of their Australian tour. She accompanied the band throughout their four-day stay, attended performances, and remained available to provide legal advice due to concerns arising from previous drug-related matters involving members of the touring party. No legal issues arose during the visit. In September 1973, she was appointed solicitor assisting senior counsel appearing on behalf of Aboriginal people before Edward Woodward's Aboriginal Land Rights Commission, where she was responsible for coordinating the legal team's work, arranging the payment of counsel, and conducting consultations with Aboriginal communities in Alice Springs.

=== Industrial court and tribunal appointments (1978–1990) ===
In 1978, at the age of 32, Layton was appointed a judge of the South Australian Industrial Court and Deputy President of the South Australian Industrial Commission, becoming the youngest judge in Australia at the time. Before accepting the appointment, she sought advice from Roma Mitchell and John Jefferson Bray, both of whom encouraged her to pursue a career at the Bar. During this period, under the government of Don Dunstan, she was appointed the founding chair of South Australia's six-member Classification of Publications Board. She also served as chair of the South Australian Sex Discrimination Board. On 24 October 1979, she approved a three-year exemption under the state's anti-discrimination legislation to permit affirmative action measures aimed at increasing the number of women appointed as deputy principals in secondary schools. In August 1982, Layton ruled that successive South Australian police commissioners had unlawfully discriminated against women in recruitment, duty allocation, promotion and transfer practices following hearings that had lasted nearly two years. On 21 March 1985, Layton was appointed a full-time Deputy President of the Administrative Appeals Tribunal by Governor-General Ninian Stephen, while continuing to serve on the Industrial Court until her return to private practice in 1989.

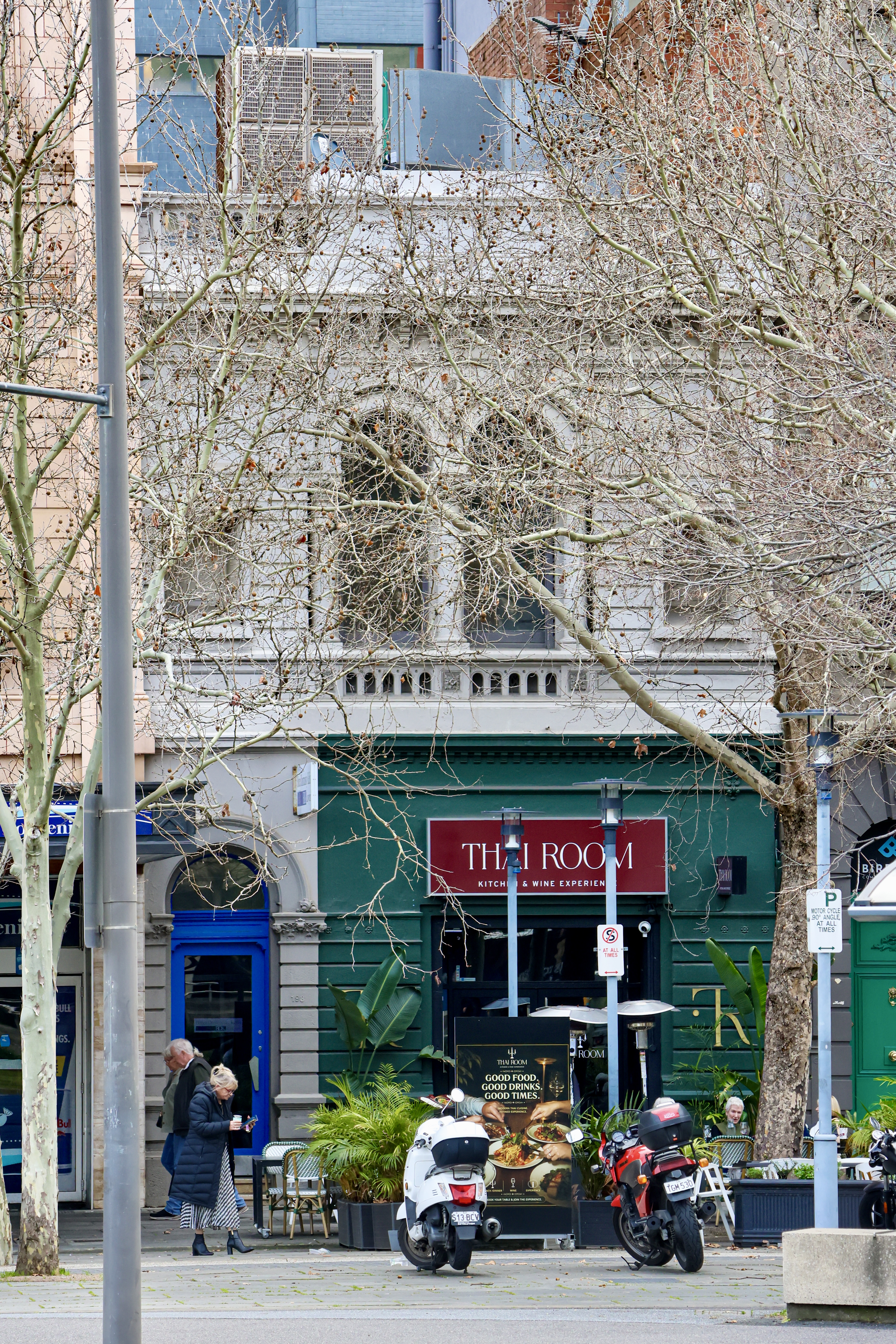
Torrens Chambers on the western side of Victoria Square, 2026.

Layton returned to practice as a barrister, initially at Torrens Chambers before joining Murray Chambers, following administrative changes that centralised decision-making under a new president and reduced the autonomy previously exercised by state deputy presidents under Gerard Brennan and Trevor Davies. She was appointed a part-time commissioner of the Health Insurance Commission for a five-year term commencing on 1 November 1990.

=== Queen's Counsel (1992–2010) ===
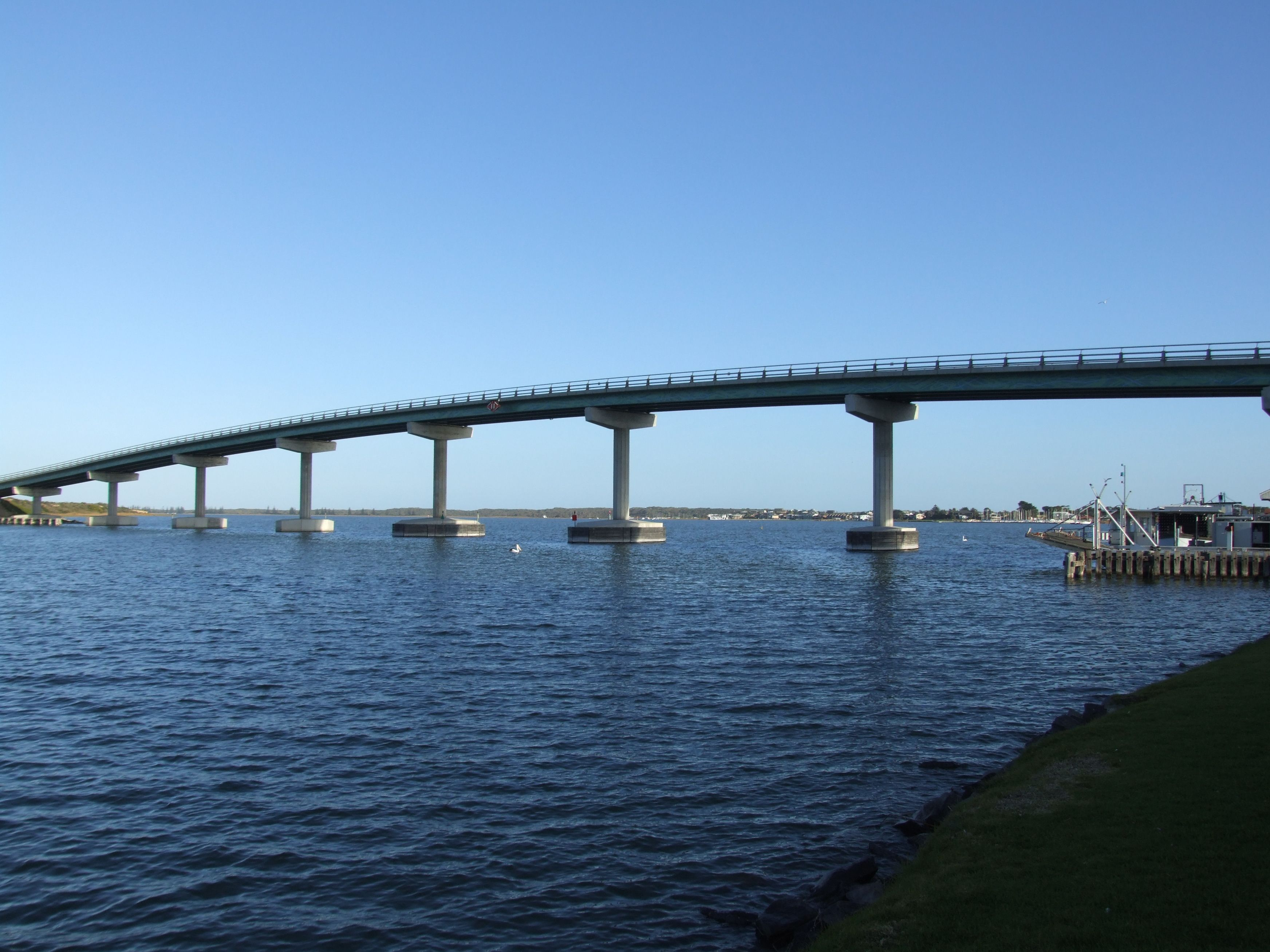
A boat passing beneath the Hindmarsh Island Bridge in February 2013

In 1992, she was appointed Queen's Counsel, becoming the third woman in South Australia to take silk after Mitchell and Frances Nelson. In the same year, she became the first Australian appointed to the International Labour Organization (ILO) Committee of Experts on the Application of Conventions and Recommendations (CEACR), serving from 1993 to 2008 before later becoming the committee's first female chair. During her second period at the Bar, Layton appeared in matters before the Federal Court and the Supreme Court of South Australia, including proceedings arising from the Hindmarsh Island bridge controversy. Acting for the ALRM in 1995, Layton unsuccessfully sought an interim injunction to prevent the commencement of the Hindmarsh Island Royal Commission, arguing that it would unlawfully examine Aboriginal religious beliefs and infringe freedom of religion. After the application was refused, she continued to represent the organisation during the royal commission proceedings, challenging the admission of evidence relating to Aboriginal traditions and confidential women's cultural knowledge before withdrawing the organisation from the inquiry.

In 1997, Layton was appointed to a three-member ILO Commission of Inquiry into Myanmar's compliance with the Forced Labour Convention, alongside Sir William Randolph Douglas and P. N. Bhagwati. Between 2002 and 2003, she conducted the South Australian Government's Child Protection Review, examining child protection policy and practice across government agencies. As a result of this report, reforms were suggested, such as the introduction of a paedophile register and financial investment in the protection of children. In June 2004, Premier Jay Weatherill announced that the report had provided a structure for rebuilding child protection within South Australia.

Since 2000, Layton has worked as a consultant for the ILO, delivering training to judges and legal practitioners on labour law and human rights standards, particularly in Asia, including Bangladesh, India, Indonesia, Malaysia, the Philippines and Thailand. In 2002, she was appointed by the Rann government to conduct a comprehensive review of the state's child protection system. The resulting report, commonly known as the Layton Report, was released in March 2003 and contained around 190–206 recommendations. The report suggested an increase in funding, better coordination among agencies, the creation of legislation for protecting children from abuse and a child sex offender register because of the findings that showed that the resources for dealing with child abuse was inadequate. The report served as a basis for future changes in child protection. In 2004, she joined the Flinders University Legal Practitioners Research Programme as a visiting scholar, and from 2005 she served as chair of the Australian Centre for Protection's Advisory Committee at the University of South Australia (UniSA).

In 2005, Layton was appointed a judge of the Supreme Court of South Australia, becoming the fourth woman to serve on the court, and in 2006 she sat with Judith Nyland and Ann Vanstone on a three-member bench of the Court of Appeal, one of the first all-female appellate benches in Australia. As a Supreme Court judge, she presided over both civil and criminal matters and noted the increasing procedural complexity of criminal jury trials compared with her earlier experience at the Bar.

== Retirement and later life ==
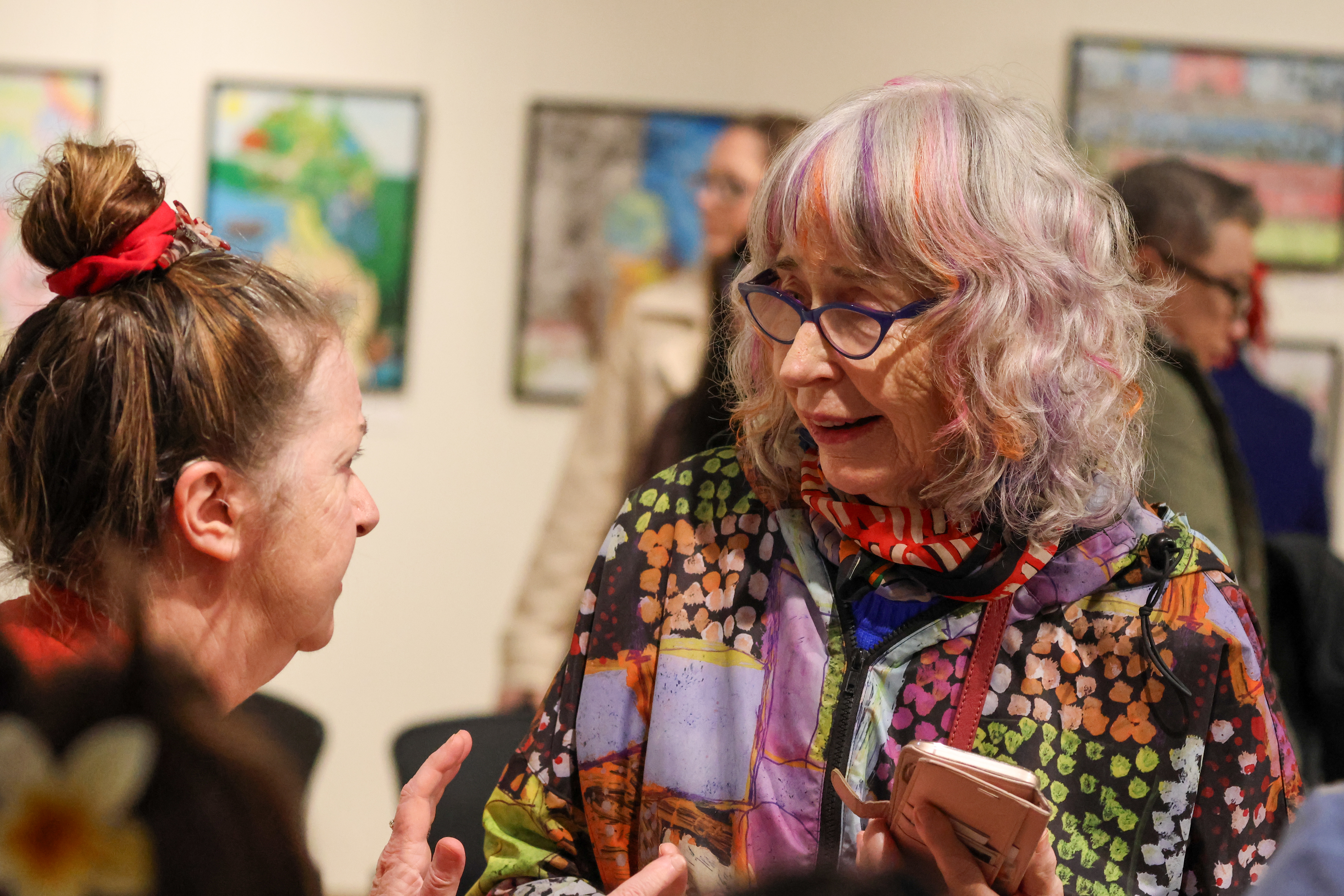
Layton (right), patron of the AMRC, with Elizabeth Ho (left), deputy chairperson, at the launch of the 2026 SA Refugee Week Youth Poster Awards Exhibition

In 2010, after 16 years as a judge, Layton resigned from the South Australian Supreme Court to focus on international judicial education and human rights. She continued as chair of the ILO CEACR and worked as a consultant and judicial education practitioner in various countries. From 2010, she was appointed an adjunct professor at UniSA, where she continued her association with the School of Law, and worked independently as a judicial education and programme development consultant.

Following her retirement from the bench, Layton undertook consultancy work with the Asian Development Bank on gender and development projects, including poverty reduction initiatives for women in the Philippines, Kazakhstan and Cambodia between 2011 and 2013, legal frameworks addressing climate change and disaster resilience in Fiji, Laos and Mongolia from 2018, and legal literacy and gender-based violence programs in Afghanistan and Pakistan from 2017. She also maintained involvement in South Australian legal and community organisations, serving on the council and committees of the Law Society of South Australia. She served as co-chair of Reconciliation SA alongside Peter Buckskin and worked with Reconciliation Australia on public education initiatives relating to constitutional recognition of Aboriginal and Torres Strait Islander peoples.

In 2013, Layton conducted advocacy workshops for law students at University of Delhi and members of the Delhi Bar. In the same year, she led an independent review panel on the Anangu Pitjantjatjara Yankunytjatjara Land Rights Act (APYLRA) Review, which conducted consultations on the APY Lands through multiple field visits and meetings before submitting its report to the Minister for Aboriginal Affairs and Reconciliation in 2014; several recommendations were later incorporated into legislative amendments introduced in 2016. In 2017, she was involved with Justice Reinvestment South Australia. On 10 March 2019, she concluded her term on the board of the Australian Children's Education and Care Quality Authority. She has also been a patron and ambassador for organisations including the Australian Migrant Resource Centre (AMRC) and has served as Human Rights Ambassador for the United Nations Association of Australia.

== Recognitions and honours ==
In 2011, Layton was made an Honorary Member (life membership) of the Law Society of South Australia. In 2012, she was appointed an Officer of the Order of Australia for distinguished service to the law and the judiciary, particularly through the Supreme Court of South Australia, and for advocacy in relation to Indigenous, refugee and children's rights, and she was also named South Australian of the Year. In 2013, she received an honorary doctorate from UniSA. In 2013, she was a joint recipient of the Law Society of South Australia Justice Award, and in 2016 she received the Australian Women Lawyers Australian Woman Lawyer of the Year Award. In 2017, she was made a life member of the Women Lawyers Association of South Australia (WLASA). In 2018, the WLASA established The Honourable Dr Robyn Layton SO QC Award in her name.

== Personal life ==
Layton married John Bannon, and the couple had a daughter, Victoria, before divorcing in 1978. She later had a second daughter, Anne Sibree, with Chris Sibree. In December 2015, Layton attended Bannon's state funeral at St Peter's Cathedral and later joined members of her immediate family at his private burial in West Terrace Cemetery.

== Selected publications ==
As of 2024, Layton's most recent publications include two articles on equal compensation and the gender pay gap, as well as a 2017 co-authored book on Australian evidence law. Her other publications include:

- Layton, Robyn (28 June 2016). South Australia urged to trial and evaluate Justice Reinvestment pilot projects. Croakey Health Media.
- Layton, Robyn (2017). "Justice Reinvestment program progressing in Port Adelaide" (PDF). Bulletin. 39 (10). Law Society of South Australia: 17. Archived from the original on 6 July 2026.
- Layton, Robyn (2021). "Justice reinvestment: A community driven process to tackle root causes of crime among Aboriginal youth". Bulletin. 43 (10). Law Society of South Australia: 14–16. Archived from the original on 6 July 2026.
- Layton, Robyn (2022). "Urgent investment needed for important justice reinvestment initiative". Bulletin. 44 (6). Law Society of South Australia: 31. Archived from the original on 6 July 2026.
