= Musgrave Ranges =

Mountain range in South Australia, Western Australia and the Northern Territory

- Location within South Australia

Highest point
- Peak: Ngarutjaranya
- Elevation: 1,435 m (4,708 ft)

Dimensions
- Length: 210 km (130 mi) east/west

Geography
- Country: Australia
- States: South Australia, Northern Territory and Western Australia
- Range coordinates: 26°19′13″S 131°44′38″E

Musgrave Ranges is a mountain range in Central Australia, straddling the boundary of South Australia (Anangu Pitjantjatjara Yankunytjatjara) and the Northern Territory (MacDonnell Shire), extending into Western Australia. It is between the Great Victoria Desert to the south and the Gibson Desert to the north. They have a length of 210 kilometres (130 mi) and many peaks that have a height of more than 1,100 metres (3,600 ft), the highest being Ngarutjaranya at 1,435 metres (4,708 ft).

== Inhabitants ==
They were originally inhabited by the indigenous Yankunytjatjara people. The English explorer William Gosse and his team were the first Europeans to visit the region in the 1870s. Gosse named the mountains after Anthony Musgrave, then Governor of South Australia. At the start of the 20th century, Yankunytjatjara people began migrating east, and groups of Pitjantjatjara moved into the Musgrave region from the west. Today, the majority of the families in the communities of Amata and Kaltjiti identify as Pitjantjatjara.

In a historic decision freehold title to the South Australian portion of the Musgrave Ranges was granted to the Pitjantjatjara people by virtue of the Anangu Pitjantjatjara Yankunytjatjara Land Rights Act 1981.

== Mineral exploration ==
In order to combat unemployment, the Pitjantjatjara Elders seek to develop employment and opportunity within the Pitjantjatjara Lands. Mineral exploration companies in particular have been keen to discuss possible business alliances with the Pitjantjatjara people because in addition to being a highly prospective region (platinum group elements, gold, uranium, copper, silver, possibly oil), the region represents the largest freehold Aboriginal province in Australia and has had no modern mineral exploration techniques applied since the Land Rights Act of 1981.

== See also ==
- Olia Chain
- Petermann Ranges
