= Murputja, South Australia =

Murputja South Australia
- Coordinates: 26°09′35″S 130°11′02″E
- Population: 53 (2016 census)
- Postcode(s): 0872
- Time zone: ACST (UTC+9:30)
- LGA(s): Anangu Pitjantjatjara Yankunytjatjara
- Region: Far North
- State electorate(s): Giles
- Federal division(s): Grey
- Footnotes: coordinates

Murputja is an Aboriginal community in the Anangu Pitjantjatjara Yankunytjatjara in South Australia.

In 2007, four South Australia Police officers were based at Murputja and running patrols in the area. There was a rudimentary shed structure that served as a police station when police were present and some new housing had been built for police officers. As of 2018, the APY Lands were served by stations situated at Amata, Ernabella, Mimili, Murputja, Umuwa and the town of Marla. Specialist policing support is located at Umuwa, including CIB and domestic violence investigators.

== Time zone ==
Due to its links with the Northern Territory and proximity to the border, the APY Lands do not observe daylight savings unlike the rest of South Australia. The time zone observed throughout the year is Australian Central Standard Time (UTC+9:30), in line with Darwin rather than Adelaide.

== See also ==
- Murputja Anangu School
