= Indulkana Range =

Mountain range in South Australia

Coordinates: 27°00′38″S 133°16′35″E

Location in South Australia

The Indulkana Range is a range of hills in the northwest of South Australia. It is sometimes called the Mount Chandler Range after its highest peak. It is located to the southwest of Indulkana, on the Aṉangu Pitjantjatjara Yankunytjatjara lands. The mountains of the Indulkana area are part of the traditional country of the Yankunytjatjara and Antakarinya.

The range consists of a series of parallel ridges running east to west. The southern side of the range ends in an escarpment, the most prominent point of which is Chambers Bluff. The rock is primarily composed of quartzite and sandstone, resting on slate beds of kaolinised clay. At the eastern end of the range is Mount Chandler, which overlooks the settlement of Indulkana and the Indulkana Creek, and rises about 140 m (460 ft) from its base. It is composed of quartzite and sandstone. Slightly north of the escarpment, and following its path from east to west, is a series of gorges that split the hills and contain several reliable springs.

== Other websites ==
- Geological details from Geoscience Australia:

- Indulkana Shale
- Mount Chandler Sandstone
- Chambers Bluff Tillite
