= Amata Airport =

Amata
- IATA: AMT; ICAO: YAMT

Summary
- Owner: Amata Community Inc.
- Location: Amata, South Australia
- Time zone: ACST (UTC+09:30)
- Elevation AMSL: 2,172 ft / 662 m
- Coordinates: 26°5.8′S 131°12.2′E

Map

Runways
Direction	Length		Surface
Direction	ft	m	Surface
14/32

Amata Airport is a sealed airstrip servicing the town of Amata in the APY Lands of northern South Australia.

Amata is one of three sealed and six unsealed airstrips in the APY Lands. It has lights to enable night operations. It was upgraded in 2016 with camel-proof fencing.

== See also ==
- List of airports in South Australia
