= Welbourne Hill Station =

Pastoral lease in South Australia

Coordinates: 27°23′50″S 133°54′46″E

Location in South Australia

Welbourne Hill Station is a pastoral lease in the Australian state of South Australia which operates as a cattle station. It covers an area of 3,395 square kilometres (1,311 sq mi) in the north-west of the state. The town of Marla is located within its western end. In April 2013, the land occupying the appropriate extent of the Welbourne Hill pastoral lease was gazetted by the Government of South Australia as a locality under the name Welbourne Hill.

== See also ==
- List of ranches and stations
- Robin Kankapankatja
- Marla Airport
