= Kaltjiti =

Kaltjiti (Fregon)
- Town
- Coordinates: 26°45′54″S 131°2′0″E
- Country: Australia
- State: South Australia
- LGA: Anangu Pitjantjatjara Yankunytjatjara
- Established: c. 1934

Government
  - State electorate: Giles
  - Federal division: Grey
- Elevation: 524 m (1,719 ft)

Population
  - Total: 220 (2016 census)
- Postcode: 0872
- Mean max temp: 28.7 °C (83.7 °F)
- Mean min temp: 13.6 °C (56.5 °F)
- Annual rainfall: 222.6 mm (8.76 in)

Kaltjiti (formerly Fregon) is an Aboriginal community in Anangu Pitjantjatjara Yankunytjatjara (APY lands) in South Australia, comprising one of the six main communities on "The Lands" (the others being Amata, Pukatja, Pipalyatjara, Indulkana and Mimili).

== Time zone ==
Due to its links with the Northern Territory and proximity to the border, the APY Lands do not observe daylight savings unlike the rest of South Australia. The time zone observed throughout the year is Australian Central Standard Time (UTC+9:30), in line with Darwin rather than Adelaide.

== Geography ==
Kaltjiti (26.765°S 132.0333°E) is situated approximately 45 kilometres (28 mi) south of the Musgrave Ranges and lies west of the Everard Ranges. Kaltjiti is also situated approximately 137 kilometres (85 mi) from the Stuart Highway. Kaltjiti lies directly south of Umuwa and Ernabella/Pukatja. The community straddles the Officer Creek, which in turn flows from South Australia's highest mountain, Ngarutjaranya. The creek is usually a dry sandy bed and only flows at times of very high rainfall.

== Climate ==
Based on the climate records from Marla, Kaltjiti experiences summer maximum temperatures of an average of 37.1 °C (98.8 °F) in January and a winter maximum average temperature of 19.7 °C (67.5 °F) in June. Overnight lows range from a mean minimum temperature of 21.8 °C (71.2 °F) in January to 5.0 °C (41.0 °F) in June.

Annual rainfall averages 222.6 millimetres (8.76 in).

== Demographics ==
In the 2016 Australian census, Kaltjiti's population was 220 people.

=== History ===
In 1986 the population was recorded as 268; in 1991, it was 310 and in 1996 it was 299, according to the Australian Bureau of Statistics' 1999 Yearbook.

In the 2001 Australian Census, the population was 245.

In 2006 and 2011, only the total count of Aboriginal and Torres Strait Islander people for "Kaltjiti (Fregon) and Inintata Homelands" area is available, with a total of 212 in 2006 and 242 in 2011.

== History ==
=== 19th century ===
The first recording by non-Indigenous Australians of a community at Kaltjiti was by explorer Ernest Giles. In September 1873 during his second trip into the South Australian interior, he and another party member, William Tietkens, encountered 200 male Aboriginal men. The Europeans fired shots, allegedly in retaliation for the throwing of spears. The Europeans escaped unharmed; there is no mention of Aboriginal casualties. Giles later acknowledged that Aboriginal aggression was usually due to white trespass on black land. Giles named the river where this occurred "The Officer", by which it was known until the 1930s when it was renamed Officer Creek.

=== 20th century ===
Harold Brown established the first European settlement in 1934 when he was granted the water permit for the Shirley Well block, 60 kilometres south of Ernabella. The well on the north side of the Officer creek was dug near the existing bore and the Browns built their house on the south side.

Brown and his colleague Allan Brumby had been encouraged by R. M. Williams' stories of successfully hunting dingoes to facilitate a cull encouraged by Government bounties for dingo scalps to take up "dogging" themselves. In about 1929 they headed west on a dogging and prospecting trip that took them through the Musgrave and Mann Ranges and as far as Uluru. They climbed the rock and left a message in a bottle for the next visitors. By the early 1930s Brown had established a base-camp in the Petermann Ranges and was dogging as far west as the Rawlinson and Warburton Ranges. Brown sank a successful well near Officer Creek, south of the Musgrave Ranges, and claimed the government reward. He constructed a mud hut and a dug-out dwelling at Shirley Well and ran some sheep, but continued to make long dogging trips westwards. Brown had an Aboriginal wife and several children, but in 1934 he married a white woman in Alice Springs. He abandoned his Aboriginal wife and their children, and his new wife joined him at Shirley Well.

The South Australian Government resumed Brown's lease in 1939, and Ernabella (now Pukatja) gained grazing rights there. After the abortive attempt in 1957 to jointly establish outstations west of Ernabella, it was decided in 1960 to establish an outstation on the Shirley Well block under the umbrella of Ernabella. Aboriginal people were camped at Shirley Well permanently, which made it easy to expand the sheep industry to include this area.

Fregon was built with government assistance in 1961 as a base for cattlemen and their families. According to tradition, the community took the name "Fregon" at that time in honour of a Mr Fregon of Victoria who donated £5-10,000 to help missionaries establish a bore at the site. A site was chosen 4-5 kilometres south of Shirley Well on the Officer Creek about 60 kilometres south west of Ernabella. The aim of the outstation was to provide training in cattle work and for the families to have access to traditional country in the sandhills to the west. Fregon was administered through Ernabella and it was not until 1968 that it had its own airstrip. It began with a school, a small hospital, a workshop, a small store and staff houses. There were four staff members including a schoolteacher, a nursing sister, an overseer and a cattle manager.

During the late 1970s to early 1980s, Victor Harbor Primary School started a yearly cultural exchange camp for their year 7 students. This camp involved a few days stay in Fregon where students would learn a little bit of local culture and language. This camp still runs as of 2021 and is an important experience for all students involved.

Tuberculosis wiped out the cattle industry and transport business in the 1980s.

The settlement was funded by the federal government as an outstation during the 1980s.

=== 21st century ===
It was reported in early 2019 that a new water source had been found at a site near Kaljiti in a "palaeo-valley", where groundwater is held about 90 metres below the surface (existing sources being about 30m down). Core drill samples have been dated at 5–10 million years old. Pipes were temporarily capped, but elder Witjiti George said that he hoped the water could be used to support a cattle herd, helping to create jobs and an ongoing industry for isolated communities. The new source could also provide much needed drinking water. APY Lands general manager Richard King said the origin of the water was yet to be established, but the water is pure, with low salinity. Government experts were working with Flinders University and the CSIRO to learn more about the source.

== Facilities ==
Kaltjiti does not have a permanent police presence. South Australia Police are based at Mimili and run patrols in the area. As of October 2018 there a rudimentary shed structure that serves as a police station when police are present. As of 2020 a new, permanent policing complex was being built at Umuwa to accommodate officers with specialist response capabilities, and to provide a base for a mobile unit which would be deployed in Kaltjiti, Indulkana, and Pipalyatjara. The service would work closely with child protection agencies. The 2019–2020 Government of South Australia agency budget estimated the completion date as June 2021, with a total spend of A$4.28 million.

Kaltjiti has a sealed airstrip.

Electrical power to the community is supplied from the central powerhouse at Umuwa, while water is provided from six bores—a portion of which is desalinated—and placed in storage tanks for pumping to the community. The desalinated water is supplied to the clinic, hot water services and dedicated drinking water taps in private houses and the store, while untreated water is supplied for other uses in dwellings and around the community. All water supplied to the community is disinfected using UV sterilisation. The desalination plant was commissioned in 2005 by SA Water and has a total capacity of 160 kilolitres (5,700 cu ft) per day.

Kaltjiti has the Fregon Anangu School. Technical and further education (TAFE) opportunities are provided to the community.

There is a health clinic run by Nganampa Health Council with a doctor who visits both Fregon and Pukatja communities, and a general store supplied weekly via road train and forming the main supply for the APY lands.

A permit is required for a member of the public to visit any community on the APY Lands, as they are freehold lands owned by the Aboriginal people.

== Recreation ==
Kaltjiti has an Australian Rules Football field and a basketball court with night lights. The Fregon Football Club players are known as the Fregon Bulldogs.

As with most APY settlements, Australian Broadcasting Corporation and Special Broadcasting Service television are available.

== Art centre ==
The community runs Kaltjiti Arts. It is one of ten Indigenous-owned and -governed art centres that go to make up the APY Art Centre Collective, established in 2013.

== Sources ==
- "1999 ABS Yearbook;" (PDF). Australian Bureau of Statistics.
- "2016 Census QuickStats: Kaltjiti (Fregon) (L)". Australian Bureau of Statistics. Archived from the original on 26 July 2020.
- "Commonwealth Bureau of Meteorology data". Bureau of Meteorology.
- "Enhanced police service delivery on APY Lands" (Press release). Australian Government. Dept of Prime Minister and Cabinet. 18 October 2018. Archived from the original on 7 July 2019.
- Gara, Tom. "History Trust of South Australia" (Conference Paper). Government of South Australia.
- Henson, Elizabeth (17 October 2018). "New police complex at Umuwa and mobile pop-up station in $4.28 million APY Lands project". The Advertiser.
- "Kaltjiti Arts".
- Martin, Patrick; Puddy, Rebecca (25 May 2019). "Water discovery in ancient underground valley boosts hopes of development in APY Lands". Australia: ABC News.
- "SA Police Association Newsletter" (PDF). Archived from the original (PDF) on 7 February 2012.
- "SAWater – Desalination across the state". SA Water. 28 January 2020. Archived from the original on 28 January 2020.
- "South Australian Department of Primary Industry and Resources" (PDF). Government of South Australia. p. i.
- State Budget 2019–20: Agency Statement: Budget Paper 4 (PDF) (Report). Vol. 3. Government of South Australia. Dept of Treasury and Finance. 18 June 2019. ISSN 1440-8589.
- "UCA List of Congregations". Archived from the original on 30 August 2007.
