= Sportsworld =

Sportsworld may refer to:

- Sportsworld (Australian TV series), an Australian sports information program, 1990–2006
- Sportsworld (radio programme), the flagship sports programme of BBC World Service, 1959–present
- Sportsworld (Canada), a news show on sports channel The Score
- Sportsworld (American TV series), an American sports anthology series, 1978–1992
- Sportsworld (magazine), an Indian sports magazine

== See also ==
- Sports World or Sports Direct, a British sporting goods retailer
- World of Sport (disambiguation)
