= Wide World of Sports =

Wide World of Sports can refer to:

- Wide World of Sports (Australian TV program), screened on the Nine Network
- Wide World of Sports (American TV program), broadcast by the American Broadcasting Company
- Wide World of Sports (Canadian TV program), broadcast by CTV
- Nine's Wide World of Sports, sports coverage on Australia's Nine Network
- ESPN Wide World of Sports Complex, an athletic complex located in Lake Buena Vista, Florida, formerly known as Disney's Wide World of Sports.
- Disney's Wide World of Sports Spirit Award.

== See also ==
- World of Sport (disambiguation)
