= Yunyarinyi =

Yunyarinyi South Australia
- Coordinates: 26°32′26″S 132°44′36″E
- Population: 50 (estimate)
- Postcode(s): 5710
- Elevation: 621.2 m (2,038 ft)
- LGA(s): Anangu Pitjantjatjara Yankunytjatjara
- State electorate(s): Giles
- Federal division(s): Grey

Yunyarinyi is an Aboriginal homeland on the Aṉangu Pitjantjatjara Yankunytjatjara Lands in South Australia. It is located about 45 kilometres (28 mi) south of the border with the Northern Territory, 320 km (200 mi) south of Alice Springs.

Yunyarinyi started as a cattle station called Kenmore Park. It officially became an Indigenous community when the land rights were granted in 1981 by the Anangu Pitjantjatjara Yankunytjatjara Land Rights Act 1981.

== Time zone ==
Due to its links with the Northern Territory and proximity to the border, the APY Lands do not observe daylight savings unlike the rest of South Australia. The time zone observed throughout the year is Australian Central Standard Time (UTC+9:30), in line with Darwin rather than Adelaide.

== Location and population ==
Yunyarinyi is located in South Australia about 45 kilometres (28 mi) south of the Northern Territory border. It lies about 320 kilometres (200 mi) directly south of Alice Springs (longer by road), and about 40 kilometres (25 mi) from the larger community of Pukatja. The population fluctuates around 50 people, with many children among them. Residents travel to use the shop and services at Pukatja.

== Facilities ==
Kenmore Park Anangu School caters for children from birth to Year 12.

There is a community centre with a shared kitchen, a community office, a local garage (repair shop), and community garden patch.
