= World of Sport =

World of Sport can refer to:

- World of Sport (Australian TV program) seen on Melbourne's HSV Channel 7
- World of Sport (Sydney, Australia TV series) seen on Sydney's TCN Channel 9
- World of Sport (UK TV programme), a 1965–1985 British television sport programme broadcast nationwide on ITV
  - Johnny Vaughan's World of Sport - a short lived revival of the ITV programme on digital channel BBC Three, hosted by Johnny Vaughan.
  - World of Sport Wrestling, promoted as a 2018 reboot of the wrestling segment of the original UK television series, a UK wrestling promotion and television series broadcast on ITV
  - "World of Sport" style - a retronym for the "Traditional"/"Old School" style of Professional wrestling in the United Kingdom, derived from digital TV repeats of the original segment.
- Trevor's World of Sport sitcom on BBC
- World of Sports (American radio program), the ABC radio network counterpart of the television ABC's Wide World of Sports

== See also ==
- Wide World of Sports (disambiguation)
- Sportsworld (disambiguation)
