= Granite Downs =

Former pastoral lease in South Australia

Coordinates: 27°01′01″S 133°31′15″E

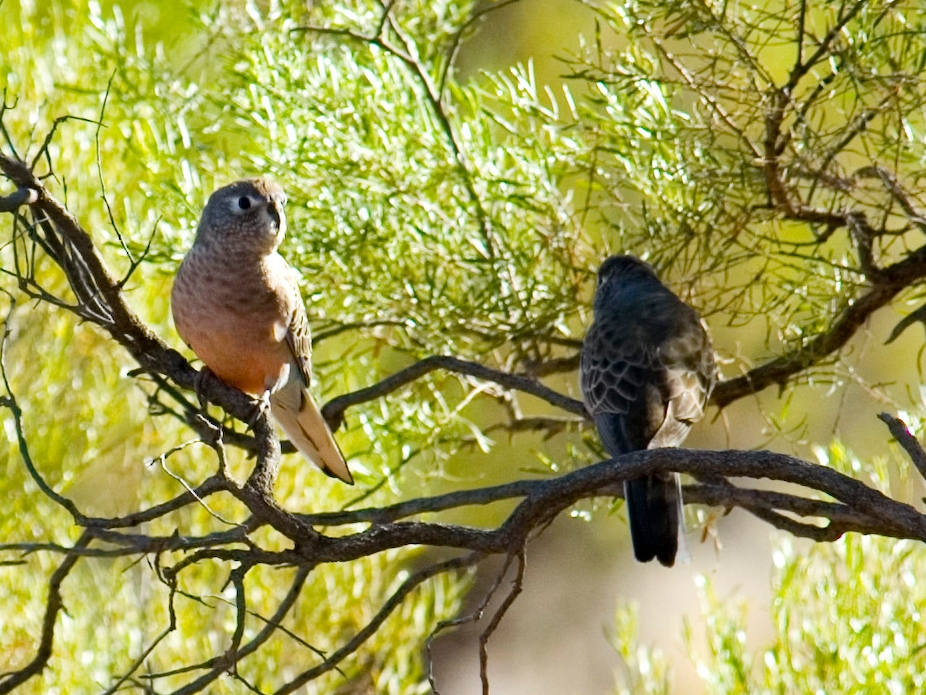
The IBA is an important site for Bourke's parrots

Granite Downs was a 9,000-square-kilometre (3,475 sq mi) cattle station in arid northern South Australia.

It is now part of the Anangu Pitjantjatjara Yankunytjatjara lands.

== Birds ==
A 552-square-kilometre (213 sq mi) part of Granite Downs has been identified by BirdLife International as an Important Bird Area (IBA) because it supports a population of the near threatened chestnut-breasted whiteface at its north-western distribution limit. It also supports populations of the inland dotterel, Bourke's parrot, banded whiteface, black honeyeater, pied honeyeater, cinnamon quail-thrush, chiming wedgebill and thick-billed grasswren.
