= Indulkana =

Indulkana (Iwantja)
- Town
- Coordinates: 26°58′04″S 133°18′27″E
- Country: Australia
- State: South Australia
- Region: Far North
- LGA: Anangu Pitjantjatjara Yankunytjatjara
- Location: 1,016 km (631 mi) north-west of Adelaide

Government
  - State electorate: Giles
  - Federal division: Grey
- Elevation: 396 m (1,299 ft)

Population
  - Total: 338 (2021 census)
- Time zone: UTC+9:30 (ACST)
- Postcode: 0872
- Mean max temp: 28.7 °C (83.7 °F)
- Mean min temp: 13.6 °C (56.5 °F)
- Annual rainfall: 234.4 mm (9.23 in)

Indulkana (also known as Iwantja, from Iwantja Creek) is an Aboriginal community in the Anangu Pitjantjatjara Yankunytjatjara Lands in South Australia, comprising one of the six main communities on "The Lands" (the others being Pukatja, Amata, Kaltjiti, Mimili and Pipalyatjara). At the 2016 Australian census, Indulkana had a population of 256.

== Time zone ==
Due to its links with the Northern Territory and proximity to the border, the APY Lands do not observe daylight savings unlike the rest of South Australia. The time zone observed throughout the year is Australian Central Standard Time (UTC+9:30), in line with Darwin rather than Adelaide.

== Geography ==
Indulkana (Iwantja) is situated about 10 kilometres (6.2 mi) west of the Stuart Highway and 360 kilometres (220 mi) south of Alice Springs. By road it is 1,134 kilometres (705 mi) (approx.11.5 hours) north-west of Adelaide GPO.

== Climate ==
Based upon the climate records of the nearest weather station at Marla Police Station, Indulkana experiences summer maximum temperatures of an average of 37.1 degrees Celsius in January and a winter maximum average temperature of 19.7 degrees Celsius in June. Overnight lows range from a mean minimum temperature of 21.8 degrees in January to 5.0 degrees in June.

Annual rainfall averages 222.6 millimetres.

== Demographics ==
Pitjantjatjara Yankunytjatjara Media (PY Media) states on its website:

Indulkana is an Anangu community, often referred to as Iwantja, on the Anangu Pitjantjatjara Yankunytjatjara Lands in the northwest of South Australia. Although Indulkana is regarded as an Pitjantjatjara community, the majority of people at Indulkana refer to themselves as Yankunytjatjara, which is a group having its origins in the eastern section of the Lands.

The community consists of approximately 200-250 people with a small number of people occupying outlying homelands.

As of the 2021 Australian census, 338 people resided in Indulkana (Iwantja), up from 256 in the 2016 census. The median age of persons in Indulkana was 26 years. There were fewer males than females, with 46.4% of the population male and 53.6% female. The average household size was 4.6 people per household.

In the 2016 Australian census:

- The town's population was 256, with a median age of 27.
- Only 74.4% reported being of Aboriginal ancestry (lower than other APY communities), with 95.5% born in Australia.
- Languages spoken at home were Pitjantjatjara 41.4%; Yankunytjatjara 22.1%; and Arrernte language 1.2%. 19.7% of people only spoke English at home.
- 43.6% of households had at least one person access the internet from the dwelling.

With 41.4% of the community characterised as Professionals and 29.3% as Community and Personal Service Workers 29.3%, the skilled categories were higher than the average across the APY lands (33.4% and 25.9% respectively), although managers numbered fewer.

=== History ===
- In 2001 the population was 225 (no median age cited). 84.4% spoke Pitjantjatjara at home, and 2.2% Yankunytjatjara 2.2%. 8.4% spoke only English at home.
- In 2006, the population was 315, with a median age of 22. 63.8% Yankunytjatjara; 16.5% Pitjantjatjara; 1.3% Ngaanyatjarra; 17.8% English only at home.
- In 2011 the population was 310, with a median age of 26. 60.1% spoke Pitjantjatjara and 26.6% Yankunytjatjara; 1.3% Arrernte; 9.1% spoke only English at home.

== History ==
Little is recorded of the history of Indulkana's foundation as a fixed settlement for habitation. There is likely more history of the Iwantja homelands surrounding the settlement.

Indulkana has been recorded as the birthplace of 1984 Australian of the Year and Indigenous advocate Lowitja O'Donoghue, by some sources, but her exact birthplace was never registered and her official biographer records De Rose Hill as her place of birth.

In the late 1990s, the Indulkana community invited the Aboriginal Drug and Alcohol Council (SA) to run a program to address the problem of petrol sniffing in their community.

== Facilities ==
Indulkana does not have a permanent police presence, though it has a police station. South Australia Police are based at Marla and service the area. There is a police station at Umuwa, though it has not been permanently staffed. As of 2020 a new, permanent policing complex is being built at Umawa. It will accommodate officers with specialist response capabilities, as well provide a base for a mobile unit which will be deployed in Fregon/Kaltjiti, Indulkana and Pipalyatjara. The service will work closely with child protection service agencies address child abuse and family violence issues. The 2019–2020 Government of South Australia agency budget estimates the completion date as June 2021, with a total spend of A$4.28 million.

Indulkana has a local community store with a fuel supply outlet.

There is an unsealed airstrip located close to the town.

A doctor lives in the community and services the health clinics at both Indulkana and Mimili Community to the west.

Indulkana is one of the two communities on the APY Lands that provides an aged care facility for elders, the other being Ernabella.

The University of South Australia runs an AnTEP program out of Indulkana, providing tertiary education in teaching with a view to people from the APY Lands teaching in culturally sensitive way on the Lands.

The Indulkana Anangu School was established after 1971, recounted on the School's website as follows:

Leslie Mingkilli wrote a letter to the South Australian Government on behalf of Indulkana Community asking for funding and help to establish a school. He wrote to the Government in the Pitjantjatjara language, insisting that a school be started at Indulkana. Leslie was educated at Ernabella (Pukatja) community where he learnt to read and write English and Pitjantjatjara. This dream finally came true when Leslie went to Adelaide and returned with David Emery, the first Principal and three teachers. The school began with tents and sheds made of timber and brush from the surrounding bush.

The school is supported by Aboriginal Education Workers and a computer facility with 24-networked computers with Internet access.

As of 2013, Indulkana has a Youth Shed that has been supervised by Uniting Care Wesley Country SA staff since 2011. Youth workers run the facility six days a week during the school holidays but it is closed every Sunday during the school term. 6 public computers with internet access and wi-fi is available at no cost. Public toilets are located on the premises, along with showering facilities which are available on request for visitors. Activities available include pool tables, darts, musical instruments (drums, guitars & percussion), Xbox, wii, reading material & books, colouring activities, painting, craft, jewelry making, music and sports equipment.

Indulkana has a community oval.

A permit from the Anangu Pitjantjatjara Yankunytjatjara is required to access Indulkana, as the land is owned freehold by the resident Aboriginal people.

For State elections (i.e. to elect the Parliament of South Australia), a mobile polling booth is taken to Indulkana.

== Iwantja Arts ==
Iwantja Arts was named after Iwantja Creek, where the community was first established. It was created in a building used as a community centre, later transformed into a craft centre focusing on fabric dyeing, jewellery making, and tjanpi (spinifex grass) weaving. There is a long history of printmaking among local artists, and examples of their work is held in both the South Australian Museum and National Gallery of Australia. It continues as an important art form, and both relief and intaglio forms are used in the studio.

In the early 1980s, artists Alec Baker and Sadie Singer drove to Adelaide and then on to Canberra, to advocate for funding to develop facilities for a contemporary arts centre, including a printmaking workshop and painting studios. It is now a not for profit, Aboriginal-owned and -run corporation, with a gallery for sale of art work from the Lands.

Iwantja Arts is one of ten Indigenous-owned and -governed enterprises that go to make up the APY Art Centre Collective, established in 2013.

One of the original members of Iwantja Arts is Whiskey Tjukangku. His granddaughter, Kaylene Whiskey, is also an artist.

Betty Muffler is another longtime Iwantja Arts artist and ngangkari (healer), whose work was featured in the 2020 Tarnanthi exhibition as well as on the cover of the September 2020 issue of Vogue Australia. She is also a director of the centre.

== See also ==
- Indulkana Range
