= Ted Mullighan =

Australian judge (1939–2011)

Edward Picton "Ted" Mullighan, QC (25 March 1939 – 15 September 2011) was an Australian judge who was known as an Indigenous rights advocate and protecting vulnerable people. He was known for his role as Commissioner of the Government of South Australia' Children in State Care Commission of Inquiry (the Mullighan Inquiry) from 2004 to 2008.

== Early life and education ==
Mullighan was born on 25 March 1939 in a hospital in the seaside suburb of Semaphore in Adelaide, South Australia. Until he got married, he lived on the Lefevre Peninsula, at Semaphore and Largs Bay. His father was an electrician who worked for the Electricity Trust, while his mother became a classical violinist as a teenager, initially playing for the South Australian Symphony Orchestra and then the orchestra run by the Theatre Royal in Hindley Street after having a family and being unable to travel with the larger orchestra.

Mullighan attended Largs Bay Primary School and then, from Grade 7, Pulteney Grammar School on South Terrace, Adelaide, winning a scholarship after around a year. He said that the school did not have a good academic reputation in those days, and he was a poor scholar. He did not complete matriculation, but instead got a job as an office boy in the Crown Solicitor's Office, beginning to study law at the University of Adelaide part-time about a year and a half later. He studied there from 1957 to 1961.

== Career ==
Mullighan practised law from 1962, when he was working for Roma Mitchell and, at the age of 23, became a partner in the firm, purely to be able to appear in the Supreme Court of South Australia, there being no Bar at that point.

He was made Queen's Counsel in 1978, and in 1989 was appointed as a Judge of the Supreme Court.

He was Counsel Assisting in six Royal Commissions, and also acted for the victims of the 1983 Ash Wednesday bushfires in their compensation claims.

He retired in 2004. At the time of his retirement, he said:

I trust that the community will not always want to pursue the relentless goal of increasing punishment as a way of fixing society's current problems. I would very much like to work with offenders and help them realise the effects they have had on victims of their crimes.

== Other roles ==
Mullighan served as president of the Law Society of South Australia for two years between 1978 and 1980, during which time he was concerned with the provision of legal aid in the state, and sitting on the (Commonwealth government) Legal Aid Review Committee set up by Lionel Murphy (1972–1974). He was also inaugural Chair of the Law Societys Advocacy Group from 1993 to 2002'.

From 1993 to 1996 he was a member of the State Courts Administration Council, and in 2005 became Chair of the Forensic Science Advisory Committee.

He mentored young lawyers, and was known for promoting Aboriginal reconciliation, and was co-chair of Reconciliation SA for several years. He promoted cultural awareness in the judicial system, especially with regard to sentencing Aboriginal defendants. He nominated Aboriginal Justices of the Peace, researched traditional Aboriginal ways of dealing with offenders, advocated for court interpreters of Aboriginal languages, and promoted the idea of restorative justice.

From 2002 to 2005 he was Chair of the Centre for Restorative Justice at OARS (Offenders Aid & Rehabilitation Services of SA).

== Commission of Inquiry ==
Although retired, Mullighan accepted the role of Commissioner for the Children in State Care Commission of Inquiry. This was initiated in November 2004 under the terms of the Commission of Inquiry (Children in State Care) Act 2004, amended in 2007 by the Commission of Inquiry (Children in State Care and Children on APY Lands) Act 2004, to include children not in state care, in Anangu Pitjantjatjara Yankunytjatjara (APY lands). and ordered an investigation into allegations of sexual abuse of children under state guardianship, as well as allegations of criminal conduct resulting in the death of children in care. Then Education Minister Jay Weatherill played a key role in establishing inquiry. The Inquiry had cross-partisan support as well as from nearly all of the media.

The final report of the Inquiry (also known as "the Mullighan Report"), published in March 2008, found "that in the past 65 years the State has failed to protect some of the children in its care from sexual abuse", and its record-keeping of the 924 children who had died while in state care was manifestly inadequate. The report included 54 recommendations, intended to improve many aspects of children in care. These included amendments to the Children's Protection Act 1993, various improvements to the practices of Families SA, the creation of a Youth Council to directly advise the Minister for Families and Communities, and many others. As a result of the report, 400 suspected abusers were reported to South Australia Police.

In 2011 it was reported that more than 50 per cent of the victims identified in the Mullighan Inquiry had refused to lodge claims for ex gratia payments, and instead sought private settlements from the government.

Former Premier of South Australia, Mike Rann, said after Mullighan's death that Mullighan had "managed to gain the confidence of a section of the community who had never before been able to speak about their experiences".

== Recognition ==
In June 2010 he was awarded an honorary doctorate by the University of Adelaide "for his distinguished creative contributions in the service of society".

== Death and legacy ==
Mullighan died on 15 September 2011 in Adelaide, aged 72, after a long battle with cancer. His wife, Jan, and five sons survived him. He was given a state funeral, with a service held at St Peter's Cathedral in North Adelaide.

Then Attorney-General of South Australia John Rau said that he had left an "enormous" legacy, including inspiring "countless young lawyers"'and "The community owes him a great debt for his painstaking and thorough work".

== See also ==
- Layton report, a review of child protection laws in 2002
