= Amata, South Australia =

Amata
- Town
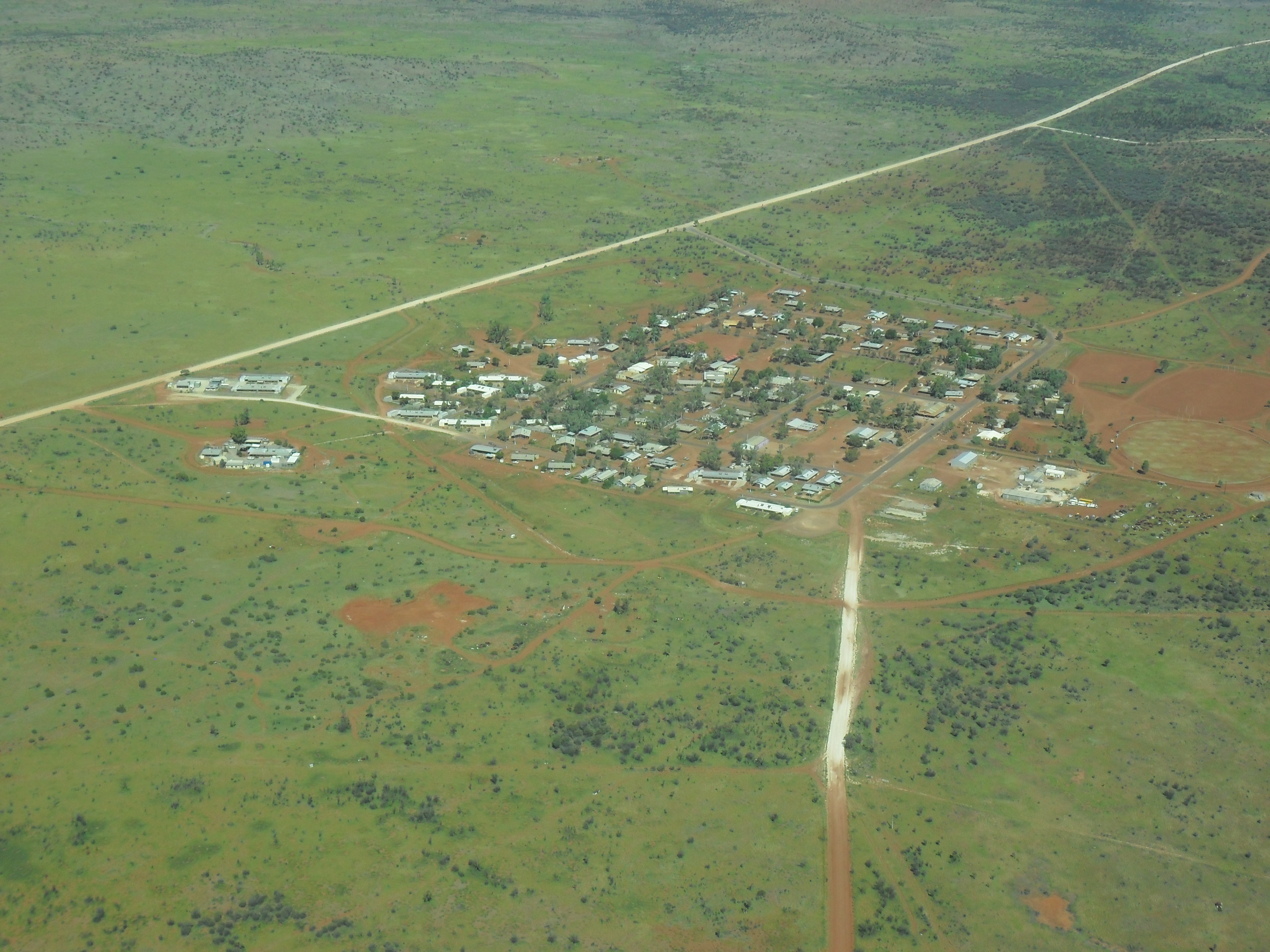

- Coordinates: 26°09′S 131°08′E
- Country: Australia
- State: South Australia
- LGA: Anangu Pitjantjatjara Yankunytjatjara
- Location: 1,407 km (874 mi) North West of Adelaide via
- Established: 1961

Government
  - State electorate: Giles
  - Federal division: Grey
- Elevation: 690 m (2,260 ft)

Population
  - Total: 393 (2021 census)
- Time zone: UTC+09:30 (ACST)
- Postcode: 0872

Amata (formerly Musgrave Park) is an Aboriginal community in the Anangu Pitjantjatjara Yankunytjatjara Lands in South Australia, comprising one of the six main communities on "The Lands" (the others being Pukatja, Kaltjiti, Indulkana, Mimili and Pipalyatjara).

Amata is part of the Amata – Tjurma electorate. The people of the Tjurma Homelands regard themselves as a separate community.

== Time zone ==
Due to its proximity to the border of the Northern Territory, Amata does not observe daylight saving time unlike the rest of South Australia. The time zone observed throughout the year is Australian Central Standard Time (UTC+9:30), in line with Darwin rather than Adelaide.

== Geography and governance ==
Amata lies about 115 kilometres (71 mi) due south of Uluru and 380 kilometres (240 mi) south-west of Alice Springs, in the north-west of South Australia, within the Anangu Pitjantjatjara lands. It is located at the western end of the Musgrave Ranges, about 14 kilometres (8.7 mi) south of the border with the Northern Territory.

Being 700 metres (2,300 ft) above sea level, Amata is also South Australia's highest town.

It lies within one of seven electorates within the APY lands, representing the Amata and Tjurma wider communities, which elect the Executive Board of Anangu Pitjantjatjara Yankunytjatjara. Tjurma appears to be or have been a separate community.

== Climate ==
Based upon the climate records of the nearest weather station at Marla Police Station between 1985 and 2015, Amata experiences summer maximum temperatures of an average of 37.3 °C (99.1 °F) in January and a winter maximum average temperature of 19.6 °C (67.3 °F) in June. Overnight lows range from a mean minimum temperature of 22 °C (72 °F) in January to 5.5 °C (41.9 °F) in June.

Annual mean rainfall is 234.4 millimetres (9.23 in).

== Population ==
Against the trend for Aboriginal communities, the population of Amata grew for some years, from 180 residents in 1981, to more than 350 in the 1990s, to 536 in 1996.

Amata's population was 455 at the 2016 Australian census and 393 at the 2021 Australian census. 93.1% identified as Aboriginal, and 97.5% of the population were born in Australia. 316 (80.4%) spoke the Pitjantjatjara language at home, 10 spoke the Yankunytjatjara dialect, 8 spoke the Warlpiri language and 3 spoke the Eastern Arrernte language. 18.8% of the workforce were unemployed.

The town of Amata services the Tjurma homelands and other nearby lands. The population of the "Amata - Tjurma Homelands" in the 2021 census was 387, 92.6% of whom were Aboriginal: 331 (85.5%) spoke Pitjantjatjara, and 8 (2.1%) Warlpiri. 20.2% of the workforce in the area were unemployed.

== History ==
Amata was established under the name of "Musgrave Park" in 1961 by the South Australian State Government. The community was established to take the pressure off the increasing growth of Pukatja (formerly Ernabella). The aim was to use it to educate the Aboriginal people in how to work in the cattle industry. A school was opened seven years later, in 1968.

The settlement was funded by the federal government as an outstation (homeland) during the 1980s.

== Facilities ==
=== Transport ===
The Centre Bush Bus service offers services between Amata, Kalka and Alice Springs several times a week.

Amata Airport is one of three sealed airstrips in the APY Lands. The other sealed airstrips are located at Kaltjiti and Mimili.

=== Education ===
The Amata Anangu School was upgraded between 2003 and 2005 and there was a commitment in 2007 by state and federal governments to improve the associated swimming pool facility. The swimming pool was opened on 24 June 2007 by then South Australian Premier, Mike Rann. The pool reopened around 2024 after a period of closure, after much needed upgrades, including new rescue and safety equipment as well as new staff.

In 2018, the school offered Reception to Year 12, had a total enrolment of 92 students of which 84% were indigenous and a teaching staff of 15.

Amata has limited Technical and Further Education (TAFE) support. Community lecturers offer training in: preparing for work; literacy and numeracy; work skills; learner driver education and licence support.

=== Food and supplies ===
Obtaining fresh and healthy food has long been a problem for this and other remote communities. In early April 2020, the 1,000-square-metre (11,000 sq ft) Amata Aṉangu Store, opens next to the demolished old general store. With 600 square metres (6,500 sq ft) of storage space and 400 square metres (4,300 sq ft) of shopping area, it will stock "fresh fruit and vegetables, refrigerated frozen meat and other household goods... [from] TV sets to trampolines". The nonprofit organization Mai Wiru Regional Stores Council Aboriginal Corporation was founded in 2000, to help establish food security on the APY Lands, with a major aim being to supply healthy food at cheaper prices in order to improve nutrition and community health. In 2015 Mai Wiru established their own transport system, and supply fresh food from Adelaide rather than Alice Springs, cutting costs by up to 25%.

=== Visitors ===
A permit from the Anangu Pitjantjatjara Yankunytjatjara is required to access Amata, as the land is owned freehold by the corporation of resident Aboriginal people.

== Arts ==
The sale of local artwork plays a large role in the success of the Amata community. Tjala Arts, founded in 1999, exhibited the works of 7 Amata artists in Canberra in 2006. In the 2007 State Budget, the South Australian Government announced $350,000 for a new arts centre in Amata.

Tjala has nourished the careers of many artists who have gone on to be recognised for their work by prestigious art prizes, such as Tjungkara Ken. The Kulata Tjuta (many spears) project has spread across the APY lands as well as featuring in a large installation in the Tarnanthi Festival of Contemporary Aboriginal and Torres Strait Islander Art in Adelaide in 2017. Works by Tjala artists have been bought by private collectors and public institutions across the world, and are on display in the National Gallery of Australia, the Art Gallery of New South Wales, the National Gallery of Victoria and the Art Gallery of South Australia.

Tjala Arts is one of ten Indigenous-owned and -governed enterprises that go to make up the APY Art Centre Collective.
