= Wide Open Space (festival) =

Australian music, arts and culture festival

Wide Open Space (WOS) is a music, arts and culture festival in Central Australia, in the Northern Territory. It has taken place annually from 2009 to 2018, and then in 2021. It features well-known national acts as well as emerging artists from the region, It takes place over three days at the Ross River Resort in the McDonnell Ranges, around 80 km (50 mi) east of Alice Springs. Around 1500 people attend the festival each time.

The festival is known for its unusual programming, such as pairing a local choir, Alice Sings, with the famous Australian rock band Regurgitator to perform their song "Song Formally Known As" in 2018, while in 2017 jazz/funk band Hiatus Kaiyote invited Kardajala Kirri-darra (Sandhill Women) to sing with them.

Vice suggested in 2015 that WOS was perhaps "Australia’s best-kept festival secret", calling the location "breathtaking" and the festival an "honest, real and bullshit-free Central Desert experience".

Its artistic director Scott Large sees the festival as a "community-generated event that wanted to promote and foster local talent" which helps keep Indigenous languages alive.
