= Anangu Pitjantjatjara Yankunytjatjara Land Rights Act 1981 =

South Australian law giving certain land rights to two Aboriginal peoples; created APY

Anangu Pitjantjatjara Yankuntjatjara Land Rights Act 1981
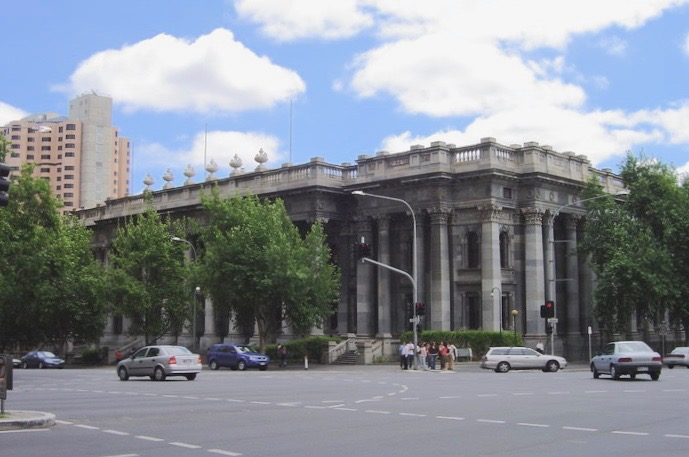

Parliament of South Australia
- Long title: An Act to provide for the vesting of title to certain lands in the people known as Anangu Pitjantjatjara Yankunytjatjara; and for other purposes
- Enacted by: Parliament of South Australia
- Signed: 19 March 1981

Related legislation
- Mining Act 1971, Petroleum Act 1949

The Anangu Pitjantjatjara Yankunytjatjara Land Rights Act 1981 (APYLRA or APY Land Rights Act) grants certain land and other rights to the Anangu Pitjantjatjara Yankunytjatjara (the Pitjantjatjara and Yankunytjatjara people) in South Australia. It began its life as the Pitjantjatjara Land Rights Act and commenced operation on 2 October 1981. Its long name title is "An Act to provide for the vesting of title to certain lands in the people known as Anangu Pitjantjatjara Yankunytjatjara; and for other purposes". The Act has since had several amendments, the latest in 2017.

== History ==
In 1976, the Pitjantjatjara Council was formed to lobby for freehold title to their reserve land, which, since the Aboriginal Lands Trust Act 1966 had been vested in the Minister for Community Welfare. Premier Don Dunstan established a Parliamentary Committee to investigate the feasibility of a separate lands trust to cover the North-West Reserve. The Council wanted title to be vested in a new entity of which all Pitjantjatjara people would be members. They wanted something more than the communal title arrangements which had been granted by the Fraser government under the Aboriginal Land Rights Act 1976 (NT).

Negotiations became drawn out, with the change of government from the Dunstan government to the Liberal government under David Tonkin after the 1979 state election. After the government proposed major changes to the legislation, over 100 Pitjantjatjara people camped at Victoria Park Racecourse in February 1980 in protest. In October 1980, the Tonkin government introduced an amended bill after a long period of negotiations, in which Premier Tonkin took a leading and personal role.

The new bill finally passed through both Houses in March 1981, as the Pitjantjatjara Land Rights Act 1981 (SA), later renamed as the Anangu Pitjantjatjara Yankunytjatjarra Land Rights Act 1981 (SA) (APYLRA). Symbolically, the Act came into force on 2 October 1981, the first anniversary of the date when Premier David Tonkin and the Chairman of the Pitjantjatjara Council, Kawaki Thompson, signed their agreement to the Pitjantjatjara Land Rights Bill. The new law was enacted to acknowledge Anangu ownership of the land; to establish the Anangu Pitjantjatjara Yankunytjatjara Land Management (APY) as a body corporate; and to "provide for efficient and accountable administration and management of lands by Anangu Pitjantjatjara Yankunytjatjarra". However it did not give the people the power of veto over mining activities; any disputes would need to be resolved by an independent arbitrator.

== Significance ==
The Act, which introduced new concepts of land holding and land control for the benefit of Indigenous Australians, was an important milestone in the struggle for land rights not only for Anangu but for Indigenous communities worldwide. During discussion of the Bill, state Premier David Tonkin described it as "very much one of the most significant pieces of legislation which has come before this Parliament in its entire history".

In 1984, the High Court of Australia described the Act as:

a special measure for the purpose of adjusting the law of the State to grant legal recognition and protection of the claims of the Anunga [sic] Pitjantjatjara to the traditional homelands on which they live and as the legal means by which present and future generations may take up and rebuild their relationship with their country in accordance with tradition, free of disturbance from others

In 2001, the ongoing significance of the Act was recognised in a major centenary of Federation project charting the development of Australian democracy through key documents.

== Geographical scope ==
The land grant of all Anangu Pitjantjatjara Yankunyjatjara land is dated 30 October 1981 and covers an area of about 102,650 square kilometres (39,630 mi^{2}), or about 10.4% of the State. The westerly section that comprises over half the APY Lands was formerly the North West Aboriginal Reserve, first proclaimed in 1921. Other former pastoral lease land, formerly known as Everard Park, Kenmore Park and Granite Downs, are included in the lands.

The mining township of Mintabie was leased back to the state government, for an initial period of 21 years, as part of the agreement which became the Bill passed in parliament. The lease was later extended to 30 June 2027; however, after a 2017 report finding that the settlement had become a centre for illegal distribution of drugs and alcohol into the APY Lands, the lease was terminated, with a final eviction date of 31 December 2019.

== Amendments ==
There were amendments to the Act in 1987, 2004, 2005 and several in 2006; minor amendments in 2009, 2013 and 2014. The more significant amendments include:

- The Anangu Pitjantjatjara Yankunytjatjara Land Rights (Mintabie) Amendment Act 2009 (commenced 1 July 2012) introduced a licensing regime whereby outsiders could reside and operate businesses in Mintabie, granted by the Minister administering the Opal Mining Act 1995.
- The Anangu Pitjantjatjara Yankunytjatjara Lands Rights (Miscellaneous) Amendment Act 2016 delivered key reforms, and determined the boundaries of seven APY electorates to elect the Executive Board of Anangu Pitjantjatjara Yankunytjatjara.
- The Anangu Pitjantjatjara Yankunytjatjara Land Rights (Suspension of Executive Board) Amendment Act 2017 "continued the Premier’s power, as the Minister responsible for Aboriginal Affairs and Reconciliation, to suspend the APY Executive Board for any reason he or she thinks fit, for such period as deemed appropriate, and for this power to be on-going".

== See also ==
- List of laws concerning Indigenous Australians
