= Marla, South Australia =

Marla
- Town
- Coordinates: 27°17′59″S 133°37′21″E
- Country: Australia
- State: South Australia
- Region: Far North
- LGA: Pastoral Unincorporated Area
- Location: 970 km (600 mi) North of Adelaide; 402 km (250 mi) South of Alice Springs
- Established: 21 May 1981 (town); 8 February 2001 (locality)

Government
  - State electorate: Stuart
  - Federal division: Grey
- Elevation (airport): 328 m (1,076 ft)

Population
  - Total: 38 (SAL 2021)
- Time zone: UTC+9:30 (ACST)
  - Summer (DST): UTC+10:30 (ACST)
- Postcode: 5724
- Mean max temp: 28.7 °C (83.7 °F)
- Mean min temp: 13.6 °C (56.5 °F)
- Annual rainfall: 234.4 mm (9.23 in)
Localities around Marla
Welbourn Hill	Welbourn Hill	Welbourn Hill
Welbourn Hill	Marla	Welbourn Hill
Welbourn Hill	Welbourn Hill	Welbourn Hill

Marla is a town and locality in the Australian state of South Australia located in the state's north-west about 970 kilometres (600 mi) north-west of the state capital of Adelaide and about 402 kilometres (250 mi) south of the town of Alice Springs in the Northern Territory.

== History ==
Marla was constituted as a government town under the Crown Lands Act 1929-1980 on 21 May 1981 and was gazetted as a locality under the Geographical Names Act 1991 on 8 February 2001 with the assigned boundaries being similar to that of the government town. The name is derived from the Marla Bore which is located to west of Marla and whose name is reported as being ultimately "a corruption of the Aboriginal marlu – 'a kangaroo'".

Geoffrey H. Manning, the South Australian historian, reports that the town was proclaimed as a place for "the provision of essential services to travellers crossing the continent" and to act as an administrative centre for the north-west part of the state including the Aṉangu Pitjantjatjara Yankunytjatjara lands and the Mintabie Opal Field to the town's west.

== Transport ==
The Stuart Highway passes through the south-west side of Marla while the alignment of the Adelaide-Darwin railway is located outside of its boundaries on the south-west side of the highway. While a site is designated as a railway station with the name Marla Siding on the south side of the railway, it is not a scheduled stop for rail services such as The Ghan as of 2018 for Marla and adjoining localities. However the northbound Ghan stops outside Marla for a morning breakfast experience.

== Facilities ==
The town includes a health center "Marla Clinic" operated on behalf of the state government by the Royal Flying Doctor Service, a regional police station and a privately owned complex called the Marla Travellers Rest which is described as consisting of "roadhouse, hotel and motel, restaurant, service station, supermarket, caravan park and much more”. It also is a Licensed Post Office (LPO) for Australia Post.

== Aerodrome ==
Marla Airport (also known as Marla Aerodrome) is located about 1.8 nautical miles (3.3 km) to the south of the town in the adjoining locality of Welbourn Hill.

== Governance ==
Marla is located within the federal division of Grey, the state electoral district of Stuart, the Pastoral Unincorporated Area of South Australia and the state government region of the Far North. As of 2018, the community within Marla received municipal services from a South Australian government agency, the Outback Communities Authority.

== Weather station ==
The Marla Police Station has been the site of an official weather station since 1985.

Climate data for Marla Police Station, Marla, South Australia
Month	Jan	Feb	Mar	Apr	May	Jun	Jul	Aug	Sep	Oct	Nov	Dec	Year
Mean daily maximum °C (°F)	37.3 (99.1)	36.1 (97.0)	32.7 (90.9)	28.4 (83.1)	23.1 (73.6)	19.6 (67.3)	19.8 (67.6)	22.4 (72.3)	27.0 (80.6)	30.0 (86.0)	33.1 (91.6)	35.1 (95.2)	28.7 (83.7)
Mean daily minimum °C (°F)	22.0 (71.6)	21.4 (70.5)	17.8 (64.0)	13.4 (56.1)	9.1 (48.4)	5.5 (41.9)	4.8 (40.6)	6.2 (43.2)	10.8 (51.4)	14.3 (57.7)	17.8 (64.0)	20.0 (68.0)	13.6 (56.5)
Average rainfall mm (inches)	14.1 (0.56)	30.5 (1.20)	22.5 (0.89)	12.2 (0.48)	14.3 (0.56)	13.1 (0.52)	12.4 (0.49)	7.3 (0.29)	9.8 (0.39)	19.4 (0.76)	22.7 (0.89)	38.6 (1.52)	234.4 (9.23)
Average rainy days	1.7	2.3	1.7	1.7	2.3	2.0	1.8	1.1	1.5	2.9	3.4	3.4	25.8

Preceding station	Journey Beyond	Following station
Alice Springs towards Darwin	The Ghan towards Darwin only	Adelaide One-way operation
