= Eileen Yaritja Stevens =

Australian painter (c.1910–2008)

- Born: c. 1915–1919; Makiri, South Australia
- Died: 19 February 2008 (aged 88-93); Pukatja, South Australia
- Occupation: Painter
- Years active: 2004–2008
- Organization: Tjungu Palya
- Style: Western Desert art

Eileen Yaritja Stevens (died 19 February 2008) was an Aboriginal artist from central Australia. Although she had brief career of less than four years, she quickly became one of the most successful artists of her generation to paint in the style of the Western Desert. Her work is now held in several major public art collections across Australia.

== Life ==
Stevens was born some time in the 1910s. She was born at Makiri, in the north-west corner of South Australia, between what are now the communities of Kaltjiti and Watarru. Her father was a Yankunytjatjara man, and her mother was Ngaanyatjarra, but Stevens described herself as belonging to the Pitjantjatjara.

Stevens grew up in the bush, living a traditional, nomadic way of life. When she was a young woman, her family settled at Ernabella, which was a Presbyterian mission at the time. She worked there milking goats. Her husband, who she met whilst living at Ernabella, also worked there chopping trees for use in building projects. The couple later moved to Nyapaṟi after it was established in the mid-1970s. This area was her husband's Dreaming country (homeland), and although she often made visits to her own birthplace, Stevens would live at Nyapaṟi for the rest of her life.

=== As an artist ===
Stevens did not begin painting professionally until 2004, very late in her life. Her husband had died by then, and Stevens had become close friends with Wingu Tingima. Tingima had already established herself as an artist in Irrunytju. The two women began to paint for Nyapaṟi's local community art centre, Tjungu Palya, after it was opened in 2006. They often painted alongside one another, sharing creative ideas and travelling to their exhibitions together. Eileen's daughter, Yaritja Stevens, was married to Tingima's son; and the two shared grandchildren. As the success of their art increased, they became the main providers of income for their combined families.

Stevens had a short career of less than four years. However, her art had immediate success. Her early works – those before Tjungu Palya – were shown in group exhibitions in Melbourne, Adelaide, Sydney and Alice Springs. Her first (and only) solo exhibition was held in October 2007, less than a year before her death. The exhibition, called "Minyma Kutju: One Woman", was held at the Vivien Anderson Gallery in Melbourne.

Stevens died on 19 February 2008, at Ernabella. Her funeral was held in Kaltjiti. Her paintings continued to be featured in many other exhibitions alongside other Tjungu Palya artists, even after her death. Stevens' work is held in the National Gallery of Victoria, the Art Gallery of South Australia, the Art Gallery of Western Australia, the Kluge-Ruhe Aboriginal Art Collection of the University of Virginia, and the National Gallery of Australia.

== Artwork ==
Stevens' art focused on her family's Dreaming (a kind of spirituality). Makiri, where she was born, is a sacred place for Aṉangu women. In her paintings, Stevens depicted the Dreaming associated with this place, the Minyma Tjala Tjukurpa. She also painted stories about Piltati, near her husband's birthplace, which is closely related to the Two Snake Men Dreaming (Wati Wanampi Kutjara Tjukurpa). The paintings featured in her solo show in Melbourne were all related to this particular Dreaming.

Stevens' style was described as bold and dominating. She was said to paint quickly, with a rich mixture of colours, and her paintings were done on large canvases.
