= Tarnanthi =

Art festival in Adelaide, South Australia

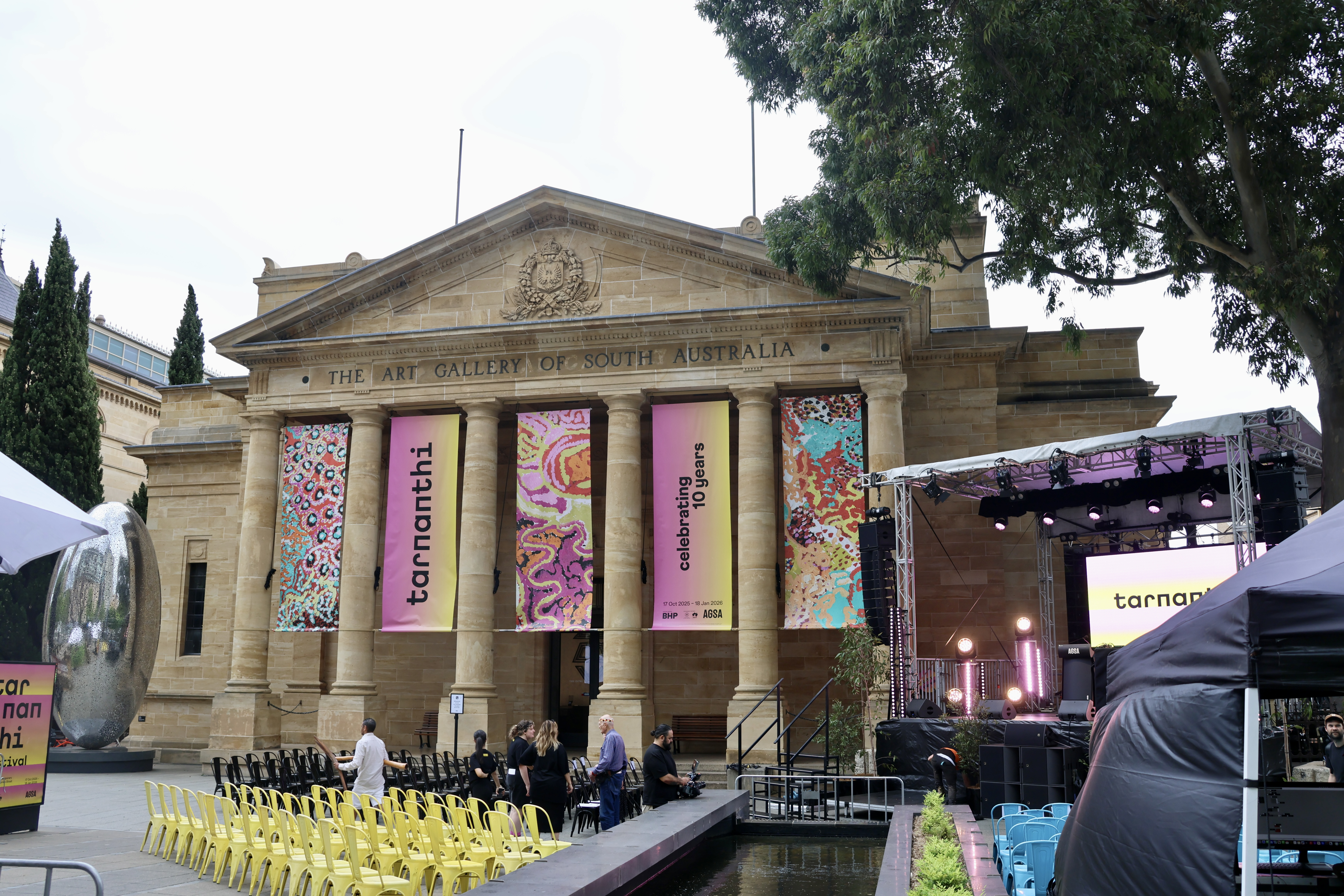
- Tarnanthi 2025, outside the AGSA
- Genre: Art festival
- Frequency: Annual
- Venue: Adelaide
- Country: Australia
- Years active: 2015—
- Inaugurated: October 2015
- Organiser: Art Gallery of South Australia
- People: Zali Morgan
- Sponsors: Government of South Australia, BHP
- Website: www.tarnanthi.com.au/about/

Tarnanthi (pronounced tar-nan-dee) is a Festival of Contemporary Aboriginal and Torres Strait Islander Art held in Adelaide, South Australia, annually. Presented by the Art Gallery of South Australia (AGSA) in association with the South Australian Government and BHP. It was curated by Nici Cumpston from its inception in 2015 until January 2025, with Zali Morgan taking over from October 2026.

== History ==
The South Australian Government and BHP initially negotiated funding, before approaching AGSA about hosting the festival. The first edition of the festival was held by AGSA in 2015, which said it was "the most ambitious exhibition of Aboriginal and Torres Strait Islander art in [AGSA's] 134-year history".

The word tarnanthi is a Kaurna word from the traditional owners of the Adelaide Plains, the Kaurna people, meaning "to rise, come forth, spring up or appear", or "to emerge", like the sun at first light. It signifies new beginnings. As artistic director since the inaugural event, Nici Cumpston, a Barkindji artist and curator based at AGSA, collaborated with a group of elders and community members who speak the language to help translate the word used as the name, as well as Kaurna Language Revival Unit at the University of Adelaide. She has also collaborated with many others, representing arts centres from all over Australia. Those hailing from the South Australian desert have been well-represented: the Anangu, Pitjantjatjara and Yankunytjatjara people from the APY lands.

JamFactory has been involved with the event since the first edition.

There was no exhibition in 2016, but by 2017 it had expanded to include an Indigenous art fair at the Tandanya National Aboriginal Cultural Institute, as well as a large number of satellite exhibitions spread throughout Adelaide and beyond, featuring more than 1000 artists. Tarnanthi had attracted over 1.4 million visitors between its first edition in 2015 and its fifth in 2020.

In October 2021, funding was assured for a further three years.

Cumpston left in January 2025 after being appointed director of Kluge-Ruhe Aboriginal Art Collection at the University of Virginia in Charlottesville.

Noongar curator and artist Zali Morgan was announced as the new director of Tarnanthi on 14 October 2026. , She has been curator of the Carrolup Collection at the John Curtin Gallery in Perth, Western Australia, and will remain in the position in a part-time capacity, travelling to Adelaide as needed.

== Description ==
Tarnanthi seeks to present Indigenous Australian history and culture as a legacy to be shared by all Australians, showcasing the expansiveness of contemporary Aboriginal and Torres Strait Islander art "on a scale that [hadn't] been seen before". It is intended as a broad platform, at which artists can exhibit their work in a way that does not pigeonhole their work.

It includes an annual Art Fair as well as artist talks, performances and events.

== Governance and funding ==
Tarnanthi is funded by the state government through AGSA, and BHP. In October 2026, Kyam Maher, Minister for the Arts and Aboriginal Affairs, announced A$4m in funding from 2026 to 2030, for Tarnanthi and other First Nations Art. BHP has signed up to co-fund the festival until 2031. Zali Morgan will programme the festival in 2027 and 2029.

== Exhibitions ==
=== 2015 ===
A tribute to Ngarra, from Derby in the Western Desert of Western Australia, was included in the inaugural exhibition, along with "the Namatjira Collection", watercolours painted in the tradition of Albert Namatjira by his descendants. The 2015 exhibition also included work by Warwick Thornton, film-maker from Alice Springs, as well as Dinni Kunoth Petyarre and Josie Kunoth Petyarre, residents of Utopia in Central Australia, with artworks exploring the world of "bush footy" through painted hand carvings of figures representing 16 AFL teams. There was a focus exhibition of work by Yvonne Koolmatrie. The whole event was a huge success, featuring works from more than 1000 artists and attracting more than 300,000 visitors.

=== 2017 ===
In 2017, artists from the APY lands produced several enormous works for installation at AGSA, including two paintings on repurposed canvas mailbags, both stretched to three metres by five. 21 men collaborated on one work, 24 women on the other, with contributions spanning seven communities from the far northwest of SA: Pukatja, Amata, Mimili, Indulkana, Nyapari, Fregon and Kalka. A centrepiece of the 2017 event was a part of the ongoing Kulata Tjuta (“Many Spears”) project that would have than 600 spears suspended from the ceiling of AGSA in the shape of a mushroom cloud, representing the ongoing impact of the 1950s and 60s British nuclear testing on Anangu country.

=== 2018 ===
The 2018 exhibition at AGSA featured the work of John Mawurndjul's bark paintings in the first major exhibition of his work in Australia, with a focus exhibition entitled John Mawurndjul: I am the old and the new.

=== 2019 ===
In July 2019 it was announced that the Tarnanthi Festival would run from 18 to 27 Oct 2019, with the Art Fair at Tandanya on the opening weekend and the AGSA exhibition continuing until 27 January 2020. The exhibition will feature exhibits from over 1000 artists from all over the continent and the Tiwi Islands, ranging in age from 15 to 81 years and working in a wide range of media: painting, photography, printmaking, carving, sculpture, moving image, works on paper and textiles.

Opening night was on 17 October, with Yolŋu rap artist Baker Boy performing at the opening event outside the Gallery on North Terrace.

An exhibition of colonial artworks alongside the tools and objects of Aboriginal people, accompanied by carefully researched text and commentary by Wiradjuri/Kamilaroi artist Jonathan Jones, writer and researcher Bruce Pascoe and historian Bill Gammage, is the subject of an exhibition entitled Bunha-bunhanga: Aboriginal agriculture in the south-east, mounted in the AGSA's Elder Wing, Gallery 1 and the Museum of Economic Botany. Jones created a series of outsize grindstones within the Museum building.

=== 2020 ===
The 2020 exhibition, held from 16 October 2020 until 31 January 2021, was subtitled Open Hands, and focused on Indigenous women artists. The works by 87 artists included Naomi Hobson's Adolescent Wonderland; work from the Tangentyere Artists in Mparntwe (Alice Springs; woven sculptures from Arnhem Land; and works from Anangu Pitjantjatjara Yankunytjatjara (APY) Lands. Occurring during the COVID-19 pandemic in South Australia, there was some uncertainty whether it could go ahead, and when it did, AGSA had to work within various restrictions and precautions to ensure that it was safe, with the Art Fair postponed to early December.

=== 2021 ===
In 2021, as the pandemic continued, the Art Fair went online, but the exhibition was mounted from mid-October to the end of January at the art gallery and partner venues, including the Migration Museum, the South Australian Museum, JamFactory (Adelaide and Seppeltsfield), Port Pirie Regional Art Gallery and Yarta Purtli Gallery at the Port Augusta Cultural Centre. The exhibition included works by 189 artists at the gallery, including large works by Gail Mabo and Julie Gough, with around 1400 other artists participating in total.

=== 2023 ===
In 2023 The Art Gallery of South Australia as part of the Tarnanthi Festival showed Vincent Namatjira: Australia in Colour and portrayed the artist's first survey exhibition. The Tarnanthi Art Fair was held as both an online and physical event, with opportunity to meet the artists. Arrernte/Gurindji singer-songwriter Dan Sultan launched the Tarnanthi festival with a free music concert and public event on the forecourt of the Art Gallery of South Australia.

=== 2025 ===
In 2025, Tarnanthi featured over 200 works that had featured over the previous ten festivals and had become part of AGSA's permanent collection, and were displayed across the state at 25 partner venues. The exhibition was titled Too Deadly, Ten Years of Tarnanthi, and included significant works such as Kuḻaṯa Tjuṯa (Many Spears) and Yhonnie Scarce's Thunder Raining Poison, which both reference the British nuclear tests at Maralinga. The festival opened on 16 October with a free concert by hip-hop supergroup 3% and DJ Ian Buller. The in-person Tarnanthi Art Fair on the opening weekend was attended by 4,225 people and $920,583 worth of art was sold.
