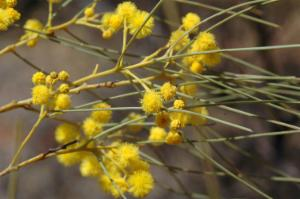

Scientific classification
- Kingdom: Plantae
- Clade: Tracheophytes
- Clade: Angiosperms
- Clade: Eudicots
- Clade: Rosids
- Order: Fabales
- Family: Fabaceae
- Subfamily: Caesalpinioideae
- Clade: Mimosoid clade
- Genus: Acacia
- Species: A. pachyacra

Binomial name
- Acacia pachyacra Maiden & Blakely
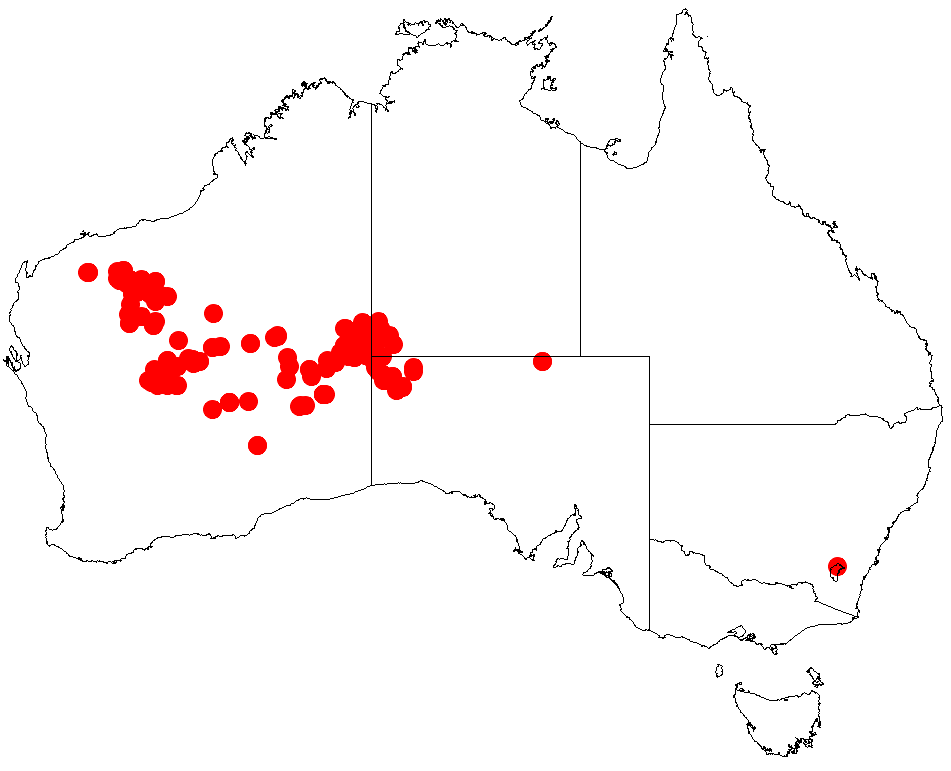
- Occurrence data from AVH

Synonyms
- Racosperma pachyacrum (Maiden & Blakely) Pedley

= Acacia pachyacra =

Species of legume

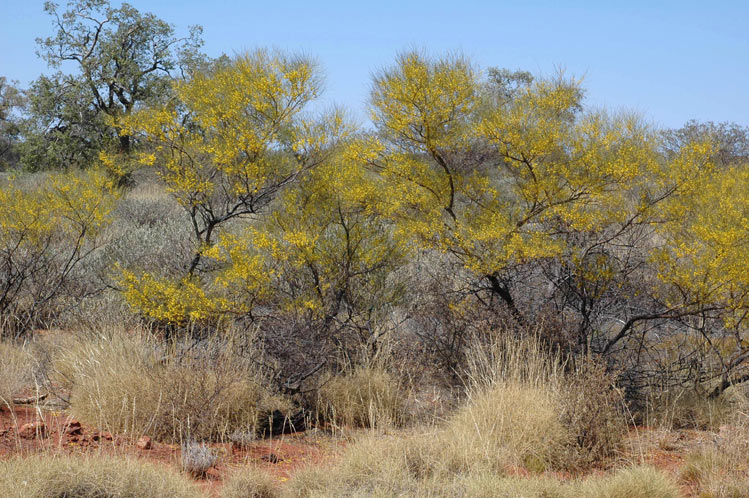
Habit near the Kumarina roadhouse

Acacia pachyacra is a species of flowering plant in the family Fabaceae, and is endemic to arid parts of Western Australia and central Australia. It is a shrub or tree with slender, glabrous branchlets sometimes covered with a white powdery bloom, ascending to erect, thread-like phyllodes, spherical heads of light golden to mid-golden yellow flowers and narrowly oblong, papery pods.

== Description ==
Acacia pachyacra is a shrub or tree that typically grows to a height of 1–5 m (3 ft 3 in – 16 ft 5 in) and often has a bushy appearance with a soft, dense canopy that produces a hissing sound in windy conditions similar to sheoak (Casuarina or Allocasuarina) or Athol pine (Tamarix). Its bark is smooth and grey, slightly roughened at the base and it has slender, glabrous branchlets, sometimes covered with a white, powdery bloom. The phyllodes are assending to erect and thread-like, straight to slightly curved, four-sided in cross section or more or less terete, 80–200 mm (3.1–7.9 in) long and 0.5–1 mm (0.020–0.039 in) wide. There is a curved point at the tip of the phyllodes, a gland at the base and four veins. The flowers are borne in spherical heads in racemes 10–30 mm (0.39–1.18 in) long, each head a peduncles 4–7 mm (0.16–0.28 in) long with 20 to 30 light golden to mid-golden yellow flowers. Flowering occurs from August to October, and the pods are narrowly oblong, up to 80 mm (3.1 in) long, 7–11 mm (0.28–0.43 in) wide, papery, light brown and glabrous. The seeds are oblong to widely elliptic or round, 4.5–5.5 mm (0.18–0.22 in) long, dull black and there is no aril.

== Taxonomy ==
Acacia pachyacra was first formally described in 1927 by Joseph Maiden and William Blakely in the Journal of the Royal Society of Western Australia from specimens collected by Richard Helms near the Barrow Range in the Victoria Desert, during the Elder Exploring Expedition in 1891. The specific epithet is taken from Greek pachys meaning 'thick' and akron meaning 'top' in reference to the thickened mucro on the top of the phyllodes.

== Distribution and habitat ==
This species of wattle grows in sand in spinifex country from Mount Farquhar, in the Central Ranges, Gascoyne, Gibson Desert, Great Sandy Desert, Great Victoria Desert, Little Sandy Desert, Murchison and Pilbara bioregions of Western Australia, to the Docker River area in the south-west of the Northern Territory and the Birksgate and Musgrave Ranges in north-western South Australia.

== See also ==
- List of Acacia species
