= Kunytjanu, South Australia =

Coordinates: 26°39′S 129°22′E

Location of Kunytjanu in South Australia

Kunytjanu (commonly written Kuntjanu) is an Aboriginal community and waterhole in northwestern South Australia. It is serviced from the community of Pipalyatjara to the north. It is located on the road between Pipalyatjara and Watarru. It was established as an outstation in 1975, along with Iltur, Walytjatjata, Kunamata and several others that used Pipalyatjara as a base. It received a grant for development from the government in 1978.

The area around Kunytjanu is connected with several Dreamings. The waterhole itself is associated with the Wanampi Tjukurpa, the Dreaming of the water-snake or Rainbow Serpent.
