= Angkaliya Curtis =

Australian Aboriginal artist

- Born: c. 1928 (age 97–98); Miti, South Australia
- Occupation: Painter
- Years active: 2007 – present
- Style: Western Desert art

Angkaliya Curtis (born c. 1928) is an Australian Aboriginal artist. She paints animals from the central Australian desert.

== Early life ==
Curtis was born around 1928, at a place called Miti, in north-western South Australia. Her family are Pitjantjatjara people. They lived a traditional nomadic way of life in the desert, often walking long distances from place to place in search of food and water. While living in the bush with her family, Curtis learned about the sacred law of the land from her mother and grandmother. They taught her about the Dreamtime and her family's spiritual ancestors, about bush food and traditional healing. She also learned about traditional crafts. She made ceremonial belts and manguṟi (head rings) by spinning hair on a hand-made spindle.

When Curtis was still a child, she travelled with her mother to what is now Watarru, her mother's homeland. The family lived for a time on cattle stations, and traded dingo scalps and rabbit skins for flour, tea and sugar. They later settled on the mission at Ernabella. When she was older, Curtis married a man named Bill, and worked at Ernabella spinning wool and making rugs.

In the 1960s, she moved back west (closer to her homeland) when the outstation at Amaṯa was established. She now lives at Nyapari.

== Artwork ==
Curtis is best known for her acrylic paintings, but she is also still involved in traditional handicraft work (making grass baskets and wooden carvings). The most visible motif in Curtis' paintings are her representations of animals. Her works stand out against other artists from her region because of her subtle use of colours.

Her work has been exhibited around Australia since 2007. It was first shown internationally in 2010, in San Sebastián, Spain. Examples of her paintings are displayed in the Queensland Gallery of Modern Art, the Museum and Art Gallery of the Northern Territory, the National Gallery of Victoria, the National Gallery of Australia, and the Australian National University.

Curtis was a finalist for the National Aboriginal & Torres Strait Islander Art Award in 2010 and 2011. She was also one of 16 finalists for the Western Australian Indigenous Art Award in 2011.
