= Ginger Wikilyiri =

Australian Aboriginal artist

- Born: c. 1932 (age 93–94); Kunamata, South Australia
- Occupation: Painter
- Years active: 2005 – present
- Organization: Tjungu Palya
- Style: Western Desert art
- Relatives: Wingu Tingima (sister)

Ginger Nobby Wikilyiri is an Australian Aboriginal artist from Nyapaṟi, South Australia.

== Life ==
Wikilyiri was born around 1932, in the desert of north-western South Australia. The place where he was born is Kunamata, a rock hole south of what is now the community of Nyapaṟi. His father had three wives, and Wikilyiri is the son of the second wife. He has an elder sister, Wingu, who was borne to his father's first wife. Wikilyiri and his family, who are Pitjantjatjara, were all born and lived in the bush, living a traditional way of life. After settling at Ernabella, Wikilyiri worked in land management and horticulture. He worked for many years as a ranger for Uluṟu-Kata Tjuṯa National Park, living at Mutitjulu.

== Artwork ==
Wikilyiri paints stories from his Dreaming, the spirituality that defines his kinship with the land. The Dreaming associated with his birthplace, Kunumata, carries the kuniya (a kind of python) as its totem. Wikilyiri's paintings depict sacred legends about his ancestors and how they created the land around Kunumata. He also paints similar stories about Piltati, another rock hole nearby and a sacred site for Pitjantjatjara men. Pink dominates many of Wikilyiri's major paintings, which is an unusual choice of colour for the Western Desert style of art.

His work has been shown in major exhibitions in many cities around Australia and other countries. Examples are held in the National Gallery of Victoria, the Art Gallery of South Australia, the Australian National University, and the National Gallery of Australia. Paintings by Wikilyiri were chosen as finalists for the National Aboriginal & Torres Strait Islander Art Awards in 2009, 2010 and 2011.
