= Hector Burton =

Australian Aboriginal artist

- Born: c. 1937 near Pipalyatjara, South Australia
- Died: 27 February 2017 (aged 79–80); Ernabella, South Australia, Australia
- Occupation: Painter
- Years active: 2003 – present
- Style: Western Desert art
- Awards: 2014 Red Ochre Award

Hector Tjupuru Burton (1937 – 27 February 2017) was an Australian Aboriginal artist from Amaṯa, in north-western South Australia. His work has been shown in exhibitions since 2003, in several cities in Australia and other countries. His first solo exhibition was held in 2004 in Melbourne. Examples of his paintings are held in the National Gallery of Victoria, the Art Gallery of South Australia, the Art Gallery of New South Wales, and Flinders University.

== Early life ==
Burton was born in 1937. He was born near what is now Pipalyatjara, in north-west South Australia. A member of the Pitjantjatjara people, his childhood was spent living a traditional lifestyle in the bush. When he was still a child, Burton and his parents came out of the desert and settled at Ernabella mission. As a young man, Burton worked as a ringer at the large cattle station called Curtin Springs. He later moved to Amaṯa where he worked building dams, fences and cattle yards outside the town. He also later worked on a building project in Ernabella.

Burton was a senior custodian of traditional Pitjantjatjara law (Tjukurpa or Dreaming). His father's Country, to the west of Irrunytju, is closely associated with the Anumara Tjukurpa (Caterpillar Dreaming) and the Malu Tjukurpa (Red Kangaroo Dreaming). His mother is from Lake Wilson, about 170 km South-west from Yulara. These legends are the subjects of many of his paintings.

== Painting ==
Burton started painting in 2002. He painted for Tjala Arts, Amaṯa's community-based art company. When he started, the company was called Minymaku Arts. Painting among Pitjantjatjara was originally done by women only (minymaku means "women's"). Men did not join the women until several years later, because they were afraid of revealing too much spiritual knowledge (which in Western Desert cultures is meant to be kept secret). Burton was one of the first men at Amaṯa to begin painting; the company changed its name to Tjala Arts in 2004, after several other men joined him.

The art community at Amaṯa is still strongly conservative. Only the basics of traditional beliefs are described in their works. To keep the meanings of his paintings hidden, Burton uses dotting and other techniques to disguise sacred figures and ancient symbols. He is a strong supporter of maintaining strict forms of secrecy when it comes to art produced in his community. He is now a board member of Tjala Arts, and often coordinates projects and exhibitions with the other artists.

Burton's early paintings represent legends from his family's Dreaming. They also show strong Christian influences. Burton was taught by Presbyterian missionaries when he was growing up at Ernabella, and he mixed these beliefs with his family's Dreaming. When he was older, he was ordained as a minister, and is now a senior member of the Church on the Aṉangu Pitjantjatjara Yankunytjatjara Lands.

From the later part of 2011, Burton and several other men from Amaṯa led a project to change the subject of their artists' work. Instead of depicting sacred Dreaming knowledge, he and the other board members of Tjala Arts encouraged their artists to paint about other things (such as the landscape or wildlife). Burton and the other leaders decided that the popularity of Western Desert art had resulted in people asking too many questions about their traditional designs and too much secret knowledge being revealed. The centre's first exhibition under this project was held in March 2012, in Alice Springs. The exhibition was called Punu-Nguru (From the Trees) and its paintings depicted traditional designs of trees from the artists' home countries.

== Death ==
Burton died on 27 February 2017 in Ernabella, aged 80.

== Awards ==
Burton had paintings chosen as finalists for the National Aboriginal & Torres Strait Islander Art Awards in 2011 and 2012.

=== Australia Council for the Arts ===
The Australia Council for the Arts arts funding and advisory body for the Government of Australia. Since 1993, it has awarded a Red Ochre Award. It is presented to an outstanding Indigenous Australian (Aboriginal Australian or Torres Strait Islander) artist for lifetime achievement.

Year	Nominee / work	Award	Result
2014	himself	Red Ochre Award	Awarded
