= Makiri, South Australia =

Location in South Australia

Coordinates: 27°2′S 131°17′E

Location of Makiri in South Australia

Makiri is a location in the northwest of South Australia, where a rock hole and an Aboriginal outstation are located. It is in the Great Victoria Desert, between Kaltjiti and Watarru. It is an important sacred site for the tjala (honey ant) Dreaming, a women's law of the local Aboriginal people. Much of the site was desecrated by a surveying team in 1969. It was officially declared a Prohibited Area by the South Australian government in 1973, as an "important Aboriginal mythological and cultural site".

Makiri is located in a region of shrubland and sand dunes. The outstation here was established in the early 1980s. Since 1984, it has been governed and supported by the Irintata Homelands group from Kaltjiti. There is one house with solar power. Water is supplied from a rainwater tank and a bore. It is often used as a research base by scientists, as the area supports several endangered species.

== Notable person ==
- Eileen Yaritja Stevens
