= Prostanthera sericea =

Silky mintbush

Scientific classification
- Kingdom: Plantae
- Clade: Tracheophytes
- Clade: Angiosperms
- Clade: Eudicots
- Clade: Asterids
- Order: Lamiales
- Family: Lamiaceae
- Genus: Prostanthera
- Species: P. sericea

Binomial name
- Prostanthera sericea (J.M.Black) B.J.Conn
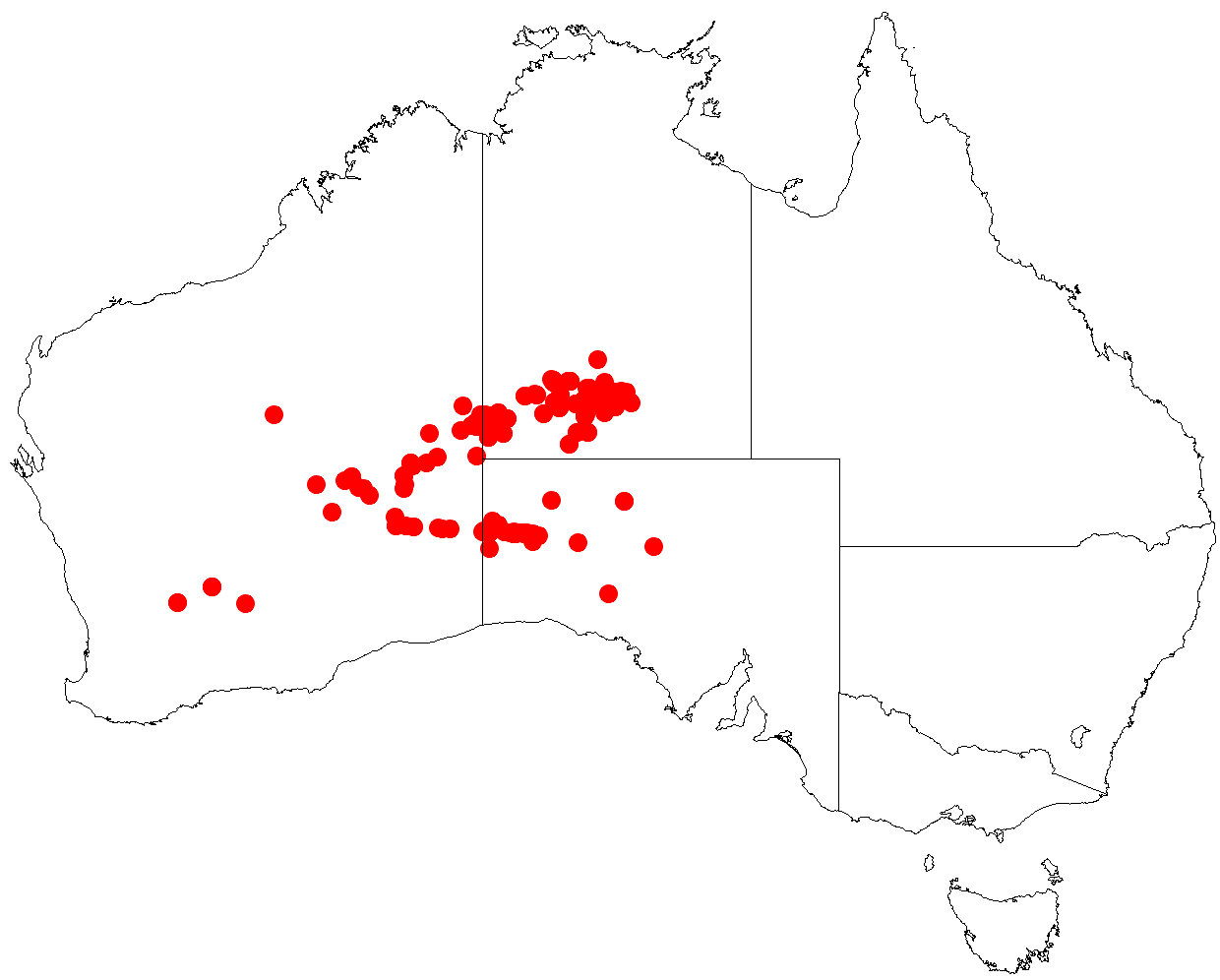
- Occurrence data from AVH

Synonyms
- Prostanthera baxteri var. sericea J.M.Black; Prostanthera baxteri auct. non A.Cunn. ex Benth.: Tate, R. (1890)

Species of flowering plant

Prostanthera sericea, commonly known as silky mintbush or walyuwalyu, is a species of flowering plant in the family Lamiaceae and is endemic to inland Australia. It is an erect shrub with hairy branches, cylindrical leaves and white flowers with mauve or purple streaks.

== Description ==
Prostanthera sericea is an erect shrub that typically grows to a height of 1–2 m (3 ft 3 in – 6 ft 7 in) with its branches and leaves covered with silvery green or greyish green hairs. The leaves are cylindrical, sometimes with a groove along the lower surface, 10–53 mm (0.39–2.09 in) long and 0.5–3.5 mm (0.020–0.138 in) wide and sessile. The flowers are arranged in groups of four to fourteen on the ends of the branches, each flower on a hairy pedicel 1.5–3 mm (0.059–0.118 in) long. The sepals are cream-coloured and form a tube 1.5–3.5 mm (0.059–0.138 in) long with two lobes, the lower lobe 1.2–2.8 mm (0.047–0.110 in) long and the upper lobe 2–5.4 mm (0.079–0.213 in) long. The petals are 7–10 mm (0.28–0.39 in) long and white with mauve or purple streaks inside the petal tube. The middle lobe of the lower lip is spatula-shaped, 3–5 mm (0.12–0.20 in) long and the side lobes are egg-shaped, 2–4.5 mm (0.079–0.177 in) long. The upper lip is egg-shaped with the lower end towards the base, 1.5–5.5 mm (0.059–0.217 in) long with a central notch 0.5–2.5 mm (0.020–0.098 in) deep. Flowering occurs from July to December or March.

== Taxonomy ==
Silky mintbush was first formally described in 1926 by John McConnell Black who gave it the name Prostanthera baxteri var. sericea in the Flora of South Australia from specimens collected near the Birksgate Range during the Elder expedition of 1891. In 1988, Barry Conn raised the variety to species status as Prostanthera sericea in the journal Nuytsia.

== Distribution and habitat ==
Prostanthera sericea grows on stony hills, in rocky gorges and on sand dunes and sandplains in the east of Western Australia, southern Northern Territory and western South Australia.
