= Wawiriya Burton =

Australian Aboriginal artist (c.1928–2021)

- Born: 1920s near Pipalyatjara, South Australia
- Other name: Wawiya Burton
- Occupation: Artist
- Years active: 2008–2021
- Style: Western Desert art

Wawiriya Burton (c. 1928 – 2021) was an Australian Aboriginal artist. She is known for her acrylic paintings. Her paintings are representations of sacred stories from the Dreamtime. Like other Aboriginal artists, the representations are blurred (or encrypted) for cultural reasons. The full meaning of her artworks can only be understood or deciphered by people who have been initiated. Burton is a ngangkaṟi (traditional healer), so she has more knowledge about sacred traditions than most in her community.

Wawiriya belongs to the Pitjantjatjara. She was born in outback central Australia some time during the 1920s.. She grew up living a traditional, nomadic way of life. Her family lived in her father's homeland, around what is now Pipalyatjara.

Wawiriya lived in Amaṯa, where she began working at the Tjala Arts centre in 2008. Tjala (originally Minymaku Arts) had been set up by the women of the community in 1999. She made wood carvings and baskets from spinifex originally, but later learned to paint from the other women.

Wawiriya's artworks have been displayed in exhibitions in Sydney, Canberra, Melbourne, Adelaide, Perth and Alice Springs. Her work is held in the National Gallery of Victoria, the Art Gallery of New South Wales, and the Art Gallery of South Australia.
