= Iltur =

Aboriginal community in South Australia

Coordinates: 27°32′S 130°33′E

Iltur is a remote Pitjantjatjara homeland in the Great Victoria Desert of South Australia. It is also known as Coffin Hill after the rocky outcrop where it is located, and the traditional country surrounding it is known in Pitjantjatjara as Ilturnga. It is located at the southern end of the Birksgate Range, and is one of the most southerly locations on the Aṉangu Pitjantjatjara Yankunytjatjara Lands. It was visited by the Elder Scientific Exploring Expedition in 1881, led by the explorer David Lindsay.

Many of the families who had lived in this region historically were forced to leave the area due to nuclear weapons tests at Maralinga. They were moved northward to Fregon and southward to Yalata. Not all of them left, however, and some still living around Iltur reported that they were affected by the fallout of the tests. In 1976, the Department of Aboriginal Affairs offered AU$10,000 for the establishment of an outstation at Iltur. An outstation was built, but is not always occupied.
