= Birksgate Range =

Mountain range in South Australia

- Location within South Australia

Geography
- Country: Australia
- State: South Australia
- Range coordinates: 27°01′56″S 129°52′21″E

The Birksgate Range is a scattered range of mountains in the northwest of South Australia. It is located on the northeastern edges of the Great Victoria Desert, spreading for about 100 kilometres (62 mi) from Iltur in the southeast to Watarru in the northwest. The northern portion of it is located within the Watarru Indigenous Protected Area. The range consists of scattered protrusions of granitic rock that have been weathered into rounded and rugged hills. They are not visibly connected to each other, with each outcrop being separated by flat expanses of plains and sand dunes. The mountains are fairly low in elevation; they are highest at the northern end.

The most prominent peaks in the range are Mounts Lindsay (819 metres (2,687 ft)) and Wooltarlinna, at the northeastern end of the range, near Watarru. Further southwest are Mounts Holder and Sir Thomas (773 metres (2,536 ft)). From here the range spreads southeast along the edge of the desert, and the hills generally become lower and more widely dispersed. Mount Poondinna (678 metres (2,224 ft)) is the highest peak in the central part of the range. Mounts Cheesman and Yaroona (also spelled Yaruna) are further to the southeast. The southern end of the range is at Iltur (Coffin Hill).

The Birksgate Range was named by the explorer David Lindsay, who led the Elder Scientific Exploring Expedition across the Great Victoria Desert between April 1891 and March 1892. He named the range for the man who funded and equipped their expedition, Sir Thomas Elder. "Birksgate" was the name of Elder's house in Adelaide.
