= Scaevola obovata =

Scientific classification
- Kingdom: Plantae
- Clade: Embryophytes
- Clade: Tracheophytes
- Clade: Spermatophytes
- Clade: Angiosperms
- Clade: Eudicots
- Clade: Asterids
- Order: Asterales
- Family: Goodeniaceae
- Genus: Scaevola
- Species: S. obovata

Binomial name
- Scaevola obovata R.Br.
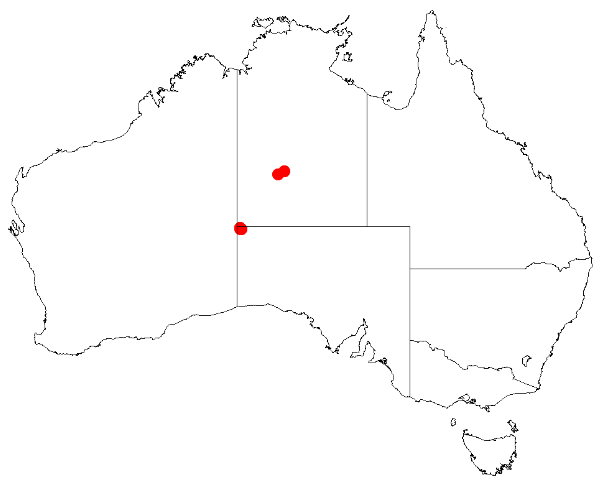
- Occurrence data from AVH

Species of shrub

Scaevola obovata is a species of flowering plant in the family Goodeniaceae and is endemic to Central Australia. It is a spreading shrub with woody and hairy lower branches, sessile, toothed, egg-shaped to oblong leaves, and spikes of blue flowers.

== Description ==
Scaevola obovata is a spreading shrub that typically grows up to 50 cm (20 in) and often has tough, woody lower branches covered with soft, simple hairs and many short, glandular hairs. Its leaves are sessile, egg-shaped with the narrower end towards the base, to oblong, 30–40 mm (1.2–1.6 in) long and 10–20 mm (0.39–0.79 in) wide with toothed edges. The flowers are borne in spikes up to 150 mm (5.9 in) long, with leafy bracts and linear bracteoles 6–8 mm (0.24–0.31 in) long. The sepals are rim-like and sinuate and the petals blue, 16–18 mm (0.63–0.71 in) long, with soft hairs and short, glandular ones on the outside and densely bearded inside. The ovary has two locules. Flowering possibly occurs from May to August but the fruit has not been observed.

== Taxonomy ==
Scaevola obovata was first formally described in 1992 by Roger Carolin in the Flora of Australia from specimens collected by Joseph Zvonko Weber (1930–1996) on Dulgunia Hill in the Tomkinson Ranges in 1978. The specific epithet (obovata) means 'inverted egg-shaped', referring to the leaves.

== Distribution and habitat ==
This species of Scaevola grows on rocky hillsides in the Tomkinson Ranges in the north-west of South Australia and the Burt Plain and Central Ranges of the Northern Territory.

== Conservation status ==
Scaevola obovata is listed as 'vulnerable' in South Australia and as 'data deficient' under the Northern Territory Government Territory Park and Wildlife Conservation Act.
