= Lola Greeno =

Australian Aboriginal artist and curator

- Born: Lola Sainty; 27 May 1946 (age 79); Cape Barren Island
- Awards: Red Ochre Award 2019

Lola Greeno (born Lola Sainty, 27 May 1946 on Cape Barren Island) is an artist, curator and arts worker of Aboriginal descent. She studied a Bachelor of Fine Arts at the University of Tasmania in Launceston, finishing her degree in 1997.

Greeno specialises in traditional Tasmanian Aboriginal shell necklace threading, a skill passed down from her mother and maternal grandmother. Greeno started making these necklaces when she was in her 50s: her work has been essential in the continuation of these skills. In a 2004 interview Greeno said:

I learned to make solely from working with my mother … It was my mother who was very keen for us to work together and this has been the important cultural lesson I learnt from her – teaching respect for one another.

In addition to her art practice, Greeno trained as a Curator of Aboriginal Art at the University of Tasmania and completed an internship as a Regional Indigenous Curator at the National Gallery of Australia. From 2003 to 2013 Greeno worked as a Program Officer for Arts Tasmania, facilitating cross-cultural exchanges between Tasmanian, Australian and international indigenous people.

In 2014, Greeno was the first Indigenous person to be recognised by the Australian Design Centre's Living Treasure Master of Australian Art Award. In 2015 she was entered on the Tasmanian Honour Roll of Women for service to Aboriginal Affairs and the Arts. A touring exhibition of her work, Lola Greeno: Living Treasure has been showing in galleries across Australia from 2014 to the present.

Lola Greeno’s exhibition Cultural Jewels, exhibiting fifty of her works, was part of the 2016 Adelaide Biennial of Australian Art. During the Biennial, on 27 February in Bradley Forum, Level 5, Hawke Building, UniSA, a panel discussion on Animism and Object Behaviour, facilitated by West Australian curator and writer Gemma Weston, focused on the work of Lola Greeno. The panelists, who were also 2016 Adelaide Biennial artists, included Louise Haselton, Danie Mellor and Clare Milledge.

Her work is held in many public collections, including the Powerhouse Museum, National Gallery of Australia, the National Gallery of Victoria, the Queen Victoria Museum and Art Gallery, the Tasmanian Museum and Art Gallery, and the Queensland Art Gallery. Greeno’s work, Shell Necklace, 1995, held at the National Gallery of Australia, is made from a variety of materials, including Cockles, Maireener shells, cat's teeth, button shells and string.

To create her works Greeno spends months collecting and polishing shells. These necklaces hold great cultural significance, often created by descendants of Tasmanian Aboriginal people from Cape Barren Island as expressions of devotion, parting or love.

In 2020, Greeno's work Green Maireener shell necklace was featured in the National Gallery of Australia's exhibition, Know My Name, an initiative to celebrate the work of all women artists.

== Exhibitions ==
1992, The Quilt Form, Collaborative work of six Tasmanian artists and five students from the Textiles Department.

1992, Parlevar Art, Devonport Gallery and Arts Centre.

1993, Trouwerner, Tasmanian Aboriginal Artists Exhibition, Gallery B, University of Tasmania.

1995, Nuini: Our culture is alive, Tasmanian Aboriginal Artists Exhibition, Gallery A, University of Tasmania.

1996, Diverse Matters, Gallery B, University of Tasmania.

1996, Guddhabungan: A Festival of Aboriginal and Torres Strait Islander Art, Australian National University, Drill Hall, Canberra.

1997, Aboriginal Art, Savode Gallery, Brisbane.

1997, Cultural Forms - curated an exhibition of Tasmanian Aboriginal Baskets, Gallery B, University of Tasmania Launceston.

1997, Boxed In, Gallery B, University of Tasmania Launceston.

1997, Circles around the Body, Gallery A, University of Tasmania Launceston.

1998, Ecology of Place and Memory, Gallery A, University of Tasmania Launceston.

1998, Many Voices, Tamworth City Gallery, Tamworth, NSW.

1998, Mapping Identity, Centre for Contemporary Craft, Circular Quay, Sydney.

1998, Ways of Being, Ivan Dougherty Gallery, University of New South Wales, Sydney.

1999, Island to Island, Forestry Tasmania, Hobart.

2000, Beyond the Pale, Telstra Adelaide Festival, Art Gallery of South Australia, Adelaide.

2000-01, Across, Australian National University, Canberra.

2001, Response to the Island, Long Gallery, Hobart Tasmania.

2001, A Survey of Indigenous Jewellery and Body Adornment, Redback Gallery, Brisbane.

2001, Tribal, Handmark Gallery, Salamanca Place, Hobart.

2001, Strings Across Time, Queen Victoria Museum and Art Gallery.

== Awards ==
=== Australia Council for the Arts ===
The Australia Council for the Arts is the arts funding and advisory body for the Government of Australia. Since 1993, it has awarded a Red Ochre Award. It is presented to an outstanding Indigenous Australian (Aboriginal Australian or Torres Strait Islander) artist for lifetime achievement.

Year	Nominee / work	Award	Result
2019	herself	Red Ochre Award	Awarded

== Further information ==
- Tasmanian Aboriginal shell necklace making tradition
