= Ruby Tjangawa Williamson =

Ruby Williamson
- Born: c. 1940; Kata Ala, Western Australia
- Died: September 2014 (aged 73–74)
- Occupation: Painter
- Years active: 2000 – 2014
- Organization: Tjala Arts
- Style: Western Desert art Wood carvings
- Children: 5

Ruby Tjangawa Williamson (c. 1940 – September 2014) was a Pitjantjatjara artist from Amaṯa, in central Australia. She made acrylic paintings and traditional wood carvings, and was one of the most successful artists from the region. Her paintings have attracted critical acclaim for her unusually modern style. Williamson painted sacred stories from the Dreamtime that have morals or lessons from her people's traditional law. She used the typical style of the Western Desert, but the techniques and imagery were more modern. Her style is said to be experimental.

== Early and personal life ==
Williamson was a member of the Pitjantjatjara nation. She was born about 1940, (Note: The exact year of her birth is not known. Most sources estimate that it is around 1940. The National Gallery of Australia puts it between 1938 and 1942.) at a sacred site near Kata Ala, Western Australia. She grew up with her family in the bushland along the western side of the border with South Australia. Her family spent most of their time travelling between her father's homeland near Pukara and her mother's around Mantamaru. When Williamson was a teenager, they followed other Pitjantjatjara families to settle at Ernabella, far to the east. Williamson grew up and went to school at the mission there until she got married.

Williamson's husband was a stockman whose family came from what is now Amaṯa, west of Ernabella. After they married, they moved north to Areyonga, where he worked on the cattle station. They later moved back to his homeland, where he got a job on the Musgrave Park station. They had five children together, before her husband died in his early 40s.

== Art and career ==
In 1999, the senior women of Amaṯa, including Williamson, founded Minymaku Arts (now Tjala Arts). Williamson began working there herself in 2000. Her first solo exhibitions were in Hobart in 2003 and 2005, and then in Melbourne in 2008. Her artwork has been shown alongside works by other Tjala artists in every major city in Australia. She has also had her work shown in group exhibitions in Singapore and the United States. Her work is held in the National Gallery of Victoria, the Art Gallery of South Australia, the Queensland Art Gallery, the National Gallery of Australia, and the Museum and Art Gallery of the Northern Territory. She died in 2014.

== More reading ==
- Williamson, Ruby (2008), Ruby Williamson: Australian Art and Artists file, State Library of Victoria
