= Lepidosperma canescens =

Scientific classification
- Kingdom: Plantae
- Clade: Tracheophytes
- Clade: Angiosperms
- Clade: Monocots
- Clade: Commelinids
- Order: Poales
- Family: Cyperaceae
- Genus: Lepidosperma
- Species: L. canescens

Binomial name
- Lepidosperma canescens Boeckeler
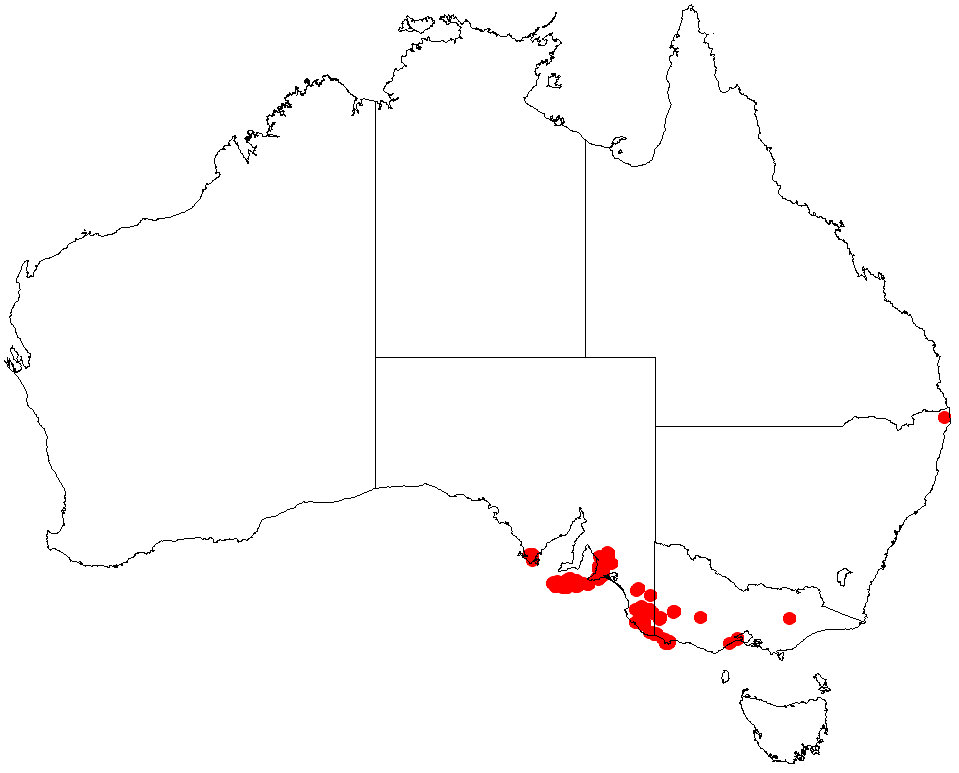
- Occurrence data from AVH

Species of plant

Lepidosperma canescens (common name hoary rapier-sedge) is a sedge of the family Cyperaceae that is native to south-east South Australia and Victoria. There are no synonyms.

== Description ==
Lepidosperma canescens is a clump-forming perennial with short rhizomes. It has terete, rigid, erect, and smooth culms which are 25–100 cm by 0.8–2.0 mm. The leaf-blades are similar to the culms but usually shorter and from 0.7–2 mm in diameter. The sheaths are yellow-brown to dark grey-brown, and are sometimes a dark reddish near the apex. They are not sticky. The inflorescences are fan-shaped to oblong. They are loose, erect, and 3–8 cm by about 2 cm. The involucral bract is shorter than the inflorescence. The spikelets are 5–7 mm long. The nut is obovoid (2–3 mm by 1.0–1.3 mm), and brown, smooth, and shining.

== Uses ==
This sedge was used by Aborigines for weaving artefacts, and is used by the aboriginal artist, Yvonne Koolmatrie, for her weaving.
