= Malya Teamay =

Australian aboriginal artist

- Born: 1947 (age 78–79); Curtin Springs, Northern Territory, Australia
- Occupations: • Artist at Walkatjara Art Uluṟu • Board member of Uluṟu-Kata Tjuṯa National Park
- Years active: 1985–present
- Organization: Maruku Arts
- Style: Western Desert art
- Children: Arnold Teamay (born 1971)

Malya Teamay is an Aboriginal Australian artist. He is also an administrator of Uluṟu-Kata Tjuṯa National Park, serving as a member of its Board of Management. As an artist, Teamay works for Walkatjara Art Uluṟu. This art centre is part of the Uluṟu–Kata Tjuṯa Cultural Centre located inside the national park. Examples of Teamay's paintings are held in the Queensland Gallery of Modern Art, and the Museum of Victoria.

Teamay was born in 1947, at Curtin Springs, a cattle station in the southwest of the Northern Territory. His family was Pitjantjatjara. He grew up at Uluṟu, Areyonga and Ernabella. He worked as a stockman for most of his early life. Teamay moved to Muṯitjulu after it was established in the mid-1980s. He began painting soon after, originally as a way of telling others about the history of his people. His first painting was about the problem of petrol sniffing. He has made several different versions of this painting since.

Like most other artists from this region, Teamay also paints the Tjukurpa associated with his country. These are stories about his spiritual ancestors from the Dreamtime and their journeys across the land. Teamay's paintings focus on the Seven Sisters, and the Liru and Kuniya Dreamings. His work Tjukurpa of Uluṟu is pictured on the admission tickets to the park. It depicts the spiritual law associated with Uluṟu. The other subjects he commonly paints are stories from the Australian gold rush, social problems faced by his community, and the effects of destructive habits on the environment.

Malya is a very active member of the Aboriginal community and has travelled widely around Australia to speak on Anangu issues. He has also served as the chairman of the Nyangatjatjara Aboriginal Corporation, which governs employment, educational and economic opportunities for Aboriginal people in the southwestern Northern Territory.
