= David Miller (painter) =

Pitjantjatjara artist

David Miller (born c. 1950), a senior Pitjantjatjara man, is an Australian artist.

His works are held in the collections of the Art Gallery of South Australia (Wati Tjakura Tjukurpa), the University of Canberra (Inarki), and the National Museum of Australia (Googarh).

Miller's work has been exhibited at Royal Museums of Fine Arts of Belgium (Aboriginalities, group).

His work, Goanna Songline (Ngintaka Inma), was projected onto the sails of the Sydney Opera House as part of the 2022 Australia Day Dawn Reflection.
