= Mavis Ngallametta =

Australian artist (1944–2019)

- Born: August 10, 1944
- Died: January 28, 2019 (aged 74)
- Known for: Painting, Weaving
- Movement: Australian Indigenous Art

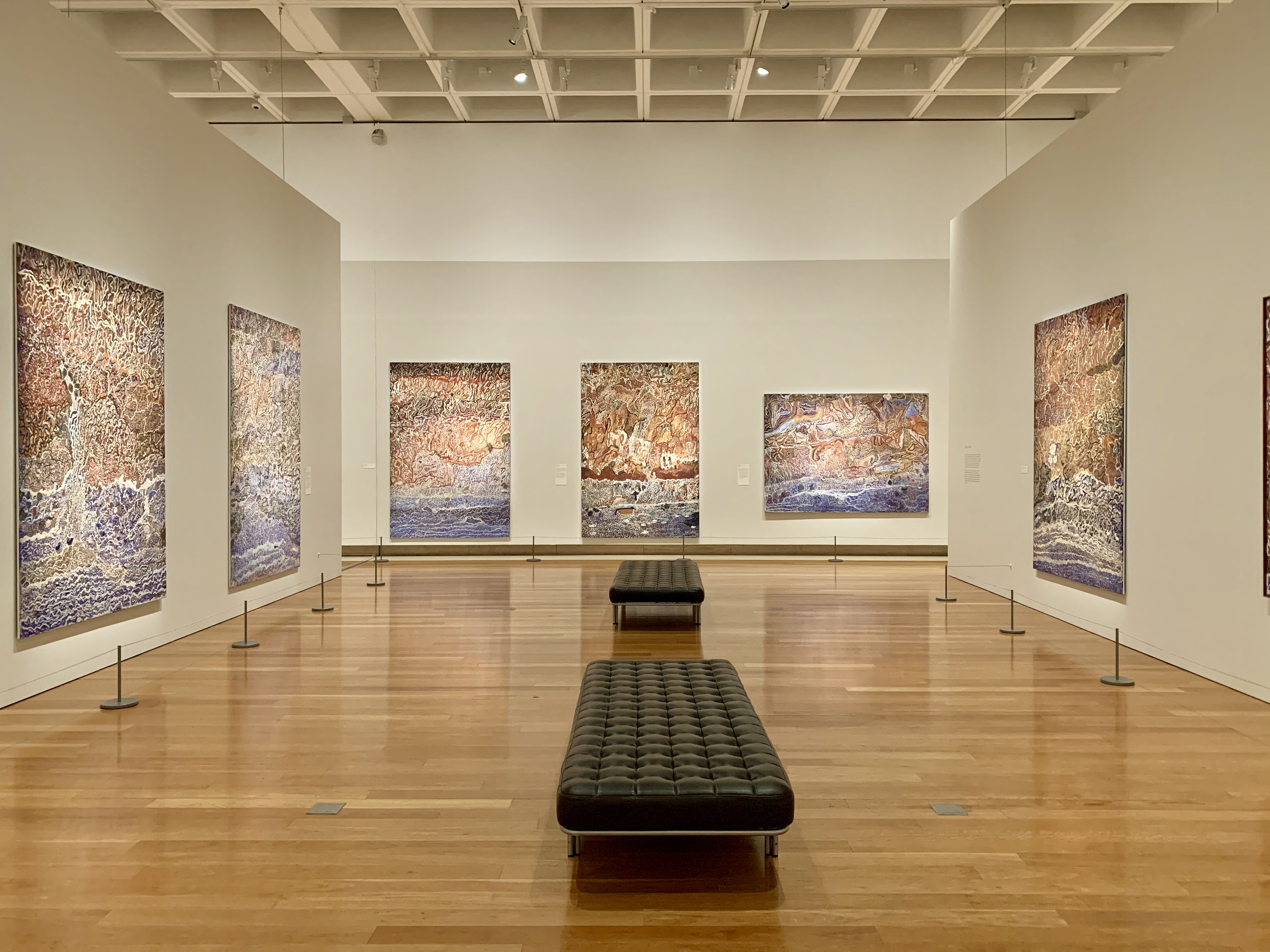
Mavis Ngallametta exhibition Show Me the Way to Go Home at Queensland Art Gallery, July 2020

Mavis Ngallametta (also known as Waal-Waal Ngallametta), née Marbunt, was an Indigenous Australian painter and weaver. She was a Putch clan elder and a cultural leader of the Wik and Kugu people of Aurukun, Cape York Peninsula, Far North Queensland. Her work is held in national and state collections, including the National Gallery of Australia, Canberra; Art Gallery of New South Wales, Sydney; Art Gallery of South Australia, Adelaide and Gallery of Modern Art, Brisbane.

== Early life and education ==
Ngallametta was removed from her family at the age of five and grew up in the dormitories of Aurukun Mission. She maintained connections with her family, learning to weave dilly bags and fruit bowls, made from cabbage palm and pandanus, from her mother and aunty.

== Career ==
Mavis Ngallametta was initially recognised for her mastery of weaving in traditional materials. While attending a workshop at the Wik and Kugu Art Centre, run by Gina Allain, she began making small paintings depicting important cultural sites. Larger paintings refer to the changing seasons as well as specific sites including Ikalath, where she collected the white clay Yalgamungken, for the vibrant local ochres; her traditional country, the coastal side of Kendall , which she was able to view from the air; Wutan, a camping site belonging to her adopted son Edgar; and various pamp, or swamps, around Aurukun. Ngallametta painted with traditional materials, including ochres, clays and charcoal, which she collected herself. Between 2011 and 2019, she created 46 monumental paintings. According to Sally Butler: "nearly every major public and private art collection in Australia" acquired one of these large-scale paintings between 2011 and 2014.

== Work ==
=== Major exhibitions ===
Queensland Art Gallery | Gallery of Modern Art is hosting the first major retrospective of Ngallametta's work in 21 March – 2 August 2020.

=== Public and private collections ===
- National Gallery of Australia, Canberra
- Art Gallery of New South Wales, Sydney
- Art Gallery of South Australia, Adelaide
- Queensland Art Gallery | Gallery of Modern Art, Brisbane
- Griffith University, Brisbane
- University of Queensland, Brisbane
- Parliament House Collection, Canberra (Bushfire at Ngak-Pungarichan, 2013)
- The Pat Corrigan Collection
- Holmes à Court Collection
- The Ray Wilson Collection
- The Kerry Stokes Collection
- The Wesfarmers Collection

=== Awards and nominations ===
- 2004 Community Arts Achievement Award, Western Cape College, Weipa, Queensland
- 2013 Telstra General Painting Award

=== Australia Council for the Arts ===
The Australia Council for the Arts is the arts funding and advisory body for the Government of Australia. Since 1993, it has awarded a Red Ochre Award. It is presented to an outstanding Indigenous Australian (Aboriginal Australian or Torres Strait Islander) artist for lifetime achievement.

Year	Nominee / work	Award	Result
2018	herself	Red Ochre Award	Awarded
