= Ngarra =

Ngarra (c.1920–2008) was an Aboriginal Australian artist of the Andinyin and Gija peoples, known for his paintings on canvas and paper which depicted his homelands in the Kimberley region of Western Australia, along with events from the ancestral and colonial past. Among Aboriginal people in the central and east Kimberley he was revered for his deep knowledge of Aboriginal ceremonial practices which he learned from his grandparents Muelbyne and Larlgarlbyne while living nomadically in the remote Mornington Range.

== Early life ==
Ngarra was born in 1920 on Glenroy Station in the west Kimberley. An orphan, he ran away from the station and went to live with his grandparents Muebyne and Larlgarbyne.

== Career ==
Ngarra started painting in 1994. His work was facilitated and documented by the anthropologist Kevin Shaw.

Ngarra's late paintings are defined by his use of vibrant colour contrast, which he achieved by mixing Ara acrylic paints to create his own palette. Ngarra's paintings contain many references to pre-colonial Aboriginal traditions. His works were exhibited at the Western Australian Museum in 2000, and some are held in the National Gallery of Victoria, the Art Gallery of Western Australia and Museum Victoria.

In 2015, sixteen of Ngarra's works were included in the exhibition No Boundaries: Aboriginal Australian Contemporary Abstract Painting. Organised by William Fox and Henry Skerritt for the Nevada Museum of Art, the exhibition toured to five museums across the United States. A tribute to the artist was included in the inaugural Tarnanthi exhibition in 2015 at the Art Gallery of South Australia.

== Collections ==
- Artbank
- Art Gallery of Western Australia
- Berndt Museum of Anthropology, University of Western Australia
- Edith Cowan University
- Kluge-Ruhe Aboriginal Art Collection of the University of Virginia
- Museum Victoria
- Redland City Art Gallery
- Western Australian Museum

== Significant exhibitions ==
- 2000: Ngarra, Images of His Country. Katta Djinoong Gallery, Western Australian Museum, Perth, Western Australia, Australia
- 2000: National Indigenous Heritage Award., Australian Heritage Commission, Canberra, Australian Capital Territory, Australia
- 2014: The World is Not a Foreign Land. Ian Potter Museum of Art, University of Melbourne, Melbourne, Victoria, Australia
- 2015 No Boundaries: Aboriginal Australian Contemporary Abstract Painting. Nevada Museum of Art, Reno, Nevada, USA
- 2015: Tarnanthi. Art Gallery of South Australia, Adelaide, South Australia, Australia.
