= Tjala Arts =

Aboriginal art centre in South Australia

Tjala Arts, formerly known as Minymaku Arts, is an Aboriginal Australian-owned and -managed arts centre located in the remote community of Amata in the Anangu Pitjantjatjara Yankunytjatjara Lands in the remote north-west of South Australia.

== History ==
Tjala Arts was started by women from Amata in 1997 and was originally called Minymaku Arts (meaning "Women's Arts"), until it was renamed in 2006 to better reflect the increasing involvement of men in the operation of the centre. Tjala is the Pitjantjatjara word for honey ant, which is both a traditional bush food and one of the creation stories for the Amata area.

== Description ==
Tjala Arts supports and showcases the work of local artists, including work from the homelands surrounding Amata, in the Musgrave Ranges.

Tjala Arts prioritises cultural strength and ownership. The collective believes the power in the art is "not for sale" and not for interpretation without their permission. This ownership is important to maintaining and building cultural strength and generating job and income. As senior artist Frank Young said: "Nganampa Art Nganana walytjanguku Business palyanu. Munula Tjukurpa kunpu kanyini - Our Art. Our Business. Keeps our culture strong".

Tjala artists use a variety of mediums, including acrylic paint on linen, punu (wood), tjanpi (fibre weaving; often in conjunction with Tjanpi Desert Weavers) and new media arts including photography, film and sound work. Tjala artists are known for their energetic work and rich colourful palette and, in their work, artists explore their Tjukurpa (Dreaming).

Tjala Arts is part of the APY Art Centre Collective.

Tjala artists have been acquired by many high-profile collectors and prestigious Australian cultural institutions including; The National Gallery of Australia, The Art Gallery of New South Wales, The National Gallery of Victoria and Art Gallery of South Australia.

== Artists ==
Artists represented by, or previously represented by Tjala Arts include:

- Freda Brady
- Hector Burton
- Nyurpaya Kaika Burton OAM
- Wawiriya Burton
- Rhonda Dick
- Ray Ken
- Sandra Ken
- Sylvia Ken
- Tjungkara Ken
- Barbara Mbitjana Moore
- Tiger Palpatja
- Maringka Tunkin
- Ruby Tjangawa Williamson
- Anwar Young
- Frank Young
- Yaritji Young
