= Watarru Indigenous Protected Area =

Indigenous protected area in South Australia

- IUCN category II (national park)
- Location within South Australia
- Location: South Australia
- Nearest city: Watarru
- Coordinates: 27°30′S 129°30′E
- Area: 13,925.23 km^{2} (5,376.56 sq mi)
- Established: 16 June 2000
- Governing body: Aṉangu Pitjantjatjara Yankunytjatjara Land Management
- Website: Official website

The Watarru Indigenous Protected Area is an Indigenous Protected Area in the north west corner of South Australia. It covers an area of 13,925 square kilometres (5,376 square miles) in the Great Victoria Desert. It is the traditional land of the Pitjantjatjara, Ngaanyatjarra and Yankunytjatjara peoples.

The area was made an Indigenous Protected Area in June 2000. It is managed by the Watarru community according to their traditional laws and practices, known as Tjukurpa. The environment has not been damaged by cattle grazing or other farming practices. The Anangu are working with scientists to develop ways of dealing with feral animals including cats, foxes and camels. It is classified as an IUCN Category II protected area.

== See also ==
- Protected areas of Australia
