= Kunmanara Stewart =

Pitjantjatjara artist

Kunmanara "Nellie" Stewart (c. 1938–2012), a senior Pitjantjatjara woman, was an Australian artist. She commenced painting later in life, and painted about Minyma Kutjara Tjukurpa, Two Women Creation Dreaming.

== Collections ==
Her works are found in the Queensland Art Gallery (Punu wara, and Minyma Kutjara), Artbank (Minyma Kutjara, and Minyma Kutjara), the Maroondah Federation Estate Gallery, the National Gallery of Victoria (Minyma Kutjara (Many women), and Minyma Kutjara (Two Sisters)), and the Corrigan Collection.

== Exhibitions ==
Stewart's work has been exhibited at Hazelhurst Regional Gallery and Arts Centre (group), the National Art Museum of China, and the University of Queensland Anthropology Museum.

She was a 2010 Western Australian Indigenous Art Award finalist.
