= Barbara Mbitjana Moore =

Barbara Mbitjana Moore (born 1964) is an Anmatyerre woman who grew up in Ti-Tree in the Northern Territory, moving later to Amata in South Australia's Anangu Pitjantjatjara Yankunytjatjara (APY) Lands. In April 2003, Moore began painting at Amata's Tjala Arts, and, since then, has received widespread recognition. Moore won a National Aboriginal & Torres Strait Islander Art Award in 2012 and has been a finalist in many other years. Moore has also been a finalist for the Wynne Prize.

== Biography ==
Moore was born in Ti-Tree in the Northern Territory. Raised in Amoonguna, she began attending Yirara College, a boarding school in Alice Springs, at the age of 13. In the middle of high school she moved north, back to her father's home country of Ti-Tree. There, she took a job as an Aboriginal Education Worker in a preschool. Moore would later marry, moving to Amata to live with her husband. In Amata, Moore began a new job as a healthcare worker. Serving first as a cleaner at the Amata Clinic, Moore later became a nurse's aid after completing three levels of training. She is now an Aboriginal Senior Health Worker for Nganampa Health, working at the Amata Clinic full-time in addition to her career as an artist. Moore is known to paint during much of available free time, including while on lunch break from work at the Clinic.

Moore cites family as an important motivator in her work and career. She describes that “for us, the role of an artist is a respected position. It’s one that our children and grandchildren look up to and one they aspire to be. I’m making a path for my children.” Moore is the mother of two children, a son and a daughter who are both married and living in Amata. She is also the grandmother to three grandchildren; Teresita, Hannah, and Darcy.

== Career ==
Moore began painting at Tjala Arts (formerly Minymaku Arts) in 2003, where she continues to paint on a daily basis. The Tjala Arts Center community has had a profound effect on Moore's career, and she cites the vibrant social and communal atmosphere as foundational to her practice. "It’s really good for us to be here," she notes, "working in the art center together. Doing all of this good work, sharing stories, laughing and talking.”

Moore paints large scale works to depict her country and its landscape. She mainly uses acrylic paints on linen, and screen printing, and is known for her vibrant and expressive use of colours and designs, particularly bright orange, pink, yellow, and green. For Moore, these colors are reflective of the richness of her natural environment, used to represent the vibrant colors found in flowers and trees of her country. Moore's work is also interested in the materiality of paint, using thick and expressive brushstrokes to "make the painting sing."

Moore titles all of her paintings "Ngayuku Ngura (My Country)". In the Pitjantjatjara language, the word Ngura describes both the physical geography of land and country, and the place to which someone belongs. It defines where an individual comes from, their family connections and language. Paintings of Ngura often express the artist's personal stories and memories of Country. Elements within the landscape such as tracks, landmarks, rock holes, underground springs, rock formations and sacred sites are recorded from memory, and often depicted from an aerial perspective.

In 2018, Moore, along with other artists from the Anangu Pitjantjatjara Yankunytjatjara (APY) Lands, opened a gallery in Darlinghurst, Sydney, with the intention of overcoming unethical practices by art dealers towards Indigenous artists.

== Significant exhibitions ==
- 2003 Minymaku Arts – Exhibition of Fabrics, Moore College of Art & Design, Philadelphia, USA
- 2007 Colours from our country, Harrison Galleries, Sydney, New South Wales, Australia
- 2012 Tjala 2012, Gallery Gabrielle Pizzi, Melbourne, Victoria, Australia
- 2012 APY All Stars, Short Street Gallery, Broome, Western Australia, Australia
- 2013 Tjukurpa nganampa kunpu kanyintjaku: Stories that keep culture strong, Aboriginal and Pacific Art, Sydney, New South Wales, Australia
- 2013 APY Lands survey exhibition, Outstation Gallery, Darwin, Northern Territory, Australia
- 2013 Desert Mob, Araluen Arts Centre, Alice Springs, Northern Territory, Australia
- 2014 Tjintu kuwaritja wiru mulapa, ReDot Gallery, Singapore
- 2015 Kwarila Tjunguringayi – All together now, Short Street Gallery, Broome, Western Australia, Australia
- 2015 Tjintu wiru – Beautiful day, Aboriginal and Pacific Art, Sydney, New South Wales, Australia
- 2017 Artists of the APY Lands, Alcaston Gallery, Melbourne, Victoria, Australia
- 2017 Sharing Country, Olsen Gruin Gallery, New York, United States of America
- 2017–18 Tarnanthi Festival of Contemporary Aboriginal and Torres Strait Islander Art, Art Gallery of South Australia, South Australia
- 2018 Art of the APY Art Centre Collective, Alcaston Gallery, Melbourne, Victoria, Australia
- 2019–20 Ngayulu Nguraku Ninti – The Country I Know: Barbara Moore & Sharon Adamson at the Kluge-Ruhe Aboriginal Art Collection of the University of Virginia

== Awards and nominations ==
- 2012 Winner – General Painting Award, 29th Telstra National Aboriginal and Torres Strait Islander Art Award
- 2013 Finalist, 30th Telstra National Aboriginal and Torres Strait Islander Art Award
- 2014 Finalist, 31st Telstra National Aboriginal and Torres Strait Islander Art Award
- 2015 Finalist, 32nd Telstra National Aboriginal and Torres Strait Islander Art Award
- 2016 Finalist, 33rd Telstra National Aboriginal and Torres Strait Islander Art Award
- 2016 Finalist, John Fries Award
- 2017 Finalist, Wynne Prize, Art Gallery of New South Wales, Sydney, New South Wales, Australia
- 2019 Finalist, Wynne Prize, Art Gallery of New South Wales, Sydney, New South Wales, Australia

== Residency ==
In November 2019, Moore and the artist Sharon Adamson, accompanied by Annie McLoughlin, manager of Tjala Arts, completed a two-week residency at the Kluge-Ruhe museum. The two artists painted a mural, titled "Ngayulu Nguraku Ninti", across two walls in the museum. The mural conveys the connections Moore and Adamson have to their homeland, and features elements typical of Moore's works including the use of thickly applied paint, bright red and radiating circles. The exhibition and residency were sponsored by the Australia Council for the Arts.

== Collections ==
Moore has collections in the Art Gallery of South Australia, Artbank, Corrigan Collection, the National Gallery of Australia and in the W&V McGeough Collection.
