= Ken Thaiday Snr =

Torres Strait Islander artist resident in Cairns, Australia

Ken Thaiday (born 1950), known as Ken Thaiday Snr, is an artist from Erub (Darnley Island), one of the Torres Strait Islands. He is known for his headdresses (dhari), masks, shark totems and kinetic sculptures, which connect to his island traditions and culture.

== Early life and influences ==
Thaiday was born in 1950 on Erub, of the Meriam Mir people of Torres Strait Island.

Thaiday's father, Tat Thaiday, was a cultural leader, choreographer, songwriter and gardener, and dhari played an important role in the traditional Torres Strait Islander ceremonies in Ken's youth. He has said that dance is very important to him, and that his father was one of the best choreographers.

Thaiday attended school on Thursday Island until he was fifteen, when he and his family settled in Cairns in Far North Queensland, Australia. He worked for Queensland Rail for over ten years, and also in the mining industry in the Pilbara in Western Australia. The experience in assembling and dissembling machinery later influenced his sculptures with moving parts.

== Beliefs and community activities ==
Thaiday leads and participates in many important community events in the Islands, such as The Coming of the Light as well as holding the position of Chairman for five years. He is deeply religious and attributes the inspiration for and development of his creative works to God. His works often feature painted depictions of Kernus, the landing place of the missionaries, and the church on Erub.

He has also mentored many Torres Strait Island artists, and passes on his knowledge and understanding of the sea and Islander traditions and culture, which includes connections with animals.

== Artwork and career ==
Thaiday returned to Cairns in the late 1980s and established the Loza Dance Group with other Torres Strait Islanders there, and began creating dance artefacts. In 1987, he began constructing "mobilised artefacts" for the Darnley Island Dance Troupe. The artefacts connect with traditions and clan identity.

He later started working in a more contemporary style, often using modern materials, such as plastic, plywood and paint, along with traditional materials such as bamboo and feathers. He is best known for his shark headdresses, as the shark is his totemic animal, in particular the hammerhead shark, or beizam. In Torres Strait Islander culture, some sharks are associated with law and order. His work also features native birds and fish. Some of his creations are articulated, allowing dancers to move parts of them.

In 2006 he spent three months at the Cité internationale des arts in Paris, France. In July 2009 he presented a Beizam mask to the Australian Embassy in Washington DC, and in the same year gave a talk at Kluge-Ruhe Aboriginal Art Collection at the University of Virginia in the US.

== Recognition and awards ==
=== Australia Council for the Arts ===
The Australia Council for the Arts is the arts funding and advisory body for the Government of Australia. Since 1993, it has awarded a Red Ochre Award. It is presented to an outstanding Indigenous Australian (Aboriginal Australian or Torres Strait Islander) artist for lifetime achievement.

| Year | Nominee / work | Award | Result |
|---|---|---|---|
| 2017 | himself | Red Ochre Award | Awarded |

In late 2016, Thaiday was awarded an honorary doctorate from the University of Sunshine Coast, as the "most distinctive artist of the Eastern Torres Strait".

In 2020 Thaiday featured as one of six Indigenous artists in the ABC TV series This Place: Artist Series. The series is a partnership between the Australian Broadcasting Corporation and the National Gallery of Australia, in which the producers travelled to the countries of "some of Australia's greatest Indigenous artists to share stories about their work, their country, and their communities".

== Exhibitions and gallery holdings ==
Thaiday's work has been showcased in over 50 exhibitions, in Australian and international galleries, including: Queensland Art Gallery; National Museum of Australia; Museum and Art Gallery of the Northern Territory; Musée des Confluences, France; National Gallery of Australia; Parliament House Art Collection in Canberra; Queensland Museum; Art Gallery of NSW; Museum of Archaeology and Anthropology, University of Cambridge, UK; Museum of Victoria; the Museum of Contemporary Art Australia in Sydney; and the Oceanographic Museum of Monaco.

In 2014, Thaiday presented a major installation, which included a huge sculpture and new dances, at Carriageworks in Sydney. In 2016 he collaborated on with Jason Christopher on a number of daris, for the Taba Naba exhibition at the Oceanographic Museum of Monaco. In the same year he was invited to exhibit in Sydney Biennale, for which he again collaborated with Christopher. His work was included in National Gallery's 3rd National Indigenous Art Triennial, Defying Empire, in 2017.
