= Tiger Tjalkalyirri =

Australian aboriginal guide and elder (c. 1906–1985)

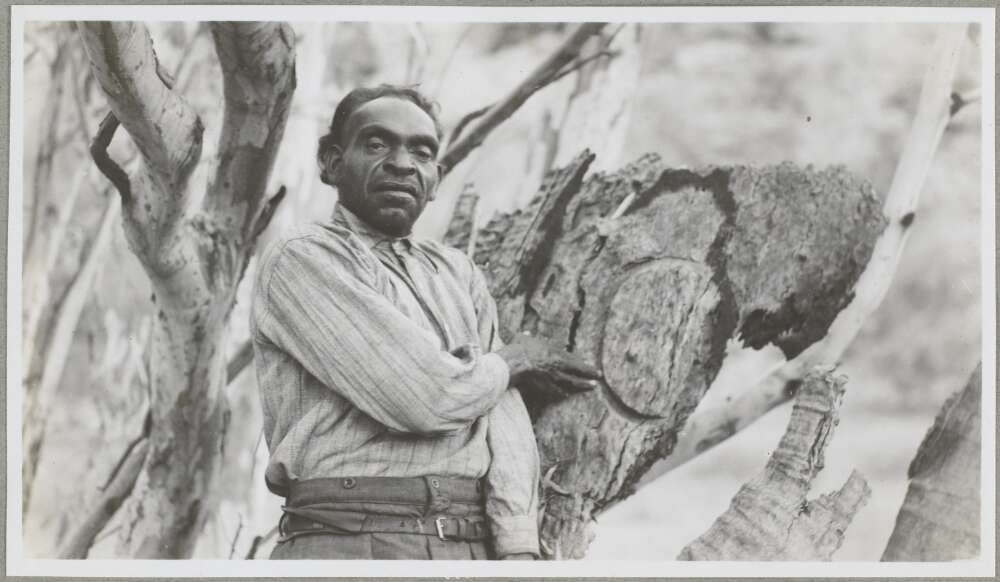
Tiger Tjalkalyirri in 1947

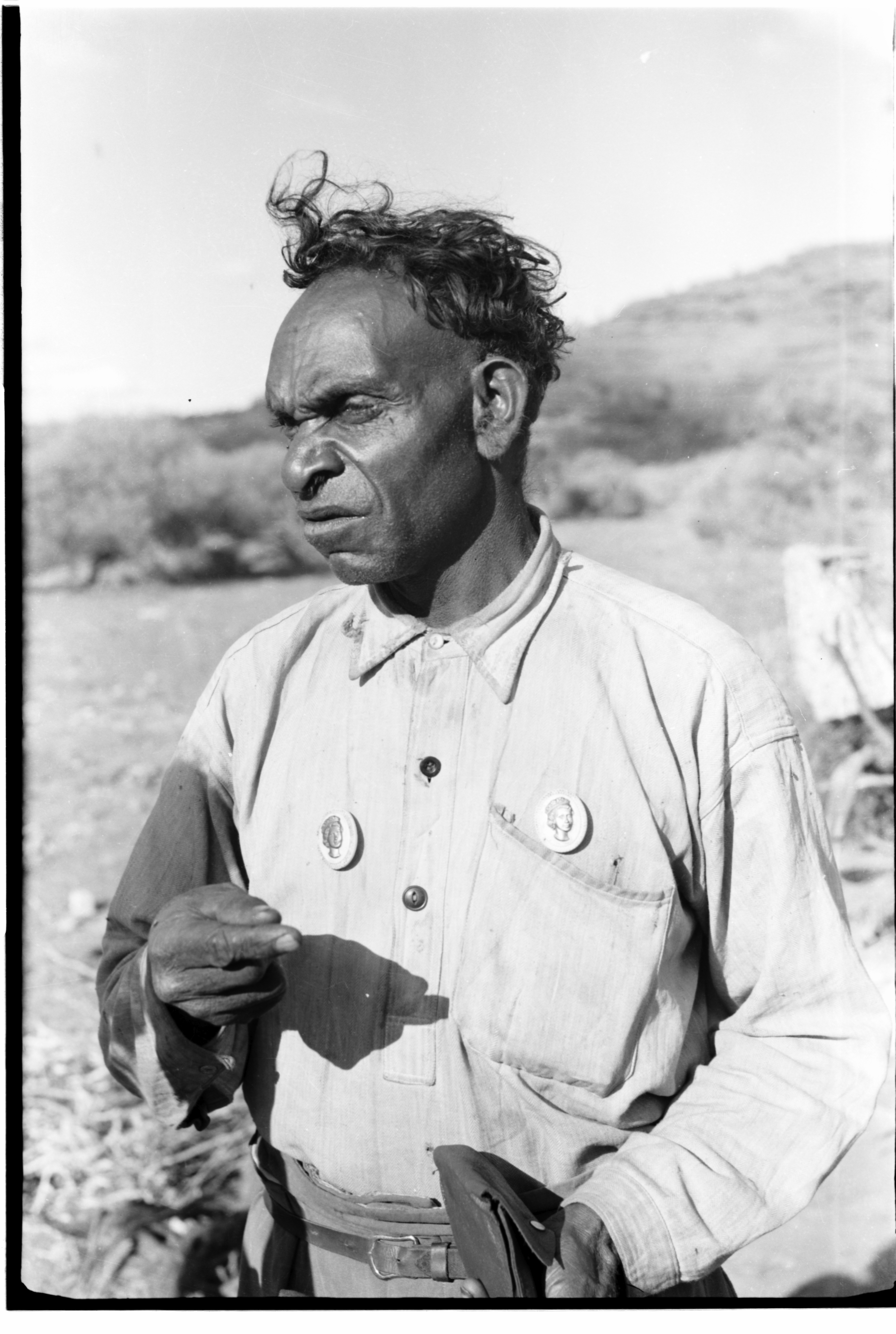
Tiger Tjalkalyirri, date unknown

Tiger Tjalkalyirri also known as Tiger Tjalkaljeri (c. 1906 – 2 June 1985) was a Pitjantjatjara man who was an Australian guide, elder and land-rights campaigner for his people; especially in relation to Uluṟu-Kata Tjuṯa National Park.

== Biography ==
Tjalkalyirri was born at Wintawata, near Amata, in the Aṉangu Pitjantjatjara Yankunytjatjara Lands. He was the second of three sons born to Kutunari and his second wife Antumara. His totem was the Nyintaka (Perentie).

In the early 1920s Tjalkalyirri migrated, with several family members, to Watarrka Country in the Northern Territory, where he had strong connections. In the mid-1920s he moved again to become a stockman on Henbury Station; here he learned to ride horses and camels and became noted for his tracking abilities. Based on these skills he was chosen as a guide for missionaries Ernest Eugene Kramer and John Henry Sexton on their 6000 km camel trek to take a census of Aboriginal people in the region. Tjalkalyirri's knowledge of Uluṟu prompted Kramer to observe that it was the ‘most sacred spot in all the country around’. This was some of the earliest recognitions of its significance to the Aṉangu people.

During a severe drought, between 1925 and 1932 Tjalkalyirri went to Hermannsburg Mission and it was here he first acquired the nickname 'Tiger'. Although he respected Christianity he did not adopt the faith as other members of his family, like his younger brother Pastor Peter Bulla, did. While there he worked as a stockman and also as a cameleer and dogger (dingo hunter). While at Hermannsburg Tjalkalyirri also helped linguists and anthropologists to understand Aṉangu culture and was respected for his knowledge of songs, dances and artefact manufacture.

He also played a significant role in tourism at Hermannsburg and Uluṟu and was remembered for greeting coach drivers to the mission and being a friendly face to greet visitors. He would dress in army surplus clothing, to which he added "ever-increasing badges and insignia".

Tjalkalyirri acted as an early guide and climbing partner to early visitors to Uluṟu including Arthur Groom in 1947; Groom referred to him as Talkajyerie. He is quoted in Groom's subsequent book saying:

This is one good country all the time. I live here - runabout - when little boy. Good country all together, Reedy Creek we call Lilly. Bagotty Spring we call Wynmurra. All good country. My country - go all the way across Lake Amadeus and Oolra and Kuttatuta. I take you and show you. Tomorrow we go 'cross desert? We take them ol' camella - plenty water canteen - we got good tucker - good! We go three, maybe four day, that away - right up lake country - right up Ayers Rock, we go!

— Tiger Tjalkalyirri, as quoted in "I saw a strange land: journeys in Central Australia" by Arthur Groom, 1959

He is considered one of the first climbing guides of the rock and is thought to have actively encouraged people to climb; this was used by some as evidence against the closure of the Uluṟu climb.

Tjalkalyirri played an active role in the 1960 centenary celebrations of John McDouall Stuart's first expedition and 'discovery' of Central Australia and, in 1967 participated in the Hermannsburg Choir tour led by Doug and Olga Radke. In the 1970s he also participated in the Yuendumu Games, at Yuendumu, which are sometimes referred to as the 'Aboriginal Olympics'.

In his later years Tjalkalyirri lived at Uluṟu where he demonstrated his spiritual responsibility for the lands surrounding it. He was present when, in November 1983, Prime Minister Bob Hawke promised that Uluṟu would be handed back to its traditional owners. He was a principal informant in the Uluṟu and Lake Amadeus Land Claims.

He died on 2 June 1985 in Alice Springs and was buried at Hermannsburg.

== Resources about ==
An oral history interview by Tjalkalyirri, recorded in 1975, is available through the National Library of Australia.

He is also recorded in various recordings available through AIATSIS in a series made by anthropologist Robert Layton in 1977.
