= Nyurpaya Kaika Burton =

Artist and educator

Nyurpaya Kaika Burton is an artist and educator from the Anangu Pitjantjatjara Yankunytjatjara Lands of Central Australia.

== Life ==
Nyurpaya Kaika Burton was born in 1949 at Atila near Mount Connor and grew up at Pukutja/Ernabella.

Burton's multidisciplinary practice spans painting, weaving and installation. She was also a teacher for 15 years and has been a Director of Amata Council, NPY Women's Council and a long-standing Director of Tjala Arts. She is also an advocate against unethical and unscrupulous art dealers. She continues to work at Tjala Arts in Amata community and is represented by the APY Art Centre Collective and Tjanpi Desert Weavers.

Burton was honoured with a Medal of the Order of Australia in 2020. She also won a First Nations Media award for her radio documentary Ngayulu manta pampura in 2020 and has been a finalist multiple times in the National Aboriginal and Torres Strait Islander Art Award.

Burton's work is held the collections of the National Gallery of Victoria and the Museum of Contemporary Art.
