= Johnny Bulunbulun =

Australian aboriginal artist

- Born: 1946; Arnhem Land, Northern Territory, Australia
- Died: 2010 (aged 63–64); Arnhem Land
- Known for: Painting, bark painting
- Spouse(s): 1-Nellie; 2- Laurie Maarbudug
- Awards: Red Ochre Award (2004); National Aboriginal & Torres Strait Islander Art Award (2001)

Johnny Bulunbulun (1946–2010) was an Aboriginal Australian artist.

== Life ==
Johnny Bulunbulun was born in 1946 in Arnhem Land, in the Northern Territory of Australia. He was a Ganalbingu man.

== Career ==
Bulunbulun was known for his paintings and bark painting.

== Death and posthumous exhibitions ==
Bulunbulun died in Arnhem Land in 2010.

He had a posthumous joint exhibition with Zhou Xiaoping in Beijing and Melbourne, called Trepang: China & the Story of Macassan - Aboriginal Trade.

== Awards ==
In 2004, the Red Ochre Award was awarded to Bulunbulun by the Australia Council for the Arts.

== Collections ==
- Artbank, Sydney
- Art Gallery of New South Wales, Sydney
- Art Gallery of Western Australia, Perth
- Central Collection, Australian National University, Canberra
- Djomi Museum, Maningrida
- Edith Cowan University Collection Perth Western Australia
- Flinders University Art Museum, Adelaide
- Holmes à Court Collection, Perth
- Kluge Foundation, Morven Estate, Charlottesville, Virginia, USA
- Milingimbi Collection, MECA, Milingimbi Educational and Cultural Association
- Museum and Art Gallery of the Northern Territory, Darwin
- Museum of Contemporary Art, Maningrida Collection, Sydney
- National Gallery of Australia, Canberra.
- National Gallery of Victoria, Melbourne.
- National Maritime Museum, Darling Harbour, Sydney
- Parliament House Art Collection, Canberra
- The Kelton Foundation, Santa Monica, USA
