= Dorothy Peters =

Indigenous Australian community leader and artist (1930–2019)

Dorothy Peters AM
- Born: 1930; Melbourne, Victoria, Australia
- Died: 2019 (aged 88–89)
- Other names: Dot Peters
- Occupation(s): artist and community leader

Dorothy Betsy Peters, AM (1930–2019) was an Australian indigenous community leader and artist. Peters was born in Melbourne in 1930, as the daughter of Vincent and Daisy Peters. She died in 2019.

== Career ==
The following list of positions held and awards given is as shown on Peters' Member of the Order of Australia Media Note.

Indigenous Affairs
   Chair, Victorian Aboriginal Remembrance Committee, since 2007.
   Board Member, Healesville and District Hospital, 1991-1994.
   Past Member, Aboriginal Advisory Committee, Yarra Valley Community Health Service.
   Founding Member, Gumeril Aboriginal Health Service.
   Past Chair, Aboriginal Education Consultative Committee, 1990s.
   Member, Aboriginal Advisory Committee, Yarra Ranges Shire Council.
   Founder, Yarra Valley Aboriginal Elders Association.
   Past Member, Healesville Police Liaison Committee.
   Past Member, Healesville Indigenous Arts Enterprise Co-operative.
Healesville Indigenous Community Services Association
   Honorary Elder and Inaugural Life Member.
   Past Board Member.
   Founding Member, 2009. 
Swinburne University of Technology
   Advisory Establishment Committee Member, Oonah Learning Centre and Balluk Yilam Learning Centre.
   Member of the Swinburne Wurreker Committee, and Australian Indigenous Consultative Assembly, 17 years.
Community
   President, Healesville RSL Ladies Auxiliary, 2 years.
   Life Member, Healesville Tennis Club.
Professional
   Artist (Weaver), Traditional Basket Coiling and Culture Workshops, 1970-2012.
   Aboriginal Educator, Healesville Primary School, 1980-1991, Lilydale Secondary College, and various organisations.
Awards and recognition includes:
   Member, Victorian Aboriginal Honour Roll, since 2011.
   Member, Victorian Honour Roll of Women, since 2011.
   Red Ochre Award (outstanding senior female artist), Australia Council for the Arts, 2002, 'for her work in preserving and teaching the art of basket coiling in Victoria'.
   Elders Award, Eastern Metropolitan Region, NAIDOC, 2010, 1999.
   Centenary Medal, 2001.
   Meritorious Service, Department of Veterans Affairs, for establishing the annual Victorian Indigenous Veterans Remembrance Service at the Shrine of Remembrance.
   Yarra Ranges Shire Council, Lifetime Achievement Award

== Honours and awards ==
- 2002 Red Ochre Award
- 2002 Victorian Aboriginal Women's Award
- 2001 Centenary Medal for For outstanding community support to the indigenous community of Healesville
- 2011 Inducted into the Victorian Aboriginal Honour Roll
- 2019 Member of the Order of Australia for For significant service to the Indigenous community of Victoria.
