= Red Ochre Award =

Lifetime achievement award for Indigenous Australian artists

- Awarded for: Lifetime achievement award for Indigenous Australians in the arts
- Country: Australia
- Presented by: Australia Council for the Arts
- Reward: $50,000
- First award: 1993; 33 years ago
- Website: National Indigenous Arts Awards

The Red Ochre Award is an annual art award for Indigenous Australian artists.

== Background and description ==
The Red Ochre Award was established in 1993 by the Australia Council for the Arts.

It is awarded annually to an outstanding Indigenous Australian (Aboriginal Australian or Torres Strait Islander) artist for lifetime achievement. As of 2022 is one of four categories awarded at the First Nations Arts Awards (formerly National Indigenous Arts Awards) on 27 May each year.

== Recipients ==
=== 2020s ===
- Bronwyn Bancroft (2026)
- Djambawa Marawili (2026)
- Hetti Kemarre Perkins (2026)
- Stephen Pigram (2026)
- Deborah Cheetham Fraillon (2025)
- Lionel Fogarty (2025)
- Shellie Morris (2025)
- Lily Shearer (2025)
- Uncle Badger Bates (2024)
- Aunty Mabel Juli (2024)
- Uncle Bob Weatherall (2023)
- Aunty Sandra Hill (2023)
- Stephen Page AO (2022)
- Destiny Deacon (2022)
- Yorna (Donny) Woolagoodja (2021)
- Dr Lou Bennett AM (2021)
- Alison Milyika Carroll (2020)
- Djon Mundine OAM (2020)

=== 2010s ===
- Jack Charles (2019)
- Lola Greeno (2019)
- Mavis Ngallametta (2018)
- John Mawurndjul AM (2018)
- Lynette Narkle (2017)
- Ken Thaiday Snr (2017)
- Yvonne Koolmatrie (2016)
- Dr Gary Foley (2015)
- Hector Burton (2014)
- David Gulpilil AM (2013)
- Warren H. Williams (2012)
- Archie Roach (2011)
- Michael Leslie (2010)

=== 2000s ===
- Gawirrin Gumana AO (2009)
- Doris Pilkington Garimara AM (2008)
- (2007)
- Tom E. Lewis (2006)
- Seaman Dan (2005)
- Johnny Bulunbulun (2004)
- Jimmy Little (2003)
- Dorothy Peters AM (2002)
- Banduk Marika AO (2001)
- Mervyn Bishop (2000)

=== 1990s ===
- Justine Saunders OAM (1999)
- Bob Maza AM (1998)
- Jimmy Chi (1997)
- Maureen Watson (1996)
- The Mills Sisters (1995)
- Mick Namarari Tjapaltjarri (1994)
- Eva Johnson (1993)
