= Tomkinson Ranges =

Mountain range in South Australia

Coordinates: 26°11′27″S 129°07′31″E

Location in South Australia

The Tomkinson Ranges is a mountain range in the northwest corner of South Australia. The range consists of sandstone hills, surrounded by spinifex grasslands. The range was named after politician Samuel Tomkinson (1816–1900) by the explorer William Gosse in the early 1870s. Ernest Giles and his team reached the ranges shortly after, and established a base from which to explore the Gibson and Great Victoria Deserts. Numerous prospecting expeditions were made through the region until the 1930s.

Together with the Mann Ranges, the Tomkinson Ranges are an important part of the Aṉangu Pitjantjatjara Yankunytjatjara lands. The communities of Kalka and Pipalyatjara are located at the base of the mountains.
