= Yvonne Koolmatrie =

Australian artist (born 1944)

- Born: 1944 (age 81–82); Wudinna, South Australia
- Known for: Weaving
- Awards: Red Ochre Award; 2016; South Australian Ruby Awards – South Australian Premier’s Award for Lifetime Achievement; 2015

Yvonne Koolmatrie (born 1944) is an Australian artist and weaver of the Ngarrindjeri people, working in South Australia.

== Early life ==
Koolmatrie was born in Wudinna, Eyre Peninsula, South Australia. Her father was a Kokatha man, Joseph Roberts, and her mother Margaret was a Ngarrindjeri / Ramindjeri woman from the Coorong. Koolmatrie grew up in Meningie and the Coorong region, later moving to the Riverland town, Berri.

== Career ==
Koolmatrie learned her craft in the early 1980s from elder and weaver, Dorothy Kartinyeri. Their coiled bundle technique uses local spiny-headed sedge (Cyperus gymnocaulos), known to the artist as bilbili and river rushes, and Koolmatrie is credited with saving the traditional Ngarrindjeri craft. Koolmatrie is defiant in using her practice to dismantle the colonial myth that Ngarrindjeri culture and weaving practices are extinct. Her work stands as a testimony that the practice is alive and continuing. Her weavings include eel traps, turtles, mats, bowls and models of biplanes. She was excited by the potential offered by woven sedge grass and this was seen, by Stephen Gilchrist as having "freed her imagination to breathe life into the fantastic woven articulations that are now her trademark". Koolmatrie work is influenced by Janet Watson's woven works monoplane (1942) and bi-plane (1942) in the South Australia Museum, Watson is an Australian indigenous woman who learn't weaving from her family.

Her works are included in many major galleries including the National Museum of Ethnology in Osaka, Japan; South Australian Museum; National Museum of Australia; Art Gallery of Western Australia; National Gallery of Victoria; and National Gallery of Australia.

In 1997, she was selected to represent Australia at the 47th Venice Biennale with Judy Watson and Emily Kame Kngwarreye. In 2016 she was awarded the Red Ochre Award, peer-assessed recognition.

In 2017, Koolmatrie was represented in the third national Indigenous Art Triennial, Defying Empire, four of her woven works were included. River Dreaming (2012) was previously acquired by the National Gallery of Australia in 2016.

== Honours and recognition ==
=== Australia Council for the Arts ===
The Australia Council for the Arts is the arts funding and advisory body for the Government of Australia. Since 1993, it has awarded a Red Ochre Award. It is presented to an outstanding Indigenous Australian (Aboriginal Australian or Torres Strait Islander) artist for lifetime achievement.

| Year | Nominee / work | Award | Result |
|---|---|---|---|
| 2016 | herself | Red Ochre Award | Awarded |

- 2015 South Australian Premier’s Award for Lifetime Achievement
- In 2020 Koolmatrie featured as one of six artists in the ABC TV series This Place: Artist Series. The series is a partnership between the Australian Broadcasting Corporation and the National Gallery of Australia, in which the producers travelled to the countries of "some of Australia's greatest Indigenous artists to share stories about their work, their country, and their communities".
- 2020-2021 National Gallery of Australia's Know My Name – "an initiative of the National Gallery of Australia to celebrate the significant contributions of Australian women artists"

== Works and exhibitions ==
- 1997 Eel trap, sedge rushes (Lepidosperma canescens), in Art Gallery of New South Wales
- 2015 Tarnanthi (Art Gallery of SA)
- 2000 Beyond The Pale (Adelaide Biennial)
- 2000 Festival of the Dreaming (Sydney Olympics)
- 1997 Off Shore: Onsite (Casula Powerhouse Arts Centre)
- 1991 Two Countries (Tandanya)
- 1990 Look At Us Now: South Australian Aboriginal Artists (Tandanya National Aboriginal Cultural Institute)
- 1989 Ngarrindjeri Basketry and Painting (JamFactory, Adelaide)
- 1987 Ngarrindjeri Art and Craft (South Australian Museum)
