= David Lindsay (explorer) =

Australian explorer and surveyor

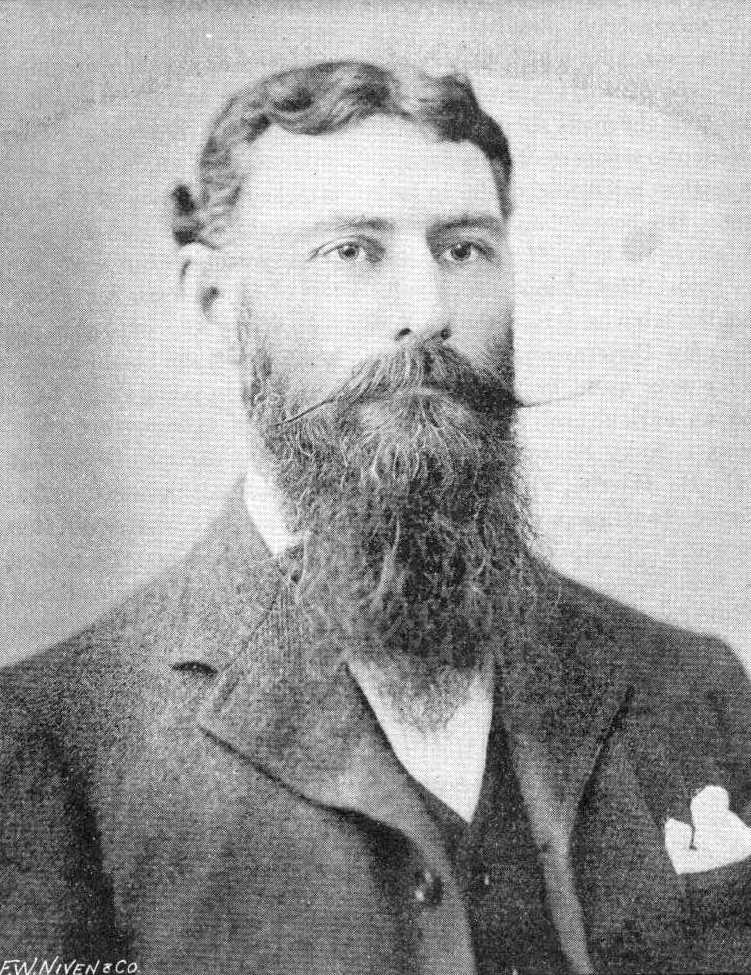
- Born: 20 June 1856; Goolwa
- Died: 17 December 1922; Darwin
- Occupations: Explorer, surveyor

David Lindsay (20 June 1856 – 17 December 1922) was an Australian explorer and surveyor and a fellow of the Royal Geographical Society, London.

== Early life ==
Lindsay was born in Goolwa, South Australia, a son of Captain John Scott Lindsay (ca.1819 – 29 June 1878), master mariner formerly of Dundee, Scotland, and his wife Catherine, née Reid (ca.1822 – 28 May 1884). John Lindsay commanded the brig Europa and Sir James Fergusson's yacht Edith before a career on Murray River steamers which included a pioneering trip to Brewarrina with W. R. Randell in 1859. Young Lindsay was educated in Goolwa and under Rev. John Hotham at Port Elliot. At age 15 Lindsay went to work in a chemist shop and then with an Adelaide mining agent.

== Explorer ==
In 1893, Lindsay overlanded camels to Coolgardie after news of gold discoveries there, and sold them at a profit.

Lindsay made a number of observations on indigenous tribes' cultures and languages during all his explorations and survey expeditions, in particular The Elder Scientific Exploration Expedition of 1891 and the Explorations in the Northern Territory of South Australia (including the Arnheim (sic) Land exploration).

The scope of the Elder Scientific Expedition, funded by Sir Thomas Elder, included recording fauna, flora, geological structures and climate, mapping the territory, potential for pastoral development, recording original indigenous place names, languages and pronunciation, avoiding conflict with indigenous tribes and to investigate the disappearance of Ludwig Leichhardt.

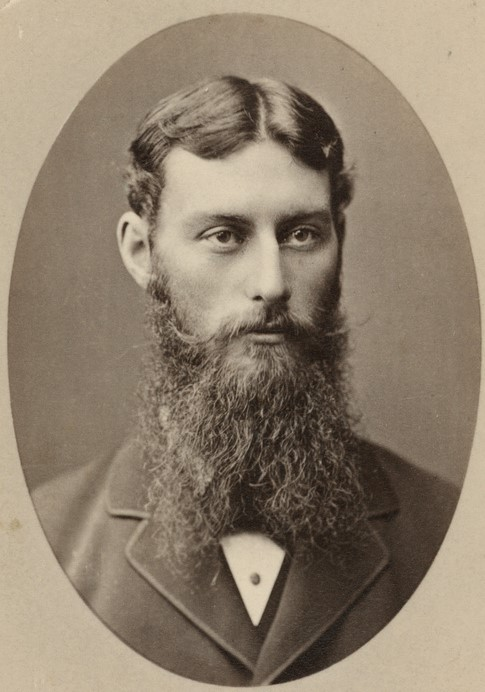

The expedition occurred during a period of extensive drought. Aided by indigenous people, water was not only sourced but evidence of water harvesting and management of evaporation through shoring up water sources with rocks and branches was observed. Indigenous people were somewhat alarmed at how much camels drank – 44 camels needed 800 gallons of water every few days. Lindsay also noted the extent of burning of the land and the constant presence of smoke observed on the horizon. The mallee scrub had been 'burnt in vast patches' possible a year or two previously' and burnt ground had better feed for the camels than unburnt land.

Lindsay’s Brief Notes on the Aborigines met with by the Elder Expedition of 1891-2, describes differences in physique among different tribes, the reluctance of women and children to interact with the white men although indigenous men interacted variously in friendly or hostile ways. Harvesting water was observed by indigenous tribes excavating conglomerate rocks and after rainfall enlarging the hole until a well was formed with capacity of 300–500 gallons of water.

Lindsay also observed indigenous living conditions in particular on the Northern Territory expedition. Lindsay records a 'solitary mia-mia (temporary shelter) formed of bamboo thickly thatched with grass, 6 ft high 10 ft in diameter ..with one entrance...so small I had the greatest difficulty in squeezing through it...the natives told me that when occupied, the entrance was stopped up with grass to keep out mosquitoes. It was used at the beginning of the wet season (to gather) wild fowls eggs and a stopping place from one route to another during the wet season' Lindsay also observes 'manufacture of rope and string out of fibre plants. Baskets are woven so closely as to be water tight' . Communication was also swift with one communication of the 'murder of a white man...conveyed over 200 miles in less than twenty-four hours'. Lindsay believed that the Northern Territory could support extensive pastoral ground and in Arnheim (sic) Land gold, silver, copper and tin had already been discovered.

In Mr Lindsay’s Explorations through Arnheim’s Land 1884, Lindsay notes the use of fishing: 'saw a native fishtrap made of “ supple jack" woven like a basket, 18 ft long and gradually tapering from 3 ft wide at its mouth, leaving at one side a hole to which the mouth of the reap is fixed. As the ride goes in or out the fish coming with it find a barrier, then with a rush, they go through what they suppose to be an opening, but which is in reality a trap, with a blackfellow at the other end ready to pop them into his basket as they come through the hole'. In general, however, the expedition in Arnhem Land was fraught with hostility between indigenous people and white people. It appears that Lindsay was reluctant at first to engage in hostilities which he encountered especially around Castlereagh Bay, the Roper River and in the locality of the Wornunyan Woorie. 'Were I to go there again I would shoot the first blackfellow I saw'.

== Later life ==
Lindsay married Annie Theresa Stuart Lindsay on 10 March 1881. She was a daughter of (unrelated) Arthur Lindsay, longtime Superintendent of Adelaide Destitute Asylum. She survived him with four sons and a daughter.
