= Kalka, South Australia =

Kalka South Australia
- Coordinates: 26°6′45″S 129°9′11″E
- Population: 92 (2016 census)
- Postcode(s): 5710
- Elevation: 598 m (1,962 ft)
- Location: 700 km (435 mi) by road southwest of Alice Springs
- LGA(s): Anangu Pitjantjatjara Yankunytjatjara
- State electorate(s): Giles
- Federal division(s): Grey
Mean max temp	Mean min temp	Annual rainfall
37.2 °C; 99 °F	6.8 °C; 44 °F	284.2 mm 11.2 in

Kalka is an Aboriginal community in the Anangu Pitjantjatjara Yankunytjatjara Lands in South Australia administered under the Anangu Pitjantjatjara Yankunytjatjara Land Rights Act 1981.

At the 2016 Australian census, Kalka had a population of 92. The community uses many of the facilities at nearby Pipalyatjara.

== Time zone ==
Due to its links with the Northern Territory and proximity to the border, the APY Lands do not observe daylight savings, unlike the rest of South Australia. The time zone observed throughout the year is Australian Central Standard Time (UTC+9:30), in line with Darwin rather than Adelaide.

== Geography ==
Kalka is situated in the far northwest of South Australia, right alongside the Gunbarrel Highway. The Kalka community is just kilometres from the Surveyor-General's Corner (the intersection of the South Australia, Western Australia and Northern Territory borders). The community of Pipalyatjara is situated 15 kilometres away by road, on the south side of the mountain ridge of which Kalka sits on the north. Kalka is situated at the foot of the Tomkinson Ranges.

== Climate ==
Based upon the climate records of the Giles Weather Station, which is across the border and slightly to the northwest in Western Australia, Kalka experiences summer maximum temperatures of an average of 37.2 degrees Celsius in January and a winter maximum average temperature of 19.9 degrees Celsius in July. Overnight lows range from a mean minimum temperature of 23.5 degrees in January to 6.8 degrees in June.

Annual rainfall averages 284.2 millimetres.

== Population ==
At the 2016 Australian census, Kalka had a population of 92. The median age was 25 years old.

Fifteen years earlier, the 2001 Australian Census indicated a total population of 139, with 90.6% being Indigenous Australians.

== History ==
According to PY Media:

Kalka Community is the administrative and residential centre for Pitjantjatjara Homelands Council. PHC is an incorporated Aboriginal organisation that exists to further the social, economic, political and cultural interests of its members. PHC was born out of the Aboriginal homelands movement of the 1970s when Anangu left the missions and government settlements to the east and west and returned to their traditional country. Many Anangu had been brought into or were attracted into these settlements during the 1950s and 1960s when the Australian Government ran the Maralinga atomic bomb tests and Woomera rocket tests. Kalka was originally planned as a resource centre for surrounding homelands but by the early 1990s it had developed into a small Aboriginal community with the full range of housing, infrastructure and service needs.

The settlement was funded by the federal government as an outstation (homeland) during the 1980s.

== Facilities ==
Kalka Community has an unsealed airstrip. None of the roads within the community are sealed, though work to seal the roads was scheduled for completion by mid-2007.

A fortnightly truck brings fresh, frozen and dry groceries and other freight to the community.

There is no school or health clinic at Kalka, both services of which are supplied from nearby Pipalyatjara.

A Technical and Further Education (TAFE) facility provides education on running a store or office, computer and Internet use. The TAFE also assists students in getting their driver's licence.

The Kalka community also has a small community store (said to be the only Anangu-run store on the APY Lands), a craft facility, children's playground, basketball court, administrative office and mechanic garage.

The South Australian Department for Aboriginal Affairs and Reconciliation (DAARE) provide many essential services.

Essential services support comes via Pipalyatjara.

Kalka does not have a permanent police presence. South Australian police are based at Marla and run patrols in the area. Unlike other communities on the APY Lands, no community constable is based at Kalka.

A mobile polling booth visits nearby Pipalyatjara for elections every 4 years to elect the Parliament of South Australia.

A permit is required for a member of the public to visit any community on the APY Lands, as they are freehold lands owned by the Aboriginal people.
