= Pipalyatjara, South Australia =

Town in Australia

Pipalyatjara
- Town
- Coordinates: 26°9′46″S 129°10′12″E
- Country: Australia
- State: South Australia
- LGA: Anangu Pitjantjatjara Yankunytjatjara
- Location: 550 km (340 mi) southwest of Alice Springs

Government
  - State electorate: Giles
  - Federal division: Grey
- Elevation: 652 m (2,139 ft)

Population
  - Total: 159 (SAL 2021)
- Postcode: 0872

Pipalyatjara (formerly Mount Davies) is an Aboriginal community in the Anangu Pitjantjatjara Yankunytjatjara Lands in South Australia, comprising one of the six main communities on "The Lands" (the others being Amata, Pukatja, Kaltjiti, Indulkana, and Mimili). Other smaller communities include Nyapari, Kanpi, Kalka and Yunyarinyi. The residents are mainly Anangu who speak Pitjantjatjara as their first language.The closest community is Kalka to the west.

== Time zone ==
Due to its links with the Northern Territory and proximity to the border, the APY Lands do not observe daylight savings unlike the rest of South Australia. The time zone observed throughout the year is Australian Central Standard Time (UTC+9:30), in line with Darwin rather than Adelaide.

== Geography ==
Pipalyatjara is situated approximately 550 kilometres (340 mi) south-west of Alice Springs on the Gunbarrel Highway, an unsealed road. Pipalyatjara is approximately 30 kilometres (19 mi) from the junction of the South Australian, Western Australian and Northern Territory borders (known as the Surveyor-General's Corner).

The community of Kalka is situated some 15 kilometres (9.3 mi) away (by road, on the north side of the mountain ridge to which Pipalyatjara lies to the south). Both communities are located within the Tomkinson Ranges.

Kunytjanu is an outstation and waterhole to the south, serviced from Pipalyatjara. It is located on the road between Pipalyatjara and Watarru.

== Climate ==
As of 2014, based upon the climate records of the nearest weather station, the Giles Weather Station, just across the border and slightly to the northwest in Western Australia, Kalka experiences summer maximum temperatures of an average of 37.2 degrees Celsius in January and a winter maximum average temperature of 19.9 degrees Celsius in July. Overnight lows range from a mean minimum temperature of 23.5 degrees in January to 6.8 degrees in June.

Annual rainfall averages 284.2 millimetres (11.19 in).

== History ==
Little is known about how the traditional owners and other peoples came to have a settlement at what is now known as Pipalyatjara.

Pipalyatjara was formerly known as Mount Davies, named after the tallest local peak.

The settlement was funded as an outstation during the 1980s.

Chrysoprase was mined at Pipalyatjara until recently.

== Facilities ==
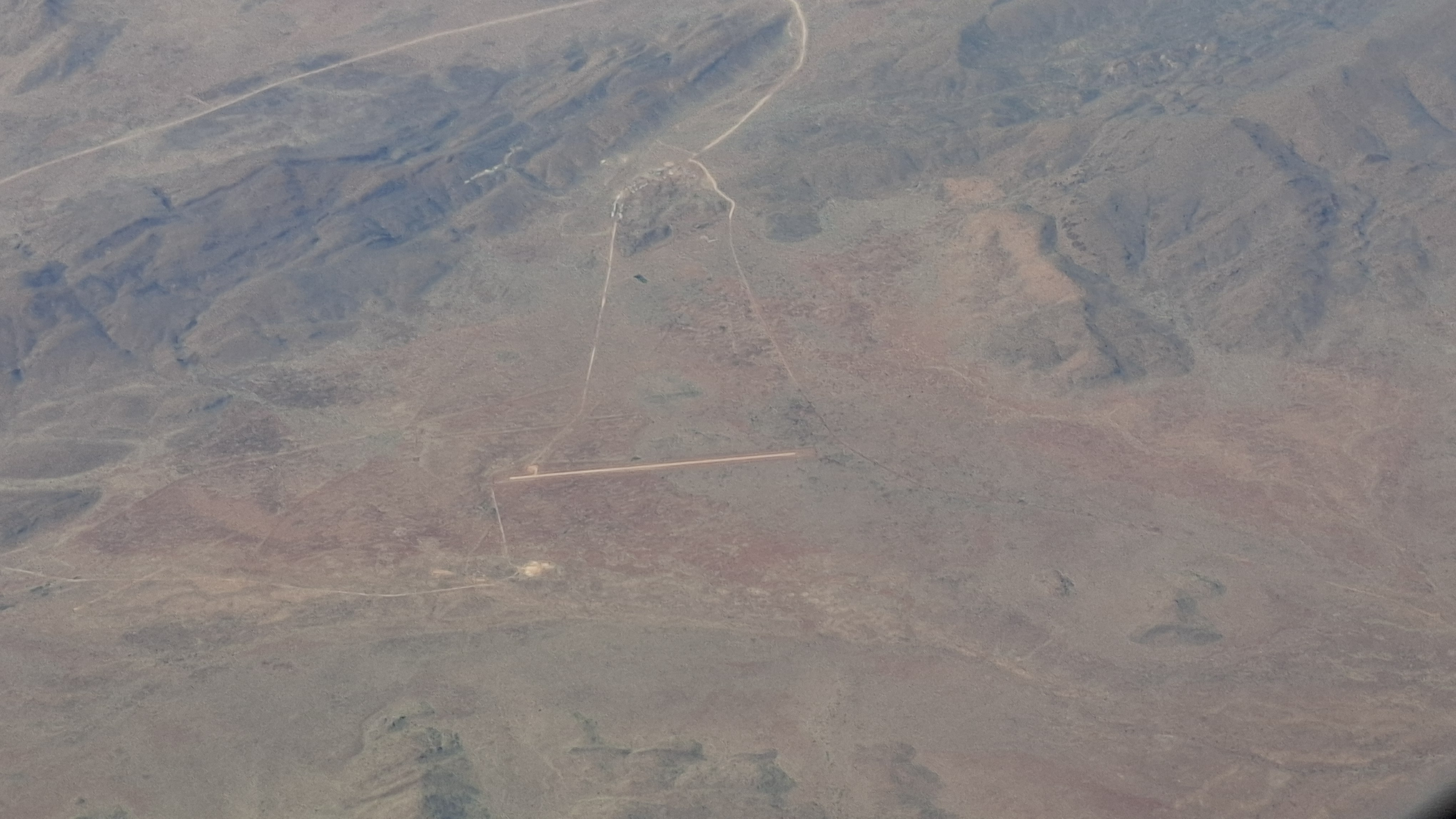
The airstrip connecting Pipalyatjara

A general store provides for both the Pipalyatjara and Kalka communities.

As of 2007, South Australia Police were based at Murputja, South Australia and running patrols in the area. There was a rudimentary shed structure that serves as a police station when police are present. As of 2020 a new, permanent policing complex is being built at Umawa. It will accommodate officers with specialist response capabilities, as well provide a base for a mobile unit which will be deployed in Fregon/Kaltjiti, Indulkana and Pipalyatjara. The service will work closely with child protection service agencies address child abuse and family violence issues. The 2019–2020 Government of South Australia agency budget estimates the completion date as June 2021, with a total spend of A$4.28 million.

Diesel power generation facilities supply power to both Pipalyatjara and Kalka. Water for the power station is supplied by SA Water.

The Pipalyatjara Anangu School serves both Pipalyatjara and Kalka Community.

The swimming pool reopened around 2024 after a period of closure, after much needed upgrades, including new rescue and safety equipment as well as new staff.

The community-run Ninuku Arts project supports artists from Pipalyatjara and Kalka.

As with most APY settlements, Australian Broadcasting Corporation and Special Broadcasting Service television are available.

There is an unsealed airstrip.

A mobile polling booth visits Pipalyatjara every four years for elections of the Parliament of South Australia.

A permit is required for a member of the public to visit any community on the APY Lands, as they are freehold lands owned by the Aboriginal people.
