= Pitjantjatjara =

Aboriginal people of Central Australia

Aṉangu
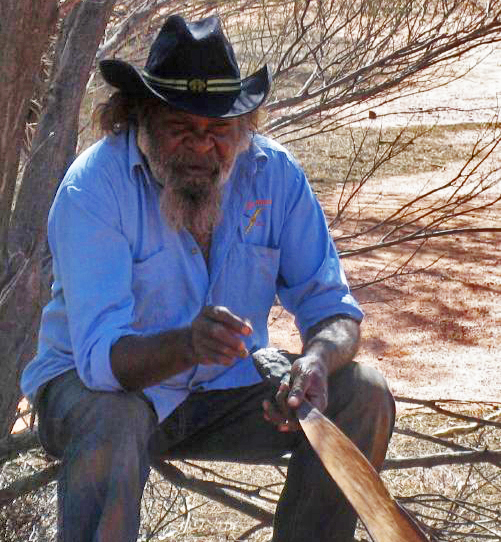
- Pitjantjatjara ranger at Uluru

Regions with significant populations
- Central Australia: c. 4,000

Languages
- Pitjantjatjara; English (Australian English, Australian Aboriginal English)

Religion
- Traditional, Christianity

Related ethnic groups
- Ngaanyatjarra, Yankunytjatjara

The Pitjantjatjara (/ˌpɪtʃəntʃəˈtʃɑːrə/; Pitjantjatjara: [ˈpɪɟanɟaɟaɾa] or [ˈpɪɟanɟaɾa]) are an Aboriginal Australian people, originating from the Central Australian desert near Uluru, Australia. They are closely related to the Yankunytjatjara and Ngaanyatjarra people. Their languages are, to a large extent, mutually intelligible (all are varieties of the Western Desert language).

They refer to themselves as Aṉangu people. The Pitjantjatjara live mostly in the northwest of South Australia, extending across the border into the Northern Territory to just south of Lake Amadeus, and west a short distance into Western Australia. The land is an inseparable and important part of their identity; every part of it is rich with stories and meaning to the Aṉangu.

== Pronunciation ==
The ethnonym Pitjantjatjara is usually pronounced (in normal, fast speech) with elision of one of the repeated syllables -tja-, thus: pitjantjara. In more careful speech all syllables will be pronounced.

== Etymology ==
The name Pitjantjatjara derives from the word pitjantja, a nominalised form of the verb "go" (equivalent to the English "going" used as a noun). Combined with the comitative suffix -tjara, it means something like "pitjantja-having" (i.e. the variety that uses the word pitjantja for "going"). This distinguishes it from its near neighbour Yankunytjatjara which has yankunytja for the same meaning. This naming strategy is also the source of the names of Ngaanyatjarra and Ngaatjatjarra but in that case the names contrast the two languages based on their words for "this" (respectively, ngaanya and ngaatja). The two languages Pitjantjatjara and Yankunytjatjara may be grouped together under the name Nyangatjatjara (indicating that they have nyangatja for "this") which then contrasts them with Ngaanyatjarra and Ngaatjatjarra.

== Language ==
Pitjantjatjara language is used as a general term for a number of closely related dialects which together, according to Ronald Trudinger were "spoken over a wider area of Australia than any other Aboriginal language". It shares an 80% overlap in vocabulary with Yankunytjatjara.

== Some major communities ==
See WARU community directory for a complete list

- in South Australia type 2
  - in the Anangu Pitjantjatjara Yankunytjatjara, including:
    - Pukatja
    - Amata
    - Kalka
    - Pipalyatjara
  - Yalata
  - Oak Valley
- In the Northern Territory
  - Kaltukatjara
  - Areyonga
  - Mutitjulu
- In Western Australia
  - Wingellina also called Irruntju

== History ==
From 1950 onwards, many aṉangu were forced to leave their traditional lands due to British nuclear tests at Maralinga. Some aṉangu were subsequently contaminated by the nuclear fallout from the atomic tests. Their experience of issues of land rights and native title in South Australia has been unique. After four years of campaigning and negotiations with government and mining groups, the Pitjantjatjara Land Rights Act 1981 was passed on 19 March 1981, granting freehold title over 103,000 km^{2} (40,000 mi^{2}) of land in the northwestern corner of South Australia.

=== Recognition of sacred sites ===
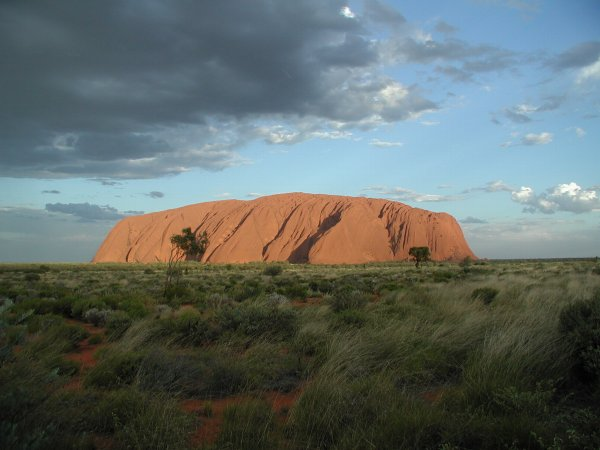
Pitjantjatjara people (Anangu) live in the area around Uluru / Ayers Rock and south to the Great Australian Bight.

The sacred sites of Uluru / Ayers Rock and Kata Tjuṯa / Mount Olga possess important spiritual and ceremonial significance for the Anangu with more than 40 named sacred sites and 11 separate Tjukurpa (or "Dreaming") tracks in the area, some of which lead as far as the sea. Uluru / Ayers Rock and Kata Tjuta / Mount Olga are separated from the Pitjantjatjara lands by the border between the Northern Territory and South Australia and have become a major tourist attraction and a national park.

== Notable people ==
- Gordon Briscoe, an Aboriginal scholar and activist
- Ian Abdulla, an author and artist
- Trevor Adamson, a country/gospel singer
- Tiger Tjalkalyirri, an elder and guide
- Anmanari Brown, a pioneering artist
- Hector Burton, an artist
- Wawiriya Burton, an artist
- Angkaliya Curtis, an artist
- Malpiya Davey, also known as Irpintiri Davey, an artist known for ceramic works
- Jimmy James OAM, a tracker
- Rene Kulitja, an artist
- David Miller, an artist
- Dickie Minyintiri, an artist
- Tiger Palpatja, an artist
- Walter Pukutiwara, an artist
- Kunmanara Stewart, an artist
- Tjunkaya Tapaya, a batik artist
- Malya Teamay, an artist and Uluṟu-Kata Tjuṯa National Park management board member
- Wingu Tingima, an artist
- Tony Tjamiwa, also known as Tony Curtis, a traditional healer and storyteller
- Harry Tjutjuna, an artist
- Yannima Tommy Watson, an artist
- Ginger Wikilyiri, an artist
- Ruby Tjangawa Williamson, an artist
- Nipper Winmarti, Aboriginal tracker and Traditional Owner of Uluru
- Bart Willoughby, a musician noted for his pioneering fusion of reggae
- Frank Yamma, an early proponent of singing Western-style songs in Pitjantjatjara
- Isaac Yamma, a country singer
- Harold Allison, initiated as a member of the Pitjantjatjara shortly after becoming Minister of Aboriginal Affairs

== See also ==
- Wiltja, a shelter made by the Pitjantjatjara people and other indigenous Australian groups

== Sources ==
- Bates, Daisy (1918). "Aborigines of the West Coast of South Australia; vocabularies and ethnological notes". Transactions of the Royal Society of South Australia. 42. Adelaide: 152–167 – via BHL.
- Berndt, Ronald M. (September 1941). "Tribal Migrations and Myths Centring on Ooldea, South Australia". Oceania. 12 (1): 1–20. doi:10.1002/j.1834-4461.1941.tb00343.x. JSTOR 40327930.
- Duguid, Charles (1972). Doctor and the Aborigines. Rigby. ISBN 0-85179-411-4 – via Internet Archive.
- Fry, H. K. (June 1934). "Kinship in Western Central Australia". Oceania. 4 (4): 472–478. doi:10.1002/j.1834-4461.1934.tb00123.x. JSTOR 27976165.
- Glass, Amee; Hackett, Dorothy (1979). Ngaanyatjarra texts. New Revised edition of Pitjantjatjara texts (1969). Canberra: Australian Institute of Aboriginal Studies. ISBN 0-391-01683-0 – via Internet Archive.
- Goddard, Cliff (1985). A Grammar of Yankunytjatjara. Institute for Aboriginal Development Press. ISBN 0-949659-32-0.
- Goddard, Cliff (1996). Pitjantjatjara/Yankunytjatjara to English Dictionary. Alice Springs: IAD Press. ISBN 0-949659-91-6.
- Goddard, Cliff (2010). "Pitjantjatjara/Yankunytjatjara". In Brown, Keith; Ogilvie, Sarah (eds.). Concise Encyclopedia of Languages of the World. Elsevier. pp. 871–876. ISBN 978-0-080-87775-4.
- Hilliard, Winifred M. (1976) [First published 1968]. The People in Between: The Pitjantjatjara People of Ernabella. Seal Books. ISBN 0-7270-0159-0. (reprint)
- Isaacs, Jennifer (1992). Desert Crafts: Anangu Maruku Punu. Doubleday. ISBN 0-86824-474-0.
- Kavanagh, Maggie (1990). Minyma Tjuta Tjunguringkula Kunpuringanyi: Women Growing Strong Together. Ngaanyatjarra, Pitjantjatjara, Yankunytjatjara Women's Council 1980–1990. ISBN 0-646-02068-4.
- Kimber, R. G. (1986). Man from Arltunga. Carlisle: Hesperian Press. chapter 12.
- "Maralinga Tjarutja Land Rights Act 1984". Government of South Australia, Attorney-General's Department.
- Tame, Adrian; Robotham, F.P.J. (1982). MARALINGA: British A-Bomb Australian Legacy. Melbourne: Fontana / Collins. ISBN 0-00-636391-1.
- Tindale, Norman Barnett (1974). "Pitjandjara (SA)". Aboriginal Tribes of Australia: Their Terrain, Environmental Controls, Distribution, Limits, and Proper Names. Australian National University Press. ISBN 978-0-708-10741-6.
- Toyne, Phillip; Vachon, Daniel (1984). Growing Up the Country: The Pitjantjatjara struggle for their land. Penguin Books. ISBN 0-14-007641-7.
- Trudinger, Ronald M. (March 1943). "Grammar of the Pitjantjatjara Dialect, Central Australia". Oceania. 13 (3): 205–223. doi:10.1002/j.1834-4461.1943.tb00381.x. JSTOR 40327992.
- Wallace, Phil; Wallace, Noel (1977). Killing Me Softly: The Destruction of a Heritage. Melbourne: Thomas Nelson. ISBN 0-17-005153-6.
- "WARU community directory".
- Woenne-Green, Susan; Johnston, Ross; Sultan, Ros; Wallis, Arnold (1993). Competing Interests: Aboriginal Participation in National Parks and Conservation Reserves in Australia - A Review. Fitzroy, Victoria: Australian Conservation Foundation. ISBN 0-85802-113-7.
