= Nyapari =

Nyapaṟi
- Town
- Coordinates: 26°10′36″S 130°13′14″E
- Country: Australia
- State: South Australia
- LGA: Aṉangu Pitjantjatjara Yankunytjatjara
- Location: 450 km (280 mi) south-west of Alice Springs; 100 km (62 mi) west of Amaṯa; 115 km (71 mi) east of Pipalyatjara
- Established: mid-1970s

Government
  - State electorate: Giles
  - Federal division: Grey
- Elevation: 668 m (2,192 ft)

Population
  - Total: 85 (2011 census)
- Postcode: 5710
- Mean max temp: 38 °C (100 °F)
- Mean min temp: −5 °C (23 °F)
- Annual rainfall: 200–250 mm (7.9–9.8 in)

Nyapaṟi is an Aboriginal community in the Aṉangu Pitjantjatjara Yankunytjatjara Lands in South Australia. It is located about 20 km (12 mi) south of the Northern Territory border at the base of the Mann Ranges. The nearby community of Kanpi is 15 km (9.3 mi) to the west.

There are about 50–100 people living there, including a small number of piranpa (non-Aboriginal) people. The residents are mostly Pitjantjatjara people. Nyapaṟi began as a family outstation by the Stevens family, who moved here to look after the country of their ancestors. Today it is a fully established community of extended families. It serves as an administration centre for nearby outstations Ulkiya and Tankannu.

Because both Nyapaṟi and nearby Kaṉpi are small communities, there are only basic services and most of them are shared between the two towns. In Nyapaṟi, there is an art centre and a health clinic. Supplies are delivered once every two weeks, and mail is delivered once per week. The community store is in Kaṉpi.

Both Kaṉpi and Nyapaṟi had their own schools from 1987, but these merged in 1993. The new school, Murputja Education Centre, was built between the two communities, 6 km (3.7 mi) east of Nyapaṟi and 9 kilometres (5.6 mi) west of Kaṉpi.

The Tjungu Palya art centre at Nyapari supports the development of a number of artists, some of whom have had work exhibited in Darwin, Singapore, Alice Springs, Melbourne and Switzerland, as well as in Tarnanthi at the Art Gallery of South Australia in Adelaide in 2017. The centre is one of ten Indigenous-owned and -governed enterprises that go to make up the APY Art Centre Collective, established in 2013.

== Time zone ==
Due to its links with the Northern Territory and proximity to the border, the APY Lands do not observe daylight savings unlike the rest of South Australia. The time zone observed throughout the year is Australian Central Standard Time (UTC+9:30), in line with Darwin rather than Adelaide.
