= Watarru =

Watarru Community South Australia
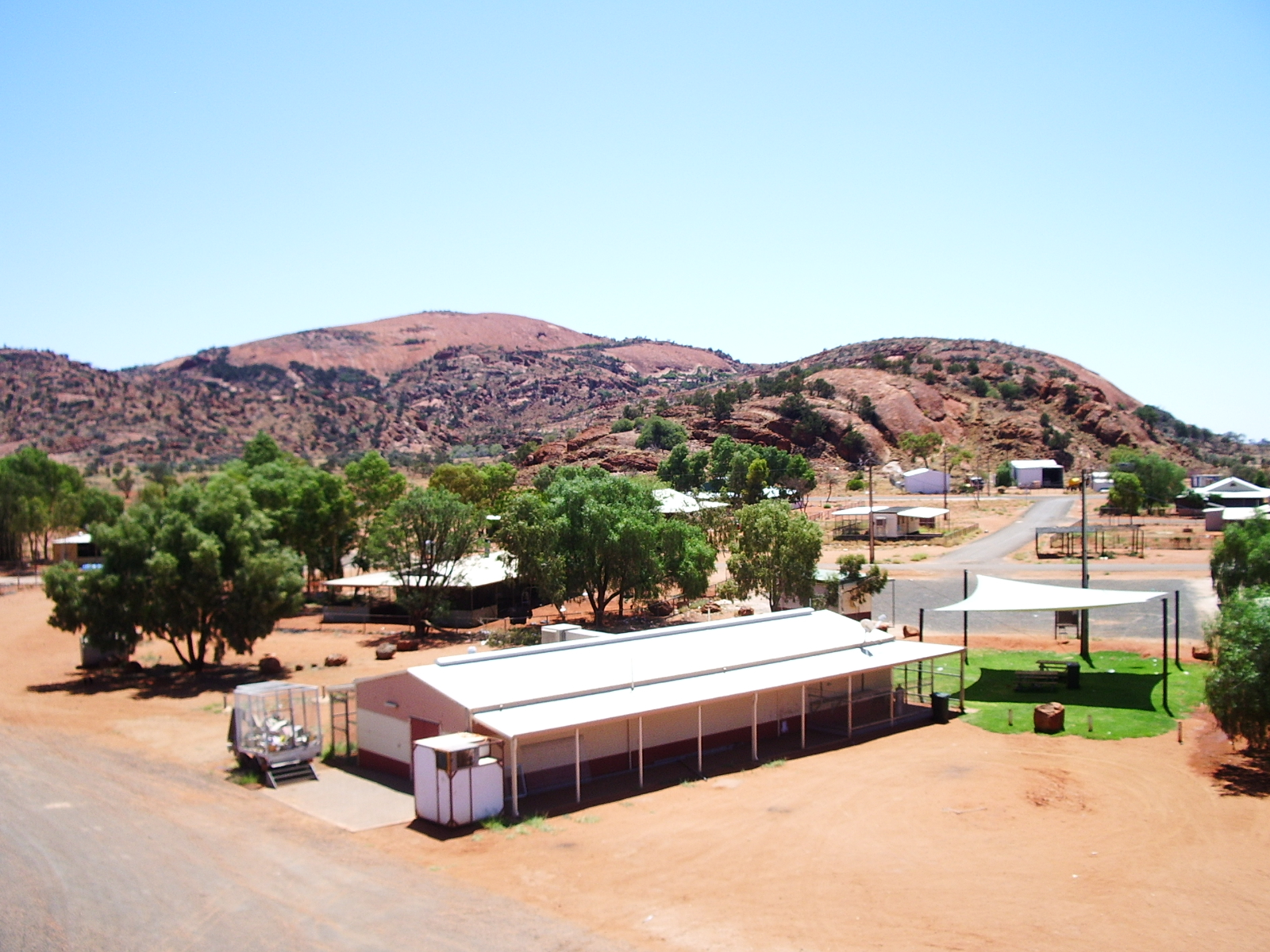
- Watarru Community buildings with wind farm in background courtesy of Appropriate Energy

- Coordinates: 27°16′1″S 129°39′20″E
- Population: 56 (2001 census)
- Established: circa 1980s
- Postcode(s): 0872
- Location: 550 km (342 mi) southwest of Alice Springs; 2,000 km (1,243 mi) northwest of Adelaide
- LGA(s): Anangu Pitjantjatjara Yankunytjatjara
- State electorate(s): Giles
- Federal division(s): Grey
Mean max temp	Mean min temp	Annual rainfall
37.2 °C; 99 °F	6.8 °C; 44 °F	284.2 mm 11.2 in

Watarru Community is an Aboriginal community in the Anangu Pitjantjatjara Yankunytjatjara (APY) lands in South Australia (one of a number of communities or homelands on "The Lands"; others include Amata, Ernabella/Pukatja, Fregon/Kaltjiti, Indulkana, Kalka and Mimili). Watarru Community sits at the foot of Mount Lindsay and the community has at times been known as "Mount Lindsay".

== Time zone ==
Due to its links with the Northern Territory and proximity to the border, the APY Lands do not observe daylight savings unlike the rest of South Australia. The time zone observed throughout the year is Australian Central Standard Time (UTC+9:30), in line with Darwin rather than Adelaide.

== Geography ==
Watarru Community is situated approximately 550 kilometres south-west of Alice Springs. Watarru is situated at the foot of Mount Lindsay, in the Great Victoria Desert. Watarru Community is situated within the Watarru Indigenous Protected Area, which as of June 2001 was the largest sized Declared Indigenous Protected Area (12,800 km^{2}, declared 1 September 2000).

== Climate ==
Based upon the climate records of the nearest weather station, at Giles across the border and to the northwest in Western Australia, Watarru experiences summer maximum temperatures of an average of 37.2 degrees Celsius in January and a winter maximum average temperature of 19.9 degrees Celsius in July. Overnight lows range from a mean minimum temperature of 23.5 degrees in January to 6.8 degrees in June.

Annual rainfall averages 284.2 millimetres.

== Population ==
Watarru Community's population was 56 people according to the 2001 Census, with 82.1% of those being Indigenous Australians.

The power station was constructed to cater for a fluctuating population of between 30 and 90 people.

The residents are mainly Anangu people.

== History ==
PY Media website waru.org reports:

The Community began to flourish in the early 1990s, after being established by a small family group of Anangu who had returned from other established Communities.

== Facilities ==
PY Media website "waru.urg" states:

The local store is provided with fresh produce by road train once a week, a local workshop provides limited services, but only diesel and avgas fuels are available. Persons with petrol driven vehicles are advised to check with their mechanic regarding the use of Avgas in their vehicle.

There is a weekly mail delivery by air from Alice Springs on friday; general freight is delivered weekly by road train.

Since the introduction of non-sniffable fuel throughout central Australia, Watarru has stocks of suitable unleaded fuel for cars. Avgas is no longer available.

Watarru has a community office for administration purposes, which also provides an Internet service and a place for co-ordinating the local arts project.

Management of the land provides employment opportunities for the Watarru community, managing and monitoring native fauna populations whilst also rounding up, shooting or culling pest species such as camels, foxes and feral cats.

The Watarru Anangu school was opened in 1986 and has approximately 25 students.

Watarru no longer has an operational medical clinic and does not have a permanent police presence. South Australian police are based at Marla and run patrols in the area. The community has no Indigenous community constables.

Electricity is provided to the community using a combination of solar power and a wind turbine, with the energy stored in batteries. Power is also generated by two diesel generators.

As with most APY settlements, Australian Broadcasting Corporation and Special Broadcasting Service television are available. Watarru also receives the Seven Network affiliated station Golden West Network from Western Australia, as well as Imparja television. Subscription television service Austar is also available to residents.

Residents can vote in elections for the Parliament of South Australia at a booth that visits Pipalyatjara.

A permit is required for a member of the public to visit any community on the APY lands, as they are freehold lands owned by the Aboriginal people. Entry to any APY community without a permit is an offence, and harsh penalties apply.
