= Walter Pukutiwara =

Aboriginal Artist from Central Australia

- Born: c. 1930 near Uluṟu, Northern Territory, Australia
- Died: 10 November 2004 (aged 73–74); Alice Springs
- Occupations: Sculptor, craftsman, painter
- Years active: 1980–present
- Organization: Maṟuku Arts
- Style: Pokerwork, Western Desert art
- Spouse: Topsy Tjulyata
- Children: Rene Kulitja

Walter Pukutiwara (c.1930 – 10 November 2004) was an Aboriginal artist from central Australia.

He crafted traditional tools, such as spears and spear-throwers, and wooden sculptures, known in Western Desert languages as puṉu. He made these by carving the wood and then engraving patterns (walka) into its surface with a burning wire. This technique is called pokerwork. The patterns engraved into the objects depict Tjukurpa, spiritual stories about creation ancestors from the Dreamtime. The National Museum of Australia contains many examples of Walter's works.

Walter was born just south of Uluṟu, Northern Territory, some time around 1930. The place where he was born is associated with the Wayuṯa Tjukurpa, and so the wayuṯa (brushtail possum) is his personal totem. Walter grew up living a traditional way of life in the bush with his family. When he was a young man, he went to live at the mission in Ernabella, South Australia. He worked there with sheep, as a shepherd and shearer. He married Topsy Tjulyata, and the couple moved to Amaṯa. Walter, as the Pitjantjatjara representative on the Aboriginal Arts Board (AAB) from 1976 to 1978 (later the Aboriginal and Torres Strait Islander Arts Board), lobbied the board for money to support art and crafts in Amaṯa. As a result, the craft centre at Amaṯa was established in February 1981.

Later in 1981, Walter and Topsy went to Uluṟu and set up a tent at the base of Uluṟu. From there they sold their puṉu works to tourists for over two weeks. They did this trip with other artists from Amaṯa, including Tony Tjamiwa and Pulya Taylor, and their friends Peter Yates and Patricia D'Arango. In 1983, this group travelled around to artist communities in the Aṉangu Pitjantjatjara Yankunytjatjara Lands. This was to discuss the idea of setting up a new craft centre at Uluṟu that would sell artworks from around the region to tourists. The couple moved to Muṯitjulu so that they could help set up Maṟuku Arts, in 1984. Water and Topsy were some of the first artists for the centre. Walter served on the organisation's Governing Committee for 20 years, including as chairman many times.

In the early 1990s, he helped to set up Aṉangu Tours, the main tour operator in Uluṟu-Kata Tjuṯa National Park, out of his wish to share knowledge and culture. His daughter, Rene Kulitja, and son-in-law, Richard Kulitja, took over the company when Walter retired, and it later won an international heritage and culture award.

Walter died on 10 November 2004, in Alice Springs.
