= Pulya Taylor =

Australian artist

- Born: 1931 (age 94–95); Walytjatjata, Northern Territory
- Occupations: Sculptor, craftswoman
- Years active: 1980–present
- Organization: Maṟuku Arts
- Style: Pokerwork
- Spouse: Tony Tjamiwa (died May 2001)

Pulya Taylor (born 1931) is an Aboriginal artist from central Australia. She makes wooden objects, known in the Western Desert as puṉu. She makes these by carving the wood and then engraving patterns (walka) into its surface with a burning wire. This technique is called pokerwork. The wood she uses is sourced locally from the area around Uluṟu, where she lives.

Taylor was born and grew up around Walytjatjata, in the southwest corner of the Northern Territory. She began working in arts and crafts at Ernabella in the late 1940s. She later moved to Amaṯa with her husband, Tony Tjamiwa. In 1983, Taylor and Tjamiwa, together with Topsy Tjulyata, Walter Pukutiwara, Peter Yates and Pat D'Arango, travelled around artist communities in the Aṉangu Pitjantjatjara Yankunytjatjara Lands. This was to discuss the idea of setting up a new craft centre at Uluṟu, which would sell artworks from around the region to tourists. The couple moved to Muṯitjulu so that they could help set it up. Taylor was one of the first artists for Maṟuku Arts, and she is still an executive member.

Taylor is probably best known for her sculptures of animals, such as birds, numbats, snakes, the echidna, and the perentie lizard. The animals all have spiritual Tjukurpa legends attached to them, and each represents a different creation ancestor from the Dreamtime.

Taylor's work has been exhibited in many places around Australia. It has also been shown overseas, including at the Commonwealth Institute in London, in 2000. Examples of her work are held in the Powerhouse Museum in Sydney, the National Gallery of Australia, and the National Museum of Australia.
