= Topsy Tjulyata =

Aboriginal Australian woodcarver (1931–2010s)

- Born: 1931
- Died: 2010s
- Occupations: Sculptor, craftswoman, painter
- Years active: 1980–2010s
- Organization: Maṟuku Arts
- Style: Pokerwork, Western Desert art
- Spouse: Walter Pukutiwara
- Children: Rene Kulitja

Topsy Tjulyata (1931–2010s) was an Aboriginal artist from central Australia. She made wooden objects, known in Western Desert languages as puṉu. Tjulyata made these by carving the wood and then engraving patterns (walka) into its surface with a burning wire. This technique is called pokerwork. The wood she used was sourced locally from the area around Uluṟu, where she lived. She made both decorative sculptures and traditional tools. The patterns engraved into the objects depict Tjukurpa, spiritual stories about creation ancestors from the Dreamtime.

== Early life and education ==
Topsy began working in arts and crafts at Ernabella in the late 1940s. She specialised in wood carving. While she was living there, she married Walter Pukutiwara, a shepherd who also crafted tools. They later moved to Amaṯa.

== Career, later life and death ==
In 1981, Topsy and Walter went to Uluṟu and set up a tent at the base of Uluṟu. From there they sold their puṉu works to tourists for over two weeks. They did this trip with other artists from Amaṯa, including Pulya Taylor and Tony Tjamiwa, and their friends Peter Yates and Pat D'Arango. In 1983, this group travelled around to artist communities in the Aṉangu Pitjantjatjara Yankunytjatjara Lands. This was to discuss the idea of setting up a new craft centre at Uluṟu that would sell artworks from around the region to tourists. The couple moved to Muṯitjulu so that they could help set up Maṟuku Arts. Topsy and Water were some of the first artists for the centre, and worked together closely until Walter's death in 2004. Topsy remained a member of the organisation's Governing Committee. She died in the 2010s.

== Notable collections ==
A collection of wooden bowls made by Topsy are held in the National Gallery of Australia. The patterns engraved on the surfaces depict stories about the Seven Sisters. Both the Powerhouse Museum and the National Museum of Australia contain examples of Topsy's sculptures. The sculptures are of Wati Ngiṉṯaka, the perentie man.
