= Tjungkara Ken =

Australian artist (born 1969)

- Born: 1 October 1969 (age 57) near Amata, South Australia
- Occupation: Painter
- Years active: 2008 – present
- Organization: Tjala Arts
- Style: Western Desert art
- Parent(s): Mick Wikilyiri (father); Paniny Mick (mother)

Tjungkara Ken (born 1 October 1969) is a Pitjantjatjara artist from Amata, South Australia, in the APY lands. She began painting in 1997, when Minymaku Arts was opened by the women of Amaṯa. She started painting professionally in 2008. By that time, the artists' co-operative had been renamed Tjala Arts.

== Themes ==
Ken's paintings depict stories and figures from her personal Tjukurpa (Dreaming), the spirituality that is associated with her ancestor's homeland. Her father is from the country around Amaṯa and Walitjara, and Ken most often depicts this country and its Tjukurpa in her paintings. She also illustrates her mother's country, which is further west, near Irrunytju in Western Australia.

== Exhibitions and awards ==
Ken's paintings have been featured in group exhibitions in many of Australia's major cities. Some of her work was also part of an exhibition in Graz, Austria in 2002. One of her paintings, titled Ngayuku ngura – My Country, was chosen as a finalist for the National Aboriginal & Torres Strait Islander Art Award in 2010. It was bought by a private collector.

A painting depicting the Kungkarungkara (Seven Sisters Dreaming), was chosen by the Art Gallery of South Australia as the prize for a competition run during the Gallery's Desert Country exhibition in 2011. Ken's painting from the Art Gallery of South Australia's permanent collection was also included in the exhibition and featured on the cover of the Desert Country catalogue. The exhibition featured works by several artists from across the Aṉangu Pitjantjatjara Yankunytjatjara lands, including Maringka Baker, Nura Rupert and Jimmy Baker.

Examples of Ken's work are shown in the National Gallery of Victoria, the Art Gallery of South Australia, the Queensland Gallery of Modern Art, and the National Gallery of Australia. It is also held in several major private galleries in Australia.

She was an Archibald Prize finalist in 2017, with her Kungkarangkalpa tjukurpa (Seven Sisters dreaming), a self-portrait. She was awarded the Roberts Family Aboriginal and Torres Strait Islander Prize for Seven Sisters, her entry in the 2021 Wynne Prize.

== Family links ==
There are many other artists in Ken's extended family, working out of Tjala Arts. When working with her four sisters—Yaritji Young, Freda Brady, Sandra Ken and Maringka Tunkin—the group is known as the Ken Sisters.
