= Yilpi Adamson =

Australian artist (born 1954)

- Born: Imiyari; 1954 (age 71–72); Northern Territory
- Occupation: Artist
- Years active: 2005 – present
- Organization: Ernabella Arts
- Style: Western Desert painting, weaving, batik, sculpture
- Spouse: Trevor Adamson

Imiyari "Yilpi" Adamson (born 1954) is an Aboriginal artist from central Australia. She is known for her work in a range of art forms, including painting, sculpture, weaving, knitting and batik.

Yilpi was born at a place near Uluru, in the Northern Territory. Her mother was a member of the Pitjantjatjara people and her father was Yankunytjatjara. When Yilpi was still very young, her parents came to live at Ernabella, a Presbyterian mission in northwest South Australia. She grew up there, and later began working at Ernabella Arts.

Batik was one of the first forms of art Yilpi learned to make at Ernabella. Several of her works were shown at an exhibition in Adelaide in 2006, and one of these was bought for the Powerhouse Museum in Sydney. Later examples of her batik works were bought by the National Museum of Scotland in Edinburgh. Yilpi is also known for making woven items, such as baskets, out of tjanpi (desert grass). She made several objects with a women's project called the Tjanpi Desert Weavers.

Yilpi began painting much more recently. She has painted both abstract and figurative works. The abstract works are expressions of her Dreamtime legends, passed down to her from her mother. Her most successful works, however, are the figurative paintings of her life as a child at Ernabella in the 1950s.

Examples of Yilpi's paintings are held in the Art Gallery of South Australia and the National Museum of Australia. The National Gallery of Australia also has a series of ceramic pots that Yilpi painted with Malpiya Davey, Alison Carroll, and other Ernabella women. The National Gallery of Victoria also owns several of her works.
