= Ken Sisters =

Indigenous Australian art collective

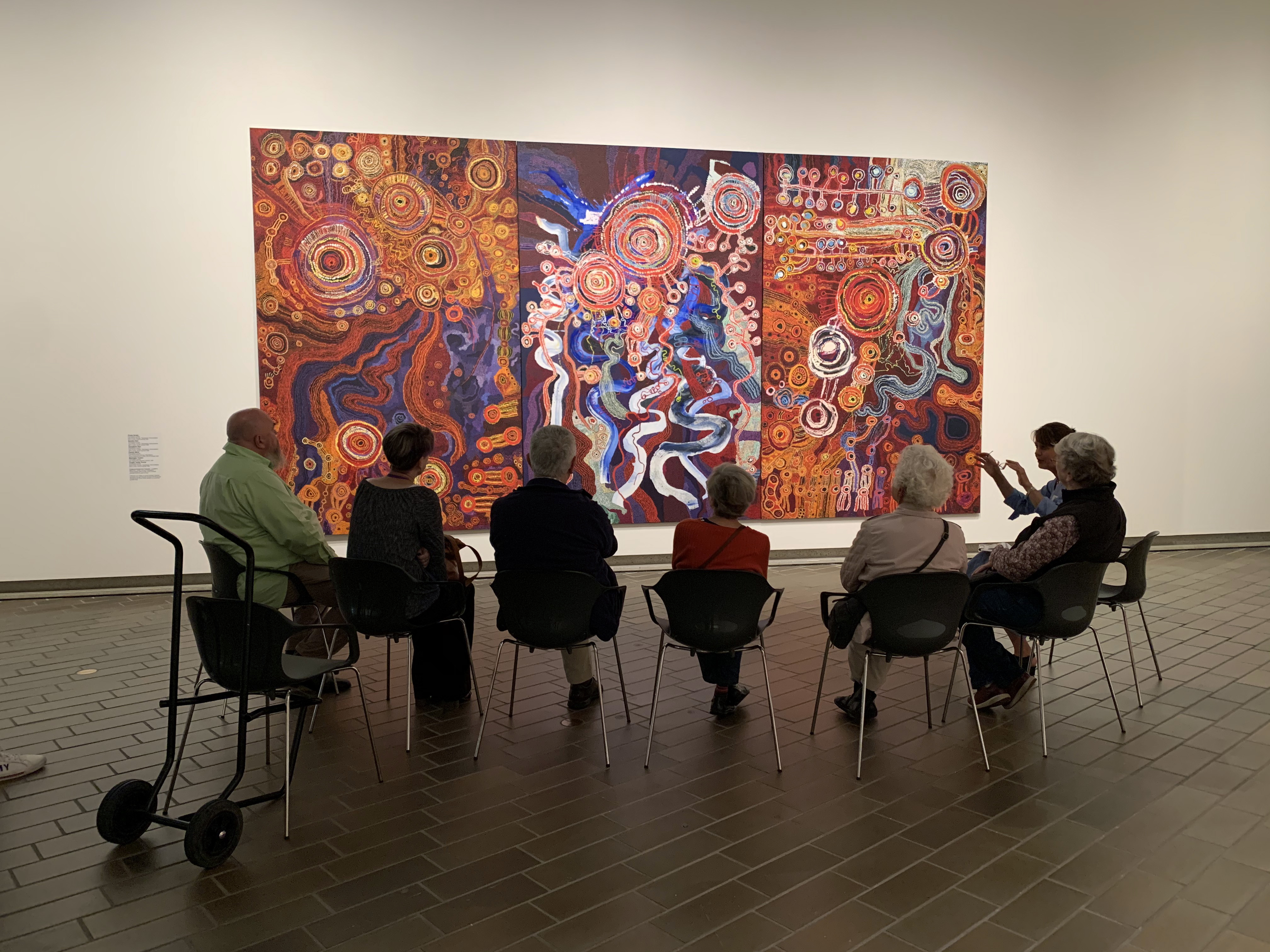
The Ken Sisters Kangkura-Kangkura Tjukurpa - A sister's story the Know My Name exhibition at the National Gallery of Australia

The Ken Sisters also known as the Ken Family Collaborative or Ken Sisters Collaborative are a collective of award-winning Pitjantjatjara artists from the Aṉangu Pitjantjatjara Yankunytjatjara Lands of northern South Australia.

== Artists ==
- Tjungkara Ken
- Tingila Yaritji Young
- Maringka Tunkin
- Paniny Mick
- Sandra Ken
- Freda Brady
- Sylvia Ken
- Nyanu Ken

== History ==
The Ken Sisters are the daughters of artist Mick Wikilyiri, a traditional owner of Tjala (Honey Ant) Country. They live and work in Amata community and are represented by Tjala Arts and APY Art Centre Collective.

As part of the Western Desert art movement, they work collaboratively, at times painting the one canvas simultaneously on the studio floor. As Tjunkara Ken describes "that's the way I came up painting, kids sitting down with grandmas, and grandma telling the story and putting dots down". They regularly paint Tjala tjukurpa (Honey Ant dreaming) and to Kungkarangkalpa tjukurpa (Seven Sisters dreaming), "two stories that are their birthright and their bond".

Seven Sisters by Tjungkara Ken, Yaritji Young, Freda Brady, Maringka Tunkin and Sandra Ken was the winner of the Art Gallery of New South Wales's Wynne Prize in 2016. They also won the People's Choice Award at the National Aboriginal and Torres Strait Islander Art Award in 2018.

Their work has been exhibited in the Adelaide Biennial of Australian Art at the Art Gallery of South Australia, The Art Gallery of New South Wales, the Know My Name exhibition at the National Gallery of Australia and a range of commercial galleries. It is included in the collections of the National Gallery of Australia, Artbank, National Museum of Australia and The Deakin University Art Collection.
