= Margaret Eaton =

Margaret Eaton may refer to:

- Margaret Eaton, Baroness Eaton (born 1942), British politician
- Margaret O'Neill Eaton (1799–1879), American woman (wife of a United States Senator) involved in the "Petticoat affair"
- Margaret Fernie Eaton (1871–1953), English artist
