= Rene Kulitja =

Aboriginal Australian artist

- Wanuny Kulitja
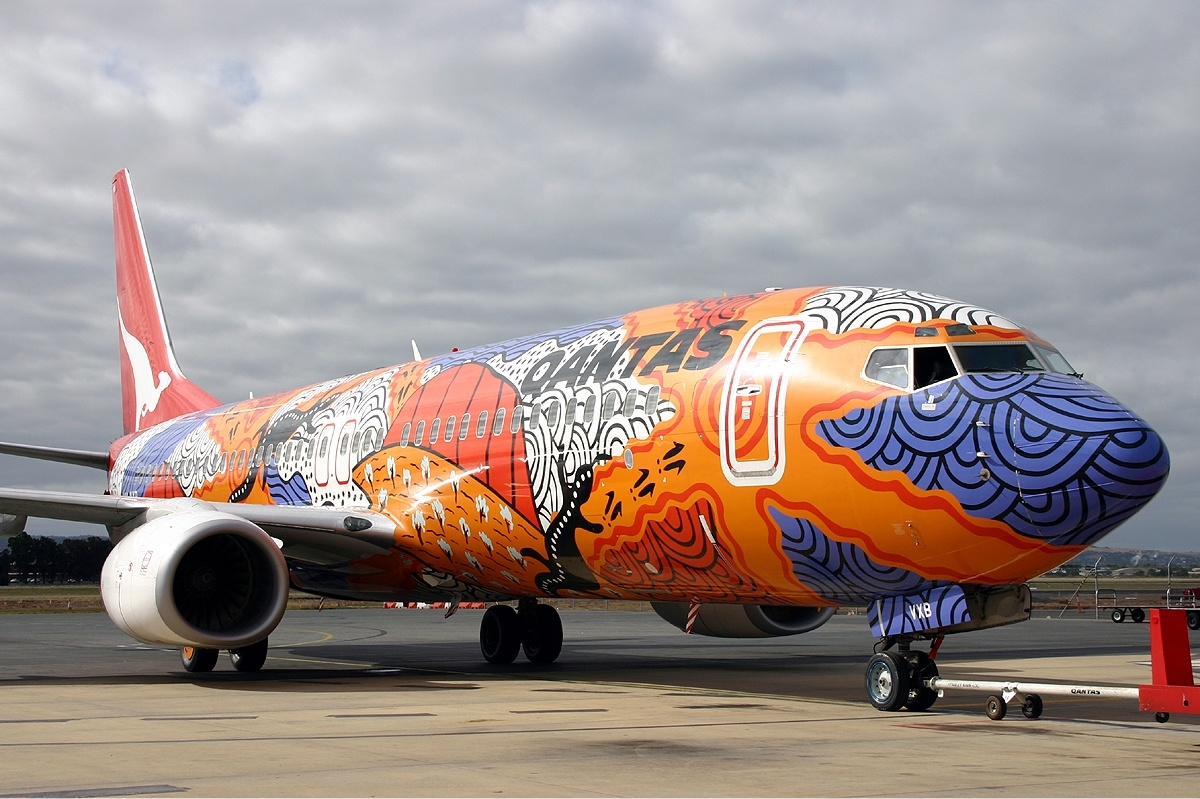
- Yananyi Dreaming at Adelaide Airport, 2005
- Born: 1958 (age 67–68); Ernabella, South Australia
- Occupation: Artist
- Years active: 1990s – present
- Organization(s): Walkatjara Art Uluṟu; Maṟuku Arts Board
- Notable work: Yananyi Dreaming
- Style: Western Desert painting, sculpture
- Spouse: Richard Kulitja
- Parent(s): Walter Pukutiwara, Topsy Tjulyata

Rene Kulitja (born 1958), also known as Wanuny Kulitja, is an Aboriginal Australian artist. She works with a range of media, including paint, glass and ceramics. Her most famous design is probably Yananyi Dreaming, which covers a Qantas Boeing 737.

== Life ==
=== Early life ===
Rene was born in 1958, in Ernabella (Pukatja), in the APY lands, of South Australia. Her family are Pitjantjatjara people, and her Pitjantjatjara name is Wanuny. She grew up in northern South Australia, and then moved to Kaltukatjara following her marriage to Richard Kulitja. When Uluṟu-Kata Tjuṯa National Park was handed back to traditional owners in 1985, the couple moved to Muṯitjulu to work in tourism. Shortly after moving there Kulitja became involved in arts and crafts at the women's centre, and was a founding director of Walkatjara Art. Richard became the manager of Aṉangu Tours.

=== As an artist ===
During the mid-1990s, Kulitja worked with other women artists on the interior design of the park's cultural centre. She also took a course on glasswork techniques at the University of South Australia, along with three other women from the region. After a successful exhibition of work made using these new skills, Kulitja and the other women received a commission from the Ayers Rock Resort at Yulara for a panel of glass decorated with traditional designs.

In 2000, Kulitja was one of over 300 Aboriginal women from Central Australia to perform at the Opening Ceremony of the Summer Olympic Games in Sydney as a part of the 'Awakening' sequence which showed the diversity of Aboriginal and Torres Strait Islander people across Australia.

In 2002, Kulitja worked with Balarinji Studio in Sydney to design the exterior of a Qantas Boeing 737-800 fuselage. The design she painted was of Uluṟu. It was based on traditional designs and sacred Dreaming legends. The fleet was launched on 14 February 2002, with a special ceremony performed by singers and dancers from Muṯitjulu. The word (y)ananyi means "to go" or "to travel" in Pitjantjatjara and Yankunytjatjara. It was the third Qantas aircraft to be painted in an Aboriginal design. Kulitja did something similar again in 2010, when a semi-trailer was decorated with another of her designs as part of a national roadshow by Maṟuku Arts.

=== Community work ===
Kulitja has held an important position within the Pitjantjatjara–Yankunytjatjara community for several years. She has been a member of both the Muṯitjulu Community Council and the Board of Management of Uluṟu-Kata Tjuṯa National Park. In 2006, she became the chairperson of Maṟuku Arts. In October 2007, she was elected for a two-year term as a director on the Ngaanyatjarra, Pitjantjatjara and Yankunytjatjara Women's Council.

As a community advocate, Kulitja has campaigned to address the issues of petrol sniffing in Aboriginal communities in central Australia. Her own family has been deeply affected by the problem.

== Art ==
Kulitja works with a range of media, including paint, glass, ceramics and tjanpi (desert grass) through the Tjanpi Desert Weavers social enterprise at NPY Women's Council. She makes paintings, woven baskets, and glass and ceramic sculptures. Her work has been shown in many exhibitions across Australia. It has also been exhibited in Belgium and Japan.

An example of her glass work is shown in the National Gallery of Australia. It is a coolamon made of glass (rather than the traditional wood), and has been exhibited in several Australian galleries. Examples of her paintings are held in the National Museum of Ethnology in Osaka. Kulitja is also known for making traditional-style jewellery using modern techniques and media. Some of her jewellery work was featured on The Oprah Winfrey Show when Winfrey visited Uluṟu in December 2010.

Her works are in the collections of:

- Walkatjara Art Archive
- Araluen Arts Centre Collection
- National Gallery of Australia
- UNESCO, Brussels
- Environment Australia Collection
- National Museum of Australia
- Maruku Arts Collection

== Exhibitions ==
- TarraWarra Biennale (with the Tjanpi Desert Weavers/Fiona Hall), 2014
- 56th Venice Biennale (with the Tjanpi Desert Weavers/Fiona Hall), 2015
- Songlines: Tracking the Seven Sisters (National Museum of Australia & international tour), 2017
- Kunturu Kulini (Artsite Galleries, Sydney), 2018
- 48th Canterbury Art Exhibition (Melbourne), 2020
- Rising: Shadow Spirit (Flinders Street Station, Melbourne), 2023
