= Black and White Club =

Black and White Club may refer to

- Black and White Club, a driving club
- Black and White Club of the Australian Cartoonists' Association
- Black and White Club (art association) founded in the 19th century in New York
