= Paniny Mick =

Aboriginal Australian artist

- Born: 1 January 1939; Rocket Bore, Aṉangu Pitjantjatjara Yankunytjatjara Lands, South Australia
- Died: 24 February 2022 (aged 83); Mparntwe (Alice Springs), Northern Territory
- Resting place: Mparntwe (Alice Springs), Northern Territory, Australia

Paniny Mick (c. 1 January 1939 – 24 February 2022) was an Aboriginal Australian artist from Aṉangu Pitjantjatjara Yankunytjatjara Lands. She was born in the Rocket Bore, Aṉangu Pitjantjatjara Yankunytjatjara Lands, South Australia which, and died in Mparntwe (Alice Springs), Northern Territory.

== Early life ==
Paniny Mick, from the Pitjantjatjara language group, was born at Aran'nga, near Walytjitjata, where she grew up hearing and experiencing the ngimaka Tjukurpa, a Dreaming story. She lived a traditional Indigenous lifestyle with her family, consuming bush foods and gathering seeds for flour. Her family travelled together, living in the bush before encountering white settlers. They initially travelled with camels to Pukatja, where her family started working, and Paniny attended school, learning both Pitjantjatjara and English. Her early life was marked by a mix of traditional Indigenous practices and adaptation to the changing influences of white settlers.

== Art career ==
Paniny Mick's art career flourished in Amata, where she initially focused on weaving and rug-making at a small house. With the arrival of Tracey-Lea, she transitioned into painting at the local art centre, where she developed her skills and became an integral part of the arts community. Her contributions to the arts in Amata helped shape a vibrant creative scene, and she embraced painting as a medium to express her culture and heritage. Paniny's dedication to her craft and community exemplifies her commitment to Indigenous art and culture.

Together with Freda Brady, Sandra Ken, Tjungkara Ken, Maringka Tunkin, and Yaritji Young from the Aṉangu Pitjantjatjara Yankunytjatjara lands, Paniny Mick created "Kangkura-KangkuraKu Tjukurpa: A Sister’s Story" in 2017. The piece, made with synthetic polymer paint on linen, comprises three panels, each measuring 300 x 200 cm. It vibrantly expresses the artists' individual styles while conveying their shared Dreaming stories. The work reflects the artists' unique approaches to painting and highlights their connection to their cultural heritage, emphasizing the strength of familial bonds and the importance of storytelling in their community. The artwork was exhibited in the 2018 Adelaide Biennial of Australian Art, where it underscored the power of collective artistic expression and the enduring vitality of Indigenous cultural narratives.

== "Contemporary Australia: Women", 2012 ==
The 2012 exhibition "Contemporary Australia: Women" held at the Gallery of Modern Art (GOMA) in Brisbane fits the category of a "feminist blockbuster," featuring over 70 works by 33 Australian women artists and aimed to celebrate contemporary women artists' achievements. Paniny Mick as part of a group of senior women artists from Amata who contributed to the exhibition, was featured in the exhibition. Their collective work is praised for its vibrancy and vitality, showcasing the unique intergenerational art production among Indigenous Australian women.

The exhibition underscored the importance of celebrating Indigenous artists' achievements and their role in shaping contemporary Australian art. Paniny Mick's work exemplifies how Indigenous art forms, particularly those created by women, offer distinctive and original contributions to the broader art world, thus reinforcing the vital presence of Indigenous voices in Australia's artistic environment。

== Significant Works ==
2017

- Kangkura-KangkuraKu Tjukurpa – A Sister's Story, by Paniny Mick, Freda Brady, Sandra Ken et al.

2016

- Mamu – the good spirits, by Paniny Mick

2013

- Tjanpi Tjina, by Paniny Mick, Freda Brady, Kunmanara (Wawiriya) Burton, Unrupa Rhonda Dick et al.

2012

- Tjanpi punu (trees), by Paniny Mick, Mary Katatjuku Pan, Iluwanti Ken, Naomi Kantjuriny et al.

2011

- Kuḻaṯa Urtjanpa (Spear bush), by Paniny Mick
- Paarpakani (Take flight), by Paniny Mick
- Paarpakani (Take flight), by Paniny Mick, Iluwanti Ken, Naomi Kantjuriny, Kunmanara (Niningka) Lewis et al.

2003

- Wananpi – watersnake, by Paniny Mick, Naomi Kantjuriny, Iluwanti Ken, Paniny Mick et al.
