= Tjunkaya Tapaya =

Aboriginal Australian artist

Tjunkaya Tapaya OAM
- Born: 1947 (age 78–79)
- Occupation: Artist
- Years active: 1971–present
- Organization: Ernabella Artists
- Style: Batik, ceramics

Tjunkaya Tapaya OAM (born 1947) is an Aboriginal Australian artist. She is most recognised for her batik work and is one of the best-known batik artists in Australia. Her works also include acrylic paintings, weaving, fibre sculpture, ceramics, wood carving and printmaking.

== Early life ==
Tapaya is a member of the Pitjantjatjara people. She was born in 1947 in the desert in the far northwest of South Australia. Her mother had walked from Walytjitjata, in the Northern Territory, and arrived at Ernabella Mission shortly after Tapaya's birth. Ernabella was run by missionaries at the time, and Tjunkaya grew up there.

== Career ==
The craft room at Ernabella Mission was established in 1948 and nurtured the artistic talents of Tapaya and other children and adults living on the mission. The craft room taught spinning and weaving originally but later added batik and painting to its activities, and later still became a professionally run Aboriginal-owned incorporated arts enterprise known as Ernabella Arts, after the mission was closed and the land returned to its traditional Pitjantjatjara owners.

Like most early artists in her community, Tjunkaya's original style came from milpatjunanyi – an ancient Western Desert practice of drawing in the sand to tell stories to children. This is the basis of the classic Ernabella "walka".

Ernabella women began to be taught batik making in 1971. In 1974, Ernabella Arts sent Tapaya to Yogyakarta with several other Pitjantjatjara women to learn more about making batik from Indonesian artists. Tapaya became one of the best-known batik artists in Australia.

== Style and themes ==
Apart from batik, Tapaya's work also include acrylic paintings, weaving, fibre sculpture, ceramics, wood carving, and printmaking. Since 2015 she has concentrated on painting and tjanpi sculpture, but more recently recommenced ceramics.

Most of Tapaya's paintings depict places and events from her family's dreaming stories. Her batik work is of the classic Ernabella style, which eschews the Indonesian use of repeated block printed designs in favour of hand-drawn freehand designs or "walka". These "walka" are pure design and do not refer to, or contain reference to, dreamings or "tjukurpa".

== Other activities ==
Tapaya was deputy chair of the Ernabella art centre, and leader of the Nintintjaku Project, a teaching project working with Ernabella Anangu School and the Ernabella NPY youth team.

She has written extensively in Pitjantjatjara, and has developed a bilingual children's book. Her essays have been published in several exhibition catalogues, including the 2017 Desert Mob and Tarnanthi catalogues.

== Recognition and awards ==
In 2009 Tapaya won the "Me and My Toyota Art Prize".

In 2011 and 2012 Tapaya's work was selected as a finalist in the Togart Contemporary Art Award, and in 2012 her tjulpu (bird) tjanpi sculptures were selected for exhibition in the National Aboriginal and Torres Strait Islander Art Awards (NATSIAA).

In 2016, a collaborative work to which she contributed was selected as a NATSIAA finalist.

In 2018, Tapaya was the recipient of the Gladys Elphick Award for Lifetime Achievement.

On 8 June 2020, in the 2020 Queen's Birthday Honours, Tapaya was awarded a Medal of the Order of Australia (OAM) in recognition of her service to Indigenous visual arts and the community.

In 2021 she was a NATSIAA finalist.

In 2022, she was nominated as OCPSE Leader of the Year in the Woman of the Year Awards (SkyCity Adelaide, The Advertiser, and Sunday Mail)

== Exhibitions and galleries ==
Tapaya's work has been shown in several exhibitions in Australia and internationally.

Tapaya has work in the National Gallery of Victoria, the State Library of South Australia, the Queensland Gallery of Modern Art, the National Gallery of Australia, the National Museum of Australia, the British Museum, the Scottish National Gallery, Artbank, and the Museum of Ethnology in Osaka, Japan.
