= Maringka Tunkin =

Australian Aboriginal artist

Maringka Tunkin (born 1959) is a Pitjantjatjara artist from Central Australia.

== Life ==
Tunkin was born at Mulga Park in the south-west of the Northern Territory, near the South Australian border in 1959. She is the daughter of Mick Wikilyiri, who is the custodian and traditional owner of Tjala (Honey Ant) Country. Her mother Paniny Mick, is also an artist, whose work is in punu (wood carving), batik, and weaving.

== Career ==
Tunkin is part of a contemporary Western Desert art tradition which involves working collaboratively in the creation of art, predominately painting. She is part of a family collaborative called the Ken Sisters, along with Tingila Yaritji Young, Freda Brady, Sandra Ken, and Tjungkara Ken. They initially came together 20 years ago under the name Minymaku Arts (meaning "belonging to women"), a collective of artists formed in Amata in the Anangu Pitjantjatjara Yankunytjatjara (APY) Lands. She is now represented by the APY Art Centre Collective. She is also an advocate against the exploitation of artists by unscrupulous art dealers.

Tunkin, as part of the Ken Sisters, won the Wynne Prize 2016 for their work Seven Sisters, . The work also won the People's Choice award in the 35th National Aboriginal & Torres Strait Islander Art Awards (NATSIAA).

Her work has been exhibited at the Art Gallery of New South Wales, the National Gallery of Australia in its Know My Name exhibition and internationally. She is also represented in the collections of the Art Gallery of New South Wales and Art Gallery of South Australia.
