= Angkuna Kulyuru =

Aboriginal Australian artist

- Born: 1943 (age 82–83); Wamitjara, near Yunyarinyi, South Australia
- Occupations: Artist: textile arts; printmaking; Wood carving; weaving
- Years active: 1980s–present
- Organization: Ernabella Arts
- Style: Batik, lithographs
- Spouse: Graham Kulyuru

Angkuna Kulyuru (born 1943) is an Aboriginal Australian artist. She is perhaps best known for her batik and printing works. She also does weaving, basketry, and carved wooden sculptures (puṉu). Her batik designs display the fluid, abstract style that is distinctive in Ernabella Arts. There are no specific meanings to her designs, but they are inspired by the natural environment.

Kulyuru was born in 1943, at Wamitjara, near Kenmore Park (now Yunyarinyi). This is in the far north of South Australia, near the border with the Northern Territory. Her family are Pitjantjatjara. They lived a traditional life in the bush, but settled at Ernabella soon after Kulyuru was born. When she grew up, Kulyuru started work in the community's craft centre after originally working at the school. She began learning batik methods in the 1970s, and became one of Ernabella Arts' most prolific and well-known batik artists. Kulyuru has nine children. Five of Kulyuru's daughters have also become artists: Unurupa (born 1962), Amanda (1964), Karen (1969), Daisybell (1972) and Tjulyata (1978).

Kulyuru's works have been shown in many exhibitions since the 1980s. One of her early batik works was chosen as a finalist for the National Aboriginal and Torres Strait Islander Art Award in 1987. It was bought by the Museum and Art Gallery of the Northern Territory. Other examples of her work are held in the National Gallery of Victoria, the National Gallery of Australia, and the National Museum of Australia. An example of one of her weaving work, a jug made out of palm leaves, is in the British Museum.
