= Fractal burning =

Wood burning technique

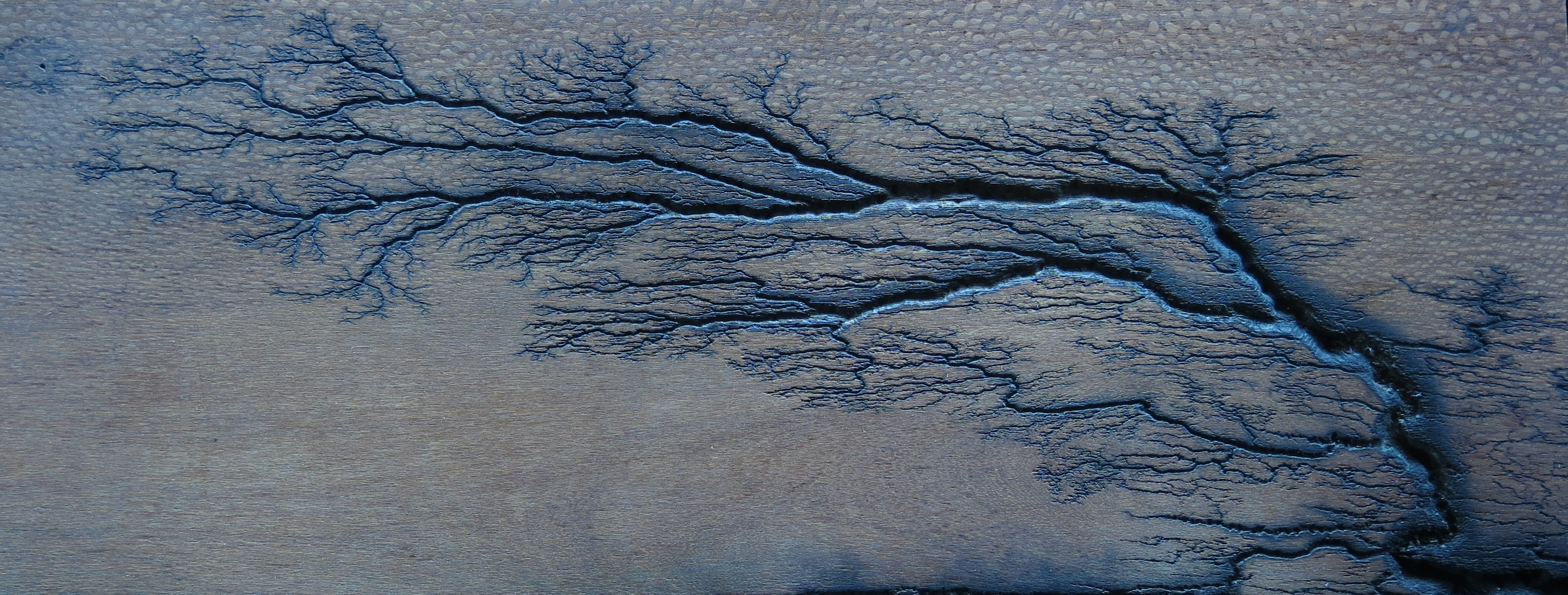
Lichtenberg branching figure in leopardwood

Fractal burning, Lichtenberg burning or wood fracking refers to a technique where a branching pattern known as a Lichtenberg figure is burnt into wood using high voltage electricity. It has gained notoriety due to numerous incidents when people have attempted it at home; between 2017 and 2022, fractal wood burning was documented to have caused the deaths of at least 35 people, in addition to several near-death cases resulting in severe, often disfiguring injuries.

== Process ==
By applying a coat of electrolytic solution to the surface of the wood, the resistance of the surface drops considerably. Two electrodes are then placed on the wood and a high voltage is passed across them. Current from the electrodes will cause the surface of the wood to heat up until the electrolyte boils and the wooden surface burns. Because the charred surface of the wood is mildly conductive, the surface of the wood will burn in a pattern outwards from the electrodes.

== Danger ==
The danger lies in the process relying on high voltages, much higher than normal mains electricity. High voltages enable a potentially fatal current to pass through the body. The slightest contact with the equipment involved may result in death. At such high voltages, arc flashes are also a risk.

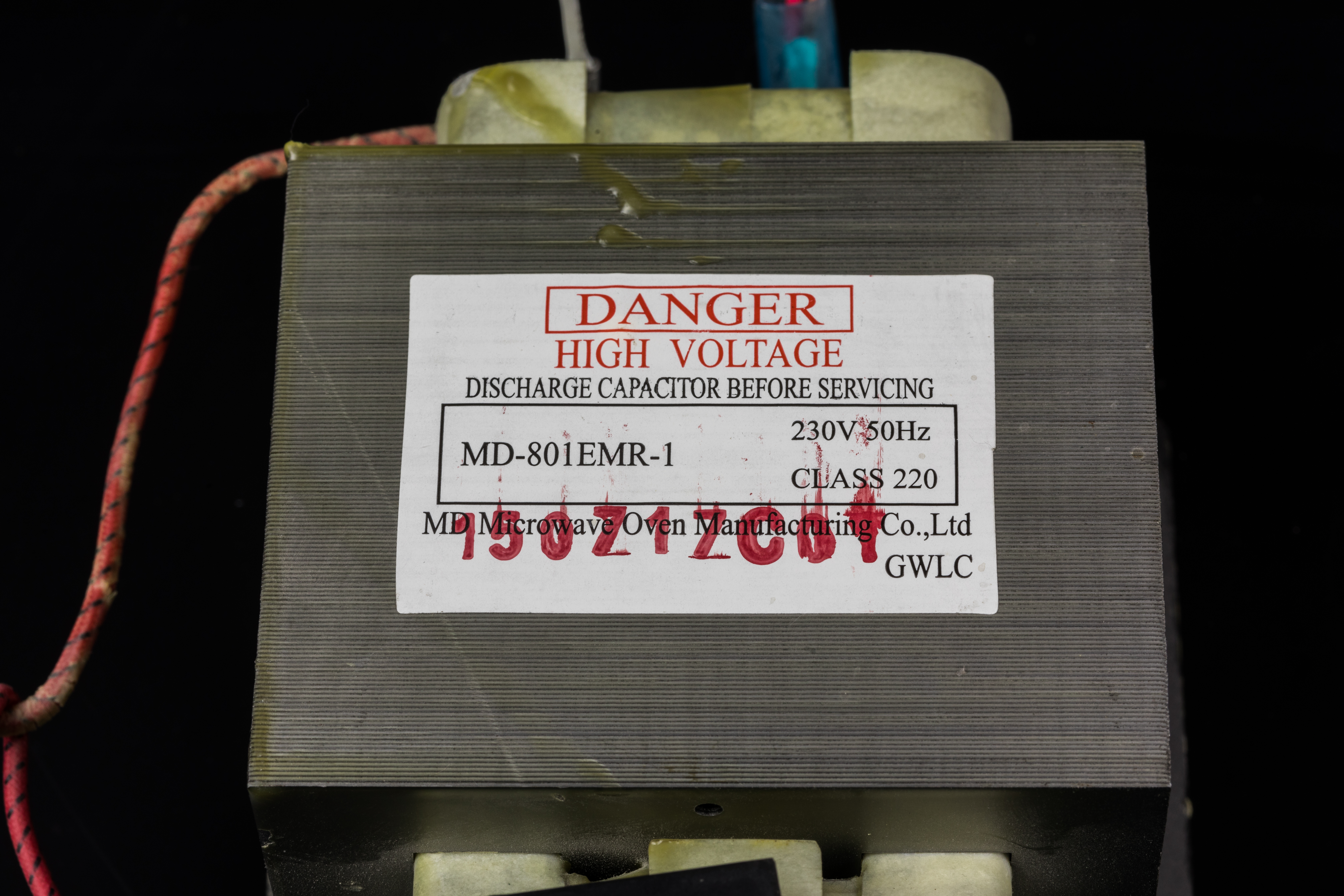
A transformer from a microwave oven, featuring a prominent warning of the danger of high voltage.

Transformers from microwave ovens are frequently used for the technique because they are easily obtainable. They can produce voltages of around 2,100 volts (the modern electric chair administers a shock of 2,000 volts during an execution), and a current of between 500 and 2,000 milliamps. Even a tenth or a hundredth of that current could be fatal, with 20 to 50 mA resulting in paralysis of respiratory muscles and respiratory arrest.

Death can occur from the victim's accidental contact with electrodes, the electrolyte solution, a loose wire, a conductive floor, or from contact between the wood and a non-insulated surface. The risk is generally increased due to the DIY nature of the activity, but as Rick Baker of the American Association of Woodturners (AAW) has noted, the "reported cases of fractal burning deaths range from hobbyist woodworkers through experienced woodworkers to an electrician with many years experience working with electricity." Because of the galvanic isolation in the transformer, a ground fault circuit interrupter (GFCI) will not be able to break the circuit in the event of an electric shock.

Reviews published in 2020 and 2025 noted that the mortality rate in incidents associated with fractal burning was "exceedingly high" at around 71%, by far exceeded "the risk of death from being struck by lightning, which carries the highest risk of mortality of all electrical sources", ranging between 10% to 30%.

Those who do survive usually require CPR or defibrillation and generally suffer severe high voltage electrical burns. There have been multiple instances of fourth-degree burn injuries resulting in "charred" fingers or hands, requiring amputation.

The AAW has, on safety grounds, banned any demonstrations or sales related to fractal burning at its events, strongly discourages any of its chapters from promoting the practice, and refuses to publish information about the practice other than safety warnings. The Association of Woodturners of Great Britain has instituted the same policy.

Other organisations which have warned against the practice include:

- Burn and Reconstructive Centers of America
- The Electrical Safety Authority of Ontario
- Electrical Safety Foundation International
- WorkSafe New Zealand
- The South Australia electrical safety regulator
- The Western Australia electrical safety regulator
