= Yaritji Young =

Australian Aboriginal artist and senior law woman

Yaritji Young (born c. 1956) is a Pitjantjatjara woman artist from Pukatja, a community within the Anangu Pitjantjatjara Yankunytjatjara Lands and she now lives at Rocket Bore; a homeland north of Amata. Young is a significant Australian Aboriginal artist and senior law women who is to committed to fostering law and culture and this forms a core part of her artistic practice. Most of Young's paintings are drawn from the Tjala (Honey Ant) Dreaming.

Young often works with her sisters and their collaborative artworks, in which they are known as 'The Ken Sisters Collaborative', receiving international attention and winning major awards.

== Life and painting ==
Young's parents are Mick Wikilyire and Paniny Mick and she was born in the bush, near a creek, at Pukatja. Little is known of her early life but she attended school in Amata and, it was here, that she first learnt to make baskets, her earliest form of textile work.

In late 2000 Young began painting at Tjala Arts (then known as Minymaku Arts) and her work in this medium is primarily drawn from the Tjala (Honey Ant) Dreaming but also incorporates Inma and Tjukurpa Dreaming. Of her paintings young says:

"My paintings are of my country; my father's country, my grandmother's country, the tjala country. Everything that my grandmother taught me, I'm teaching to my children now. They dance because I have shared what I got from my grandmother with my granddaughters, so they can know their culture."

— Yaritji Young, Short Street Gallery

Young has also worked with Tjanpi Desert Weavers as a textile artist. Her style of textile work is intricate and often contains humorous subjects; her most well-known and sought-after textile pieces are large, low-rimmed baskets decorated with emu feathers.

As an individual Young is a successful artist and, after many group exhibitions, had her first solo exhibition 'Yaritji Young: Walytjapitiku Laina - Family Lines', at the Alcaston Gallery in Melbourne, in 2017; this was followed by two more in 2018 and 2019 respectively at the same gallery. Her individual work is also held in many significant collections including the Art Gallery of New South Wales, Art Gallery of South Australia and the Queensland Art Gallery.

Young also works with her sisters; Freda Brady, Maringka Tunkin, Sandra Ken and Tjungkara Ken and, together, they form the Ken Sisters also known as the Ken Family Collaborative. In this collaborative the sisters paint together, sometimes simultaneously and sometimes consecutively, on a grounded canvas and, together, they focus on familiar and familial subjects that they share as their birthright.

In 2018 the sisters won the People's Choice category at the National Aboriginal & Torres Strait Islander Art Award with their six square metre painting 'Seven Sisters' which tells the Tjukarpa story about the constellations of the Pleiades (the sisters) and Orion (a lusty or bad man) and the sisters attempts to run away/protect each other.

'Seven Sisters' went on to win the 2019 Wynne Prize.

== See also ==
- Art of Australia
