= Nura Rupert =

Australian artist (born c. 1933)

- Born: c. 1933; Tjitapiti, South Australia, Australia
- Died: 2016 (aged 82–83)
- Occupation: Artist
- Years active: 2000 – 2016
- Organization: Ernabella Arts
- Style: Western Desert art
- Relatives: Mulayingu Ruperthas (Son)

Nura Rupert was an Australian Aboriginal artist from north-west South Australia. She was also a ngangkari (a traditional healer among Anangu people) until her death in 2016. She produced two primary kinds of art works. She produced her print works using intaglio methods of printmaking. The designs are drawn by etching and linocutting, and the prints are done on paper. Her second medium of choice is making punu, wood carvings often decorated with a hot poker.

Nura was born in about 1933, in north-western South Australia. The place of her birth was Tjitapiti, which is northeast of Nyapaṟi, and close to what is now the outstation of Angatja. Nura was a "bush baby" (she was born in the bush), and her family lived a traditional, nomadic way of life in the desert around Angatja. Nura was a baby when her parents and elder brother settled at Ernabella, which was a Presbyterian mission at the time.

Nura worked in crafts from a young age. Growing up at the mission, she learned weaving and knitting to make rugs and clothes. She also learned to make artistic objects from wood carving and poker work. It was not until 2000, when she was in her late sixites, that she began painting, producing acrylic paintings on canvases. She started using printmaking techniques a few years later.

Most of Nura's designs depict stories from her childhood. They are usually images of children or animals, such as dingos and goats. But her favorite subjects include animals, birds and flowers, which she paints with a great sense of joy. These are from traditional Pitjantjatjara stories told to children to make sure they stay away from trouble. Her style is often described as "child-like", because the shapes are very simple and look like a child's drawings. Nura's depictions of the spirits are not malevolent, but are cheeky in her dynamic treatment of them. For example, her work Papa tjuta tjukurpa (Camp dogs story) (2009) depicts a group of animals, painted red and orange on a natural and dynamic blue background. Her son, Mulayingu Ruperthas, described her mum to myTjamuandKamias joyful, alwayshappy, and full of laughter.

Works by Nura have been featured in exhibitions since 2000, in many of Australia's major cities and also in cities in the United Kingdom. Her work is held in several major collections, including Flinders University, the Art Gallery of South Australia, the National Gallery of Australia, the National Museum of Australia, and Parliament House in Canberra. Prints by Nura were chosen as finalists for the National Aboriginal & Torres Strait Islander Art Awards in 2006 and 2007, and the Western Australian Indigenous Art Awards in 2010. Nura's work has been offered at auction multiple times, with realized prices ranging from 227 USD to 3,320 USD, depending on the size and medium of the artwork. Since 2010 the record price for this artist at auction is 3,320 USD for MAMU TJUTA / LOTS OF SPOOKY SPIRITS!, sold at Deutscher & Hackett, Melbourne in 2014.
