= Maringka Baker =

Australian artist (born c. 1952)

- Born: c. 1952 (age 73–74); Kaliumpil, Western Australia, Australia
- Occupation: Painter
- Years active: 2004 – present
- Organization: Tjungu Palya
- Style: Western Desert art
- Spouse: Douglas Baker
- Children: Elaine Woods (born 1969); Claire Baker (born 1980s) specific dates unknown
- Relatives: Anmanari Brown; Jimmy Baker

Maringka Baker is an Aboriginal artist from central Australia. She lives in the Pitjantjatjara community of Kaṉpi, South Australia, and paints for Tjungu Palya, based in nearby Nyapaṟi.Maringka is known for her paintings. Maringka paints sacred stories from her family's Dreaming (spirituality). As well as the important cultural meanings they carry, her paintings are known for being rich in colour and contrast. She often paints the desert landscape in bright green colours, and contrasts it against reds and ochres to depict landforms. She also uses layers of contrasting colours to show the detail of the desert in full bloom.

Maringka was born in outback Western Australia around 1952. She was born at Kaliumpil, an old ceremonial and camping site on the Ngaanyatjarra lands. Her mother and father died when she was a young girl, and Maringka was brought up by Anmanari Brown and her other relatives. She went to primary school on the mission at Warburton, but ran away to join relatives in Ernabella. She later moved to Kaltjiti, where she finished high school and got a job as a teacher.

In the late 1960s, Maringka married a man from Papulankutja. They had a daughter, Elaine, in 1969. Maringka's husband died while Elaine was still a baby. Maringka became a health worker and she moved with her daughter to Irrunytju to work in the local clinic. In the 1980s, Maringka married Douglas Baker (nephew of Jimmy Baker), and they moved back east to live at Kaṉpi.

Maringka began painting in 2004. She paints for Tjungu Palya, a community arts centre based in nearby Nyapaṟi. She has become one of the centre's most well-known painters. Since 2005, Maringka's work has been exhibited in many cities around Australia, including Adelaide, Alice Springs, Broome, Canberra, Melbourne, Perth and Sydney. Overseas, her work has been shown in exhibitions in Singapore, Seattle and London. Her work is held in the National Gallery of Australia, the Art Gallery of South Australia, the Australian National University, and the National Gallery of Victoria.

In 2007, Maringka was one of thirty artists featured in the first National Indigenous Art Triennial exhibition, Culture Warriors, at the National Gallery of Australia in Canberra. It showed four of her paintings: Anmangunga (2006), Kata Ala (2006), Ngura Mankurpa (2006), and Kuru Ala (2007). The last of these, Kuru Ala, is a depiction of a sacred women's site near Tjuntjuntjara that is associated with the creation story of the Seven Sisters (called Kungkarrakalpa in Pitjantjatjara). It was chosen as a finalist for the National Aboriginal and Torres Strait Islander Art Award in 2009, and is displayed in the National Gallery in Canberra.

== Collections ==
She has works in the collections of

- the National Gallery of Victoria (Pukara).
- the National Gallery of Australia (3 works including Kuru Ala, 2008, and Kuru Ala 2007)

== Other websites ==
- Maringka Baker at Short Street Gallery
