= Milyika Carroll =

Aboriginal Australian artist

Alison Milyika Carroll
- Born: 1958 (age 67–68); Ernabella, South Australia
- Other names: Windlass Carroll
- Occupations: Artist, designer, community leader
- Years active: 1980s – present
- Style: Western Desert painting, printmaking, batik, ceramics and textiles
- Spouse: Pepai Carroll
- Children: 5
- Relatives: Dickie Minyintiri (uncle)

Milyika Carroll (born 1958), also known as Alison Carroll, Alison Milyika Carroll, or "Windlass" Carroll, is an Aboriginal Australian artist. She is also a community leader on the Aṉangu Pitjantjatjara Yankunytjatjara Lands in South Australia.

== Life ==
Milyika was born in 1958, in Ernabella, northwest South Australia. At that time, it was a Presbyterian mission for Aboriginal people. After finishing primary school here, she went to high school in Alice Springs, at Saint Philips College and Yirara College. She moved back to Ernabella after finishing school. She briefly worked at the community's craft centre, making hand-painted bookmarks and gift cards. She also learned to use batik methods, which had been introduced to the community in 1971.

After about one or two years of working at the craft centre, Carroll decided to become a health worker. She did her training in Adelaide, and then went back to Ernabella to work in the clinic. She still worked at the craft centre sometimes, learning under her mother.

Carroll is married to Pepai Carroll, and they have five children.

=== Community work ===
Carroll has been involved in the administration of Ernabella Arts for several years. She served as its chairperson from 2001 to 2003, as its manager from 2004 to 2007, and then as chairperson again from 2007 to 2010. She was also the chairperson of Aṉanguku Arts and Culture Aboriginal Corporation from 2004 to 2006, and then became its director. Aṉanguku Arts is the organisation that coordinates and supports development of the art economy on the Aṉangu Pitjantjatjara Yankunytjatjara (APY) Lands. Her husband Pepai has also served as the organisation's chairman.

In April 2008, Carroll was chosen to attend the Australia 2020 Summit in Canberra, where she and Makinti Minutjukur represented the APY communities. She has since been involved in school administration in Ernabella, including serving as the chairwoman of the Governing Council of Ernabella Aṉangu School since 2011.

== Artwork ==
Carroll is known for painting, printmaking, batik, ceramic and textile works. She uses several printmaking methods, including lithographs, etchings and screen printing. Her painted designs are called walka, which are designs and symbols that mean something to her. They represent her identity and her own view of the world, and are associated with her family's Dreaming legends. The designs are abstract, and come from ancient ceremonial designs (historically painted on the body or rock).

Carroll has had her works held in many public and private galleries both in Australia and other countries. Example of her batik works are held in the Powerhouse Museum in Sydney, the State Library of South Australia in Adelaide, and the British Museum. The National Museum of Australia and the National Gallery of Australia both contain multiple examples of Carroll's printings, etchings, batik works, and textile paintings.

One of her earliest works, a painting done on paper, was chosen as one of the finalists for the first National Aboriginal and Torres Strait Islander Art Award in 1984. In 2011, Carroll's uncle, Dickie Minyintiri, became one of the oldest people to win the award.

A painting of a crucifix incorporating traditional designs, painted by Carroll for Deaconess Hilliard, who ran the craft room at Ernabella, was displayed in the "Talking Blak to History" exhibition at the National Museum of Australia from July 2020. The painting represented the relationship between the two women, and the deaconess had it hung over her bed until her death.

== Recognition and awards ==
Carroll won the Premier's Award for Lifetime Achievement at the South Australian Ruby Awards in 2018.

=== Australia Council for the Arts ===
The Australia Council for the Arts is the arts funding and advisory body for the Government of Australia. Since 1993, it has awarded a Red Ochre Award. It is presented to an outstanding Indigenous Australian (Aboriginal Australian or Torres Strait Islander) artist for lifetime achievement.

Year	Nominee / work	Award	Result
2020	herself	Red Ochre Award	Awarded
