= Jimmy Baker (Australian artist) =

Australian Aboriginal artist

- Born: Pintjutjara c. 1915 near Kaṉpi, South Australia, Australia
- Died: 20 April 2010 (aged about 95); Kaṉpi, South Australia
- Occupation: Painter
- Years active: 2004 – present
- Style: Western Desert art
- Spouse: Nyinmungka
- Children: Anton Baker; Kay Baker Tunkin; Marita Baker
- Relatives: Douglas Baker; Ivan Baker; Maringka Baker

Jimmy Baker (born as Pintjutjara; c. 1915 – 20 April 2010) was an Australian Aboriginal artist.

== Early life ==
Jimmy Baker was born some time around 1915. He was born at Malumpa, an old camping site near what is now Kaṉpi in north-western South Australia. His name at the time was Pintjutjara. He had a brother, Toby Ginger Baker, and a sister, Tjuwilya. He and his family lived a traditional, nomadic life in the desert, and had no contact with Euro-Australian society. Their first encounter with White people was in the early 1920s, with a group of Christian missionaries travelling from Ernabella to Warburton. On their way back, the missionaries tried to persuade the family to come with them to Ernabella, but Jimmy's father, Tjuwintjara, was not ready to give up life in the bush.

When Jimmy was a teenager, his father encountered an expedition led by anthropologist Ted Strehlow. Strehlow gave Tjuwintjara food in exchange for his help as a guide. Strehlow also gave the family a letter that entitled them to access the food stores at Ernabella. Because of this, the family decided to leave the desert behind, and they finally settled at Ernabella a short time after 1930.

Jimmy's father remained very traditional. He was well known for his survival skills and knowledge of the desert. In 1939, he acted as a guide for Strehlow and Charles Duguid on their expedition to the Petermann Ranges.

== After settlement ==
At Ernabella, Jimmy's first job was baking bread. Because of this, he was given the surname "Baker", and he chose the Christian name of "Jimmy" himself. Later, he got a job building fences on nearby stations, first at Kenmore Park and then Everard Park. In the late 1930s, Jimmy married a woman named Nyinmungka, whom he met while working at Everard Park. They moved back to Kenmore Park. They had one son and two daughters: Anton, Kay and Marita. All of Jimmy's children became artists and founding members of the Tjunga Palya centre.

In his later years, Jimmy became an important ngangkaṟi (traditional healer). He travelled far around central Australia, applying his traditional knowledge and skills. He and his wife lived in Kaltjiti, but Jimmy wanted to move closer to his family's homeland near Malumpa. In the early 1990s, he and two of his nephews, Ivan and Douglas Baker, established Kaṉpi as an outstation for their families.

== Artwork ==
Jimmy did not begin painting until 2004, six years before his death. Until about the 1980s, men's traditional art was widely considered sacred by Pitjantjatjara, and was not displayed in public like women's art was. Pintupi men in the north began painting in the 1970s, at Papunya Tula. This was considered sacrilege by other Western Desert groups, because knowledge of sacred law is considered dangerous. The sacred images in the paintings were obscured, though, and encrypted (hidden) by dots and lines. When the art style became popular, more and more Pitjantjatjara men began to paint.

Baker began painting as a way to preserve his stories and culture. Because he was a ngangkaṟi, he knew more about his country's sacred Dreaming stories than most. His paintings represent stories from the time of creation that dictate sacred law (Tjukurpa) for Pitjantjatjara people. Although he began very late in life, his paintings quickly became well known. The first major exhibition to show his work was an annual group exhibition called "Desert Mob", in Alice Springs. It first featured his work in 2005, and again every year after that until 2009. In 2007, Baker was one of thirty artists featured in the first National Indigenous Art Triennial exhibition, Culture Warrior. It showed three of his paintings: Katatjita (2006), Wanampi Kutjara (2006) and Piltati (2007). He was interviewed on South Australian television, speaking through a translator.

Having only painted for six years, Baker produced only a small number of works. His works are rare, and were considered valuable even when he was alive. Most of them are acrylic paintings done on canvas (cotton duck). He uses rich colours in the "dot" style that has become classical in Western Desert art.

Jimmy died in 2010, from a problem with his lungs. His work is major several major public and private collections in Australia, including the Art Gallery of South Australia, the National Gallery of Victoria, and the National Gallery of Australia. As well as his children, several of his grandchildren are also well-known artists painting for Tjungu Palya.
