= Black and White Club (art association) =

The Black and White Club was an art association in New York. It held monthly exhibits by 1895.

Members included E. Irving Couse, Margaret Fernie Eaton, Hugh M. Eaton, Robert Bruce Horsfall, Walter Russell.
