= Dickie Minyintiri =

- Born: c. 1915; Pilpirinyi, Western Australia
- Died: 23 September 2014 (aged 98–99)
- Occupation: Painter
- Years active: 2005 – 2014
- Organization: Ernabella Arts
- Notable work: Kanyalakutjina (2011)
- Style: Western Desert art
- Awards: National Aboriginal & Torres Strait Islander Art Award (2011)

Dickie Minyintiri (c. 1915 – 23 September 2014) was an Australian Aboriginal artist from Pukatja, South Australia. He began painting in 2005, when he was about 90 years old. He is now one of central Australia's most successful artists, after winning the National Aboriginal & Torres Strait Islander Art Award in 2011. He was said to be the oldest artist at Pukatja, and also the community's most senior lawman (a keeper of Tjukurpa or sacred knowledge).

== Life ==
Minyintiri was born into a Pitjantjatjara family some time around 1915. He was born in the bush at Pilpirinyi, Western Australia, near the border with South Australia. His childhood was spent living nomadically in the desert with his family. Their homelands were spread over a large area along the border, but they often travelled far to the east for ceremonies. They camped for several years around the Musgrave Ranges near what would later become the settlement of Ernabella. This was prior to the arrival of White people in the area; the family had their first contact with Western civilisation in the 1920s, when Minyintiri was still a child. They encountered a group of men on camels attempting to pull their truck out of a bog.

Minyintiri and his family were present for the establishment of the mission settlement of Ernabella in 1937. They settled on the mission with several other Aboriginal families, and Minyintiri has lived at Ernabella ever since. He worked for most of his life as a shepherd and shearer, but became a widely respected ngangkaṟi (traditional healer) in his later years. He is now one of the most senior elders in his community. Before he became a painter, Minyintiri crafted traditional wooden tools (mostly spears).

Minyintiri began painting at Ernabella Arts in late 2005. He painted at the art centre for a few hours each day, while his wife (now deceased) would wait outside the centre with their dogs. Minyintiri originally painted on paper, but now paints on canvas. His works have been shown in many group exhibitions since 2006, in most major Australian cities. The South Australian Museum was one of the first public galleries to show his work, which it did in a 2007 exhibition.

== Artwork ==
Most of Minyintiri's paintings are done using synthetic polymer paint on canvases, although his earliest paintings were done on paper. His paintings are almost always multi-layered with strong motifs and symbols used to represent landmarks or figures. Each layer represents a different memory or part of a creation story. Because of his old age, Minyintiri only paints six to eight artworks a year. Nearly all of them are large canvases.

His paintings depict sacred stories from his Dreaming. He paints songlines, or the journeys taken by the ancestral beings of his Dreaming country – such as the kanyaḻa (euro), malu (red kangaroo), wiilu (stone-curlew), waru (wallaby) and kaḻaya (emu). His art is often also a reflection of his younger life in the desert, before settling permanently at Ernabella. The religious elements of his works are always obscured, for cultural reasons.

Examples of Minyintiri's work are held in the National Gallery of Victoria, the Art Gallery of South Australia, the Art Gallery of New South Wales, the Queensland Gallery of Modern Art, and the National Gallery of Australia.

=== NATSIAA ===
In 2010, Minyintiri's painting Malukutjina ("Red Kangaroo Tracks") was chosen as a finalist for the 27th National Aboriginal & Torres Strait Islander Art Award. The award was won by Jimmy Donegan, another Pitjantjatjara artist, from Kalka. Minyintiri won the 28th NATSIAA in August 2011, for his painting Kanyalakutjina ("Euro Tracks"). His work was chosen from over 300 entries, which had been reduced to 61 finalists. Minyintiri was about 96 at the time. With Donegan winning the award the year before, it was the second year in a row that an artist from the Aṉangu Pitjantjatjara Yankunytjatjara Lands had won.

Kanyalakutjina is a multi-layered synthetic painting, done on a large canvas. The background is made up of pale yellows and oranges, and is covered with a complex network of thick, ivory-coloured lines. Flashes of blue, black and pink peep through the surface lines. The judges praised Minyintiri for his subtle use of colour. His work was compared to the early batik works of Emily Kngwarreye.

The painting depicts a sacred men's ceremonial site near Pilpirinyi. The network of lines traces the tracks of ancestral spirits (kangaroos, dogs and emu) to important waterholes, where men also went for their ceremonies. Each layer and line is a memory of a journey Minyintiri has made. The painting is therefore a reflection of the artist's years of travelling his country, and an expression of his ancestral relationship to the land.
