= Malpiya Davey =

Aboriginal Australian artist

- Other name: Irpintiri Davey
- Occupation: Artist
- Years active: 2000s – present
- Style: Western Desert painting, ceramics, printmaking

Malpiya Davey, also known as Irpintiri Davey, is an Aboriginal Australian artist from Pukatja, South Australia. She is best known for her ceramic artworks, but she also does painting, printmaking and weaving. Davey works for Ernabella Arts, the community arts co-operative in Pukatja. Ernabella Arts opened a ceramic studio in 2003, and Malpiya has since become one of its most prolific artists. She specialises in ceramic sgraffito.

Malpiya is Pitjantjatjara. Her parents’ country is to the west of Pukatja between Watarru and Iltur, close to the border with Western Australia. She decorates the ceramic with glazed or painted designs. Her designs depict various traditional bush foods from her family's country, such as kampuṟarpa (desert raisins), wayaṉu (quandong) and iḻi (wild figs). These are the subject of many of her sgraffito pieces.

Malpiya's ceramic work has been shown in several major exhibitions around Australia, including at Flinders University, Cudgegong Gallery, Strathnairn Homestead Gallery, and the Museum and Art Gallery of the Northern Territory. It was also featured twice at the annual Desert Mob exhibition in Alice Springs, in 2003 and 2004. Examples are held in the permanent collections of the Grafton Regional Gallery in New South Wales, the Art Gallery of South Australia, and the National Gallery of Australia. The National Museum of Australia also contains examples of Malpiya's screen prints.
