= Walytjatjata =

Coordinates: 25°58′35″S 129°27′57″E

Walytjatjata (also spelled Walytjatjara) is a place in the Northern Territory of Australia that is culturally important to the Pitjantjatjara Aboriginal community. It is located in the far south of the Territory, about 3 km (1.9 mi) away from the border with South Australia. It is surrounded to the north by the western hills of the Mann Ranges. An outstation was built here in the 1980s, although nobody currently lives there permanently. Most of the families associated with the place live in Pipalyatjara, about 30 km (19 mi) to the south-east. The houses there are sometimes used for hunting, foraging, painting and cultural events. Nearby are several rockholes and a sacred rock formation that is associated with the Ngiṉṯaka Tjukurpa.

The name walytjatjara refers to something having an owner in Pitjantjatjara.
