= Margaret Fernie Eaton =

English-American artist

- Born: April 22, 1871; Leamington, England
- Died: July 31, 1963 (age 92); Brooklyn, New York, US
- Education: Art Students League of New York

Margaret Fernie Eaton (22 April 1871—31 July 1963) was an artist, born in England and schooled and worked as an artist in the United States. She created watercolor paintings in her early career, and is best known for her pyrographic works illustrations. She collaborated with her husband, fellow artist Hugh McDougal Eaton, on book-plates and other works of art.

== Early life ==
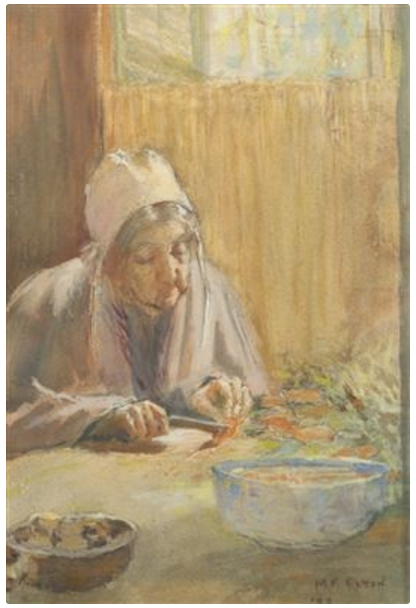
Margaret Fernie Eaton, Doing Her Bit, 1897

Margaret Fernie Eaton was born in Leamington, England on April 22, 1871, the daughter of Benjamin James Fernie and Catherine (McNeil) Fernie. The family moved in 1878 to New York, where Benjamin Fernie became editor of the Christian Herald. Margaret Fernie studied art under J.B. Whitaker in Brooklyn and later attended the Art Students League of New York. Her instructors there included Harry Siddons Mowbray and Kenyon Cox. She also attended Adelphi Academy.

== Career ==
Watercolors she made by 1895 are A Little Picture Book, The Clerk and The Story Book. In 1898, regarding her ability as a watercolor artist, it was said that she "had a rare talent for the human, and her socialistic studies like The China Painter and Left for Retrimming, show increasing power from year to year—both in sight and technic."

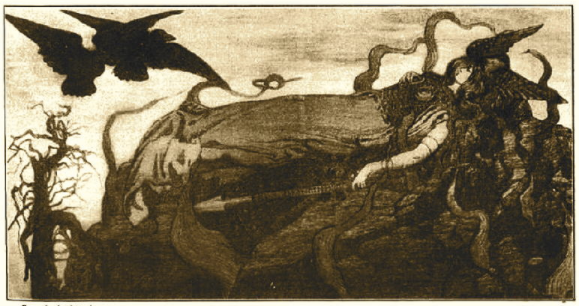
Margaret Fernie Eaton, Brunhilde Asleep, pyrography, 1902

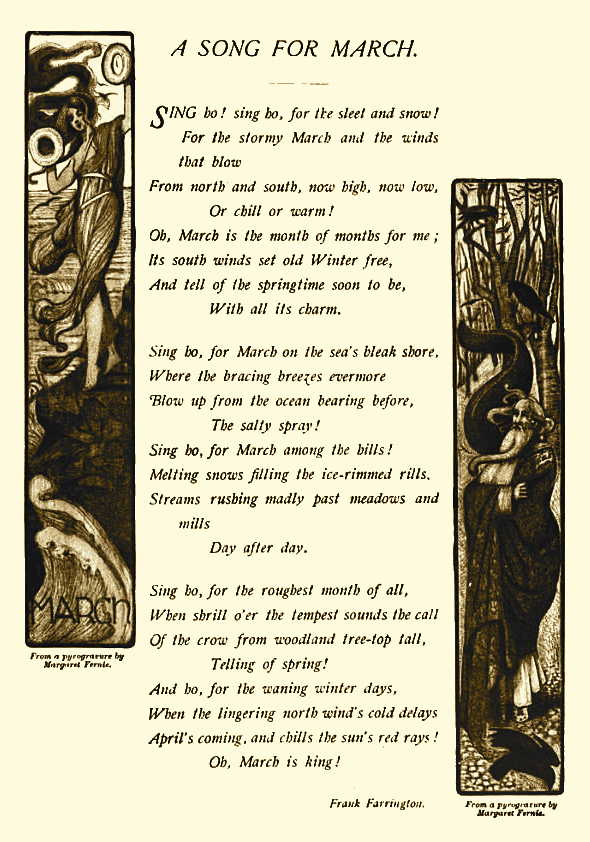
Margaret Fernie Eaton, A Song for March, 1901, March and Winter illustrations for Frank Farrington's poem

Eaton was known for her pyrography works of nude figures that resembled etchings. She is thought to be the first artist to use pyrography for magazine illustrations, like the Winter and March illustrations, and created book covers using pyrography. A noted work is a frieze, Song of the Sea. She and her husband, Hugh M. Eaton, collaborated on their work and shared their Brooklyn workplace, Valhall Studio. The designed book-plates, book binding, illuminations, etchings, and pyrographic works of art. They were also interested in photography. Hugh, who owned a printing press, published illustrations made by the himk and/or his wife. She created architectural panel designs like Song of Iris for a dining room, nursery, and Even-Song to be placed over a mantel. By 1901, she illustrated the story Bettina's Easter Stock and with her husband illustrated Hail and Farewell.

She was a member and vice-president of the Art Students League and a member of the New York Watercolor Club, and exhibited her works there. Both Margaret and Hugh were members of the Black and White Club.

== Personal life ==
Margaret Fernie married Hugh M. Eaton (1865–1924) in 1896. He graduated from the Polytech Institute and studied art in several places, including the Art Students League of New York. He was art manager at Leslie's Weekly and The American Magazine. They lived at 339 Halsey Street in Brooklyn and operated a studio, Valhall Studio, with two of Hugh's sisters. He died on September 14, 1924.

She married Rev. Dr. Frederic W. Norris in Summerville, South Carolina at the St. Paul's Church on November 17, 1929. At that time, Norris was the rector emeritus of St. Matthew's Church in Brooklyn. Norris died on November 22, 1931.

Eaton died in New York City in 1963.
