= Tony Tjamiwa =

Australian Aboriginal elder (died 2001)

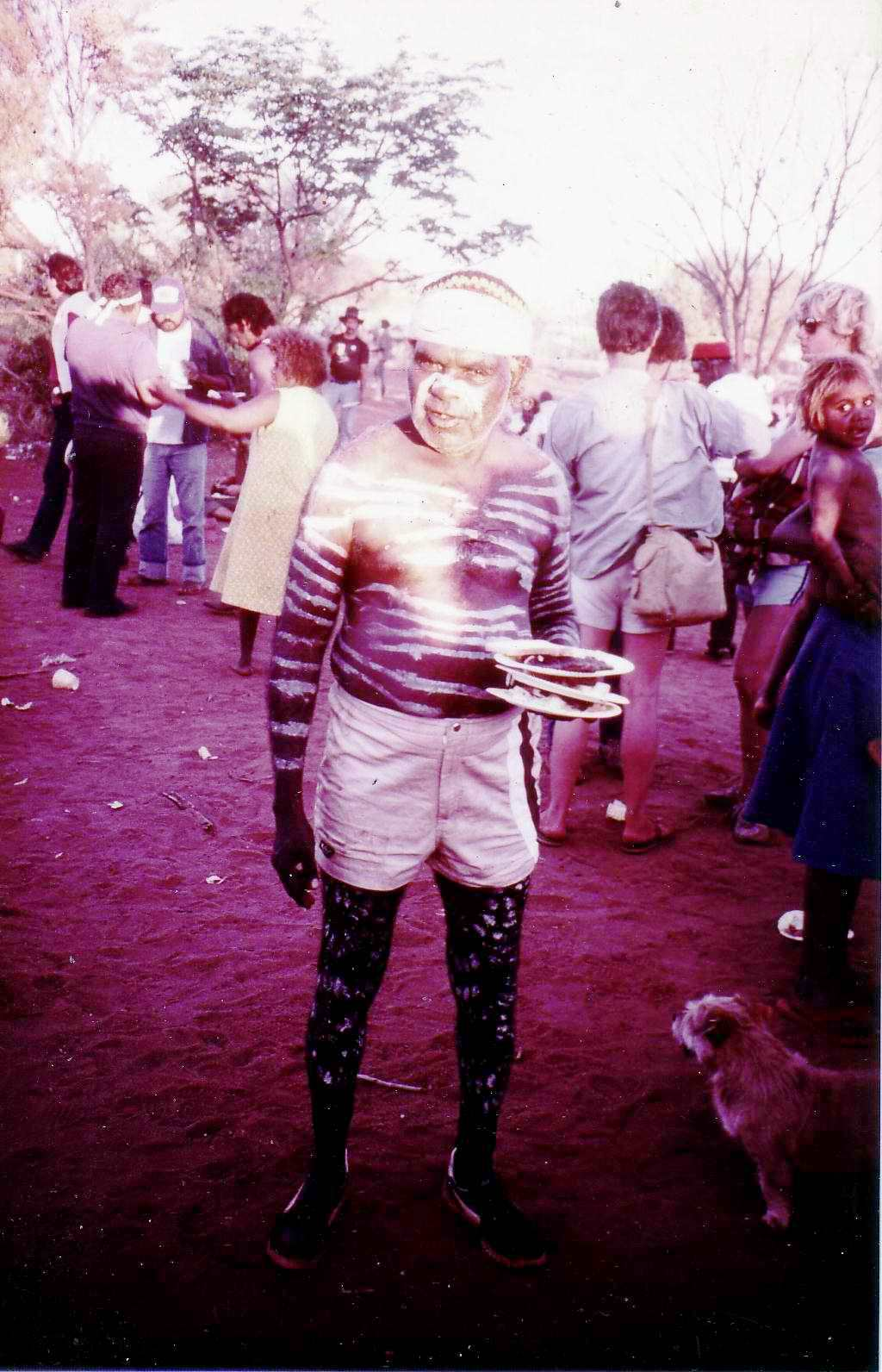
Tjamiwa at the Handback of title ceremony at Uluru 26 October 1985

Tony Tjamiwa (died 12 May 2001), also known as Tony Curtis, was a highly respected elder, traditional healer and storyteller of the Pitjantjatjara people. He was a native speaker of the Pitjantjatjara language.

== Biography ==
Tony Tjamiwa was a senior traditional owner of Uluru and Kata Tjuta and was intimately involved in the long battle for the return of them to his people. He was a board member of the Uluru-Kata Tjuta National Park. His wife was the renowned artist and carver, Pulya Taylor.

It is one Tjukurpa inside the Park and outside the Park-not different. There are very important secret and sacred places in the Park. One line. Everything is one Tjukurpa.

— Tony Tjamiwa

There is strong and powerful Aboriginal Law in this place. There are important songs and stories that we hear from our elders, and we must protect and support this important Law. There are sacred things here and this sacred Law is very important. It was given to us by our grandfathers and grandmothers, our father and mothers, to hold onto in our heads and in our hearts.

— Tony Tjamiwa

The tourist comes here with the camera taking pictures all over. What has he got? Another photo to take home, keep part of Uluru. He should get another lens – see straight inside. Wouldn’t see big rock then. He would see that Kuniya (woma python woman) living right inside there as from the beginning. He might throw his camera away then.

— Tony Tjamiwa

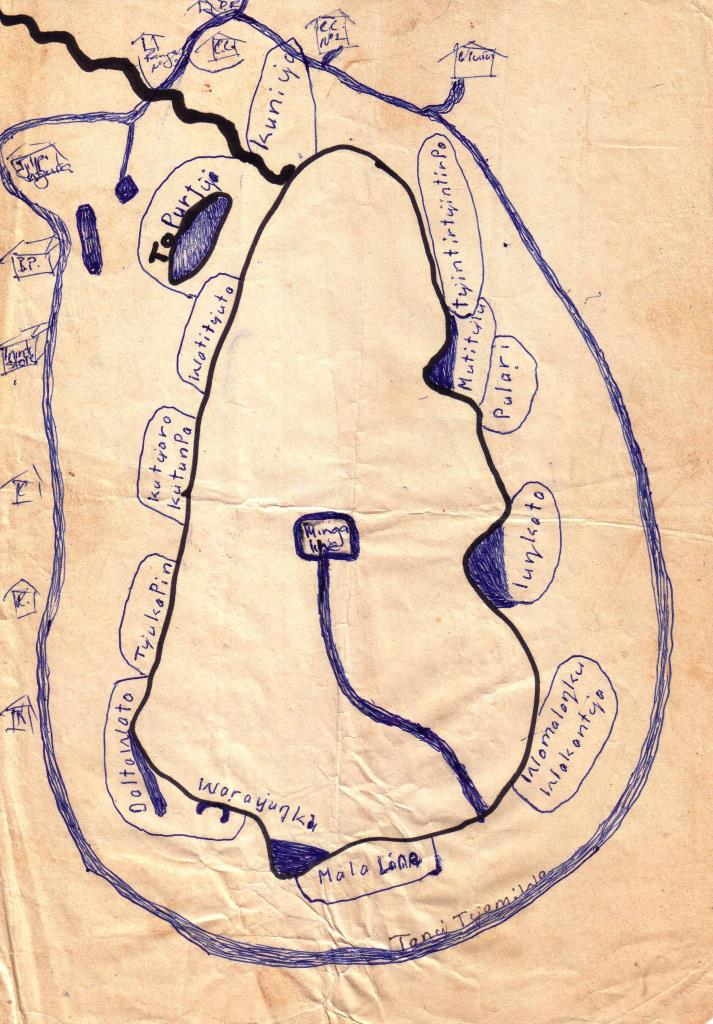
Tjamiwa's map of the main sacred sites around Uluru

== Bibliography ==
- Tony Tjamiwa. 1991. "Ngaṉana Wirunya Tjunguringkula Waakarinyi: We're working well together." Habitat Australia, Vol. 19, No. 3, 3 June 1991. Australian Conservation Foundation, pp. 4–7.
