= Pyrography =

Art or decoration made from burn marks

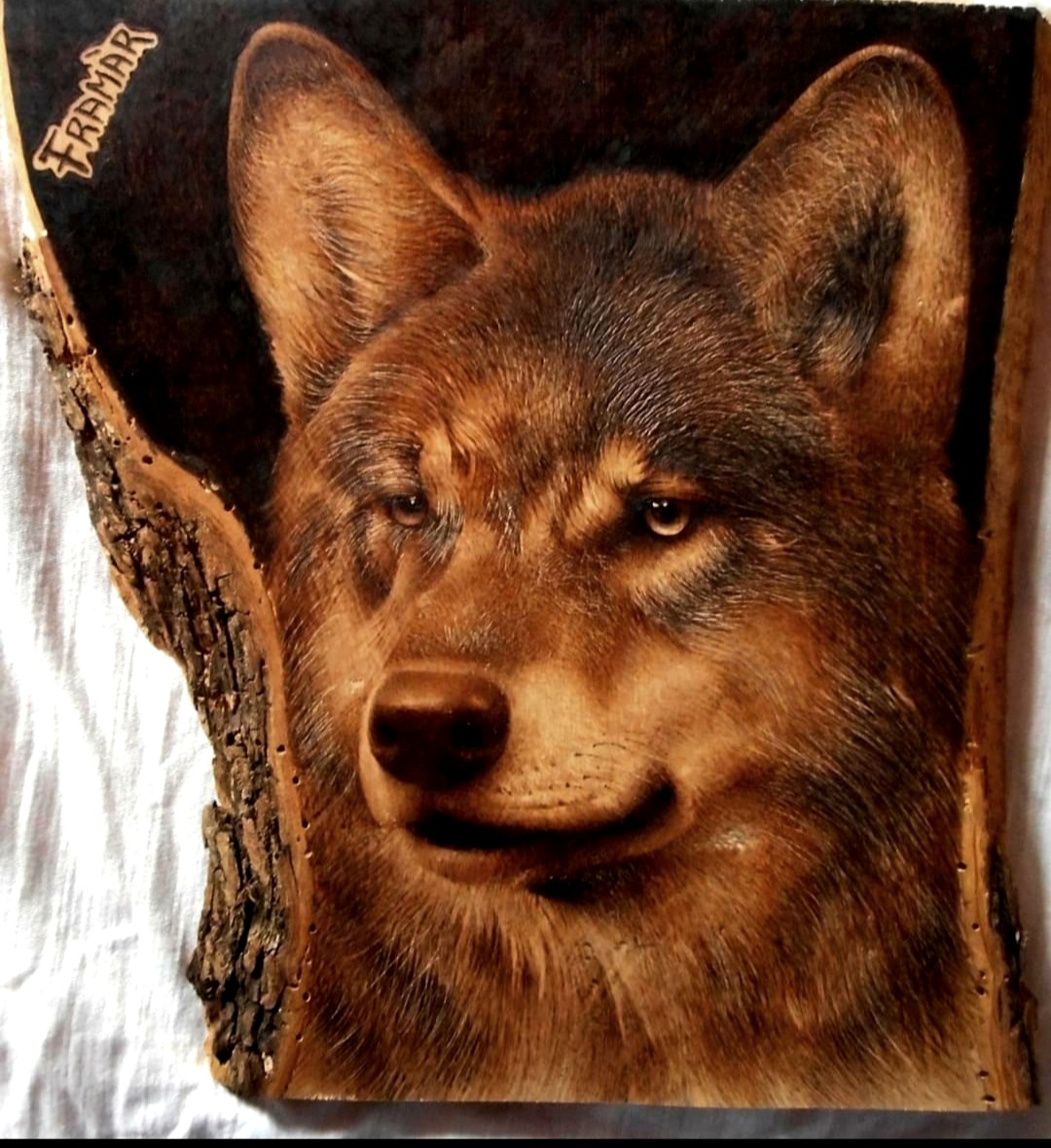
The King Wolf, pyrography on olive wood by Roberto Frangioni Piroritrattista Framàr

Pyrography or pyrogravure is the freehanded art of decorating wood or other materials with burn marks resulting from the controlled application of a heated object such as a poker. It is also known as pokerwork or wood burning.

The term means "writing with fire", derived from the Greek pyr (fire) and graphos (writing). It can be practiced using specialized modern pyrography tools, or using a metal implement heated in a fire, or even sunlight concentrated with a magnifying lens. "Pyrography dates from the 17th century and reached its highest standard in the 19th century. In its crude form it is pokerwork."

Pyrography is also popular among gourd crafters and artists, where designs are burned onto the exterior of a dried hard-shell gourd.

== History ==
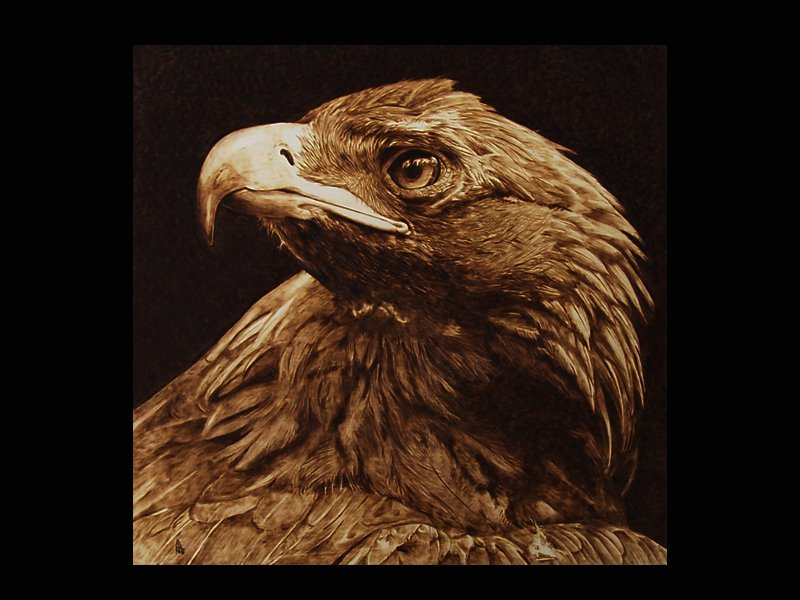
The Tawny Eagle. Davide Della Noce pyrography.

Pyrographer Robert Boyer hypothesizes that the art form dates back to prehistory when early humans created designs using the charred remains of their fires. It was known in China from the time of the Han dynasty, where it was known as "Fire Needle Embroidery". During the Victorian era, the invention of pyrography machines sparked a widespread interest in the craft, and it was at this time that the term "pyrography" was coined (previously the name "pokerwork" had been most widely used) In the late 19th century, a Melbourne architect by the name of Alfred Smart discovered that water-based paint could be applied hot to wood by pumping benzoline fumes through a heated hollow platinum pencil. This improved the pokerwork process by allowing the addition of tinting and shading, which had previously been impossible. In the early 20th century, the development of the electric hot-wire wood-etching machine further automated the pokerwork process, and Art Nouveau pyrographic gloveboxes and other works proved popular during that era. Pyrography is a traditional folk art in many parts of Europe, including Romania, Poland, Hungary, and Flanders, as well as Argentina and other areas in South America.

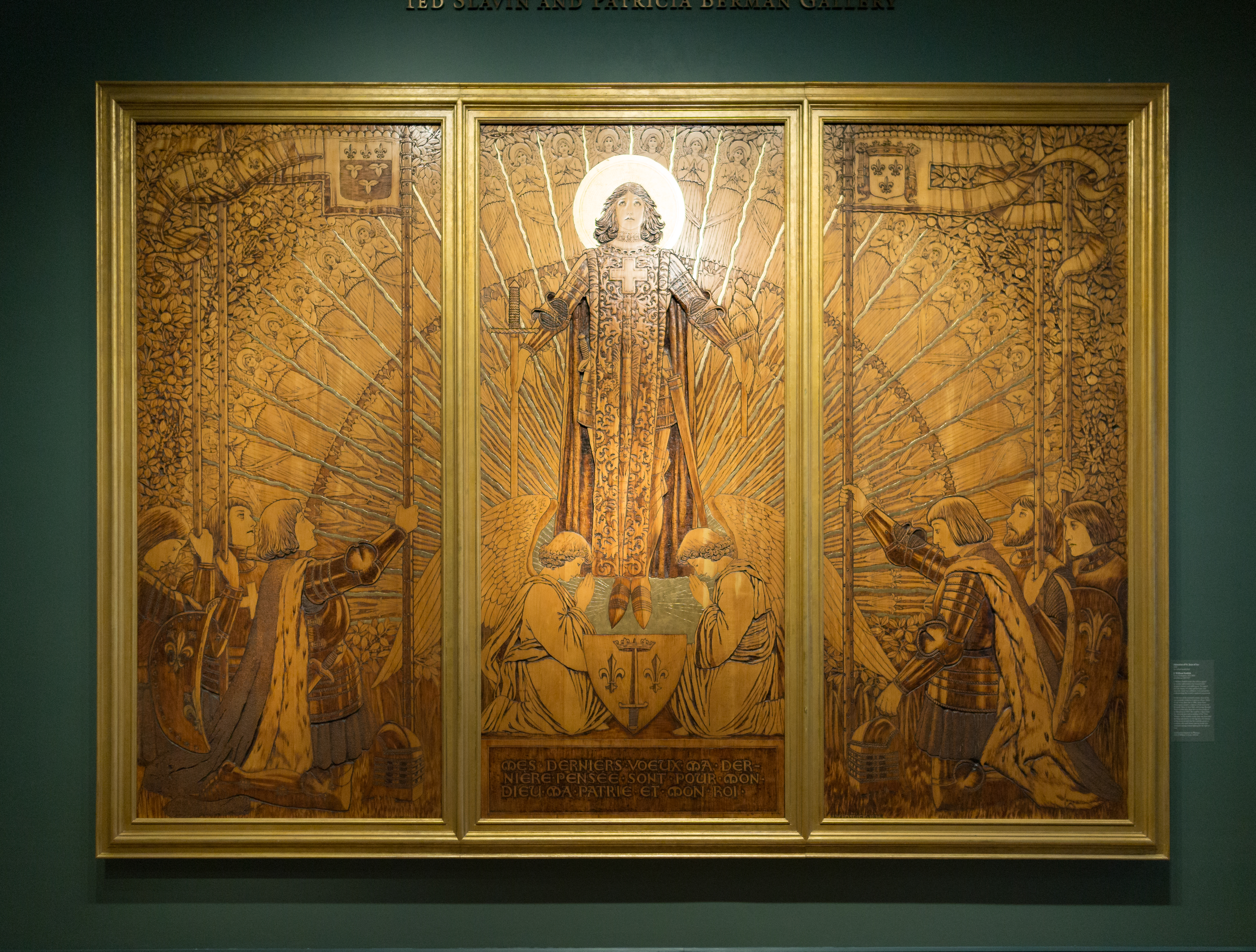
The Adoration of St. Joan of Arc, J.W. Fosdick, 1896

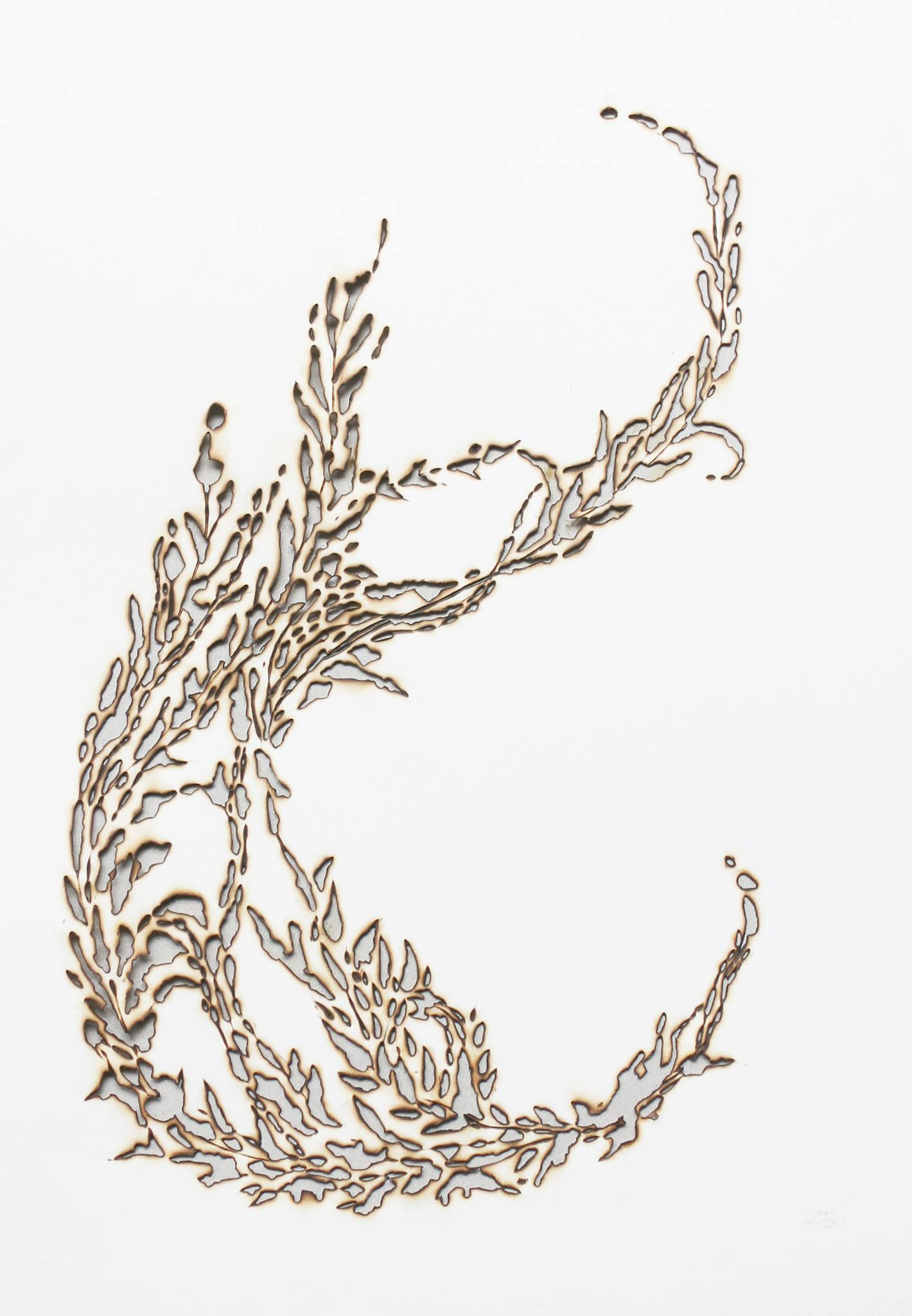
Herbarium, pyrographic artwork by Zuzanna Dolega, 2019

== Equipment ==
Traditional pyrography can be performed using any heated metal implement. Modern pyrography machines exist, and can be divided into three main categories.

A large range of tones and shades can be achieved. Varying the type of tip used, the temperature, or the way the iron is applied to the material all create different effects. After the design is burned in, wooden objects are often coloured.

=== Solid-point burners ===
Solid-point burners are similar in design to a soldering iron. They have a solid brass tip which is heated by an electrical element, and operate at a fixed temperature.

=== Wire-nib burners ===
Wire-nib burners have variable temperature controls. The writing nib is heated by an electric current passing directly through it. Some models have interchangeable nibs to allow for different effects.

=== Laser cutters ===
Laser cutters can be set to scorch the material instead of cutting all the way through it. Many laser cutters provide software facilities to import image files and transfer them onto a sheet of wood. Some laser systems are sufficiently sensitive to perform pyrography on thin card or even paper.

=== Woods ===
Woods differ in hardness, grain, figure, texture, color, and other physical characteristics.

Hardness: All woods can be classified into hard or soft. Usually softwoods are from coniferous (needle-leaved) trees.

Hardwoods are from broad-leaved trees. These hardwood trees can be classified into two distinct growing seasons each year (hot and cold season or a wet and dry season) such as:

- Earlywood: normally lighter in color and weight and only moderately strong
- Latewood: usually heavier, darker, and much stronger.

Softwood will burn faster than a hardwood does. It does not require very hot temperature to burn as do the hardwoods.

Light-coloured hardwoods such as sycamore, basswood, beech and birch are most commonly used, as their fine grain is not obtrusive. However, other woods, such as maple, pine or oak, are also used.

Grain: Grain is the direction of the fibrous elements of the wood cells. This is important to sand with the grain. Also the grain can cause deviation from its intended path with use of woodturning pen unless the artist applies more pressure and burns slower on the grain.

Figure: This is the natural design, or pattern, that can be seen on the cut surface of the wood. The figure present on the wood should always be taken into consideration when the artist is planning their woodburned design.

Texture: There is a texture on the surface of that wood that feels either coarse or fine, even or uneven.

Woodburners typically avoid using very fine or intricate designs on uneven, coarse-textured wood. Softwoods are more apt to be fine or moderately coarse-textured.

Color: Woodburning is mainly used to enhance the natural beauty of a wooden project, so woodburners take precious care not to obfuscate a beautiful figure, grain, luster, or color by over-charring.

== Leather ==
Pyrography is also applied to leather items, using the same hot-iron technique. Leather lends itself to bold designs, and also allows very subtle shading to be achieved. Specialist vegetable-tanned leather must be used for pyrography (as modern tanning methods leave chemicals in the leather which are toxic when burned), typically in light colours for good contrast.

== Safety ==
Extremely fine wood dust is liberated when sanding wood; all wood dust is hazardous, flammable, and can cause respiratory problems. For this reason, many woodburners wear quality dust masks or respirators while power carving, and use a good dust collection system to prevent indoor air pollution.

More specifically concerning pyrography itself, there are serious risks associated with burning pressure-treated wood, which has been treated with chemicals that, although safely bound in the wood fibers when used for construction purposes, are inherently dangerous to woodworkers and woodburners when liberated through sanding or vaporized by heat. Similar dangers are inherent to stained, painted, or sealed wood as well. A well ventilated room with a running fan will encourage air circulation and displace lingering smoke.

Fractal burning is a specific pyrography technique which utilises extremely high voltage electric current. It is known to be extremely dangerous and has resulted in dozens of documented deaths, and several more near-death cases of severe and often disfiguring injury.

== Gallery ==
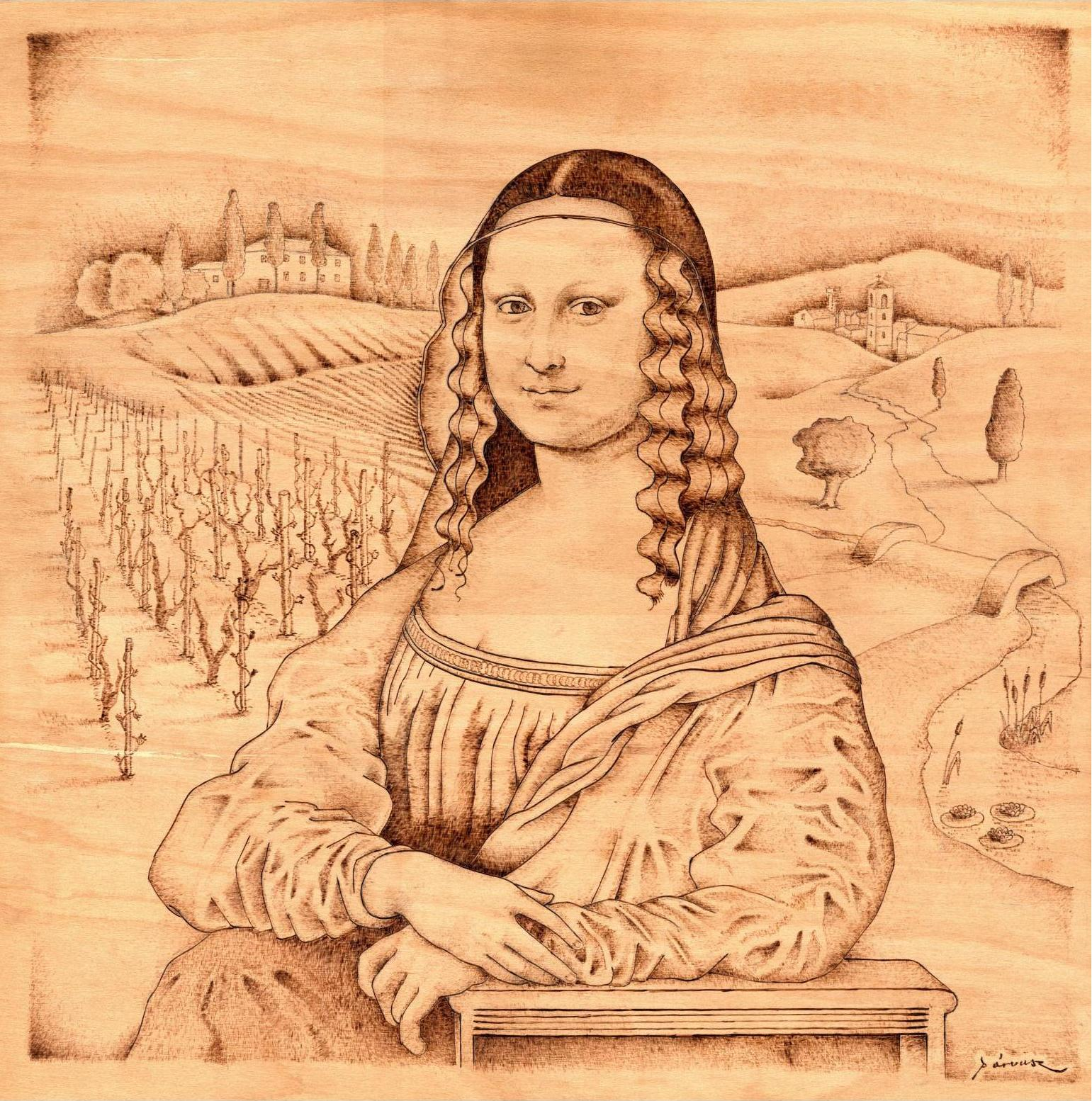
Pyrography artwork of the Mona Lisa by Párvusz, 2009

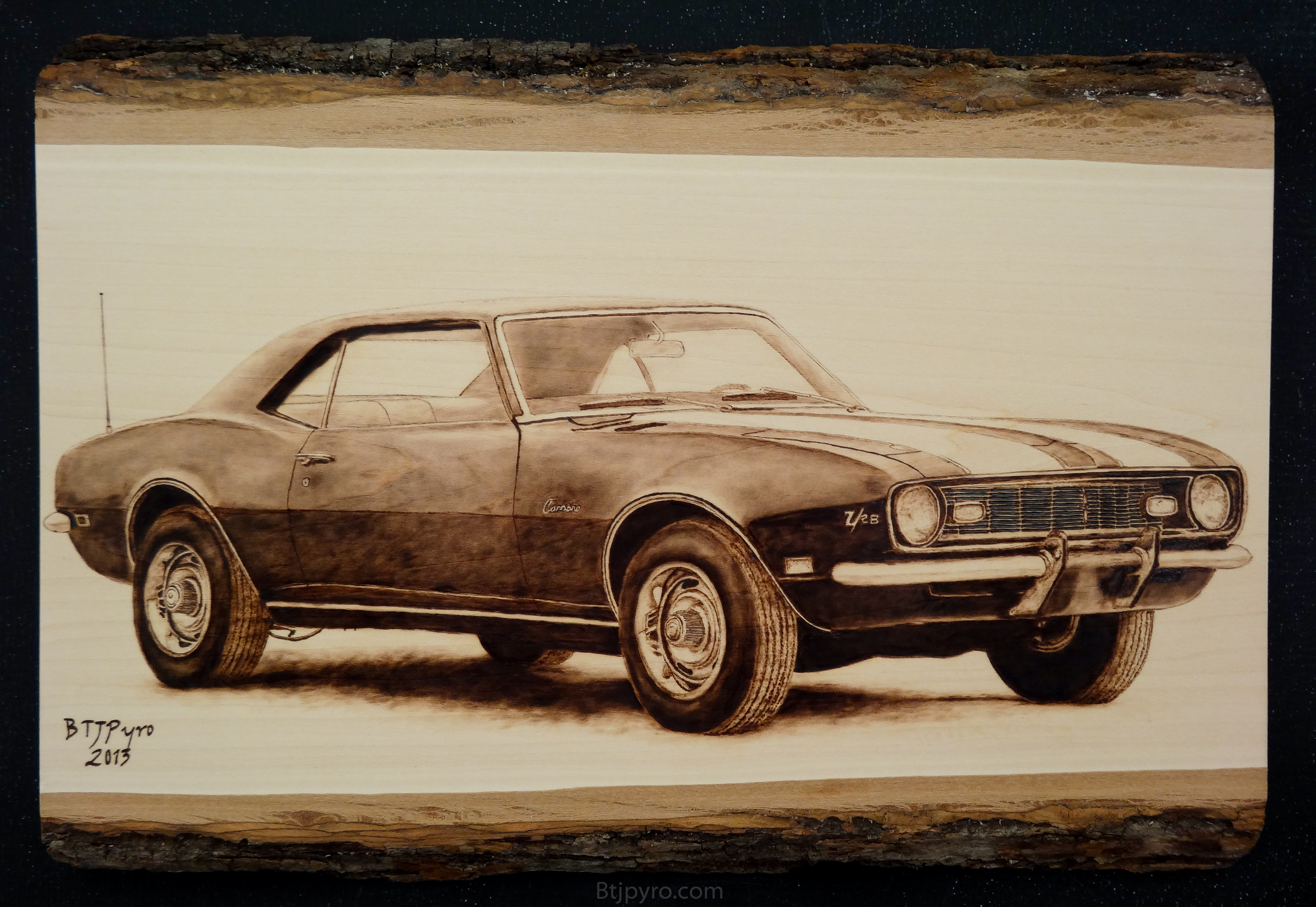
1968 Chevrolet Camaro Z/28 by BTJPyro, 2013

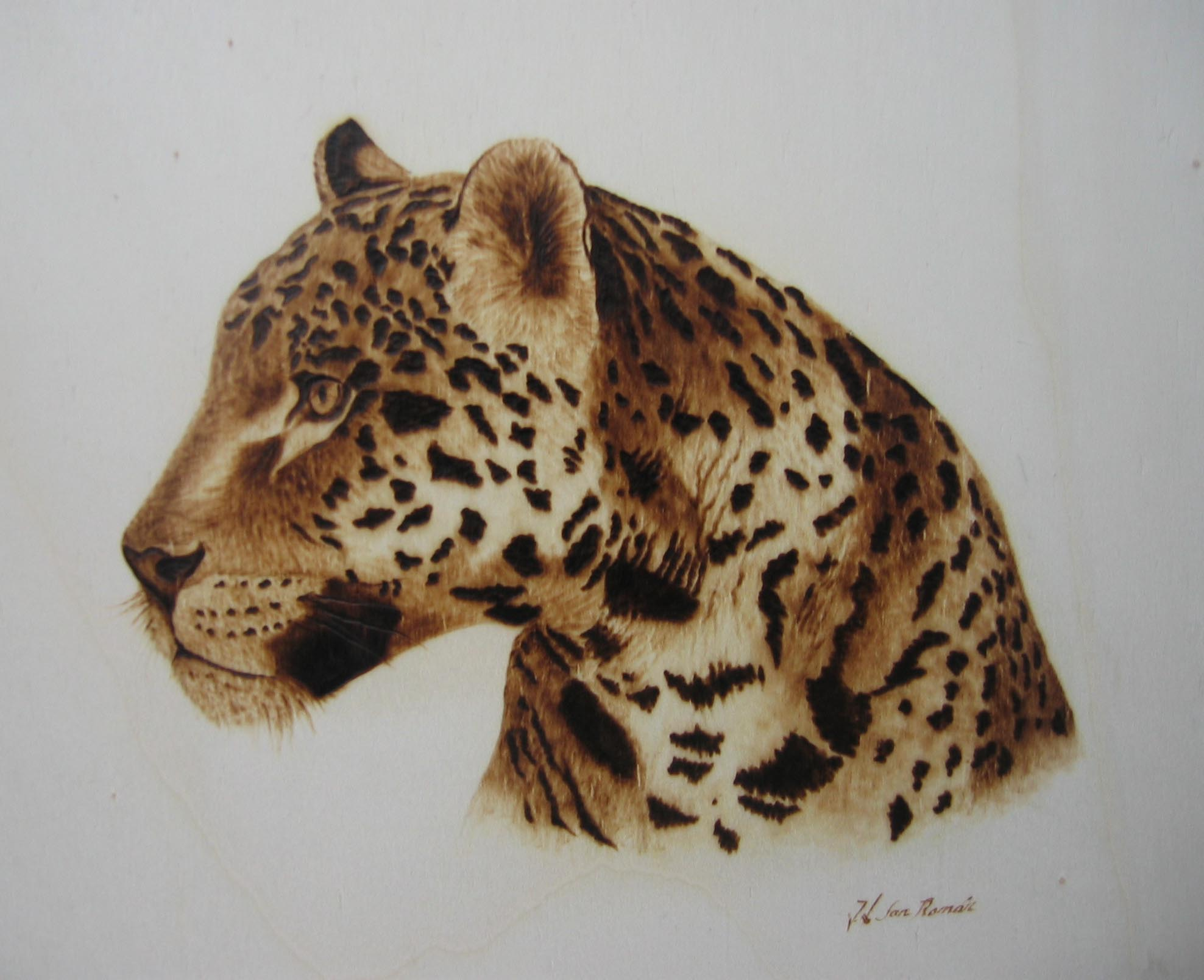
Leopardo, José Luis San Román, 2004

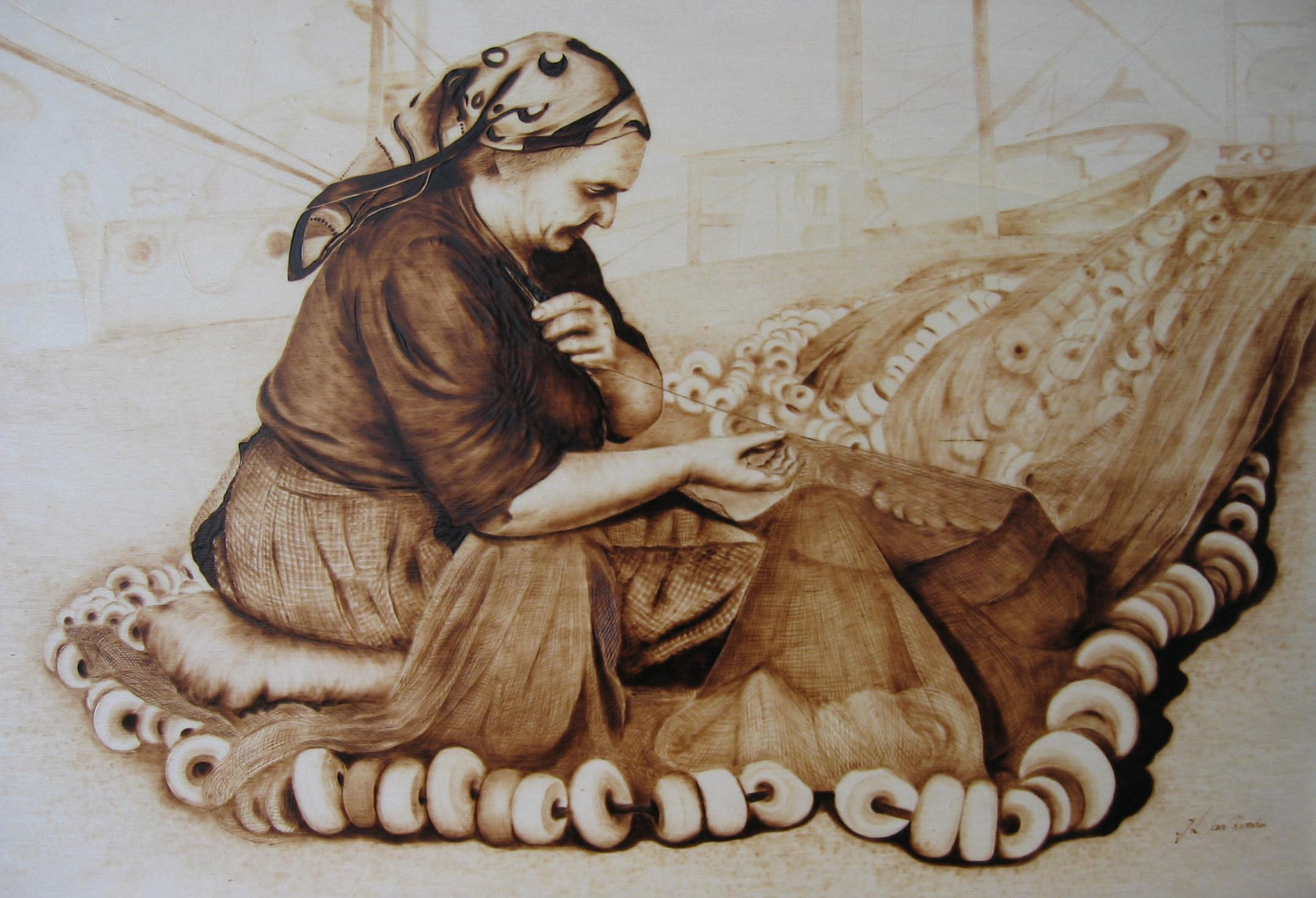
Cosiendo redes, José Luis San Román, 2004

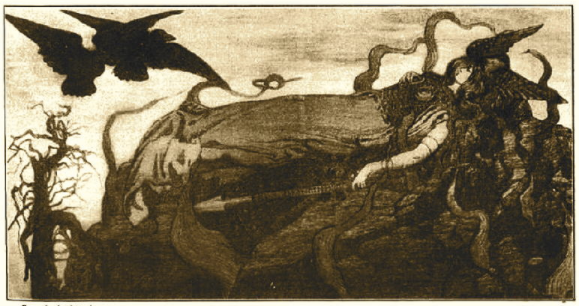
Brunhilde Asleep, Margaret Fernie Eaton, 1902

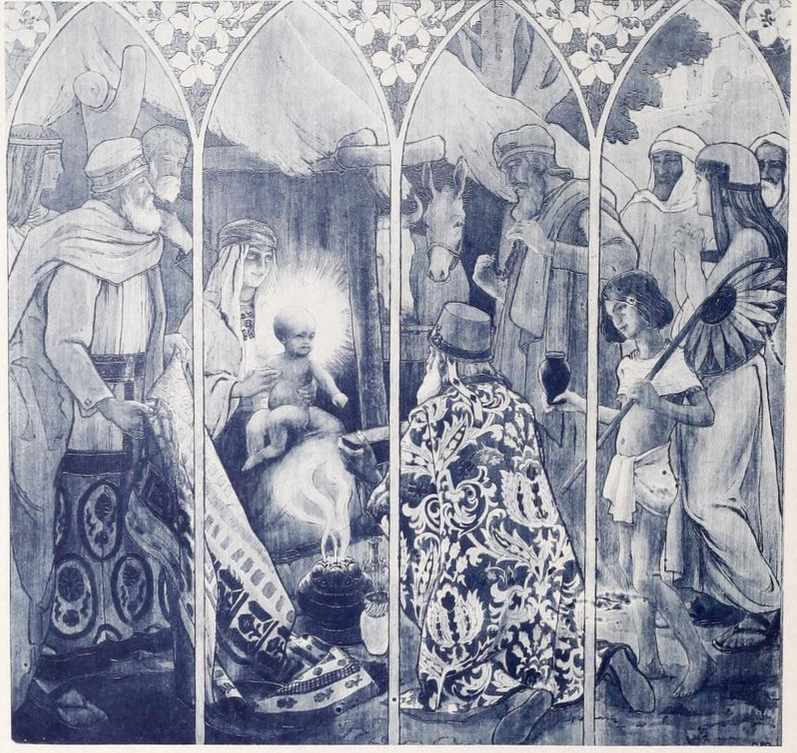
Adoration des Mages, Gaston Marquet, 1901
