= Pukatja, South Australia =

Pukatja (Ernabella)
- Town
- Coordinates: 26°17′12″S 132°07′59″E
- Country: Australia
- State: South Australia
- Region: Far North
- LGA: Anangu Pitjantjatjara Yankunytjatjara
- Established: c. 1938

Government
  - State electorate: Giles
  - Federal division: Grey
- Elevation: 676 m (2,218 ft)

Population
  - Total: 412 (2016 census)
- Postcode: 0872
- Mean max temp: 26.8 °C (80.2 °F)
- Mean min temp: 11.8 °C (53.2 °F)
- Annual rainfall: 274.3 mm (10.80 in)

Pukatja (formerly Ernabella, Pitjantjatjara: Anapala) is an Aboriginal community in the Anangu Pitjantjatjara Yankunytjatjara Lands in South Australia, comprising one of the six main communities on "The Lands" (the others being Amata, Pipalyatjara, Fregon/Kaltjiti, Indulkana and Mimili).

Established as a Presbyterian mission in 1937 with unintrusive practices which maintained the Pitjantjatjara language at the school and church services, Ernabella was handed over to the community in 1974 and was later named Pukatja. Ernabella Arts is Australia's oldest continuously running Indigenous art centre.

== Time zone ==
Due to its links with the Northern Territory and proximity to the border, the APY Lands do not observe daylight savings unlike the rest of South Australia. The time zone observed throughout the year is Australian Central Standard Time (UTC+9:30), in line with Darwin rather than Adelaide.

== Geography ==
Pukatja is in the eastern Musgrave Ranges, west of the Stuart Highway, about 30 kilometres (19 mi) south of the Northern Territory border, about 330 kilometres (210 mi) south-west of Alice Springs and 25 kilometres (16 mi) north of Umuwa, the major administrative centre within the APY Lands. It is about 1,400 kilometres (870 mi) by road from Adelaide.

The community sits at an elevation of about 703 metres (2,306 ft).

The area is prone to earthquakes, one of few areas of Australia to have experienced multiple large earthquakes in recorded history. In 2012 and 2013, the town experienced a 5.7 magnitude earthquake, classified as "moderate" on the Richter scale and the country's two largest earthquakes in those years.

== Population ==
In the 2016 Australian census, the population was 412, down from 503 in 2011.

In the 2001 census, Pukatja had 226 residents, and was second only to sister community Mimili in having the lowest per capita income in South Australia ($174). Like a number of APY Lands communities, Pukatja has one of the highest proportions of Australian-born residents (97.5%).

== History ==
=== Mission ===
Ernabella was a pastoral lease before it was established as a Presbyterian mission station for Aboriginal people in 1937, driven by medical doctor and Aboriginal rights campaigner Charles Duguid (then president of the Aborigines Protection League) and supported by the South Australian government.

Ernestine Hill, after travelling in the area in the 1930s, wrote that colonisation only began there when the collection of dingo scalps (to help protect the sheep) by "doggers" started. Relationships of various types developed between the doggers and the local people, with the Aboriginal people's superior skills used to hunt collect the scalps, for which they were paid in rations, clothing and other goods. Some doggers cohabited with the local women, and sometimes groups of Anangu travelled with the doggers or set themselves up as doggers in their own right. There was a number of pastoral leases on the edge of the Western Desert, established from the 1880s, but development was marginal in the Musgrave Ranges area. Farming in these arid lands was labour-intensive, and an interdependence between the pastoralists and Aboriginal people developed.

On a trip to Ernabella in 1935, Duguid noticed discrimination and heard reports of abuse of Aboriginal men's labour and the sexual abuse of women. He advocated the establishment of a mission "to act as a buffer between the Aborigines and the encroaching white settlers". In 1936 he persuaded the General Assembly of the Presbyterian Church to purchase the Ernabella lease, an area of 500 square miles (1,300 km^{2}), despite some opposition from other members (including John Flynn). Duguid laid down the following principles for the mission: "There was to be no compulsion nor imposition of our way of life on the Aborigines, nor deliberate interference with tribal custom ... only people trained in some particular skill should be on the mission staff, and ... they must learn the tribal language.

The mission respected the culture and traditions of the Pitjantjatjara and Yankunytjatjara people, the two groups of the large Western Desert language bloc who now call themselves Anangu, and offered medical help and education, with no conditions attached. Author and researcher Carol Pybus wrote that the Ernabella Mission did not interfere with tribal life, and many of the Aboriginal people "regard the mission times and their relationship with missionaries in a positive light", and enjoyed a spiritual life which blended Christianity with their beliefs and practices. Children were never separated from their families.

The desert people had always been highly mobile, and shared Dreamtime stories and other aspects of culture; during the drought of 1914–1915, people had come from the Mann Ranges area and stayed in the area. There was no need for the missionaries to entice people to the Mission; people moved there on their own accord. Some saw it as a place of care and protection from exploitation. The Mission encouraged independence and supported the sometime-residents' nomadic way of life. Duguid's idea of a "buffer zone", however, was a two-edged sword. In hindsight, although it created a safe space, it also entrenched the boundary and perhaps widened the gap between people at the Mission and wider society.

The first school building was completed in 1940, and was unique in South Australia in that English was not taught as the first language; it was only introduced as a second language in 1944. "Writing, reading and spelling, arithmetic, hygiene, drawing, singing, gardening, woodwork and sewing, geography and Nature Study" were all taught in Pitjantjatjara. Enrolment rose from 25 in 1940 to 200 in 1943, with daily attendance of about 45, with no compulsion to attend. Hymns and parts of the Bible were translated into Pitjantjatjara.

In the early 1950s, Superintendent Ron Trudinger wrote of a "tribal home", and there was talk of a "Native Village". Through the 1950s, cultural changes did occur, with traditional ways dropped and new practices adopted. The first baptisms took place in 1952, to the sound of hymns sung in Pitjantjatjara, but there was little proselytising, and old ways co-existed alongside the new.

Staff at the Mission stayed for long periods: apart from Trudinger (1940–1957), there was James Robert Beattie Love (1937–1946), Bill Edwards (1958–1972), John Bennett (25 years overseeing the sheep enterprise), and Deaconess Winifred Hilliard coordinated the Ernabella Craft centre (now Ernabella Arts) from 1954 to 1974 and continued to work for Ernabella Arts until 1986. There was deep respect and affection between the people and the staff; Hilliard was buried there, and a large contingent of Ernabella people, including the Choir, attended Edwards' funeral in Adelaide in 2015.

In 1972, the community elders, who called Duguid "Tjilpi" ("respected old man"), wrote to him saying that they wanted him to be buried at Ernabella "so that Aborigines will always remember that he was one of us and that he faithfully helped us". Duguid regarded this as a great compliment, and after his death on 5 December 1986, his body was flown to Ernabella and buried among his friends in the Mission Cemetery.

=== Handover to community ===
Responsibility for the administration of Ernabella Mission was formally handed over to the Ernabella Community Council – later Pukatja Community Council – on 1 January 1974.

The settlement was funded by the federal government as an outstation during the 1980s.

== Heritage-listed buildings ==
The former Ernabella Mission Hospital, Church and Manse are listed on the South Australian Heritage Register.

== Ernabella Arts ==
Established in 1948, Ernabella Arts remains in operation, as Australia's oldest continuously running Indigenous Art Centre.

During the 1950s and 1960s, art and craft using locally produced wool was the predominant artistic form produced by the Ernabella artists. Batik was successfully introduced after several Ernabella artists travelled to Indonesia in the 1970s. The Ernabella artists are renowned for their batik work and printmaking. A substantial collection of Ernabella art can be seen at the National Museum of Australia, including a range of fine ceramics also produced by the Ernabella artists.

In recent years, female elders have started to depict their Tjukurpa (sacred stories of country and law) in their art. Artists both young and old, including some very senior men and women, work at the centre. The award-winning Dickie Minyintiri was perhaps the most well-known artist to work there. Other artists associated with Ernabella Arts include Yilpi Adamson, Milyika Carroll, Malpiya Davey, Angkuna Kulyuru, Nura Rupert, Tjunkaya Tapaya, and Harry Tjutjuna.

Ernabella Arts is one of ten Indigenous-owned and -governed enterprises that go to make up the APY Art Centre Collective, established in 2013.

== Facilities ==
A permit is required for visitors to any community on the APY Lands, as they are freehold lands owned by the Aboriginal people.

As of July 2019 a major road upgrade, funded by federal and state governments, has been under way since 2016. 210 kilometres (130 mi) of the Main Access Road between the Stuart Highway and Pukatja are being improved to improve general road safety, communications, food delivery, emergency service access and community interaction. The airstrip access road is also being upgraded. By May 2019, a total of 54 kilometres (34 mi) had been constructed, including the Pukatja Airstrip Access Road, a 7 kilometres (4.3 mi) section from the Stuart Highway to Iwantja (Indulkana), and the 43 kilometres (27 mi) section (Stage 1) between Pukatja and Umuwa.

The Ernabella Anangu School offers reception through to senior high school. Technical and Further Education (TAFE) facilities for the APY Lands are based at Pukatja and the other centres.

The old Pukatja police station, which was not permanently staffed, was in poor condition and due for replacement in July 2007. A month later the State Government announced that it would spend A$7.5 million at Amata and Pukatja for new police stations, court facilities and cells along with associated police housing and facilities. The new, permanently staffed facilities were opened in March 2010, staffed by one sergeant, three constables and a Police Aboriginal Liaison Officer. The police officers' duties include liaison with and participation in the school, football team and local Country Fire Service (CFS) activities.

There are telephones (landline and smartphones), ADSL internet access, and multiple television channels including SBS Television, NITV, Imparja and ABC, and mail is delivered twice weekly by air from Alice Springs.

As of 2019 the supermarket is run by the Pukatja Supermarket & Associated Stores Aboriginal Corporation.

The Uniting Church in Australia has a congregation in Pukatja.

After a long wait, a swimming pool was finally opened in January 2025.

=== Health ===
A new health clinic was built in 2009, with extensions completed in 2012. The Nganampa Health Council (NHC), an Aboriginal Community-Controlled Health Organisation, runs all of the clinics in the APY lands and runs a wide range of services.

In 2014, a Mobile Dialysis Unit, a specially designed truck fitted with three dialysis chairs started operation, visiting remote Aboriginal communities across South Australia, including Pukatja, Mimili, Kaltjiti and Amata in the APY lands, as well as Marla, Yalata, Coober Pedy, and Leigh Creek. It is run from Purple House, a renal health clinic in Alice Springs, over 400 kilometres (250 mi) away. In July 2018, Health Minister Greg Hunt and Ken Wyatt, then Minister for Indigenous Health, announced increased funding for a number of health initiatives, including expanding renal health units in remote parts, through the National Health and Medical Research Council (NHMRC).

In November 2019, a four-bed dialysis clinic was opened in Pukatja, named after Kinyin Mckenzie, who died in Alice Springs while receiving dialysis. The first such clinic in remote South Australia, it was funded mostly by the federal government, but boosted by the sale of paintings by Ernabella Arts, which raised A$170,000 towards the centre. At full capacity, the clinic can provide dialysis for up to 16 patients, but there is still a need for some short-stay housing to accommodate those who travel from elsewhere for treatment at Pukatja.

== Fauna ==
=== Warru ===
In October 2007 it was reported that the black-flanked rock wallaby, known as warru to the local population, faced extinction, and that 15 of the wallabies had been transferred from an undisclosed location on the APY Lands and also from Pukatja, to Monarto Zoo (now Monarto Safari Park). It had been estimated that there were only about 50 of the animals left in the wild. Work to monitor the species' survival was said to involve Aboriginal trackers and schoolchildren from Pukatja to help track the wallabies' movements.

Previously widespread throughout the ranges of central Australia, the warru is as of July 2019 South Australia's most endangered mammal, primarily due to predation by foxes and feral cats. However Monarto Safari Park has had some success in breeding the wallabies, and has helped to establish a viable population (22) of the wallabies in a 1 square kilometre (0.39 sq mi) fenced area, known as the Pintji, in the APY lands. In June 2017 the zoo announced that 25 of the population bred at Pintji, along with 15 others, had been released into the wild. These will be monitored and feral animal control measures are in place.

== Climate ==
Climate records for Ernabella/Pukatja have been kept since 1971. Due to its elevation high in the Musgrave Ranges, Pukatja is one of the coldest locations in central Australia. Minimum temperatures may drop below −5 °C (23 °F) with heavy frost and daytime maximum temperatures below 10 °C (50 °F) may occur each winter. Summers are still hot, however Pukatja does not experience the scorching 45 °C (113 °F) plus summer maximum temperatures typical of most of inland South Australia. Average January maximums are 34.5 °C (94.1 °F) and this drops to 17.8 °C (64.0 °F) in June. Overnight lows range from a mean minimum temperature of 19.7 °C (67.5 °F) in January to 3.3 °C (37.9 °F) in June. Annual rainfall averages 275.2 millimetres (10.83 in), which is typical of an arid climate, and mostly falls from brief summer thunderstorms.

Climate data for Ernabella/Pukatja, SA
Month	Jan	Feb	Mar	Apr	May	Jun	Jul	Aug	Sep	Oct	Nov	Dec	Year
Record high °C (°F)	43.0 (109.4)	42.9 (109.2)	43.0 (109.4)	38.5 (101.3)	34.0 (93.2)	27.7 (81.9)	29.3 (84.7)	32.2 (90.0)	36.8 (98.2)	39.4 (102.9)	41.2 (106.2)	43.5 (110.3)	43.5 (110.3)
Mean daily maximum °C (°F)	34.5 (94.1)	33.5 (92.3)	31.3 (88.3)	26.4 (79.5)	21.3 (70.3)	18.2 (64.8)	17.8 (64.0)	20.2 (68.4)	24.4 (75.9)	28.4 (83.1)	31.3 (88.3)	34.0 (93.2)	26.8 (80.2)
Mean daily minimum °C (°F)	19.7 (67.5)	19.2 (66.6)	16.6 (61.9)	11.6 (52.9)	7.2 (45.0)	4.6 (40.3)	3.3 (37.9)	4.6 (40.3)	8.6 (47.5)	12.6 (54.7)	16.0 (60.8)	18.6 (65.5)	11.8 (53.2)
Record low °C (°F)	7.0 (44.6)	7.0 (44.6)	6.3 (43.3)	1.7 (35.1)	−2.5 (27.5)	−5.5 (22.1)	−7.6 (18.3)	−4.9 (23.2)	−2.0 (28.4)	0.3 (32.5)	4.5 (40.1)	8.5 (47.3)	−7.6 (18.3)
Average precipitation mm (inches)	43.7 (1.72)	35.5 (1.40)	26.6 (1.05)	19.5 (0.77)	19.1 (0.75)	16.8 (0.66)	12.3 (0.48)	14.0 (0.55)	11.9 (0.47)	23.9 (0.94)	21.8 (0.86)	29.1 (1.15)	274.3 (10.80)
Average precipitation days	3.5	3.3	3.0	2.5	3.3	3.4	2.3	2.8	2.2	3.5	4.4	3.9	38.1
Source: The Bureau of Meteorology
