= William Gosse =

William Gosse may refer to:

- William Gosse (explorer) (1842-1881), Australian explorer
- William Gosse (surgeon), his father, medical practitioner in South Australia
- William Gosse (MP) for Bridgwater (UK Parliament constituency)

== See also ==
- William Gosse Hay, brother-in-law and nephew of William Christie Gosse
- William Goss (disambiguation)
