= Robert Waters Moore =

Irish-born Australian surgeon

Robert Waters Moore M.R.C.S. (1819 – 6 December 1884) born in Cork, Ireland, was a prominent surgeon and medical practitioner in the early days of the colony of South Australia. He succeeded Dr. William Gosse as Colonial Surgeon.

== History ==
Moore's father was a member of a well-known family in County Limerick, and was a graduate of Trinity College, Dublin. He began the study of medicine in the South Infirmary at Cork in 1835, and in 1840 he commenced working at the Charing Cross Hospital, London, where two years later he was appointed Demonstrator of Anatomy. In August, 1842, he was admitted to the Royal College of Surgeons. He also gained experience at the Westminster Ophthalmic Hospital, and in the year 1845 he took his degree as Doctor of Medicine. In 1846 he migrated to New South Wales, where he gained employment as medical assistant for the notorious entrepreneur Benjamin Boyd of Twofold Bay. While with Boyd Dr. Moore met Oswald Brierly, the artist, who accompanied the Duke of Edinburgh on his visit to South Australia in 1867. Dr. Moore came to South Australia in 1847, and took up a practice in Burra, where he was appointed medical officer to the mines, holding this position for about three years.

In 1851 he married Luduvine Dutton, daughter of William Hampden Dutton, and niece of Francis Stacker Dutton, who was for some time Agent-General of South Australia. This was shortly before the gold rush to Victoria, when around 1,500 men left South Australia for the goldfields, and a report published about the time states that the "streets of Adelaide were deserted, houses were abandoned by their tenants, property was unmarketable, and a general arrest put on all business". Dr. Moore was one of those who remained and in 1858 was selected by the then Government to act as Colonial Surgeon to replace Dr. William Gosse, who had resigned, also as Superintendent of the Lunatic Asylum and President of the Medical Board and membership of the Vaccine Board. He was soon relieved of the Lunatic Asylum, for which a resident officer was appointed. In 1869 Dr. Moore resigned from the post of Colonial Surgeon, being succeeded by Dr. Paterson, and went into private practice, but continued as President of the Medical Board and official visitor with the Lunatic Asylum. He was also associated with the Orphan Home from its commencement, and served as its consulting physician. He was a Governor of St. Peters College, an Honorary Surgeon of the Female Refuge, and a member of the Linnæan Society. He acted as a Judge at various Horticultural and Floricultural Shows. He was highly literate and owned a library considered one of the best in the colony. He had an extensive practice and was very popular among the poor, to whom he always displayed the greatest kindness and consideration.

== Family ==
He married Luduvine Charlotte Jane Dutton (1833 – 14 May 1868) on 3 December 1851; their children included:

- Robert Garret Moore (22 September 1852 – 4 December 1890), solicitor
- William Frederick Moore MB., ChM. (4 Mar 1854 – 3 Aug 1913), medical practitioner in New Zealand
- Arthur Kingston Moore (9 July 1857 – ), sheep farmer in Port Lincoln, married Sophia Charlotte Cameron on 21 December 1878
- Louisa Moore (26 Feb 1859 – 10 May 1940) married Dr. William F. Gardner on 30 March 1880
- Henry Percival Moore (8 Nov 1860 – 7 July 1936), manager of the Strathalbyn Branch of the Bank of Australasia, married Eleanor Formby on 30 November 1885
- Edwin Canton Moore (3 April 1862 – 25 April 1890), solicitor
- Anna Theresa Moore (2 September 1866 – ) married Harry Dove Young (7 February 1867 – 22 June 1944) on 25 August 1904

== His last days ==
He was in failing health the last few years of his life; he consulted physicians in Melbourne and Sydney to no avail. In his last weeks he was attended by Dr. Ellison and Dr. Phillips, and an old friend Dr. Graham of Melbourne. The funeral attracted a large congregation which included the Governor, Sir W. C. F. Robinson, Chief Justice Samuel Way, Sir Henry Ayers, Sir William Milne, G. C. Hawker, E. W. Hawker, J. B. Spence, W. L. Cleland, the Mayor of Adelaide W. Bundey, J. M. Stuart and J. H. Finlayson. He was buried at the North Road cemetery alongside his wife.

== Arms ==
Coat of arms of Robert Waters Moore
Notes Confirmed 7 February 1922 by Sir Nevile Rodwell Wilkinson, Ulster King of Arms. Crest A moor's head Proper issuant out of a crest coronet charged on the neck with a mullet voided Or. Escutcheon Azure on a chief cotised Or a mullet voided Gules between two trefoils slipped Vert. Motto Fortis Cadere Cedere Non Potest
