= Mount Davies Road =

Track in South Australia

Mount Davies Road South Australia
- A map of Mount Davies Road and Kintore Avenue
- Coordinates: 26.152973°S 129.209834°E (Northwest end); 28.537572°S 131.738281°E (Southeast end)

General information
- Type: Track
- Length: 397 km (247 mi)
- Built by: Len Beadell

Major junctions
- Northwest end: Gunbarrel Highway; Pipalyatjara, South Australia
- Southeast end: Anne Beadell Highway; Anne's Corner, South Australia

Location(s)
- Region: Far North

Restrictions
- Permits: required
- Fuel supply: none

Mount Davies Road is a remote unsealed outback track which runs from Mount Davies (Pipalyatjara) in the far north-west corner of South Australia to Anne's Corner on the Anne Beadell Highway 397 kilometres (247 mi) to the south-east. It was built during 1956 and 1957 by the Gunbarrel Road Construction Party (GRCP) surveyed and led by Len Beadell, for the Weapons Research Establishment at Woomera, South Australia.

== Road survey ==
As a result of British atomic tests at Emu Field in 1953, a weather station was needed to the far north-west of the test sites, to determine when suitable weather conditions existed for future tests. Len Beadell was given the task of selecting a team and constructing access roads from the test locality to the future weather station. The weather station was named Giles, after the explorer Ernest Giles who had explored that part of the remote inland.

The access road began at Victory Downs in the Northern Territory and became known as the Gunbarrel Highway. The construction party reached Mount Davies in the Tomkinson Ranges at the north-west corner of South Australia in December 1955.

In June 1956, after the Gunbarrel Highway had reached Giles, and the airstrip was laid out, Beadell returned to Mount Davies to begin a solo reconnaissance towards the south-east to survey a route for another road to link up with Emu Field. There had been recent rains which made the going tough, and early in the journey he suspected that a front axle of his four-wheel drive vehicle was broken due to slow progress in moist sand. He continued on as he had seen a cluster of rocky mountains in the distance, Mount Lindsay, which was useful as a survey trig point. The mountains reminded him of Ayers Rock by the smooth, rounded shape of the formation.

After scaling the highest point, he noticed water in a creek below, which he later explored from the Land Rover. The vehicle sank into soft sand, and it took him until the next day to extricate himself, as only the rear wheels were driving. He decided that the new road would pass by this feature due to the good supply of water.

He pressed on through thick scrub, and was more than halfway to the destination when he noticed that fuel usage was greater than normal because of the moist ground. He began to doubt if there was sufficient fuel left to make it Emu Field. The vehicle was equipped with a high-frequency radio, so he was still able to contact his base, but suddenly the rear axle broke and further progress ceased with 110 kilometres (68 mi) to go.

Beadell used his theodolite at night for astronomical observations, and calculated his exact location the next morning which he was able to pass to base via radio. It was a week before a rescue team arrived. The wrong parts had been brought, so the vehicle was left where it was. It was repaired at a later date, and the survey was able to be completed.

== Road building ==
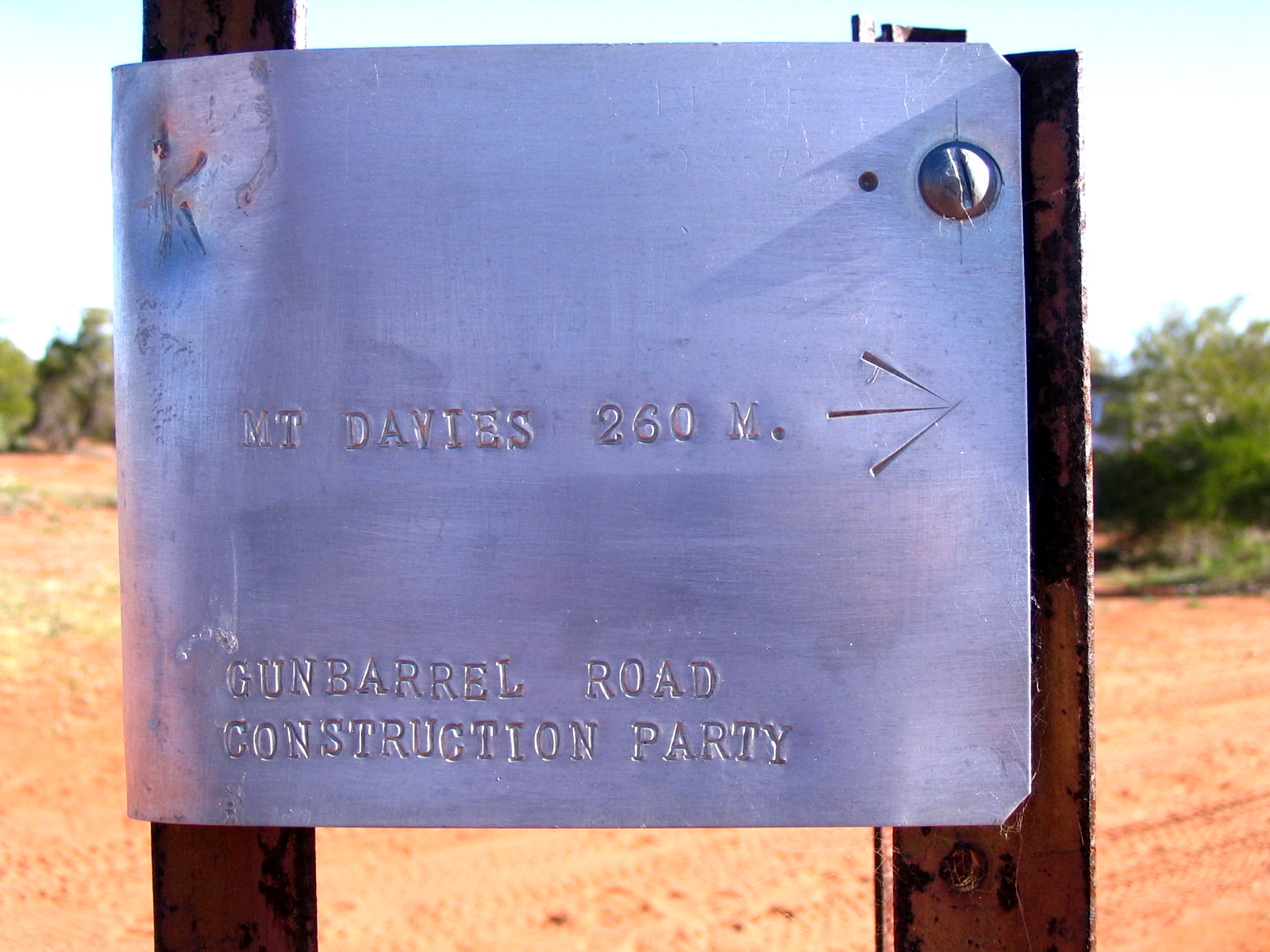
Beadell sign at Annes Corner

Beadell returned to Mount Davies in July 1956 and led the GRCP with a bulldozer and grader back towards Emu Field, to begin construction of the new road. The supply truck and fitter's truck experienced mechanical problems early on, so they had to be towed by the grader until Beadell was able to drive to Giles to pick up vital spares, after they had been delivered by aircraft. Near Mt. Lindsay, the bulldozer became bogged in soft ground, and almost simultaneously the grader was bogged some distance away. It took two days of hard work to extricate both machines.

Sites for a mobile meteorological station were surveyed at Mount Lindsay and Coffin Hill in August. In September, work was halted while British scientists visited Giles, and was not restarted until the following year in June 1957. A point on a previously made road 48 kilometres (30 mi) west of Emu Field was reached in July, with the corner named Anne's Corner, after Beadell's future wife. In 1958, work continued on the Gunbarrel Highway.

== Kintore Avenue ==
Four years after the Mount Davies Road was completed, Beadell and the GRCP built a new road connecting the Gunbarrel Highway to the Mount Davies Road, in order to shorten travelling time from the east. They started just south of the Mann Ranges on 10 May 1961. They proceeded in a southerly direction and intercepted the Mount Davies Road about 50 kilometres (31 mi) south of Mount Lindsay on 6 June, a distance of 153 km (95 mi). It was named Kintore Avenue after Mount Kintore, a feature visible on the eastern side of the new road.

== Present conditions ==
The entire length of the Mount Davies Road lies within the Anangu Pitjantjatjara lands. A note on the reference map states "All roads and tracks in the Anangu Pitjantjatjara Land area are not accessible by the general public."

== See also ==
- Watarru
- Anangu Pitjantjatjara Yankunytjatjara
