= Bill Goss =

Bill Goss may refer to:

- Bill Goss (author), American author
- Bill Goss (singer), member of the boyband The Choirboys

== See also ==
- William Goss (disambiguation)
