= Mount Davies (South Australia) =

Mountain in South Australia

Coordinates: 26°12′48″S 129°15′30″E

Location in South Australia

Mount Davies is a mountain in the Tomkinson Ranges in the north-west corner of South Australia, with an altitude of about 1,039 metres (3,409 ft) above sea level.

The nearest settlement is Pipalyatjara, a small Aboriginal community in the APY lands of South Australia, which was for a while known as Mount Davies.

== History ==
The mount is in the traditional lands of the Pitjantjatjara one of the Anangu peoples of the central desert, who speak the Western Desert language.

The first European the see the mount was W.C. Gosse on 27 August 1873. He named it after Richard Davies Hanson, acting governor from December 1872 to June 1873.

Access to the areas was improved in the 1950s when the Mount Davies Road was constructed to provide access to a remote weather station, as part of the British nuclear testing program.
