= Ellis Bankin =

Australian motorcyclist

Ellis Matthewman Bankin
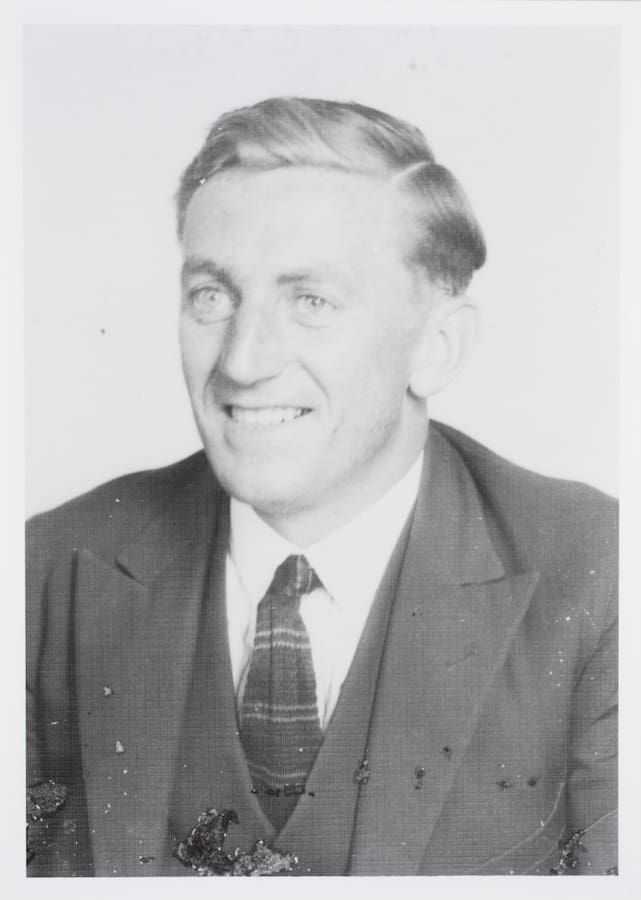
- Born: 1903
- Died: 14 January 1936 (aged 32–33)
- Cause of death: Thirst, exhaustion
- Occupation: School teacher

Ellis Matthewman Bankin (1903–1936) was an Australian teacher who died while motorcycling near Mount Conner, Northern Territory.

Ellis Bankin was born in Greenvale, Victoria in 1903. he joined the Victorian Department of Education when he was 18. Bankin would teach at schools across Australia, however he was also an ardent motorcyclist, making several trips throughout Australia and overseas. He visited the United States of America, travelling by boat as a sea steward, and spent three years there, where he visited 45/48 states. He then visited Canada, before returning to Australia. His next overseas trip was to England where he rode a bicycle around the country. He spent one year in England, travelling between teaching and taking odd jobs.

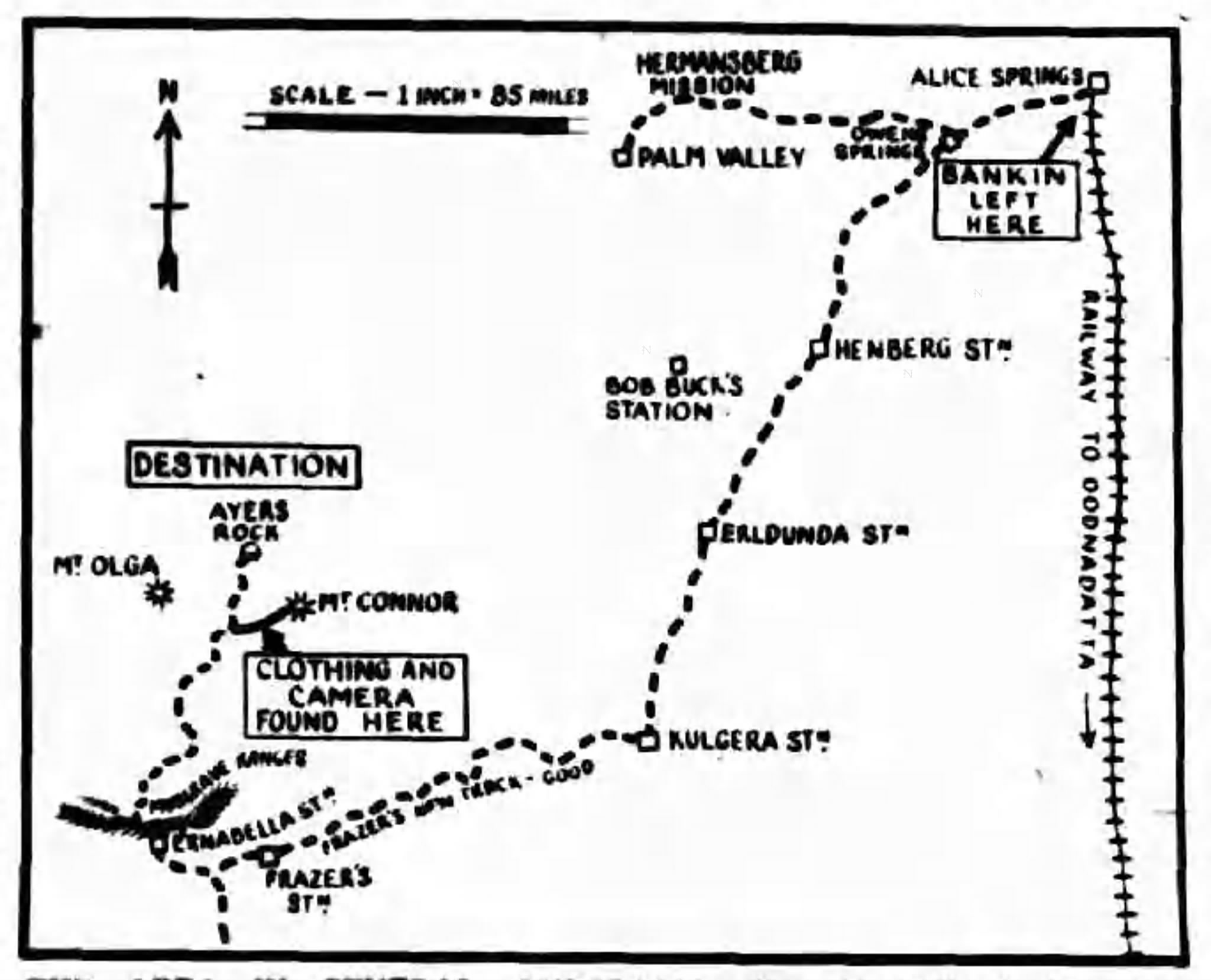
A map illustrating Ellis Bankin's final trip. Published in The Sun News Pictorial.

Back in Australia, in January 1936 Bankin attempted to ride through the Northern Territory on his Triumph motorcycle. He had left Melbourne on 22 December 1935, and on 9 January 1936 set out from Alice Springs for Uluru, via Mount Conner. During the journey he was overcome by thirst and later found dead in the desert, ten miles from Lyndavale Station. Prior to entering the desert, Bankin had been repeatedly warned that his trip was suicidal to attempt without camels. However Bankin ignored them. It's believed that he mistook Mount Conner for Uluru and travelled in the wrong direction before he stopped. His bike had become stuck in the sand and his body was found laying nearby. He was found four miles from a watering hole which is presumed could have saved his life had he known it was there.

He was 32 years old at the time of his death and had been employed by Glenroy state school, where he had worked since 1934. He was due to return to work at the end of January

Bankin was buried where he died. A monument to Bankin was erected in Tarcombe, Victoria in August 1936. A scholarship was founded in his honour in September that year.

Bankin also contributed articles to Walkabout magazine where he described his motorcycle trips across Australia. The first, 'Across Australia by Motor Cycle', was published in August 1935, while the second, 'Innamincka – Impressions of a motor-cycle trip to this lonely station in the north-east of South Australia', was published in February 1936. The first was later republished in The School Magazine with a short biography explaining the tragedy of his death.

His life was the subject of Ellis Matthewman Bankin: Outback motorcyclist who perished: a biography (1997) by Richard N. Duckworth. His research on Bankin is held by the State Library Victoria. Additionally Library & Archives NT holds the Richard Duckworth Collection contianing photographs documenting Duckworth's visits to Bankin's grave, and the Ellis Matthewman Bankin Collection 1903–1936 containing extracts from Bankin's diaries.
