= R. G. Howarth =

Robert Guy Howarth (10 May 1906 — 21 January 1974) was an Australian scholar, literary critic and poet.

== Early life ==
Howarth was born in Tenterfield, New South Wales, on 10 May 1906, the son of Australian-born parents, his father being a school teacher.

He was educated at Fort Street High School, the University of Sydney (BA, 1929), where he won first-class honours, the medal in English and the Wentworth travelling fellowship. He then studied at Oxford University (B.Litt., 1931), where he specialised in seventeenth-century poetry, and edited and published several books between 1931 and 1933.

== Career ==
=== Academia ===
He was appointed lecturer in English at Sydney University in 1933.

In 1948 Howarth was appointed reader in English literature. He was elected a fellow (1952) of the Royal Society of Literature of the United Kingdom, and was a foundation member (1954–55) of the Australian Humanities Research Council, a member (1950–55) of the advisory board of the Commonwealth Literary Fund and president (1947–55) of the Sydney branch of the English Association.

Disappointed at not being appointed to the Challis Chair in English Literature at the University of Sydney in 1955, he accepted the Arderne Chair of English literature at the University of Cape Town. Here he taught J. M. Coetzee, who had a high opinion of him. He initiated a course in creative writing and included South African authors in his courses (which was unusual at the time). He also started the journal A Literary Miscellany, with Jonty Driver. Here he was known as Guy.

Awarded grants by the Commonwealth Literary Fund in 1971 and 1972 to prepare an edition of the letters of Norman Lindsay, Howarth returned to Sydney.

=== Expertise and publications ===
He established a reputation as an expert in Elizabethan tragedy and Restoration comedy. He introduced modernist and contemporary writers, and Australian writers, into the curriculum. In 1939 he persuaded the Australian English Association to publish under his editorship the journal Southerly. Through his role editing Southerly, and as a literary critic for The Sydney Morning Herald, he influenced the development of Australian literature.

He also edited or wrote introductions for works by Hugh McCrae and Joseph Furphy, William Hay's The Escape of the Notorious Sir William Heans (Melbourne, 2nd ed. 1955) and, with Australian poets John Thompson and Kenneth Slessor, The Penguin Book of Australian Verse (London, 1958).

He became an authority on Slessor, and concentrated research into Jacobean dramatist John Webster, with the intention of publishing a book about him, which did not eventuate.

== Later life, family, legacy ==
On 30 December 1973 he suffered a fractured skull when he was struck by a motorcycle in George Street, Sydney, and died on 21 January 1974 in Sydney Hospital.

He had married, aged 19, the 16-year-old Sylvia Marjorie Beryl Smith, a stenographer, in 1925. They had three sons: Philip (born 1925), Anthony (born 1930) and Geoffrey (born 1933); she divorced him in September 1948. On 12 November that year at the registrar general's office, Sydney, he married Lilian Irene Shephard, née Flynn, a clerk and a divorcee. They were divorced in 1964.

Lilian was the beneficiary of his will, and she sold his library and manuscripts as a "collection entire" to the University of Texas at Austin.

The Letters of Norman Lindsay (1979) was completed by Anthony Barker.
