= Mount Conner =

Mountain in Australia

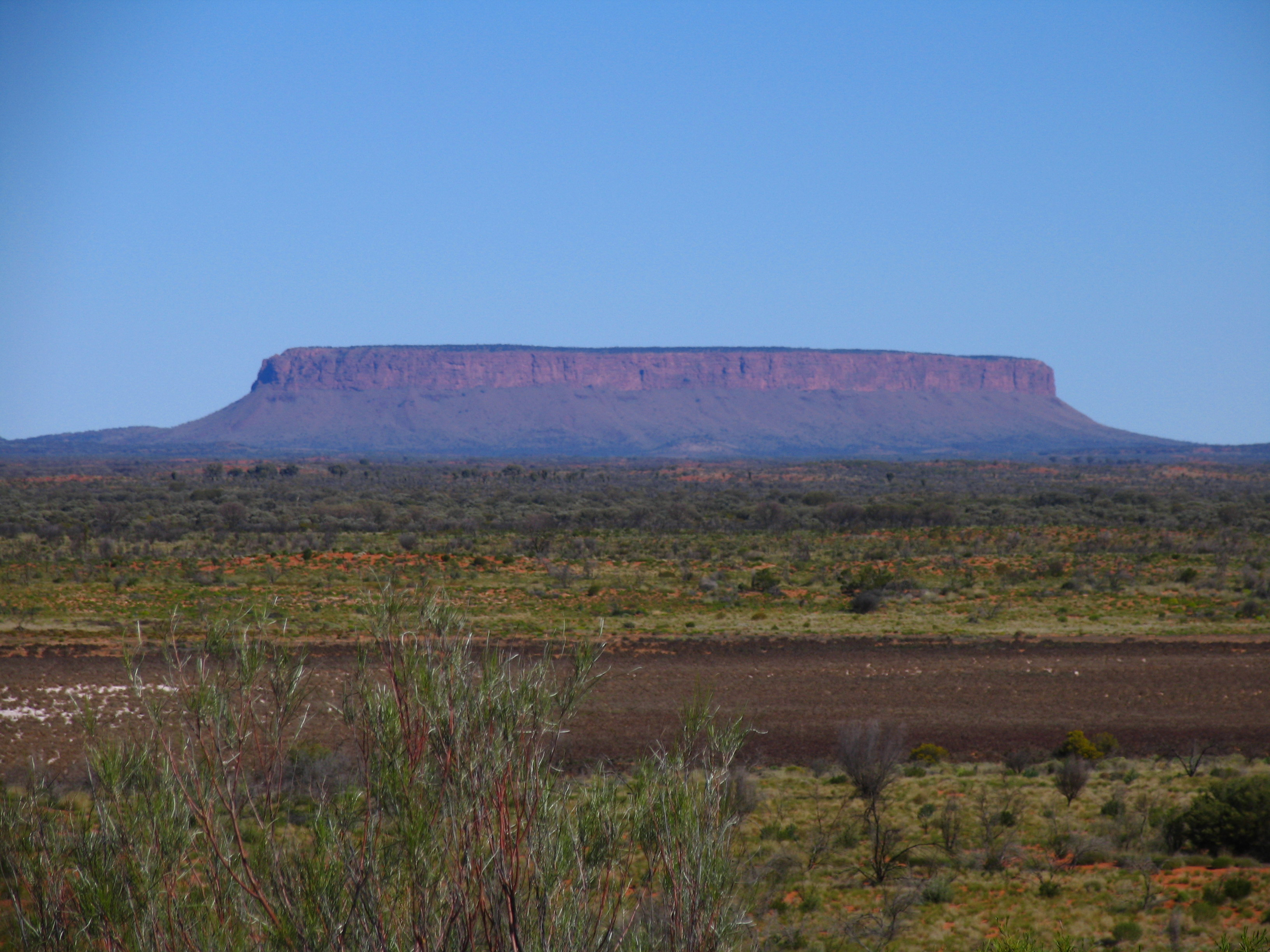
- Mount Conner seen from the road to Uluru / Ayers Rock

Highest point
- Elevation: 859 m (2,818 ft)AHD
- Coordinates: 25°29′34″S 131°53′52″E

Naming
- Etymology: M. L. Conner

Geography
- Location within Northern Territory
- Location: Petermann, Northern Territory, Australia

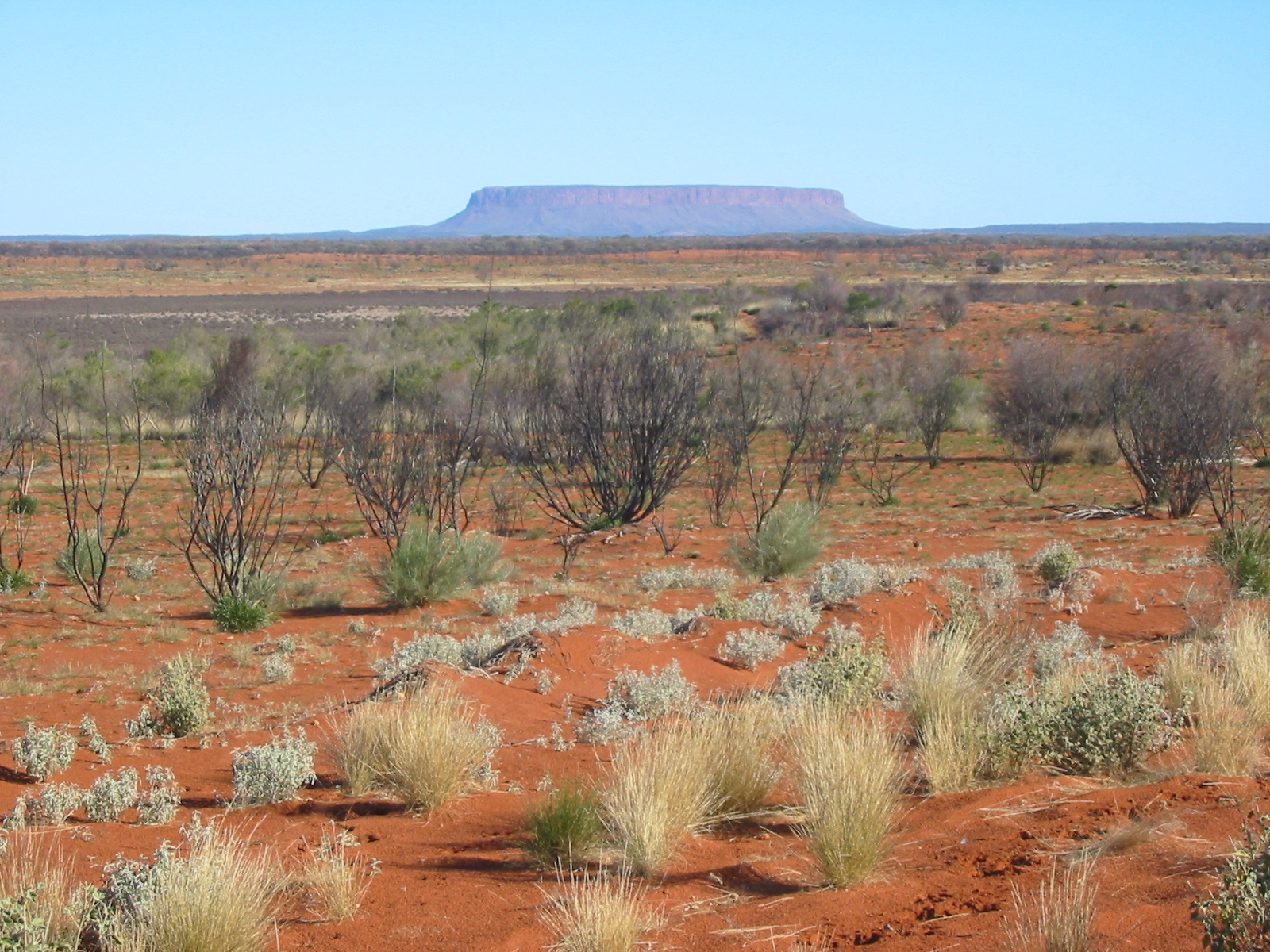
Landscape with Mount Conner

Mount Conner – also known as Artilla (or Atila), or tongue-in-cheek as Fooluru (or Fuluru) – is a mesa located in the southwest corner of the Northern Territory of Australia.

== Location and description ==
Mount Conner is located 75 kilometres (47 mi) southeast of Lake Amadeus, in the locality of Petermann. It lies within the Curtin Springs cattle station in Pitjantjatjara country, close to the site of the Kungkarangkalpa (Seven Sisters) Dreaming.

Its height reaches 859 metres (2,818 ft) above sea level and 300 metres (984 ft) above ground level.

== Names ==
Mount Conner was named after M. L. Conner by explorer William Gosse in 1873. Its Aboriginal name is "Artilla" or "Attila", believed to be associated with the "terrible ice-man" story.

It is also known by locals as "Fool-uru" or "Fuluru", owing to tourists sometimes confusing it with Uluru. Former schoolteacher Ellis Bankin is thought to have mistaken Mount Conner for Uluru when he was travelling to the latter in 1936. He died and was buried near Mount Conner after suffering from exhaustion.

== Geology ==
The sides of Mount Conner are blanketed by scree (talus) and its top is blanketed by colluvium. The base of Mount Conner is surrounded by alluvium.

The summit of Mount Conner, along with the summits of low domes in the Kata Tjuta complex and summit levels of Uluru, is an erosional remnant of a Cretaceous geomorphic surface. It is considered to be a classic example of an inselberg created by erosion of surrounding strata.

== See also ==
- List of mountains of the Northern Territory
