= Colonial Surgeon (South Australia) =

Government office in South Australia to 1912

The Office of Colonial Surgeon was, during the days when South Australia was a British colony, a salaried Government position, whose duties and responsibilities were defined by the Parliament of the day. From 1870 it was de facto attached to the post of Surgeon to the Lunatic Asylum / Mental Hospital, with no additional salary. The title persisted for some years after Federation and Statehood and dropped in 1912.

== Incumbents ==
- – August 1839 Thomas Young Cotter (– 9 January 1882) suspended for neglect of duty. Cotter was a son of Sir James Lawrence Cotter.
- August 1839 – March 1857 James George Nash (c. 1805 – 12 November 1880)
- March 1857 – March 1858 William Gosse (c. 1813 – 20 July 1883) He had been acting in the position from 1856. He resigned to take up partnership with Dr Anton Bayer (died 1866).
- March 1858 – December 1869 Robert Waters Moore ( – 8 December 1884) He lost his position when the post of Colonial Surgeon was axed.
- January 1870 – July 1896 Andrew Stewart Paterson Appointed surgeon to the Adelaide Lunatic Asylum, he was given the additional title and responsibilities of Colonial Surgeon without increase in salary, retired after taking extended leave.
- July 1896 – November 1912 William Lennox Cleland (18 January 1847 – 5 November 1918) He had been acting in the position six months earlier, on top of his duties as surgeon to the Parkside Lunatic Asylum, when Paterson went to Europe on leave.

The Office of Colonial Surgeon was abolished in November 1912 and much of the duties and responsibilities transferred to the Inspector-General.

== Lists of duties etc. ==
- 1858
