= Charles Fenn =

Australian politician

Charles Fenn (c. 1816 – 17 February 1873) was a solicitor and member of the first Legislative Council in the Colony of South Australia.

Fenn arrived in South Australia 15 April 1838 aboard the Lord Goderich from London.

He worked as solicitor in Adelaide from around 1849, and was in partnership with Henry Johnson as "Johnson and Fenn" from 1849 to 1850. Shortly after the partnership was dissolved, Johnson was implicated in fraudulent conversion of trust funds.

He was the member for East Torrens in the Legislative Council following the resignation of George Waterhouse and served from June 1854 to August 1855. He was an opponent of R. R. Torrens's Real Property Act (which threatened a source of income for lawyers).

He died in Adelaide following a fall.

== Family ==
He married Sarah Isabella Bradshaw (c. 1823 – 23 May 1875), daughter of Robert Fletcher Bradshaw, on 3 March 1842

- Charles Fletcher Fenn (3 October 1843 – 3 November 1907) married Eva Fenn, née Simpson, (c. 1856 – 19 May 1940), previously married to his brother James, see below. on 29 December 1891. He was a solicitor, of the firm Fenn & Hardy.
- Emily Sarah Fenn (27 January 1845 – c. 11 August 1896) married David Grant Gosse (c. 1841 – 1 July 1880), eldest son of William Gosse on 8 April 1869.
- Frances Ann "Fanny" Fenn (3 April 1848 – after 1935) married Salvator Rosa Wakefield (c. 1836 – 21 September 1898) of Glenelg on 20 September 1877. S. R. Wakefield was a son of Felix Wakefield and nephew of Edward Gibbon Wakefield. He previously married Susannah Grace Cox (c. 1848 – 9 May 1876), and was an early employee of Elder, Smith and Co.
- Martha Alice Fenn (11 October 1849 – 3 February 1910) married Gerald Jay on 14 January 1874
- Thomas George Fenn (10 January 1852 – 4 January 1902) married Amelia Maud Jackson (c. 1854 – 2 October 1925) on 24 April 1888
- William Edward Fenn (6 July 1854 – 21 May 1891) died after falling down stairs.
- James Bradshaw Fenn (25 September 1856 – 18 January 1890) married Ann Jackson ( – 15 June 1886) on 21 May 1880; several sons died young. He married again, to Eva Simpson (c. 1856 – 19 May 1940) on 21 April 1887. Widowed, she married again, to his brother Charles Fletcher Fenn, see above.
- Frederick Arthur (5 January 1858 – 25 June 1897)

His last residence was in Childers Street, North Adelaide.
