= Mountifort Conner =

Australian politician

Mountifort Longfield Conner (18 September 1824 – c. 12 November 1880), occasionally referred to as M. Longfield Conner, was an auctioneer, commission agent and politician in the British colony of South Australia. He was well known as a sporting gentleman in South Australia and sporting journalist in Victoria and New South Wales.

== History ==
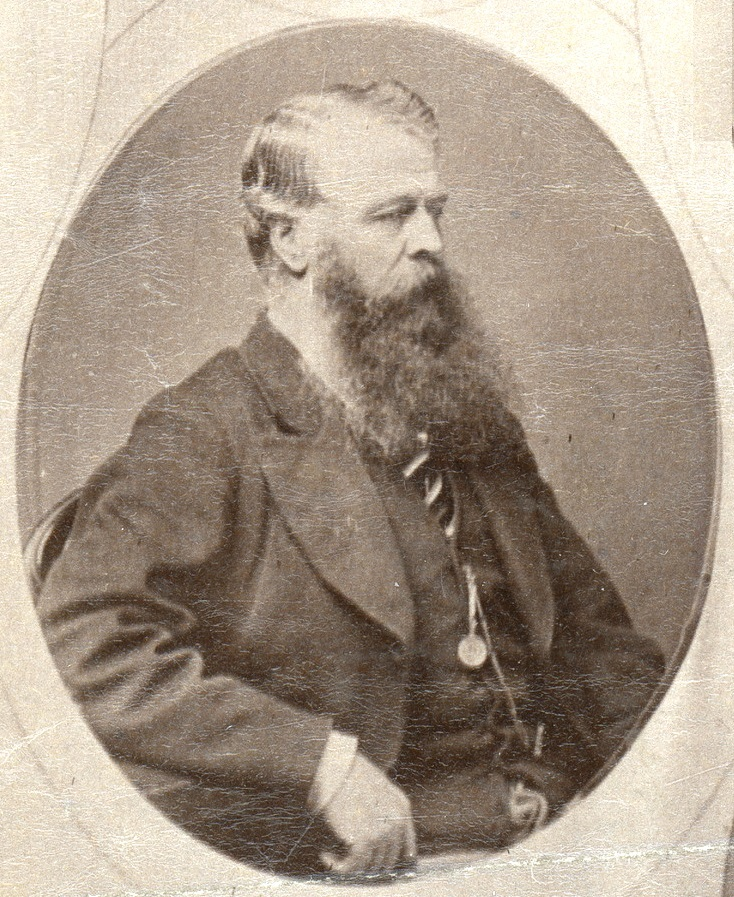
Mountifort Longfield Conner

He was the youngest son of Daniel Conner (1798–1880) and his wife Elizabeth, née Longfield (daughter of Rev. Mountifort Longfield), of Ballineen, County Cork, Ireland.

He came to public notice when he offered a directorship on the South Eastern Railway Company to John Riddoch MHA, which Riddoch properly rejected.

He was involved as a judge and administrator in various forms of equestrian sport: hunting, steeplechasing and flat racing. He was a founder of the oldest coursing club in Australia, hunting wallabies in Naracoorte, where he lived until around 1871.

He was a candidate for the South Australian House of Assembly seat of Victoria in 1870, but was defeated, the successful candidates being Park Laurie and William Paltridge. He was elected to the seat of Light from December 1871 to September 1873, when he resigned to take a post of Warden of the Northern Territory goldfields, (which he performed to the evident satisfaction of the miners, but resigned a year later) and for Albert from February 1875 to June 1875, when he again resigned due to ill-health, having contracted an "ague" (probably malaria) in the Territory.

He moved to Melbourne, where, as "The Baron", he wrote a sporting column for The Leader newspaper. He shifted to Sydney, where he wrote a column for the Daily Telegraph.

He died in Sydney Infirmary around 12 November 1880.

== Recognition ==
Mount Conner in the Northern Territory was named after him by explorer William Gosse in 1873.
