= William Goss =

William Goss may refer to:

- William Henry Goss, English potter
- William Freeman Myrick Goss, American mechanical engineer and inventor
- Roland Drew, né William Goss, actor

== See also ==
- Bill Goss (disambiguation)
- William Gosse (disambiguation)
