= Mount Kintore =

Mountain in South Australia

Coordinates: 26°33′44″S 130°28′56″E

Location in South Australia

Mount Kintore (dual-named as "Ilpinga/Mount Kintore") is an inselberg in the Australian state of South Australia located in the Anangu Pitjantjatjara Yankunytjatjara lands in the state's northwest. It is about 1,066 metres (3,497 ft) above sea level.

It is located about halfway between the remote communities of Amaṯa and Watarru. The mountain is made up mostly of metamorphic beds of gneisses and quartzite, which are split with diorite dykes. The beds have been thrown into a series of simple folds. These can be clearly seen on the northern face of the mountain. The rock has been weathered into ridges, and heavy erosion can be seen along the folds. At the western end of the mountain, the gneiss is replaced by granite.

Mount Kintore is part of the traditional country of the Pitjantjatjara people. An important rock hole is located about 12 km (7.5 mi) to the west, called Kunamata.

The name "Mount Kintore" was given to the mountain in the honour of Algernon Keith-Falconer, 9th Earl of Kintore, who was the Governor of South Australia from 1889 to 1895. The name "Ilpinga " was recorded during a field trip organised by an unspecified state government agency in May 1989. The mountain was officially given the dual names of "Ilpinga / Mount Kintore" by the Government of South Australia on 28 July 1994.
