= W. L. Cleland =

Australian physician (1847–1918)

William Lennox Cleland (18 January 1847 – 5 November 1918) was a medical doctor in South Australia, for 40 years in charge of Parkside Lunatic Asylum.

== History ==
Cleland was born in Hong Kong, the eldest son of missionary John Fullerton Cleland ( – 29 November 1901) who migrated to South Australia aboard Gloucester, arriving in Adelaide in August 1852. He was educated in Adelaide, and afterwards studied in Switzerland, England, and Edinburgh, then returned to found a lucrative practice in Adelaide. He was appointed Resident Medical Officer at the Parkside Lunatic Asylum in December 1878, and Assistant Colonial Surgeon (to A. S. Paterson) in 1879. When Paterson went on extended leave in 1896 he was appointed Acting Colonial Surgeon, and the position made permanent six months later. Dr. M. H. Downey became his assistant in 1905, and as Lt.-Col. Downey served overseas from November 1916, awarded DSO, returned to Australia 1919. He died after a short illness and his remains were buried at the Walkerville cemetery.

== Family ==
William Lennox Cleland (18 January 1847 – 5 November 1918) married Matilda Lauder "Mattie" Burton (1848 – 1928) on 21 June 1877. She was a daughter of John Hill Burton, Historiographer Royal of Scotland. They had two sons:

- Sir John Burton Cleland MB ChM (22 June 1878 – 11 August 1971) married Dora Isabel Paton (1880–1955) on 25 April 1908. A noted naturalist, the Cleland Wildlife Park (now within the Cleland National Park) was named for him in 1963.

- Dr Margaret Burton Cleland MRCS FRACP (1909–2004) married Dr John Patrick Horan (1907–1993) MD FRCP FRACP;
- Dr William Paton 'Bill' Cleland MB FRCP FRCS (1912–2005) married Norah Goodhart (1919–1994)
- Joan Burton Cleland (c. 1915–2000) married Erskine Norman Paton (1922–1985) became an ornithologist;
- Elizabeth Robson Cleland (16 October 1910 – 31 January 2005) married (Alfred) Moxon Simpson CBE (17 November 1910 – 11 November 2001) on 3 August 1938. Moxon was a son of Alfred Allen Simpson. Elizabeth Simpson was author of

The Hahndorf Walkers Beaumont Press, Adelaide 1983 ISBN 0-9592458-0-4
The Clelands of Beaumont Beaumont Press, Adelaide 1986 ISBN 0-9592458-1-2
Beaumont House: The land and its people Beaumont Press, Adelaide 1993 ISBN 0-9592458-2-0

- Barbara Burton Cleland (1913–?), a mathematics graduate, married Prof Andrew John La Nauze (1911–1990)

- William Lauder Cleland BSc (19 July 1882 – 6 October 1946) was a mining engineer in Western Australia and served with the Royal Engineers in the Great War. He married Amelia Adelaide Louise "Millie" Beasley (1882 – 15 April 1914) on 5 February 1908. He married again, to Marjorie Harbron ( – 1975) in 1919

- William Lauder "Will" Cleland (1920 – ) married Naomi Hamilton Stephenson (30 May 1919 - 12 August 2002) on 27 May 1943. He served with RAAF during WWII.
- John Lennox Cleland (9 January 1922 – 2 September 1948) born Newcastle NSW
- James Lindsay Cleland (30 June 1928 – 15 August 2017) married Sylvia c. 1957

== See also ==
- Tietkens expedition of 1889
