= Bill Goss (author) =

Bill Goss (born April 23, 1955) of billgoss.com is an American author, exclusive life fulfillment coach, keynote speaker, and consultant. He is a former U.S. Navy pilot with an MBA. Bill Goss is the author of The Luckiest Unlucky Man Alive: A Wild Ride Overcoming Life's Greatest Challenges—and How You Can Too! He is also the author of There's a Flying Squirrel in My Coffee: Overcoming Cancer with the Help of My Pet published by Atria Books/Simon and Schuster in 2002.
