= William Hay (author) =

Australian author and essayist

William Gosse Hay (17 November 1875, Adelaide – 21 March 1945, Victor Harbor) was an Australian author and essayist.

== History ==
W. G. Hay was born at "Linden" in the eastern suburbs of Adelaide, the second son of Alexander Hay a wealthy merchant, pastoralist and politician, and his second wife Agnes Grant Hay, née Gosse.

He was educated by a private tutor on his parents' cattle station, then at Melbourne Grammar School, subsequently at Trinity College, Cambridge, where he studied law.

William Gosse Hay and Mary Violet Williams were married on 26 October 1901 at the chapel of St. Peter's College, where her late father, Rev. Francis Williams, had been head master. They lived until 1924 at Beaumont then moved to Victor Harbor.

Hay's mother and sister were lost at sea aboard the SS Waratah in July 1909. In 1911, as administrator of the estate of his brother Alexander Gosse Hay (1874–1901), he was involved in legal argument related to the insurance paid out on the destruction by fire of his parents' Victor Harbor home "Mt. Breckan", to which he had an option to purchase. He suffered a breakdown and that same year he and his wife visited Tasmania, where he gathered historic material for his writing.

He died at Victor Harbor after collapsing during an attempt to save his home from a bushfire.

== Family ==
William had a brother and two sisters and eight half-brothers and sisters, and many notable relatives including:

- brother-in-law William Christie Gosse, who, by virtue of W.G. Hay's father marrying W.C. Gosse's sister, was also his uncle
- nephew Sir James Hay Gosse
- grand-nephew George Gosse

William Gosse Hay married Mary Violet Williams ( – 31 May 1949) on 26 October 1901. They lived at "Tower House" on Beaumont Common, later moving to "Nangawooka" near Victor Harbor in 1924. They also built a seaside place at Seacliff. They had three sons:

- Alick
- William
- Andrew Gosse Hay

== Publications ==
- Stifled laughter : a melodrama / William Gosse Hay. London : John MacQueen, 1901 was published with financial assistance of his mother. Later works (all after the first published as "William Hay") were all historical novels set in convict-era Tasmania; all were published in London and were soon out of print:
- Captain Quadring (1911)
- Herridge of Reality Swamp (1905)
- The escape of the notorious Sir William Heans (and the mystery of Mr. Daunt) a romance of Tasmania by William Hay, London : Allen & Unwin 1918. NLA catalogue (Also The escape of the notorious Sir William Heans (and the mystery of Mr. Daunt): a romance of Tasmania (Rev. ed. of first Australian ed.), Melbourne University Press, 1955, "Includes Introduction by R.G. Howarth and Historical background by E.M. Miller.")
- Strabane of the Mulberry Hills : the story of a Tasmanian lake in 1841 / by William Hay. London : George Allen & Unwin, 1929. NLA catalogue
- The Mystery of Alfred Doubt (1935)

== Critical reception ==
The Australian novelist Christina Stead recommended Hay's 1918 novel and noted that Patrick White also admired it:

I have just finished a truly remarkable novel...: The Escape of the Notorious Sir William Heans (and the Mystery of Mr. Daunt)... by author William Hay..., writing about the penal settlement days in Tasmania (one of our worst convict settlements, that of Port Arthur). Given to me by friend-novelist Patrick White: he so greatly admires it that he "keeps buying it and giving it away." This magnificent writer is a most serious deepdyed scholar, student of the epoch and his work is a sort of epic, an Inferno, not the usual horror-story of beatings and killings in prison... an ascent from Avernus. (...) One of his wonders is his extraordinary use of the human face as a stage for conflicting emotions — often all at once!

== Tributes ==
The 3rd issue of 1946 of the Australian literary magazine "Southerly" was devoted to the works of W. G. Hay.
