= Uluru =

Sandstone monolith in the Northern Territory, Australia

- Ayers Rock
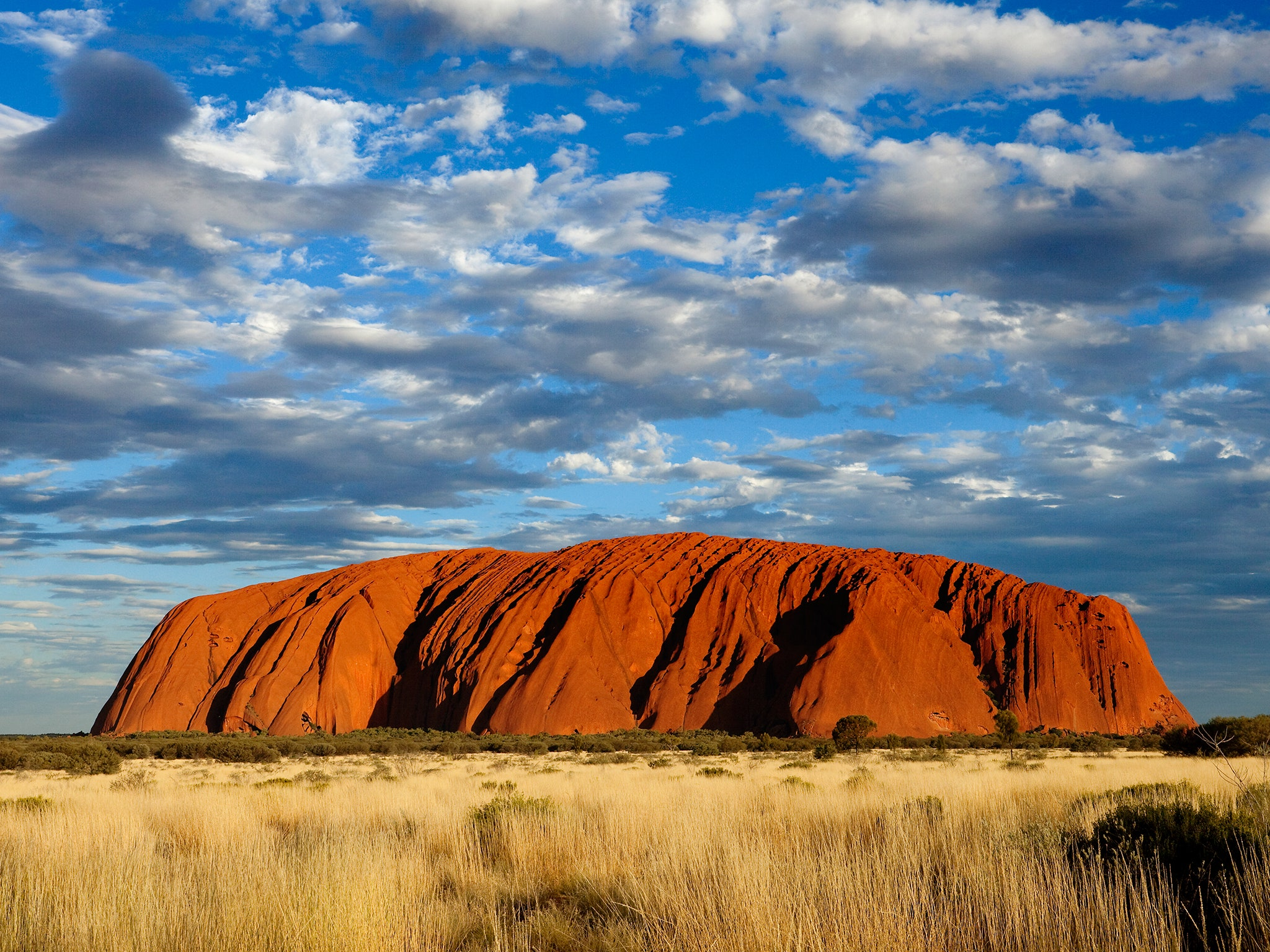

Highest point
- Elevation: 863 m (2,831 ft)
- Prominence: 348 m (1,142 ft)
- Coordinates: 25°20′42″S 131°02′10″E

Naming
- Native name: Uluṟu (Pitjantjatjara)

Geography
- Location within Northern Territory Location within Australia
- Location: Northern Territory, Australia

Geology
- Rock age: 550–530 Ma
- Mountain type: Inselberg
- Rock type: Arkose

UNESCO World Heritage Site
- Official name: Uluṟu-Kata Tjuṯa National Park
- Criteria: v, vi, vii, ix
- Reference: 447
- Inscription: 1987 (11th Session)

Uluru (/ˌuːləˈruː/; Pitjantjatjara: Uluṟu [ˈʊlʊɻʊ]), also known as Ayers Rock (/ˈɛərz/ AIRS) and officially gazetted as Uluru / Ayers Rock, is a large sandstone monolith. It crops out near the centre of Australia in the southern part of the Northern Territory, 335 km (208 mi) south-west of Alice Springs.

Uluru is sacred to the Pitjantjatjara, the Aboriginal people of the area, one of the groups collectively known as the Aṉangu. The area around the formation is home to an abundance of springs, waterholes, rock caves and ancient paintings. Uluru is listed as a UNESCO World Heritage Site. Uluru and Kata Tjuta (also known as the Olgas) are the two major features of the Uluṟu-Kata Tjuṯa National Park.

Uluru is one of Australia's most recognisable natural landmarks and has been a popular destination for tourists since the late 1930s. It is also one of the most important indigenous sites in Australia.

== Name ==
The local Aṉangu, the Pitjantjatjara people, call the landmark Uluṟu (Pitjantjatjara: [ʊlʊɻʊ]). This word is a proper noun, with no further particular meaning in the Pitjantjatjara dialect, although it is used as a local family name by the senior traditional owners of Uluru.

On 19 July 1873, the surveyor William Gosse sighted the landmark and named it Ayers Rock in honour of the then Chief Secretary of South Australia, Sir Henry Ayers.

In 1993, a dual naming policy was adopted that allowed official names that consist of both the traditional Aboriginal name (in the Pitjantjatjara, Yankunytjatjara and other local languages) and the English name. On 15 December 1993, it was renamed "Ayers Rock / Uluru" and became the first official dual-named feature in the Northern Territory. The order of the dual names was officially reversed to "Uluru / Ayers Rock" on 6 November 2002 following a request from the Regional Tourism Association in Alice Springs.

== Description ==
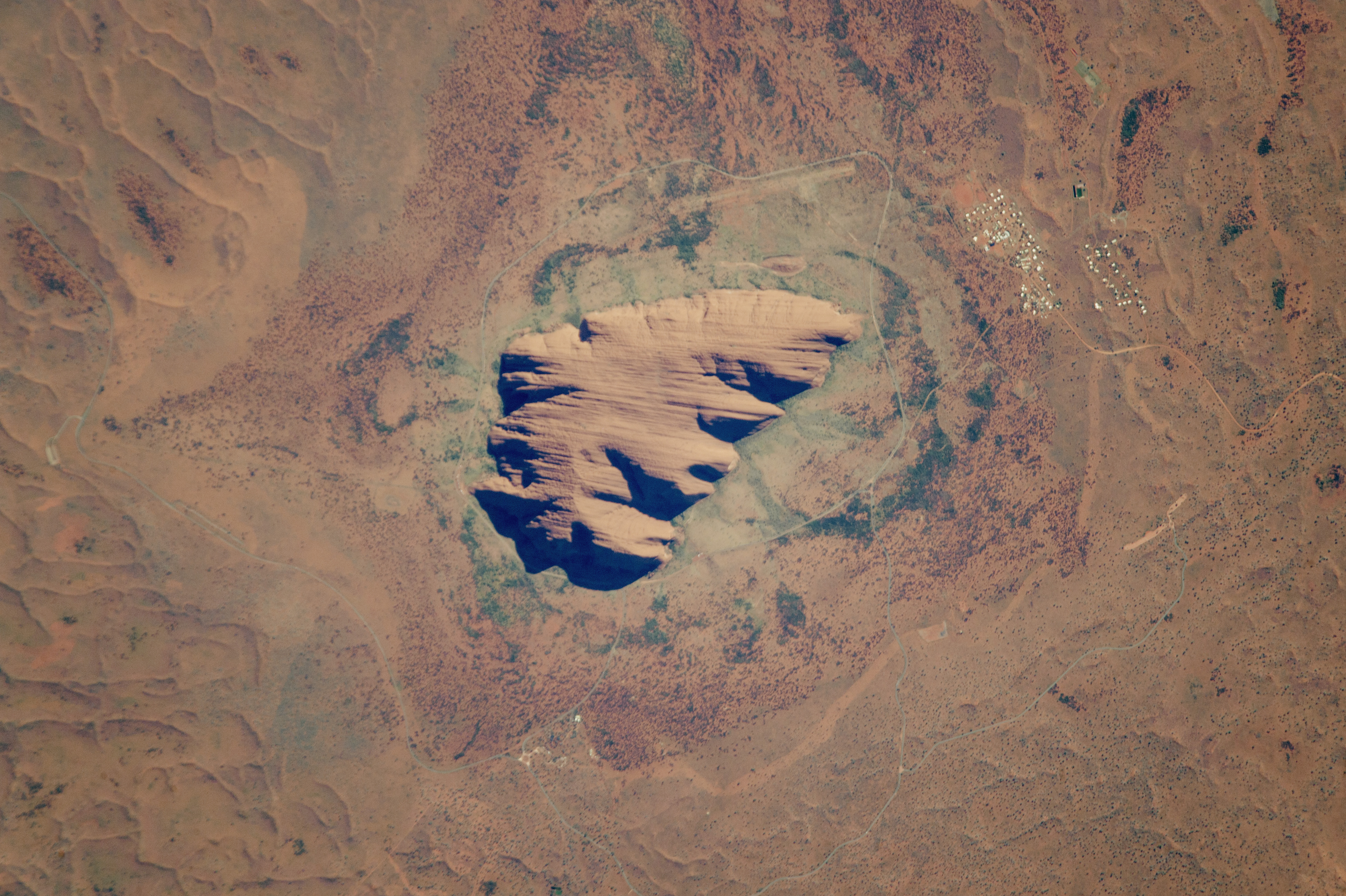
View of Uluru from the ISS

The sandstone formation stands 348 m (1,142 ft) high, rising 863 m (2,831 ft) above sea level with most of its bulk lying underground, and has a total perimeter of 9.4 km (5.8 mi). Uluru is notable for appearing to change colour at different times of the day and year, most notably when it glows red at dawn and sunset. The reddish colour in the rock derives from iron oxide in the sandstone.

Kata Tjuta, also called Mount Olga or the Olgas, lies 25 km (16 mi) west of Uluru. Special viewing areas with road access and parking have been constructed to give tourists the best views of both sites at dawn and dusk.

Both Uluru and the nearby Kata Tjuta formation have great cultural significance for the local Aṉangu people, the traditional inhabitants of the area, who lead walking tours to inform visitors about the bush, food, local flora and fauna, and the Aboriginal Dreamtime stories of the area.

== History ==
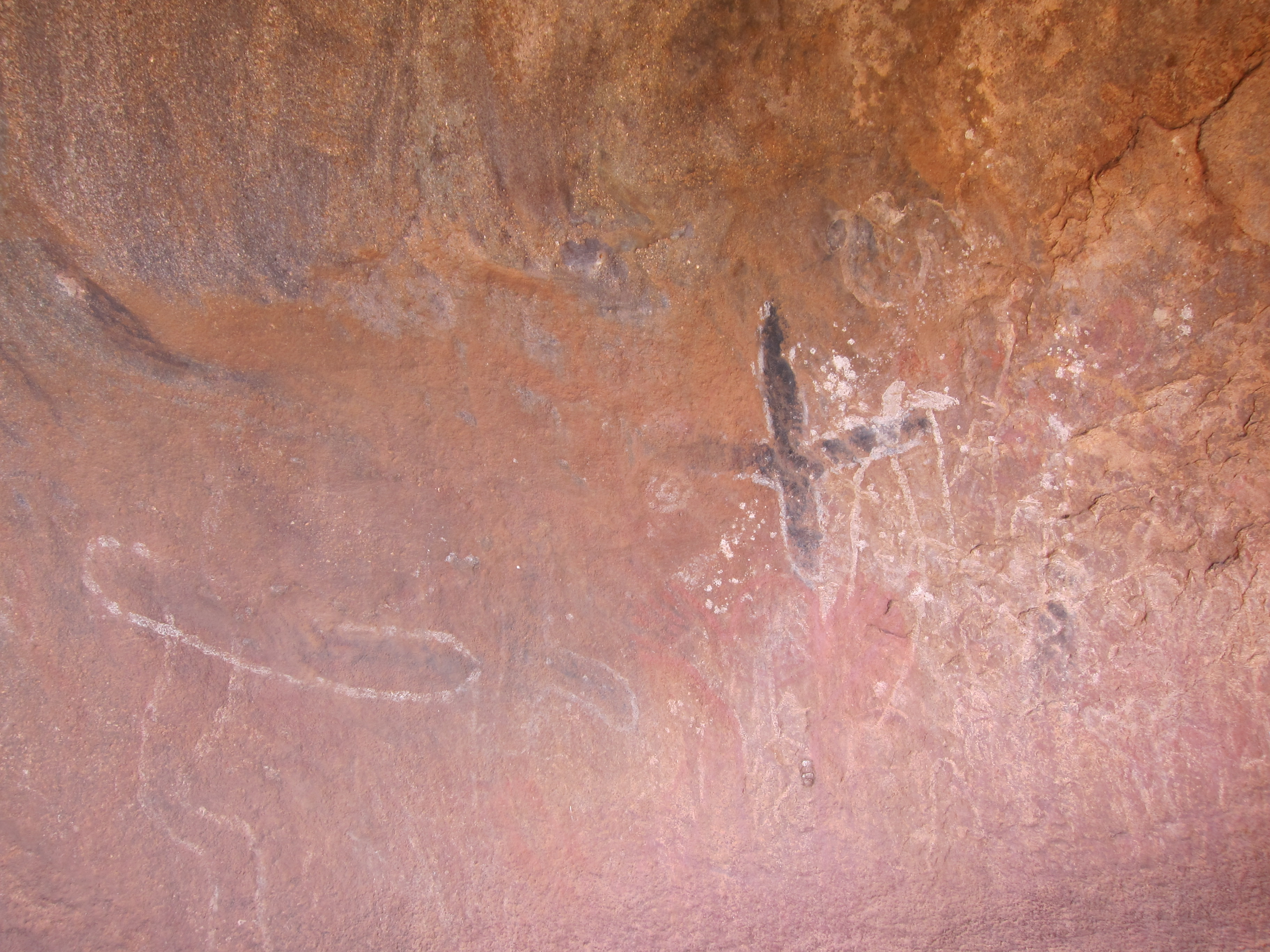
Petroglyphs on Uluru

=== Early settlement ===
Archaeological findings to the east and west indicate that humans settled in the area more than 10,000 years ago.

=== Arrival of Europeans (1870s) ===
Europeans arrived in the Australian Western Desert in the 1870s. Uluru and Kata Tjuta were first mapped by Europeans in 1872 during the expeditionary period, which was made possible by the construction of the Australian Overland Telegraph Line. In separate expeditions, Ernest Giles and William Gosse were the first European explorers to this area. While exploring the area in 1872, Giles sighted Kata Tjuta from a location near Kings Canyon and called it Mount Olga, while the following year Gosse observed Uluru and named it Ayers' Rock, in honour of the Chief Secretary of South Australia, Sir Henry Ayers.

Further explorations followed with the aim of establishing the possibilities of the area for pastoralism. In the late 19th century, pastoralists attempted to establish themselves in areas adjoining the Southwestern/Petermann Reserve and interaction between Aṉangu and white people became more frequent and more violent. Due to the effects of grazing and drought, bush food stores became depleted. Competition for these resources created conflict between the two groups, resulting in more frequent police patrols. Later, during the depression in the 1930s, Aṉangu became involved in dingo scalping with 'doggers' who introduced the Aṉangu to European foods and ways.

=== Aboriginal reserve (1920) ===
Between 1918 and 1921, large adjoining areas of South Australia, Western Australia and the Northern Territory were declared as Aboriginal reserves, government-run settlements where the Aboriginal people were forced to live. In 1920, part of Uluṟu–Kata Tjuṯa National Park was declared an Aboriginal Reserve (commonly known as the South-Western or Petermann Reserve) by the Australian government under the Aboriginals Ordinance 1918.

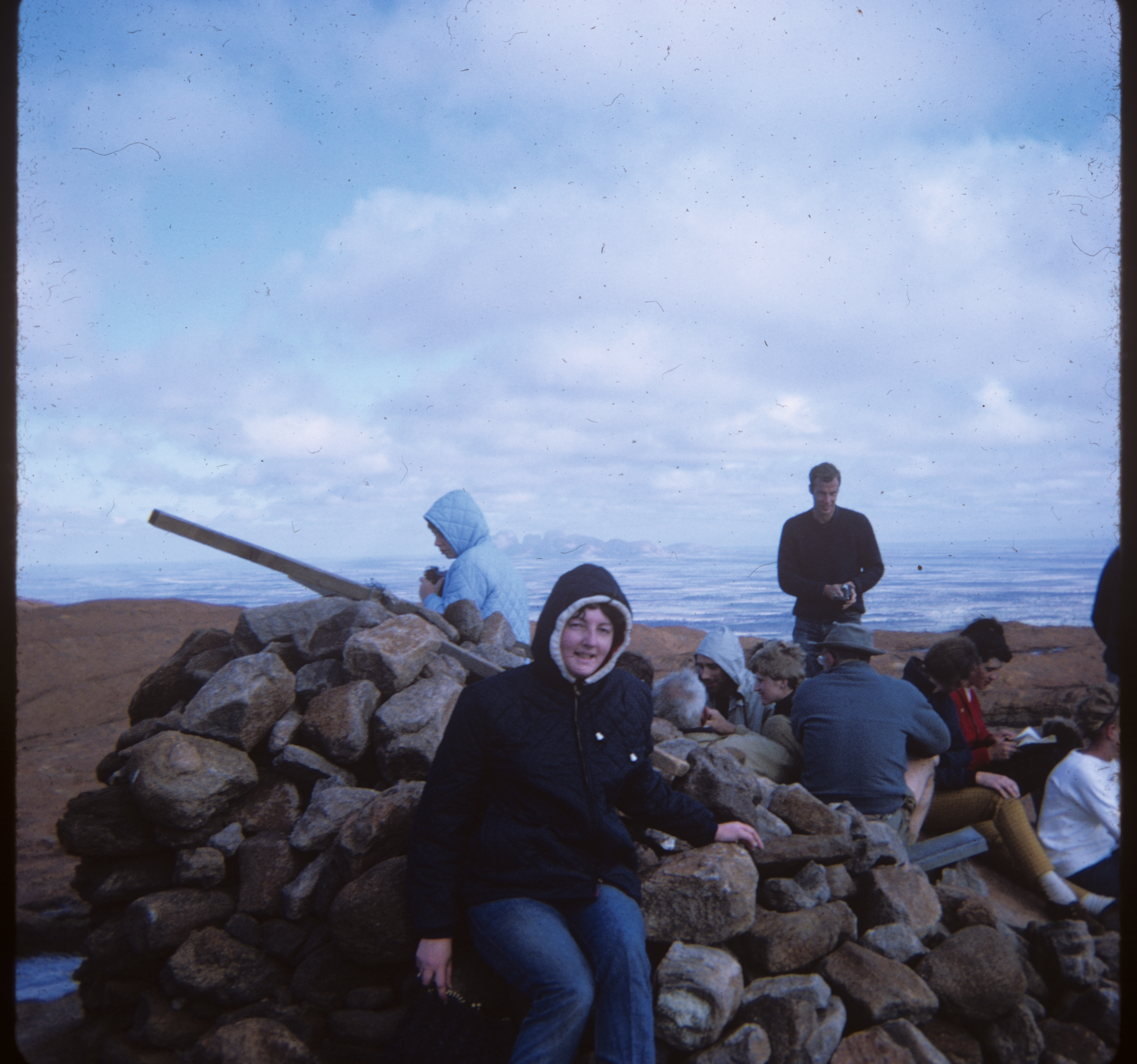
A tourist at the top of Uluru in 1969

=== Tourism (1936–1960s) ===
The first tourists arrived in the Uluru area in 1936. Permanent European settlement of the area began in the 1940s under Aboriginal welfare policy and to promote tourism at Uluru. This increased tourism prompted the formation of the first vehicular tracks in 1948 and tour bus services began early in the 1950s. In 1958, the area that would become the Uluṟu-Kata Tjuṯa National Park was excised from the Petermann Reserve; it was placed under the management of the Northern Territory Reserves Board and named the Ayers Rock–Mount Olga National Park. The first ranger was Bill Harney, a well-recognised central Australian figure. By 1959, the first motel leases had been granted and Eddie Connellan had constructed an airstrip close to the northern side of Uluru. Following a 1963 suggestion from the Northern Territory Reserves Board, a chain was laid to assist tourists in climbing the landmark. The chain was removed in 2019.

=== Aboriginal ownership since 1985 ===
On 26 October 1985, the Australian government returned ownership of Uluru to the local Pitjantjatjara people, with a condition that the Aṉangu would lease it back to the National Parks and Wildlife agency for 99 years and that it would be jointly managed. An agreement originally made between the community and Prime Minister Bob Hawke that the climb to the top by tourists would be stopped was later broken.

The Aboriginal community of Mutitjulu, with a population of approximately 300, is located near the eastern end of Uluru. From Uluru it is 17 km (11 mi) by road to the tourist town of Yulara, population 3,000, which is situated just outside the national park.

On 8 October 2009, the Talinguru Nyakuntjaku viewing area opened to public visitation. The A$21 million project about 3 km (1.9 mi) on the east side of Uluru involved design and construction supervision by the Aṉangu traditional owners of 11 km (6.8 mi) of roads and 1.6 km (1 mi) of walking trails.

== Tourism ==
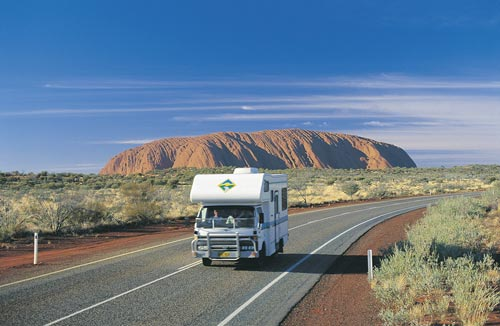
Driving on the A4 Lasseter Highway from Uluṟu-Kata Tjuṯa National Park, April 2007

The development of tourism infrastructure adjacent to the base of Uluru that began in the 1950s soon produced adverse environmental impacts. It was decided in the early 1970s to remove all accommodation-related tourist facilities and re-establish them outside the park. In 1975, a reservation of 104 km^{2} (40 sq mi) of land beyond the park's northern boundary, 15 km (9 mi) from Uluru, was approved for the development of a tourist facility and an associated airport, to be known as Yulara.

In 1983, the Ayers Rock Campground opened, followed by the Four Seasons Hotel (later renamed Voyages Desert Gardens Hotel) and the Sheraton Hotel (Voyages Sails in the Desert) in 1984. The town square, bank and primary school were also established. After the Commonwealth Government handed the national park back to its traditional owners in 1985, management of the park was transferred from the Northern Territory Government to the Australian National Parks and Wildlife Service the following year. In July 1992, Yulara Development Company was dissolved and the Ayers Rock Resort Company was established, after which all hotels came under the same management.

Since the park was listed as a World Heritage Site, annual visitor numbers rose to over 400,000 visitors by 2000. Increased tourism provides regional and national economic benefits. It also presents an ongoing challenge to balance conservation of cultural values and visitor needs.

=== Climbing ===
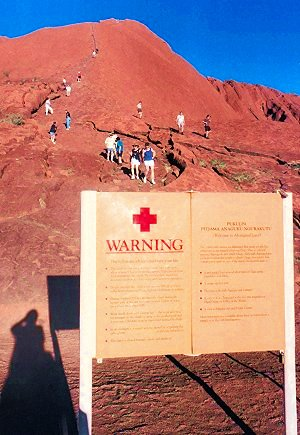
Climbers and a warning sign in 2005

The local Aṉangu do not climb Uluru because of its great spiritual significance. They have in the past requested that visitors not climb the rock, partly due to the path crossing a sacred traditional Dreamtime track, and also due to a sense of responsibility for the safety of visitors. Until October 2019, the visitors' guide said "the climb is not prohibited, but we prefer that, as a guest on Aṉangu land, you will choose to respect our law and culture by not climbing".

On 11 December 1983, the Prime Minister of Australia, Bob Hawke, promised to hand back the land title to the Aṉangu traditional custodians and caretakers and agreed to the community's 10-point plan which included forbidding the climbing of Uluru. The government set access to climb Uluru and a 99-year lease, instead of the previously agreed upon 50-year lease, as conditions before the title was officially given back to the Aṉangu on 26 October 1985.

A chain handhold, added to the rock in 1964 and extended in 1976, made the hour-long climb easier, but it remained a steep, 800 m (0.5 mi) hike to the top, where it can be quite windy. It was recommended that individuals drink plenty of water while climbing, and that those who were unfit, or who suffered from vertigo or medical conditions restricting exercise, did not attempt it. Climbing Uluru was generally closed to the public when high winds were present at the top. As of July 2018, 37 deaths related to recreational climbing have been recorded.

According to a 2010 publication, just over one-third of all visitors to the park climbed Uluru; a high percentage of these were children. About one-sixth of visitors made the climb between 2011 and 2015.

The traditional owners of Uluṟu-Kata Tjuṯa National Park (Nguraritja) and the Federal Government's Director of National Parks share decision-making on the management of Uluṟu-Kata Tjuṯa National Park. Under their joint Uluṟu-Kata Tjuṯa National Park Management Plan 2010–20, issued by the Director of National Parks under the Environment Protection and Biodiversity Conservation Act 1999, clause 6.3.3 provides that the Director and the Uluṟu-Kata Tjuṯa Board of Management should work to close the climb upon meeting any of three conditions: there were "adequate new visitor experiences", less than 20 per cent of visitors made the climb, or the "critical factors" in decisions to visit were "cultural and natural experiences". Despite cogent evidence that the second condition was met by July 2013, the climb remained open.

Several controversial incidents on top of Uluru in 2010, including a striptease, golfing and nudity, led to renewed calls for banning the climb. On 1 November 2017, the Uluṟu-Kata Tjuṯa National Park board voted unanimously to prohibit climbing Uluru. As a result, there was a surge in climbers and visitors after the ban was announced. The ban took effect on 26 October 2019, and the guide chains that aided climbers were removed.

A November 2017 NT News poll found that 63% of respondents did not support the ban. A 2019 Essential poll found that 44% supported the ban, while 30% opposed it.

=== Photography ===
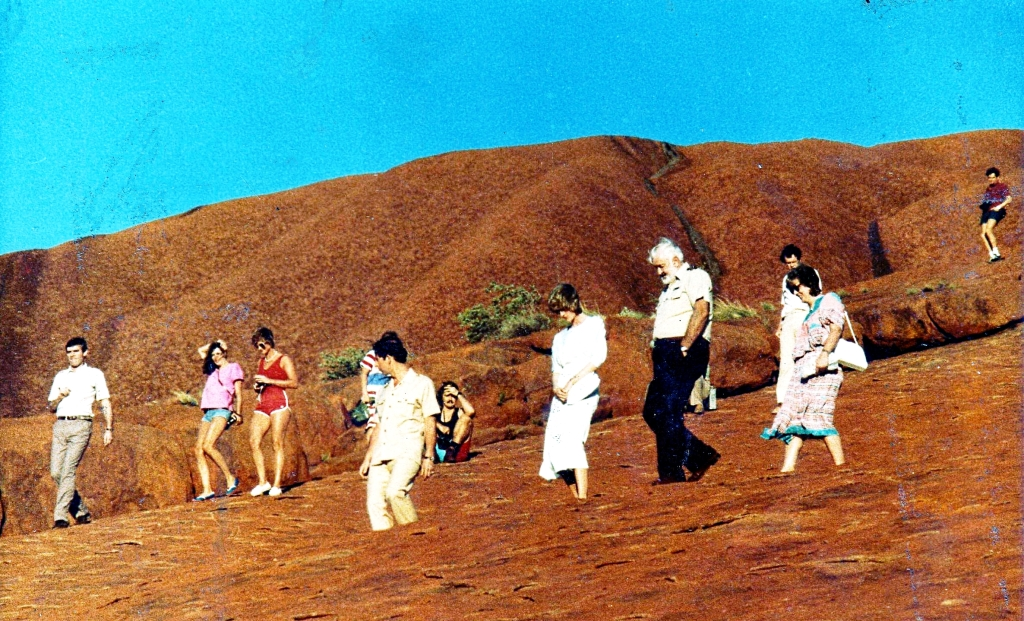
Then-Prince Charles and Princess Diana returning from photo session on Uluru, March 1983

The Aṉangu request that visitors do not photograph certain sections of Uluru, for reasons related to traditional Tjukurpa (Dreaming) beliefs. These areas are the sites of gender-linked rituals or ceremonies and are forbidden ground for Aṉangu of the opposite sex to those participating in the rituals in question. The photographic restriction is intended to prevent Aṉangu from inadvertently violating this taboo by encountering photographs of the forbidden sites in the outside world.

In September 2020, Parks Australia alerted Google Australia to the user-generated images from the Uluru summit that have been posted on the Google Maps platform and requested that the content be removed in accordance with the wishes of Aṉangu, Uluru's traditional owners, and the national park's Film and Photography Guidelines. Google agreed to the request.

=== Waterfalls ===
During heavy rain, which is rare in the region, ephemeral waterfalls cascade down the sides of Uluru. Large rainfall events occurred in 2016, and the summer of 2020–21.

== Geology ==
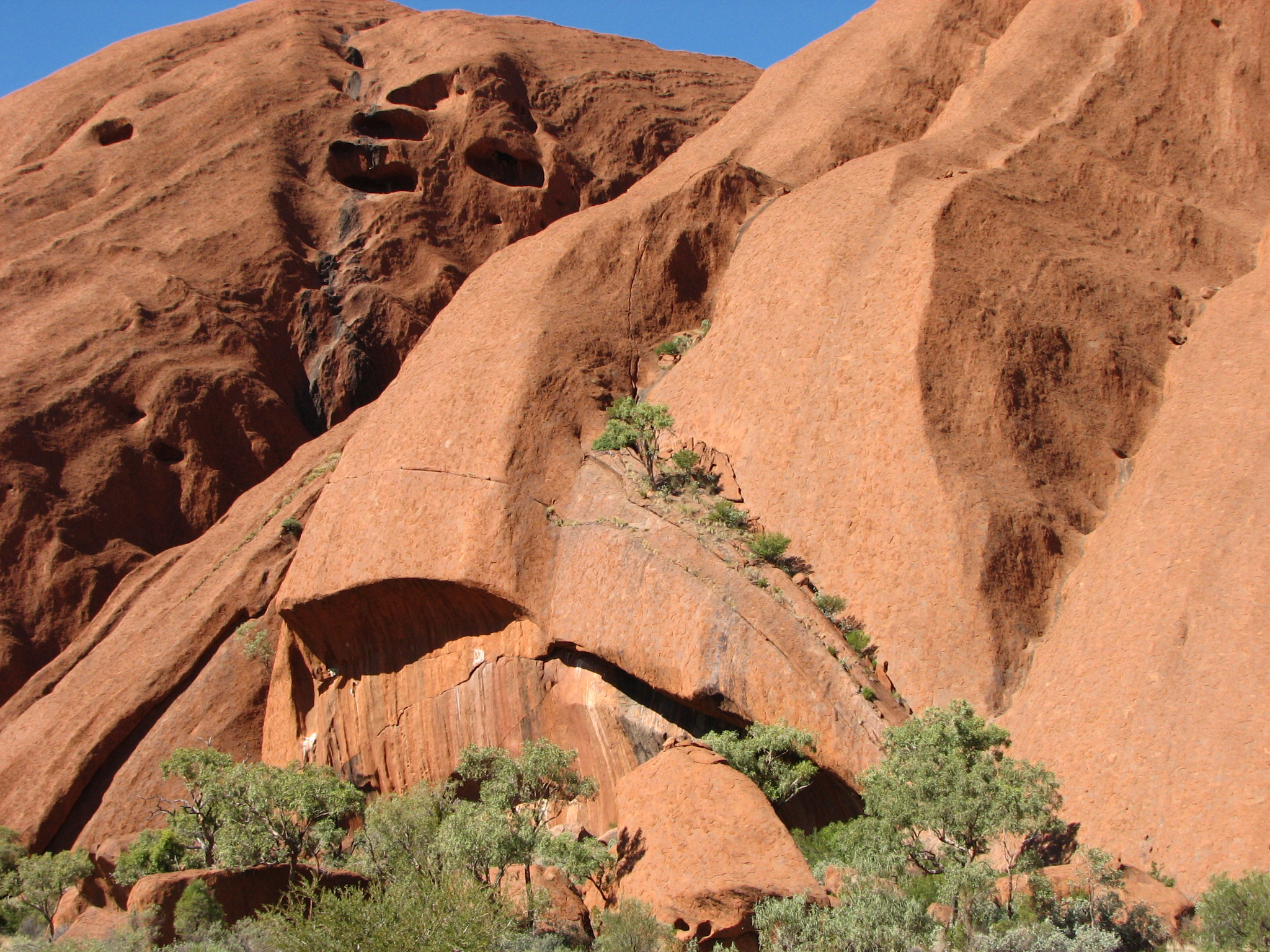
Uluru rock formations

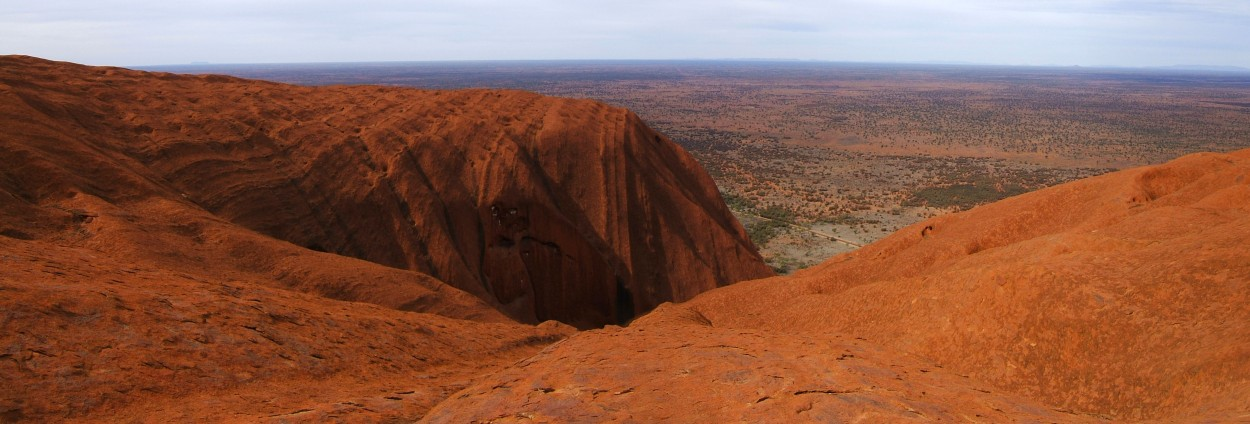
Panorama from the top of Uluru, showing a typical gully

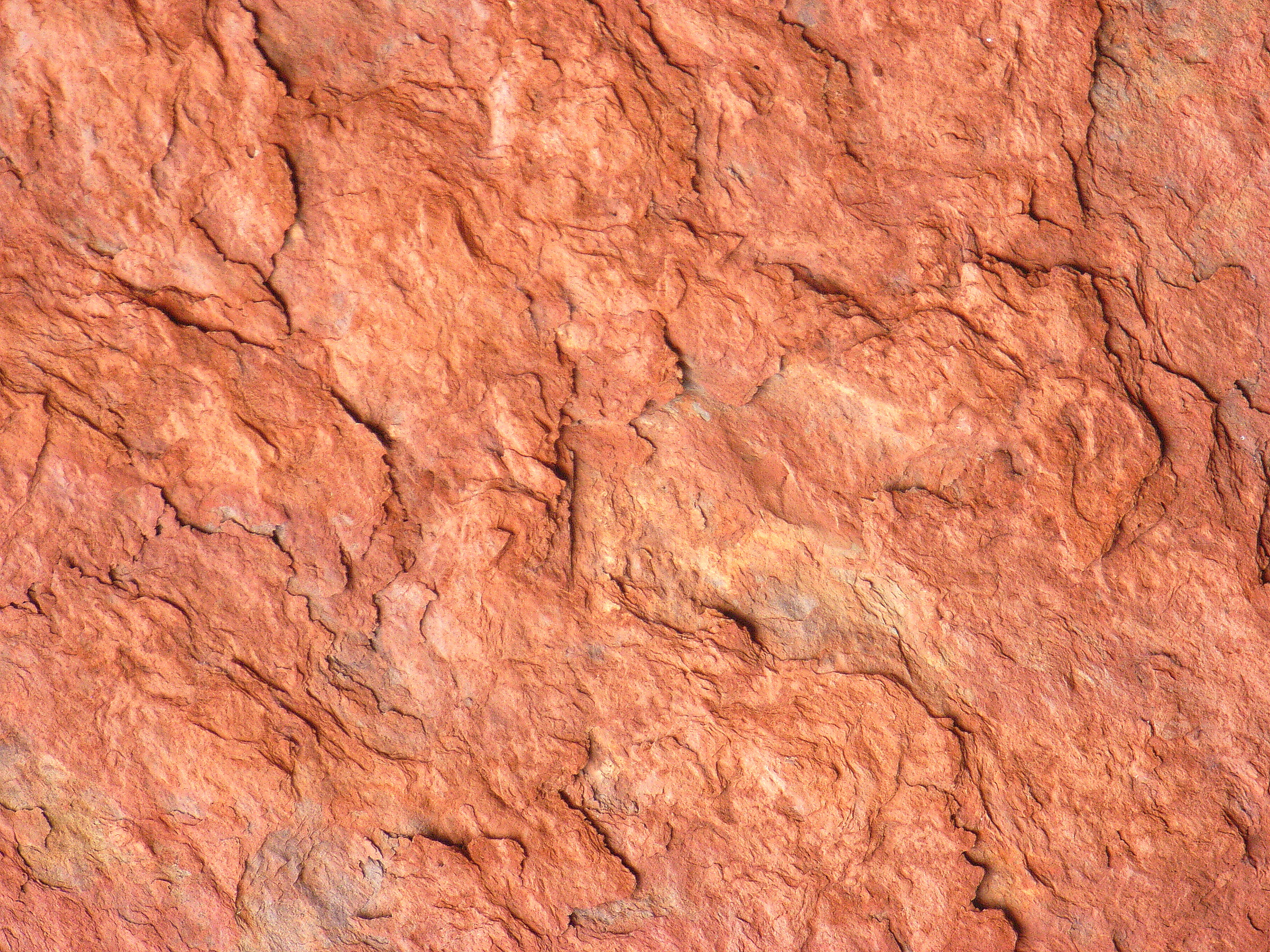
Close-up view of Uluru's surface, composed of arkose

Uluru is an inselberg. An inselberg is a prominent isolated residual knob or hill that rises abruptly from and is surrounded by extensive and relatively flat erosion lowlands in a hot, dry region. Uluru is also often referred to as a monolith, although this is an ambiguous term that is generally avoided by geologists.

Uluru's homogeneity and lack of jointing and parting at bedding surfaces inhibits the development of scree slopes and soil. These characteristics led to its survival, while the surrounding rocks were eroded.

For the purpose of mapping and describing the geological history of the area, geologists refer to the rock strata making up Uluru as the Mutitjulu Arkose, and it is one of many sedimentary formations filling the Amadeus Basin.

=== Composition ===
Uluru is dominantly composed of coarse-grained arkose (a type of sandstone characterised by an abundance of feldspar) and some conglomerate. Average composition is 50% feldspar, 25–35% quartz and up to 25% rock fragments; most feldspar is K-feldspar with only minor plagioclase as subrounded grains and highly altered inclusions within K-feldspar. The grains are typically 2–4 mm (0.08–0.16 in) in diameter, and are angular to subangular; the finer sandstone is well sorted, with sorting decreasing and with grain size increasing. The rock fragments include subrounded basalt, invariably replaced to various degrees by chlorite and epidote. The minerals present suggest derivation from a predominantly granite source, similar to the Musgrave Block exposed to the south. When relatively fresh, the rock has a grey colour, but weathering of iron-bearing minerals by the process of oxidation gives the outer surface layer of rock a red-brown rusty colour. Features related to deposition of the sediment include cross-bedding and ripples, analysis of which indicated deposition from broad shallow high energy fluvial channels and sheet flooding, typical of alluvial fans.

=== Age and origin ===
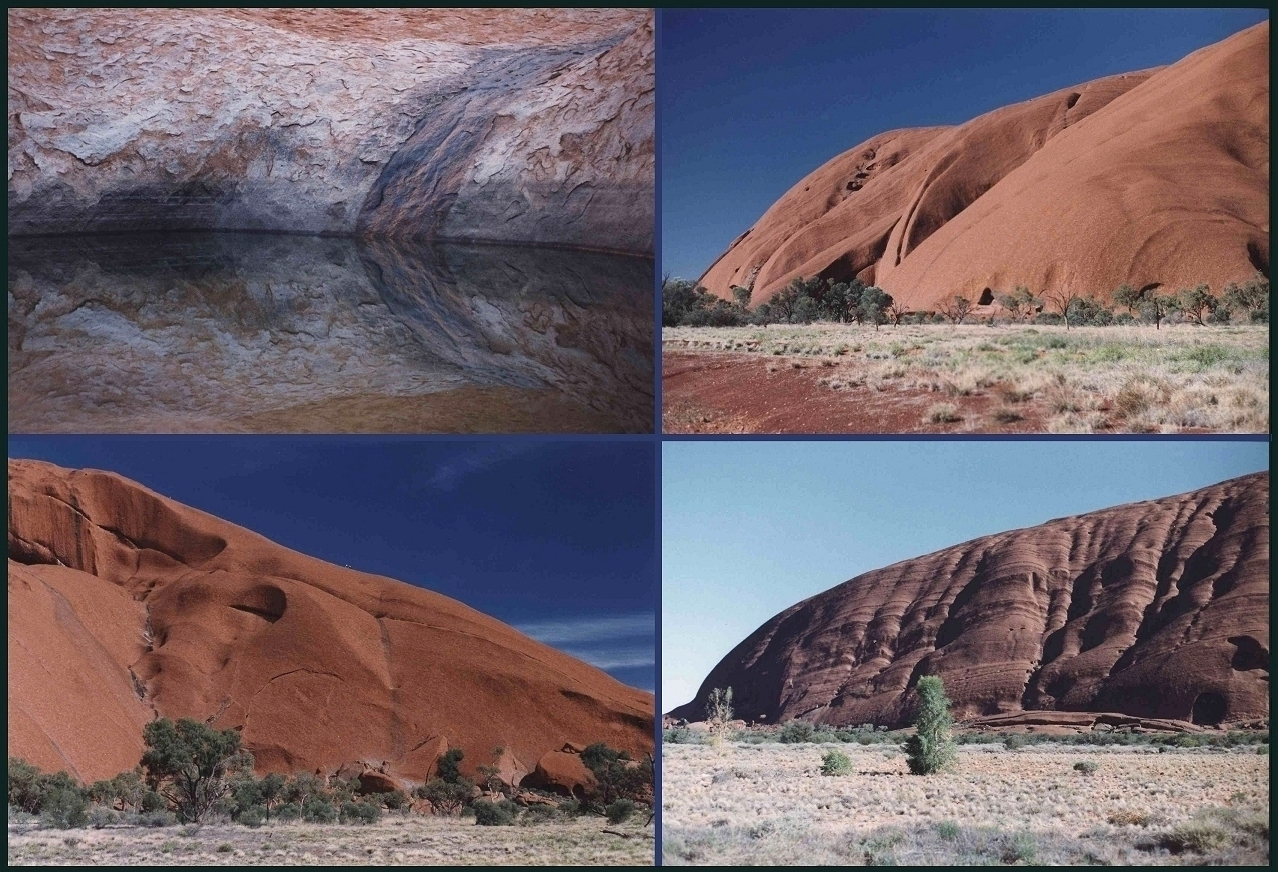
Rain water flows off Uluru along channels, marked by dark algae, forming small ponds at the base

The Mutitjulu Arkose is about the same age as the conglomerate at Kata Tjuta, and has a similar origin, despite the different rock type. It is younger than the rocks exposed to the east at Mount Conner, and unrelated to them. The strata at Uluru are nearly vertical, dipping to the south-west at 85°, and have an exposed thickness of at least 2,400 m (7,900 ft). The strata dip below the surrounding plain and no doubt extend well beyond Uluru in the subsurface, but the extent is not known.

The rock was originally sand, deposited as part of an extensive alluvial fan that extended out from the ancestors of the Musgrave, Mann and Petermann Ranges to the south and west, but separate from a nearby fan that deposited the sand, pebbles and cobbles that now make up Kata Tjuta.

The similar mineral composition of the Mutitjulu Arkose and the granite ranges to the south is now explained. The ancestors of the ranges to the south were once much larger than the eroded remnants we see today. They were thrust up during a mountain building episode referred to as the Petermann Orogeny that took place in late Neoproterozoic to early Cambrian times (550–530 Ma), and thus the Mutitjulu Arkose is believed to have been deposited at about the same time, hence then in Gondwana (now in Australia).

The arkose sandstone that makes up the formation is composed of grains that show little sorting based on grain size and exhibit very little rounding; the feldspars in the rock are relatively fresh in appearance. This lack of sorting and grain rounding is typical of arkosic sandstones and is indicative of relatively rapid erosion from the granites of the growing mountains to the south. The layers of sand were nearly horizontal when deposited, but were tilted to their near vertical position during a later episode of mountain building, possibly the Alice Springs Orogeny of Palaeozoic age (400–300 Ma).

== Aboriginal myths, legends and traditions ==
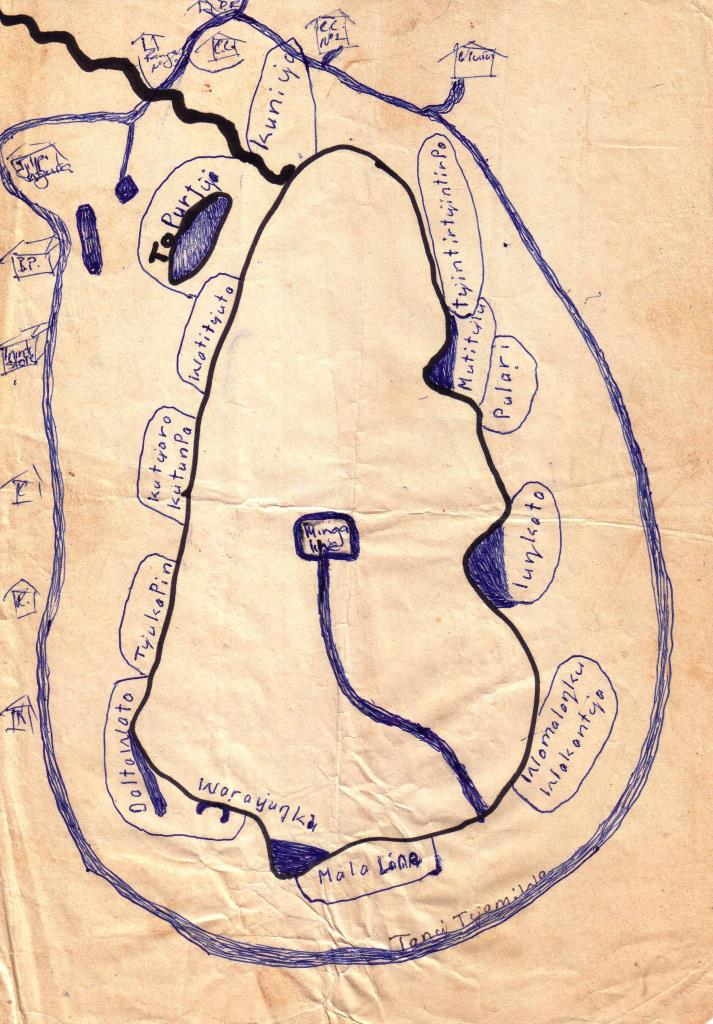
Tony Tjamiwa's map of Uluru

As with many sites around Australia, there are stories from The Dreaming associated with Uluru that date back thousands of years. According to the Aṉangu, traditional landowners of Uluru:

The world was once a featureless place. None of the places we know existed until creator beings, in the forms of people, plants and animals, travelled widely across the land. Then, in a process of creation and destruction, they formed the landscape as we know it today. Aṉangu land is still inhabited by the spirits of dozens of these ancestral creator beings which are referred to as Tjukuritja or Waparitja.

=== Creation of the rock ===
There are a number of differing accounts given, by outsiders, of Aboriginal ancestral stories for the origins of Uluru and its many cracks and fissures. One such account, taken from Robert Layton's (1989) Uluru: An Aboriginal history of Ayers Rock, reads as follows:

Uluru was built up during the creation period by two boys who played in the mud after rain. When they had finished their game they travelled south to Wiputa ... Fighting together, the two boys made their way to the table topped Mount Conner, on top of which their bodies are preserved as boulders. (Page 5)

Two other accounts are given in Norbert Brockman's (1997) Encyclopedia of Sacred Places. The first tells of serpents who waged many wars around Uluru, scarring the rock. The second tells of two tribes of ancestral spirits who were invited to a feast, but were distracted by the beautiful Sleepy Lizard Women and did not show up. In response, the angry hosts sang evil into a mud sculpture that came to life as the dingo. There followed a great battle, which ended in the deaths of the leaders of both tribes. The earth itself rose up in grief at the bloodshed, becoming Uluru.

=== Other stories ===
The Commonwealth Department of Environment's webpage advises:

Many other Tjukurpa such as Kalaya (emu), Liru (poisonous snake), Lungkata (blue-tongue lizard), Luunpa (kingfisher) and Tjintir-tjintirpa (willie wagtail) travel through Uluṟu-Kata Tjuṯa National Park. Other Tjukurpa affect only one specific area. Many exploits of Tjukurpa involve ancestral beings going underground. Kuniya, the woma python, lived in the rocks at Uluru where she fought the Liru, the poisonous snake.

It is sometimes reported that those who take rocks from the formation will be cursed and suffer misfortune. There have been many instances where people who removed such rocks attempted to mail them back to various agencies in an attempt to remove the perceived curse.

==== Mala story ====
One of the major stories associated with Uluru is the Mala story. In this, the Mala (rufous hare-wallaby) people came from the north, and decided to stay at Uluru for a while, and perform the ceremony known as inma. The men decorated and raised the ceremonial pole (Ngaltawata) and began inma, while the women gathered and prepared bush food, storing seed cakes (nyuma) in their caves. The men hunted, made fires, and fixed their tools and weapons. Two Wintalka men approached from the west, and invited the Mala people to attend their inma, but the Mala people declined the invitation, as their inma had begun and could not be stopped. The Wintalka men went back and told their people, who got angry and created an evil spirit, in the form of an enormous devil-dog called Kurpany, in order to wreck the Mala inma. Kurpany approached the Mala people, changing form as he did so, including taking the form of a ghost (mamu). Luunpa (the kingfisher woman) spied him first, and warned the Mala people; they did not listen to her. Kurpany attacked and killed some of the men, and the remaining Mala people fled southwards, into what is now the state of South Australia, with Kurpany in pursuit. This story continues among the Indigenous peoples of South Australia.

Aṉangu believe that the ancestors still exist at Uluru today. Luunpa, now a large rock, keeps watch, while the men killed by Kurpany are still in their cave. Kurpany's footprints, heading eastwards and southwards, are still in the rock. The teaching from this story is that people need to heed warnings of danger, and to finish what they have begun.

== Flora and fauna ==
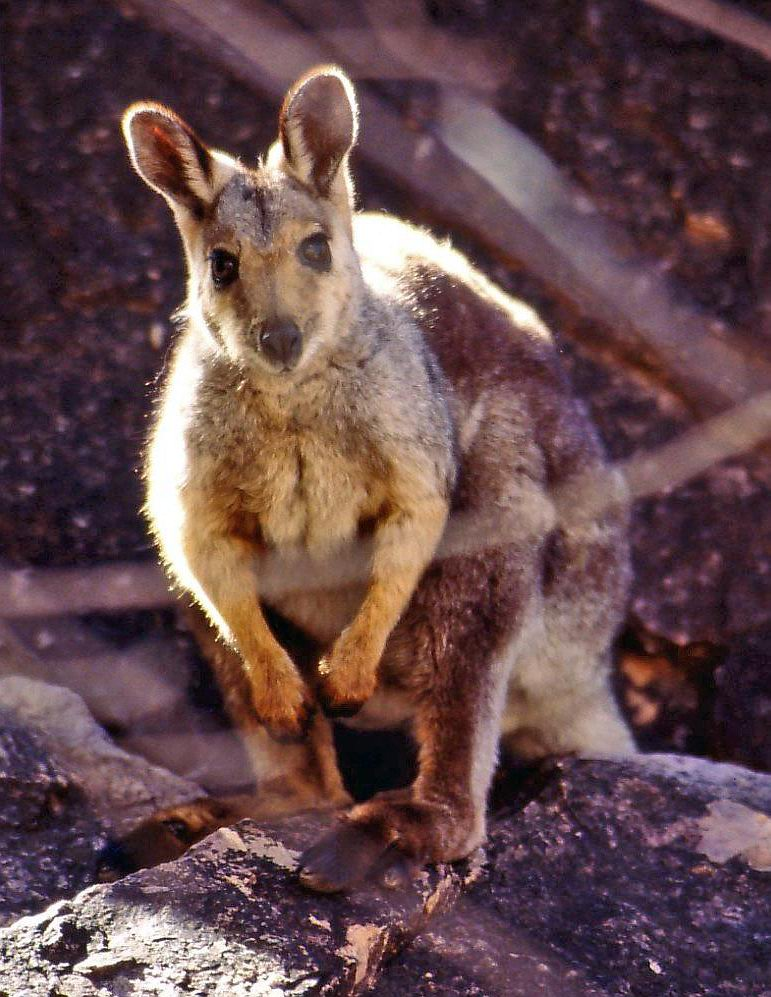
Black-flanked rock-wallaby near Uluru (Petrogale lateralis)

Historically, 46 species of native mammals are known to have been living near Uluru; according to recent surveys there are currently 21. Aṉangu acknowledge that a decrease in the number has implications for the condition and health of the landscape. Moves are supported for the reintroduction of locally extinct animals such as malleefowl, common brushtail possum, rufous hare-wallaby or mala, bilby, burrowing bettong and the black-flanked rock-wallaby.

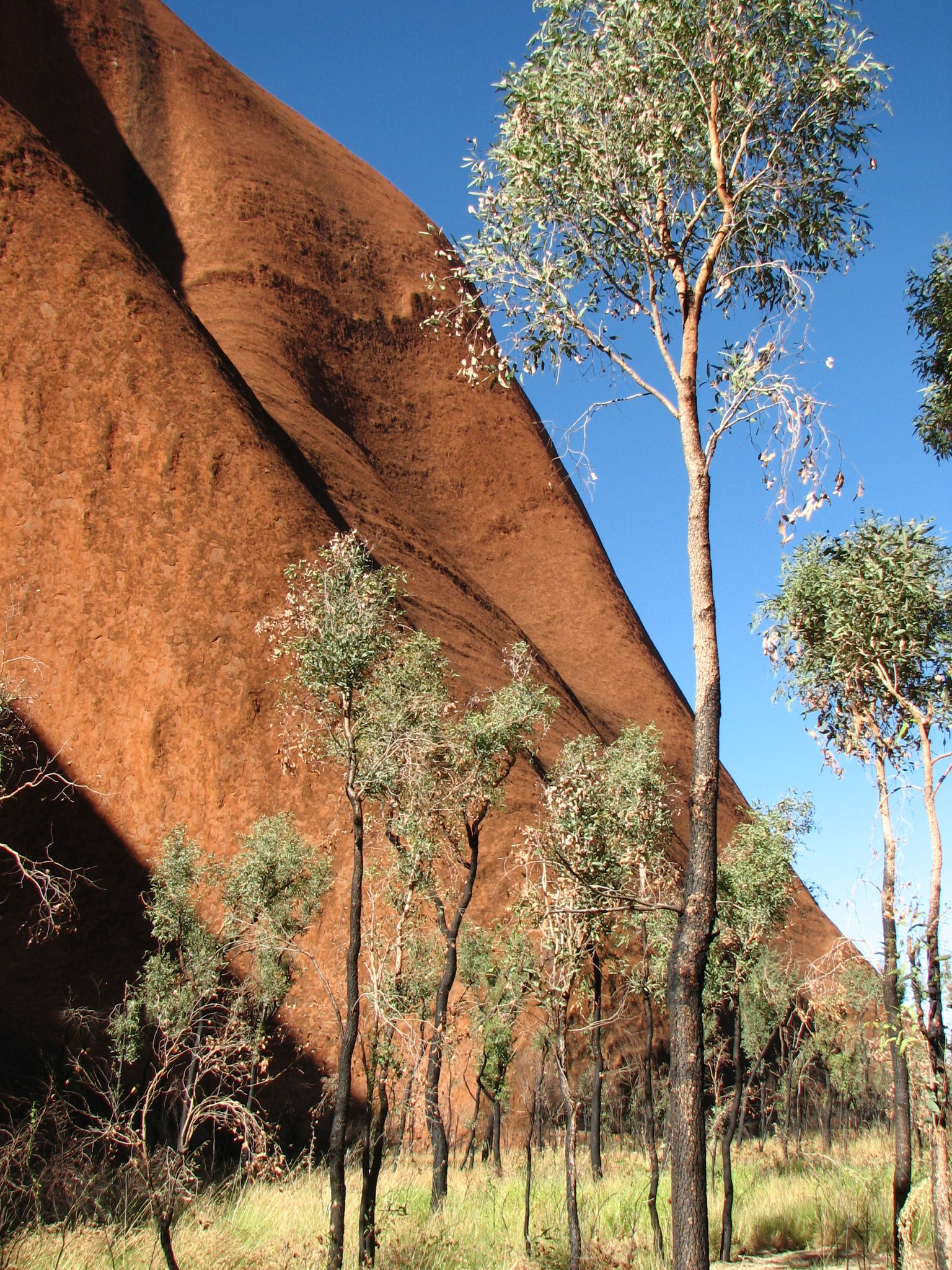
Trees at the base of Uluru

The mulgara is mostly restricted to the transitional sand plain area, a narrow band of country that stretches from the vicinity of Uluru to the northern boundary of the park and into Ayers Rock Resort. This area also contains the marsupial mole, woma python and great desert skink.

The bat population of the park comprises at least seven species that depend on day roosting sites within caves and crevices of Uluru and Kata Tjuta. Most of the bats forage for aerial prey within 100 m (300 ft) or so from the rock face. The park has a very rich reptile fauna of high conservation significance, with 73 species having been reliably recorded. Four species of frogs are abundant at the base of Uluru and Kata Tjuta following summer rains. The great desert skink is listed as vulnerable.

Aṉangu continue to hunt and gather animal species in remote areas of the park and on Aṉangu land elsewhere. Hunting is largely confined to the red kangaroo, bush turkey, emu and lizards such as the sand goanna and perentie.

Of the 27 mammal species found in the park, 6 are introduced: the house mouse, camel, fox, cat, dog and rabbit. These species are distributed throughout the park, but their densities are greatest near the rich water run-off areas of Uluru and Kata Tjuta.

Uluṟu-Kata Tjuṯa National Park flora represents a large portion of plants found in Central Australia. A number of these species are considered rare and restricted in the park or the immediate region. Many rare and endemic plants are found in the park.

The growth and reproduction of plant communities rely on irregular rainfall. Some plants are able to survive fire and some are dependent on it to reproduce. Plants are an important part of Tjukurpa, and ceremonies are held for each of the major plant foods. Many plants are associated with ancestors.

Flora in Uluṟu-Kata Tjuṯa National Park can be broken into these categories:

- Punu – trees
- Puti – shrubs
- Tjulpun-tjulpunpa – flowers
- Ukiri – grasses

Trees such as the mulga and centralian bloodwood are used to make tools such as spearheads, boomerangs and bowls. The red sap of the bloodwood is used as a disinfectant and an inhalant for coughs and colds.

Several rare and endangered species are found in the park. Most of them, like adder's tongue ferns, are restricted to the moist areas at the base of the formation, which are areas of high visitor use and subject to erosion.

Since the first Europeans arrived, 34 exotic plant species have been recorded in the park, representing about 6.4% of the total park flora. Some, such as perennial buffel grass (Cenchrus ciliaris), were introduced to rehabilitate areas damaged by erosion. It is the most threatening weed in the park and has spread to invade water- and nutrient-rich drainage lines. A few others, such as burrgrass, were brought in accidentally, carried on cars and people.

== Climate and five seasons ==
The park has a hot desert climate and receives an average rainfall of 284.6 mm (11.2 in) per year. The average high temperature in summer (December–January) is 37.8 °C (100.0 °F), and the average low temperature in winter (June–July) is 4.7 °C (40.5 °F). Temperature extremes in the park have been recorded at 46 °C (115 °F) during summer and −5 °C (23 °F) during winter. UV levels are extreme between October and March, averaging between 11 and 15 on the UV index.

Local Aboriginal people recognise five seasons:

1. Wanitjunkupai (April/May) – Cooler weather
2. Wari (June/July) – Cold season bringing morning frosts
3. Piriyakutu (August/September/October) – Animals breed and food plants flower
4. Mai Wiyaringkupai (November/December) – The hot season when food becomes scarce
5. Itjanu (January/February/March) – Sporadic storms can roll in suddenly

Climate data for Yulara Aero (1991–2020 normals, extremes 1983–present)
Month	Jan	Feb	Mar	Apr	May	Jun	Jul	Aug	Sep	Oct	Nov	Dec	Year
Record high °C (°F)	46.8 (116.2)	45.8 (114.4)	45.3 (113.5)	39.6 (103.3)	35.7 (96.3)	31.7 (89.1)	31.1 (88.0)	37.5 (99.5)	38.7 (101.7)	42.3 (108.1)	45.2 (113.4)	47.1 (116.8)	47.1 (116.8)
Mean maximum °C (°F)	43.5 (110.3)	42.4 (108.3)	40.1 (104.2)	36.5 (97.7)	31.4 (88.5)	27.4 (81.3)	27.8 (82.0)	31.4 (88.5)	36.2 (97.2)	39.7 (103.5)	41.8 (107.2)	43.0 (109.4)	44.4 (111.9)
Mean daily maximum °C (°F)	38.5 (101.3)	37.2 (99.0)	34.5 (94.1)	30.0 (86.0)	24.3 (75.7)	20.5 (68.9)	20.8 (69.4)	24.0 (75.2)	28.9 (84.0)	32.6 (90.7)	35.0 (95.0)	36.7 (98.1)	30.3 (86.5)
Daily mean °C (°F)	30.7 (87.3)	29.7 (85.5)	27.0 (80.6)	22.4 (72.3)	16.8 (62.2)	12.9 (55.2)	12.7 (54.9)	14.9 (58.8)	20.0 (68.0)	23.9 (75.0)	26.8 (80.2)	28.7 (83.7)	22.2 (72.0)
Mean daily minimum °C (°F)	23.0 (73.4)	22.2 (72.0)	19.6 (67.3)	14.6 (58.3)	9.3 (48.7)	5.6 (42.1)	4.5 (40.1)	6.1 (43.0)	10.8 (51.4)	15.2 (59.4)	18.6 (65.5)	21.1 (70.0)	14.2 (57.6)
Mean minimum °C (°F)	17.4 (63.3)	16.4 (61.5)	13.0 (55.4)	8.1 (46.6)	3.6 (38.5)	0.1 (32.2)	−0.8 (30.6)	0.5 (32.9)	3.9 (39.0)	8.3 (46.9)	12.2 (54.0)	14.7 (58.5)	−1.1 (30.0)
Record low °C (°F)	12.7 (54.9)	12.1 (53.8)	8.0 (46.4)	4.1 (39.4)	1.1 (34.0)	−2.7 (27.1)	−3.6 (25.5)	−2.3 (27.9)	−1.0 (30.2)	3.7 (38.7)	6.5 (43.7)	9.9 (49.8)	−3.6 (25.5)
Average rainfall mm (inches)	29.5 (1.16)	34.6 (1.36)	30.9 (1.22)	13.9 (0.55)	13.0 (0.51)	19.1 (0.75)	14.7 (0.58)	4.8 (0.19)	9.6 (0.38)	21.7 (0.85)	33.5 (1.32)	41.4 (1.63)	269.0 (10.59)
Average rainy days (≥ 1 mm)	3.5	2.6	2.1	1.6	1.6	1.7	1.6	1.0	1.6	2.9	4.1	4.5	28.8
Source: Bureau of Meteorology

Climate data for Uluru (1967–1983)
Month	Jan	Feb	Mar	Apr	May	Jun	Jul	Aug	Sep	Oct	Nov	Dec	Year
Record high °C (°F)	45.0 (113.0)	45.0 (113.0)	43.5 (110.3)	38.0 (100.4)	32.8 (91.0)	29.2 (84.6)	31.0 (87.8)	33.3 (91.9)	37.5 (99.5)	42.0 (107.6)	44.5 (112.1)	46.0 (114.8)	46.0 (114.8)
Mean maximum °C (°F)	43.2 (109.8)	41.4 (106.5)	38.6 (101.5)	35.1 (95.2)	29.6 (85.3)	26.2 (79.2)	26.4 (79.5)	30.1 (86.2)	34.1 (93.4)	38.4 (101.1)	40.7 (105.3)	42.2 (108.0)	43.9 (111.0)
Mean daily maximum °C (°F)	37.5 (99.5)	36.0 (96.8)	33.4 (92.1)	28.7 (83.7)	23.4 (74.1)	20.3 (68.5)	20.3 (68.5)	22.6 (72.7)	26.4 (79.5)	31.4 (88.5)	34.2 (93.6)	36.8 (98.2)	29.3 (84.6)
Daily mean °C (°F)	29.2 (84.6)	28.3 (82.9)	25.4 (77.7)	20.5 (68.9)	15.7 (60.3)	12.6 (54.7)	11.9 (53.4)	14.1 (57.4)	17.8 (64.0)	22.5 (72.5)	25.6 (78.1)	28.3 (82.9)	21.0 (69.8)
Mean daily minimum °C (°F)	20.9 (69.6)	20.5 (68.9)	17.3 (63.1)	12.2 (54.0)	7.9 (46.2)	4.9 (40.8)	3.4 (38.1)	5.5 (41.9)	9.1 (48.4)	13.5 (56.3)	17.0 (62.6)	19.7 (67.5)	12.7 (54.8)
Mean minimum °C (°F)	14.6 (58.3)	14.9 (58.8)	11.2 (52.2)	6.0 (42.8)	1.9 (35.4)	−0.4 (31.3)	−1.8 (28.8)	−0.5 (31.1)	2.6 (36.7)	6.7 (44.1)	10.1 (50.2)	13.2 (55.8)	−2.4 (27.7)
Record low °C (°F)	8.9 (48.0)	11.1 (52.0)	8.5 (47.3)	3.0 (37.4)	−0.5 (31.1)	−3.5 (25.7)	−5.0 (23.0)	−4.0 (24.8)	1.5 (34.7)	3.6 (38.5)	5.5 (41.9)	10.5 (50.9)	−5.0 (23.0)
Average rainfall mm (inches)	47.7 (1.88)	45.8 (1.80)	49.5 (1.95)	25.0 (0.98)	21.6 (0.85)	21.1 (0.83)	9.2 (0.36)	13.2 (0.52)	18.7 (0.74)	23.5 (0.93)	34.5 (1.36)	18.8 (0.74)	328.6 (12.94)
Average rainy days (≥ 1 mm)	3.7	3.8	3.4	2.4	2.6	2.6	1.6	2.5	2.6	3.1	4.3	2.7	35.3
Source: Bureau of Meteorology

== See also ==
- Death of Azaria Chamberlain
- Indigenous Australian art
- List of individual rocks
- List of mountains of the Northern Territory
- Pitjantjatjara § Recognition of sacred sites
- Protected areas of the Northern Territory
- Tietkens expedition of 1889
- Uluru Statement from the Heart
