= William Gosse (surgeon) =

- Born: 1813; Carbonear, Newfoundland
- Died: 1883 (aged 69–70)
- Medical career
- Profession: Surgeon

William Gosse (c. 1813 – 20 July 1883) was a medical practitioner in the early days of South Australia.

== Life ==
Dr. William Gosse was born in Carbonear, Newfoundland, where his father John Gosse Sr. (1767–1834) was a partner in the firm of Gosse, Pack & Fryer. The family left for Poole, in Dorsetshire, United Kingdom around 1817. He was educated at Mr. Buller's school at Southampton, then commenced medical studies with a Mr. Salter in Poole. He entered Guy's Hospital as a pupil of his brother-in-law, the surgeon Mr. Morgan. He set up a practice in Hoddesdon in Hertfordshire, where he married Agnes Grant, of London. They remained there for fifteen years, then left for Australia, hoping the warmer climate would improve his bronchitis. They landed in Melbourne in 1850, but only remained there a week or so, and moved to Adelaide, arriving on 31 December 1850. In 1851 he joined the rush to the Victorian gold diggings, but soon returned empty-handed to South Australia.

He next went into partnership with Dr. Benjamin Archer Kent (1808 – 25 November 1864), for whom Kent Town is named. In 1853 he was appointed Colonial Surgeon, having the supervision of the Hospital, the Lunatic Asylum, and the Gaol. On resigning that position in 1857 he joined Dr. Anton Bayer and continued in practice with him until the latter's death in 1866. He then entered into partnership with Dr. H. Thomas Whittell (1826 – 21 August 1899) and, apart from a time around 1870 when he travelled to London to receive his F.R.C.S. diploma and to Heidelberg to receive his M.D., remained with him until 1873, when he was joined by his son, Dr. Charles Gosse, newly returned from gaining qualifications in Britain.

He was elected to the Adelaide Hospital's first Board of Management and also appointed as honorary surgeon, a position he held until 1876 when he retired, and was appointed consulting surgeon.

== Interests ==
In his youth he had an interest in natural history, which was developed by collecting specimens for the great naturalist Philip Henry Gosse, a cousin of his father.

For about fifteen years he was a Governor of the South Australian Institute.

He helped Julia Farr found in 1878 the Home for Incurables, with which he had a continued association until his death.

He was appointed visitor to the Parkside Lunatic Asylum, and held that position for many years.

He was elected the first Warden of the Senate of the University of Adelaide, which position he filled until the time of his death, with one interval.

He was an active member of the Church of England Synod, representing Trinity Church, North Terrace, until he moved to Wakefield Street, Kent Town.

He was the first President of the South Australian Medical Society, only the second branch of the British Medical Association to be established outside the UK.

He was the first medical officer in South Australia for the Australian Mutual Provident Society and remained connected with that body for twenty years, being a founding member of its local Board, on which he remained until his death.

He was a member of the Adelaide Literary Society

== Family ==
He had a sister (c. 1806 – 10 March 1869) who never married, and died in England. His brother John Gosse J.P. (c. 1809 – 20 March 1877) married Ann Maria (c. 1819 – 25 August 1884). His nephew John Gosse M.R.C.S.E. (c. 1846 – 29 December 1896) practised for a while at Mount Pleasant, then for 20 years at Wallaroo. He married Mary Bennet on 4 March 1874.

William Gosse (c. 1813 – 21 July 1883) married Agnes Grant (c. 1811 – 18 June 1891). Their family included:

- Agnes Grant Gosse (1837–1909) married Alexander Hay (1820–1898) on 13 March 1872. She was the author of After-Glow Memories (1905), Malcolm Canmore's Pearl (1907), Archibald Menzies (1908) and Footprints: A Memoir of the Late Alexander Hay (1899). She and her daughter Helen died with the sinking of SS Waratah, just a year after their mansion "Mount Breckan House" was destroyed by fire.
- Mary (c. 1838 – 1 February 1924) married Alexander "Alick" Melville ( – 16 October 1871) on 7 December 1859
- David Grant Gosse (c. 1841 – 1 July 1880) married Emily Sarah Fenn ( – c. 11 August 1896), daughter of Charles Fenn, on 8 April 1869
- William Christie Gosse (11 December 1842 – 12 August 1881), the noted explorer, married Gertrude Ritchie ( – 10 May 1869 at Robe) on 8 December 1868. He married again, to step-niece Agnes "Aggie" Hay (7 July 1854 – 27 October 1933), a daughter of brother-in-law Alexander Hay by his first wife, on 22 December 1874. He died of a heart attack.

- James Henry Gosse (20 December 1876 – 1952)
- Edith Agnes Hay (2 July 1878 – 1975)

- Henry "Harry" (c. 1848 – 2 June 1888) married Elizabeth ?? (died 22? 27? April 1890) in 1876. He was for a time manager of Delamere Station, near Katherine, Northern Territory, but was tin mining in the area when he perished, apparently lost and bewildered.
- Dr Charles Gosse (c. 1849 – 1 July 1885), ophthalmic surgeon, married Mary Blanche Hawker (daughter of George Charles Hawker) on 11 May 1880. He died after a horse vehicle accident and resultant gangrene.

- Mary Katrine Gosse (17 March 1881 – )

Their home from 1854 was on King William Street; from 1858 in Grenfell Street, from 1862 on North Terrace, and from 1880 on Wakefield Street, Kent Town.

== Recognition ==
The Gosse Wing of the Home for Incurables was named in his honour, and opened by his son Charles in 1884.
