= William Gosse (explorer) =

Australian explorer (1842–1881)

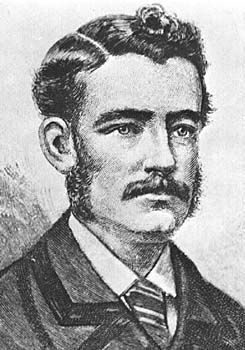
William Gosse

William Christie Gosse (11 December 1842–12 August 1881) was an Australian explorer, remembered for his 1873 expedition to Central Australia, whose purpose was to explore the area south of Alice Springs and west of the Transcontinental Telegraph Line. He made useful additions to the discoveries of Ernest Giles.

== Biography ==
Gosse was born on 11 December 1842 in Hoddesdon, Hertfordshire, England and immigrated to Australia with his father William Gosse, a medical doctor, in 1850. He was educated at J. L. Young's Adelaide Educational Institution and in 1859 he entered the Government service of the colony of South Australia. He held various positions in the survey department, including Deputy Surveyor-General.

Gosse left Alice Springs on 21 April 1873 with a party comprising Edwin S. Berry (another AEI boy) as second-in-charge; Henry Winnall and Patrick Nilan, three Afghans (Kamran, Jemma Kahn, and Allanah), an Aboriginal boy named Moses from The Peake. On 19 June they sighted the rock now known as Uluru, which he named Ayers Rock as a compliment to Sir Henry Ayers. They explored it thoroughly, noting caves used as shelters by Aboriginals, and decorated. They found a spur along which it was possible for Gosse and Kamran to scramble two miles to the summit, 1,100 ft (340 m) above the surrounding country.

The party reached a point 600 miles (970 km) west of the Transcontinental Telegraph Line and were forced to return due to lack of available water. The horses were suffering through being forced through spinifex grass, and on 17 September he decided to turn back.

They reached Charlotte Waters on Friday 19 December 1873.

== Death and legacy ==
Gosse died of a heart attack on 12 August 1881, aged 38, after a long illness.

Although Gosse's exploration was not groundbreaking, he filled in many details in the central Australia map.

- He named the Musgrave Ranges and was able correctly to lay down the position of some of the discoveries of Ernest Giles.
- On 19 July 1873 he reached an inselberg and gave it the name Ayers Rock. He was the first European man to climb the rock, along with an Afghan member of his party, Kamran.
- Mount Conner in the Northern Territory was named after Mountifort Conner by Gosse in 1873.

=== Recognition ===
The logbook of his expedition was praised by Goyder.

In 1931, the Hundred of Gosse, a cadastral division located on Kangaroo Island in South Australia was named in Gosse's memory.

In 1976 he was honoured on a postage stamp bearing his portrait issued by Australia Post.

== Family ==
Gosse married Gertrude Ritchie in 1860, who died of typhoid fever five months later.

Gosse married Agnes "Aggie" Hay (1853–1933), a daughter of Alexander Hay and his first wife Agnes née Kelly (1818–1870) on 22 December 1874. (Hay's second wife, Agnes Grant née Gosse, was William's sister.) William and Aggie had three children:

- William Hay Gosse MC (1875–1918) was killed in action in France. He married Muriel, née Davidson, who died in 1920. Their son George Gosse (1912–1964) was awarded the George Cross in 1946;
- Sir James Hay Gosse (1876–1952) married Joanna Lang, daughter of Tom Elder Barr Smith – they had a daughter and four sons; and
- Edith Agnes Gosse (1878-).

Harry Gosse ( 1888), the eldest son of Dr. William Gosse, died around 1 June 1888, four miles north of Delamere Station, where he had been working.

A brother-in-law, and also nephew, William Gosse Hay (1875–1945) was an author.

A sister-in-law, and also niece, Helen (1877–1909), and her mother (William's sister), were lost at sea on the ill-fated SS Waratah.

Other descendants include former Australian Minister for Foreign Affairs and Liberal Party leader Alexander Downer.

== See also ==
- Gosses Bluff crater
- Gosse, South Australia
