= Deserts of Australia =

Great Australian Desert
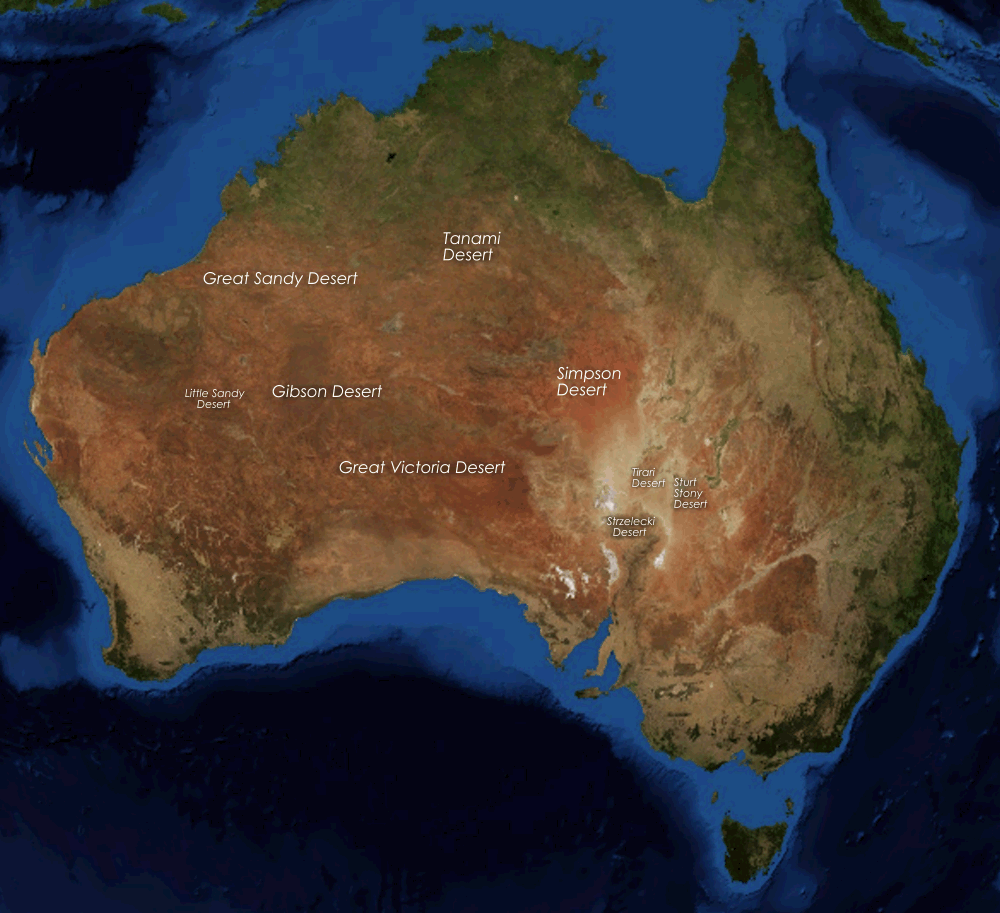
- The Great Australian Desert is the fifth-largest desert by area after the Antarctic, the Arctic, the Sahara, and the Arabian Desert.

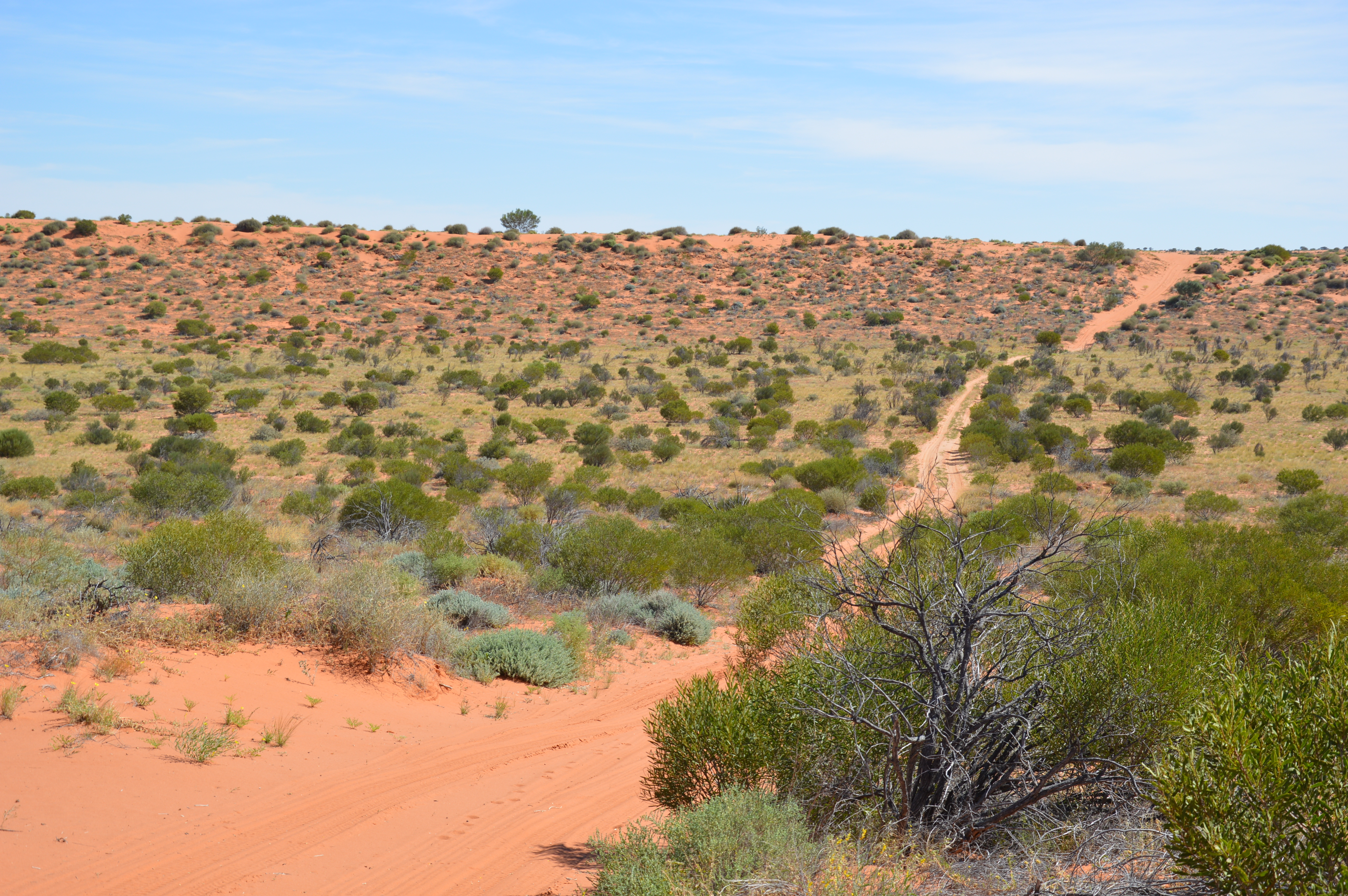
- Typical landscape (Simpson Desert)
- Length: 4,710 km (2,930 mi)
- Width: 1,890 km (1,170 mi)
- Area: 1,371,000 km^{2} (529,000 mi^{2})

Geography
- Country: Australia
- States: List: Northern Territory; Queensland; South Australia; New South Wales; Western Australia
- Coordinates: 24.57°S 137.42°E

Deserts (primarily the Great Australian Desert) cover about 1,371,000 km^{2} (529,000 sq mi), or 18%, of the Australian mainland, but about 35% of the Australian continent receives so little rain that it is practically desert (other "deserts"). Collectively known as the Great Australian desert, they are primarily distributed throughout the Western Plateau and interior lowlands of the country, covering areas from South West Queensland, the Far West region of New South Wales and Spencer Gulf in South Australia to the Barkly Tableland in Northern Territory and the interior of Western Australia. Parts of the Mallee in Victoria are named as deserts; (Note: The Little Desert, Big Desert and Sunset Desert.) the region is described as semi-desert.

By international standards, the Great Australian desert receives relatively high rates of rainfall, around 250 mm (10 in) on average, but due to the high evapotranspiration it would be correspondingly arid. No Australian weather stations situated in an arid region record less than 100 mm (3.94 in) of average annual rainfall. The deserts in the interior and south lack any significant summer rains. The desert in Western Australia is well explained by the little evaporation of the cold sea current of the West Australian Current, of polar origin, which prevents significant rainfall in the interior of the continent. About 40% of Australia is covered by dunes. Australia is the driest inhabited continent, with the least fertile soils.

In addition to being mostly uninhabited, the Great Australian Desert is diverse, where it consists of semi-desert grassy or mountainous landscapes, xeric shrubs, salt pans, gibber (stony) deserts, red sand dunes, sandstone mesas, rocky plains, open tree savannahs and bushland with a few rivers and salt lakes, which are mostly seasonally dry and often have no outflow in the east. The 3 million km^{2} (1.2 million sq mi) desert is among the least modified in the world. The Australian desert has the largest population of feral camels in the world.

== History ==
=== Geological ===
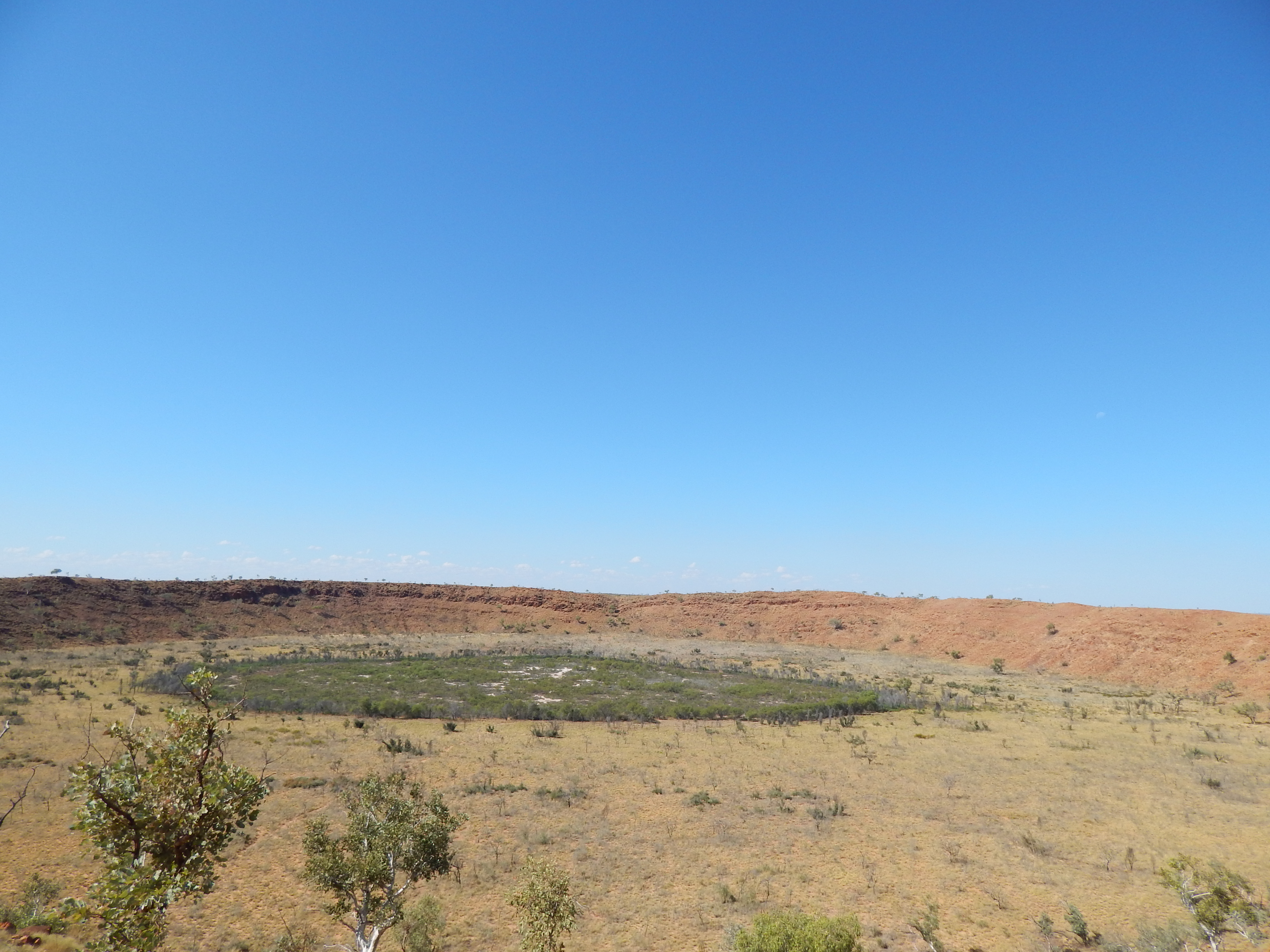
Wolfe Creek Crater in Western Australia

The area's geology spans a geological time period of over 3.8 billion years, therefore featuring some of the oldest rocks on earth. There are three main cratonic shields of recognised Archaean age within the Australian landmass: The Yilgarn, the Pilbara and the Gawler cratons. Several other Archaean-Proterozoic orogenic belts exist, usually sandwiched around the edges of these major cratonic shields. The history of the Archaean cratons is extremely complex and protracted. The cratons appear to have been accumulated to form the greater Australian landmass in the late Archaean to meso-Proterozoic, (~2400 Ma to 1,600 Ma).

Chiefly the Capricorn Orogeny is partly responsible for the assembly of the West Australian landmass by connecting the Yilgarn and Pilbara cratons. The Capricorn Orogeny is exposed in the rocks of the Bangemall Basin, Gascoyne Complex granite-gneisses and the Glengarry, Yerrida and Padbury basins. Unknown Proterozoic orogenic belts, possibly similar to the Albany Complex in southern Western Australia and the Musgrave Block, represent the Proterozoic link between the Yilgarn and Gawler cratons, covered by the Proterozoic-Palaeozoic Officer and Amadeus basins.

=== Aboriginal ===
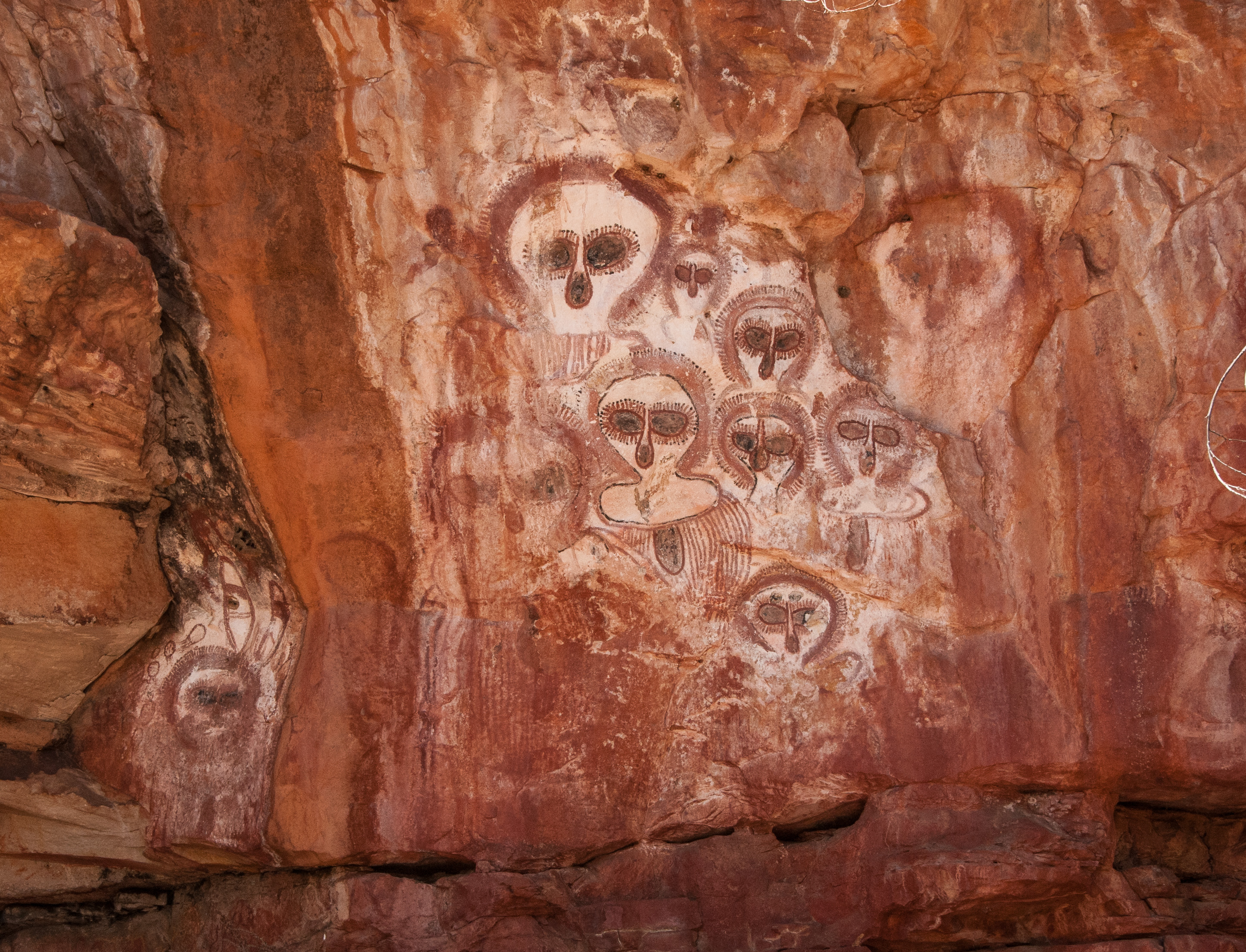
Pictographs known as Wandjina in the Wunnumurra Gorge, Barnett River, Kimberley, Western Australia

Indigenous Australians have lived in the desert for at least 50,000 years and occupied all Outback regions, including the driest deserts, when Europeans first entered central Australia in the 1800s. Many Indigenous Australians retain strong physical and cultural links to their traditional country and are legally recognised as the traditional owners of large parts of the Outback under Commonwealth Native Title legislation.

Aboriginal tribes and clans have been nomadic in the desert areas for thousands of years. They subsisted on the local flora and fauna, now known as bush food, and made sure that their sources of drinking water remained intact. The nomads moved in clearly demarcated tribal areas. For example, important tribes living in the desert areas include the Arrernte, Luritja and Pitjantjatjara. The latter tribe's sphere of influence extended from Uluṟu to the Nullarbor Plain. The Dieri tribe lives in a large area of the Simpson, Strzelecki and Tirari deserts.

The rock art and archaeological site at Karnatukul was, until recently, estimated to have been inhabited for up to 25,000 years, and known as the site of the oldest continuous recorded occupation in the Western Desert cultural region. Karnakatul shows one of the earliest uses of firewood, and habitation continued through times of extreme climate change, when the desertification occurred as the polar ice sheets expanded. The oldest examples of rock art, in Western Australia's Pilbara region and the Olary district of South Australia, are estimated to be up to around 40,000 years old. The oldest firmly dated evidence of rock art painting in Australia is a charcoal drawing on a small rock fragment found during the excavation of the Narwala Gabarnmang rock shelter in south-western Arnhem Land in the Northern Territory.

The isolated desert areas remained undeveloped for a long time. For example, the Spinifex people first had contact with whites in the 1950s, when they were expelled from their tribal lands because of nuclear weapons testing (1950–1963) by the British and Australian governments. The Pintupi Nine, a group of nine Aboriginal people of the Pintupi tribe, lived a nomadic hunter-gatherer lifestyle in the Gibson Desert until October 1984, when they first encountered whites as they left the desert. Both discoveries were sensations at the time. Later, in 1986, the Richters family, the last Aboriginals to live as hunter-gatherers, were found in the Great Victoria Desert.

Large parts of the Australian desert areas are part of the Desert Cultural Area. Important cultural sites include Uluṟu and Kata Tjuṯa. Aboriginal Australians of the desert produced many important artists, one of the first and most famous being Albert Namatjira, who was born in Hermannsburg in the Great Sandy Desert. About a third of Australia's deserts are now Aboriginal lands. A very large part of it is managed by them as a nature reserve. A number of tribes have land use rights for almost all other desert regions. Today, numerous Aboriginal peoples live in settlements in the deserts.

=== European ===
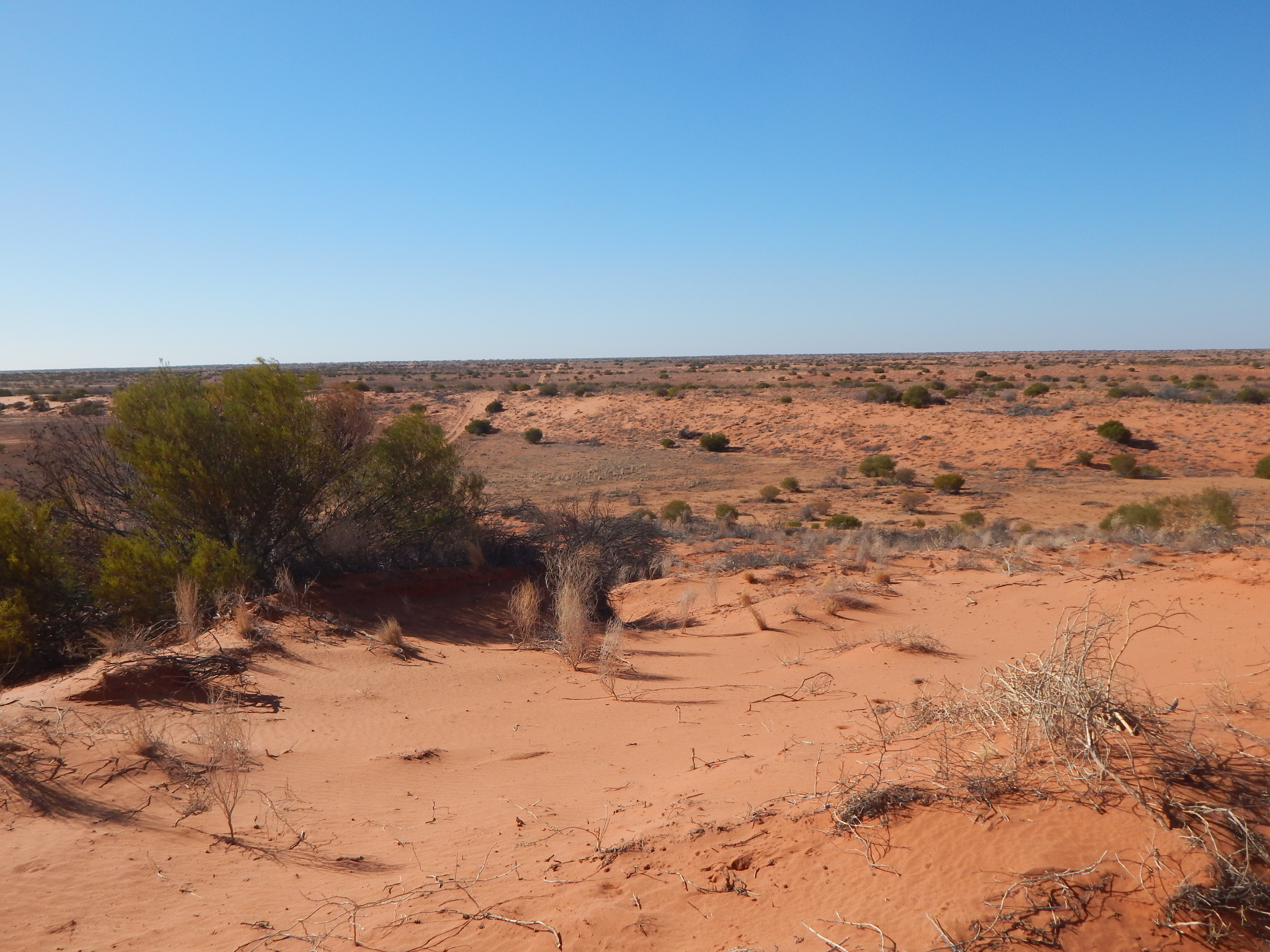
Strzelecki Desert in South Australia

The Strzelecki Desert was named in 1845 by explorer Charles Sturt after Polish explorer Paul Edmund Strzelecki.

The first European to cross the Great Sandy Desert was Peter Egerton Warburton. He arrived on the Western Australian coast badly exhausted and blind in one eye. He owed his survival to Charley, an Aboriginal tracker. The British explorer Ernest Giles, who crossed the desert in 1875, gave it the name Great Victoria Desert. It is dedicated to Queen Victoria. From 1858 onwards, the so-called "Afghan" cameleers and their beasts played an instrumental role in opening up the Outback and helping to build infrastructure.

The Sturt Stony Desert was named by Charles Sturt in 1844, while he was trying to find the inland sea which he believed lay at the centre of Australia. In 1866 Peter Egerton Warburton's expedition reached the Tirari desert from the west. The Overland Telegraph line was constructed in the 1870s along the route identified by Stuart. In 1865 the surveyor George Goyder, using changes in vegetation patterns, mapped a line in South Australia, north of which he considered rainfall to be too unreliable to support agriculture. British explorer Ernest Giles named the Gibson Desert in memory of Alfred Gibson, who went missing during an 1873–74 expedition.

The Tanami Desert was named by explorer and prospector Allan Davidson. He only assigned the name on his second expedition to this desert region, which ended in 1900. "Tanami" was the original Aboriginal name for two rock caves with clear drinking water.

The Simpson Desert got its name from Allen Simpson, a geographer who ventured into this desert in 1845. The name was suggested by explorer and geologist Cecil Madigan. In 1936, Edmund Colson became the first white man to cross the Simpson Desert. Before that, the great Australian explorers Charles Sturt and David Lindsay had failed. While the early explorers used horses to cross the Outback, the first woman to make the journey riding a horse was Anna Hingley, who rode from Broome to Cairns in 2006.

The nuclear weapons trials carried out by the United Kingdom at Maralinga and Emu Field in the 1950s and early 1960s have left areas contaminated with plutonium-239 and other radioactive material.

== Regions ==
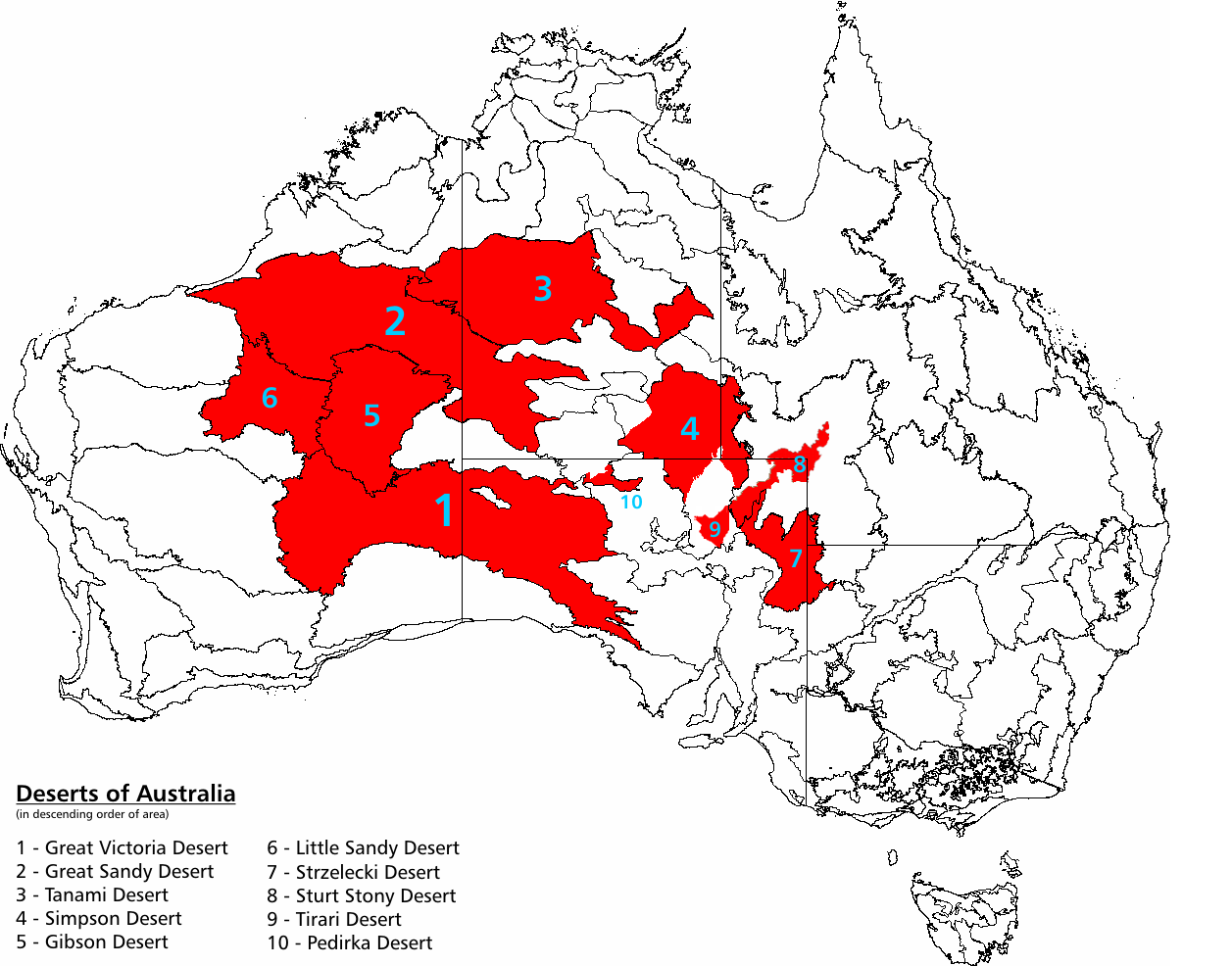
Deserts of Australia (in red), overlaid with internal boundaries and Interim Biogeographic Regionalisation for Australia biogeographic regions

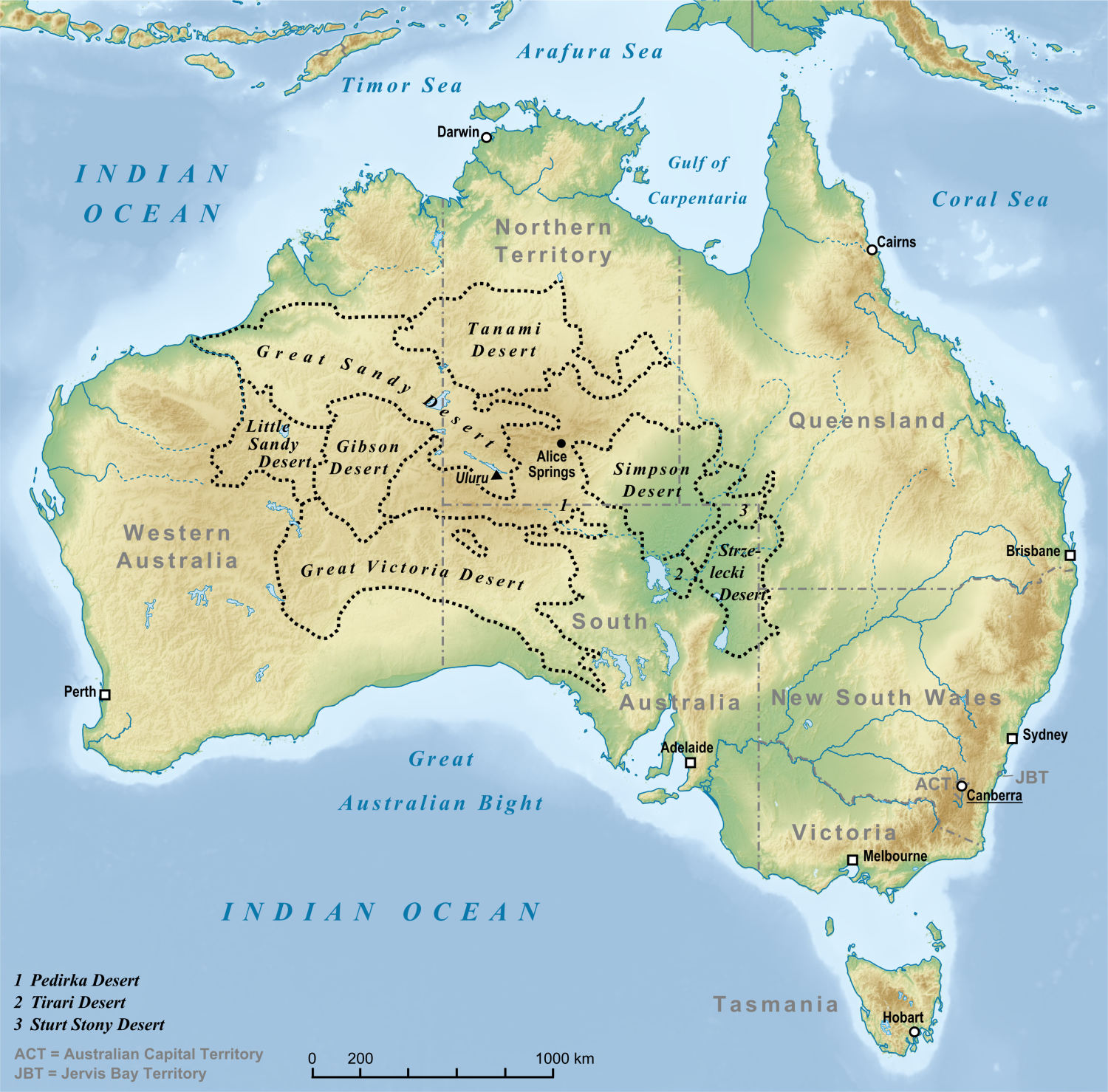
Undesignated areas surrounding the labeled desert regions are still predominantly arid.

A large contiguous desert area is formed by the Tanami, Great Sandy, Little Sandy, Gibson and Great Victoria Deserts in western Australia and a smaller one by the Simpson, Sturt, Strzelecki and Tirari Deserts in the east. Spatially isolated between the Great Victoria and Simpson Deserts lies the small Pedirka Desert, which spreads out over the geological Pedirka Sedimentary Basin. The Little Sandy Desert connects to the Great Sandy Desert and is similar in terms of landscape and vegetation. The Western Desert, which describes a cultural region of Australia's indigenous people, includes the Gibson, Great Victoria, Great Sandy and Little Sandy deserts in the states of Northern Territory, South Australia and Western Australia.

Most of the inhabitants of the area are Indigenous Australians. There are other areas in Australia designated as desert that are not related to the Australian deserts mentioned above. On Kangaroo Island off the coast of South Australia is an area of two square kilometres (0.77 sq mi) called the Little Sahara, a formation of several sand dunes on its south coast. In Victoria, about 375 km (235 mi) west of Melbourne, there is still the Little Desert National Park. The Painted Desert is 121 kilometres (75 mi) northwest of Coober Pedy in South Australia.

Desert	State/territory	Area (km^{2})	Area (miles^{2})	Area rank	% of Australia
Great Victoria Desert	South Australia; Western Australia	348,750 km^{2}	134,650 sq mi	1	4.5%
Great Sandy Desert	Northern Territory; Western Australia	267,250 km^{2}	103,190 sq mi	2	3.5%
Tanami Desert	Northern Territory; Western Australia	184,500 km^{2}	71,200 sq mi	3	2.4%
Simpson Desert	Northern Territory; Queensland; South Australia	176,500 km^{2}	68,100 sq mi	4	2.3%
Gibson Desert	Western Australia	156,000 km^{2}	60,000 sq mi	5	2.0%
Little Sandy Desert	Western Australia	111,500 km^{2}	43,100 sq mi	6	1.5%
Strzelecki Desert	New South Wales; Queensland; South Australia	80,250 km^{2}	30,980 sq mi	7	1.0%
Sturt Stony Desert	Queensland; South Australia	29,750 km^{2}	11,490 sq mi	8	0.3%
Tirari Desert	South Australia	15,250 km^{2}	5,890 sq mi	9	0.2%
Pedirka Desert	South Australia	1,250 km^{2}	480 sq mi	10	0.016%

== Geography ==
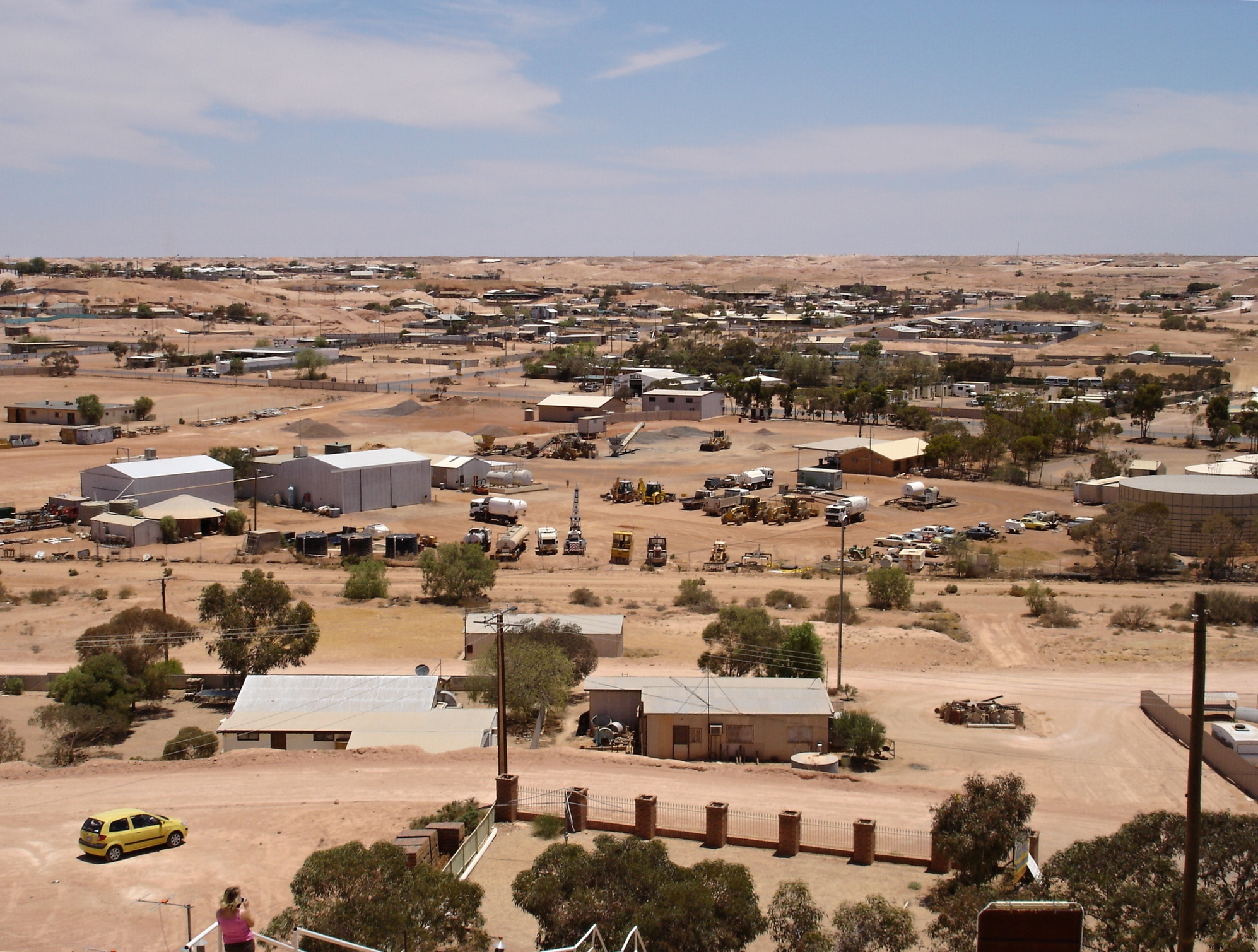
Generally flat lands of the Australian desert (Coober Pedy)

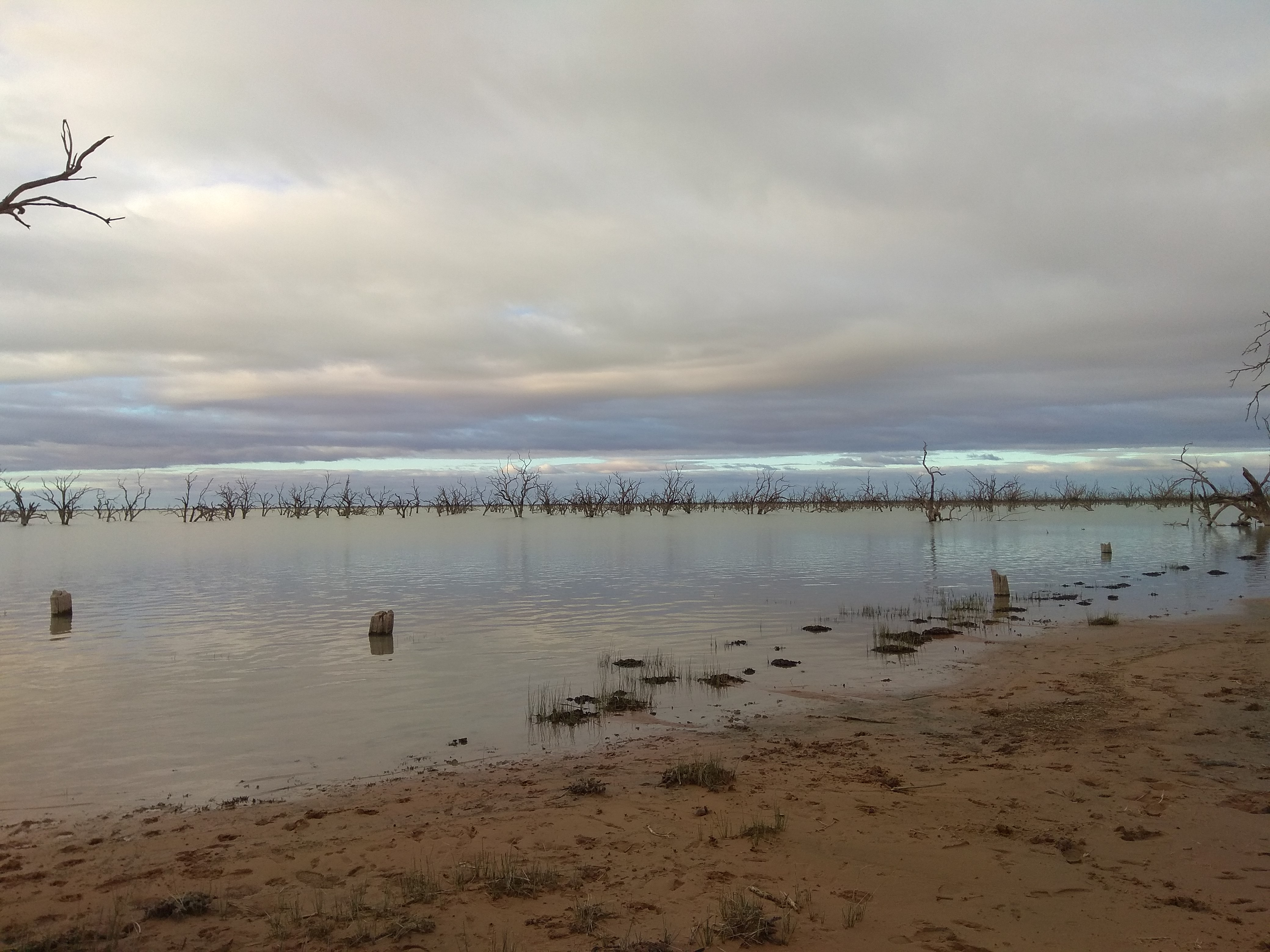
Menindee Lakes in NSW

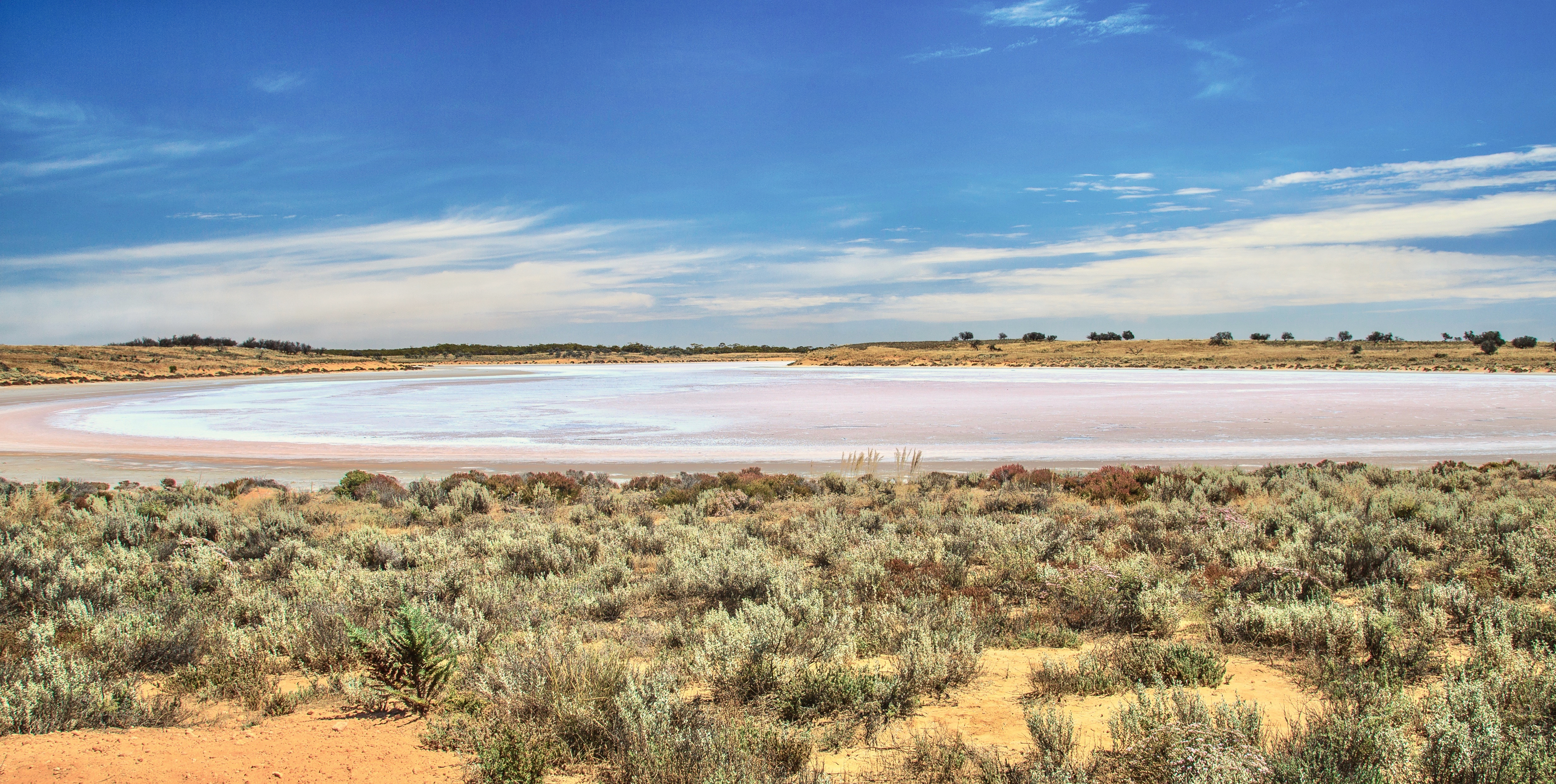
Lake Gairdner, South Australia

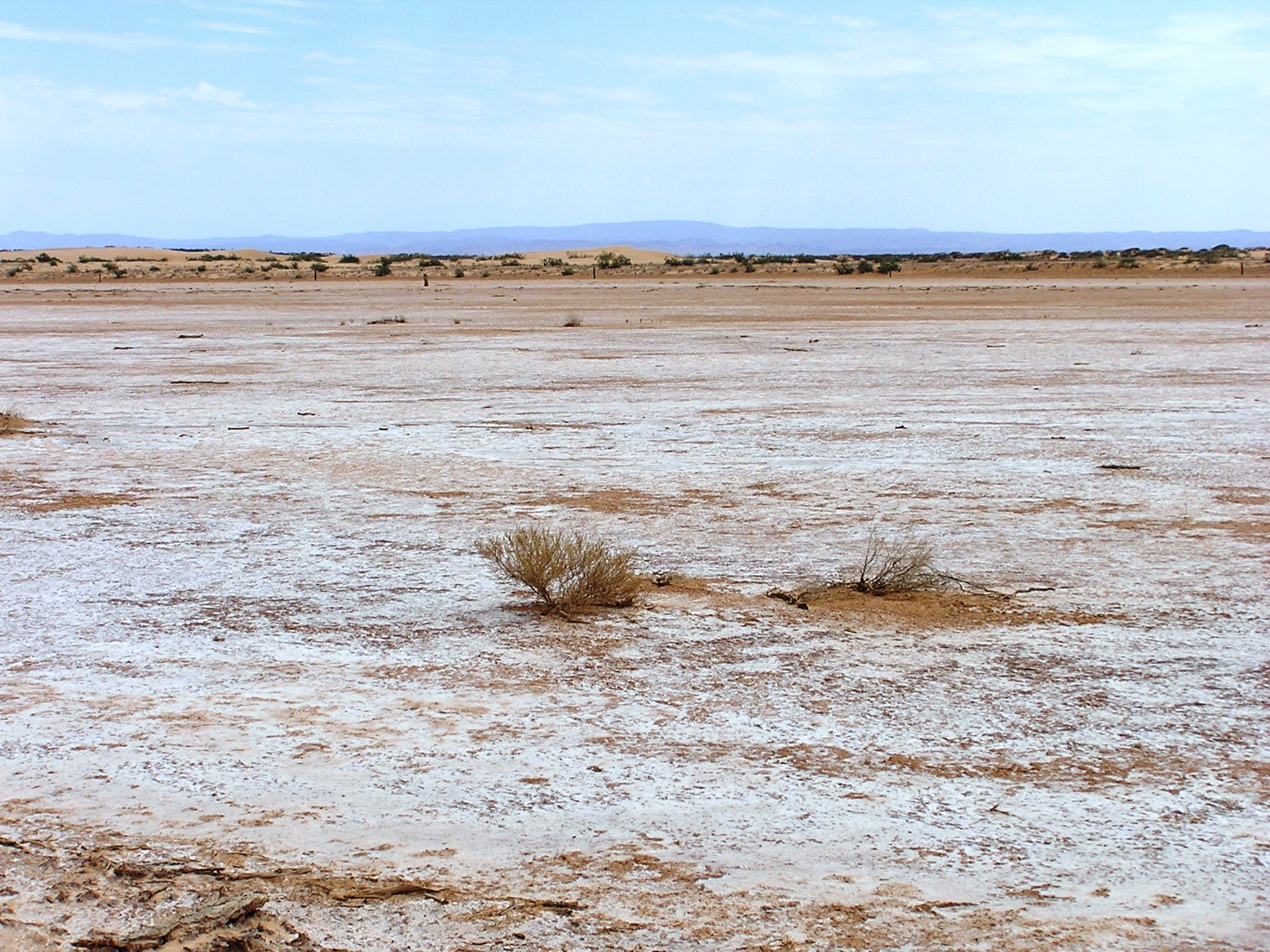
Lake Frome salt flats

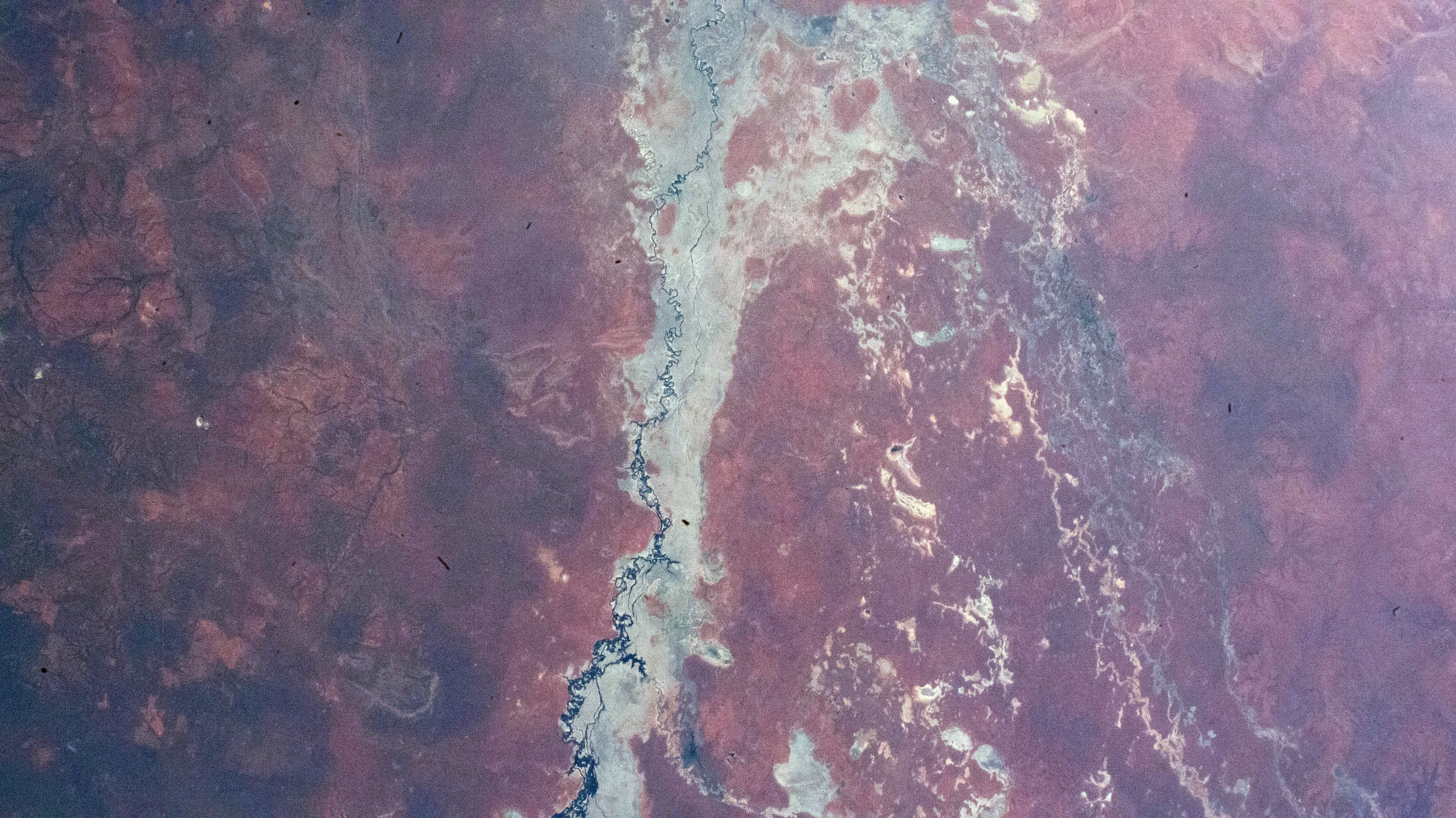
Darling River pictured from the International Space Station

There are four known types of terrestrial deserts:

- continental (or remote) deserts
- tropical (or zonal) deserts
- shelter deserts
- coastal deserts

Australian deserts generally meet the first three criteria, although some coastal desert areas exist in Western Australia. The great ocean circulation in the south of the continent and the cold sea currents in the southern zone play the fourth crucial role, indirectly at the origin of the long periods of continental drought by imposing high atmospheric pressures. As for the fifth hypothesis of cold or frozen deserts, as absurd as this assertion may appear in present-day Australia, they existed several million years ago. Geomorphologists thus explain a number of spectacular rock formations, from the Mount Olga or Uluru to the over-deepened wave of the wind rocks, by involving a thaw of (peri)glacial formations followed by wind action over a long period. The sand ridges have a trend of SSE-NNW and continue parallel for great distances.

Areas of the formerly desert outback, deserts such as the Simpson Desert from west to east or mountainous regions such as the Arckaringa Hills are characterized by ocean landscapes of charred rocks, called gibbers. As noted by early Australian explorers such as Ernest Giles large portions of the desert are characterized by gravel-covered terrains covered in thin desert grasses and it also contains extensive areas of undulating red sand plains and dunefields, low rocky/gravelly ridges and substantial upland portions with a high degree of laterite formation. The sandy soil of the lateritic buckshot plains is rich in iron in the Gibson Desert. Several isolated salt-water lakes occur in the centre of the region and to the southwest a system of small lakes follow paleo-drainage features. The desert proper is uninhabitable and the environment remains unmarred, while the greener fringe is used for sheep grazing.

=== Waterbodies ===
Lakes in the regions (most of which are dried-up saline lakes), include:

- Willandra Lakes Region
- Menindee Lakes
- Lake Mungo
- Peery Lake
- Lake Amadeus
- Lake Mackay
- Lake Neale
- Numby Numby
- Lake Sylvester
- Tarrabool Lake
- Lake Woods
- Lake Yamma Yamma
- Lake Bumbunga
- Lake Dey Dey
- Lake Dutton
- Kati Thanda–Lake Eyre
- Lake Frome
- Lake Gairdner
- Lake Gilles
- Goyder Lagoon
- Lake Gregory
- Lake Hope
- Sleaford Mere
- Lake Torrens
- Serpentine Lakes
- Lake Maitland
- Lake Carnegie
- Lake Way
- Lake Macleod
- Lake Anneen
- Lake Barlee
- Lake Breaden
- Lake Burnside
- Lake Carey
- Lake Dora
- Dumbleyung Lake
- Lake Nabberu
- Serpentine Lakes
- Kumpupintil Lake
- Lake Ballard
- Lake Lefroy
- Lake Gregory

Rivers and creeks, which are sparse and generally ephemeral, in the Australian desert include:

- Darling River
- Alberga River
- Finke River
- Georgina River
- Hale River
- Alligator Rivers
- Mary River
- Todd River
- Diamantina River
- Gawler River
- Macumba River
- Warburton River
- Fitzroy River
- Leichhardt River

== Biodiversity ==
=== Vegetation ===
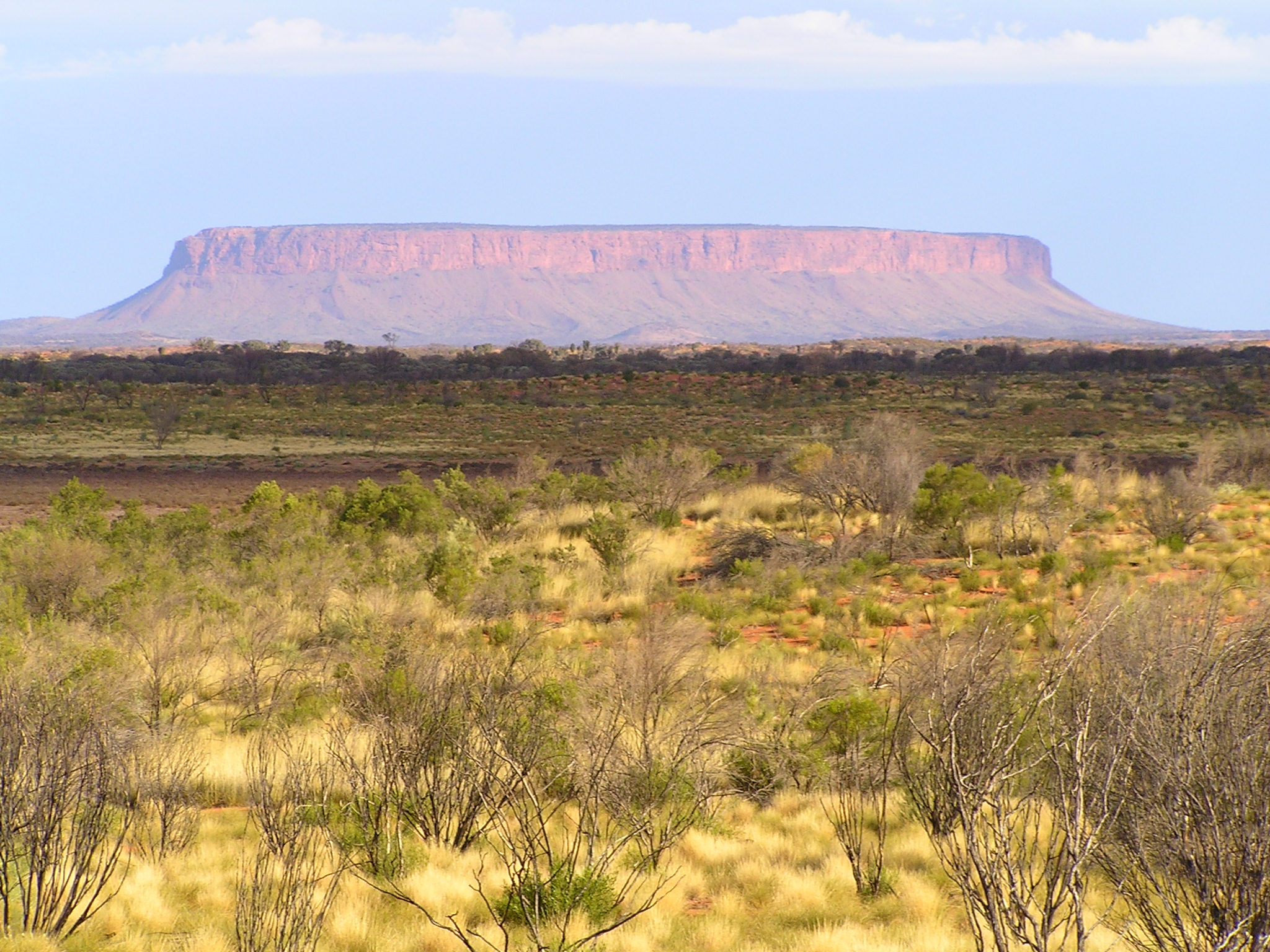
A view of Mount Conner with typical tussock vegetation in the foreground

Two types of semi-desert, referred to as "grassland" in Australia, occur in the Australian deserts: tussock or Mitchell grasslands are found in the desert areas of the Northern Territory, South Australia and western Queensland. The annual precipitation that falls on these marl and alluvial soils covered with grasses of the Astrebla genus ranges from 150 to 500 mm (6 to 19.5 in). Trees cannot take root on the heavy clay soils, and they are riddled with bushfires. Spinifex or hummock semi-desert grows spiny- headed grasses (Spinifex) in clumps, next to free areas as green Triodia pungens and blue-grey Triodia basedowii. Zygochloa dominates on the sand dunes of the Simpson, Strzelecki and Tirari Deserts. In large areas of desert, semi-desert grasslands with mulga bushes (Acacia aneura) predominate.

Semi-desert savannas with low-growing acacia species cover large areas in the south of the arid zone, where 200 to 500 mm of precipitation falls in winter and summer. The acacia species, called mulga, grow on the plains, mountain slopes and hills of the deserts. In connection with the bushfires, which are mainly ignited by the spinifex grasses, the non-resistant mulga bushes burn, which then no longer grow back. There is evidence that Aboriginal people did not start bushfires in mulga landscapes. The desert areas covered by mulga are also threatened by deforestation, extensive livestock farming and fuel wood production. At the eastern end of the arid zone is the so-called witchetty bush. This area is home to the endemic species of acacia, Acacia kempeana, which feeds the wood borer larva, the witchetty maggot, up to three inches in size. It is high in protein and was an important part of the Aboriginal diet.

Eucalyptus woodland thrives along the dry riverbeds. Grasses grow on the soil under the eucalypts. Chenopodiaceae shrubs, which usually do not exceed 1.5 m (5 ft) in height, are found in the southern desert areas. They are salt plants that grow on both dry and saline soils. In the deserts there are permanent or percolating patches of freshwater formed in rocky areas or in sandstone canyons. Bluebush and saltbush species grow in heavier soils. Between the sand ridges, the areas of wooded steppe consist of Eucalyptus gongylocarpa, Eucalyptus youngiana, and Acacia aneura (mulga) shrubs scattered over areas of resilient spinifex grasses, particularly Triodia basedowii. Most of the area is covered by hummock grasslands (Triodia spp.), with a few eucalypts, acacias, grevilleas, and bloodwoods (Corymbia chippendalei and Corymbia opaca) are found on sand hills. The vegetation of the dunefields of the Tirari Desert is dominated by either sandhill wattle (Acacia ligulata) or sandhill cane-grass (Zygochloa paradoxa), which occur on the crests and slopes of dunes. Tall, open shrubland also occurs on the slopes.

In drier areas, species including old man saltbush (Atriplex nummularia), cottonbush (Maireana aphylla) and Queensland bluebush (Chenopodium auricomum) form a sparse, open shrubland, whereas swamps and depressions are frequently associated with swamp cane-grass (Eragrostis australasica) and lignum (Muehlenbeckia florulenta). The intermittent watercourses and permanent waterholes associated with tributaries of Cooper Creek support woodland dominated by river red gum (Eucalyptus camaldulensis) and coolibah (Eucalyptus coolabah). Numerous salt lakes form after heavy rainfall and at times fill the underlying salt flats. The salt lakes occupy relatively small areas in the desert areas. For example, a major salt lake is Lake Eyre, which spans areas of the Gibson and Tirari Deserts and fills up completely and then dries up about once every 25 years. Seventeen headwaters have formed in the deserts as a result of the subsurface Great Artesian Basin, one of the largest freshwater basins in the world. The water coming out of the springs is rich in minerals. The springs partially form the habitat of endemic fish and the spring area is overgrown with rare plants. Numerous springs have dried up due to extensive agricultural use in the last 100 years. Threats to biodiversity include wildfires, feral animals, weeds, and uncontrolled grazing.

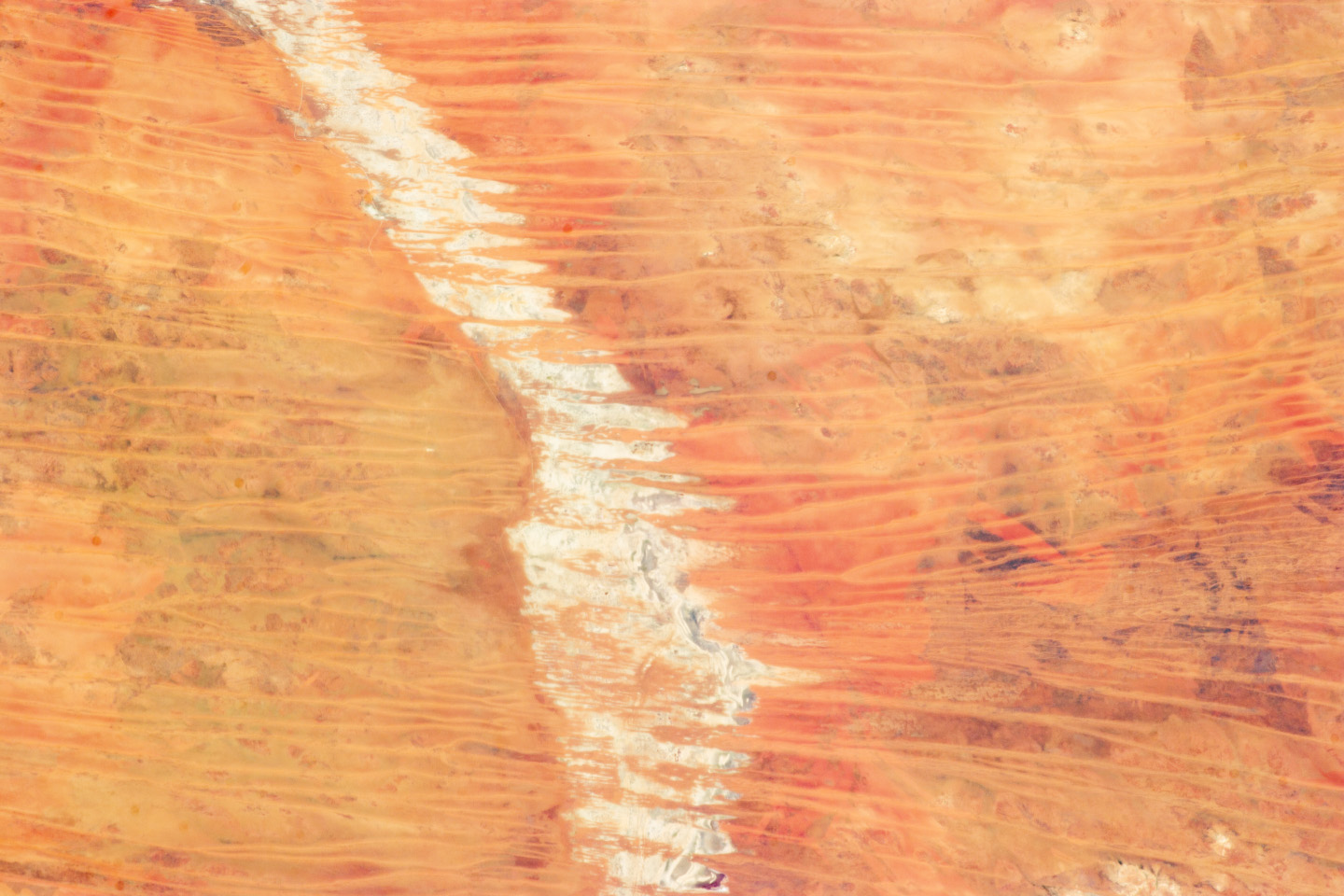
Great Sandy Desert from space

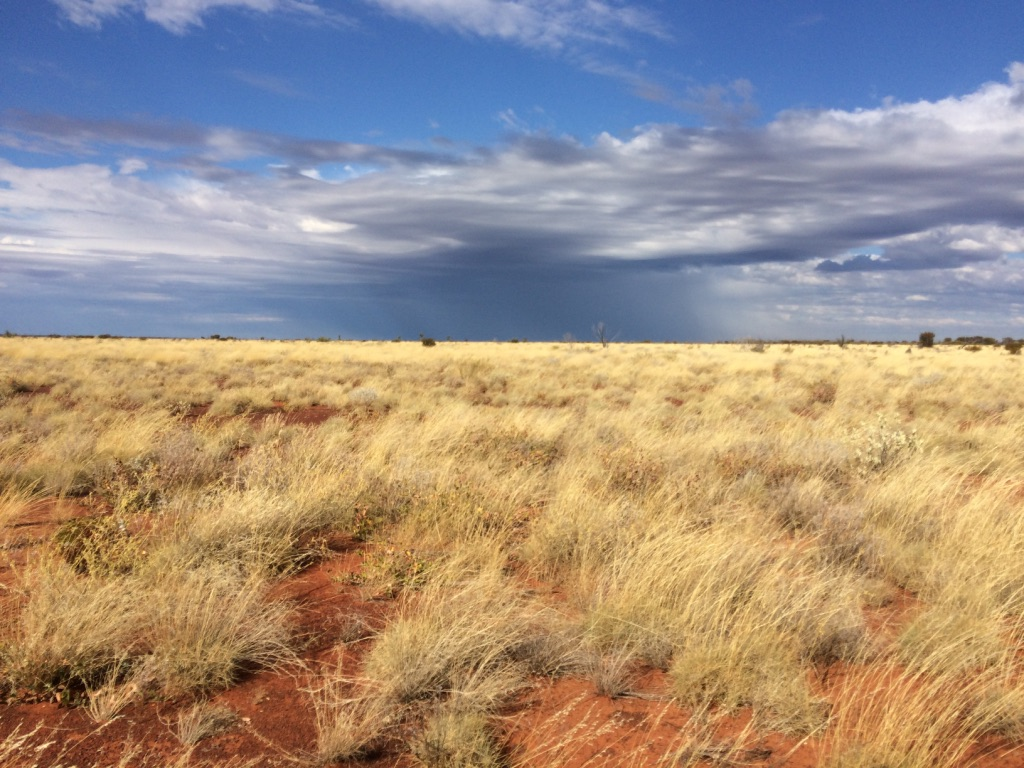
Tussock grass in Gibson Desert

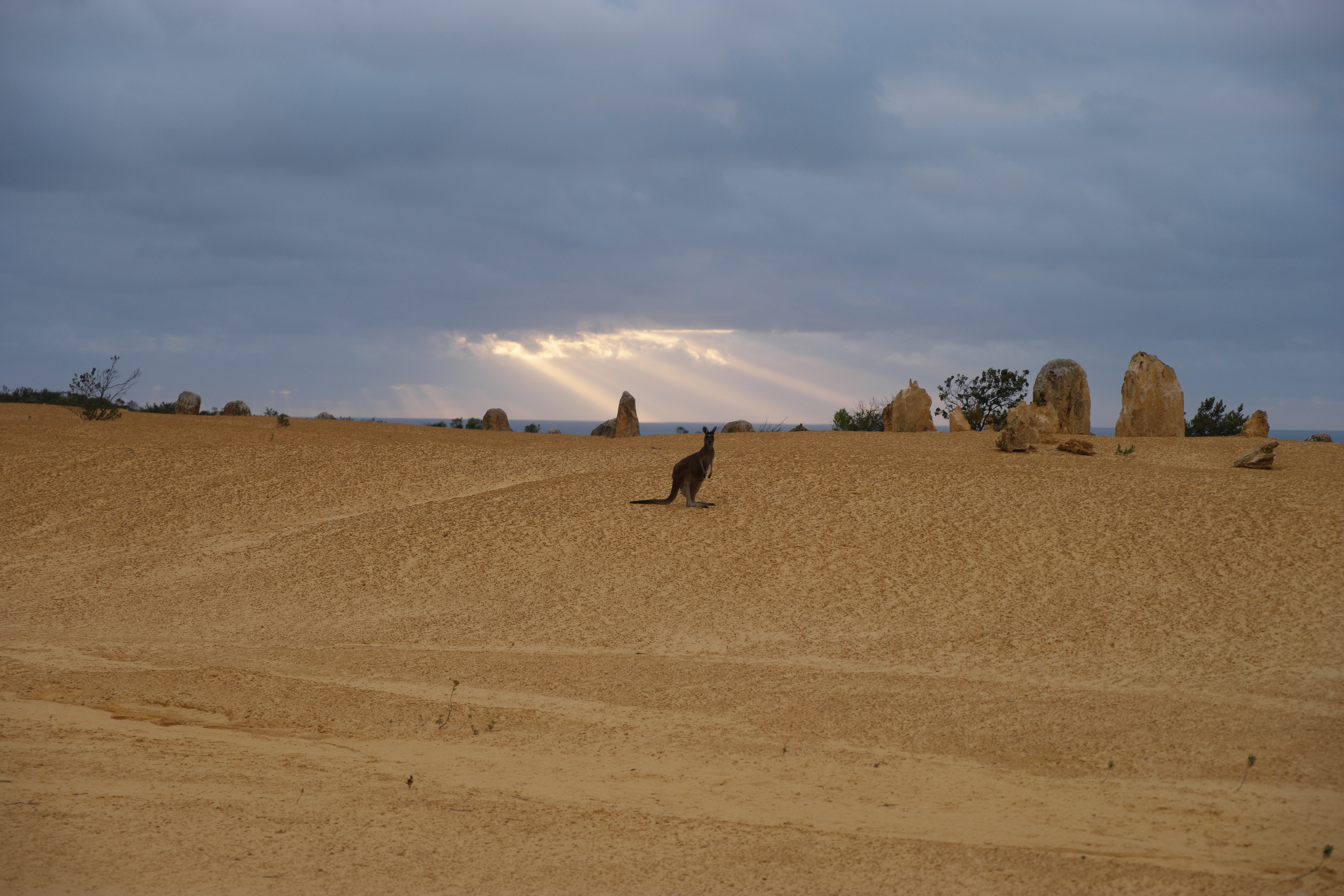
Kangaroo in Nambung National Park

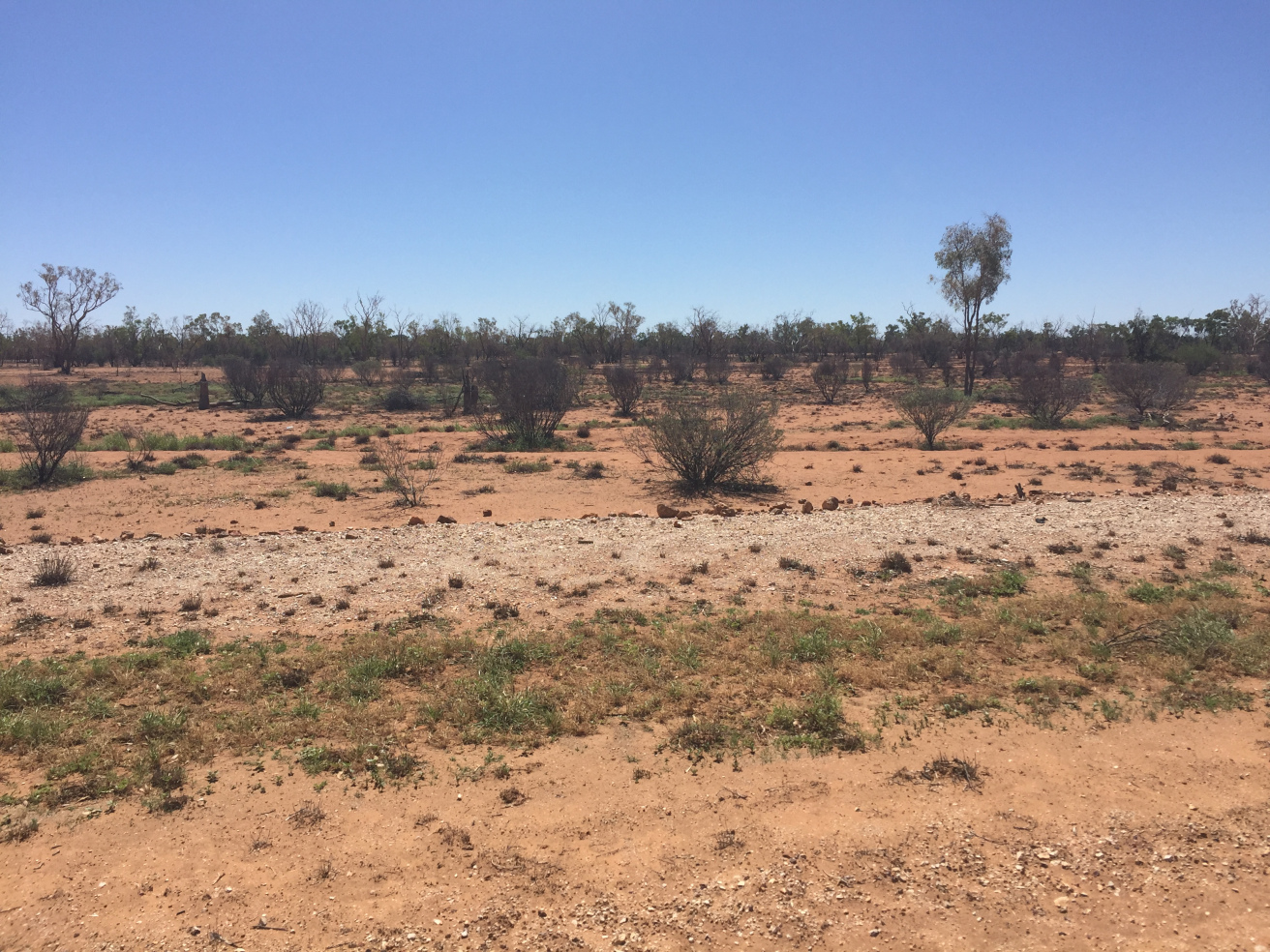
Simpson Desert near Bedourie

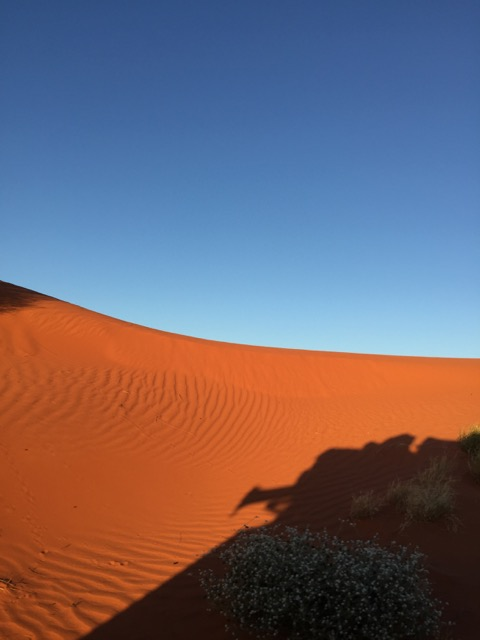
Red dune in Simpson Desert

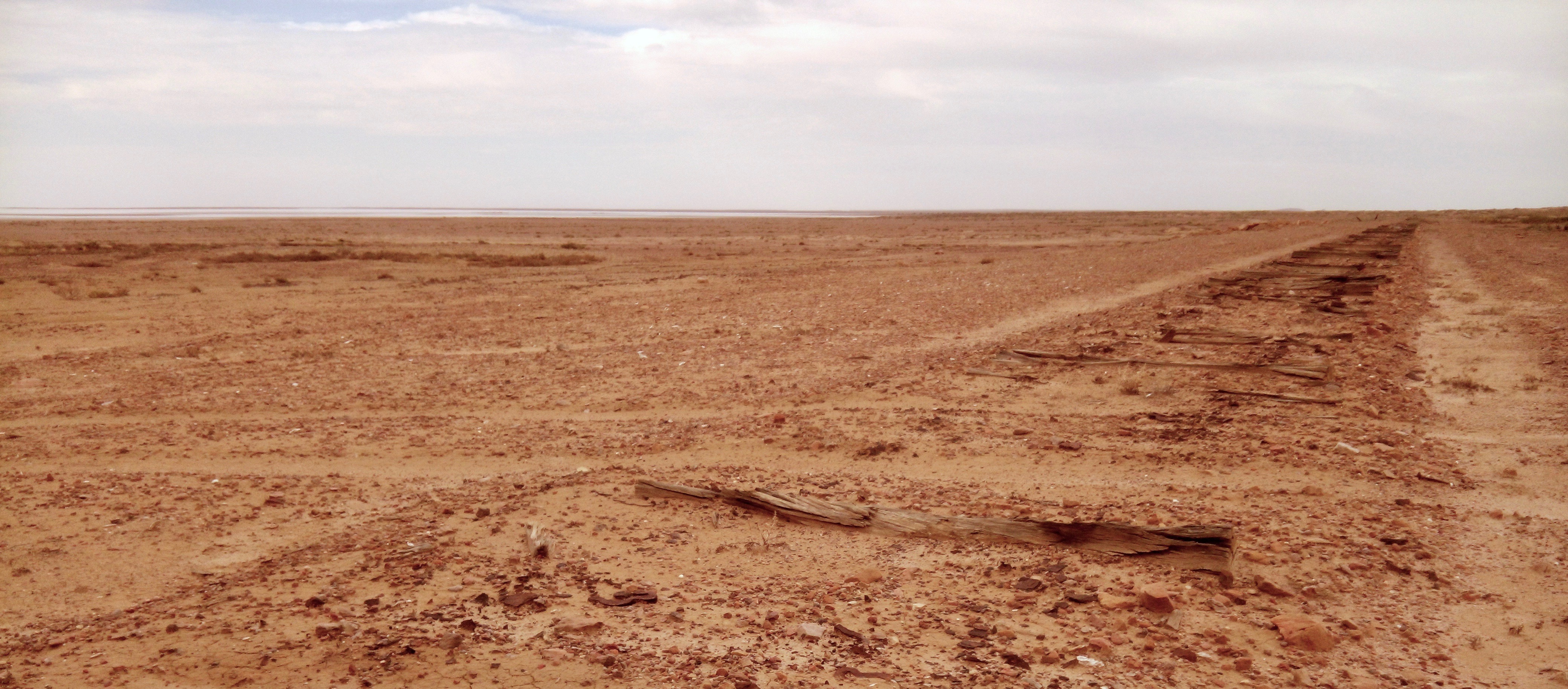
Dismantled railway line near Lake Eyre South, South Australia

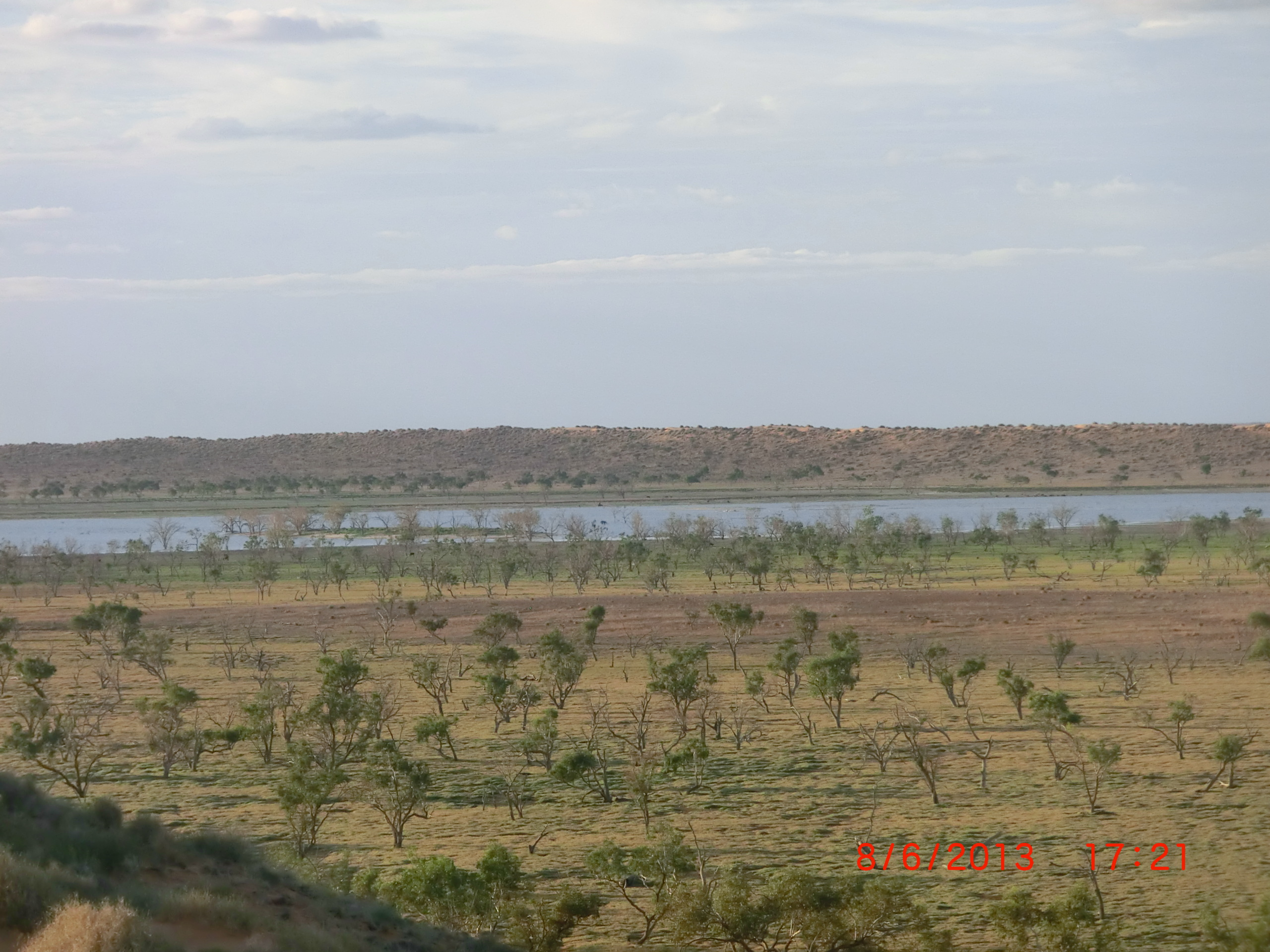
Desert savannah near Birdsville, Queensland

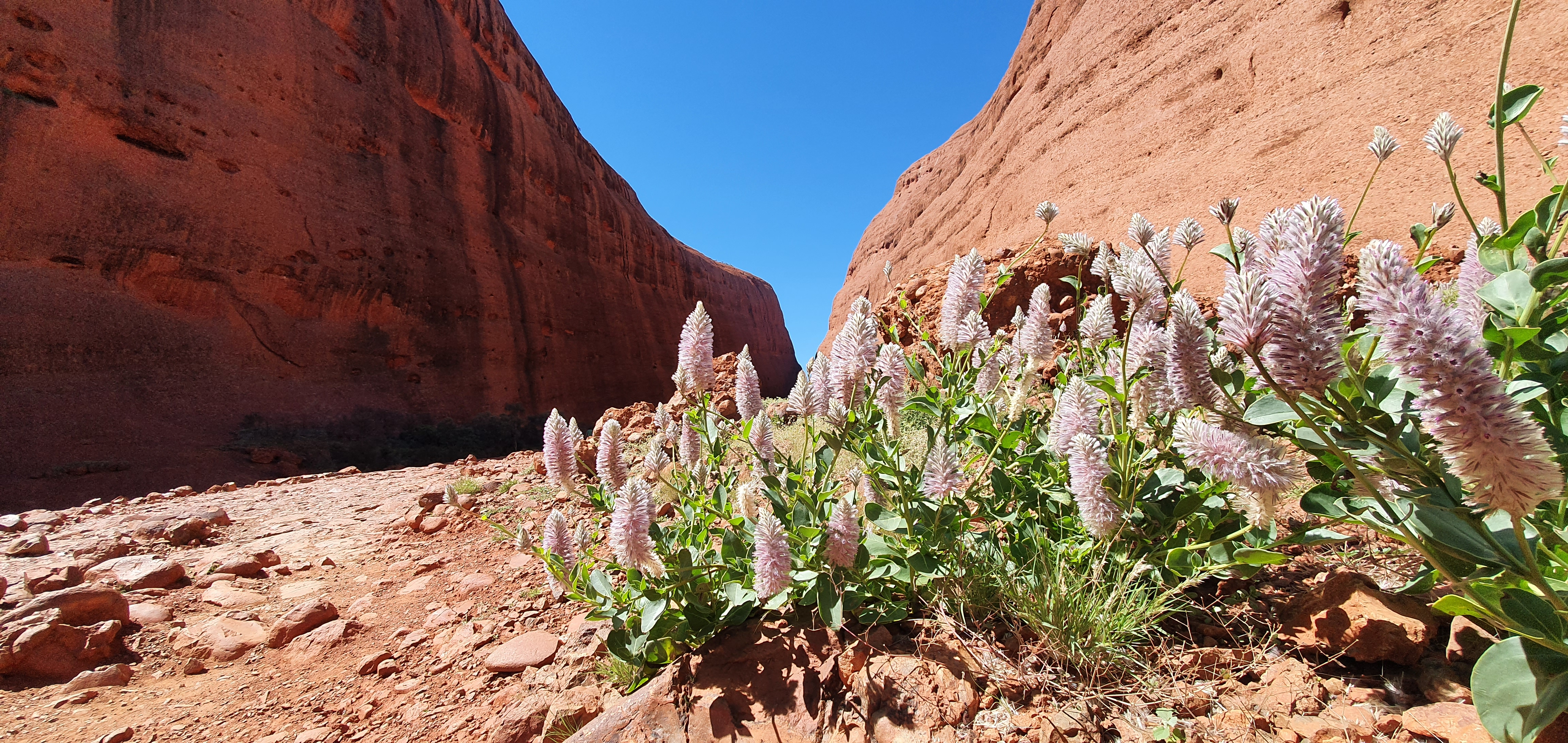
Desert flowers near Uluru

=== Wildlife ===
Significantly fewer animals live in the Australian deserts than in the Australian coastal regions. The most common creatures in Australia's arid regions are insects, such as termites and ants, which are of great importance to the ecology. Animals in the desert include feral camels, dingoes, goannas (including the large perentie) and numerous species of lizards and birds. Mammals include bilbies, mulgara, common brushtail possum, rufous hare-wallaby, burrowing bettong, the black-flanked rock-wallaby, marsupial moles, rufous hare-wallabies, yellow-footed rock wallaby, western grey kangaroos, and red kangaroos. Some of the bird-life found within the desert include the rare Alexandra's parrot, wedge-tailed eagles, Australian bustard, the mulga parrot, the scarlet-chested parrot and the chestnut-breasted whiteface (Aphelocephala pectoralis) found on the eastern edge of the Great Victoria Desert and the malleefowl of Mamungari Conservation Park.

About 103 species of mammals lived there at the time of European colonization, of which 19 are extinct, such as the desert bandicoot (Perameles eremiana), the numbat (Myrmecobius fasciatus) and the long-tailed bouncy mouse (Notomys longicaudatus). The main survivors are small rodents, insectivorous bats, marsupials, kangaroos and wallabies. A major threat to vegetation are the free-roaming camels in the desert. Over 300 species of birds live in the desert areas, including emus, ratites, parrots, cockatoos, owls and raptors. The desert includes many types of lizards, including the vulnerable great desert skink (Egernia kintorei), the Central Ranges taipan (discovered in 2007), and a number of small marsupials, including the endangered sandhill dunnart (Sminthopsis psammophila) and the crest-tailed mulgara (Dasycercus cristicauda). One way to survive here is to burrow into the sands, as a number of the desert's animals, including the southern marsupial mole (Notoryctes typhlops), and the water-holding frog do.

Reptiles live in large numbers in the deserts, for example the woma python, thorny devil, bearded dragon, monitor lizard, frilled dragon and geckos. Frog species that have adapted to drought, such as the desert trilling frog (Neobatrachus centralis) and the desert tree frog (Litoria rubella), can also occur. The most numerous species of lizards in the world can be found in the Australian desert, there are over 40 species of them there. In addition to fish, the few permanent freshwater holes are also home to mussels, crustaceans and insects. 34 species of fish occur in Lake Eyre and others at the artesian springs (e.g. at Dalhousie Springs in South Australia). Over 40 species of frogs have been observed after heavy rains.

The Dingo Fence was built to restrict movements of dingoes and wild dogs into agricultural areas towards the south east of the continent. Predators of the desert include the dingo (as the desert is north of the Dingo Fence) and two large monitor lizards, the perentie (Varanus giganteus) and the sand goanna (Varanus gouldii). Many introduced species have affected the fauna and flora of Australia's desert regions. The Australian feral camel affects native vegetation, partly because Australian desert vegetation evolved without any major herbivores present. Uncontrolled access to more sensitive areas by four-wheel-drive vehicles is also an issue. Feral cats have reduced the populations of bilbies and mulgara.

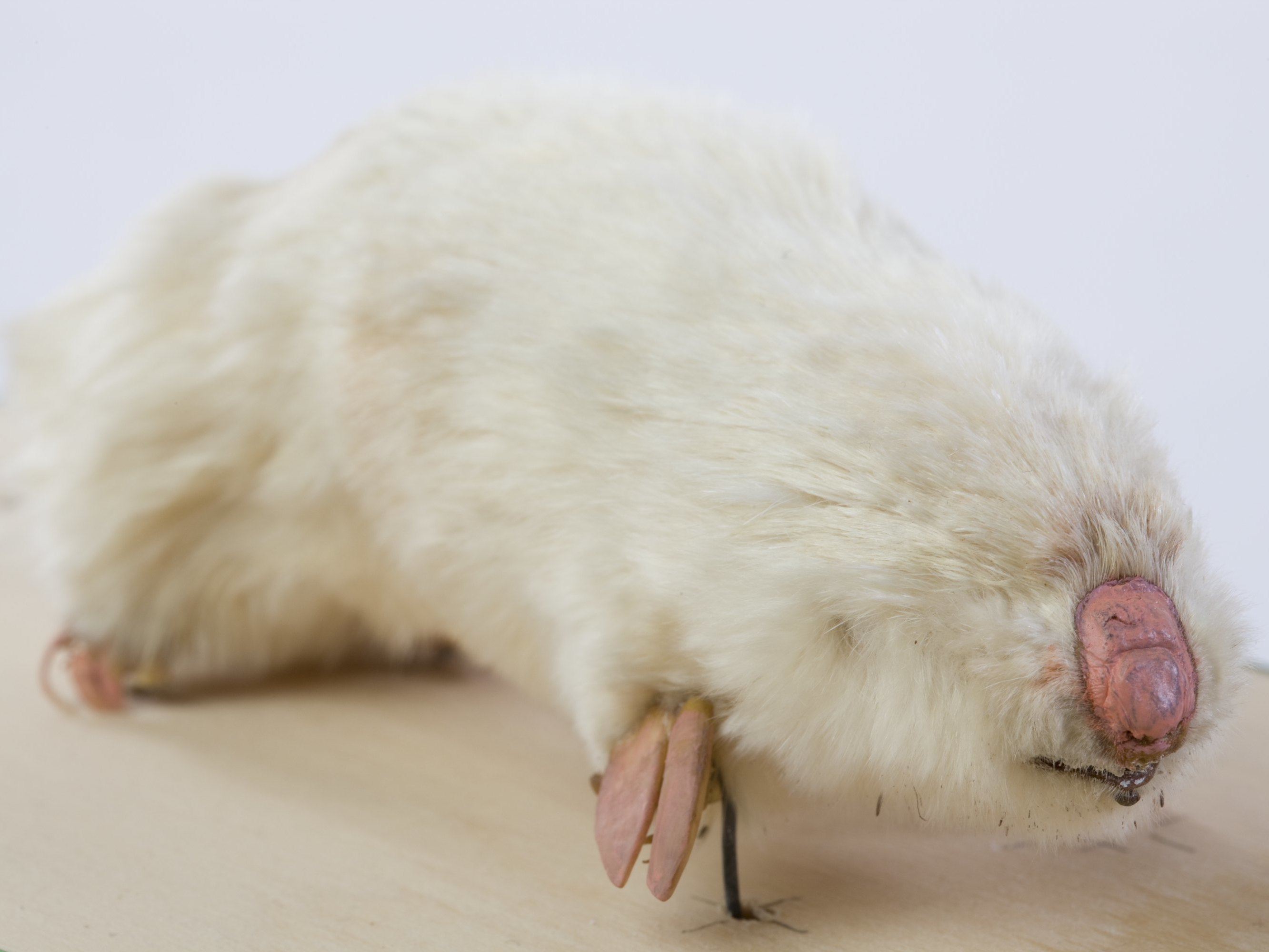
The marsupial mole prefers an underground life

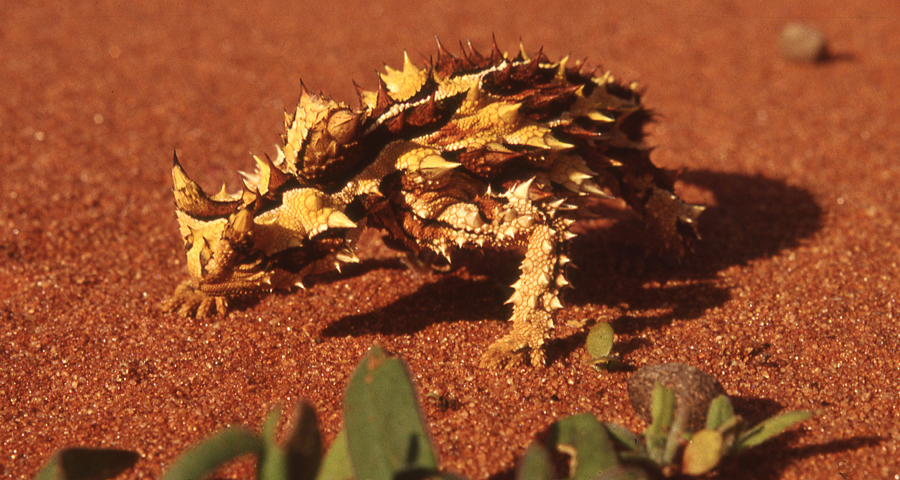
A thorny devil in the Northern Territory

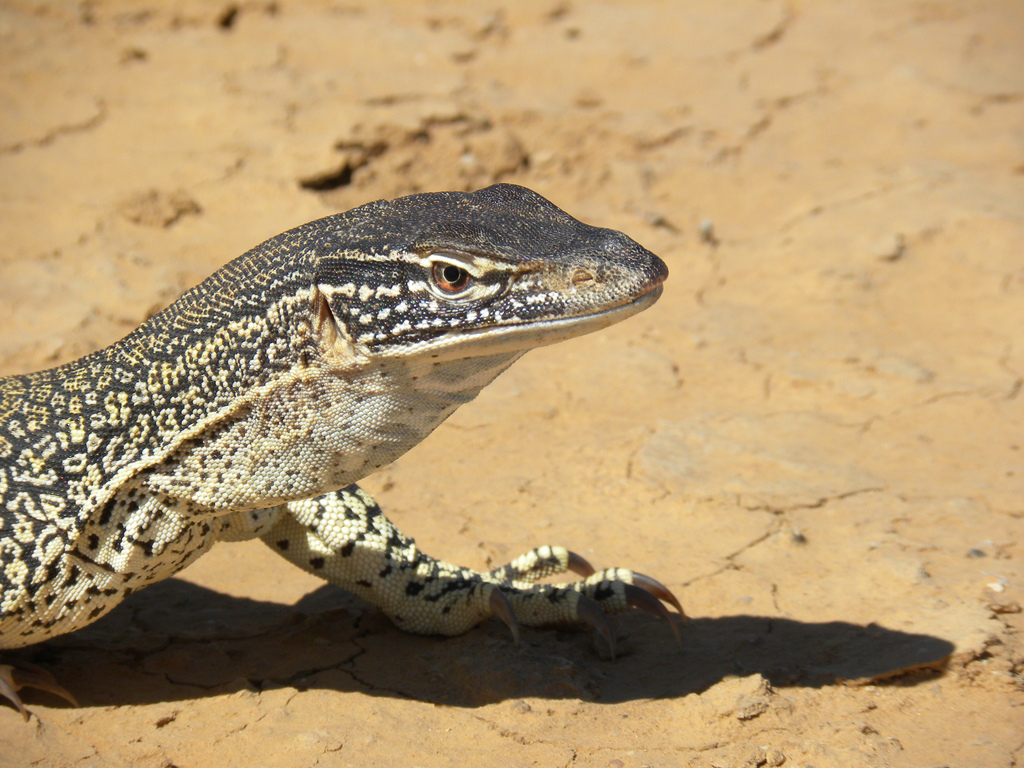
The Gould's monitor lizard is a large species of lizard found in the Australian desert

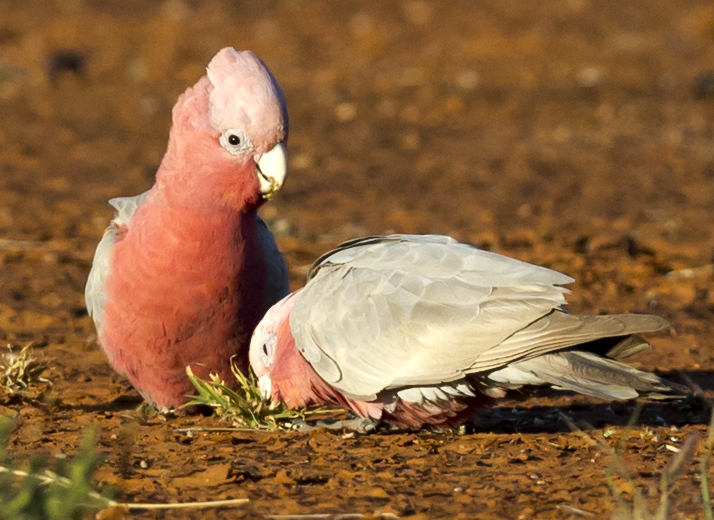
The galah lives in tree-covered savannas and open grasslands

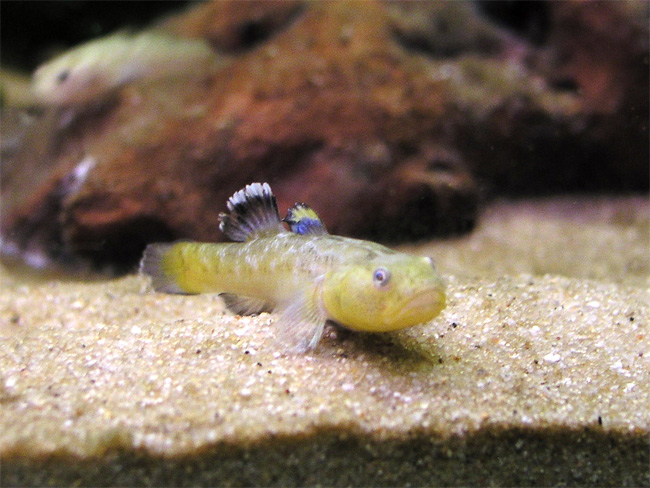
Desert goby

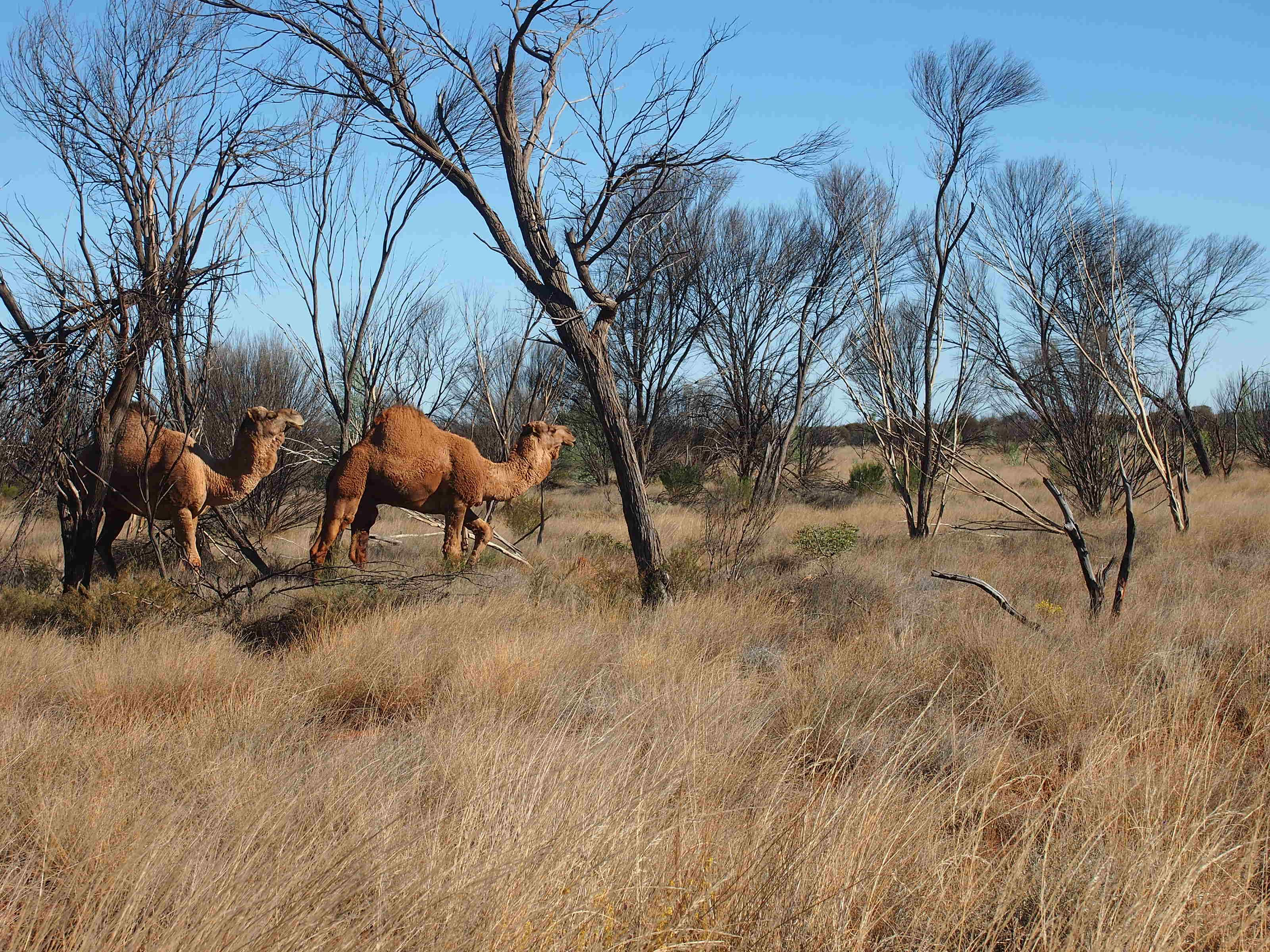
Feral camels in Central Australia

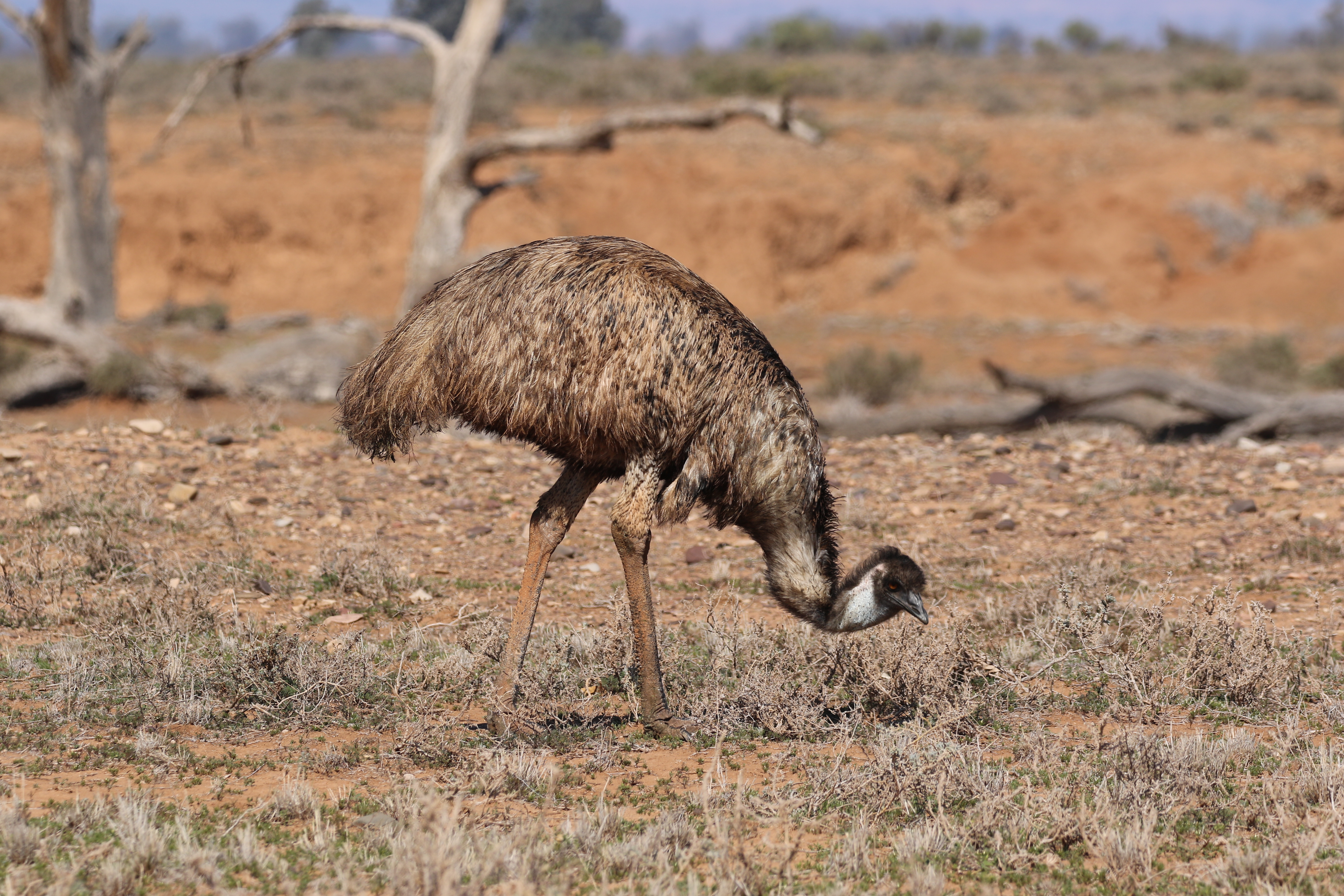
Emu in South Australia

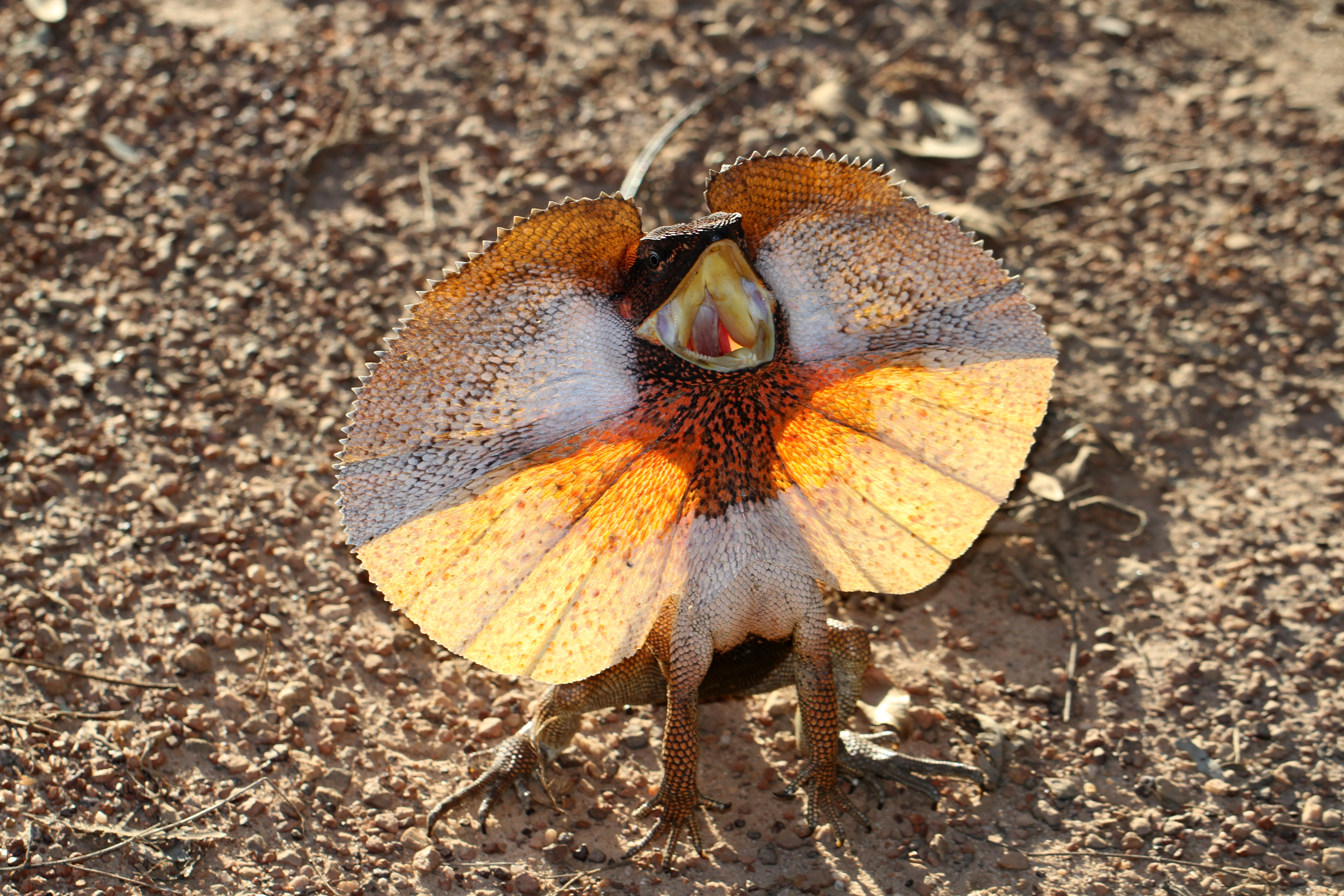
Frilled-neck lizard

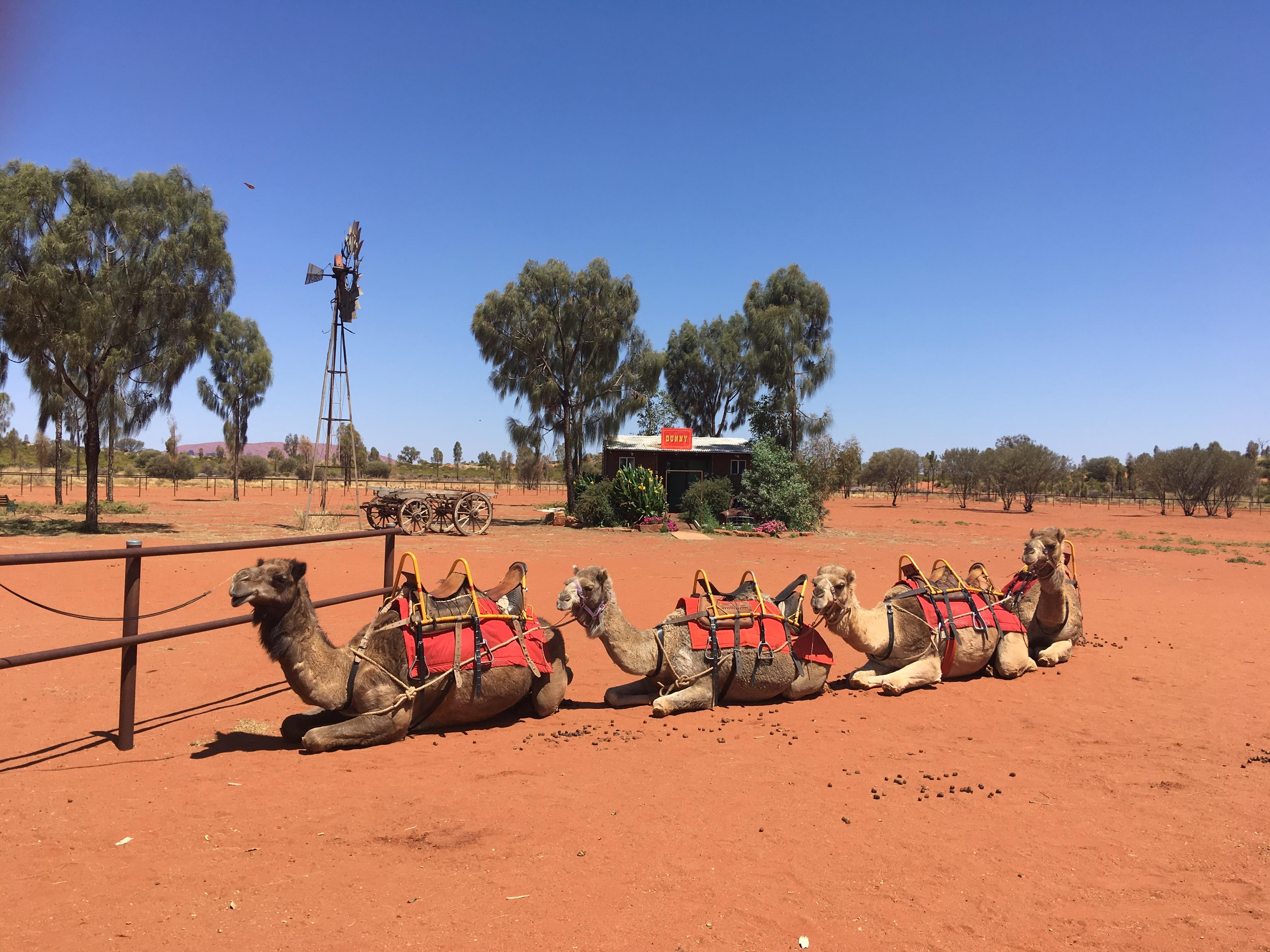
Camel farm in Uluru

== Climate ==
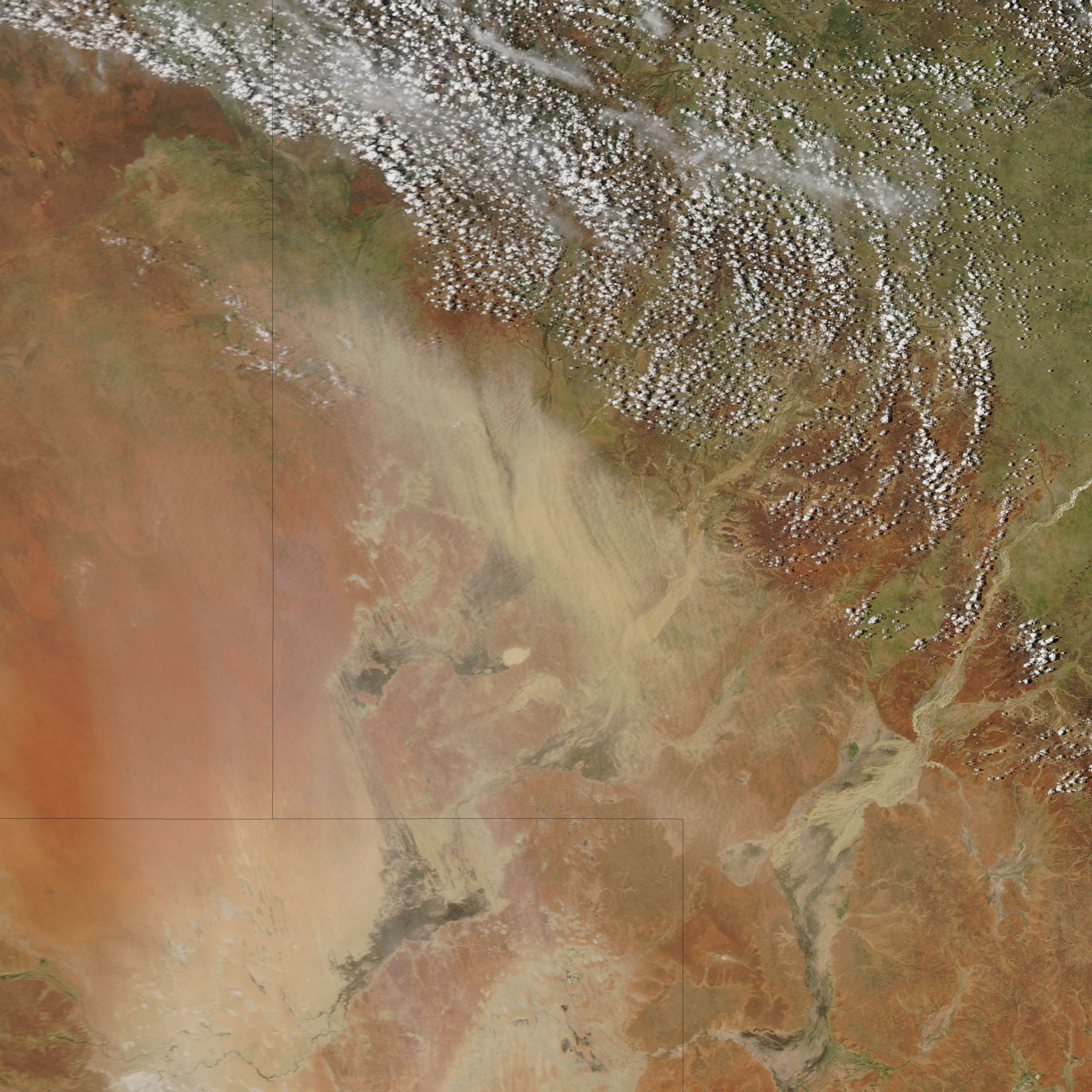
Dust storm (haboob) over southwestern Queensland in 2010

Australia's climate is mostly determined by the hot, sinking air of the subtropical high-pressure belt (i.e. Australian High). Dry conditions are associated with an El Niño–Southern Oscillation in Australia. Vegetation in arid areas is primarily dependent upon soil type.

The average annual rainfall in the Australian desert ranges from 81 to 250 mm (3.2 to 9.8 in). Areas with precipitation greater than 200 mm (7.9 in) qualify for a semi-arid climate, but a massive evaporation rate makes up for the higher than normal desert rainfall. Central Australia is arid, with the driest areas averaging 150 mm (5.91 in) of rainfall each year. Thunderstorms are relatively common in the region, with an annual average of 15 to 20 thunderstorms. Summer daytime temperatures range from 32 to 50 °C (90 to 122 °F); winter maximum temperatures average between 18 and 23 °C (64 and 73 °F), though are warmer in the north.

Extensive areas are covered by longitudinal dunes. The northwestern region of the desert is one which gives rise to the heat lows which help drive the NW monsoon. There, almost all rain comes from monsoon thunderstorms or the occasional tropical cyclone rain depression. Frost does not occur in most of the area in the far north. The regions bordering the Gibson Desert in the far southeast may record a light frost or two every year, with frost being more prevalent in the Tanami region. Away from the coast winter nights can still be chilly in comparison to the warm days. Minimum winter temperatures dip to 6 °C (43 °F) in most parts of the desert.

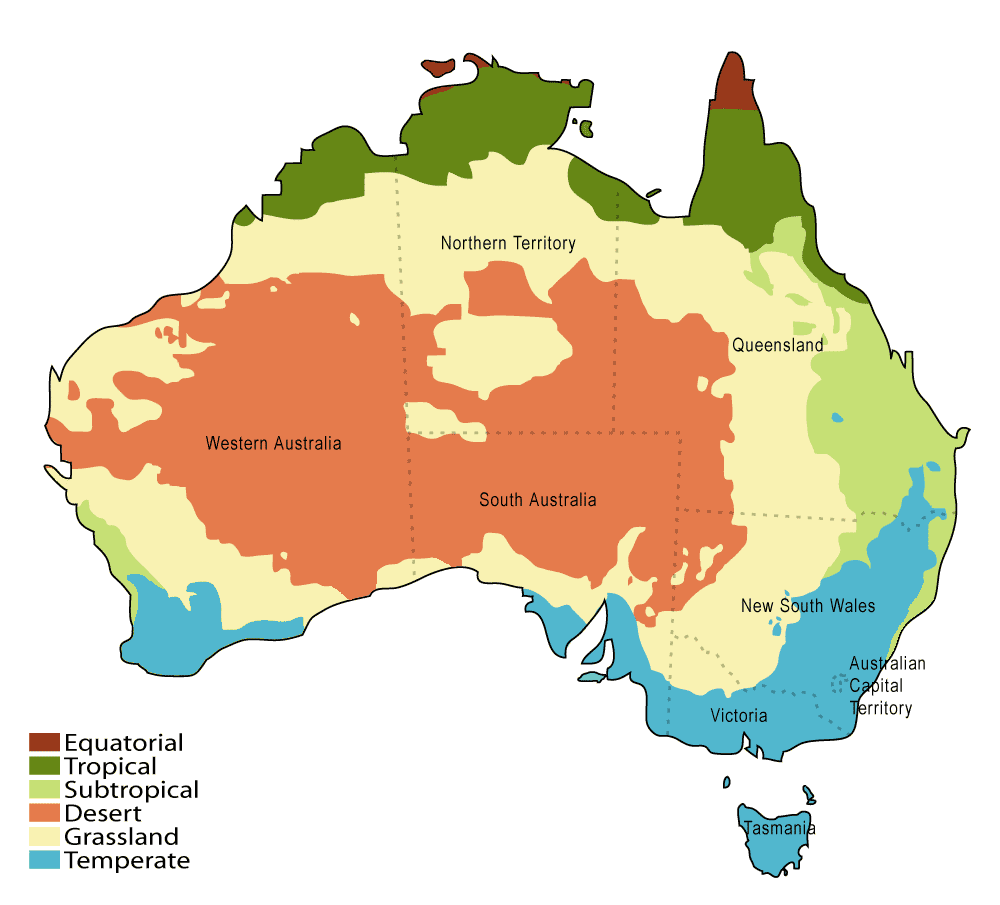
Climate zones in Australia with deserts in orange and semi-deserts in yellow

Annual rain days in the desert range from less than 20 to no more than 80 days (on the 0.2 mm threshold)

== Tourism ==
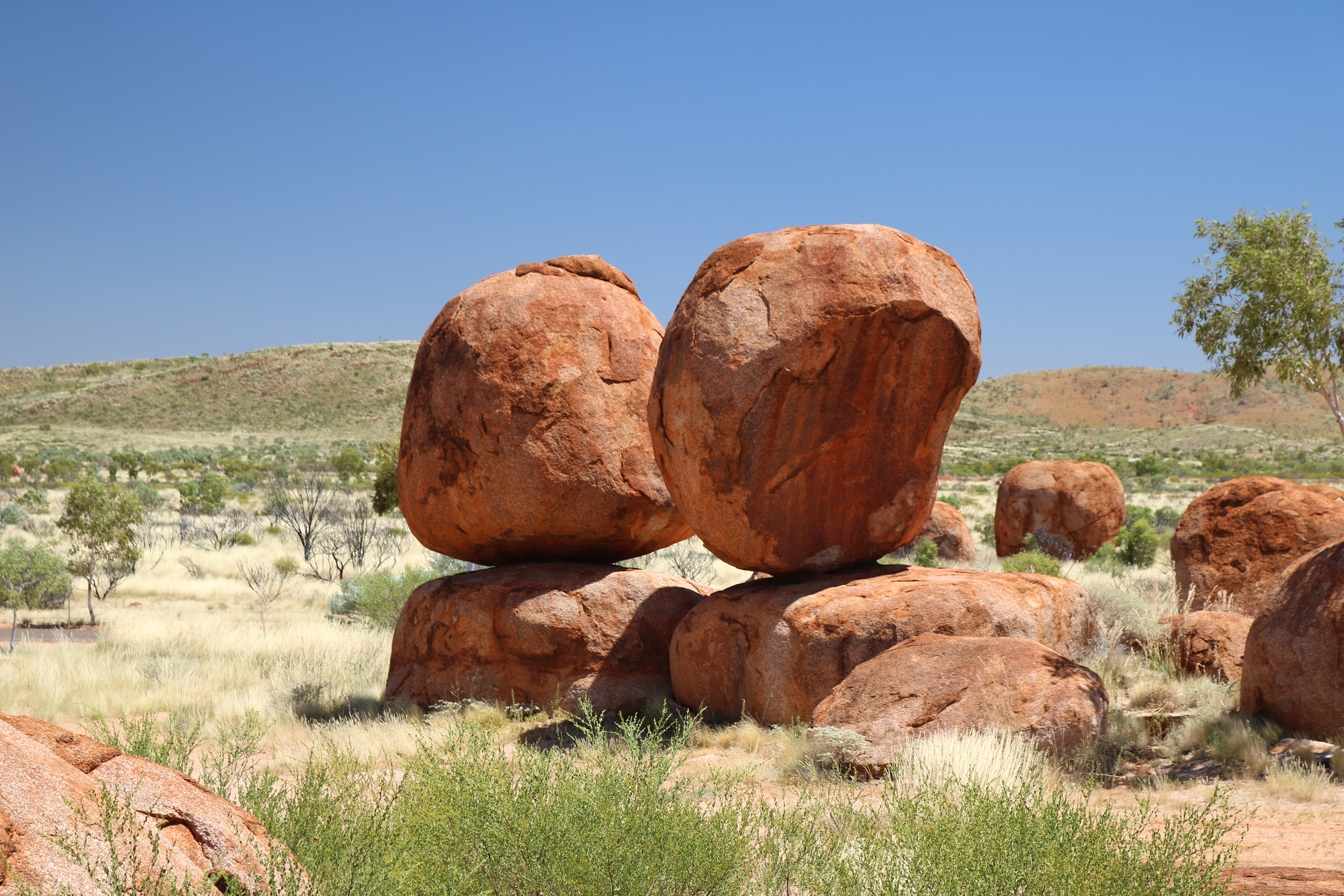
Devils Marbles

Tourism is a major industry across the Great Australian desert, and commonwealth and state tourism agencies explicitly target Outback Australia as a sought after destination for domestic and international travelers. Tourism Australia explicitly markets nature-based and Indigenous-led experiences to tourists. In the 2015–2016 financial year, 815,000 visitors spent $988 million while on holidays in the Northern Territory alone. At Katjarra, there are two camping spots, with shed tanks and long-drop toilets, and Indigenous rangers are available to show tourists the part of the range that is open to the public.

Riversleigh, in Queensland, is one of Australia's most renowned fossil sites and was recorded as a World Heritage site in 1994. The 100 km^{2} (39 sq mi) area contains fossil remains of ancient mammals, birds and reptiles of Oligocene and Miocene age.

There are several popular tourist attractions in the desert, which include:

- Arkaroola and Wilpena Pound in the Flinders Ranges
- Australian Stockman's Hall of Fame
- Devils Marbles
- Kakadu National Park
- Kata Tjuta (The Olgas)
- Katherine Gorge
- Kings Canyon (Watarrka)
- MacDonnell Ranges
- Monkey Mia
- Mount Augustus National Park
- Uluru (Ayers Rock)
- Willandra Lakes Region
- Lake Mungo
- Gawler Ranges National Park
- Gawler Ranges Conservation Park
- Great Victoria Desert Nature Reserve
- Lake Gairdner National Park
- Mamungari Conservation Park
- Munga-Thirri National Park
- Karlamilyi National Park
- Mount Willoughby Indigenous Protected Area
- Nullarbor Regional Reserve
- Pureba Conservation Park
- Queen Victoria Spring Nature Reserve
- Tallaringa Conservation Park
- Watarru Indigenous Protected Area
- Yellabinna Regional Reserve
- Yellabinna Wilderness Protection Area
- Yumbarra Conservation Park
- Black Rock Conservation Park
- Bon Bon Station Conservation Reserve
- Bunkers Conservation Reserve
- Caroona Creek Conservation Park
- Coongie Lakes Ramsar Site
- Danggali Wilderness Protection Area
- Ediacara Conservation Park
- Elliot Price Conservation Park
- Gawler Ranges National Park
- Hiltaba Nature Reserve
- Ikara-Flinders Ranges National Park
- Ironstone Hill Conservation Park
- Kanku-Breakaways Conservation Park
- Kati Thanda-Lake Eyre National Park
- Kinchega National Park
- Lake Frome Regional Reserve
- Lake Gairdner National Park
- Lake Gilles Conservation Park
- Lake Torrens National Park
- Mount Brown Conservation Park
- Mount Willoughby Indigenous Protected Area
- Munyaroo Conservation Park
- Mutawintji National Park
- Nantawarrina Indigenous Protected Area
- Pandappa Conservation Park
- Pinkawillinie Conservation Park
- Pualco Range Conservation Park
- Simpson Desert Regional Reserve
- Strzelecki Regional Reserve
- Sturt National Park
- The Dutchmans Stern Conservation Park
- Vulkathunha-Gammon Ranges National Park
- Wabma Kadarbu Mound Springs Conservation Park
- Whyalla Conservation Park
- Winninowie Conservation Park
- Witchelina Nature Reserve
- Witjira National Park
- Yalpara Conservation Park
- Yellabinna Regional Reserve
- Yellabinna Wilderness Protection Area
- Yumbarra Conservation Park
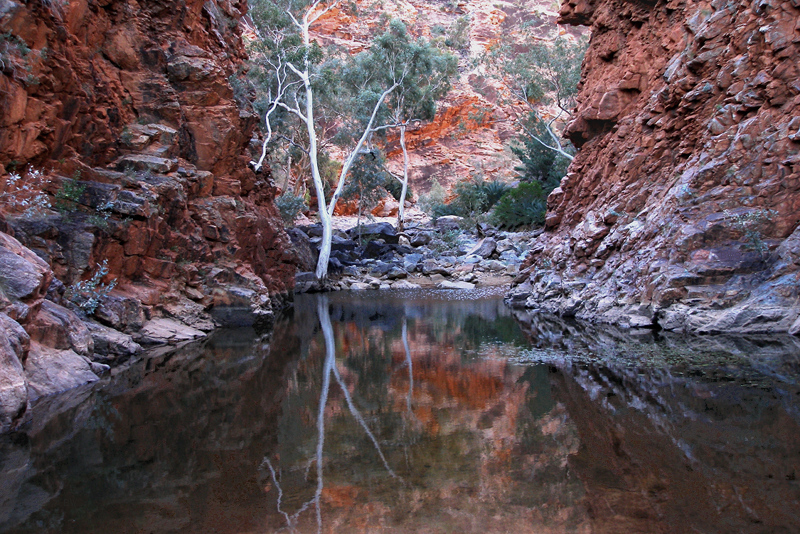
MacDonnell National Park

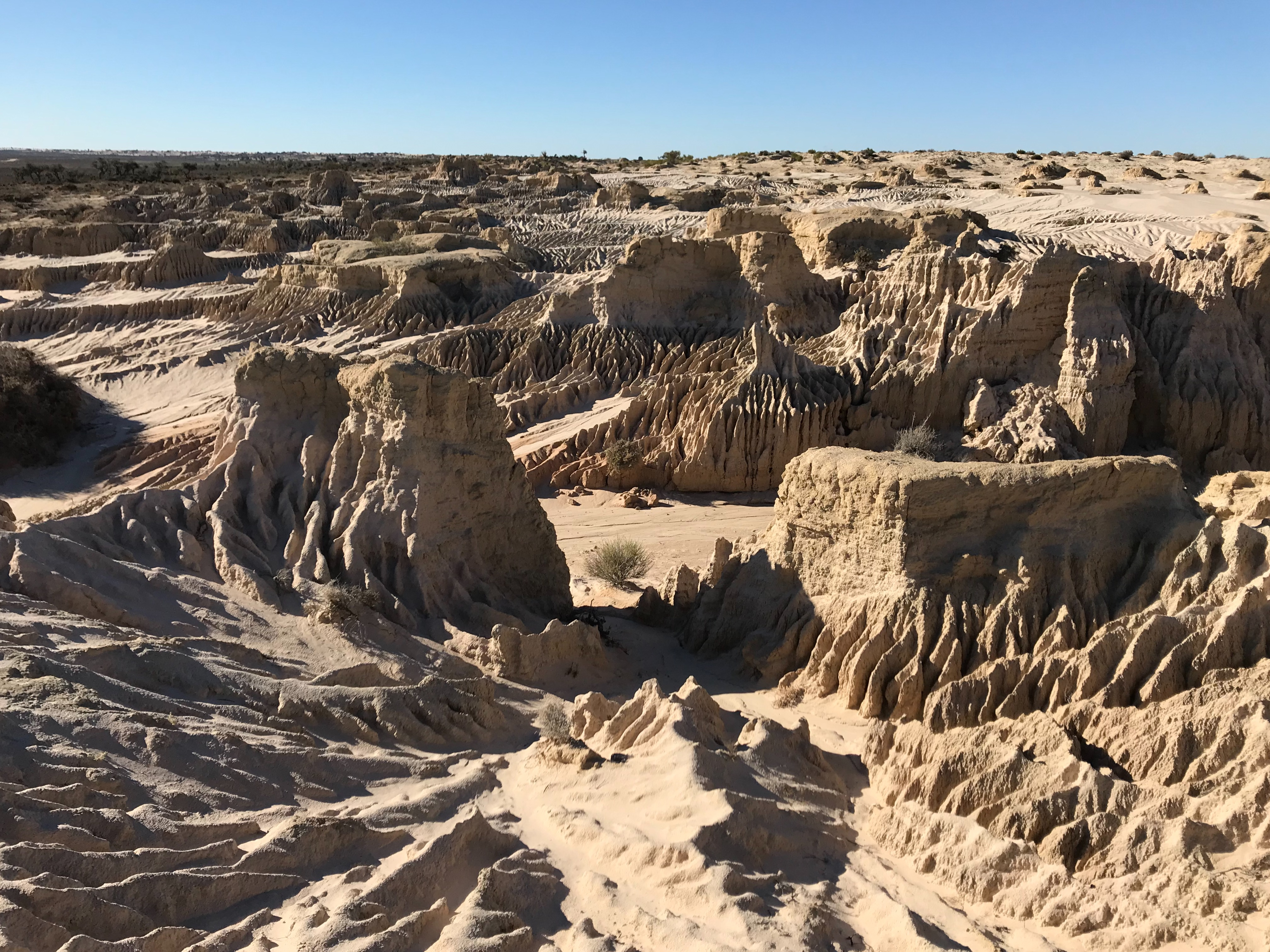
Lake Mungo National Park

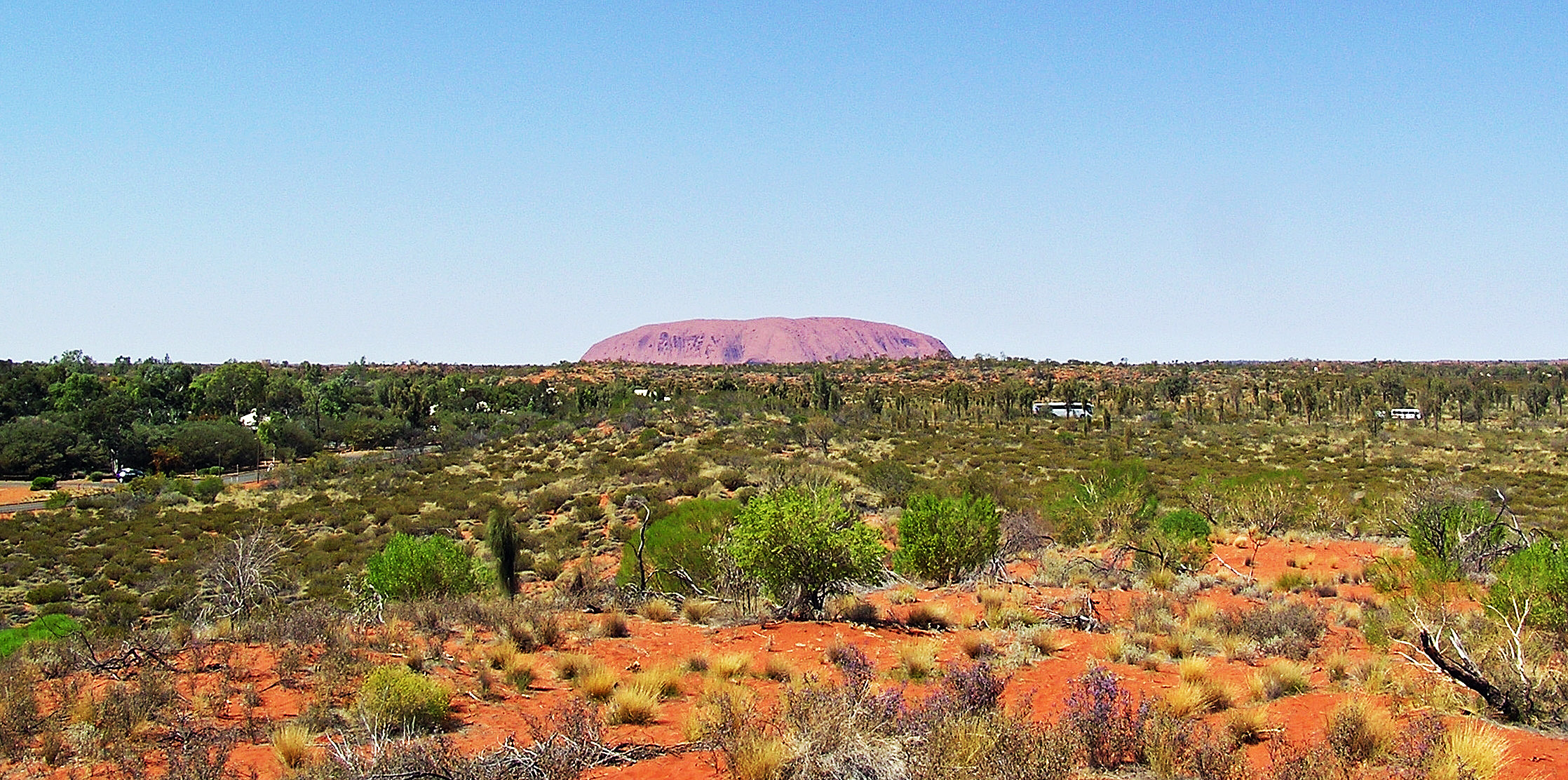
Uluru / Ayers Rock

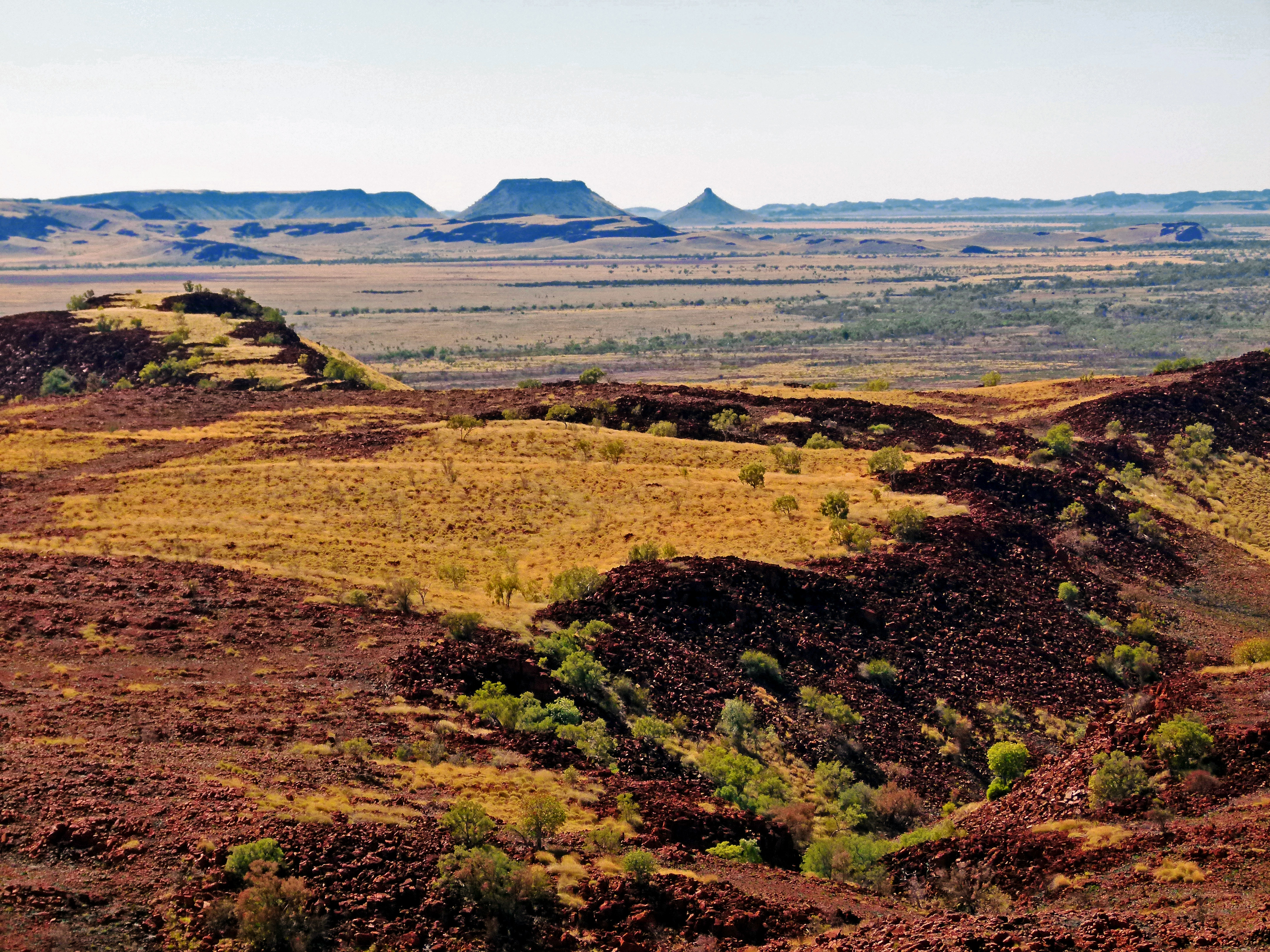
Millstream-Chichester National Park in Pilbara

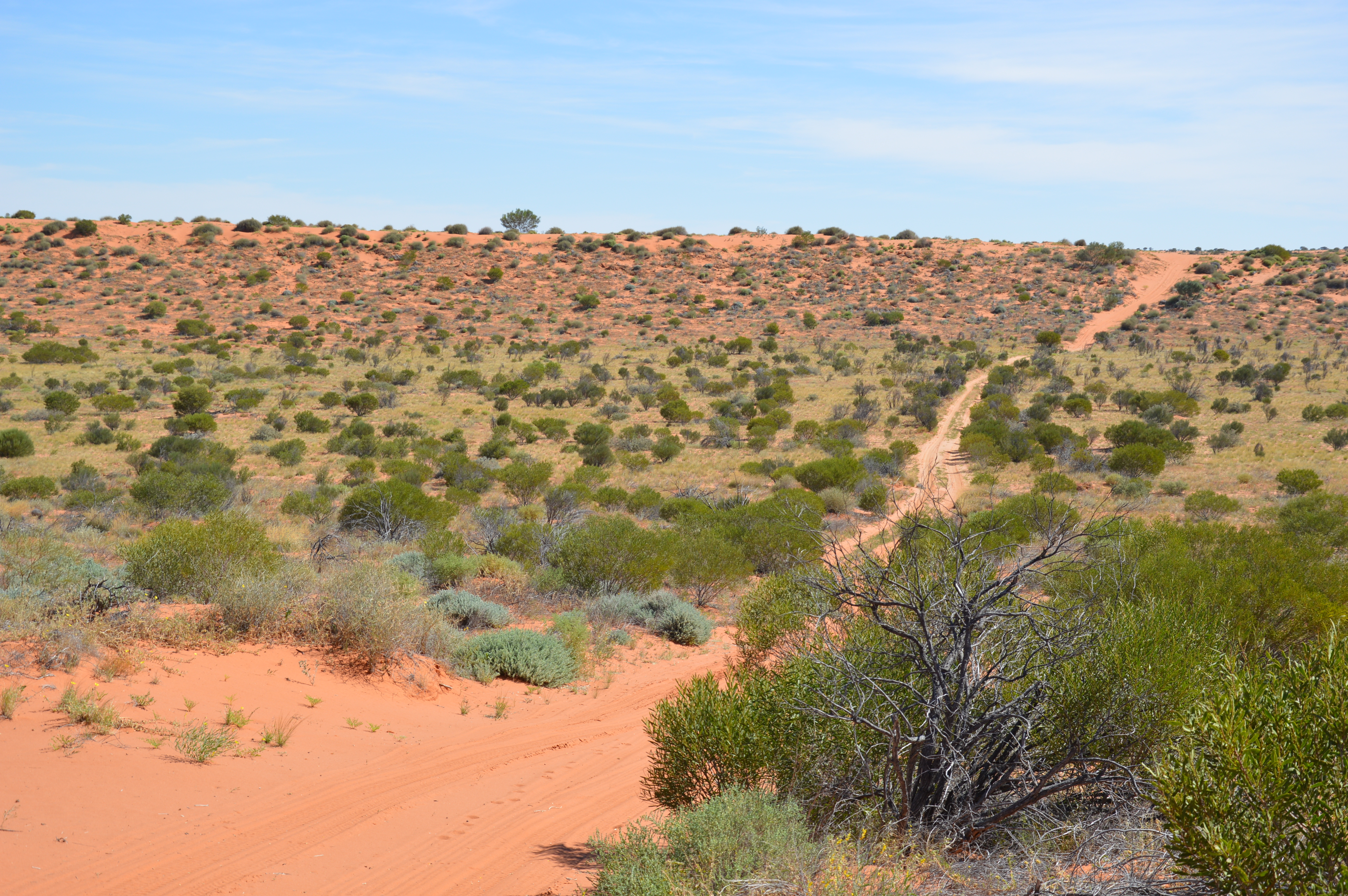
Munga-Thirri National Park in Queensland

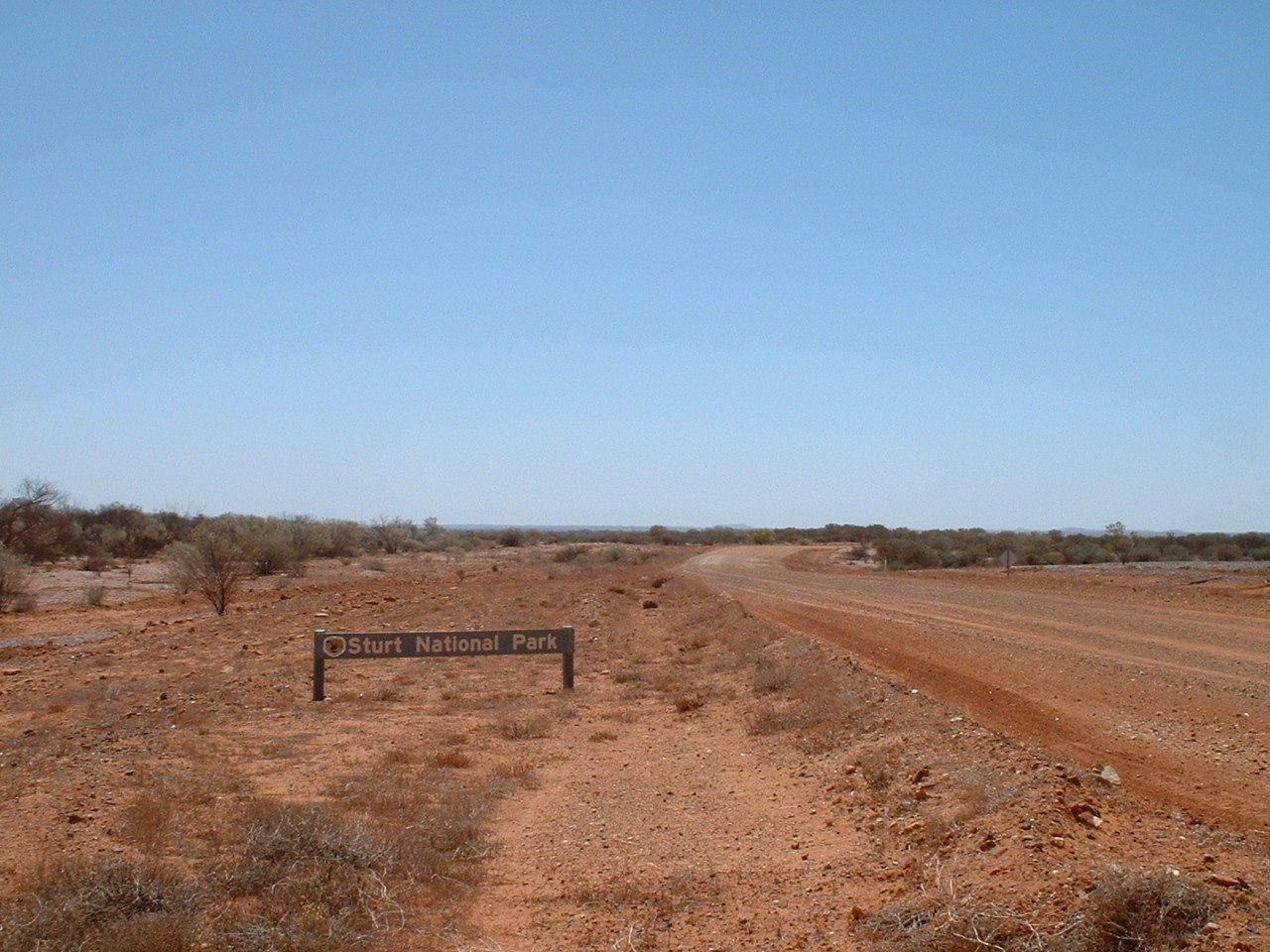
Sturt National Park

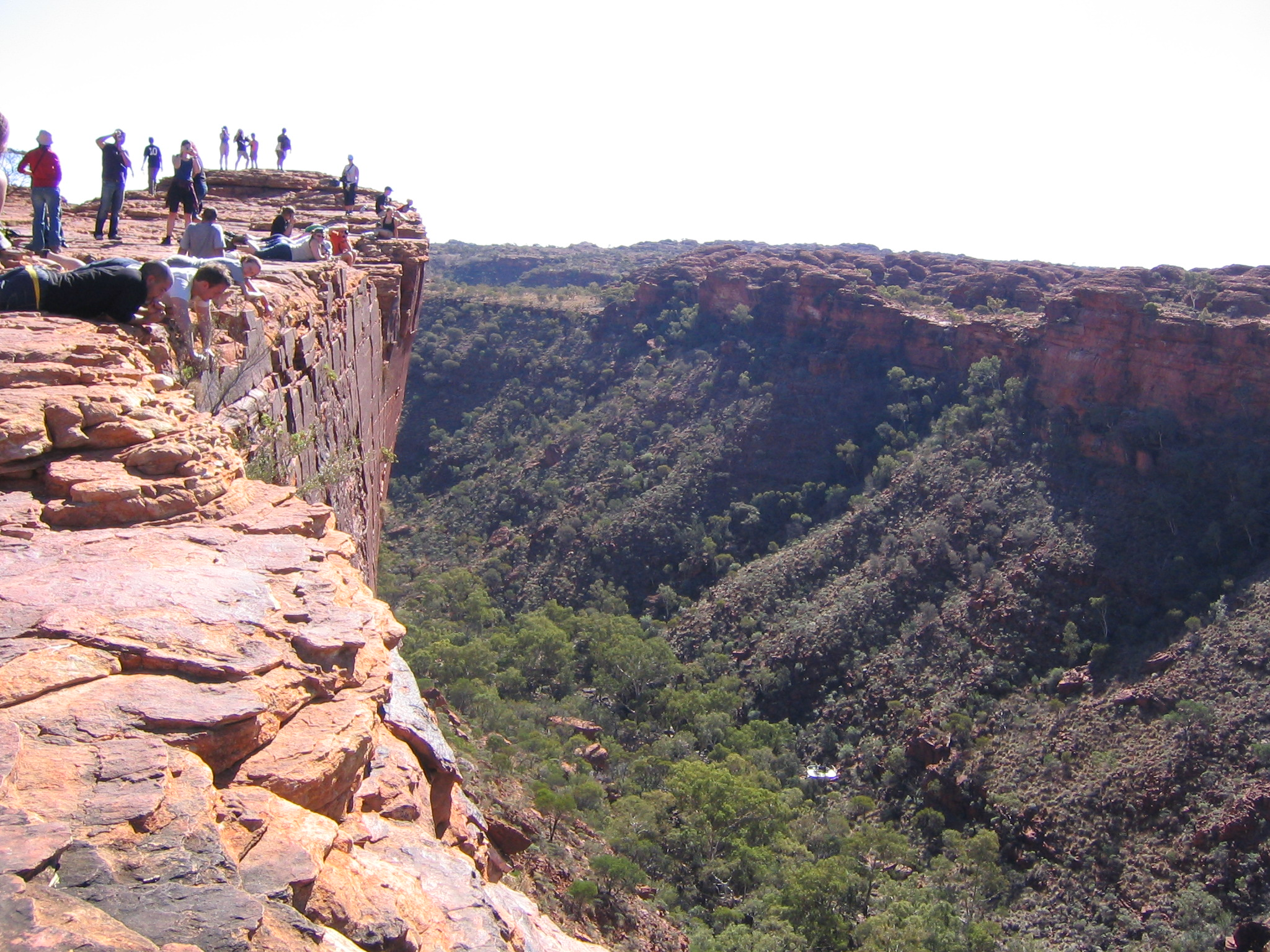
King's Canyon

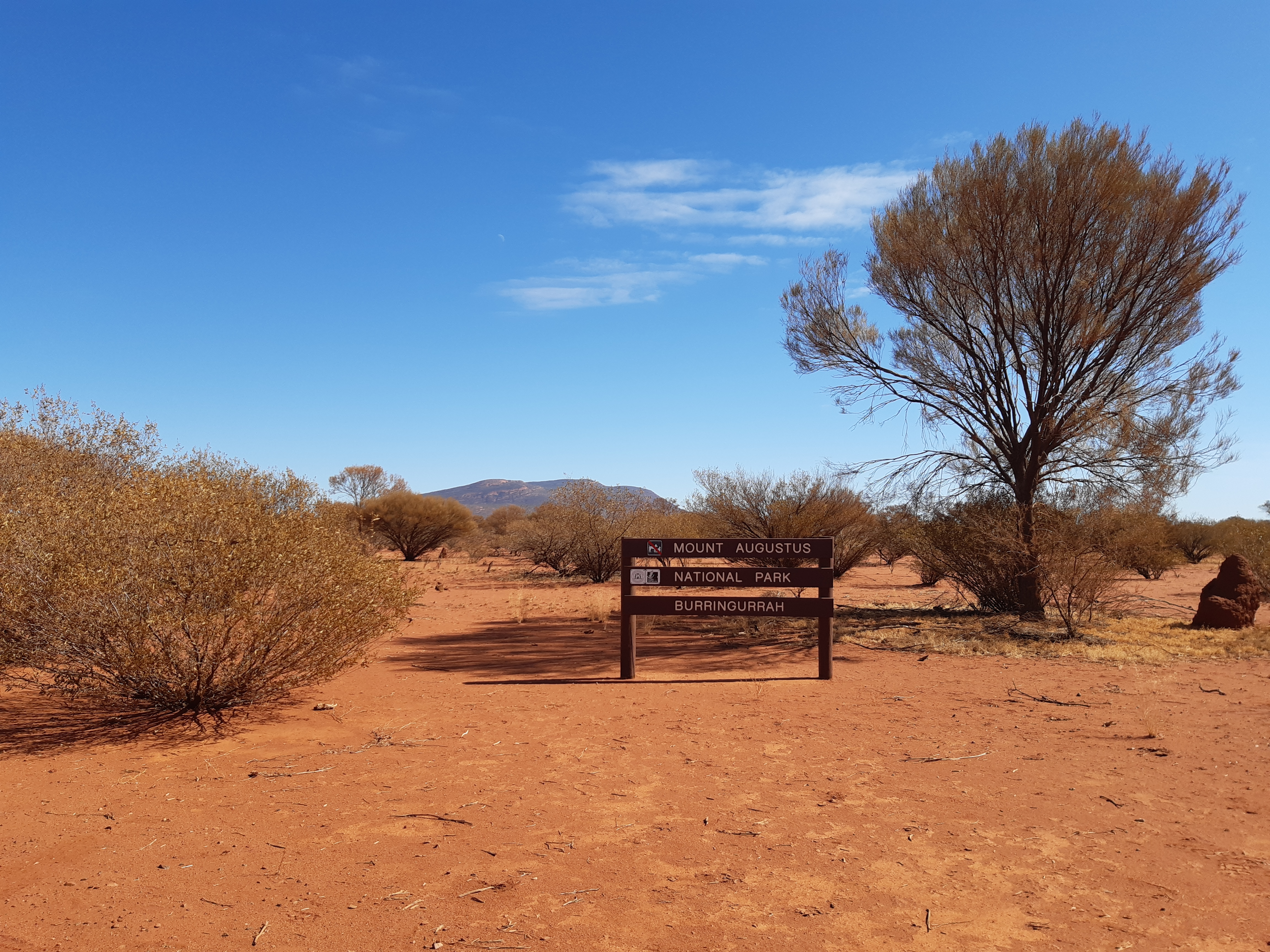
Mount Augustus National Park

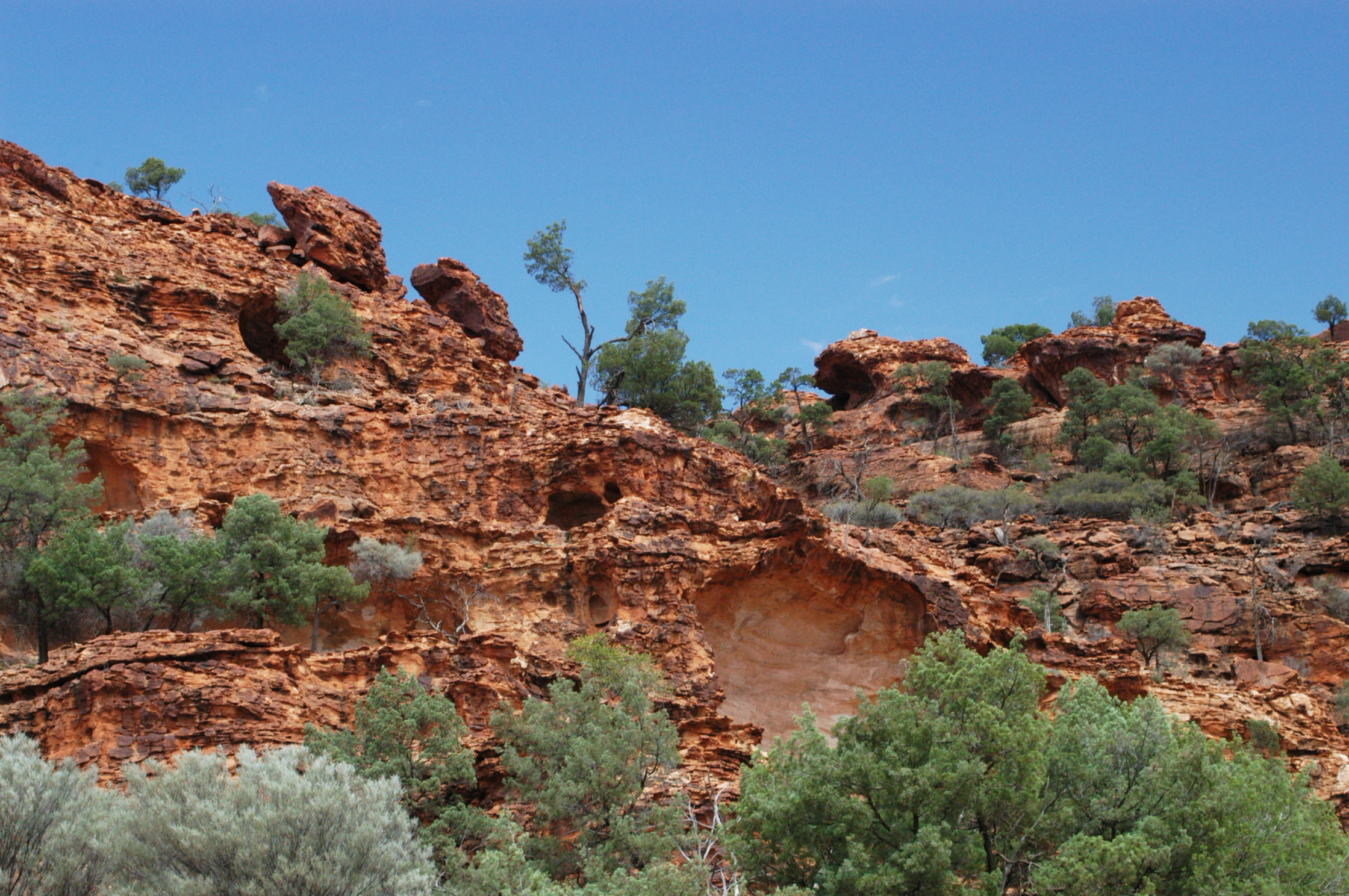
Mutawintji National Park

== Mining ==
Other than agriculture and tourism, the primary economic activity in the vast and sparsely settled desert is mining. Owing to the almost complete absence of mountain building and glaciation since the Permian (in many areas since the Cambrian) ages, the outback is extremely rich in iron, aluminum, manganese and uranium ores, and also contains major deposits of gold, nickel, copper, lead and zinc ores. Because of its size, the value of grazing and mining is considerable. Major mines and mining areas in the Outback include opals at Coober Pedy, Lightning Ridge and White Cliffs, metals at Broken Hill, Tennant Creek, Olympic Dam and the remote Challenger Mine. Oil and gas are extracted in the Cooper Basin around Moomba. The Tanami Desert features The Granites gold mine and Coyote Gold Mine.

In Western Australia the Argyle diamond mine in the Kimberley is the world's biggest producer of natural diamonds and contributes approximately one-third of the world's natural supply. The Pilbara region's economy is dominated by mining and petroleum industries. Most of Australia's iron ore is also mined in the Pilbara and it also has one of the world's major manganese mines.

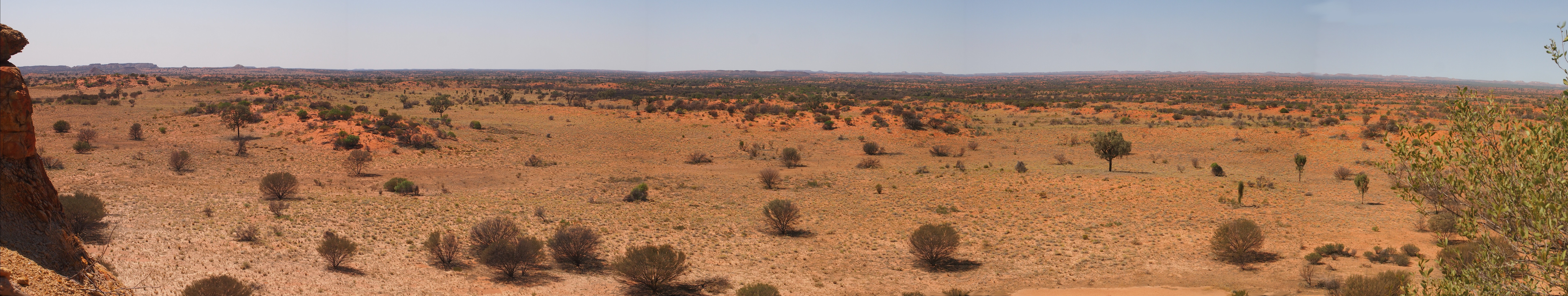
View of dunefields and mesa, Central Australia

== Transport ==
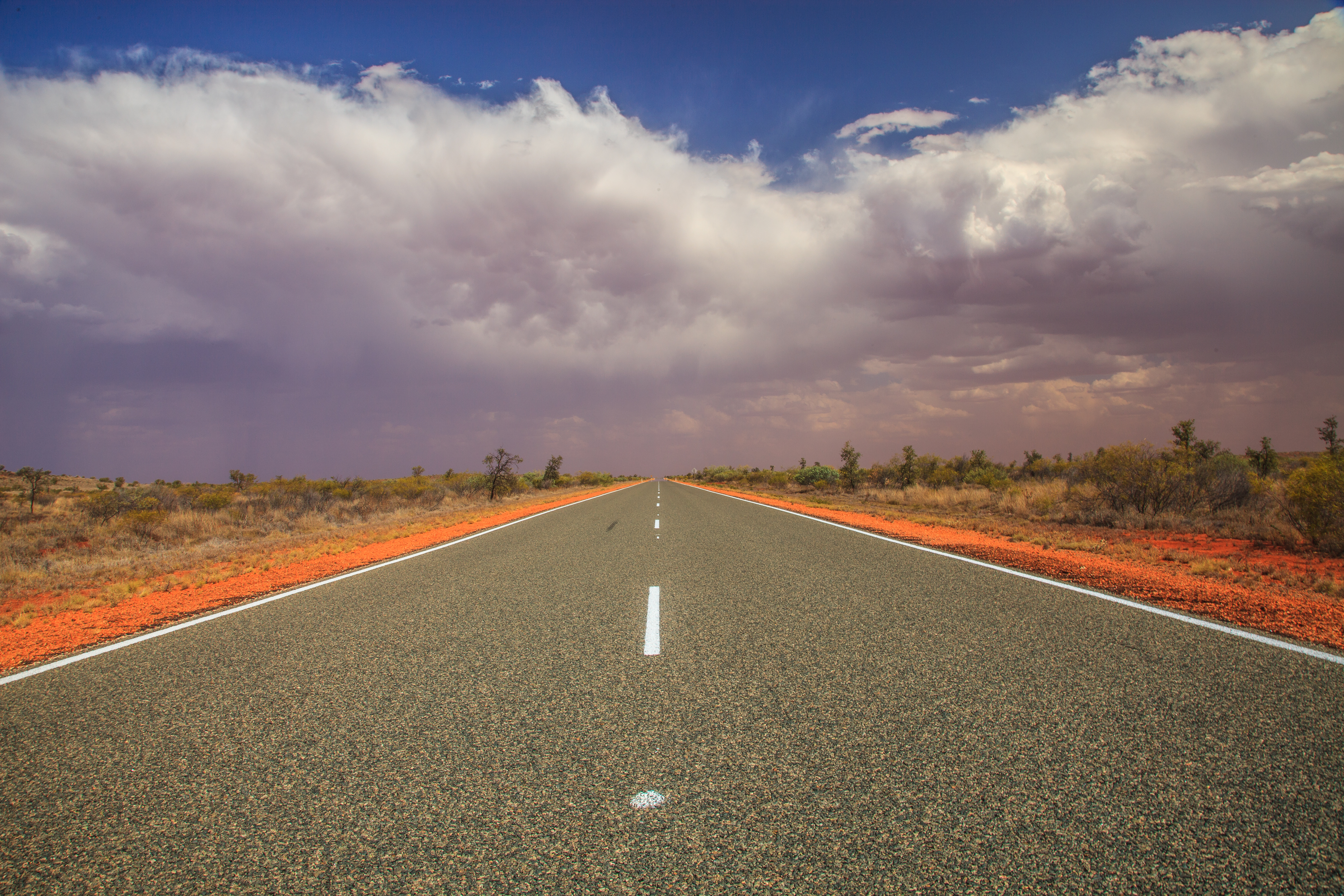
A roadway within the red desert.

The outback is reticulated by historic tracks with excellent bitumen surface and well-maintained dirt roads. The Stuart Highway runs from north to south through the centre of the continent, roughly paralleled by the Tarcoola-Darwin railway line. There is a proposal to develop some of the roads running from the south-west to the north-east to create an all-weather road named the Outback Highway, crossing the continent diagonally from Laverton, Western Australia (north of Kalgoorlie), through the Northern Territory to Winton, in Queensland. Air transport is relied on for mail delivery in some areas, owing to sparse settlement and wet-season road closures. Most outback mines have an airstrip and many have a fly-in fly-out workforce.

Roads in the desert include:

- Birdsville Track
- Burke Developmental Road
- Canning Stock Route
- Colson Track
- Connie Sue Highway
- French Line
- Gary Highway
- Gibb River Road
- Great Central Road
- Gunbarrel Highway
- Kalumburu Road
- Kidman Way
- Lasseter Highway
- Oodnadatta Track
- Peninsula Developmental Road
- Plenty Highway
- Sandover Highway
- Strzelecki Track
- Talawana Track
- Tanami Track

== Towns ==
Although the desert covers about three-quarters of the continent, it only supports around 800,000 residents – less than 5% of the Australian population. In addition, there are approximately 1,200 small Indigenous communities, of which almost half have a population of fewer than 100 people. The Royal Flying Doctor Service (RFDS) started service in 1928 and helps people who live in the outback of Australia. In former times, serious injuries or illnesses often meant death due to the lack of proper medical facilities and trained personnel. Young Indigenous adults from the Gibson Desert region work in the Wilurarra Creative programs to maintain and develop their culture. Indigenous Australians in the desert regions include the Kogara, the Mirning and the Pitjantjatjara. Aboriginal populations have been increasing in this region.

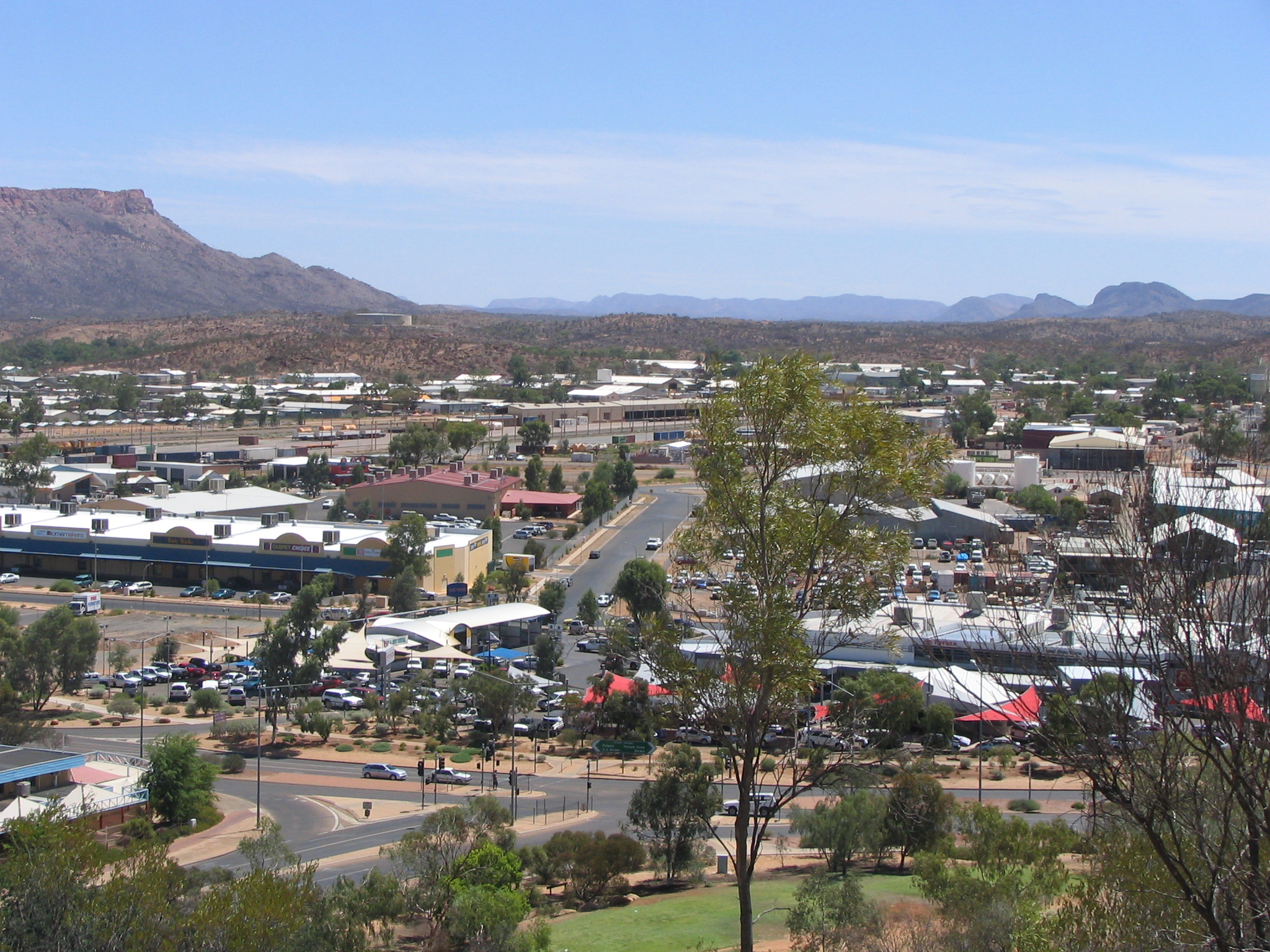
Alice Springs is a large town situated roughly in Australia's geographic red centre.

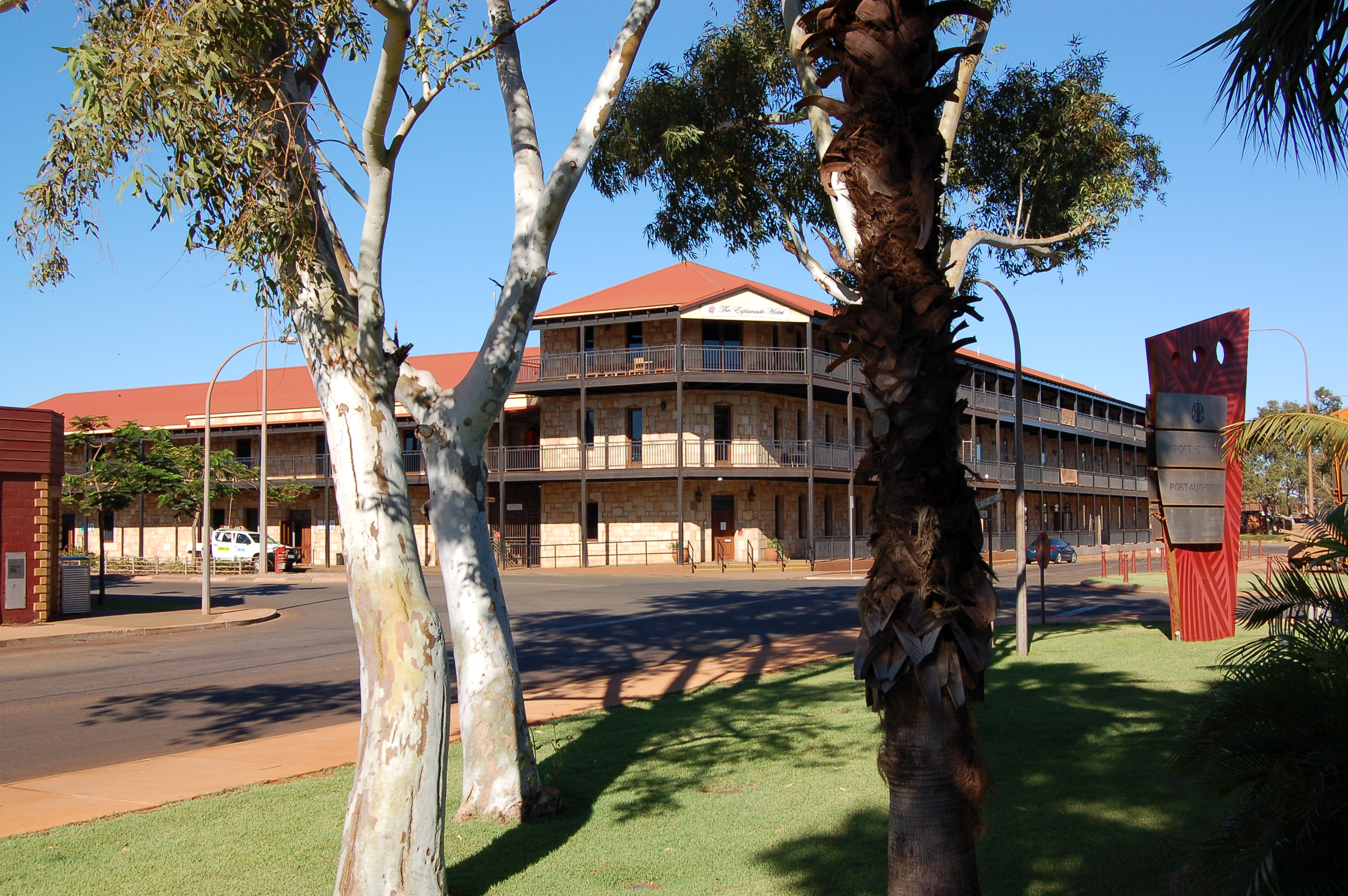
Port Hedland is a coastal, tourist town in the Pilbara region of Western Australia.

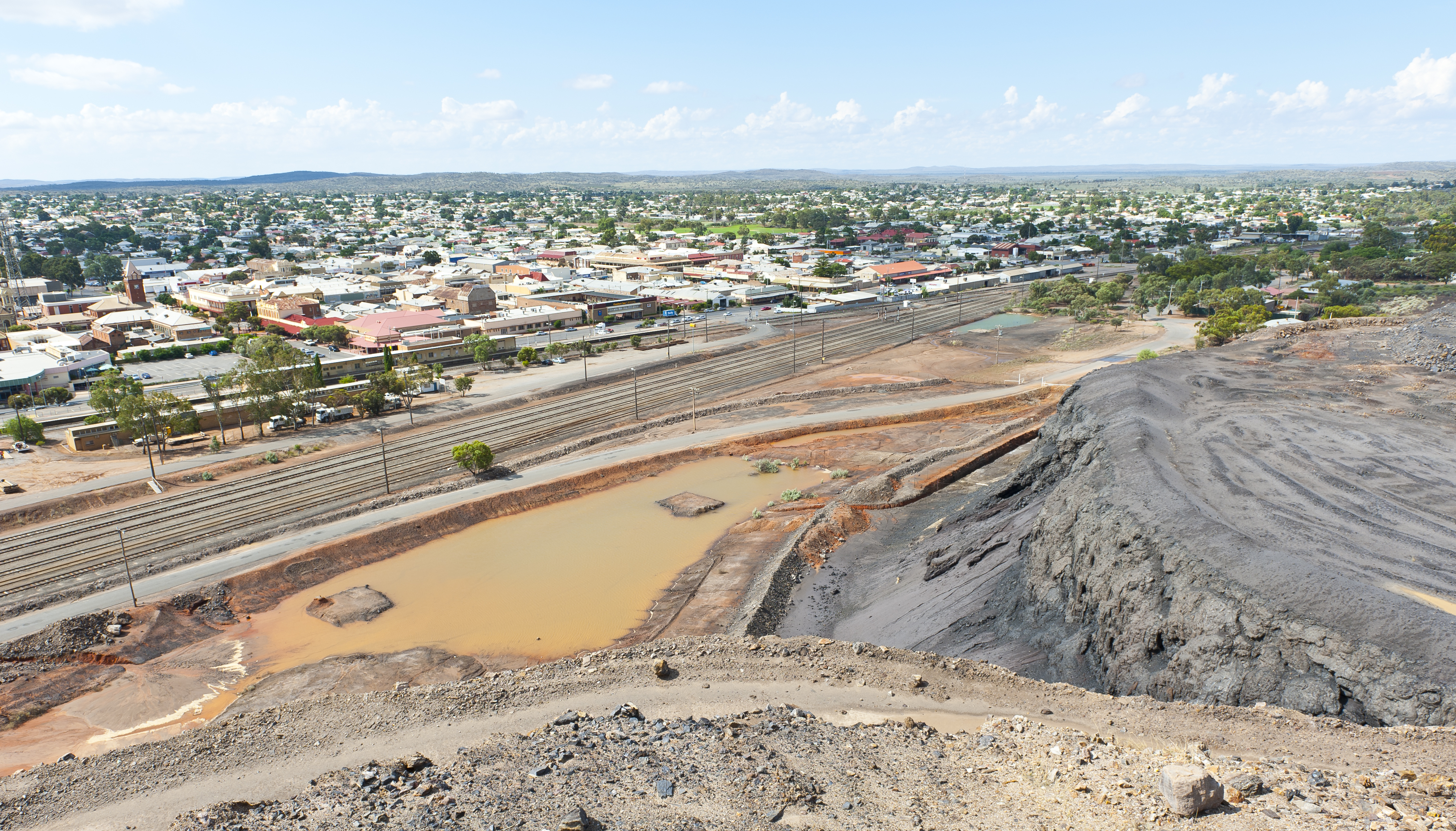
Broken Hill is a mining city in New South Wales that is known as the "Capital of the Outback".

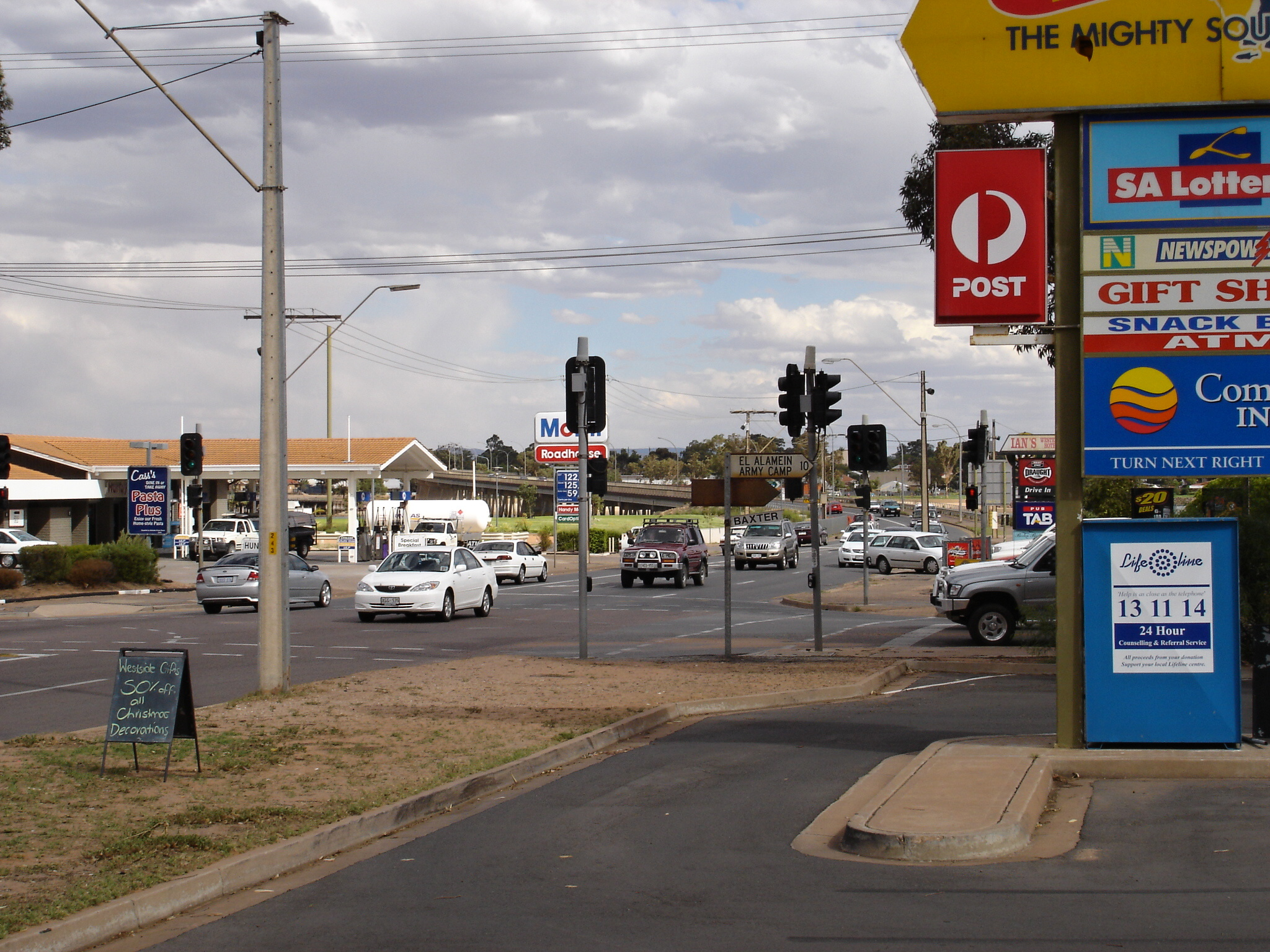
Port Augusta is a small desert city located on the Spencer Gulf.

Inhabited areas within the Great Australian desert include many towns and as well as some cities, such as:

Northern Territory

- Yulara
- Alice Springs
- Elliot
- Tennant Creek

New South Wales/Victoria

- Broken Hill
- Cobar
- Wilcannia
- Bourke
- Mildura
- Wentworth
- Tibooburra

Western Australia

- Dampier
- Kalgoorlie
- Wiluna
- Carnarvon
- Karratha
- Paraburdoo
- Port Hedland
- Halls Creek
- Fitzroy Crossing
- Newman
- Exmouth
- Meekatharra
- Eucla
- Wyndham

Queensland

- Mount Isa
- Cloncurry
- Cunnamulla
- Longreach

South Australia

- Whyalla
- Coober Pedy
- Ceduna
- Renmark
- Port Augusta
- Port Pirie
- Oodnadatta
- Roxby Downs
- Andamooka

== Languages and people ==
The Aboriginal languages with the most speakers today in the desert include Upper Arrernte, Walmajarri, Warlpiri, and the Western Desert languages within the Western Desert cultural bloc, such as the Wati languages, the Panyjima language, Wangkatha, Noongar language, the Yankunytjatjara dialect and the Pitjantjatjara dialect. There is also the Adnyamathanha language in South Australia. Other (extant) language clusters include the Kalkatungic languages, Ngarna languages Arandic languages, Ngumpin–Yapa languages, Warumungu languages, Ngayarda languages, Kanyara-Mantharta languages and Thura-Yura languages. Most of these languages belong in the Pama–Nyungan language family.

Ethnic groups include the Kartudjara, Warumungu people, Pitjantjatjara, Panyjima people, Kuyani, Yankunytjatjara, Kunapa, Manjiljarra, Ayerrereng, Yuruwinga, Yulparija and the Maduwongga.

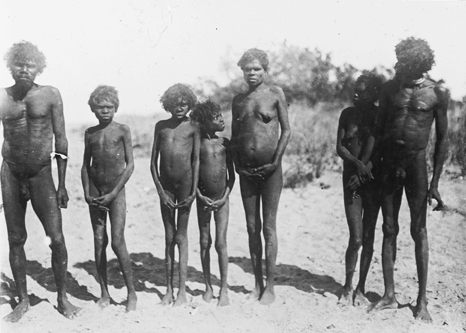
Cape Dombey people in Northern Territory, circa 1905

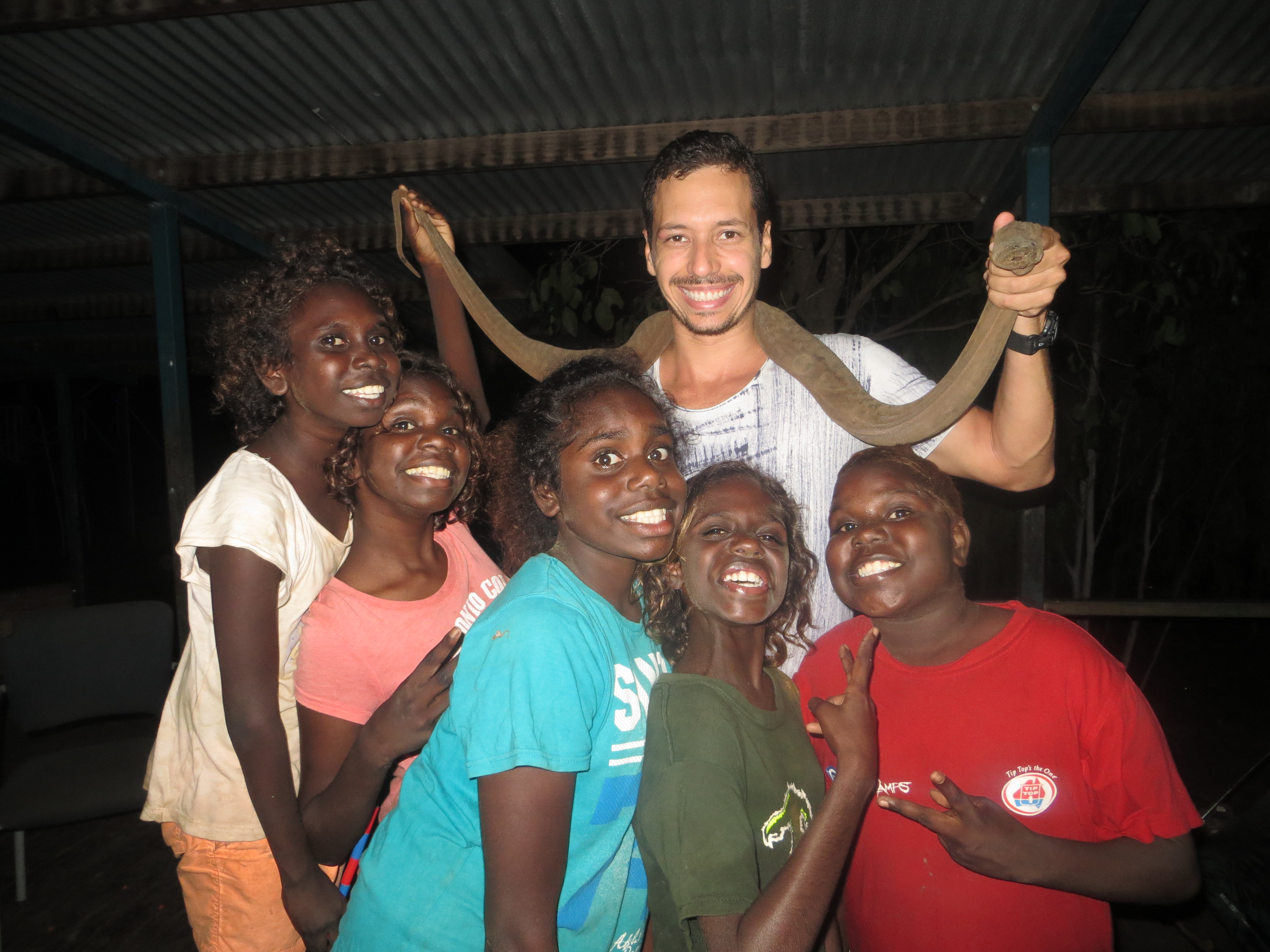
Aboriginal tribe in NT

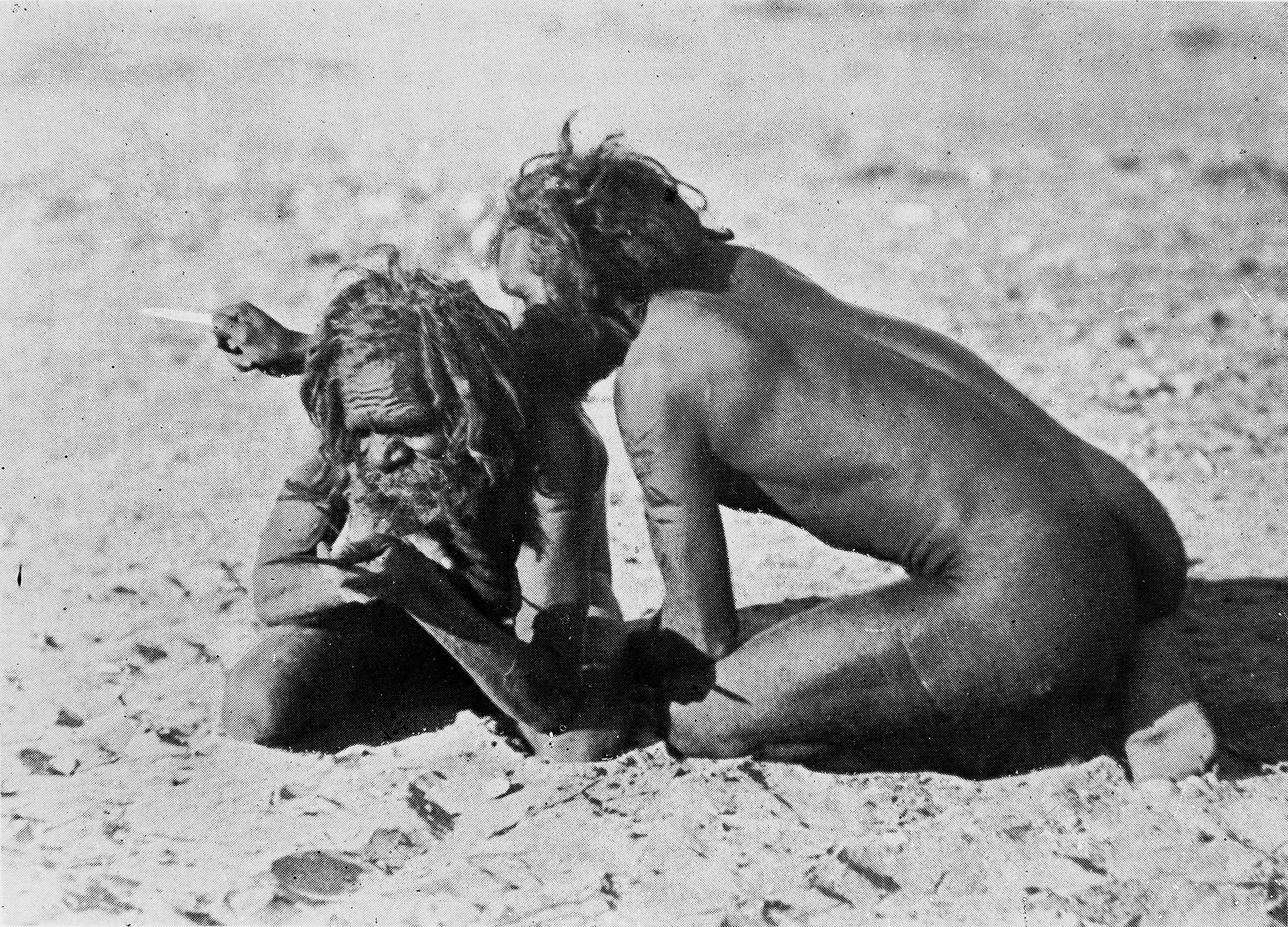
Luritja people

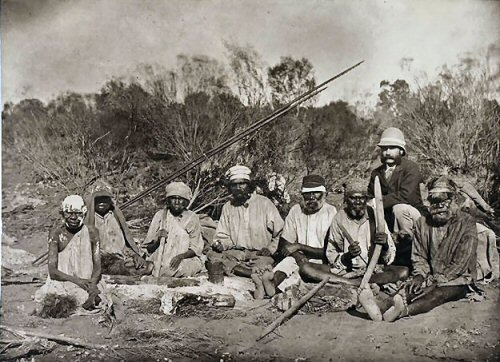
Frederic Bonney with an Aboriginal tribe

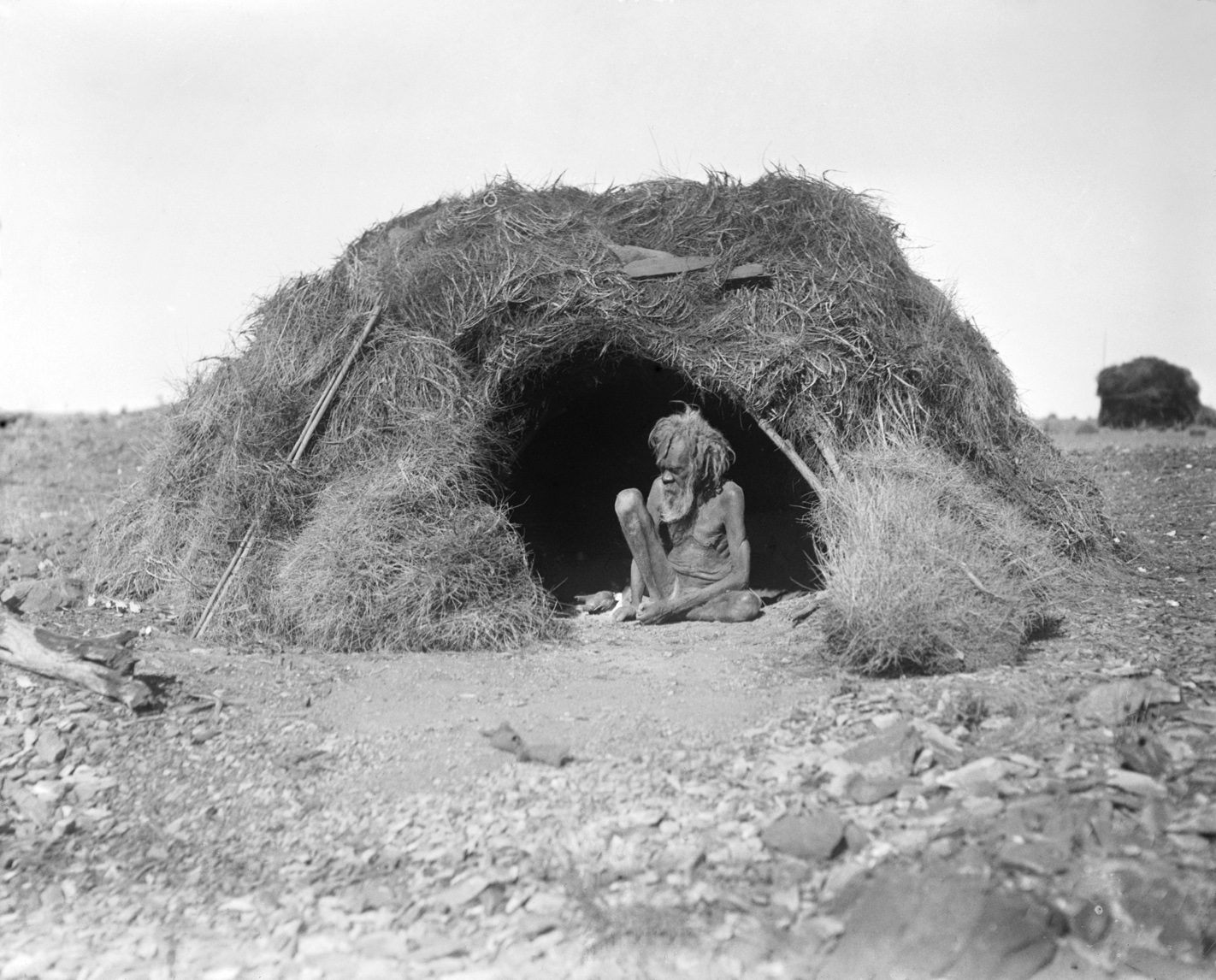
Eastern Arrernte people, Arltunga district, Northern Territory

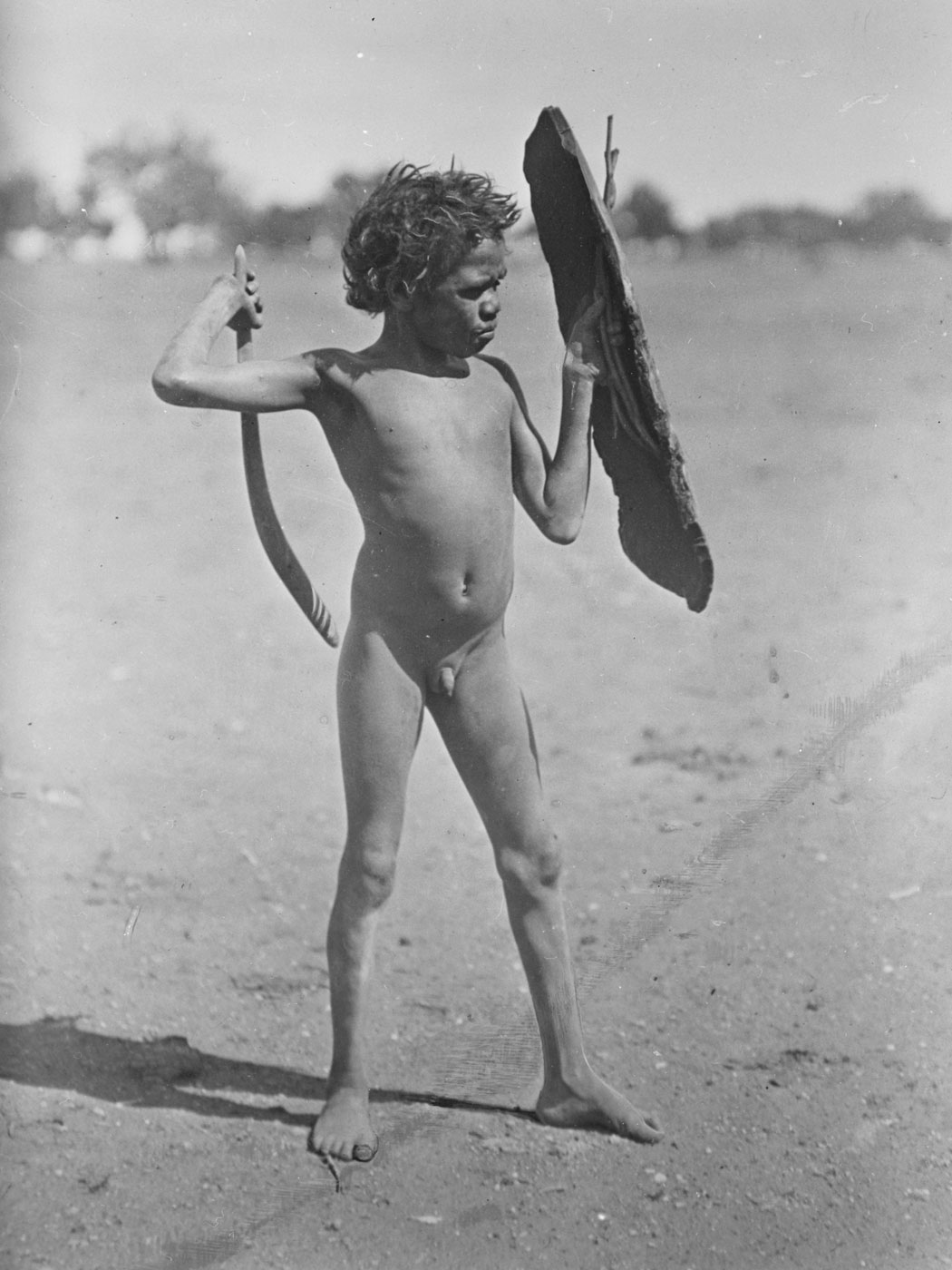
Arrernte boy, South Australia

== Popular culture ==
Popular movies set or filmed in the Australian desert include:

- Kangaroo (1952)
- Wake in Fright (1971)
- Walkabout (1971)
- Mad Max (1979)
- The Road Warrior (1981)
- Mad Max Beyond Thunderdome (1985)
- Crocodile Dundee (1986)
- Crocodile Dundee II (1988)
- Evil Angels (1988)
- Quigley Down Under (1990)
- The Rescuers Down Under (1990)
- The Adventures of Priscilla, Queen of the Desert (1994)
- Napoleon (1995)
- Welcome to Woop Woop (1997)
- Rabbit-Proof Fence (2002)
- The Tracker (2002)
- Kangaroo Jack (2003)
- Wolf Creek (2005)
- The Proposition (2005)
- Rogue (2007)
- Australia (2008)
- Lake Mungo (film) (2008)
- Bran Nue Dae (2009)
- Last Ride (2009)
- Samson and Delilah (2009)
- Red Dog (2012)
- Satellite Boy (2012)
- Blinky Bill the Movie (2015)
- Sweet Country (2017)
- Bilby (2018)
- High Ground (2020)
- Furiosa: A Mad Max Saga (2024)

== See also ==
- Bushland
- Irrigation in Australia
- Outback
- The bush
