= Kurajarra =

Indigenous Australian people

The Kurajarra were an Aboriginal Australian people of the Pilbara region of Western Australia.

Their existence as a people was overlooked in Norman Tindale's classic 1974 survey of Australian Aboriginal tribal groups and their language is unattested.

== Country ==
The Kurajarra were a small tribe whose territorial extension is not known other than that its heartland lay in the McKay Range (Pungkulyi) some 48 kilometres (30 mi) northwest of Kumpupintil Lake. They lived between the Nyiyaparli to their west, the Wanman to the north, the Kartudjara on their eastern and southeastern side, and the Putidjara to the south.

== People ==
Like the Ngulipartu, the Kurajarra were a numerically small tribe which, under the stress of post-contact migrations and change, diminished rapidly, with many of them being absorbed into neighbouring tribes through intermarriage. Writing in 1989, Tonkinson stated that only a handful of descendants survived from the original tribe.

== Sources ==
- "AIATSIS map of Indigenous Australia". AIATSIS. 14 May 2024.
- "Tindale Tribal Boundaries" (PDF). Department of Aboriginal Affairs, Western Australia. September 2016. Archived from the original (PDF) on 8 March 2016.
- Tonkinson, Robert (1989). "Local Organisation and Land Tenure in the Karlamilyi (Rudall River) Region" (PDF). In Western Desert Working Group (ed.). The significance of the Karlamilyi Region to the Martujarra people of the Western Desert. Perth: Department of Conservation and Land Management. pp. 99–259.
