= Acacia auripila =

Rudall River myall

Conservation status
- Priority Two — Poorly Known Taxa (DEC)

Scientific classification
- Kingdom: Plantae
- Clade: Tracheophytes
- Clade: Angiosperms
- Clade: Eudicots
- Clade: Rosids
- Order: Fabales
- Family: Fabaceae
- Subfamily: Caesalpinioideae
- Clade: Mimosoid clade
- Genus: Acacia
- Species: A. auripila

Binomial name
- Acacia auripila R.S.Cowan & Maslin

Synonyms
- Acacia sp. aff. rigens; Racosperma auripilum (R.S.Cowan & Maslin) Pedley

Species of legume

Acacia auripila, commonly known as Rudall River myall, is a species of flowering plant in the family Fabaceae and is endemic to a small area in central Western Australia. It is a tree with terete, leathery, striated phyllodes, spherical spikes of golden-yellow flowers, and papery pods up to 65 mm (2.6 in) long.

== Description ==
Acacia auripila is a tree that typically grows to a height of up to about 3 m (9.8 ft) and has a dense crown with silvery green foliage. It has fissured grey bark and slightly ribbed branchlets. Its phyllodes are straight to slightly curved, terete and leathery, 80–120 mm (3.1–4.7 in) long and 1–1.5 mm (0.039–0.059 in) wide with many parallel veins. The flowers are borne in up to four spherical heads on a peduncle 4–8 mm (0.16–0.31 in) long, each head 4.5–5.0 mm (0.18–0.20 in) in diameter with 35 to 40 golden-yellow flowers. Flowering has been recorded in June and August, and the pods are papery, straight, about 65 mm (2.6 in) long, 5.0–5.5 mm (0.20–0.22 in) wide and more or less raised over the seeds.

== Taxonomy ==
Acacia auripila was first formally described in 1999 by the botanists Richard Sumner Cowan and Bruce Maslin in the journal Nuytsia, from specimens collected by Paul Graham Wilson in the Rudall River district in 1971. The specific epithet (auripila) means 'golden hairs', referring to hairs on the perianth.

== Distribution and habitat ==
Rudall River myall is restricted a small area in the Rudall River National Park where it grows in spinifex communities in dry, quartzitic gravel, in the Little Sandy Desert bioregion of central Western Australia.

== Conservation status ==
Acacia auripila is listed as "Priority Two" by the Western Australian Government Department of Biodiversity, Conservation and Attractions, meaning that it is poorly known and from only one or a few locations.

== See also ==
- List of Acacia species
