= Martu people =

Grouping of Aboriginal peoples in Western Australia

The Martu or Mardu are a grouping of several Aboriginal Australian peoples in the Western Desert cultural bloc.

== Name ==
The Martu people spoke various Wati languages in the Western Desert dialect continuum whose identity coalesced after coming into increased contact with one another after the establishment of Jigalong. Since the 1980s the Martu term for person (mardu meaning "one of us") has prevailed among the peoples at Jigalong, Wiluna, Punmu, Parnngurr and Kunawarritji.

In 1974 Norman Tindale wrote that the term had been applied to several groups in this area, among them the Kartudjara, and had no tribal significance but simply denoted that the people there had undergone full initiation.

== Languages ==
The Martu languages belong to the Wati subgroup of the Pama–Nyungan language family and are collectively called Martu Wangka, or "Martu Speak". Many Martu speak more than one language and for many, English is a common second language.

== Country ==
Their traditional lands are a large tract in the Great Sandy Desert, within the Pilbara region of Western Australia, including Jigalong, Telfer (Irramindi), the Warla (Percival Lakes), Karlamilyi (Rudall River) and Kumpupintil Lake areas.

Today, most Martu reside in communities at Punmu, Kunawaritji, and Parnngurr, although they still maintain access to their traditional lands. Many Martu live in the town of Wiluna and surrounds.

== Social organisation ==
The Martu comprise five distinct groups, defined in terms of their traditional languages:

- Mandjildjara
- Kartudjara
- Keiadjara
- Putidjara
- Wanman

Although familial ties can spread across vast distances, Martu people maintain them by travelling between settlements, causing the size of settlements to fluctuate as much as between 40 and 80 inhabitants. Motor vehicles have allowed many to live with their families in town while regularly accessing their traditional hunting grounds up to an hour away. Whole families can also migrate between settlements to follow seasonal resources or fulfill ritual obligations. Larger communities like Parnngurr consist of smaller "hearth groups", collections of individuals with familial connections that co-reside in camps around shelters supplied by the government. During cold months, when these groups start living within the shelters, sleeping spaces are divided based on age and kinship, but elders usually maintain the whole residence.

== Modern history ==
The creation of the Canning Stock Route in 1906–07 was a brutal time for many Martu people, who were forced to serve as guides and reveal water sources after being run down by men on horseback, restrained by heavy chains and tied to trees at night. A Royal Commission in 1908 exonerated government surveyor Alfred Canning, after an appearance by Kimberley explorer John Forrest who asserted that all explorers had acted in such a fashion.

Starting with the establishment of settlements like Bidyadanga, Papunya, and Jigalong, many Martu people moved or were taken to these settlements, especially to Jigalong, where missionaries and officials encouraged them to stop foraging by causing reliance on market goods. While they did incorporate market goods into their economy, their communion at Jigalong served their realisation of common interests and identities as Martu more than it did their assimilation to European institutions.

The rabbit-proof fence runs through Martu territory and the film of the same name, based on a biographical novel by Doris Pilkington Garimara, depicts the lives of three Martu girls, Doris's mother Molly Craig, Daisy Craig and Gracie Fields who escaped from the Moore River Native Settlement to trek back on foot to Jigalong.

Despite movement towards Jigalong, some Martu had not seen white people before the 1960s, but knew of them from their ancestors, who had generally avoided them since the creation of the Canning Stock Route, though some groups, especially when heavy rains secured better water sources, to move north towards stations and missions. In 1964, Blue Streak missile tests were programmed to be launched into a sector of the area. The missiles, fired from Woomera, were designed to dump in traditional Martu territory. Successive Western Desert Aboriginals had "come in", or were "brought in" to overcrowded settlements, such as Papunya.

In May of that year two patrol officers, Walter MacDougall and Terry Long, tasked with ensuring that the target area south of the Percival Lakes was clear of Aboriginal people, sighted a small clan of Martu, consisting of 20 women and children. Some were widowed: the husbands of five had gone missing over the last several years, two had died from spearing. Terrified of the white men's four-wheeled Jeeps, which they thought were monstrous "moving rocks", the women managed to evade attempts to discover them for four months. Two Aboriginal men, Punuma Sailor and Nyani from the Pilbara Mission, were called in, and on 23 September found a woman and her child. Eventually Nyani, who spoke a language the women could understand, sent messages through to the main group, which then decided to come in, joining MacDougall and Sailor at their camp. They were moved to the Jigalong mission station.

By the time the mission at Jigalong terminated in 1969, many Martu had moved away in recognition of their common need in self determination and formed their own settlements at Punmu, Kunawaritji, and Parnngurr. In these settlements, the Martu retained some market goods from their economy in Jigalong while maintaining a dependence on foraging. This hybrid economy was supported by subsidies and community infrastructure established by the government.

The circumstances for what was one of the last first contact events in Australian history, the last being that of the Richters family, was later recounted by Yuwali, a 17-year-old girl at the time, and the book, Cleared Out: First Contact in the Western Desert, formed the basis of a 2009 documentary film Contact.

The Martu were granted native title to much of their country in 2002, after almost two decades of struggle. It was geographically the largest claim in Australia at that time. However, Karlamilyi was not included. Martu representative Teddy Biljabu commented that they had been given "a body without its heart".

== Kinship system ==
Martu society is divided into four skin groups, or subsections. There are very strict rules as to who may marry whom:

| Male skin name | Can only marry female skin name | Children will be |
|---|---|---|
| Panaka | Karimarra (Garimara) | Milangka |
| Purungu | Milangka | Karimarra (Garimara) |
| Karimarra (Garimara) | Panaka | Purungu |
| Milangka | Purungu | Panaka |

== Economy ==
While the Martu spent about half of their time foraging when they were first contacted by Europeans, the contemporary Martu economy is built around two additional activities: painting, and waged labour. These were incorporated into their economy when they started living around Jigalong and then around Punmu, Kunawaritji, and Parnngurr.

=== Foraging ===
Foraging remains an essential subsistence method for the Martu and people depart from settlements every day on foraging trips. Men spend about 17 per cent of their days foraging while women spend about 13 per cent. However, foraging has also been modernised; people use metal tools and rifles rather than wooden and stone tools and traditional spear throwers. People also rely heavily on motorised vehicles to maintain their foraging grounds while staying in a much more centralised community than would be possible in their pre-colonial economy. Except for some food sources, like bustards and camels, most resources are collected and consumed on individual foraging trips, rather than being taken back to the community. On these foraging trips around eight people ride to a foraging area and individually go on foraging "bouts", after which they recollect near the vehicle and consume their catch. Larger, higher risk resources are processed by elder individuals while lower risk resources are processed by those who collect them. After processing is complete, everything is shared among all present, regardless of how much each person contributed. These "dinner time camps" serve both the economic function of food consumption and a social function as places where people can convene and converse. The attendees then return to the community once they are satisfied.

=== Art ===
Although Martu production of art for market had gradually expanded with their introduction to new media, it became a much greater part of the Martu economy with the formation of Martumili, an arts cooperative. Art conveys traditional topics, usually Dreaming tracts, but the materials used, like acrylic on canvas, are mostly modern. Art production is performed on occasion and single compositions may be composed across multiple brief sittings. Although art production would be profitable as a full time profession, with some paintings costing up to A$5,000, it is rarely used as such, probably due to social obligations or other economic pursuits.

Manyjilyjarra woman Ngarga Thelma Judson (born mid-1950s) is one of the Martumili artists, who has lived in Parnngurr since the 1980s. In 2013, Judson, along with her sister Rina, and "everybody in Parnngurr" painted a huge canvas called Yarrkalpa — Hunting Ground), which symbolically depicts the area around Parnngurr, showing the seasons, cultural burning practices and Indigenous management of the land and natural resources. In June 2022, the work was projected onto the Sydney Opera House as part of the Vivid Sydney festival, accompanied by the music of electronic music duo Electric Fields and animated by creative technologists Curiious. The painting itself is at the same time on display in Berlin, Germany, as part of a travelling exhibition called Songlines: Tracking the Seven Sisters, which originated at the National Gallery of Australia in 2017.

=== Other sources of income ===
The regular obligatory time commitments that come with waged labour tend to discourage Martu from pursuing it as social obligations are usually prioritised. Thus, most waged labour in Martu communities occurs when there people are available to do it. It usually involves maintenance tasks within the community's confines organised by governmental programs like the Community Development and Educational Program in Parnngurr.

All Martu receive welfare which, together with art sales and waged labour, allows them to purchase the fuel that they need to forage while maintaining a centralised community. Martu also purchase some food, notably flour instead of their traditional seed dough, but much of their diet is foraged.

Some Martu people are engaged in enterprises such as the cultivation of Australian sandalwood in the Gibson Desert, as the Dutjahn Custodians.

== Diet ==
The Martu's sexual division of labour allows them to gather both predictable and high-risk items, ensuring that there is always enough food for all members in a camp. Men generally hunt kirti-kirti (wallaroo) or kipara (bustards) but succeed about only 20% of the time. 20-50% of the Martu diet is still composed of bush foods. Feral camels, an introduced species, are occasionally hunted by some, but others feel pity for the animals because they do not figure in the Dreamtime cosmology, and therefore will not hunt them. Women, with a success rate of 90%, hunt parnajarlpa (sand goanna) which can provide up to 40% of the Martu diet. Older women with extensive knowledge of the landscape light brush fires in order to expose the hiding places of the goanna that have burrowed into the ground. Digging sticks (wana) are thrust into the uncovered holes to force the lizards out. The goanna are usually cooked over a fire and shared amongst other members of the tribe.

== Firing seasons ==
Controlled brush burning, generally practised in the colder months from April to October, helps maintain much of the indigenous vegetation by removing invasive grass species. Tightly monitored burns additionally help prevent large, uncontrolled wildfires that can occur due to extremely high temperatures and dry plants and grasses. Fires are ideally restricted to roughly 20 hectares.

The Martu recognise five stages of vegetative regrowth after an area has been selectively burned:

1. nyurnma is the area freshly burnt.
2. waru-waru
3. nyukura
4. manguu
5. kunarka

The first three of these stages, lasting some years, spur the reseeding of woollybutt (Eragrostis eriopoda) and other plants, whose seeds can be ground for making damper. The firing also clears room for the growth of wattle and bush tomatoes. A large patch at the nyukura stage can yield upwards of 50kgs of solanum. The last two stages mark the reassertive dominance of large clumps of spinifex.

== Sharing of goods ==
The sharing of commodities such as food and tobacco aids in maintaining the egalitarian nature of the Martu people. Hunters will bring their catch back to the camp to share with other members of the tribe. Goanna hunters decide on their own how to distribute the meat but hunters of larger game allow an elder man to distribute the meat to the hunter's family and to others in the camp. Food sharing is one of the few ways to gain prestige in a Martu group, as they own very few personal belongings. Someone who is able to give away large quantities of meat is seen as more prestigious than someone who cannot. But prestige is generally not considered the driving force behind food sharing. It is a culturally accepted norm that has allowed the Martu to survive.

== Matuwa Kurrara Kurrara National Park ==
The Martu people, through the Tarlka Matuwa Piarku Aboriginal Corporation, jointly manage the Matuwa Kurrara Kurrara National Park which was established in May 2023 on their traditional land.

== Literature, films, and television ==
- 1966: People of the Australian Western Desert, a 19-part documentary film series about the Martu people by Ian Dunlop
- 1996: Follow the Rabbit-Proof Fence – a novel by Doris Pilkington Garimara
- 2002: Rabbit-Proof Fence – a film based on the above novel
- 2005: Cleared Out: First Contact in the Western Desert – a history published by Sue Davenport, Peter Johnson and Yuwali Cleared Out concerns the events of 1964. Yuwali, a Martu woman, was 17 at the time of first contact.
- 2008: Conversations with the Mob – a book of photographs by Megan Lewis, annotated by Kate McLeod (Crawley WA; University of Western Australia Pres)
- 2009: Contact – a film made by Bentley Dean and Martin Butler about the events of 1964 event and including footage of the encounter
- 2015: Cooked – a Netflix documentary mini-series based on Michael Pollan's book of the same name featured the Martu people in its first episode, titled "Fire". The Martu demonstrated how they hunt and cook goanna, as well as describing their connection with the ancestral lands.

== See also ==
- Martu Wangka dialect
- Wirnpa
- Bill Dunn (Pilbara elder)

== Sources ==
- Bucknall, Gwen (1997). "Nyangumarta: Alive and adapting". Australian Review of Applied Linguistics. 20 (1): 43–56. doi:10.1075/aral.20.1.03buc.
- Butler, Martin; Dean, Bentley; Davenport, Sue (2009). Contact. ABC Commercial and ARTE France – via Trove.
- Codding, Brian; Bird, Rebecca; Bird, Douglas; Zeanah, David (2016). "Alternative Aboriginal Economies: Martu Livelihoods in the 21st Century". Why Forage? Hunters and gatherers in the twenty-first century. Santa Fe, NM: SAR Press. pp. 185–211. ISBN 9780826356970.
- Davenport, Sue; Johnson, Peter (23 October 2019). "Western Desert woman told of first contact with Europeans". The Sydney Morning Herald.
- Davenport, Sue; Johnson, Peter; Yuwali (2005). Cleared out: a story of first contact in the Great Sandy Desert. Aboriginal Studies Press. ISBN 978-0-855-75457-0.
- Dean, Bentley (Director); Butler, Martin (Director) (2009). Contact: Australia's indigenous people confront the space age. Filmakers Library – via Trove.
- Dean, Bentley; Davenport, Sue; Johnson, Peter; Yuwali (2010). Cleared out: first contact in the Western Desert. Aboriginal Studies Press, AIATSIS, ABC. ISBN 978-0-85575-710-6.
- Dousset, Laurent [in French] (2011). Australian aboriginal kinship: an introductory handbook with particular emphasis on the Western Desert. Marseilles: Pacific-Credo Publications.
- Eastwood, Ken (15 December 2010). "Living the traditional Aboriginal life". Australian Geographic.
- "Fire, Water, Air, Earth: Michael Pollan Gets Elemental In 'Cooked'. (Audio file)(Interview)(Broadcast transcript)". Weekend Edition Sunday. 21 April 2013. NPR – via Trove.
- Johnson, Peter; Nixon, Yuwali; Davenport, Susan (2005). Cleared Out: First Contact in the Western Desert. Aboriginal Studies Press. ISBN 978-0-855-75457-0.
- Kay, Paul; Berlin, Brent; Maffi, Luisa; Merrifield, William (1997). "Colour naming across languages". In Hardin, C. L.; Maffi, Luisa (eds.). Color Categories in Thought and Language. Cambridge University Press. pp. 21–56. ISBN 978-0-521-49800-5.
- Kormendy, Nicolette. "WA's Martu People achieve native title recognition in Western Desert". National Native Title Tribunal. Archived from the original on 7 April 2014.
- Kuhlenbeck, Britta (2010). Re-writing Spatiality: The Production of Space in the Pilbara Region in Western Australia. LIT Verlag Münster. ISBN 978-3-643-10980-4.
- Lewis, Megan; McLeod, Kate; Lewis, Megan (2008). Conversations with the Mob. Crawley, WA: University of Western Australia Press. ISBN 978-1-921401-03-9.
- Long, Jeremy (2005). "Review: Cleared Out, First Contact in the Western Desert by Sue Davenport, Peter Johnson, Peter Yuwali". Aboriginal History. 29: 234–242. JSTOR 24046916.
- "Martu People". Western Desert Lands Aboriginal Corporation. 2019.
- Pilkington Garimara, Doris (1996). Follow the Rabbit-Proof Fence. University of Queensland Press. ISBN 070222709-9.
- Pollan, Michael (2013). Cooked: a natural history of transformation. The Penguin Press. ISBN 978-1-59420-421-0 – via Internet Archive.
- Rintoul, Stuart (27 September 2007). "Boldly out of the west". The Australian.
- Rynne, Michael (2002). "The Martu Native Title Determination" (PDF). No. 5. Native Title Newsletter. pp. 12–15.
- Stevens, Rhiannon (3 October 2019). "Remote WA town of Wiluna turns its TAFE campus around, with remarkable results". ABC News.
- Stevens, Rhiannon; Moussalli, Isabel (19 July 2020b). "Roadworkers sealing Western Australia's last dirt highway unite remote outback community". ABC News.
- Stevens, Rhiannon; Moussalli, Isabel (5 September 2020a). "From the Gibson Desert to New York, these sandalwood harvesters are winning over the perfume market". ABC News (Australian Broadcasting Corporation).
- Strain, Daniel (5 May 2010). "Aboriginal hunting and burning increase Australia's desert biodiversity". Science News.
- Tindale, Norman Barnett (1974). Aboriginal Tribes of Australia: Their Terrain, Environmental Controls, Distribution, Limits, and Proper Names. Australian National University. ISBN 978-0-708-10741-6.
- Tonkinson, Robert (2002) [First published 1991]. The Mardu Aborigines: living the dream in Australia's desert. Holt, Rinehart & Winston. ISBN 978-0-534-44087-9.
- Walsh, Fiona (2008). To hunt and to hold: Martu Aboriginal people's uses and knowledge of their country, with implications for co-management in Karlamilyi (Rudall River) National Park and the Great Sandy Desert, Western Australia (PDF). University of Western Australia PhD.
- "Who are Dutjahn Sandalwood Oils?". Dutjahn. Archived from the original on 3 March 2019.
