= Maireana eriosphaera =

Scientific classification
- Kingdom: Plantae
- Clade: Tracheophytes
- Clade: Angiosperms
- Clade: Eudicots
- Order: Caryophyllales
- Family: Amaranthaceae
- Genus: Maireana
- Species: M. eriosphaera

Binomial name
- Maireana eriosphaera Paul G.Wilson

Species of plant in the amaranth family

Maireana eriosphaera is a species of flowering plant in the family Amaranthaceae, and is endemic to Western Australia. It is an erect, loosely branched, perennial herb with a woody base, linear to narrowly oblong leaves, bisexual flowers arranged singly in dense spikes on the ends of branches, and a hemispherical, top-shaped fruiting perianth densely covered with silky wool and with a narrow, fan-shaped wing.

== Description ==
Maireana eriosphaera is an erect, loosely branched, perennial herb that typically grows to a height of up to 30 cm (12 in) and has slender branchlets covered with woolly hairs. The leaves are linear to narrowly oblong, up to 10 mm (0.39 in) long and covered with silky hairs. Its flowers are bisexual and arranged singly along a dense spike 20–100 mm (0.79–3.94 in) long on the ends of branches. The fruiting perianth is on a thin pedicel 0.5–1 mm (0.020–0.039 in) long and densely covered with long, silky wool forming a soft ball about 10 mm (0.39 in) in diameter and has a thin tube 1.5–2.5 mm (0.059–0.098 in) high with a very narrow horizontal wing.

== Taxonomy ==
Maireana eriosphaera was first formally described in 1975 by Paul Wilson in the journal Nuytsia from specimens he collected in the upper Rudall River area in 1971. The specific epithet (eriosphaera) means 'wool ball', referring to the fruiting perianth.

== Distribution and habitat ==
This species of Maireana grows in clay at the base of breakaways and near salt lakes between the Rudall River and Norseman in the Avon Wheatbelt, Carnarvon, Coolgardie, Gascoyne, Gibson Desert, Great Victoria Desert, Little Sandy Desert, Murchison, Pilbara and Yalgoo bioregions of Western Australia.

== Conservation status ==
Maireana eriosphaera is listed as "not threatened" by the Government of Western Australia Department of Biodiversity, Conservation and Attractions.
