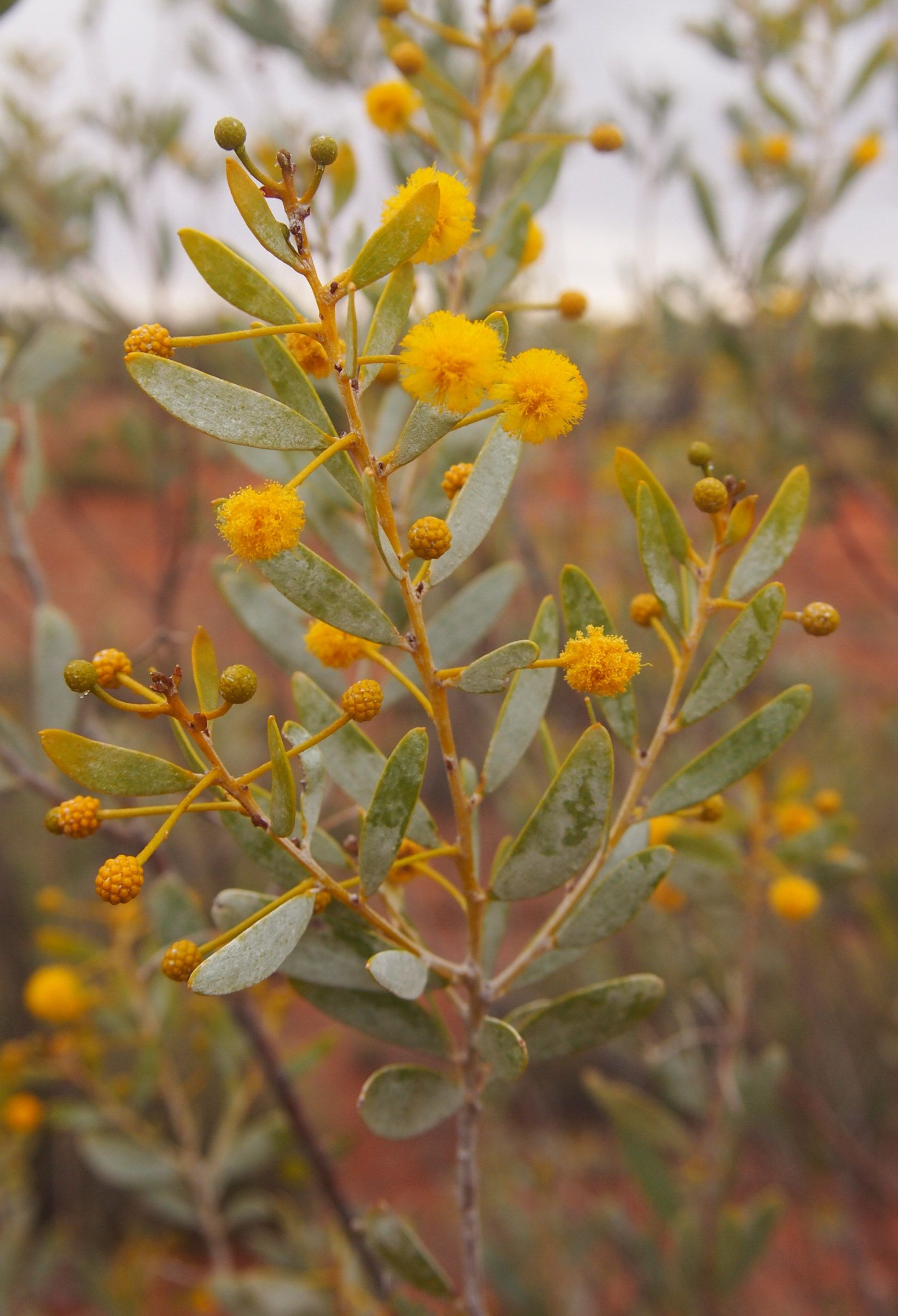
- Foliage and flowers

Scientific classification
- Kingdom: Plantae
- Clade: Tracheophytes
- Clade: Angiosperms
- Clade: Eudicots
- Clade: Rosids
- Order: Fabales
- Family: Fabaceae
- Subfamily: Caesalpinioideae
- Clade: Mimosoid clade
- Genus: Acacia
- Species: A. melleodora

Binomial name
- Acacia melleodora Pedley
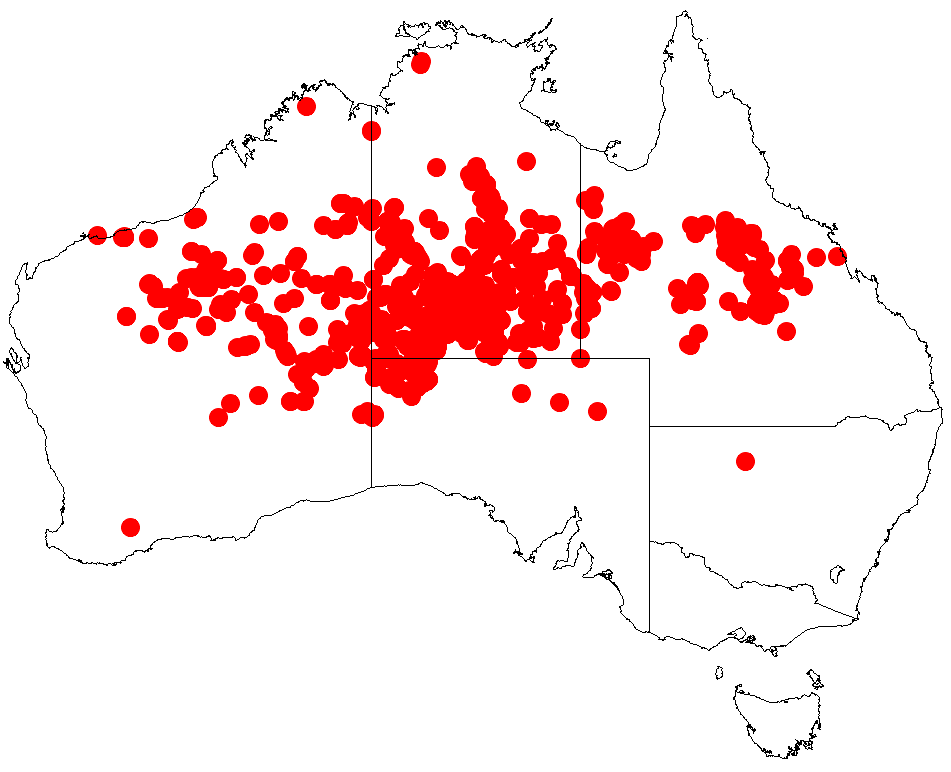
- Occurrence data from AVH

Synonyms
- Acacia meleodora K.A.W.Williams orth. var.; Racosperma melleodorum (Pedley) Pedley; Acacia dictyophleba auct. non F.Muell.: Whibley, D.J.E. & Symon, D.E. (1992)

= Acacia melleodora =

Species of plant

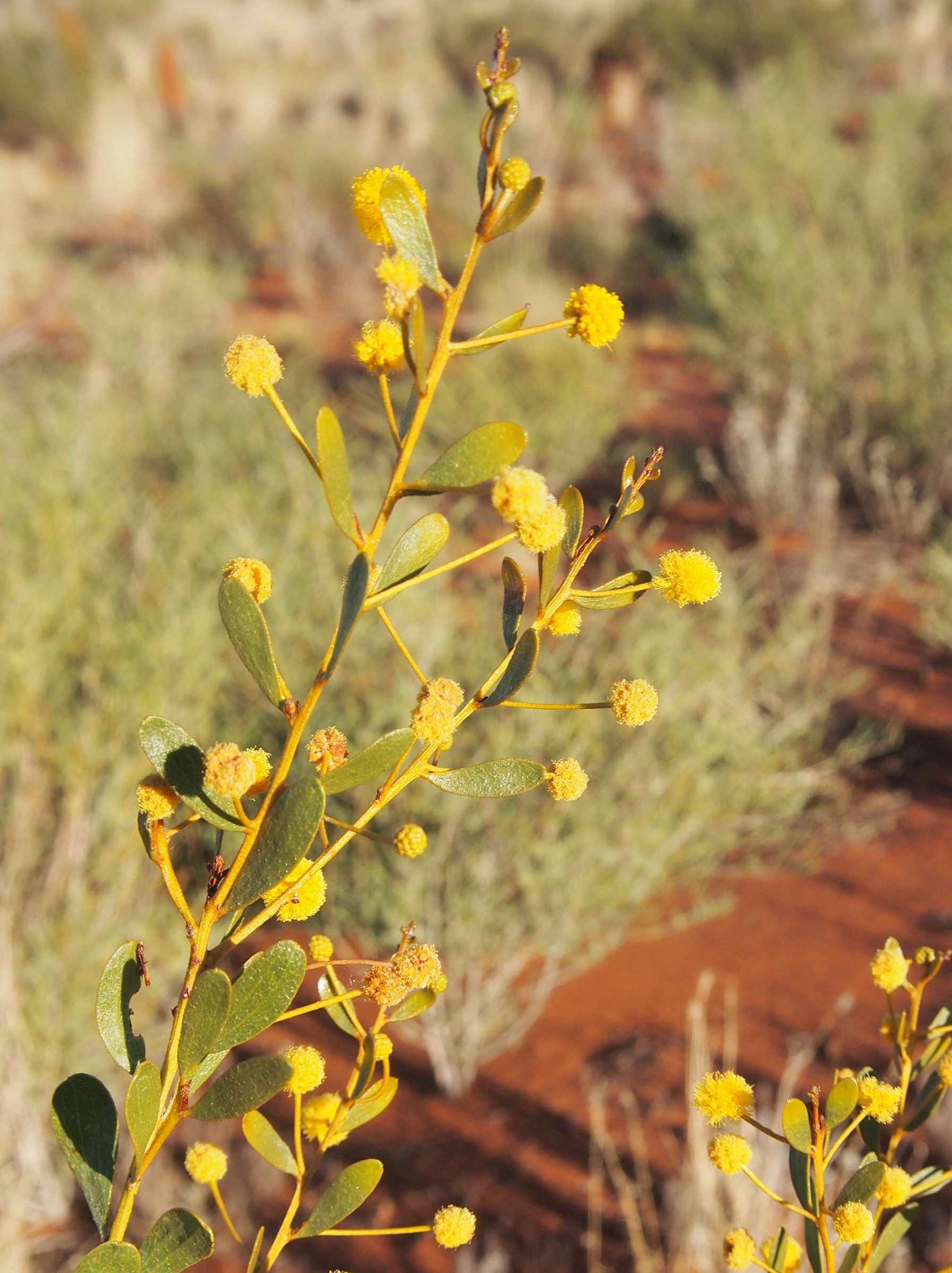
Flowers

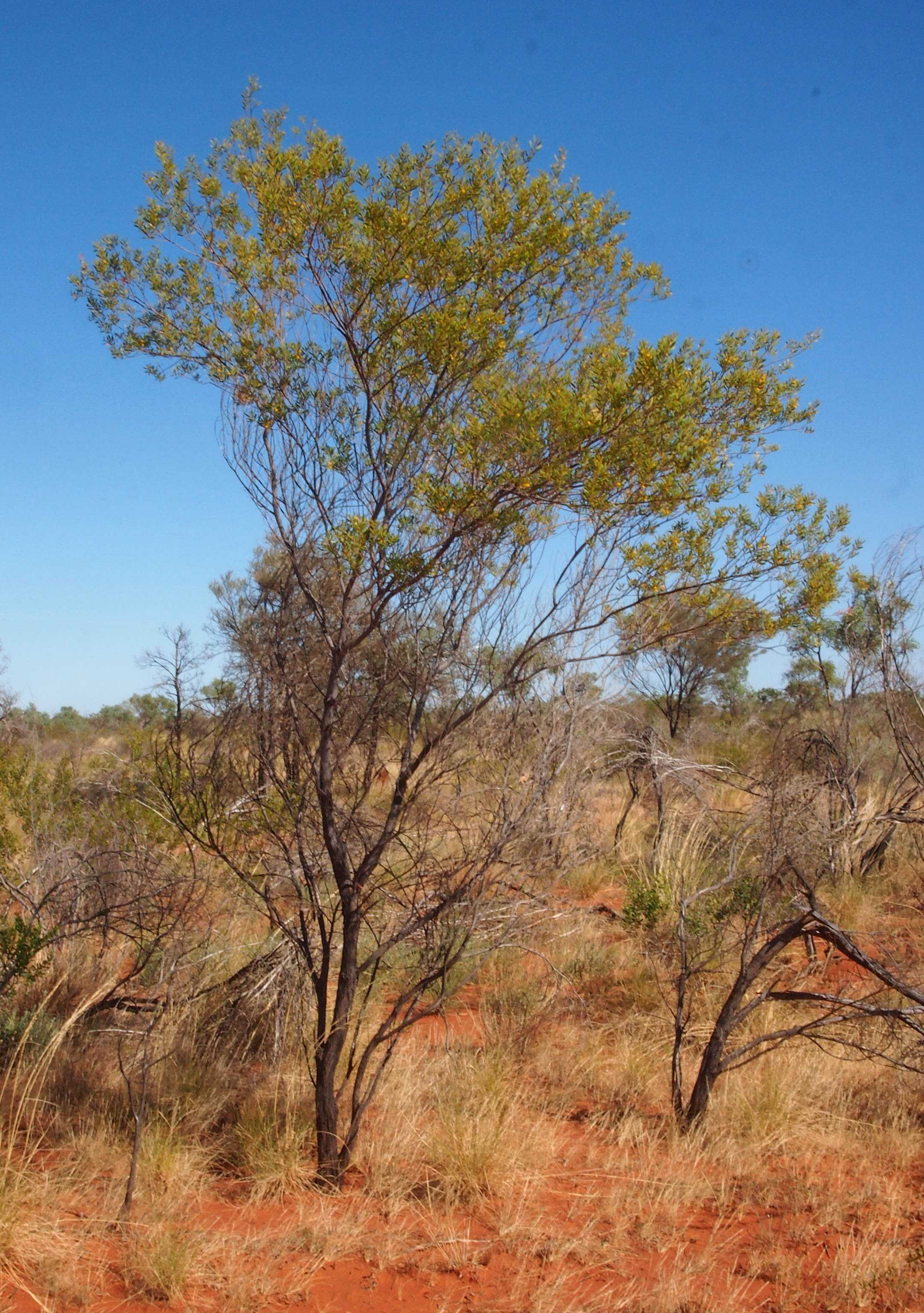
Habit

Acacia melleodora, commonly known as scented wax wattle, waxy wattle or honey wattle is a species of flowering plant in the family Fabaceae and is endemic to arid parts of inland Australia. It is a glabrous, resinous, sticky shrub egg-shaped to lance-shaped phyllodes with the narrower end towards the base, spherical or oblong heads of golden yellow flowers and oblong to narrowly oblong, firmly papery pods.

The plant is known in the indigenous Alyawarr language as alhanker or alhepalh, in Anmatyerr it is called lkwernarr or partwert, in Kaytetye – alhepalhe, patwerte or rewelarre, in Pitjantjatjara it is known as mintju or ngarlklya and in Warlpiri – matutu, marlarntarrpa patutu, pilpirrinpa or wurpardi.

== Description ==
Acacia melleodora is a glabrous, resinous, sticky, more or less 'v"-shaped or rounded shrub that typically grows to a height of 1–3 m (3 ft 3 in – 9 ft 10 in). The main stem divides at ground level into a few to many spreading to erect more or less main stems, the crown sparse to moderately dense. The bark is rough and dark grey at the base of older stems, otherwise smooth and light grey. The phyllodes are egg-shaped to lance-shaped with the narrower end towards the base, sometimes narrowly oblong, 15–40 mm (0.59–1.57 in) long, 4–10 mm (0.16–0.39 in) wide, leathery to thinly leathery, dull grey-green or glaucous, frequently with a whitish bloom, and with two or three prominent veins. The flowers are borne in up to three spherical or oblong heads on peduncles 10–20 mm (0.39–0.79 in) long. The heads are 10 mm (0.39 in) in diameter with 30 to 40 golden yellow flowers and have a faint resinous odour when fresh. Flowering occurs from about May to July, and the pods are oblong to narrowly oblong, up to 90 mm (3.5 in) long, 9–11 mm (0.35–0.43 in) wide, flat, firmly papery, often polished and stalked. The seeds are about 4 mm (0.16 in) long and have an aril.

Acacia melleodora has a life span of between two and ten years and produces seeds at an age of one to three years. Following bush fire the shrub can resprout epicormically or from the base where it has a lignotuber.

The phyllodes of A. melleodora superficially resemble those of A. montana, A. praemorsa and sometimes A. johnsonii. They also resemble A. orthotropica but the two species are not closely related.

== Taxonomy ==
Acacia melleodora was first formally described in 1987 by Leslie Pedley in the journal Austrobaileya from specimens collected in 1909, on the Charters Towers-Clermont Road, about 275 km (171 mi) from Charters Towers.

A. melleodora is closely related to A. dictyophleba, Acacia jensenii and Acacia sabulosa.

The specific epithet (melleodora) is taken from the Greek words meli meaning 'honey' and odor meaning 'smell', in reference to the distinctive honey perfume of the flowers.

== Distribution and habitat ==
Scented wax wattle occurs in the southern and central parts of the Northern Territory, the north western corner of South Australia, central Queensland and the Kimberley, Pilbara and Goldfields regions of Western Australia where it is found on dunes and sand plains growing in shallow stony, or red sandy soils, often around laterite. It is usually found in open Eucalypt woodland or spinifex communities.

== Uses ==
=== Use in horticulture ===
The plant is commercially available as seedlings or in seed form. Seeds have physical dormancy that must be overcome by nicking the seed coat, or treating it with hot water.

=== Indigenous use ===
Aborigines used the shrub to make toys, traps weapons and implements. The seeds and fruit flesh were used as a food source and the roots as a water source.

== See also ==
- List of Acacia species
