= Ngurlipartu =

Aboriginal Australian people

The Ngolibardu, otherwise written Ngulipartu, were an Aboriginal Australian people of Western Australia.

== Country ==
Norman Tindale (Note: Tindale's estimates particularly for the peoples of the Western desert are not considered to be accurate.) assigned the Ngolibardu a territorial domain of roughly 3,300 square miles (8,500 km^{2}). They were on the Rudall River, whose waters at Kalamilji were a final refuge in times of extreme drought. From the Rudall their land ran north as far as the Paterson Range. Their eastern frontier lay at Mount Broadhurst Range and Rooney Creek, while their western boundary was marked by the Throssell Range. These tribal lands were later taken over by the Kartudjara, moving up from the south, and the westward movement of the Nyangumarta to their north. On their western flank were the Wanman, and to their east lay the Nyamal.

== History ==
Traditions hold that the Ngolibardu's numbers were diminishing even before the period of contact with white colonialists. Apparently, the tribe was struck by a devastating "fever" sometime around the turn of the 19th-20th centuries, which killed off large numbers of their community, to the point of virtual extinction.

== Alternative names ==
- Tjilakurukuru (regional name for their country)

== Sources ==
- "AIATSIS map of Indigenous Australia". AIATSIS. 14 May 2024.
- "Tindale Tribal Boundaries" (PDF). Department of Aboriginal Affairs, Western Australia. September 2016. Archived from the original (PDF) on 8 March 2016.
- Tindale, Norman Barnett (1974). "Ngolibardu (WA)". Aboriginal Tribes of Australia: Their Terrain, Environmental Controls, Distribution, Limits, and Proper Names. Australian National University. ISBN 978-0-708-10741-6. Archived from the original on 20 March 2020.
- Tonkinson, Robert (1989). "Local Organisation and Land Tenure in the Karlamilyi (Rudall River) Region" (PDF). In Western Desert Working Group (ed.). The significance of the Karlamilyi Region to the Martujarra people of the Western Desert. Perth: Department of Conservation and Land Management. pp. 99–259.
