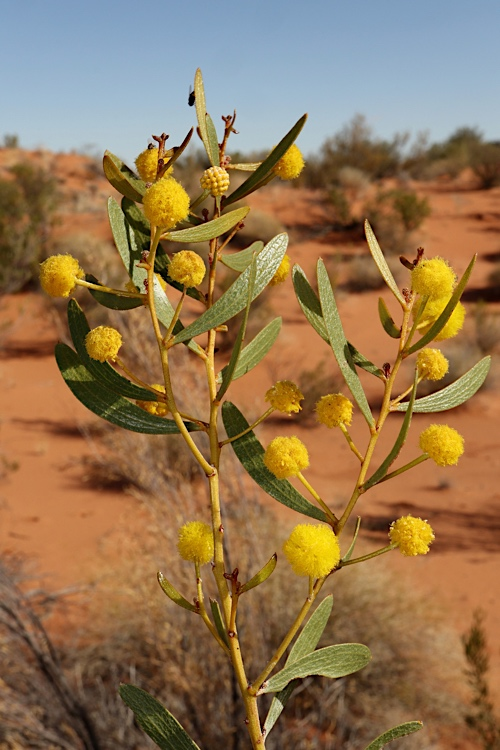

Scientific classification
- Kingdom: Plantae
- Clade: Tracheophytes
- Clade: Angiosperms
- Clade: Eudicots
- Clade: Rosids
- Order: Fabales
- Family: Fabaceae
- Subfamily: Caesalpinioideae
- Clade: Mimosoid clade
- Genus: Acacia
- Species: A. dictyophleba

Binomial name
- Acacia dictyophleba F.Muell.
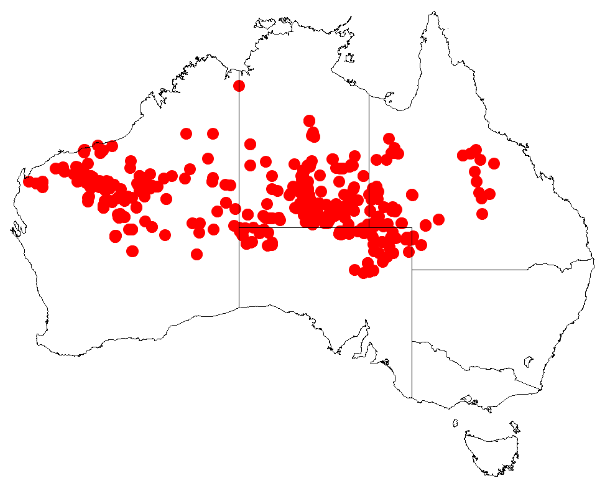
- Occurrence data from AVH

Synonyms
- Racosperma dictyophlebum (F.Muell.) Pedley; Acacia jensenii auct. non Maiden: Maslin, B.R. in Jessop, J.P. (ed.) (1981)

= Acacia dictyophleba =

Sandhill wattle

Species of plant

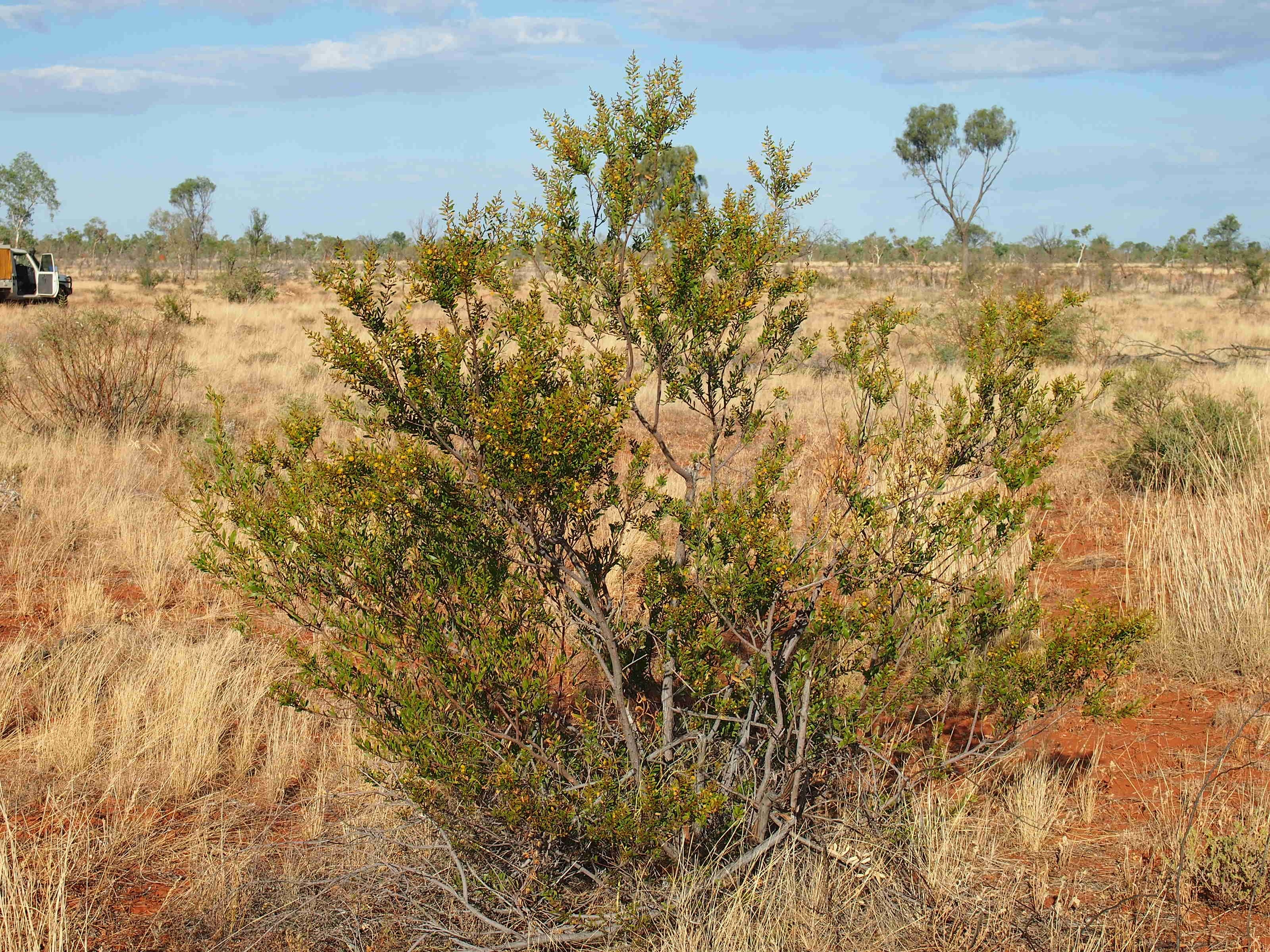
Habit east of Alice Springs

Acacia dictyophleba, also known as the sandhill wattle, waxy wattle, feather veined wattle, and spear tree, is a species of flowering plant in the family Fabaceae and is endemic to Australia. It is a glabrous, resinous shrub with lance-shaped phyllodes, spherical or oblong heads of golden yellow flowers and narrowly oblong, firmly leathery pods. The Nyangumarta peoples know the plant as langkur or lungkun; the Thalanyji know it as jabandi; and the Pintupi know it as mulyati.

== Description ==
Acacia dictyophleba is a glabrous, resinous, erect, compact to spreading shrub, but sometimes spindly and straggly, that typically grows to a height of 0.6–4.0 metres (2–13 ft). Its branchlets are often sparsely tuberculate. The phyllodes are lance-shaped with the narrower end towards the base, mostly 50–85 mm (2.0–3.3 in) long, 10–25 mm (0.39–0.98 in) wide and thickly leathery, dark green or grey-green or blue-grey with resin sometimes drying white. There are two or three prominent longitudinal veins with secondary veins forming a coarse open network on the phyllodes. The flowers are borne in up to three spherical or oblong heads in axils, on a peduncle 10–25 mm (0.39–0.98 in) long, each head 9–13 mm (0.35–0.51 in) in diameter when dry, with densely arranged 40 to 60 golden yellow flowers. Following occurs from March to September with a flush from May to early July. The pods are stalked, narrowly oblong, flat and raised over the seeds, up to 90 mm (3.5 in) long, 1.0–1.6 mm (0.039–0.063 in) wide, firmly papery and often with a polished surface. The seeds are about 4 mm (0.16 in) long with an aril.

== Taxonomy ==
Acacia dictyophleba was first formally described in 1863 by the botanist Ferdinand von Mueller in his Fragmenta Phytographiae Australiae, from specimens collected in central Australia by John McDouall Stuart near Mount Humphries in the Northern Territory.

The specific epithet (dictyophleba) is derived from the Greek words diktyon meaning 'net' and phlebo- meaning 'vein' referring to the minor veins of the phyllodes which form a coarse network.

A. dictyophleba is closely related to A.melleodora, A. jensenii and A. sabulosa.

== Distribution and habitat ==
Sandhill wattle is native to the desert areas of inland Australia, southern part of the Northern Territory, north-eastern South Australia and in southwest Queensland and Mid West regions of Western Australia. It is quite common throughout the Simpson Desert. It is found in a range of soil types including stony loam, sandy loam or clay-loam. The shrub is often part of in tall open shrubland or open low woodland communities containing various Acacias and Eucalyptus species as well as spinifex and grassland communities. Sometimes small dense regrowth stands following fire will form.

== Uses ==
The plant, also known by the name spear tree, is used to make spears and digging sticks by the Aboriginal people of the Little Sandy Desert.

The seeds are edible and the phyllodes can be chewed like tobacco. The phyllodes can be brewed to make tea which can be used to treat colds and headaches. The bark contains tannins and are astringent and can be used to treat diarrhoea and dysentery. The wood can be used as a fuel and to make fence posts.

A. dictyophleba has potential as an ornamental plant, with its impressive flowering and attractive foliage. It is also a fast-growing tree that is also nitrogen fixing as well as frost and drought tolerant.

== See also ==
- List of Acacia species
