= Acacia macraneura =

Scientific classification
- Kingdom: Plantae
- Clade: Tracheophytes
- Clade: Angiosperms
- Clade: Eudicots
- Clade: Rosids
- Order: Fabales
- Family: Fabaceae
- Subfamily: Caesalpinioideae
- Clade: Mimosoid clade
- Genus: Acacia
- Species: A. macraneura

Binomial name
- Acacia macraneura Maslin & J.E.Reid
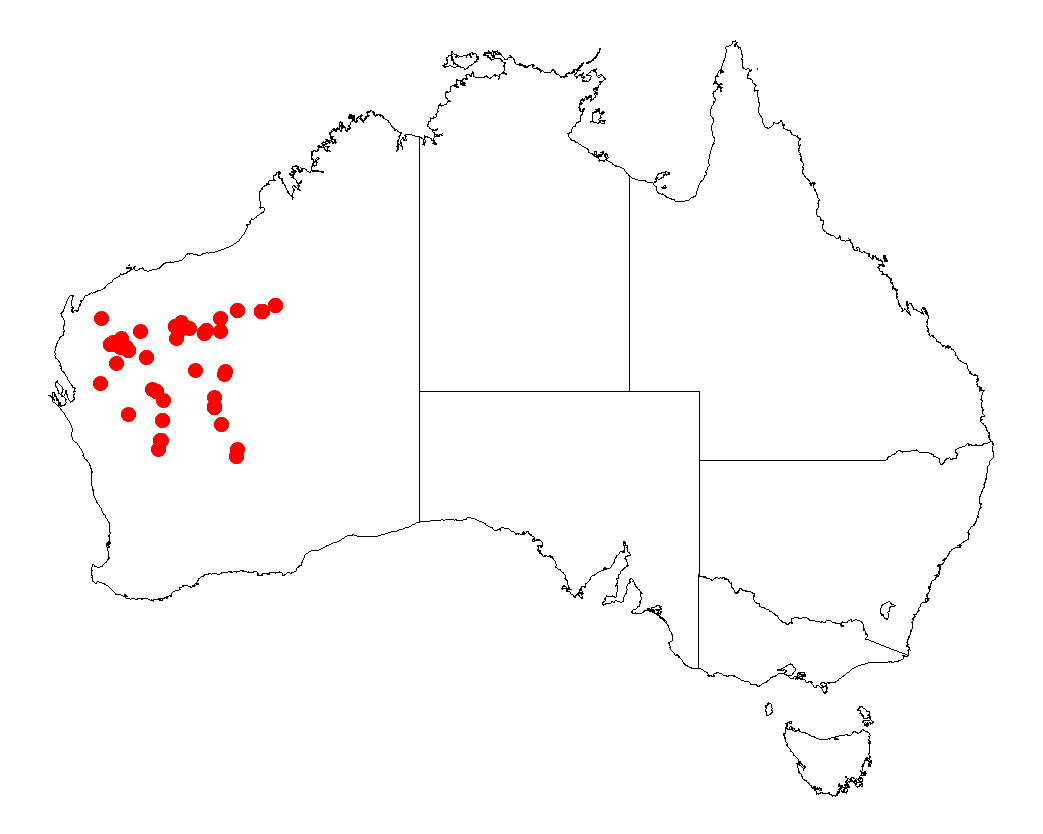

Synonyms
- Acacia aneura var. macrocarpa Randell; Racosperma aneurum var. macrocarpum (Randell) Pedley

Species of legume

Acacia macraneura, commonly known as big pod mulga or big mac mulga, is a species of flowering plant in the family Fabaceae and is endemic to arid areas of Western Australia. It is a spreading, multi-stemmed shrub, sometimes an inverted cone-shape shrub, with stems and branches somewhat crooked, curved to s-shaped or winding phyllodes, spikes of yellow flowers, and oblong to narrowly oblong, thinly leathery pods slightly to obviously rounded over the seeds.

== Description ==
Acacia macraneura is a spreading, multi-stemmed shrub that typically grows to a height of 2–5 m (6 ft 7 in – 16 ft 5 in) sometimes an inverted cone-shaped tree 4–7 m (13–23 ft) high, with stems and branches often somewhat crooked. Its branchlets are covered with soft, minute hairs pressed against the surface and often have obscure ribs and a layer of translucent resin. The phyllodes are crooked, curved to s-shaped or winding, 40–70 mm (1.6–2.8 in) long, 0.8–1.1 mm (0.031–0.043 in) in diameter with many longitudinal veins and a gland up to 3 mm (0.12 in) above the pulvinus. The flowers are yellow and borne in spikes 10–20 mm (0.39–0.79 in) long on more or less glabrous peduncles 5–15 mm (0.20–0.59 in) long. Flowering has been recorded in April, May, July and August, and the pods are oblong to narrowly oblong, mostly 20–70 mm (0.79–2.76 in) long, 12–22 mm (0.47–0.87 in) wide, thinly leathery, flat or wavy, glabrous, resinous and slightly to obviously rounded over the seeds. The seeds are oblong to elliptic or round, 7–9.5 mm (0.28–0.37 in) long, 5–7 mm (0.20–0.28 in) wide with a small aril.

== Taxonomy ==
Acacia macraneura was first formally described in 2012 by Bruce Maslin and Jordan E. Reid in the journal Nuytsia from specimens collected 48 km (30 mi) south of the Kumarina Roadhouse on the Great Northern Highway to Meekatharra in 2007. The specific epithet (macraneura) means 'large pod'.

== Distribution and habitat ==
Big pod mulga grows in clay or loam associated with calcrete, often on floodplains or in shallow drainage systems in mulga with a ground cover, including grasses. It is confined to the Carnarvon, Gascoyne, Great Sandy Desert, Little Sandy Desert, Murchison and Pilbara bioregions of Western Australia. It has a scattered distribution from around Mount Magnet to near Leonora and the Rudall River catchment. There is also a population on Mount Agnes in South Australia, near the border with Western Australia.

== See also ==
- List of Acacia species
