= Goodenia hartiana =

Hart's goodenia

Conservation status
- Priority Two — Poorly Known Taxa (DEC)

Scientific classification
- Kingdom: Plantae
- Clade: Tracheophytes
- Clade: Angiosperms
- Clade: Eudicots
- Clade: Asterids
- Order: Asterales
- Family: Goodeniaceae
- Genus: Goodenia
- Species: G. hartiana

Binomial name
- Goodenia hartiana L.W.Sage

Species of plant

Goodenia hartiana, commonly known as Hart's goodenia, is a species of flowering plant in the family Goodeniaceae and is endemic to Western Australia. It is an erect to spreading perennial herb or subshrub with lance-shaped to egg-shaped leaves with the narrower end towards the base, racemes of blue or purple flowers and oval to cylindrical fruit.

== Description ==
Goodenia hartiana is an erect to spreading perennial herb or subshrub that typically grows to a height of 50 cm (20 in) with its stems covered with minute glandular hairs. The leaves are mostly near the base of the plant, lance-shaped to egg-shaped with the narrower end towards the base, 6–30 mm (0.24–1.18 in) long and 2.5–7 mm (0.098–0.276 in) wide. The flowers are arranged in racemes up to 125 mm (4.9 in) long on a peduncle 3–7 mm (0.12–0.28 in) long with leaf-like bracts, each flower on a pedicel 1–2 mm (0.039–0.079 in) long. The sepals are narrow egg-shaped to lance-shaped, 5.2–6 mm (0.20–0.24 in) long and the corolla is blue or purple, 10–17 mm (0.39–0.67 in) long. The lower lobes of the corolla are 5–6 mm (0.20–0.24 in) long with wings 2.5–3 mm (0.098–0.118 in) wide. Flowering has been observed in August and September and the fruit is an oval to cylindrical capsule up to 6 mm (0.24 in) long.

== Taxonomy and naming ==
Goodenia hartiana was first formally described in 2006 by Leigh William Sage in the journal Nuytsia from specimens collected in the Rudall River region by Raymond P. Hart in 1992. The specific epithet (hartiana) honours the collector of the type material.

== Distribution and habitat ==
Hart's goodenia grows on sand dunes in the Little Sandy Desert, Great Sandy Desert and Pilbara biogeographic regions of Western Australia.

== Conservation status ==
Goodenia hartiana is classified as "Priority Two" by the Western Australian Government Department of Parks and Wildlife meaning that it is poorly known and from only one or a few locations.
