= Eucalyptus rowleyi =

Conservation status
- Priority Three — Poorly Known Taxa (DEC)

Scientific classification
- Kingdom: Plantae
- Clade: Tracheophytes
- Clade: Angiosperms
- Clade: Eudicots
- Clade: Rosids
- Order: Myrtales
- Family: Myrtaceae
- Genus: Eucalyptus
- Species: E. rowleyi

Binomial name
- Eucalyptus rowleyi Nicolle & M.E.French

Species of eucalyptus

Eucalyptus rowleyi is a species of mallee that is endemic to the Pilbara region of Western Australia. It has smooth grey bark, lance-shaped adult leaves, flower buds in groups of seven or nine, white flowers and cylindrical to urn-shaped fruit.

== Description ==
Eucalyptus rowleyi is a mallee that grows to a height of 3–5 m (9.8–16.4 ft) and forms a lignotuber. The bark is smooth grey to tan, and cream-coloured when new. The leaves on young plants and on coppice regrowth are dull bluish green, egg-shaped, up to 100 mm (3.9 in) long and 60 mm (2.4 in) wide. Adult leaves are lance-shaped to broadly lance-shaped, mostly 80–145 mm (3.1–5.7 in) long and 25–45 mm (0.98–1.77 in) wide. The flower buds are borne in groups of seven or nine on a thickened peduncle 5–22 mm (0.20–0.87 in) long, the individual flowers on pedicels 2–6 mm (0.079–0.236 in) long. Mature buds are club-shaped, 3–5 mm (0.12–0.20 in) wide with a conical operculum 2–4 mm (0.079–0.157 in) long. The flowers are white and the fruit are cylindrical to urn-shaped, 6–10 mm (0.24–0.39 in) long and 5–8 mm (0.20–0.31 in) wide.

== Taxonomy and naming ==
Eucalyptus rowleyi was first formally described in 2012 by Dean Nicolle and Malcolm E. French from material collected north of Newman by Ian Brooker in 1983. The description was published in the journal Nuytsia. The specific epithet (rowleyi) honours Bruce Rowley, an expert desert traveller who first discovered the Little Sandy Desert population of this species.

== Distribution and habitat ==
This mallee usually grows on broad floodplains or in open mallee vegetation. It is only known from the area between Marble Bar, Newman and the Rudall River National Park in the Little Sandy Desert and Pilbara biogeographic regions.

== Conservation status ==
This mallee is classified as "Priority Three" by the Western Australian Government Department of Parks and Wildlife meaning that it is poorly known and known from only a few locations but is not under imminent threat.

== See also ==
- List of Eucalyptus species
