= Sandhill wattle =

Sandhill wattle is a common name for several flowering plants and may refer to:

- Acacia burkittii
- Acacia dictyophleba
- Acacia ligulata, native to Australia
