= Kumpupintil Lake =

Lake in Western Australia

Lake Disappointment
- Kumpupintil (Martu)
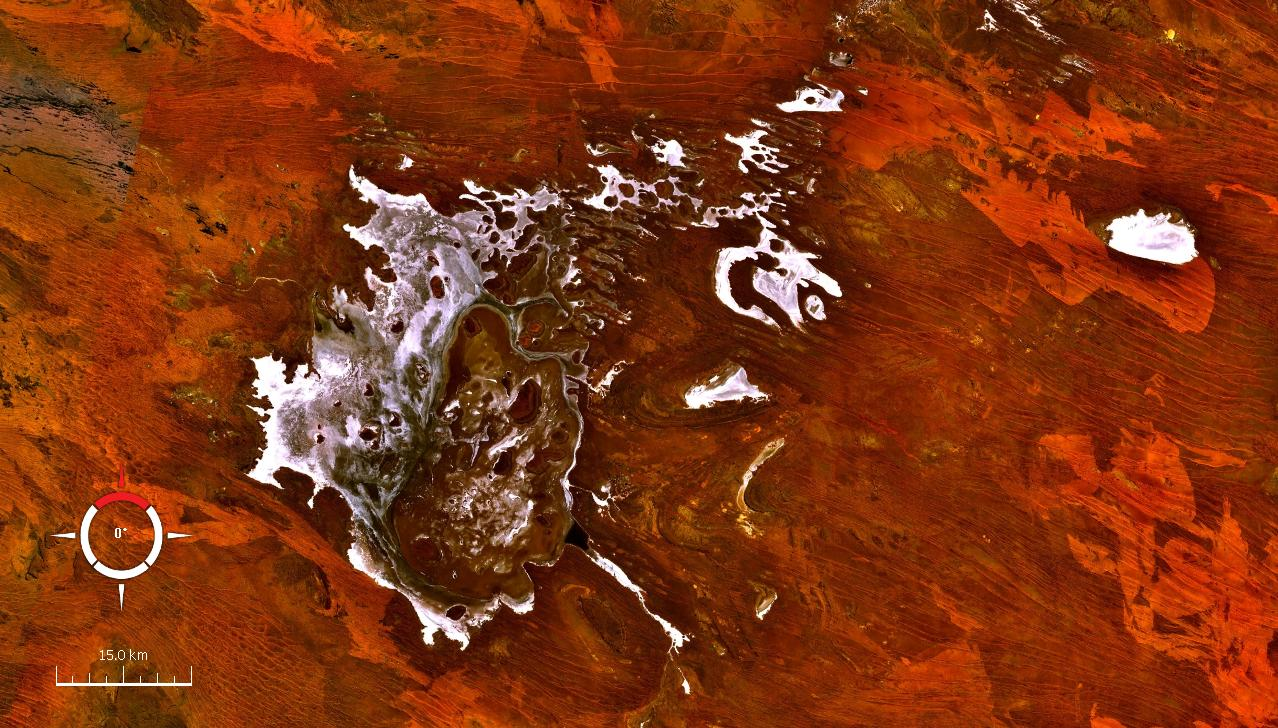
- Landsat image; screen capture from NASA World Wind

- Location within Western Australia
- Interactive map of Lake Disappointment
- Location: Western Australia
- Coordinates: 23°30′S 122°50′E
- Lake type: Endorheic salt lake
- Basin countries: Australia
- Max. length: 160 km (99 mi)
- Surface area: 330 km^{2} (130 sq mi)
- Surface elevation: 325 metres (1,066 ft)

Kumpupintil Lake (goom-bu-pin-dil), formerly known as Lake Disappointment, is an endorheic salt lake in the Little Sandy Desert, in the Pilbara region of Western Australia.

== Description ==
Kumpupintil Lake is about 160 kilometres (99 mi) long and located 300 kilometres (190 mi) east of Newman.

The 33,000-hectare (82,000-acre) lake typically is dry, except during very wet periods such as the 1900 floods and in many recent tropical wet seasons since 1967. It lies on the Tropic of Capricorn, due east of the mining town of Newman and the Jigalong Community. It is at the northern side of the Little Sandy Desert and south of the Karlamilyi National Park. The Canning Stock Route passes down the western shores of the lake and the surrounds consist mostly of sand dunes. Its elevation is 325 metres (1066 ft) above mean sea level.

The lake is important to Martu people for spiritual and ceremonial reasons, as well as being an important place for water and traditional food.

The lake is home to many species of water birds. The discovery of a new species of dragon lizard, Ctenophorus nguyarna, at the site was announced in 2007.

== Mythology ==
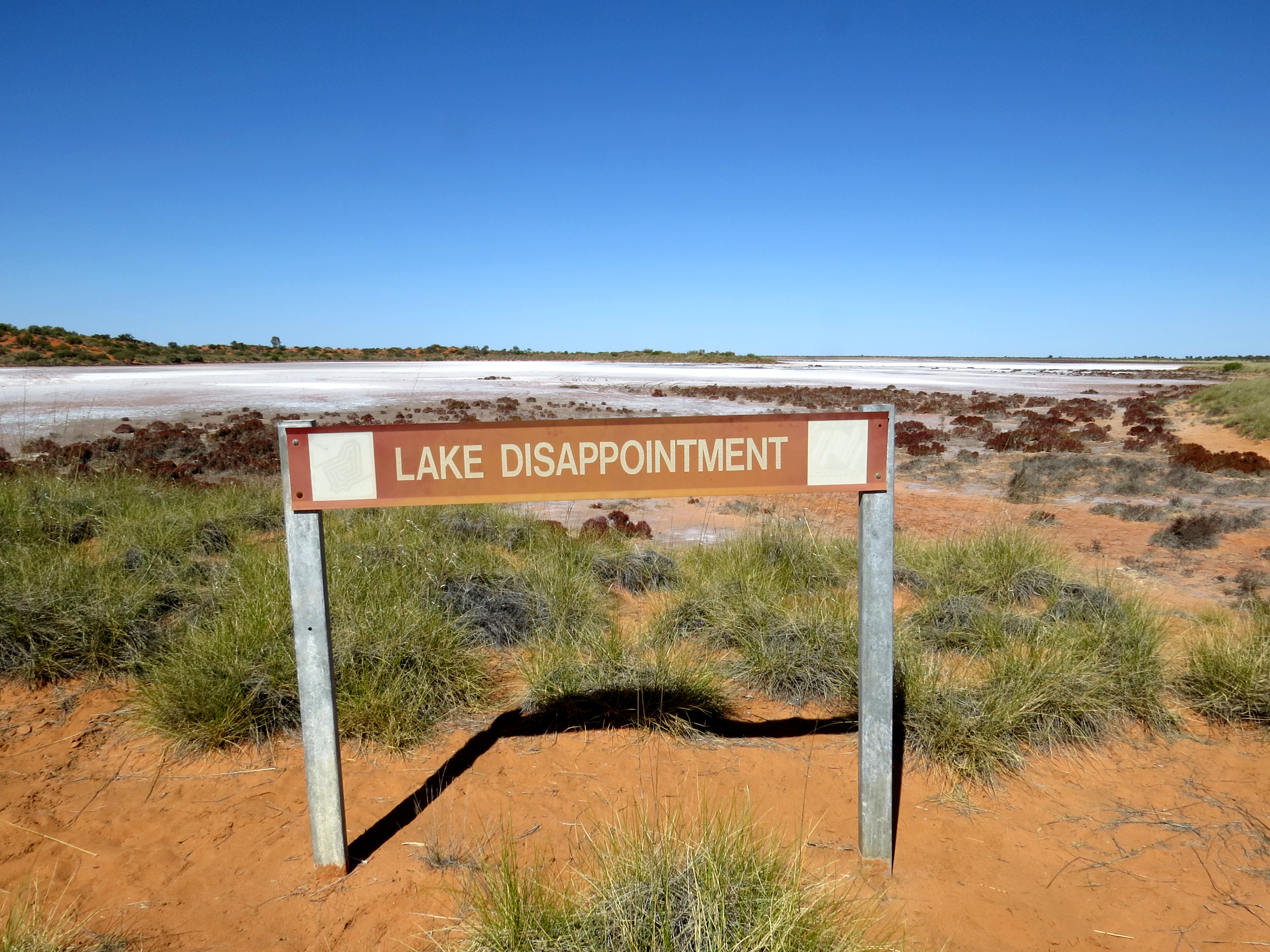
Kumpupintil Lake, then officially known as Lake Disappointment, photographed in 2015

In indigenous culture, Kumpupintil was off-limits to the tribes neighbouring the area, such as the Kurajarra, Wanman, Kartudjara and the Putidjara. The reason for the taboo, existing down to modern times, derives from the lake's mythological associations with the Ngayurnangalku spirits thought to live below its surface. This prohibition extended to flying over the area, since the Ngayurnangalku, ancestral cannibal beings with pointy teeth and clawlike fingernails, are deemed capable of attacking even planes that intrude over the lake's airspace.

The Aboriginal people told a story about how the Ngayurnangalku were split into the "good" and the "bad" over a debate on whether or not they should continue to eat people. One group decided that they would stop participating in cannibalism and were only kept safe by "bodyguards". The other group continued to follow cannibalism. Aboriginal stockmen would muffle their horses' bells so that they would not alert the cannibals to their presence when they approached the lake.

== Name ==
The lake known, to the Western Desert Martu people as Kumpupintil, was named Lake Disappointment by the explorer Frank Hann in 1897. Hann was in the area exploring the east Pilbara, around Rudall River. He noticed creeks in the area flowed inland, and followed them, expecting to find a large fresh water lake. The lake was typically dry and so was named Lake Disappointment. (Note: "It was left to Frank Hann in the course of an exploring/prospecting expedition travelling east from Nullagine to sight and name the lake on 20 April 1897. Hann had travelled from Nullagine across the Davis River to the Coolbro Creek, then to the southeast following and naming the Broadhurst Range, crossing the upper Rudall River and the Cotton Creek as far as the Harbutt Range where he turned south to the Mckay Range. Here to the southward he sighted a large lake ten miles distant, and they made their way to it next day, but 'found it was all white salt ... it is the largest thing in lakes I ever saw ... I shall call the lake Lake Disappointment as I was disappointed in not finding water in it.")

On November 11, 2020, "Kumpupintil Lake" was formally approved by the Western Australian government agency Landgate as the official name, following a request from the traditional owners and the Western Desert Lands Aboriginal Corporation.

The name "Kumpupintil" describes how the lake was made and is linked to a Martu creation story where Martu warriors fought mighty giants in an epic battle.

== See also ==
- List of lakes of Australia § Western Australia

== Sources ==
- "Lake Disappointment formally renamed Kumpupintil Lake". Government of Western Australia Media Statements. 11 November 2020. Archived from the original on 14 August 2022.
- Beard, J. S. (2005). "Drainage Evolution in the Lake Disappointment Catchment, Western Australia" (PDF). Journal of the Royal Society of Western Australia. 88: 57–64. Archived from the original (PDF) on 3 March 2023.
- Doughty, Paul; Maryan, Brad; Melville, Jane; Austin, Jeremy (2007). "A new species of Ctenophorus (Lacertilia Agamidae) from Lake Disappointment, Western Australia" (PDF). Herpetologica. 63 (1): 72–56. doi:10.1655/0018-0831(2007)63[72:ANSOCL]2.0.CO;2. S2CID 86297349.
- "Gibson desert". National Geographic Society. 2001. Archived from the original on 8 March 2010.
- Nicholls, Christine Judith (29 April 2014). "'Dreamings' and place – Aboriginal monsters and their meanings". The Conversation.
- Rothwell, Nicolas (2003). Wings of the Kite-Hawk: A Journey Into the Heart of Australia. Black. ISBN 978-1-863-95445-7.
- Tonkinson, Robert (1989). "Local Organisation and Land Tenure in the Karlamilyi (Rudall River) Region" (PDF). In Western Desert Working Group (ed.). The significance of the Karlamilyi Region to the Martujarra people of the Western Desert. Perth: Department of Conservation and Land Management. pp. 99–259.
- Wilson, Steve (2012). Australian Lizards: A Natural History. Csiro Publishing. ISBN 978-0-643-10642-0.
