= Acacia jamesiana =

Scientific classification
- Kingdom: Plantae
- Clade: Embryophytes
- Clade: Tracheophytes
- Clade: Spermatophytes
- Clade: Angiosperms
- Clade: Eudicots
- Clade: Rosids
- Order: Fabales
- Family: Fabaceae
- Subfamily: Caesalpinioideae
- Clade: Mimosoid clade
- Genus: Acacia
- Species: A. jamesiana

Binomial name
- Acacia jamesiana Maslin
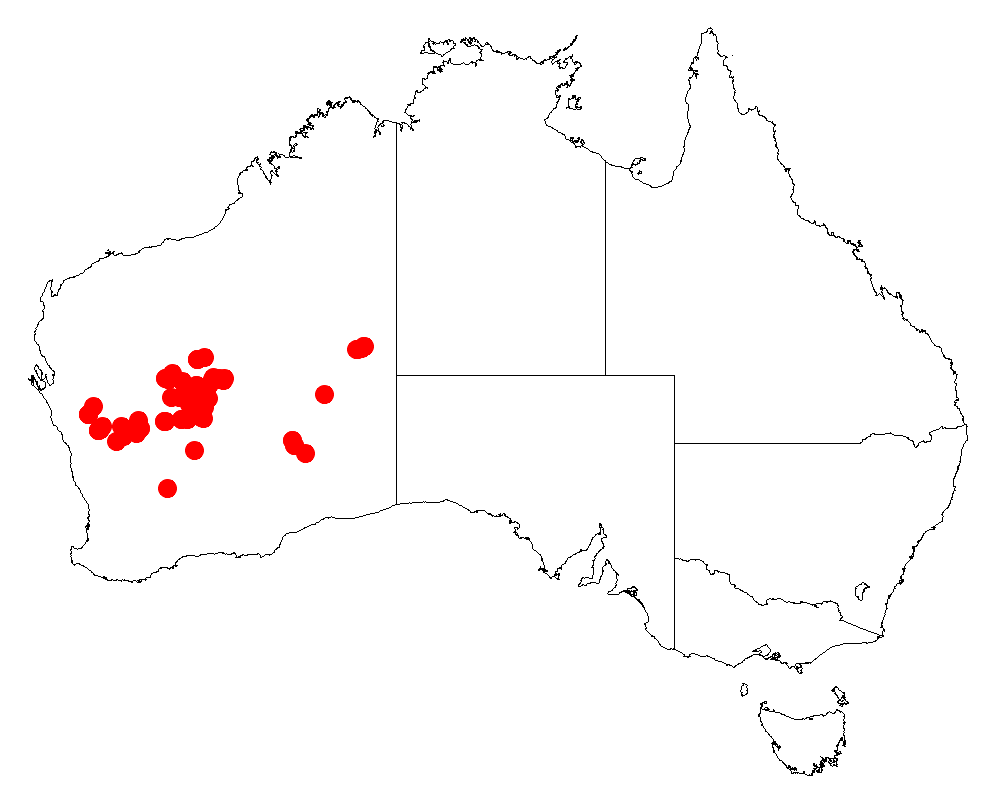
- Occurrence data from AVH

Synonyms
- Racosperma jamesianum (Maslin) Pedley

Species of legume

Acacia jamesiana is a species of flowering plant in the family Fabaceae and is endemic to inland areas of Western Australia. It is a bushy shrub or tree with linear to rhombic phyllodes with a coarsely pointed tip, oblong to short-cylindrical heads of golden yellow flowers and linear, ribbed, straight, cartilaginous to more or less woody pods.

== Description ==
Acacia jamesiana is a bushy tree or shrub that typically grows to a height of 2–6 m (6 ft 7 in – 19 ft 8 in) and has resinous new shoots, its branchlets sparsely covered with silky, silvery hairs. Its phyllodes are ascending to suberect, usually linear to rhombic in cross section, rigid, 80–220 mm (3.1–8.7 in) long, 1.0–1.5 mm (0.039–0.059 in) wide and sometimes have a sharply pointed tip. The flowers are borne in an oblong to short-cylindrical head on a silky peduncle 2–10 mm (0.079–0.394 in) long, the heads 9–12 mm (0.35–0.47 in) long and 6–8 mm (0.24–0.31 in) in diameter with dense golden yellow flowers. Flower has been recorded from March to December, and the pods are linear, straight, up to 120 mm (4.7 in) long, 4 mm (0.16 in) wide and cartilaginous to subwoody. The seeds are elliptic to oblong, 5.0–5.5 mm (0.20–0.22 in) long and glossy dark brown with an aril.

== Taxonomy ==
Acacia jamesiana was first formally described in 1980 by Bruce Maslin in the Journal of the Adelaide Botanic Gardens from specimens collected by Alex George north-east of Wiluna in 1963. The specific epithet (jamesiana) honours James Hamlyn Willis.

== Distribution and habitat ==
This species of wattle grows on sand dunes and plains, mostly in tall open shrubland in scattered places between Yalgoo, the Carnarvon Range and Leinster with outliers in the Gibson and Great Victoria Deserts in the Central Ranges, Coolgardie, Gascoyne, Gibson Desert, Great Victoria Desert, Little Sandy Desert Murchison and Yalgoo bioregions of inland Western Australia.

== Conservation status ==
Acacia jamesiana is listed as 'not threatened' by the Government of Western Australia Department of Parks and Wildlife.

== See also ==
- List of Acacia species
