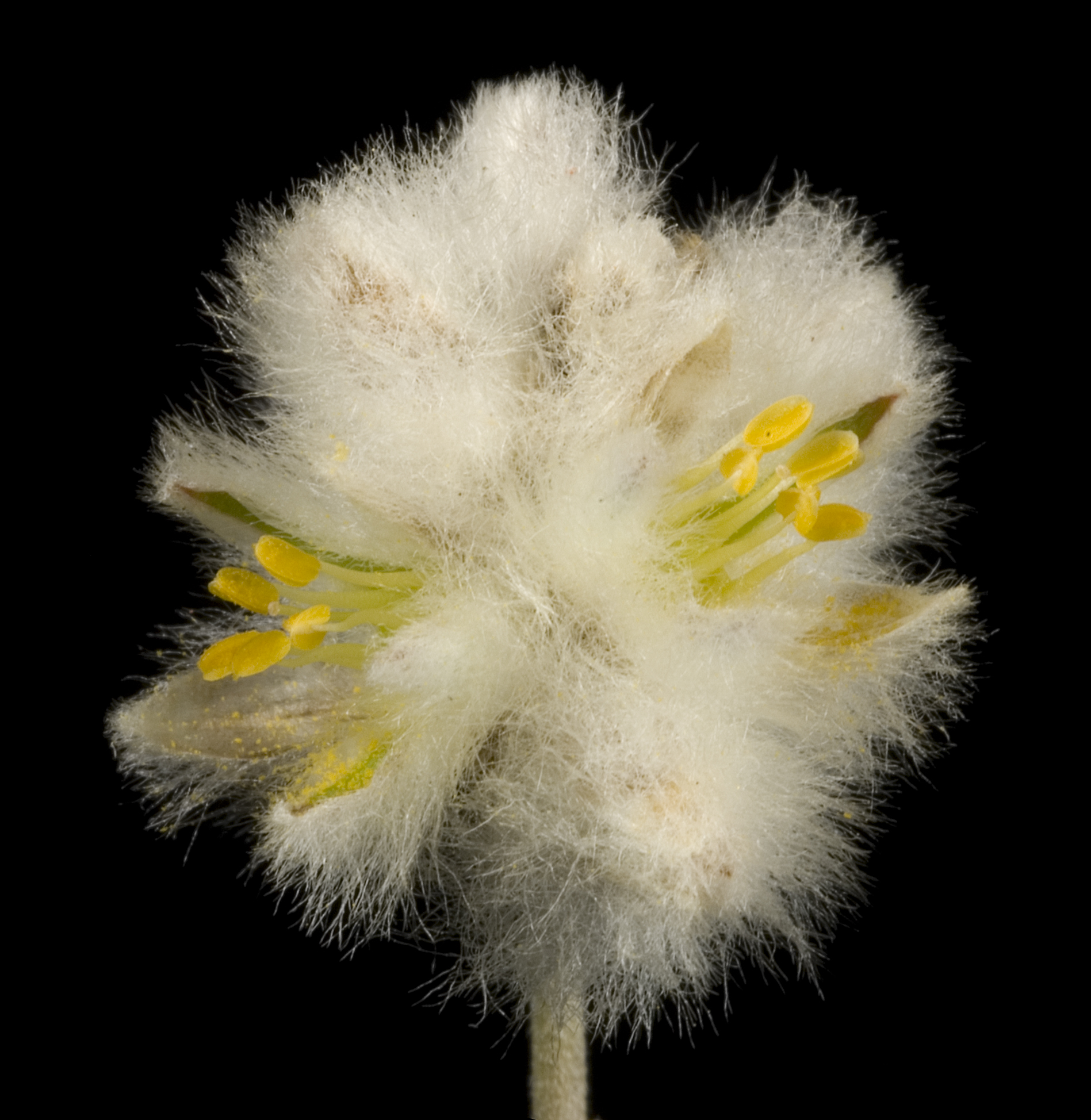

Scientific classification
- Kingdom: Plantae
- Clade: Tracheophytes
- Clade: Angiosperms
- Clade: Eudicots
- Order: Caryophyllales
- Family: Amaranthaceae
- Genus: Ptilotus
- Species: P. albidus

Binomial name
- Ptilotus albidus (C.A.Gardner) Benl

Synonyms
- Trichinium albidum C.A.Gardner

= Ptilotus albidus =

Species of grass-like plant

Ptilotus albidus is a species of flowering plant in the family Amaranthaceae and is endemic to inland Western Australia. It is a compact perennial shrub with linear leaves, spherical spikes of white flowers and dull brown seeds.

== Description ==
Ptilotus albidus is a compact perennial shrub that typically grows to 20–60 cm (7.9–23.6 in) high. Its leaves are greyish-green, linear, 3–14 mm (0.12–0.55 in) long and 1–2 mm (0.039–0.079 in) wide. The flowers are white, borne in dense, spherical or oval spikes of seven to ten, 10–22 mm (0.39–0.87 in) long and 10–16 mm (0.39–0.63 in) wide. There are hairy bracts 1.5–2.5 mm (0.059–0.098 in) long and hairy bracteoles 3.3–4.5 mm (0.13–0.18 in) long at the base of the flowers. The outer tepals are 6.8–9.5 mm (0.27–0.37 in) long and the inner tepals 6.3–9 mm (0.25–0.35 in) long. Flowering occurs from May to November and the seeds are 2.2–2.4 mm (0.087–0.094 in) long and dull brown.

== Taxonomy ==
This species was first formally described in 1943 by Charles Gardner, who gave it the name Trichinium albidum in the Journal of the Royal Society of Western Australia from specimens he collected between Meekatharra and Wiluna. In 1962, Gerhard Benl transferred the species to Ptilotus as P. albidus. The specific epithet (albidus) means 'white', referring to the flowers.

== Distribution and habitat ==
Ptilotus albidus grows on stony soils on breakaways and clay plains in the Gascoyne, Little Sandy Desert and Murchison bioregions of inland Western Australia.

== Conservation status ==
This species of Ptilotus is listed as "not threatened" by the Government of Western Australia Department of Biodiversity, Conservation and Attractions.

== See also ==
- List of Ptilotus species
