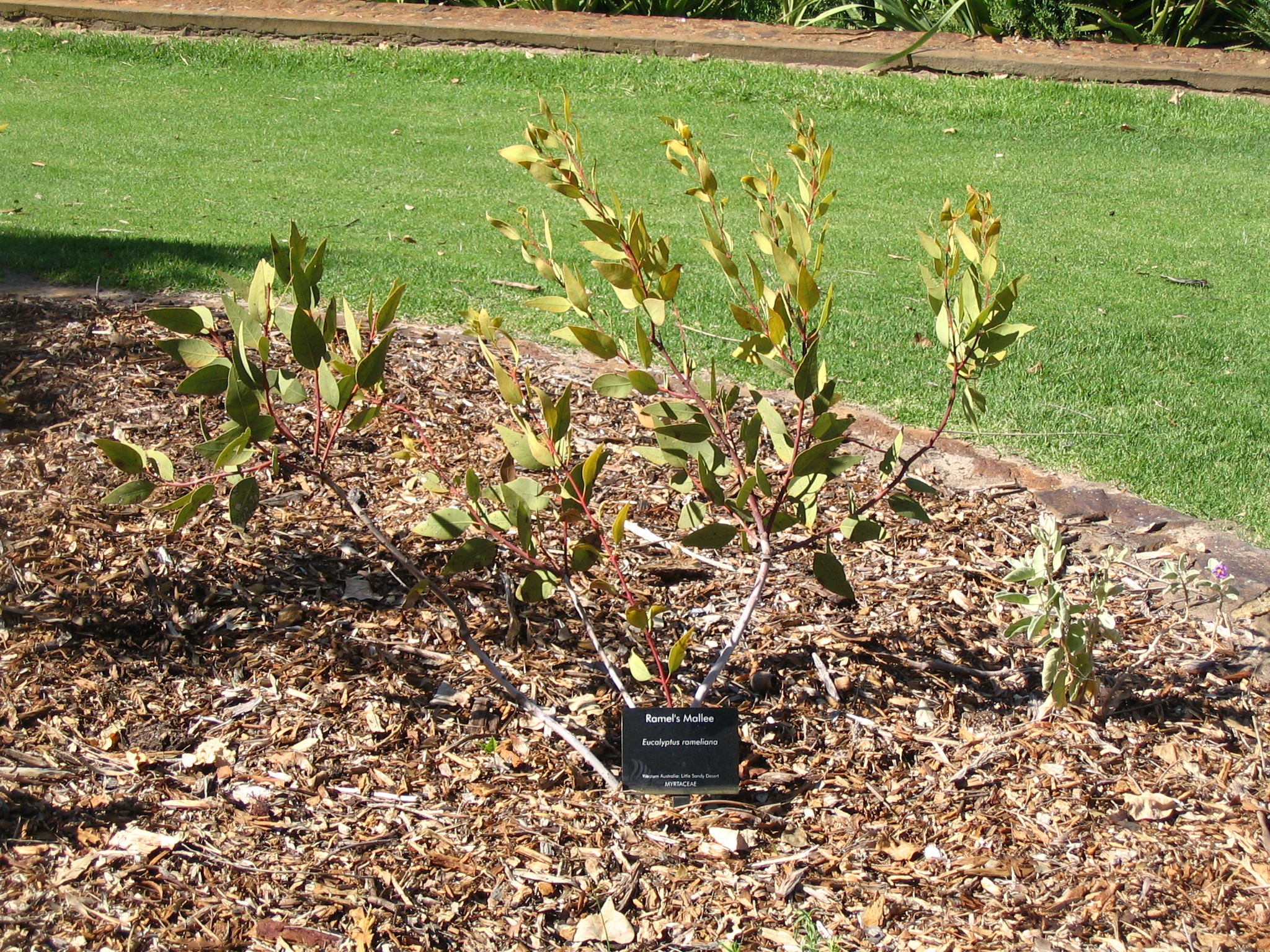
- Immature specimen in Kings Park

Scientific classification
- Kingdom: Plantae
- Clade: Tracheophytes
- Clade: Angiosperms
- Clade: Eudicots
- Clade: Rosids
- Order: Myrtales
- Family: Myrtaceae
- Genus: Eucalyptus
- Species: E. rameliana

Binomial name
- Eucalyptus rameliana F.Muell.

Synonyms
- Eucalyptus pyriformis var. rameliana (F.Muell.) Maiden

= Eucalyptus rameliana =

Ramel's mallee

Species of eucalyptus

Eucalyptus rameliana, commonly known as Ramel's mallee, is a species of low growing mallee that is endemic to desert areas of central Western Australia. It has smooth bark, broadly lance-shaped to egg-shaped adult leaves, flower buds arranged singly in leaf axils, pale yellow flowers and flattened, pyramid-shaped fruit.

== Description ==
Eucalyptus rameliana is a mallee that typically grows to a height of 1–3 m (3 ft 3 in – 9 ft 10 in) and forms a lignotuber. It has smooth greyish to brown bark. The adult leaves are the same shade of dull green on both sides, egg-shaped to broadly lance-shaped, 50–110 mm (2.0–4.3 in) long and 23–50 mm (0.91–1.97 in) wide on a petiole 10–25 mm (0.39–0.98 in) long. The flower buds are arranged singly in leaf axils, sometimes in groups of three, on a down-turned peduncle 7–17 mm (0.28–0.67 in) long, the individual buds on pedicels 5–12 mm (0.20–0.47 in) long. Mature buds are oval to spherical, 25–37 mm (0.98–1.46 in) long and 15–27 mm (0.59–1.06 in) wide with a conical, or rounded and beaked operculum. Flowering mainly occurs from May to June and the flowers are usually pale yellow, sometimes red. The fruit is a woody, flattened pyramid capsule 12–17 mm (0.47–0.67 in) long and 23–35 mm (0.91–1.38 in) wide with the valves protruding slightly. The seeds are grey brown, flattened pyramid-shaped, 2.5–4.5 mm (0.098–0.177 in) long.

== Taxonomy ==
Eucalyptus rameliana was first formally described in 1876 by the botanist Ferdinand von Mueller his book, Fragmenta Phytographiae Australiae. The species was named in honour of Prospero Ramel who had introduced different species of Eucalypts into Algeria and southern France.

== Distribution ==
Ramel's mallee is only known from the Little Sandy Desert south-east of Newman where it grows on sand dunes and swales.

== Conservation status ==
This eucalypt is classified as "not threatened" by the Western Australian Government Department of Parks and Wildlife.

== See also ==
- List of Eucalyptus species
