= Matuwa Kurrara Kurrara National Park =

National park in Western Australia

- Interactive map of Matuwa Kurrara Kurrara National Park
- Type: National park
- Location: Goldfields–Esperance region
- Coordinates: 25°50′40″S 121°40′50″E
- Area: 609,300 hectares (1,506,000 acres)
- Administrator: Department of Biodiversity, Conservation and Attractions Tarlka Matuwa Piarku Aboriginal Corporation

Matuwa Kurrara Kurrara National Park is a national park in the Goldfields–Esperance region of Western Australia, 160 km (99 mi) east of Wiluna. The national park, with a size of 609,300 hectares (1,506,000 acres), was created in May 2023, alongside the Lake Carnegie nature reserve to the east of it, which is centered around Lake Carnegie, an important wetland. The national park is located south of the Little Sandy Desert.

== Overview ==
The national park is located on the traditional land of the Martu people, with the Tarlka Matuwa Piarku Aboriginal Corporation jointly managing the national park and nature reserve with the Department of Biodiversity, Conservation and Attractions. The Tarlka Matuwa Piarku Aboriginal Corporation also holds the native title to the area around Wiluna. The primary reason for splitting the protected area into a national park and a nature reserve was to develop the national park for tourism but not the nature reserve, which contains many sites sacred to the Martu people.

The land of the Matuwa Kurrara Kurrara National Park was previously held by two pastoral leases, the cattle stations of Lorna Glen and Earaheedy, but purchased by the Western Australian Government in 2000 and subsequently declared an Indigenous Protected Area in 2012. The name of the national park results from the indigenous names of the former cattle station, Matuwa, the name of a near-by water soak, for Lorna Glen and Kurrara Kurrara for Earaheedy, after the name for an acacia tree common to the area.

Within the national park lies a 2,000 hectares (4,900 acres) fenced-off compound used for breeding of endangered marsupials, to protect them from feral introduced animals like cats and dogs. Native wildlife is released from there into the national park as well as sent to the eastern states of Australia. Among the animals collected by the Martu rangers in the national park is the mulgara, an almost critically endangered native animal that still thrives in Matuwa Kurrara Kurrara National Park. Mulgaras are subsequently relocated to Dirk Hartog Island, where they had become extinct because of the introduction of feral animals there.
