= Parnngurr Community =

Community in Western Australia

Coordinates: 22°49′01″S 122°35′52″E

Parnngurr Western Australia
- Parnngurr, Punmu and Karlamilyi National Park
- Population: 129 (2016 census)
- Established: 1984
- Postcode(s): 6760
- Elevation: 400 m (1,312 ft)
- Location: 370 km (230 mi) east of Newman, Western Australia
- LGA(s): Shire of East Pilbara
- State electorate(s): Pilbara
- Federal division(s): Durack

Parnngurr is a medium-sized Aboriginal community, located 370 km from Newman in the Pilbara region of Western Australia, within the Shire of East Pilbara. Parnngurr was originally known as Cotton Creek, the name of the ephemeral creek that runs beside the community.

== Local area ==
The community sits within Karlamilyi National Park. The park is the largest in the state, and one of the most rugged and remote in Australia. There are no park facilities outside the Parnngurr and Punmu settlements. The popular Desert Queen Baths lie about a half day's drive away along the Rudall River track; also in the area is Kalkan Kalkan Soak, Hanging Rock, Parnngurr Hill (Mt Cotton) and Parnngurr Rock Hole, as well as numerous bluffs, caves, creeks and bush tracks for the adventurous.

== Facilities ==
The community shop provides residents and visitors with fuel, food, cold drinks, some camping and vehicle gear, and fresh fruit and vegetables. The community also supplies emergency medical facilities, accommodation, visitors' camping, caravan parking and laundry. Fuel supply is reliable and many visitors to the Canning Stock Route and Karlamilyi National Park stop in Parnngurr to refuel and pick up supplies. Staff and residents are very knowledgeable about the area and are happy to provide advice on road conditions and places to visit. Although permits are not required to visit Parnngurr, it is a dry community, meaning that drugs and alcohol are not allowed.

== Native title ==
The community is located within the Martu native title determination area. In 2002, the Martu were recognised as holding native title rights to over 13.6 million hectares of the Western Desert, an area stretching from the Percival Lakes in the north to south of Kumpupintil Lake and from near Jigalong and Balfour Downs east to the Kiwirrkurra and Ngaanyatjarra native title determinations.

== Education ==
Children of school age at Parnngurr attend the Parnngurr Community School. 2020 second semester enrolment was 18, from Year 1 to Year 10.

== Governance ==
The community is managed through its incorporated body, Parnngurr Aboriginal Corporation, incorporated under the Aboriginal Councils and Associations Act 1976 on 6 December 1989.

== Town planning ==
Parnngurr Layout Plan No.2 has been prepared in accordance with State Planning Policy 3.2 Aboriginal Settlements. Layout Plan No.2 was endorsed by the community on 18 April 2007 and the Western Australian Planning Commission on 4 December 2007.
