= Ctenophorus nguyarna =

Lake Disappointment dragon

Conservation status
- Vulnerable (IUCN 3.1)

Scientific classification
- Kingdom: Animalia
- Phylum: Chordata
- Class: Reptilia
- Order: Squamata
- Suborder: Iguania
- Family: Agamidae
- Genus: Ctenophorus
- Species: C. nguyarna

Binomial name
- Ctenophorus nguyarna Doughty, Maryan, Melville & J. Austin, 2007

Species of lizard

Ctenophorus nguyarna, commonly known as the Lake Disappointment dragon is a species of agamid lizard occurring in low samphire shrubs fringing the remote Kumpupintil Lake (previously Lake Disappointment), Western Australia.

== Etymology ==
Nguyarna is the Kartujarra word for Kumpupintil Lake, the lizard's habitat.

== Conservation ==
The lizard is one of the most threatened Australian reptile species.
