= Percival Lakes =

Lakes in Western Australia

- Location within Western Australia
- Interactive map of Percival Lakes
- Location: Western Australia
- Coordinates: 21°30′S 124°30′E
- Type: Salt lake
- Basin countries: Australia
- Surface elevation: 256 m (840 ft)

The Percival Lakes form a string of S-shaped ephemeral salt lakes in the north of Western Australia. They lie at the southern region of the Great Sandy Desert and east of Karlamilyi National Park. They stretch in an east-west direction for 350 km (220 mi) and north-south for 160 km (99 mi). The surface elevation is 256 m (840 ft). The Canning Stock Route runs in close proximity to some of the lakes, and crosses the salt pan of Tobin Lake near the eastern end. The lakes were named during the aerial expedition of Donald George Mackay in 1933, after the designer of the Percival Gull aircraft being used.

== See also ==
- Edgar Percival
