= Putijarra =

The Putijarra are an Aboriginal Australian people of the Pilbara region of Western Australia.

== Country ==
Putijarra territory, in Norman Tindale's estimation, extended over 52,000 square kilometres (20,000 mi^{2}). They were to be found south of Lake George, and east to Kolajuru, and beyond the southeast of Kumpupintil Lake, latterly at Mendel in the direction of the Hutton Range. The frontier with the Mandjildjara lay at Tjundutjundu well on the Canning Stock Route. When drought struck they would press south to Kadidi near Lake Augusta, and the moon totem soak called Tjangara. Their most southerly boundary was at Pulburumal, the twelfth waterhole on the Canning Stock Route. Their border with the Kartudjara was at Lawulawu (Canning Stock Route Well 16).

== History ==
Putijarra people were traditionally hunter-gatherers, who practised firestick farming. In the 1920s, many migrated to Jigalong because of drought, and also shootings of Aboriginals occurring in their territory. Some also migrated to Wiluna.

== Alternative names ==
- Potitjara, Putitjara
- Budidjara, Bududjara
- Purditara
- Pawutudjara
- Paodudjara
- Patudja
- Patudjara
- Partutudjara
- Bawndudjara
- Partutu (lake people)
- Ngondidjara (Kartudjara exonym)
- Kaltalbudara
- Kaltalbudjara
- Kaltalbudjira
- Poroko (Kokatja exonym)
- Barduwonga
- Badu, Pardu (?)
- Tutudjara

== Sources ==
- Bates, D. M. (1913). Social organization of some Western Australian tribes. Vol. 14. Australian Association for the Advancement of Science. pp. 387–400.
- Berndt, Ronald M. (December 1960). "The Concept of 'The Tribe' in the Western Desert of Australia". Oceania. 30 (2): 81–107. doi:10.1002/j.1834-4461.1959.tb00213.x. JSTOR 40329194.
- Tindale, Norman Barnett (1974). "Potidjara (WA)". Aboriginal Tribes of Australia: Their Terrain, Environmental Controls, Distribution, Limits, and Proper Names. Australian National University. ISBN 978-0-708-10741-6. Archived from the original on 20 March 2020.
