= Lake Dora (Western Australia) =

Salt lake in Western Australia

- Ngayartakujarra (Warnman)
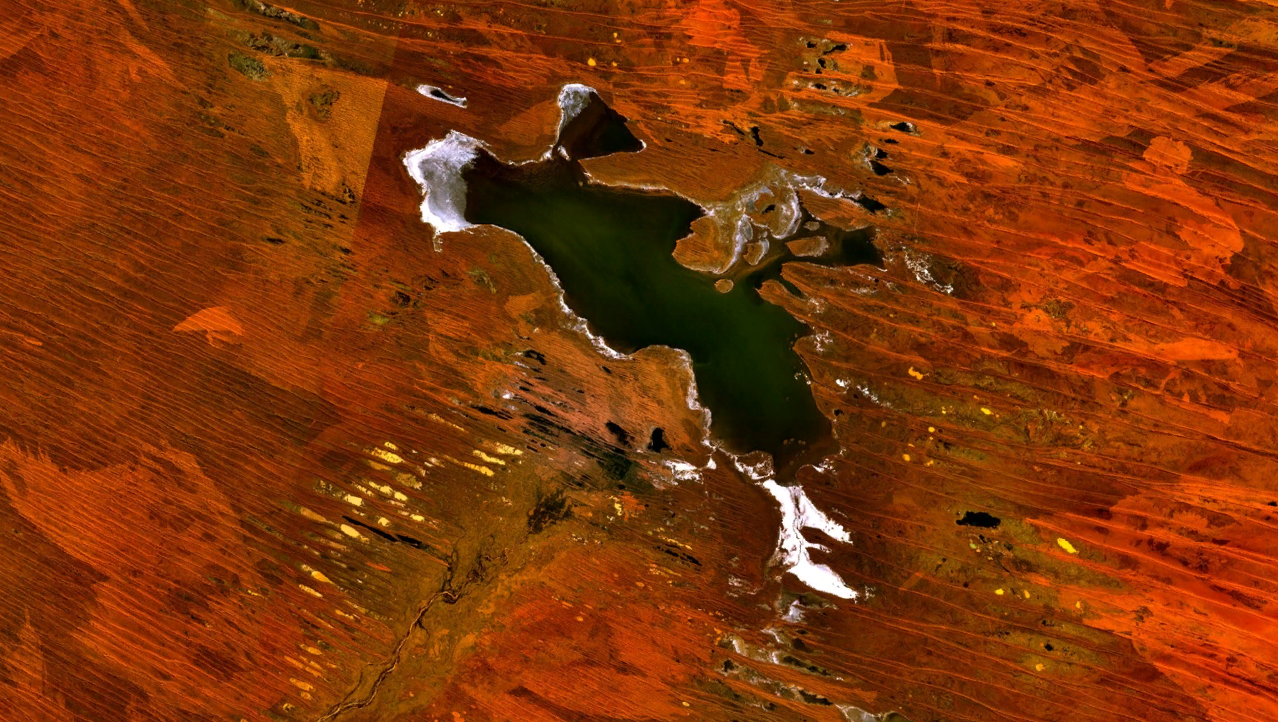
- Lake Dora as seen from outer space.

- Map of Lake Dora and Rudall River

- Location within Western Australia
- Interactive map of Lake Dora
- Location: Pilbara, Western Australia
- Coordinates: 22°03′S 122°57′E
- Type: Seasonal salt lake
- Primary inflows: Rudall River
- Basin countries: Australia
- Surface elevation: 237 m (778 ft)

Lake Dora (Wanman: Ngayartakujarra) is a seasonal salt lake in the Pilbara region of Western Australia. It lies between the vegetated sand fields of the Great Sandy and Gibson Deserts. The Rudall River occasionally flows into Lake Dora.

== See also ==
- List of lakes of Australia § Western Australia
- Karlamilyi National Park - Lake Dora lies entirely within the park.
