= Punmu Community =

Community in Western Australia

Coordinates: 22°02′38″S 123°07′23″E

Punmu Western Australia
- Punmu, Parnngurr and Karlamilyi National Park
- Population: 142 (2016 census)
- Established: 1985
- Postcode(s): 6753
- Location: 640 km (398 mi) south east of Port Hedland, Western Australia
- LGA(s): Shire of East Pilbara
- State electorate(s): Pilbara
- Federal division(s): Durack

Punmu is an Aboriginal community, located 640 km south east of Port Hedland in the Pilbara region of Western Australia, within the Shire of East Pilbara.

The Martu language, Manyjiljarra (pronounced Mun-dul-jar-ah), is the first language of all Indigenous people who live in Punmu, and the written language is taught in Rawa Community School. English is learnt by many within the community to communicate effectively, but is not often used between the Martu people.

== Native title ==
The community is located within the determined Martu (WG6110/98) native title claim area. In 2002, the Martu were awarded native title rights to over 13.6 million hectares of the Western Desert, an area stretching from the Percival Lakes in the north to south of Lake Disappointment, and from near Jigalong and Balfour Downs east to the Kiwirrkurra and Ngaanyatjarra native title determinations.

== Education ==
Children of school age at Punmu attend the Rawa Community School. The school is made up of the school board, the trainee principal, the principal mentor/administrator, the non-Indigenous teachers, the Aboriginal Education Workers, and specialist teachers. These staff manage, control and teach the school and its 74 students.

== Governance ==
The community is managed through its incorporated body, Punmu Aboriginal Corporation, incorporated under the Aboriginal Councils and Associations Act 1976 on 14 December 1983.

== Town planning ==
Punmu Layout Plan No.2 has been prepared in accordance with State Planning Policy 3.2 Aboriginal Settlements. Layout Plan No.2 was endorsed by the community on 20 June 2007 and the Western Australian Planning Commission on 4 December 2007.
