= Acacia sabulosa =

Scientific classification
- Kingdom: Plantae
- Clade: Tracheophytes
- Clade: Angiosperms
- Clade: Eudicots
- Clade: Rosids
- Order: Fabales
- Family: Fabaceae
- Subfamily: Caesalpinioideae
- Clade: Mimosoid clade
- Genus: Acacia
- Species: A. sabulosa

Binomial name
- Acacia sabulosa Maslin
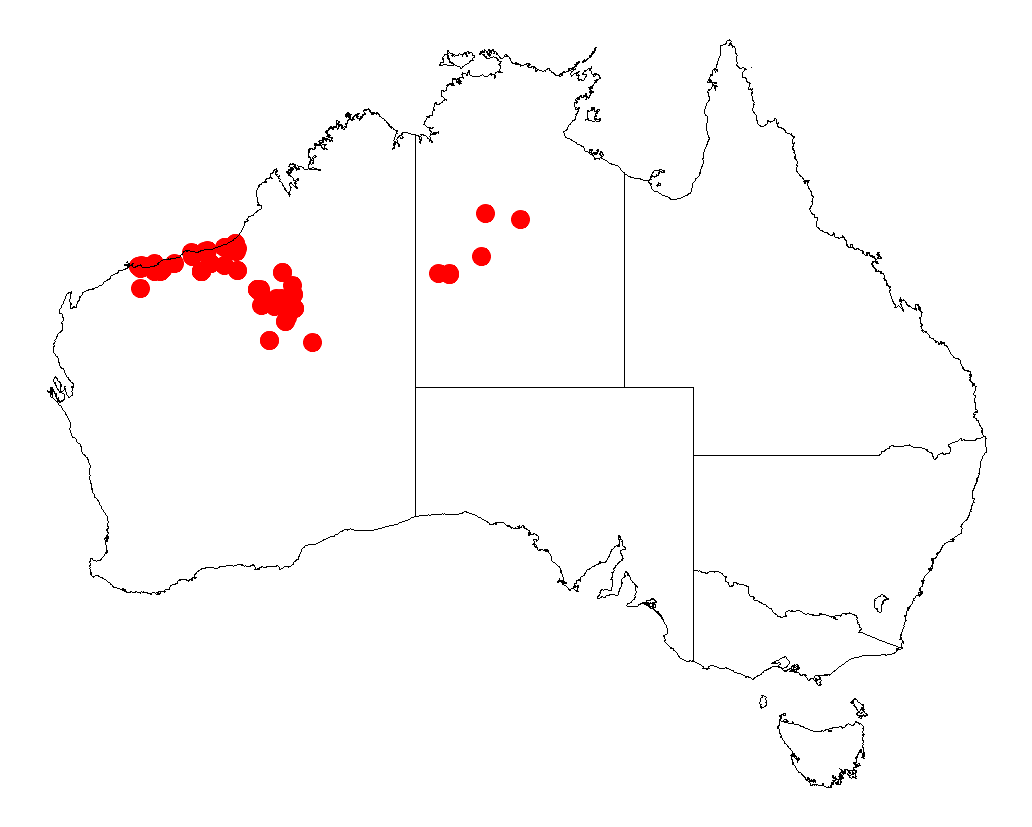
- Occurrence data from AVH

Species of legume

Acacia sabulosa is a shrub of the genus Acacia and the subgenus Phyllodineae that is endemic to north western Australia.

== Description ==
The bushy resinous shrub typically grows to a height of 1 to 5 metres (3 to 16 ft). The glabrous and spreading shrub has a "V" shape and a crown that is around 3 m (9.8 ft) across. It forms many stems at or near the base with additional branches forming about 1 m (3 ft 3 in) from the base. It has smooth dark grey coloured bark that becomes fissured at the base with age. The slender, yellow to light brown coloured branchlet have bright green new shoots. Like most species of Acacia it has phyllodes rather than true leaves. The soft, flexible, thin, dull green and sometimes scurfy phyllodes have a linear shape with a length of 4 to 10 cm (1.6 to 3.9 in) and a width of 1 to 3.5 mm (0.039 to 0.138 in). It blooms from May to July and produces yellow flowers.

== Distribution ==
It is native to an area in the Northern Territory and the Goldfields-Esperance and Pilbara regions of Western Australia. It usually grows in sand dunes around the Eremaean Province and Northern Province with very arid landscapes and red brown coloured sandy soils. The shrub has a discontinuous distribution within the Pilbara region from coastal areas between Port Hedland and Cossack in the west to Marble Bar and Shay Gap, Western Australia. It also occurs further north from around Mandora extending eastward to the Great Sandy Desert and the Little Sandy Desert. It also located in the Northern Territory in the Tanami Desert where it is often a part of spinifex communities.

== See also ==
- List of Acacia species
