= Warnman people =

Aboriginal people of Western Australia

The Warnman, also spelt Wanman, are an Aboriginal Australian people of Western Australia's Pilbara region.

== Country ==
The Warnman people's territory extends over some 24,000 square kilometres (9,400 sq mi). Their southern boundary lies around the McKay Range and the area of Kumpupintil Lake. Westwards, it reaches Wadurara on the Rudall River (Karlamilyi). The northern frontier lies in the vicinity of Lake Dora (Walerelere), Mendidjildjil and Karbardi, while they are present eastwards as far as the George, Wooloomber and Auld Lakes. The change from claypan lakes country to mulga terrain in the south marked a limit beyond which they thought danger lay.

== Ecology ==
As often, natural features can mark a kind of informal boundary between tribes. With the Wanman, that boundary in the south is delineated by the transition from their clumpy porcupine grassland to the thick mulga shrubland of the Kartudjara. The onset of drought would push them northwest, to around Karbardi and Pulburukuritji, and Kalamilji. Their harsh, almost treeless, sandhill landscape is mostly devoid of larger game like emu and kangaroo, though the hare wallaby and opossum, if caught, would provide some meat. Its poor grassland constrains the Wanman to develop grass-milling to eke out food from seeds, one of the few Australian tribes, such as the Ualarai and the Pila Nguru, who resort to this technique. A list of the primary foods was provided to Norman Tindale by one tribesman:

- Their main cereal food came from threshing and winnowing Triodia grass seed
- Cyperus bulbs could be harvested from clay flats lying between the sand-dunes sometime after heavy rains had fallen
- Hare wallaby were hunted down with a throwing stick
- Brushtail possum
- Porcupines
- Cossid moth grubs found on shrub roots
- Pig weevil grubs
- Lizards, such as the sleepy lizard
- Black goannas and sand goannas
- Sandhill frogs found after rain sweeps the desert
- Ducks were elusive but their eggs, laid after the rains, were prized

Portulaca seeds, once harvested, were worked in stone-rings. The throwing stick also served as a digging stick to forage for marsupial moles. String spun from animals or hair, worn around the waist, was used to lasso lizards, and then hitch them to a string belt to bring back to the campsite.

== Social organisation ==
The Warnman were probably divided into six groups or clans, each with its own wells. Such estates gave exclusive wood-cutting rights to each member of the group but Warnman from all clans had equal access to the major watering holes. Drought would at times force them into Nyangumarta land where, in exchange for water, they would be constrained to hand over their women in marriage. The Nyangumarta themselves would often raid the Warnman in order to secure wives.

== History of contact ==
The extreme conditions of desert life pressed the Wanman to develop techniques to harvest food from grasses and this traditional knowledge served them well as they moved towards the coast, since they could quickly adapt their skills to glean buffel or afghan grass, which had seeded into the landscape from imported camel saddles and was in demand as a fodder grass in arid zones.

== Alternative names ==
- Wanmanba (Mandjildjara exonym)
- Wanmin
- Nanidjarara (contemptuous exonym used of them by the Kartudjara and others; the Wanman applied, in turn, this word to the Nangatara)
- Nenidjara
- Njanidjara
- Warumala (Mangala exonym, used generally in the area, with a basic sense of 'foreigner/stranger')

== Sources ==
- "AIATSIS map of Indigenous Australia". AIATSIS. 14 May 2024.
- "Tindale Tribal Boundaries" (PDF). Department of Aboriginal Affairs, Western Australia. September 2016. Archived from the original (PDF) on 8 March 2016.
- Tindale, Norman Barnett (1974). "Wanman (WA)". Aboriginal Tribes of Australia: Their Terrain, Environmental Controls, Distribution, Limits, and Proper Names. Australian National University. ISBN 978-0-708-10741-6. Archived from the original on 20 March 2020.
- Worms, E. A. (1959). "Verbannungslied eines australischen Wildbeuters. Ein Beitrag zur Lyrik der Bād". Anthropos. 54 (1/2): 154–168. JSTOR 40454331.
