= Kartudjara =

Indigenous group in the Pilbara region of Western Australia

The Kartudjara are an Aboriginal Australian people of the Pilbara region of Western Australia.

== Country ==
The Kartudjara's traditional lands extended over 26,000 square kilometres (10,000 sq mi) from Madaleri, north of Kumpupintil Lake around Well 22 down southwest towards Pulpuruma (Well 12). Their western boundary lay on the southern side of the Rudall River (Karlamilyi) as far as the Robertson Range and the eastern headwaters of both the Jigalong and Savory Creeks. The country was characterized by endemic parallel sand-dune formations.

== History ==
Around the 1890s the Kartudjara pressured the Niabali to their northwest, off Savory Creek, forcing them to move roughly 97 kilometres (60 mi) to Balfour Downs. The Kartudjara thereafter went on to water at the Rudall River, which became in time their northern frontier. Their neighbours beyond the mulga were the spinifex plainsmen, the Wanman and the Nyangumarta.

The Kartudjara became, in recent times, one of the two core constituent tribal groups forming the Martu. That term actually signified "northerners", but originally was used primarily to denote people who had undergone initiation rites to become fully-fledged tribesmen.

Some Kartudjara were received as "lawmen" by the coastal peoples to their west in the post-war period, since they, like other desert tribes, had conserved the traditional ceremonial lore that had been lost to tribes on the Indian Ocean's coastal areas.

== Alternative names ==
- Katudjara, Katatjara, Kardudjara
- Gadudjara
- Walmala
- Orailku
- Ngadari ('strangers')

== Sources ==
- "AIATSIS map of Indigenous Australia". AIATSIS. 14 May 2024.
- "Tindale Tribal Boundaries" (PDF). Department of Aboriginal Affairs, Western Australia. September 2016. Archived from the original (PDF) on 8 March 2016.
- Brown, A. R. (January–June 1913). "Three Tribes of Western Australia". The Journal of the Royal Anthropological Institute of Great Britain and Ireland. 43: 143–194. doi:10.2307/2843166. JSTOR 2843166.
- Gray, Dennis (March 1978). "A Revival of the Law: The Probable Spread of Initiation Circumcision to the Coast of Western Australia". Oceania. 48 (3): 188–201. doi:10.1002/j.1834-4461.1978.tb01339.x. JSTOR 40330353.
- Tindale, Norman Barnett (1974). "Kartudjara (WA)". Aboriginal Tribes of Australia: Their Terrain, Environmental Controls, Distribution, Limits, and Proper Names. Australian National University. ISBN 978-0-708-10741-6. Archived from the original on 20 March 2020.
