= Acacia orthotropica =

Mount Trafalgar wattle

Conservation status
- Priority Two — Poorly Known Taxa (DEC)

Scientific classification
- Kingdom: Plantae
- Clade: Tracheophytes
- Clade: Angiosperms
- Clade: Eudicots
- Clade: Rosids
- Order: Fabales
- Family: Fabaceae
- Subfamily: Caesalpinioideae
- Clade: Mimosoid clade
- Genus: Acacia
- Species: A. orthotropica

Binomial name
- Acacia orthotropica Maslin, M.D.Barrett & R.L.Barrett

Species of legume

Acacia orthotropica, commonly known as Mount Trafalgar wattle, is a species of flowering plant in the family Fabaceae, and is endemic to a restricted area of northern Western Australia. It is an erect, single-stemmed, inverted conical tree with terete glabrous branchlets, erect, crowded narrowly oblong phyllodes, spherical heads of pale yellow flowers and oblong or narrowly oblong, firmly papery to very thinly crusty pods.

== Description ==
Acacia orthotropica is an erect, single-stemmed, inverted conical tree that typically grows to a height of up to 4 m (13 ft) and has terete, glabrous reddish brown coloured branchlets. Its phyllodes are erect, crowded, narrowly oblong, 30–60 mm (1.2–2.4 in) long, 3–5 mm (0.12–0.20 in) wide, thinly leathery with two longitudinal veins, the midvein the most prominent. The flowers are borne in one or two spherical heads in axils on slender curved or s-shaped peduncles 20–30 mm (0.79–1.18 in) long, each head with 30 to 35 pale yellow flowers. Flowering has been observed in late January, and the pods are oblong to narrowly oblong, 30–80 mm (1.2–3.1 in) long, 14–16 mm (0.55–0.63 in) wide, firmly papery to very thinly crusty, reddish brown and glabrous.

== Taxonomy ==
Acacia orthotropica was first formally described in 2013 by Bruce Maslin, Matthew David Barrett and Russell Lindsay Barrett in the journal Nuytsia from specimens collected by Russell Barrett north-east of Mount Trafalgar in the Prince Regent National Park in 2010. The specific epithet (orthotropica) means 'straight-turning', referring to the phyllodes that are "characteristically straight and aligned erect relative to the branchlets".

== Distribution and habitat ==
Mount Trafalgar wattle is only known from the type collection in the Prince Regent National Park in the Kimberley region of northern Western Australia, where it grows on a broken sandstone slope, near a low basaltic slope in open shrubland over dense spinifex.

== Conservation status ==
Acacia orthotropica is listed as 'Priority Two', meaning that it is poorly known and from only one or a few locations.

== See also ==
- List of Acacia species
