= Acacia jensenii =

Scientific classification
- Kingdom: Plantae
- Clade: Embryophytes
- Clade: Tracheophytes
- Clade: Spermatophytes
- Clade: Angiosperms
- Clade: Eudicots
- Clade: Rosids
- Order: Fabales
- Family: Fabaceae
- Subfamily: Caesalpinioideae
- Clade: Mimosoid clade
- Genus: Acacia
- Species: A. jensenii

Binomial name
- Acacia jensenii Maiden
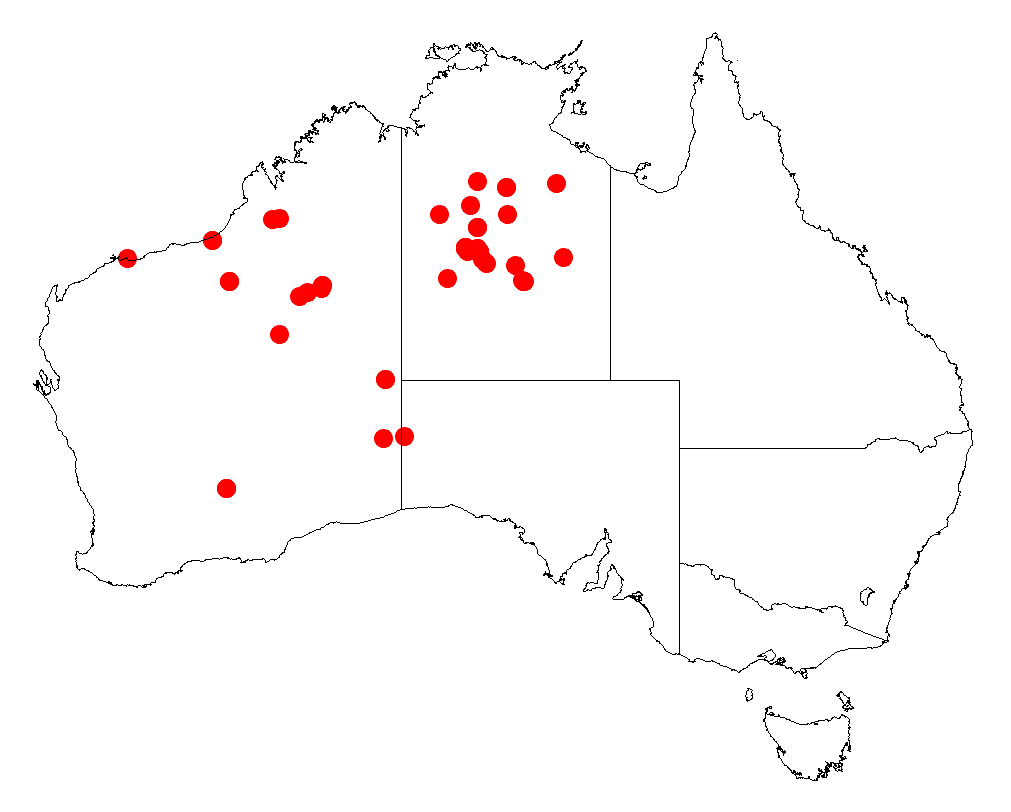
- Occurrence data from AVH

Synonyms
- Acacia jenseni Maiden orth. var.; Racosperma jensenii (Maiden) Pedley

Species of legume

Acacia jensenii is a species of flowering plant in the family Fabaceae and is endemic to north western Australia. It is a spindly, open shrub or tree with linear to narrowly elliptic phyllodes and heads of yellow flowers.

== Description ==
Acacia jensenii is a spindly, open shrub or tree that typically grows to a height of 1–6 m (3 ft 3 in – 19 ft 8 in) and has one or two glabrous main stems at the base. Its phyllodes are straight or slightly curved, linear to narrowly lance-shaped, 25–60 mm (0.98–2.36 in) long, 3–6 mm (0.12–0.24 in) wide and end in a small point. The midrib and lateral veins are somewhat prominent and there is a gland at the base of the phyllode. The flowers are yellow and usually borne in axils on a peduncle up to 25 mm (0.98 in) long. Flowering occurs from May to August and the (immature) pods are 7–8 mm (0.28–0.31 in) wide.

== Taxonomy ==
Acacia jensenii was first formally described in 1917 by Joseph Maiden in the book The Flora of the Northern Territory from specimens collected in 1911. The specific epithet (jensenii) honours Harold Ingomar Jensen, who, when government geologist of the Northern Territory, "collected the local flora, particularly Eucalyptus".

== Distribution and habitat ==
This species of wattle has a scattered distribution in the Coolgardie, Dampierland, Great Sandy Desert, Great Victoria Desert and Tanami bioregions of Western Australia and in the Burt Plain, Davenport Murchison Ranges, Great Sandy Desert, Gulf Fall and Uplands, Sturt Plateau and Tanami bioregions of the Northern Territory. In the Edgar Range in Western Australia it grows in sandstone gullies and at Lake Surprise in the Northern Territory, it grows on the upper slopes and crests of sand dunes.

== Conservation status ==
Acacia jensenii is listed as 'not threatened' by the Government of Western Australia Department of Parks and Wildlife, and as 'least concern under the Northern Territory Government Territory Parks and Wildlife Conservation Act.

== See also ==
- List of Acacia species
