= Karlamilyi National Park =

National park in the Pilbara region of Western Australia

- IUCN category II (national park)
- Karlamilyi National Park

- Location within Western Australia
- Location: Western Australia
- Coordinates: 22°20′00″S 122°29′00″E
- Area: 12,837.06 km^{2} (4,956.42 sq mi)
- Established: 1977
- Governing body: Western Australian Parks and Wildlife Service
- Website: Official website

Karlamilyi National Park lies in the Pilbara region of Western Australia, 250 kilometres (160 mi) northeast of Newman and 1,250 kilometres (780 mi) north-northeast of Perth. Proclaimed an A Class Reserve on 13 April 1977, it is the largest national park in Western Australia.

The park was initially listed on the Register of the National Estate in 1978 as Rudall River National Park, and was noted as "significant for maintaining ongoing geomorphic and ecological processes within a tropical desert environment. It contains an entire landscape sequence which includes extensive dune fields, table lands, an entire river/creek system, alluvial formations, saline lakes and palaeodrainage lines". The name of the park was changed in 2008 to Karlamilyi National Park to acknowledge the traditional owners of the area. The park's original name was derived from the Rudall River, named by Frank Hann who was one of the first Europeans to explore the area. He named the river after another explorer and surveyor, William Frederick Rudall.

The area is traditionally Martu country, called Karlamilyi. There are two Aboriginal communities within the park: Parnngurr (Cotton Creek) and Punmu (Lake Dora). The park is situated across the boundary between the Little Sandy Desert and the Great Sandy Desert and includes the catchment area of the Rudall River. It is best accessed from the Rudall River Road, which connects the Talawana Track in the south, and the Telfer Mine Road in the north. There are no ranger facilities within the park. Fuel, groceries, emergency medical facilities, camping gear, caravan parking and laundry are available at Parnngurr.

== See also ==
- Protected areas of Western Australia
- List of national parks of Australia
- Canning Stock Route
