= Little Sandy Desert =

Ecoregion and desert in Western Australia

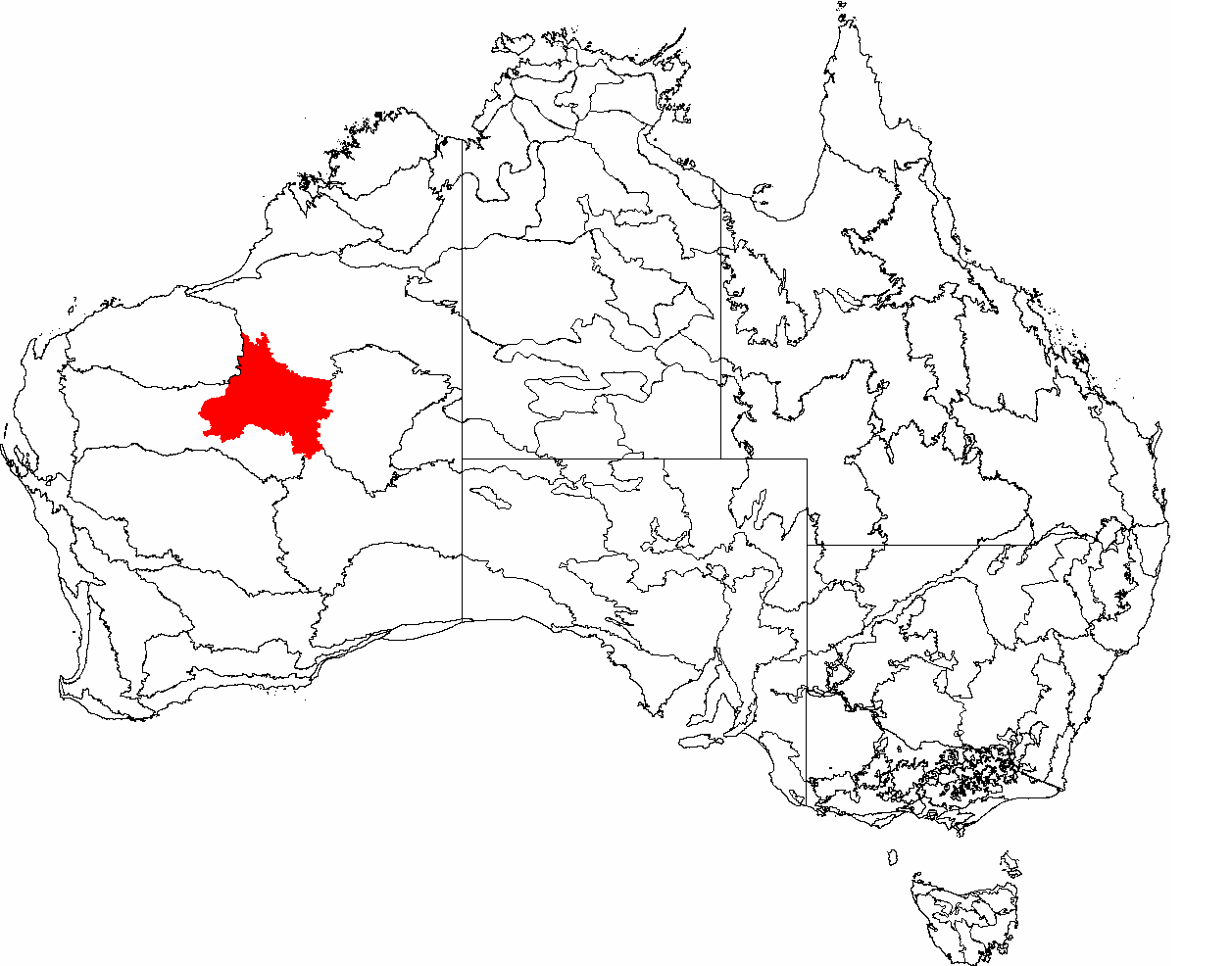
- The IBRA regions, with Little Sandy Desert in red
- Area: 111,500 km^{2} (43,100 mi^{2})

Geography
- State: Western Australia
- Region: Australia
- Coordinates: 25.26°S 121.86°E
- Interactive map of Little Sandy Desert

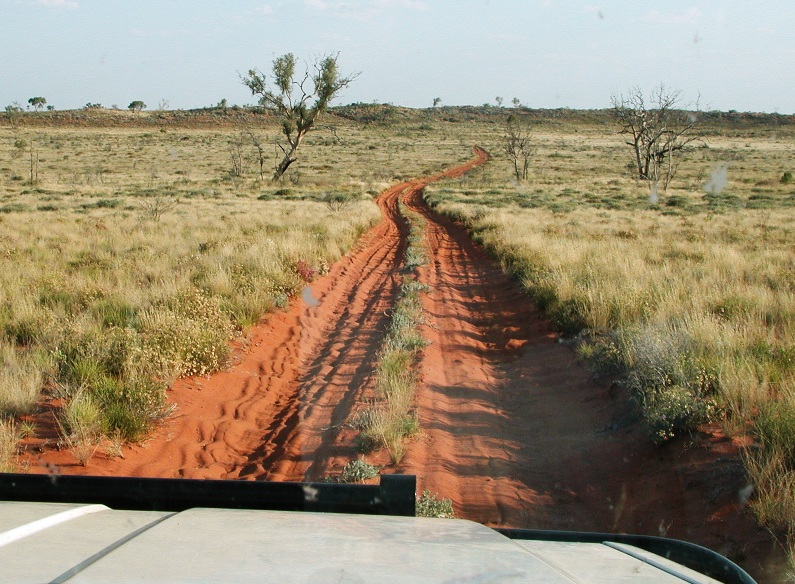
Little Sandy Desert crossed by the Canning Stock Route

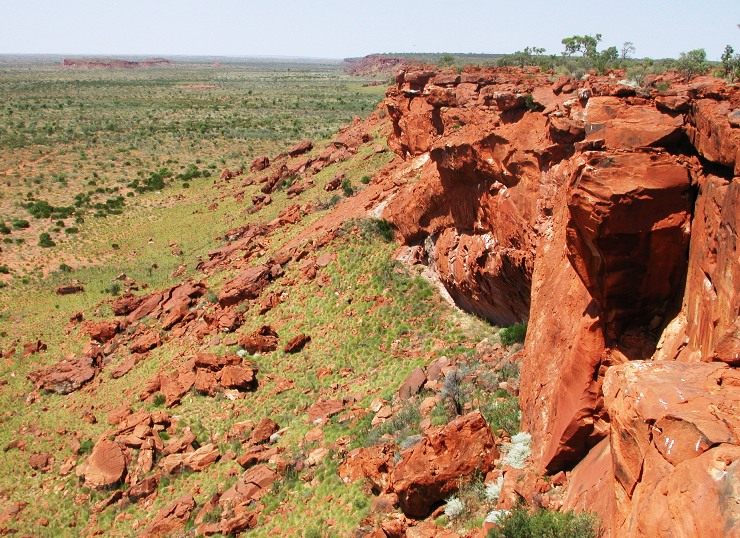
Little Sandy Desert near Durba Spring

The Little Sandy Desert (LSD) is a desert region in the state of Western Australia, lying to the east of the Pilbara and north of the Gascoyne regions. It is part of the Western Desert cultural region, and was declared an interim Australian bioregion in the 1990s.

== History ==
Indigenous groups that have identified with the region include the Mandilara, an Aboriginal Australian group who are regarded as the traditional owners of the land. Today the group recognised as traditional owners are the Martu people.

The desert is crossed by the Canning Stock Route, an historic stock route created in the early 20th century.

== Description ==
The Little Sandy Desert covers around 110,900 km^{2} (42,800 sq mi) and adjoins the Great Sandy Desert (267,250 km^{2} (103,190 sq mi), to the north) and the Gibson Desert (156,300 km^{2} (60,300 sq mi), to the east), all of which lie within the huge Australian Arid Zone which covers the centre of the Australian continent. It lies east of the Pilbara region, and north of Gascoyne, and is part of the Western Desert.

To the north the nearest large area identifiable is the Karlamilyi National Park.

== Geography ==
Its landforms, fauna and flora are all similar to the Great Sandy Desert. The three deserts have low and highly variable rainfall, averaging 250–350 mm (9.8–13.8 in) annually, with most of it in summer. The median annual rainfall, based on the years 1890–2005, across the whole of the LSD is 178 mm (7.0 in). and are subject to extreme heat. The landscape is dominated by red sand dunes, sandstone mesas and rocky plains.

The Rudall River has its headwaters in the LSD, flowing northeast into the southern Great Sandy Desert, where it occasionally empties into Lake Dora, an ephemeral salt lake. There are a few permanent water sources in the hills, and some waterholes left by the Canning Stock Route.

The town of Jigalong is on the western edge of the desert, with a population of approximately 300 in 2016. The traditional owners of this area are recognised as the Martu people. There are also two smaller communities at Parnngurr and Punmu.

=== Locations ===
Kumpupintil Lake

Some of the landforms and locations within the LSD include:

- Carnarvon Range, aka Katjarra
- Calvert Range
- McKay Range
- Durba Hills
- Savory Creek
- Kumpupintil Lake (formerly Lake Disappointment)
- Rudall River headwaters
- Beyondie Camp
- Cooma Camp
- Savory Camp

== Ecology ==
There is a high level of biodiversity among plants and animals, with some species threatened by various factors. Only around 4.6% of the Little Sandy Desert bioregion is within a protected area, much of which is managed as an Indigenous Protected Area, the Birriliburu Indigenous Protected Area (IPA), which stretches into the Gibson Desert, meaning that the land is looked after by its traditional owners.

Most of the area is covered by hummock grasslands (Triodia spp.), with a few eucalypts, acacias, grevilleas, and bloodwoods (Corymbia chippendalei) are found on sand hills. As of 2020 over 2000 plant taxa have been identified, with only two of these recognised as threatened species; over 550 of these are in the southern LSD, including 16 species of conservation significance. The bark of the birdflower is used by local people to make belts and sandals, while the spear tree is used for making spears for men and digging sticks for women.

There are many reptiles and birds species, but many small- to medium-sized mammals have gone extinct, and many are threatened. There have been 103 bird species recorded in the Birriliburu IPA, and 116 within the whole desert, including the Australian bustard (Aredeotis australis) and bush stone-curlew (Burhinus grallariu). Threatened animal species include:

- Greater bilby
- Princess parrot
- Kakarratul/northern marsupial mole
- Australian bustard
- Brush-tailed mulgara
- Grey falcon

Threats to biodiversity include wildfires, feral animals, weeds, and uncontrolled grazing. Feral camels destroy water sources, and along with donkeys, horses and rabbits help destroy the ecosystem by overgrazing. feral cats have reduced the populations of bilbies and mulgara. Foxes are the main threats to mammals. Buffel grass threatens the native plant species, as it is tough, and burns hotter in the ever more frequent bushfires caused by climate change.

Bush Heritage Australia has done some plant and animal surveys in Katjarra.

== Bioregion ==
The Little Sandy Desert (LSD) is an interim Australian bioregion no. 63, covering 11,089,857 km^{2} (4,281,818 sq mi). The biogregions were developed by the Australian Government as an environmental planning tool in the 1990s, with IBRA7 defining "large geographically distinct bioregions based on common climate, geology, landform, native vegetation and species information".

== Economy ==
There are almost no tourist facilities, and the environment is harsh. Only the most experienced travellers, who know how to survive without help in the desert, should visit. Few roads are signposted. At Katjarra, there are two camping spots, with shed tanks and long-drop toilets, and Indigenous rangers are available to show tourists the part of the range that is open to the public. Mining for copper and gold, and some exploration for uranium, are the main economic activities. There is limited grazing for stock animals in the east.

== Carnarvon Range/Katjarra ==
The Carnarvon Range(s), known as Katjarra to the Martu people, covers around 2,000 km^{2} (770 sq mi). It is a sacred and significant place for the Indigenous people, associated with the creator being sometimes termed the rainbow serpent, and it contains much ancient rock art. There are rock paintings of the bilby, the black-flanked rock-wallaby and a headdress made for ceremonial use, created using ochres and charcoal, and it is one of the largest such sites in Australia. Over 25,000 lithic artefacts have been located at the site.

Katjarra is fairly close to Well 5 on the Canning Stock Route, and had been frequently visited by travellers and tourists; access had also opened up from Wiluna in the 1970s owing to pastoral leases and mining interests nearby, Over time, there had been loss of or damage to thousands of Aboriginal artefacts, including grinding stones. The federal government created an Indigenous Protected Area of 66,540 km^{2} (25,690 sq mi) of the Central Desert an Indigenous Protected Area in 2008, handing over management of the land to the traditional owners. The mountain was closed to the public, as part of the Birriliburu IPA, in 2008, which gave time to plan for future tourism and to do archaeological research and ecological surveys.

=== Karnatukul ===
The rock art and archaeological site at Karnatukul was given the name Serpent's Glen by dogger Peter Muir (father of artist and Indigenous rights activist Kado Muir) in 1965, "on account of the large number of snake drawings hereabouts and their obvious association with Aboriginal legends of Rainbow Serpents".

The site was, until recently, estimated to have been inhabited for up to 25,000 years, and known as the site of the oldest continuous recorded occupation in the Western Desert cultural region. The Martu people used to congregate at Katjarra when other water sources had dried up. However, a study published in September 2018 showed that humans had in fact occupied the site around 47,830 Cal BP. This and other recent studies, which were done at the request of the native title holders, shed new light on the concept of deep time, as well as the social geography of arid zones. The study, using archaeobotany to establish its findings, found that wattle had been collected throughout the whole history of the site, confirming its status as the oldest known site of continuous occupation in the Western Desert. The wood was used as firewood, food, bush medicine and for making tools, from the Pleistocene through to the Holocene eras, and more than 100 species were used across the continent by other Aboriginal peoples. Karnakatul shows one of the earliest uses of firewood, and habitation continued through times of extreme climate change, when the desertification occurred as the polar ice sheets expanded.

In 2014, the Birriliburu traditional owners and rangers reopened Katjarra for the month of July, with the hope of opening it to the public each July in the future. Permits were issued for 70 visitors, with an access fee of $100 access fee per vehicle. It was also hoped that more Aboriginal people, especially young people, would visit to reconnect with their culture.

== See also ==
- Deserts of Australia
- List of deserts by area
