= Rudall River =

River in Pilbara region of Western Australia

Coordinates: 22°10′28″S 122°59′41″E

Rudall River (Karlamilyi)

Location
- Country: Australia

Physical characteristics
- Source
  - elevation: 385 metres (1,263 ft)
- Mouth
  - location: Lake Dora
  - elevation: 241 metres (791 ft)
- Length: 245 km (152 mi)
- Basin size: 3,391 km^{2} (1,309 sq mi)

The Rudall River (Wanman: Karlamilyi) is an ephemeral river in the Pilbara region of Western Australia. The entire length of the river is located within the boundaries of the Karlamilyi National Park, which straddles the Little Sandy Desert (LSD) and the Great Sandy Desert (GSD).

The headwaters of the river lie in the LSD below the Watrara Range near Island Hill, and it flows eastward into the GSD until it discharges into Lake Dora. The river is unique in the region as it is a major watercourse with reliable water sources and many permanent pools.

The river has a total of nine tributaries, including Watrara Creek, Rooney Creek, Poonemerlarra Creek and Dunn Creek.

The river was named by the explorer Frank Hann in 1896 after the surveyor William Frederick Rudall whom he met in the area while Hann was prospecting and Rudall was searching for men missing from the Calvert Expedition. The traditional owners of the land are the Warnman peoples, who call the river Karlamilyi.
