= Aṉangu =

Aboriginal Australian endonym

Flag

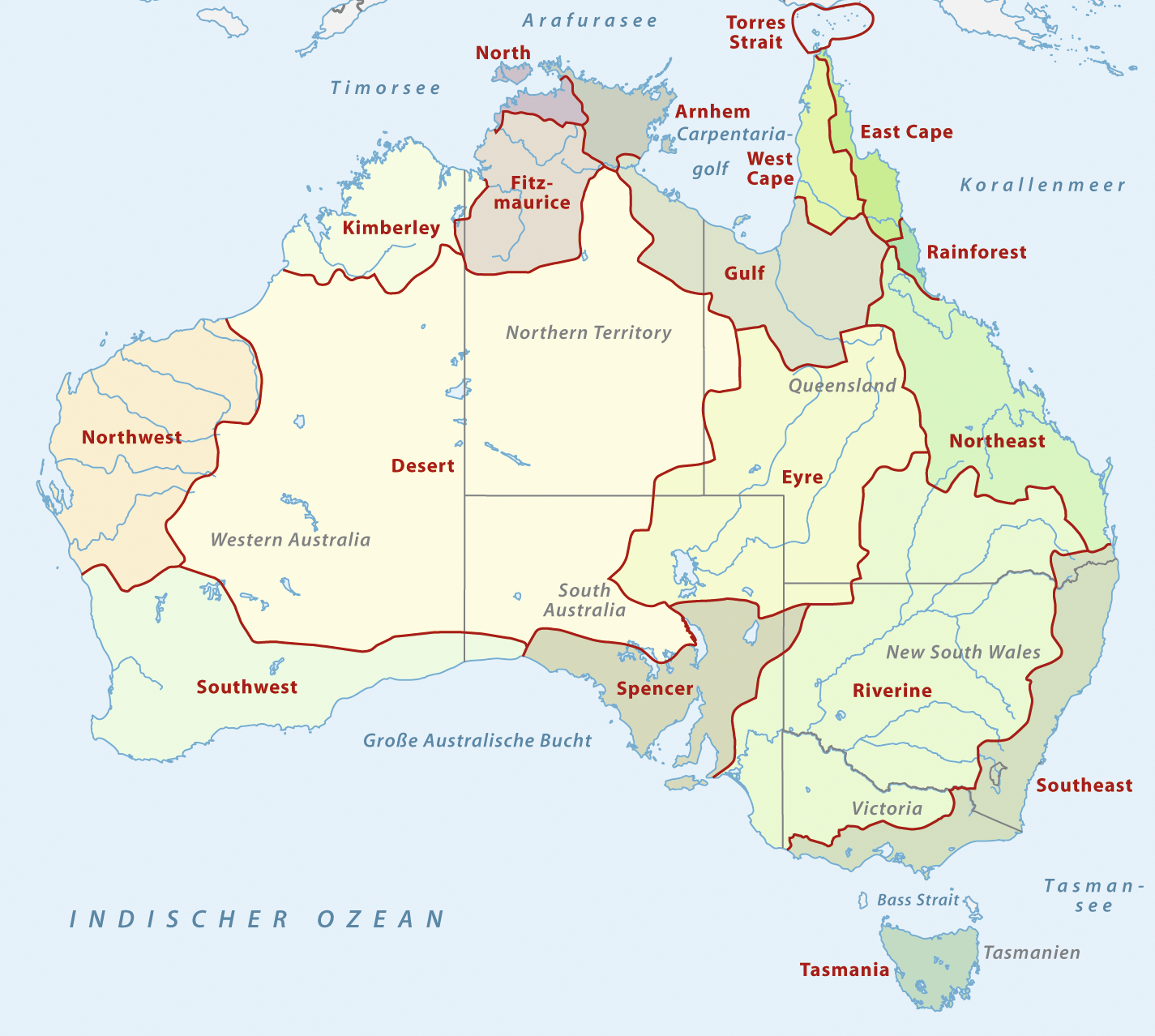
Indigenous Australian cultural regions

Aṉangu is the name used by members of several Aboriginal Australian groups, roughly equivalent to the Western Desert cultural bloc, to describe themselves. The term, which embraces several distinct "tribes" or peoples, in particular the Ngaanyatjarra, Pitjantjatjara and Yankunytjatjara groups, is pronounced with the stress on the first syllable: [ˈaɳaŋʊ].

== The term ==
The original meaning of the word is "human being, person", "human body" in a number of eastern varieties of the Western Desert Languages (which are in the Pama–Nyungan group of languages), in particular Pitjantjatjara and Yankunytjatjara. It is now used as an Aboriginal endonym by a wide range of Western Desert Language (WDL) peoples to describe themselves. It is rarely or never applied to non-Aboriginal people when used in English, although the word now has a dual meaning in Pitjantjatjara and Yankunytjatjara. It has come to be used also as an exonym by non-Aboriginal Australians to refer to WDL-speaking groups or individuals.

With regard to the term's distribution and spelling, the following table shows the main WDL dialects in which it is used (left column) along with the word spelled according to the orthography of that dialect (right column).

Pitjantjatjara, Pintupi-Luritja	aṉangu
Southern (Titjikala) Luritja, Ngaanyatjarra, Ngaatjatjarra	yarnangu
Yankunytjatjara	yaṉangu

The reasons for the spelling variations are that some WDL dialects do not allow vowel-initial words—in these varieties the word begins with y; some orthographies use underlining (e.g. ṉ) to indicate a retroflex consonant, while others use a digraph (e.g. rn). Pitjantjatjara seems to be the best-known source for the word, but the underlining of the consonant is often ignored (or not understood) by English speakers, and is difficult to type, so the word is very commonly, but incorrectly, rendered as anangu.

== Country ==
The Aṉangu dwell primarily in the Central Western desert, to the south of the traditional lands of the Arrernte and Walpiri peoples.

== Culture ==
The inma is a cultural ceremony of Aṉangu women, involving song and dance and embodying the stories and designs of the tjukurpa (Ancestral Law, or Dreamtime). The ceremony carries camaraderie, joy, playfulness and seriousness, and may last for hours. There are many different inma, all profoundly significant to the culture.

=== Aṟa Irititja project ===
Aṟa Irititja (meaning "stories from a long time ago") is a project of Ara Irititja Aboriginal Corporation, which works in collaboration with the South Australian Museum and Anangu Pitjantjatjara Yankunytjatjara at Umuwa. The project began in 1994 with the aim of repatriating cultural items which had been "lost" over the years to Anangu of the Ngaanyatjarra, Pitjantjatjara and Yankunytjatjara lands. These included cultural artefacts, photographs, films and sound recordings. Some had ended up in the archives of public institutions, while others had been packed away in boxes and forgotten. By 2018, Ara Irititja had tracked down hundreds of thousands of items and made them available through interactive software, keeping them safe in a digital archive. Cultural priorities have been built into the software, and Anangu can navigate the database, add information, stories and reflections, and alert administrators to specific items requiring restricted access. This enables Anangu to have control over how their history and culture are presented to the world in future.

== See also ==
- Angas Downs Indigenous Protected Area
- Anangu Pitjantjatjara Yankunytjatjara (APY lands in South Australia)
- Maralinga, the home of Maralinga Tjarutja, and the site of the British nuclear tests in the 1950s

== Sources ==
- "Contact". Aṟa Irititja. 17 April 2012.
- Eckert, Paul; Hudson, Joyce (1988). Wangka Wiru: A handbook for the Pitjantjatjara language learner. Underdale SA: SACAE. ISBN 0-86803-230-1.
- Glass, Amee; Hackett, Dorothy (2003). Ngaanyatjarra & Ngaatjatjarra to English Dictionary. Alice Springs: IAD Press. ISBN 1-86465-053-2.
- Goddard, Cliff (1985). A Grammar of Yankunytjatjara. Alice Springs: IAD Press.
- Goddard, Cliff (1992). Pitjantjatjara/Yankunytjatjara to English Dictionary. Alice Springs: IAD Press. ISBN 0-949659-64-9.
- Griffin, Graham (2011). "Welcome to Aboriginal Land: Anangu Ownership and Management of Uluru-Kata National Park". In Chatty, Dawn; Colchester, Marcus (eds.). Conservation and Mobile Indigenous Peoples: Displacement, Forced Settlement and Sustainable Development. Berghahn Books. pp. 362–375. ISBN 978-1-782-38185-3.
- Hansen, KC; Hansen, LE (1992). Pintupi/Luritja Dictionary 3rd Edition. Alice Springs: IAD Press. ISBN 0-949659-63-0.
- "Inma (dance and song) performance". Tjanpi Desert Weavers. 2010.
- Kastrinou, Maria; Layton, Robert (2016). "The Politics of Reincarnation, Time and Sovereignty: A Comparative Anthropological Investigation of the Syrian Druze and Australian Anangu". In Gledhill, John (ed.). World Anthropologies in Practice: Situated Perspectives, Global Knowledge. Bloomsbury Publishing. ISBN 978-1-474-25262-1.
- Lindsay, Kirstyn (23 May 2017). "Tjungu Festival 2017: Anangu Senior Women share law and understanding of coming together". NITV Radio.
- Marsh, Walter (20 May 2019). "New gallery run for and by Anangu artists opens in Adelaide". The Adelaide Review.
- "Our Art Centres". APY Art Centre Collective. Archived from the original on 22 March 2020.
- "Overview". Aṟa Irititja. 17 April 2012.
- Valiquette, Hilaire, ed. (1993). A Basic Kukatja to English Dictionary. Balgo WA: Luurnpa Catholic School. ISBN 0-646-12453-6.
