= Mutitjulu =

Mutitjulu Northern Territory
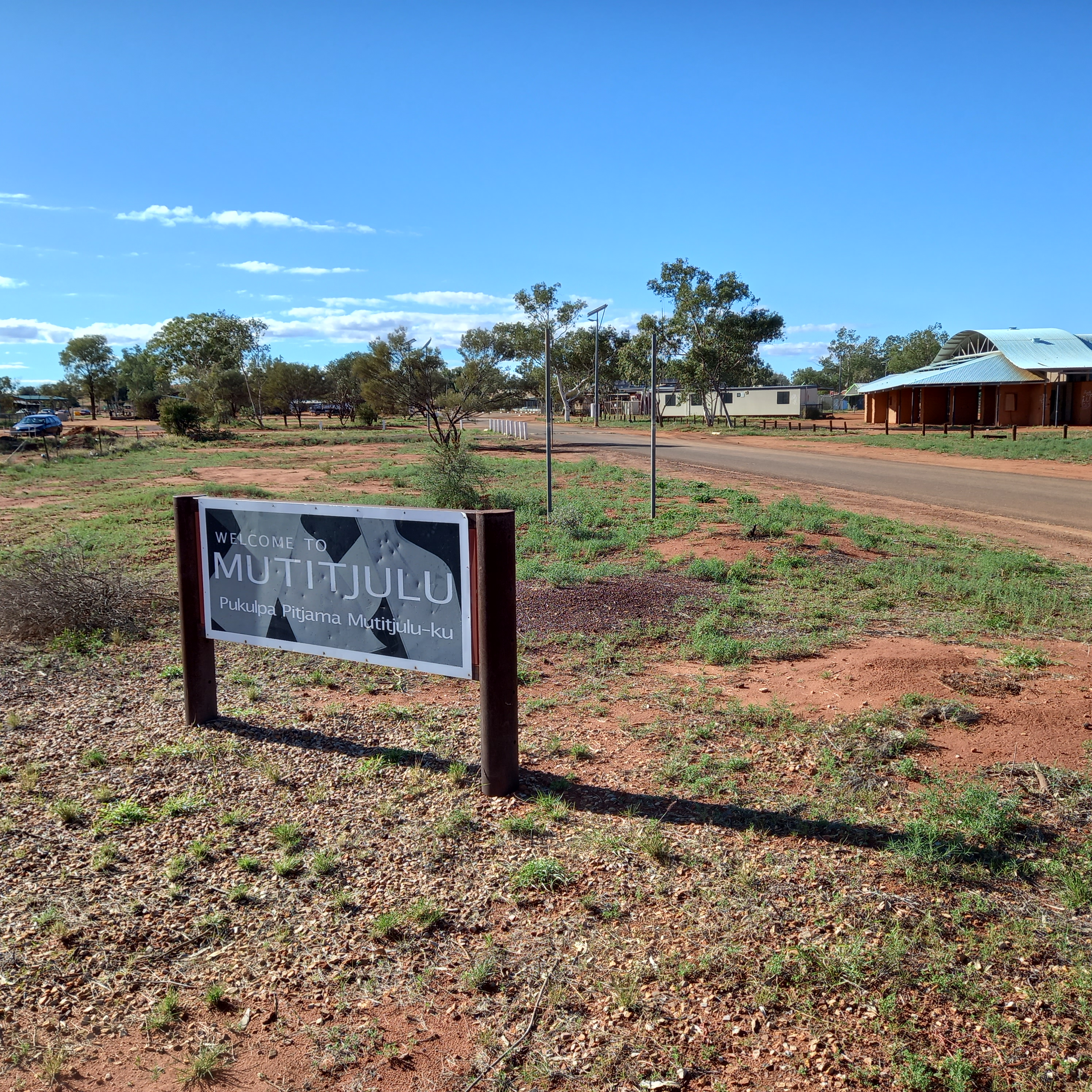
- Mutitjulu welcome sign

- Coordinates: 25°21′03″S 131°03′59″E
- Population: 296 (2011 census)
- Postcode(s): 0872
- Elevation: 523 m (1,716 ft)
- Location: 1,433 km (890 mi) S of Darwin; 14 km (9 mi) SW of Yulara; 89 km (55 mi) N of Amata; 350 km (217 mi) SW of Alice Springs
- LGA(s): MacDonnell Shire
- Territory electorate(s): Namatjira
- Federal division(s): Lingiari
Mean max temp	Mean min temp	Annual rainfall
38.5 °C; 101 °F	4.7 °C; 40 °F	217 mm 8.5 in

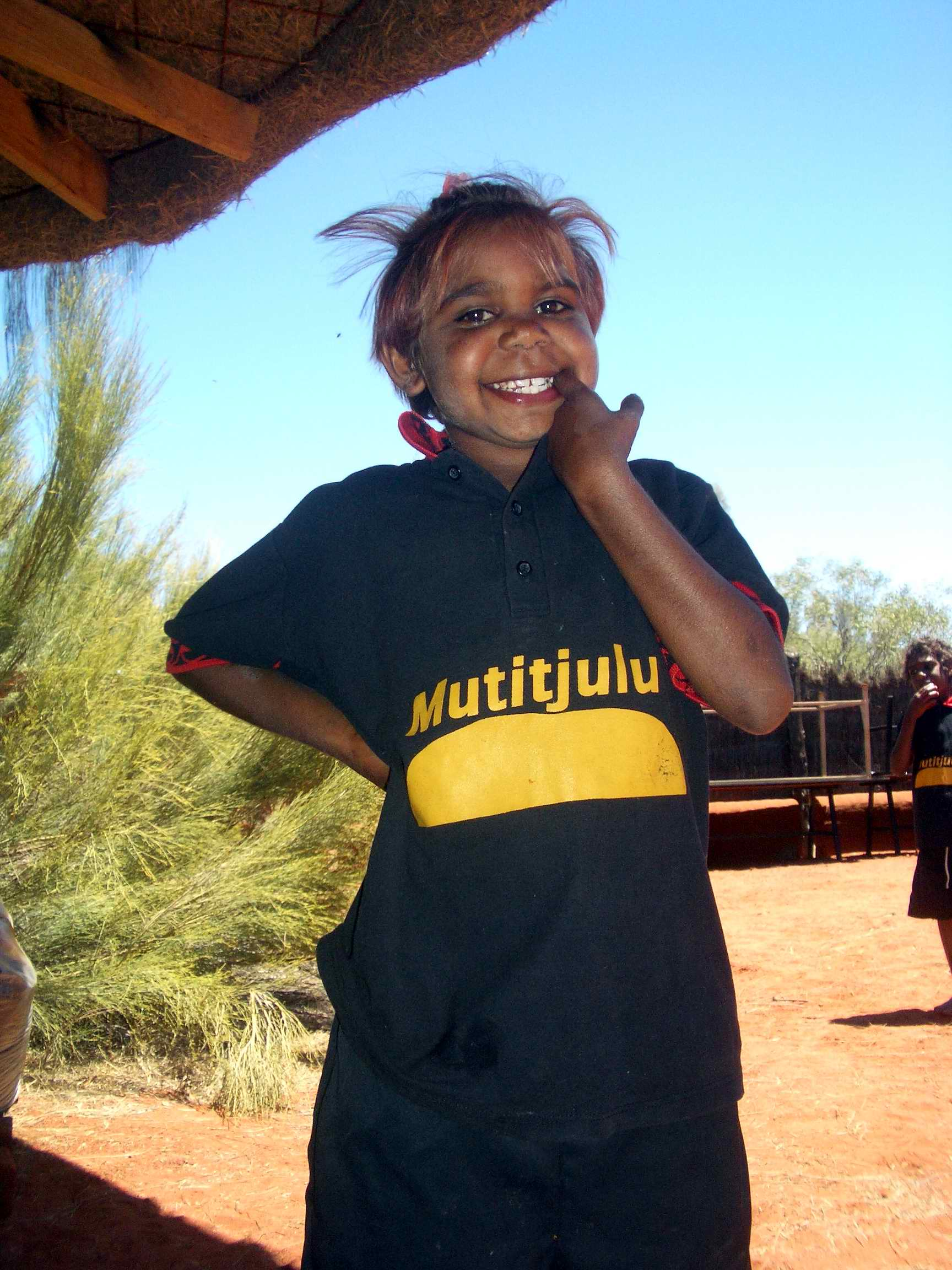
Girl at Mutitjulu (2005)

Mutitjulu is an Aboriginal Australian community in the Northern Territory of Australia located at the eastern end of Uluṟu (also known as Ayers Rock). It is named after a knee-shaped water-filled rock hole at the base of Uluṟu, and is located in the Uluṟu-Kata Tjuṯa National Park. Its people are traditional owners and joint managers of the park with Parks Australia. At the 2011 census, Mutitjulu had a population of 296, of which 218 (71.2%) were Aboriginal.

The majority of the Anangu (people) are Pitjantjatjara but there are also associated Yankunytjatjara, Luritja, and Ngaanyatjarra people with the languages spoken being Pitjantjatjara, Luritja, and Yankunytjatjara. Arrernte people also have a traditional relationship with Uluṟu.

== Tourism ==
Mutitjulu community run a number of guided tours for tourists visiting Uluṟu, who show tourists certain sites, and share Tjukurpa the story of Uluṟu, as well as of its inhabitants. These tours are called Anangu Tours, from the Pitjantjatjara word Anangu which means "people".

Access to the community is controlled by Anangu, who do not allow visitors to go to Mutitjulu community without permission. The community reserves the right to forbid visitors from entering their land.

The people of Mutitjulu are also the traditional owners of Uluṟu, and have an art exhibition there where they sell paintings and other artefacts.

== Economy ==
Much of the economy of Mutitjulu comes from tourism at Uluṟu and nearby Yulara, a small proportion of which is funnelled back to the local economy. Despite this, Mutitjulu is not wealthier than most other Indigenous Australian communities.

== Art centre ==
Maruku Arts & Crafts is a large and successful Aboriginal Australian-owned and -operated enterprise, run by Anangu (people of the Western and Central Deserts of Australia) since about 1990. It has a warehouse based in Mutitjulu, a retail gallery at Uluṟu-Kata Tjuṯa National Park Cultural Centre, as well as a market stall in Yulara town square. Its artwork consists mainly of paintings and woodcarvings. With about 900 artists in the collective, it provides an important source of income living in remote communities across central Australia. It seeks to "keep culture strong and alive, for future generations of artists, and [to] make culture accessible in an authentic way to those that seek a more in-depth understanding".

In May 2017, the artwork surrounding the signatures on the Uluru Statement from the Heart was created by artists from Maruku, led by Rene Kulitja, and painted by artists Christine Brumby, Charmaine Kulitja, and Happy Reid. This work was represented in lights at the Parrtjima light festival in Alice Springs in April 2023.

Maruku is one of ten Indigenous-owned and -governed enterprises that go to make up the APY Art Centre Collective, established in 2013.

== Mutitjulu Band ==
The Mutitjulu Band is led by Kimberley Taylor and David Honeymoon. They have performed at the Araluen Arts Centre in Alice Springs, at a NAIDOC event in Mutitjulu, at Voyagers resort in Yulara. They subsequently had songs recorded at the ABC recording studios in Sydney, and have grown in popularity.

== Education ==
The community has a school which services students from Year 1 to Year 7, and a high school, Nyangatjatjara College. The cultural traditions of Mutitjulu dictate that once reaching adolescence, children must be taught only with peers of the same sex. Nyangatjatjara College is a boarding school, and hosts the young men and young women of the community separately in consecutive semesters.

As with housing and health, education standards at Mutitjulu, are far lower than the Australian average.

== Language ==
Languages spoken are Pitjantjatjara, Luritja and Yankunytjatjara. Communication between the languages, however, is not difficult as most residents speak several languages and these Aboriginal languages are closely related, all being mutually intelligibly varieties of the Western Desert Language.

Efforts are made to preserve traditional customs, including traditional languages, but some English is spoken by most residents. The level of English literacy by Mutitjulu residents is higher than in many Indigenous Australian communities primarily due to the regular exposure to tourists at Uluṟu.

== Relationship to Uluṟu ==
Many stories have been told by Indigenous Australians from all around Central Australia about Uluṟu. Some of these stories are recreated in paintings and artwork, and many relate to the dreamtime. Uluṟu is seen as having an explanation for why we are humans, and the stories help to describe much of the surrounding flora and fauna.

=== Climbing of Uluṟu ===
The local Indigenous community from 1990 requested that visitors respect the sacred status of Uluṟu by not climbing the rock, with signs posted to this effect in late 1989. In 2017 the Uluṟu-Kata Tjuṯa National Park board decided unanimously to ban the activity, from October 26, 2019.

=== Ownership of Uluṟu ===
The Anangu consider themselves caretakers rather than owners of Uluṟu. For many years, Uluṟu was controlled by non-Aboriginal Australians, with motels placed close by. Traditional owners who had been forced out of the national park returned and settled at Mutitjulu, and worked towards restoring their land rights. Tourist facilities have been moved about 24 km north to Yulara, just outside the national park boundary.

== Title handback ==
Title to the Uluṟu-Kata Tjuṯa National Park was returned to the traditional owners on 26 October 1985.
