= Ngaatjatjarra dialect =

Australian Aboriginal dialect of the Western Desert language

Ngaatjatjarra
- Nga:da
- Region: Western Australia
- Ethnicity: Ngaatjatjarra
- Native speakers: (989 cited 1996)
- Language family: Pama–Nyungan: Wati; Western Desert; Ngaatjatjarra
- Signed forms: Ngada Sign Language

Language codes
- ISO 639-3: –
- Glottolog: None
- AIATSIS: A43
- ELP: Ngaatjatjara

Ngaatjatjarra (also Ngaatjatjara, Ngaadadjarra) is an Australian Aboriginal dialect of the Western Desert language. It is spoken in the Western Desert cultural bloc which covers about 600,000 square kilometres of the central and central-western desert.

It is very similar to its close neighbours Ngaanyatjarra, Pitjantjatjara and Pintupi, with which it is highly mutually intelligible.

Most Ngaatjatjarra live in the communities of Warburton, Warakurna, Tjukurla or Kaltukatjara.

== Name ==
The name Ngaatjatjarra derives from the word ngaatja 'this' which, combined with the comitative suffix -tjarra means something like 'ngaatja-having'. This distinguishes it from its near neighbour Ngaanyatjarra which has ngaanya for 'this'.

== Phonology ==
=== Vowels ===
Orthography is in brackets.

	Front	Back
High	i ⟨i⟩ iː ⟨ii⟩	ʊ ⟨u⟩ uː ⟨uu⟩
Low	a ⟨a⟩ aː ⟨aa⟩	

== Sign language ==
The Ngaatjatjarra have (or had) a signed form of their language, though it is not clear from records that it was particularly well-developed compared to other Australian Aboriginal sign languages.
