= Luritja dialect =

Aboriginal Australian language

Luritja
- Region: Western Australia, Northern Territory: Papunya, Kings Canyon, Aputula
- Ethnicity: Luritja
- Native speakers: 1,300 (2021 census)
- Language family: Pama-Nyungan: Wati; Western Desert; Luritja

Language codes
- ISO 639-3: piu Shared with Pintupi
- Glottolog: pint1250
- AIATSIS: C7.1

The Luritja dialect is the language of the Luritja people, an Aboriginal Australian group indigenous to parts of the Northern Territory and Western Australia. It is one of several dialects in the Western Desert language group.

== Name ==
The name luritja is thought to derive from the Arrernte word lurinya, 'foreigner'. It appears to have originally been applied by Arrernte speakers to people of the Western Desert Language group who had relocated onto Arrernte lands in the process of moving (or being moved) from remote desert areas to the region closer to Alice Springs. Over time younger generations have taken on the term as their ethnonym, possibly unaware of its origin.

== Area ==
The Luritja lands include areas to the west and south of Alice Springs, extending around the edge of Arrernte country. The area surrounding Papunya, including Mount Liebig is often referred to as Papunya Luritja, both in land and language, while areas to the south-east around Aputula and Maryvale are often referred to as Titjikala Luritja (Maryvale is the name of the cattle station on Titjikala land). The area around Ulpanyali and Watarrka National Park (Kings Canyon) is also referred to as Luritja country and the dialect of Luritja spoken there is referred to as Southern Luritja (it is identical to Titjikala Luritja). The variety of Luritja spoken at Kintore is often referred to as Pintupi/Luritja.

== Dialects ==
=== Papunya Luritja ===
Papunya Luritja is the variety of Luritja spoken around the community of Papunya, and also west through Mount Liebig to Kintore. Like Luritja generally, Papunya Luritja is a dialect of the Western Desert Language and is closely related to the Pintupi language of the area around Kintore and further west. It was originally believed that Luritja generally was referred to as Papunya Luritja. The language existed before the colonization of the area, and was the common language for communication across a number of groups. has probably also been influenced by western varieties of Arrernte as well as Warlpiri.

=== Titjikala Luritja ===
This variety is also a dialect of the Western Desert Language spoken in Titjikala. While it is quite similar to Papunya Luritja, it shows notable differences probably having been derived mostly from Pitjantjatjara as well as being influenced by Antakarinya and the more southern varieties of Arrernte.

== Phonology ==
=== Consonants ===
	Peripheral		Laminal	Apical	
	Labial	Velar	(Alveolo-) palatal	Alveolar	Retroflex
Plosive	p	k	t̠ʲ	t	ʈ
Nasal	m	ŋ	n̠ʲ	n	ɳ
Lateral			l̠ʲ	l	ɭ
Rhotic				ɾ	
Approximant	w		j	ɻ	

- /ɾ/ can range to a trill [r] in emphatic speech among speakers.
- /ɻ/ can also be heard as a retroflex tap [ɽ], or an alveolar glide [ɹ] among speakers.

=== Vowels ===
	Front	Back
High	i iː	u uː
Low	a aː	

== Vocabulary ==
The following are designated as Luritja words by R. H. Mathews.

- kanala (grey kangaroo)
- katu (father)
- malu (red kangaroo) (Note: Willshire's marloo. (Willshire 1891, p. 44))
- papa inura (wild dog)
- papa (tame dog) (Note: Willshire's pup-pa. (Willshire 1891, p. 44))
- yako (mother)

== Sources ==
- Mathews, R. H. (1906). "Notes on some native tribes of Australia". Journal and Proceedings of the Royal Society of New South Wales. 40: 95–129. doi:10.5962/p.359471. S2CID 259733139.
- Willshire, William Henry (1891). The Aborigines of Central Australia, with vocabularies of the dialects spoken by the natives of Lake Amadeus and of the western territory of Central Australia. Adelaide: Bristow, Government Printer.
