= Manyjilyjarra dialect =

Wati dialect of Australia

Manyjilyjarra
- Manjiljarra, Mandjildjara
- Region: near Jigalong, Western Australia
- Ethnicity: Mandjildjara
- Native speakers: 311 (2016 census); 65 (2021 census)
- Language family: Pama–Nyungan: Wati; Western Desert; Manyjilyjarra
- Signed forms: Manjiljarra Sign Language

Language codes
- ISO 639-3: mpj – Martu Wangka
- Glottolog: None
- AIATSIS: A51.1
- ELP: Manjiljarra; Manjiljarra

Manyjilyjarra (Manjiljarra, Mandjildjara) is an Australian Aboriginal language, generally considered a dialect of the Western Desert language.

It is often classified as a distinct language among the Wati languages of the large Pama–Nyungan family of Australia.

It is one of the components of the Martu Wangka koine.

== Sign language ==
Most of the peoples of central Australia have (or at one point had) signed forms of their languages. Among the Western Desert peoples, sign language has been reported specifically for Manjiljarra, though it is not clear from records how well developed it was.

== Phonology ==
=== Vowels ===
	Front	Back
High	i iː	u uː
Low	a aː	

- /i/ has allophones [i] or [ɪ] in free variation. Mainly as [ɪ] in stressed syllables, and as [i] in word-final position.
- /u/ has the allophones [u] or [ʊ] in free variation. When following or preceding velar consonants, it may be realized as [o].
- /a/ is typically pronounced as [a] or [ɑ] in free variation. When in unstressed syllables, it can be pronounced as [ʌ]. When following the glide /w/ or a labial or velar consonant, it can be realized as [ɒ]. When following palatal consonants, it can be realized as [æ] or [e]. When preceding glides /w, j/, it may be heard with vowel off-glides as [aᵘ, aⁱ].
- The phoneme sequence /aji/ may be realized as a mid-close front long sound [eː].

=== Consonants ===
	Peripheral		Laminal	Apical	
	Bilabial	Velar	Palatal	Alveolar	Retroflex
Plosive	p	k	c	t	ʈ
Nasal	m	ŋ	ɲ	n	ɳ
Lateral			ʎ	l	ɭ
Trill/Tap				ɾ ~ r	
Approximant	w		j		ɻ

- Stops /p, t, ʈ, c, k/ have voiced allophones [b, d, ɖ, ɟ, ɡ] when following nasal sounds, or may be heard as voiced in free variation when following approximant sounds. Voiced stop allophones [b, ɟ, ɡ] may alternate with voiced fricative allophones [β, ʝ, ɣ] in intervocalic positions.
- Palatal sounds /c, ɲ/ may alternate with laminal-alveolar sounds [t̻, n̻] when before /a, aː/ in word-initial position.
- When preceding a word-final /u/, most consonant sounds occur as rounded [Cʷ].
- /r/ is typically heard as a trill [r], and is mostly heard as a flap [ɾ] in word-medial or intervocalic positions. In word-final positions, it is commonly heard as a voiceless trill [r̥].
