= Putijarra dialect =

Wati language of Australia

Putijarra
- Puditara
- Region: south of Jigalong, Western Australia
- Ethnicity: Putijarra
- Native speakers: 4 (2004)
- Language family: Pama–Nyungan: Wati; Putijarra

Language codes
- ISO 639-3: mpj – Martu Wangka
- Glottolog: None
- AIATSIS: A54
- ELP: Putijarra; Putijarra

Putijarra is one of the Wati languages of the large Pama–Nyungan family of Australia. It is sometimes counted as a dialect of the Western Desert Language, but is classified as a distinct language in Bowern.

It is one of the components of the Martu Wangka koine.
