= Yulparija =

Wati language of Australia

- Yulparitja, Yulbarija, Yulparirra
- Region: Bidyadanga, north of Jigalong, Western Australia
- Native speakers: 33 (2021 census)
- Language family: Pama–Nyungan: Wati; Yulparija

Language codes
- ISO 639-3: None (mis)
- Glottolog: yulp1239
- AIATSIS: A67
- ELP: Yulparija; 5245

Yulparija is one of the Wati languages of the large Pama–Nyungan family of Australia. It is sometimes counted as a dialect of the Western Desert language, but is classified as a distinct language in Bowern.

It is one of the components of the Martu Wangka koine.

== Phonology ==
Yulparija has a typical phonemic inventory for languages of the Kimberley area. It uses 17 consonants in five distinct places of articulation.

Consonant phonemes
	Bilabial	Apico-alveolar	Apico-post-alveolar	Lamino-palatal	Dorso-velar
Stops	p ⟨p⟩	t ⟨t⟩	ʈ ⟨rt⟩	c ⟨j⟩	k ⟨k⟩
Nasals	m ⟨m⟩	n ⟨n⟩	ɳ ⟨rn⟩	ɲ ⟨ny⟩	ŋ ⟨ng⟩
Laterals		l ⟨l⟩	ɭ ⟨rl⟩	ʎ ⟨ly⟩	
Taps		ɾ ⟨rr⟩			
Glides	w ⟨w⟩		ɻ ⟨r⟩	j ⟨y⟩	

=== Vowels ===
Yulparija uses a three vowel system, with a length contrast for the open vowel [a] and the close back vowel [u].

Vowel phonemes
	Front	Back
Close	i [i]	u [u], uu [uː]
Open	a [a], a [aː]	
