= Kukatja language =

Kukatja or Gugadja may be,

- The Kukatja dialect of the Western Desert language spoken south of Balgo, Western Australia
- The Luritja dialect of the Western Desert Language, spoken in the Northern Territory
- The Kukatj language of Queensland
