= Western Desert (disambiguation) =

The Western Desert is part of the Sahara Desert in Egypt, west of the River Nile.

Western Desert may also refer to:

- Western Desert (Iraq), part of the Syrian Desert
- Western Desert Art Movement, an Aboriginal Australian art movement originating with Papunya Tula
- Western Desert cultural bloc, a cultural region in Australia
- Western Desert language, a cluster of Aboriginal Australian languages spoken in Western Australia, South Australia and the Northern Territory

== See also ==
- Western Desert campaign of the Second World War
- Western Desert Force, World War II
