= Antakirinja =

Antakirinja or Antakarinya may refer to:

- Antakirinja people
- Antakarinya language
