= Kartutjarra language =

Wati language of Australia

Kartutjarra
- Kardutjara
- Region: near Jigalong, Western Australia
- Ethnicity: Kartudjara
- Native speakers: 21 (2016 census); 6 speakers of pure Kartujarra (2006)
- Language family: Pama–Nyungan: Wati; Kartutjarra
- Signed forms: Kartutjarra Sign Language

Language codes
- ISO 639-3: mpj – Martu Wangka
- Glottolog: kart1247
- AIATSIS: A51
- ELP: Kartujarra; 6689

Kartutjarra (Kardutjara) is one of the Wati languages of the large Pama–Nyungan family of Australia. It is sometimes counted as a dialect of the Western Desert Language, but is classified as a distinct language in Bowern.

It is one of the components of the Martu Wangka koine.

== Sign language ==
Most of the peoples of central Australia have (or at one point had) signed forms of their languages. Among the Western Desert peoples, sign language has been reported specifically for Kardutjara. Signed Kardutjara is known to have been well-developed.
