= Wangkajunga dialect =

Variety of the Western Desert language

Wangkajunga
- wangkajunga
- Region: Northwest Western Australia
- Ethnicity: Wangkajunga
- Native speakers: 6 (2021 census)
- Language family: Pama–Nyungan: Wati; Western Desert; Wangkajunga

Language codes
- ISO 639-3: mpj
- Glottolog: wang1288
- AIATSIS: A87

Wangkajunga is a dialect of the Western Desert language.

Traditionally, its speakers lived in the north-eastern section of the Great Sandy Desert and the Canning Stock Route, and to the south and west of Lake Gregory. These are areas that are considered deserts but have many water holes that speakers travel between, two examples being Christmas Creek and Fitzroy Crossing.

While older speakers continue to use Wangkajunga as their primary language, younger speakers tend to understand Wangkajunga but use different languages in their daily lives. For example, many younger speakers primarily use an English-based creole commonly referred to as the Fitzroy Valley Kriol.

The name 'Wangkajunga' only appears to have emerged in the 1970s. This name is said to have been based on the words wangka meaning 'talk' or 'word' and junga meaning 'correct' or 'straight,' so when put together, the language name essentially means 'the correct language.' There is still some debate on how this name should be spelled, as it has been recorded differently by different linguists studying the language.

== Phonology ==
=== Vowels ===
Martu Wangka contains three contrastive vowels, which may be either short or long. Long vowels are less common and usually occur either on the first syllable of a word or as the ending of a monosyllabic word. The chart below illustrates this:

Vowel phonemes
| | Front | Back |
|---|---|---|
| High | i iː | u uː |
| Low | a aː | |

- /i/ has allophones [i], [ɪ] in free variation. When following a palatal consonant, or preceding a retroflex continuant /ɻ/, it can be realised as [ɛ].
- /u/ has the allophones [u], [ʊ]. When following or preceding palatal consonants, it may be realised as more fronted to [ʉ].
- /a/ is typically pronounced as [a]. When in unstressed positions as a second syllable of a three syllable word, it can be pronounced as [ə] and word-finally as [ʌ]. When following the glide /w/, or preceding a velar consonant, it can be realised as [ɒ]. When between two laterals, it can be realised as [æ].

=== Consonants ===
There are 17 consonants in Martu Wangka, dispersed over five different places and six manners of articulation. Speakers of Martu Wangka generally do not make distinctions between voiced and voiceless stops. The apico-alveolar and apico-retroflex consonants are very similar and can be pronounced differently depending on the speaker, so it is often difficult to normalize the way these sounds are recorded.

Consonant phonemes
| | Peripheral | | Laminal | Apical | |
| | Bilabial | Velar | Palatal | Alveolar | Retroflex |
|---|---|---|---|---|---|
| Plosive | p | k | ɟ/c | t | ʈ |
| Nasal | m | ŋ | ɲ | n | ɳ |
| Lateral | | | ʎ | l | ɭ |
| Tap | | | | ɾ | |
| Approximant | w | | j | | ɻ |

- /k/ can have a voiced allophone [ɡ] when occurring after nasal continuants, or in different intervocalic positions. It may also be heard as a voiced fricative [ɣ] in intervocalic positions.
- /ɟ/ can have a voiceless fricative allophone [ç] when occurring intervocalically.
- /ʈ/ can also be heard as tap sounds [ɾ~ɽ] in various intervocalic positions.

=== Syllable structure ===
In Martu Wangka, most words contain two or more syllables, and most words end in vowels. Although some words may end in an apical nasal or lateral consonant, most words that would end in a consonant are appended with an epenthetic syllable '-pa' to avoid ending the word on a consonant. The most standard syllable template is CV(V)(C). The chart below shows various syllabic templates, along with examples.

| Template | Example | Translation |
|---|---|---|
| CV | ju.nu | waterhole |
| CVV | muu.ngu | fly |
| CVC | kurn.tal | niece |
| CVVC | kaarn.ka | crow |

=== Stress ===
Martu Wangka has stress similar to that of other languages in its family: primary stress usually falls on the first syllable of a word, and secondary stress usually falls on the second syllable after the primary stressed syllable (essentially alternating between stressed and unstressed, marked starting from the left). The final syllable of a word is usually unstressed.

== Morphology ==
=== Nominals ===
In Martu Wangka, nominal morphology has affixation, reduplication, compounding, and case marking. The usual formula for constructing a noun is

nominal word = nominal root – (derivation) (derivation) – inflection (inflection)

==== Derivational suffixes ====
Nominals in Martu Wangka do not all have derivational suffixes, but when they do, these suffixes attach directly to the nominal root and then are followed by any inflectional suffixes. The usual derivational suffixes function to indicate a nominal having or lacking something, the related timing and spacing, comparison of certain properties, or number. The table below shows examples of some of the common derivational affixes associated with these groupings. The word containing the relevant suffix is bolded in each line of the gloss.

| Function | Suffix | Meaning | Example |
|---|---|---|---|
| Having/Lacking a thing or property | -kurlu | having | yirna pampa **warta-kurlu** ya-nu {old man} blind **stick-HAV** go-PST 'The blind man walked with a stick.' |
| Having/Lacking a thing or property | -pinti | associated thing | jina-pinti foot-THING 'shoe' |
| Associated Time and Space | -jarra | associated time | munga-jarra dark-ASST 'night-time' |
| Associated Time and Space | -puru | temporal | kalya-puru water-TEMP 'rainy season' |
| Comparison of Properties | -yuru | similar | Ma-nu wirrupu-ngu **yampaly-yuru** **ngaa-yuru** get-PST throw-PST **flour-SIM** **DEM-SIM** 'She got **stuff the same as this flour** and sprinkled it.' |
| Comparison of Properties | -munu | contradictive | **Kumpupaja-munu** nganayi minyili mirrka **bush.tomato-CONTR** HES minyili fruit 'It's **not a bush tomato,** it's um, minyili fruit.' |
| Numbers | -marlu | numerative | **Ngana-marlu**-ya nyin-in-pa? **INDEF-NUM**-3PL.SBJ stay-PRES-PA '**How many** are there?' |
| Numbers | -rarra | related kin (pair) | nyupa-rarra spouse-PAIR 'husband and wife' |

=== Verbs ===
Martu Wangka contains around 70 basic verbs that can serve as verbal roots and then an indefinite amount of complex verbs formed through various morphological processes. These verbs contain a wide variety of meanings including but not limited to actions, motions, physical positions, sensations, and utterances. The usual formula for constructing a verb is

verbal word = (direction) (preverb) verbal root (derivation) (derivation) inflection (directional affixes)

==== Derivational affixes ====
Derivational verb morphology in Martu Wangka consists of various causatives, inchoatives, and directional affixes. Causitives include suffixes like '-ma', which creates a transitive verb from a nominal, and '-ju', which indicates that something has been put on, over, into, etc. Inchoatives serve as change-of-state verbs and modify nominals that describe various states of existence like being alive or cold. Directional affixes are used to modify existing verbs and indicate the type or direction of action.

| Type | Affix | Function/meaning | Example | |
| Type | Affix | Function/meaning | Nominal/verbal root | Derived verb |
|---|---|---|---|---|
| Causitive | -ma | forms a transitive verb from a nominal | junga 'straight' | junga-ma-rra '(subject) make (object) straight' |
| Causitive | -ju | 'cause to be put on, over, into, etc.' | tapurr 'hole' | tapurr-jurra 'put hole into something' |
| Inchoative | -arri | change of state | minjil 'orphan' | minjil-arri- '(subject) become an orphan, be bereft' |
| Inchoative | -rri | change of state | kayili 'north' | kayili-rri- 'turn around to the north' |
| Direction | maa- | 'away from' | yanin 'go' | Maa-yan-in-pa yawurta away-go-PRES-PA horse 'The horse is going away.' |

==== Inflectional affixes ====
Inflectional affixes on verbs are used to indicate tense and how the speaker feels about the action that the verbal root describes. Tense affixes include indicators of present, past, future, perfective, and imperfective tenses. Feeling affixes can be used to inflect when a speaker wants something to happen, is trying to make something happen, believes that something should happen, and to discuss hypothetical scenarios.

There are four different conjugation classes that determine how verbs realize various inflectional morphemes: the ø class, wa class, rra class, and la class. These classes are organized by shared characteristics of the imperative form of the verb.

=== Reduplication ===
There is both nominal and verbal reduplication in Martu Wangka, which is usually used to generate a new word with related meaning, but can also be used to emphasize certain actions or traits. Nominal reduplication has two types: reduplication and frozen reduplication. With reduplication, the nominal is repeated, which creates a new reduplicated nominal. With frozen reduplication, only the reduplicated form of the nominal is in the language and the non-reduplicated form does not exist.

Verbal reduplication can be both partial, full, and frozen reduplication. To form a reduplicated verb, usually the verb root or the preverb of a compound verb is reduplicated. It is typically used when creating a word for an action that repeats itself, such as going around in circles.

Examples of nominal reduplication
| Type | Nominal | Reduplicated nominal |
|---|---|---|
| Reduplication | ngunju 'chin' | ngunjungunju 'beard' |
| Reduplication | juku 'small' | jukujuku 'very small' |
| Frozen Reduplication | | jurnjurnpa 'brain' |

Examples of verbal reduplication
| Type | Verb | Reduplicated verb |
|---|---|---|
| Root Reduplication | yinala 'collect' | yinalyinala 'gather lots' |
| Preverb Reduplication | kurtiyarra 'turn over' | kurtikurtiyarra 'roll over, somersault' |
| Frozen Reduplication | | mirrimirriwa 'itch' |

=== Compounding ===
Compound nominals are formed in two ways: either two independent roots are put together to form a new word with a separate meaning, or one independent root is put together with another root that does not contain independent meaning. The majority of compound nominals are words for various plants and animals, but they are also formed to describe words originally not in Martu Wangka.

Compound verbs consist of a preverb, which can be either a nominal or an independent class, and a verbal root. Verbal roots are simple verbs that contain the core meaning of the compound verb. Some examples of compounding on verbals roots are illustrated below.

Compound nominal examples
| Noun 1 | Noun 2 | Compound noun |
|---|---|---|
| mangka 'hair' | wala 'egg' | mangkawala 'hat' |
| murti 'knee' | tikil 'dry' | murtitikil 'camel' |

Compound verb examples
| Verbal root | Preverb | Compound verb |
|---|---|---|
| -jurra put | kurlpa vomit | kurlpajurra put vomit on something |
| -jurra put | yirri [not an independent verb] | yirrijurra sic/put dogs onto game |
| -puwa hit | kinil phlegm | kinilpuwa phlegm hits |
| -puwa hit | karrarta anxious | karrartan-puwa frighten (hit with fright) |
| -kati carry | yaliny shoulder | yaliny-kati carry across the shoulders |
| -kati carry | kawan forgetful | parra-kawan-kati wandering around stupidly |

=== Case and agreement ===
==== Grammatical case marking ====
The system of case and agreement in Martu Wangka is Ergative-Absolutive. The suffix associated with the absolutive case is -ø, which indicates lack of a suffix, and the suffixes associated with the ergative case are -lu when preceded by a vowel and -ju or -tu when preceded by a consonant. Martu Wangka also contains a third grammatical case known as the dative case, which serves to mark the purpose of an action and is suffixed with -ku. The examples below show these three types of grammatical case marking.

| Case | Suffix | Example |
|---|---|---|
| **Ergative** | -lu, -ju, -tu | Puntu-lu wirta-ø pu-ngu man-ERG dog-ABS hit-PST 'The man hit the dog.' |
| **Absolutive** | -ø | Tuju-ø ya-nu woman-ABS go-PST 'The woman went.' |
| **Dative** | -ku | Puntu-ra ya-nin-pa mirrka-ku man-3SG.DAT go-PRES-PA food-DAT 'The man is going for food.' |

These grammatical cases are particularly important in a language like Martu Wangka because it has very free word order, so these case markings serve to indicate the functions of and relationships between nominals in a sentence. For example, these cases can indicate subject and object, agent and experiencer (of an action), force of an action (such as when an object causes something to happen instead of a human), purpose of an action, and even beneficiary of an action.

==== Semantic case marking ====
While the ergative and absolutive markings serve primarily grammatical functions, Martu Wangka also contains case markings that can be loosely categorized as semantic markings. Semantic case markings are considered an extension of the argument and are used primarily to relate the argument to a location. For example, the locative case indicates the location of an argument, the perlative case describes an object moving along a path within a location, the allative case describes an object moving to a location, and the ablative case describes an object moving away from a location.

== Syntax ==
=== Word order ===
Martu Wangka has free word order, meaning that there is no grammatical basic word order. Instead, words are ordered semantically and the most important parts of the sentence come the earliest in the sentence. For example, new information introduced into a conversation tends to come before information that has already been discussed. In a narrative about a journey, information about direction and distance comes first because those are the most important things for travelers to know. Some examples are shown below.

S V O
Tuju-lu-pula-jananya pulturr-pu-ngu pura
woman-ERG-3DU.SBJ-3PL.OBJ thread-hit-PST bush.tomato
'The women threaded the bush tomatoes.'

S O V
Tuju-lu kalyu-ø jikin-in-pa
woman-ERG water-ABS drink-PRES-PA
'The woman is drinking water.'

O {} S V {}
Jina-ya-pulyana wirta pinga-lu paja-rnu kujarra-ngulyu
foot-3PL.SBJ-3DU.OBJ dog ant-ERG bite-PST two-CERT
'The ants bit the dog's feet, the two of them.'

V S O
Kampangu-rni nguyumpara-lu jina-ø
burn-PST-1SG.OBJ fire-ERG foot-ABS
'The fire burnt my foot.'

=== Questions ===
Martu Wangka has tag questions, in which certain questions are followed by a tag that indicates the type of question. The tag always comes at the end of the question. For example, the kurlu tag comes at the end of a yes/no question and the 'you know' tag, which is borrowed from English, is common at the end of rhetorical questions as an afterthought.

| -kurlu | 'you know' |
|---|---|
| Kuka jii nyunmi kurlu game DEM cooked TAG; That meat is cooked, isn't it? | Mirrka-laju yanga nga-lkun-ma jirilypaja {you know} plant.food-1PL.EX.SBJ DEM eat-IRR-PSTIMP plant.food TAG; A plant food, that one we used to eat call 'jirilypaja', you know. |

Martu Wangka also has interrogative pronouns ngana, wanja, jaatu, and nyangula, which translate to the English words 'what,' 'where', and 'when', respectively. These interrogative nominals always come at the start of a clause.

Nyanagula-n ya-nku
when-2SG.SBJ go-FUT
When will you go?
