= Tjupan dialect =

Wati language of Australia

Tjupan
- Region: Lake Carnegie (Western Australia)
- Ethnicity: Tjupan
- Native speakers: 6 (2018)
- Language family: Pama–Nyungan: Wati; Tjupan

Language codes
- ISO 639-3: tjp
- Glottolog: pini1245 Lake Carnegie Western Desert
- AIATSIS: A31 Tjupan, A25 Birniridjara
- ELP: Tjupany

Tjupan (Tjupany) is one of the Wati languages of the large Pama–Nyungan family of Australia. It is sometimes counted as a dialect of the Western Desert Language, but is classified as a distinct language by Bowern.

The spelling "Tjupan" follows the Goldfields Language Centre and is used for a small dictionary published by the Ngalia Heritage Research Council. "Madoidja" (Madoitja) is a location name.

Extinct Birniridjara ("Pini") was close geographically and was reported to be mutually intelligible, but is undocumented and it is not known if it was closer to Tjupan than to other Western Desert languages.

Tjupan is classed as a highly endangered language, with only 6 fully fluent speakers remaining.
