= Warnman language =

Language of Western Australia

Warnman
- Wanman
- Region: Western Australia
- Ethnicity: Warnman people
- Native speakers: 9 (2021 census)
- Language family: Pama–Nyungan: Wati; Warnman

Language codes
- ISO 639-3: wbt
- Glottolog: wanm1242
- AIATSIS: A62
- ELP: Warnman

Warnman, also spelt Wanman, is a possibly extinct Australian Aboriginal language, of the Wati branch of the Pama–Nyungan family. It was spoken near Jigalong in Western Australia by the Warnman people (Warman), who are a subgroup of Martu people (Mardu).

Antakarinya might be closer to Wanman than it is to the Western Desert language.

== Sounds ==
Consonant inventory
	Bilabial	Alveolar	Retroflex	Palatal	Velar
Stop	p	t	ʈ	c	k
Nasal	m	n	ɳ	ɲ	ŋ
Lateral		l	ɭ	ʎ	
Trill		r			
Approximant	w		ɻ	j	

/c/ may also be heard as voiced [ɟ].

Vowel inventory
	Front	Central	Back
High	i, iː		u, uː
Low		a, aː	
