= Yankunytjatjara dialect =

Australian Aboriginal language

Yankunytjatjara
- Region: South Australia
- Ethnicity: Yankuntjatjarra
- Native speakers: 600 (2021 census)
- Language family: Pama–Nyungan: Wati; Western Desert; Yankunytjatjara

Language codes
- ISO 639-3: kdd
- Glottolog: yank1247
- AIATSIS: C4
- ELP: Yankunytjatjara

Yankunytjatjara (also Yankuntatjara, Jangkundjara, or Kulpantja) is an Australian Aboriginal language. It is one of the Wati languages, belonging to the large Pama–Nyungan family. It is one of the many varieties of the Western Desert Language, all of which are mutually intelligible.

Yankunytjatjara is spoken in the north-west of South Australia and is one of the most easterly of the Western Desert dialects, being spoken around the communities of Mimili, Indulkana and Fregon and across to Oodnadatta and Coober Pedy (although this latter is not on traditional Yankunytjatjara land).

== Dialects ==
Yankunytjatjara is one of the many dialects of the Western Desert language and is very similar to the better known, more widely spoken Pitjantjatjara. According to a study carried out mainly in Coober Pedy where many speakers of both varieties reside (although the town is on what was traditionally Arabana lands), young speakers of Yankunytjatjara often borrow words from English and also from Pitjantjatjara (which has expanded eastwards into Yankunytjatjara country and beyond). Yankunytjatjara shows some variation across its range with, for example, Northern Yankunytjatjara sharing features with Southern Luritja.

== Phonology ==
=== Vowels ===
	Front	Central	Back
Close	i ⟨i⟩ iː ⟨ii⟩		ʊ~u ⟨u⟩ uː ⟨uu⟩
Open		a ⟨a⟩ aː ⟨aa⟩	

- /i, a/ are realised as [ɪ, ɐ] when preceding laminal consonants.

=== Consonants ===
	Peripheral		Laminal	Apical	
	Bilabial	Velar	Palatal	Alveolar	Retroflex
Stop	p ⟨p⟩	k ⟨k⟩	c ⟨tj⟩	t ⟨t⟩	ʈ ⟨ṯ⟩
Nasal	m ⟨m⟩	ŋ ⟨ng⟩	ɲ ⟨ny⟩	n ⟨n⟩	ɳ ⟨ṉ⟩
Tap/Trill				ɾ~r ⟨r⟩	
Lateral			ʎ ⟨ly⟩	l ⟨l⟩	ɭ ⟨ḻ⟩
Approximant	w ⟨w⟩		j ⟨y⟩		ɻ ⟨ṟ⟩

- /r/ can be trilled [r] when pronounced emphatically, or may also occur as voiceless [r̥] in word-final position.

== Name ==
The name used for Yankunytjatjara is based on a single prominent word, the verb for 'come/go', which distinguishes it from its near neighbour, Pitjantjatjara. The latter has pitjantja (in the present tense pitjanyi) for this verb while Yankunytjatjara has yankunytja (present tense yananyi). The ending -tjara is the comitative suffix, and means 'having' or 'with'. Thus Yankunytjatjara means 'to have yankunytja' as opposed to Pitjantjatjara which has pitjantja.

Alternatively, the northernmost Yankunytjatjara and parts of Southern Luritja both have the word maṯu 'true' and so are sometimes grouped together as Maṯutjara to contrast them with the Southern Yankunytjatjara who use mula for 'true' and so can be referred to as Mulatjara. Another classification used by speakers groups Yankunytjatjara and Pitjantjatjara together as Nyangatjatjara as they both use nyangatja for the demonstrative 'this' or 'this one'; this contrasts them with Ngaanyatjara, which has ngaanya for the demonstrative and Nyanganyatjara varieties (still further west) which have nyanganya.

=== Pronunciation ===
The name Yankunytjatjara is usually pronounced (in normal, fast speech) with one of the repeated syllables -tja- deleted, thus: yankunytjara. In slow, careful speech all syllables will be pronounced.

== Status ==
There seems to be no exhaustive evidence on the vitality of Yankunytjatjara. McConvell & Thieberger found Yankunytjatjara to be endangered based mainly on the Census of 1996. In 2005 the National Indigenous Language Survey, based on a more comprehensive survey, concluded that Yankunytjatjara was 'definitely endangered'. Naessan, using the 2003 UNESCO framework, gave a mark of 22/23 out of 35 (in its most condensed spot), quite a low score. If some factors that Naessan feels are unimportant in most indigenous languages are ignored, Yankunytjatjara scores 14/15 out of 20 (in its densest area). However, he argues that since recent surveys have included these factors, they may be more helpful for cross referencing. To a lesser extent he feels that, since Western Desert people own some media sources (radio station etc.), such factors should be included. He concludes a 57–65% vitality.

Both schemas indicate that Yankunytjatjara shows symptoms of endangerment (although how endangered is a subject of debate), which coincides with the beliefs of the Yankunytjatjara elders that Naessan spoke with, as well as with the assessments of most linguists who have worked in the area.

== See also ==
- Australia in the Eurovision Song Contest 2024
