= Wawula dialect =

Wati language of Australia

Wawula
- Waula
- Region: south-east of Meekatharra
- Ethnicity: Wardal?, Madoidja?
- Language family: Pama–Nyungan: Wati; Wawula

Language codes
- ISO 639-3: –
- Glottolog: None
- AIATSIS: A29

Wawula is one of the Wati languages of the Pama–Nyungan family of Australia. It is sometimes counted as a dialect of the Western Desert Language, but is classified as a distinct language by Bowern and the Australian Institute of Aboriginal and Torres Strait Islander Studies.
