= Ngaanyatjarra dialect =

Australian Aboriginal language

Ngaanyatjarra
- Native to: Australia
- Region: Western Australia; Warburton Ranges.
- Ethnicity: Ngaanyatjarra
- Native speakers: 1,051 (2021 census)
- Language family: Pama–Nyungan: Wati; Western Desert; Ngaanyatjarra

Language codes
- ISO 639-3: ntj
- Glottolog: ngaa1240
- AIATSIS: A38
- ELP: Ngaanyatjarra

Ngaanyatjarra ([ˈŋɐːn̪ɐt̪ɐrɐ]; also Ngaanyatjara, Ngaanjatjarra) is a dialect of the Western Desert language spoken primarily by the Ngaanyatjarra people.

It is very similar to its close neighbour Ngaatjatjarra, with which it is highly mutually intelligible.

== Name ==
The name Ngaanyatjarra derives from the word ngaanya 'this' which, combined with the comitative suffix -tjarra means 'having ngaanya (as the word for 'this')'. This distinguishes it from its near neighbour Ngaatjatjarra, which has ngaatja for 'this'.

== Phonology ==
Orthography is in brackets.

=== Vowels ===
| | Front | Back |
|---|---|---|
| High | i ⟨i⟩ iː ⟨ii⟩ | ʊ ⟨u⟩ uː ⟨uu⟩ |
| Low | a ⟨a⟩ aː ⟨aa⟩ | |

- Before alveolar consonants, the two vowels /i, a/ are pronounced as [ɪ, ɐ].
- Before velar consonants, the three vowels /i, a, ʊ/ are pronounced as [ɪ, ɒ, o].
- Vowel sounds are rhotacized when preceding retroflex consonants.

=== Consonants ===
| | Peripheral | | Laminal | | Apical | |
| | Labial | Velar | Dental | Palatal | Alveolar | Retroflex |
|---|---|---|---|---|---|---|
| Plosive | p ⟨p⟩ | k ⟨k⟩ | t̪ ⟨tj⟩ | (c ⟨tj⟩) | t ⟨t⟩ | ʈ ⟨ṯ⟩ |
| Nasal | m ⟨m⟩ | ŋ ⟨ng⟩ | n̪ ⟨ny⟩ | (ɲ ⟨ny⟩) | n ⟨n⟩ | ɳ ⟨ṉ⟩ |
| Lateral | | | l̪ ⟨ly⟩ | (ʎ ⟨ly⟩) | l ⟨l⟩ | ɭ ⟨ḻ⟩ |
| Rhotic | | | | | ɾ~r ⟨r⟩ | |
| Approximant | w ⟨w⟩ | | | j ⟨y⟩ | | ɻ ⟨ṟ⟩ |

- Laminal stop sounds tend to vary, across the dialects of Ngaanyatjarra. In the Western dialects, they are always pronounced as dental, and in the Eastern dialects they are pronounced as palatal. Yet they are still orthographically transcribed the same as palatal sounds, as in the other dialects.
- When occurring after nasal sounds, stop consonants become slightly voiced.

=== Phonotactics ===
Words always end in vowels.

== Grammar ==
Pronominal suffixes differ between singular, dual and plural, e.g. -n "you" (singular), -pulan "you" (dual), and -yan "you" (plural).

== Vocabulary ==
=== Semantic correspondence ===
Some Ngaanyatjarra words correspond to multiple English words:

| Ngaanyatjarra | English |
|---|---|
| yurnmi | 'cooked', 'ripe' |
| wanka | 'alive', 'awake', 'uncooked' |
| pungku | 'will hit', 'will kill' |
| kuka | 'meat', 'edible animal' |
| waru | 'fire', 'firewood' |
| warta | 'tree', 'stick', 'wooden artifact' |
| nyinaku | 'will sit', 'will stay', 'will live' |
| nyaku | 'will see', 'will look' |
| kulilku | 'will hear', 'will listen', 'will think' |
| pina | 'ear', 'mind' |
| mirri | 'dead', 'unconscious' |

On the other hand, some English words correspond to multiple Ngaanyatjarra words:

| Ngaanyatjarra | English |
|---|---|
| mirrka (vegetable food) | 'food' |
| kuka (meat) | 'food' |
| tjurtu (older sister) | 'sister' |
| marlanypa (younger sister or brother) | 'sister' |
| nyarrumpa (a male's sister, also a female's brother) | 'sister' |
| pungku (will hit from nearby, using a stick or hand) | 'will hit' |
| yatulku (will hit with a missile) | 'will hit' |
| pirti (hole in the ground) | 'hole' |
| yarla (hole that goes through to the other side) | 'hole' |
| lirrirntanku (will choke another person, i.e. strangle) | 'will choke' |
| ngakalku (will choke on something in the throat) | 'will choke' |
| nyarnpiku (women will dance) | 'will dance' |
| kantulku (men will dance) | 'will dance' |
| nyaaku? (what for?) | 'why?' |
| nyaatjanu? (as a result of what?) | 'why?' |
| puulku (will blow with the mouth) | 'will blow' |
| wangkaku (wind will blow) | 'will blow' |
| wawanypa (weak through illness) | 'weak' |
| pawun-pawunpa (as of furniture likely to collapse) | 'weak' |
| witulku (will send a person) | 'will send' |
| wiyalku (will send a thing or person) | 'will send' |
| yirna (used only of men) | 'old' |
| pampa (used only of women) | 'old' |

=== Time ===
Kuwarri and walykunya, while translated here 'now', rarely mean 'right this moment' as the word in English often does. Depending on context, it can mean 'within the hour', 'sometime today', 'this week', or 'current times' as opposed to 'former times'.

Ngaanyatjarra people are more conscious of events, rather than time.

| Ngaanyatjarra | English |
|---|---|
| mantayuti | 'earth is visible' |
| tjirntukutu | 'towards sunrise' |
| yunguntjarra | 'morning', 'tomorrow' |
| karlarla | 'middle of the day', 'when the sun is high' |
| mungarrtji | 'afternoon when the sun is low and until dark', 'yesterday' |
| mungangka | 'at night', 'when it is dark' |
| karrangka | 'in the half light of evening or morning’ |
| kuwarri, walykunya | 'now', 'presently', 'just now' (see note) |
| kutjupa tjirntu | 'the day before' |
| ngaangkalpi | 'the previous time', 'not long ago' |
| kutjulpirtu | 'in the past', 'a long time ago' |
| kuwarripa | 'in a little while', 'for a little while', 'still', also used as a command meaning 'hang on a minute' |
| ngula | 'sometime later', 'bye and bye' |

==== Periods of time ====
Periods of time, e.g. a year, are referred to by natural phenomena that mark the 'peak' of that period, e.g. kurli 'year', literally 'hot season', (years are sometimes counted by Christmases in modern Ngaanyatjarra) and kirnara 'month', literally 'moon', 'lunar month'. They are measured by the period's 'peak', so e.g. 15 months would be referred to as kurli kutjarra 'two years' if it included two hot seasons, and ten days would be referred to as wiiki kutjarra 'two weeks' if it included two Sundays. Note that the custom of counting years and celebrating birthdays is not part of the traditional culture.

Days are counted by the number of sleeps (ngurra 'camp') and weeks by the number of Sundays.

The year is broken into four seasons.

| Ngaanyatjarra | English |
|---|---|
| kurli | 'hot season' |
| wiltjanyina | 'sitting in the shade time' |
| nyinnga | 'cold season' |
| pirriya-pirriya | 'windy season' |

=== Colors ===
Color terms correspond to nature, e.g.:

| Ngaanyatjarra | English |
|---|---|
| mantaly-mantalypa, parnaly-parnalypa | 'brown', literally 'earthy' |
| tjitirn-tjitirnpa, yarrarltja | 'red' |
| pirntalpa | 'white' |
| maru | 'black' |
| yukiri-yukiri | 'green', literally 'like grass' |
| yilkari-yilkari | 'blue', literally 'like sky' |
| yirnuntji-yirnuntji | 'yellow', literally 'like acacia blossom' |

=== Numbers ===
The numeral system is very simple:

| Ngaanyatjarra | English |
|---|---|
| kutju | 'one' |
| kutjarra | 'two' |
| marnkurrpa | 'three', 'a few' |
| pirni | 'many' |

Some larger numbers can be formed through combining these:

| Ngaanyatjarra | English |
|---|---|
| kutjarra-kutjarra | 'four' |
| kutjarra-marnkurrpa | 'five' |

=== Idioms ===
In English, emotions are often expressed using the heart as a metaphor, e.g. 'heartless', 'heartbroken'. In Ngaanyatjarra, body parts can also be metaphorically used to express emotion:

| Ngaanyatjarra | English |
|---|---|
| kurrurnpa yarlarriku (spirit become-open) | 'feel relief, release' |
| kurrurnpa yirralarriku (spirit become-liquid) | 'relax and laugh' |
| tjuni walykurriku (stomach become-bad) | 'be disturbed, upset' |
| tjuni kartakatiku (stomach break) | 'be bereaved' |
| liri kampaku (throat burn) | 'be angry' |
| lirri warurriku (throat become-hot) | 'be angry' |

=== Words for new concepts ===
Languages have various ways of forming words for new concepts. The most common is borrowing from other languages, which is employed in Ngaanyatjarra:

| Ngaanyatjarra | English |
|---|---|
| raapita | 'rabbit' |
| kuulpa | 'school' |
| walypala | 'whitefellow' |
| turirrpa | 'dress' |

Note that since the phonologies of Ngaanyatjarra and English differ, these words changes form. Ngaanyatjarra words do not end in consonants, so extra vowels or the suffix -pa can be added. /b/ and /f/ both become ⟨p⟩. Clusters such as ⟨tr⟩ cannot occur so an epenthetic vowel is added, and /s/, absent in Ngaanyatjarra, is replaced with ⟨rr⟩.

Loanwords often have a slightly different meaning from the English equivalent:

| Ngaanyatjarra | English |
|---|---|
| tayipi, tayipa | 'tape-recorder' (not 'tape') |
| puluka | 'bull', 'cow', 'steer', etc |
| tawunpa | 'town', 'settlement', 'city', 'house' |

Compound words are also formed to express new concepts:

| Ngaanyatjarra | English |
|---|---|
| warta-kartalpa ('wood-cutting thing') | axe |
| waya-tjarra ('wire-having') | billycan |

The meaning of native terms can also be extended to cover new concepts.

| Ngaanyatjarra | English |
|---|---|
| kulturnu | 'speared', 'sewed', 'gave an injection' |
| wirta | 'saliva', 'soap powder' |
| karilpa | 'hindquarters', 'skirt' |
| yirlintji | 'reed with fluffy head', 'matches' |

== Sample text ==
Watilu kurringka watjarru kulkultju kutipitjaku tjutipungka katuma mirrkatju pala tjurra wanti. Nyangka minymali mirrka paarnu tjunu wantirru tjarrpangu wiltjangka kankunarringu. Nyangku tjilku katjarralu pitjangu mirrka mantjirnu katingu ngalungu. Nyangka wataa mungangka pitjangku kurrinku.

In English: A man said to his wife "We are going hunting to shoot something and bring it back. Cook some food and keep it aside for me." So the woman cooked the food, set it aside, went into the shade of a tree and went to sleep. Then two children came along and took the food away and ate it. When the man came home at night there was no food for him.

== Sources ==
- "2016 Census QuickStats: Laverton - Ngaanyatjarraku - Surrounds". Australian Bureau of Statistics. 2016.
- Glass, Amee; Hackett, Dorothy (1979). Ngaanyatjarra texts. New Revised edition of Pitjantjatjara texts (1969). Canberra: Australian Institute of Aboriginal Studies. ISBN 0-391-01683-0.
- Glass, Amee; Hackett, Dorothy (2003). Ngaanyatjarra & Ngaatjatjarra to English Dictionary. Alice Springs: IAD press. ISBN 1-86465-053-2.
- Douglas, W. H. (1964). An introduction to the Western Desert language: a pedagogical description of the Western Desert language, based on the dialect spoken at Warburton Ranges, Western Australia. Sydney: University of Sydney. pp. 10–28.
