= Antakirinja people =

Aboriginal Australian people

The Antakirinja, otherwise spelt Antakarinya, and alternatively spoken of as the Ngonde, (Note: "An alternative that may be more valid is Ngonde, but this term has been said by some aborigines to embrace also the Jangkundjara, being applied to two hordes in the Everard Range area.") are an indigenous Australian people of South Australia.

Many people who previously identified as Antikirinya now instead identify as Yankunytjatjara.

== Name ==
The name Antakarinya is almost certainly of Arrandic origin. A probable etymology is antekerre ("south") and -nye (a suffix attached to directions or places indicating something from there).

Norman Tindale held the name means "westerners", from andakara ("west"). Wilkins & Petch (1997) states it is probably from Lower Arrernte, from the words antekerre ("west") and -arenye ("originating from").

== Language ==
Antakarinya language is a Western Desert language belonging to the Wati language family of the Pama–Nyungan languages.

== Country ==
Norman Tindale estimated the total range of lands to extend over roughly 24,500 square miles (63,000 km^{2}). They lived around the headwaters of four rivers, the Hamilton, Alberga, Wintinna, and Lora, and northwards over the modern border as far as Kulgera in the Northern Territory. Their southern frontiers, just before the start of the gibber desert terrain, ran down to Mount Willoughby, Arckaringa, and the Stuart Range, close to the Kokata territory at Coober Pedy. The line separating them from the Matuntara tribe roughly coincides with the northern reaches of the bluebush plains.

== Social organization ==
The Antakarinya were composed of several hordes.

- Walarangunja (eastern Everard Ranges)
- Kadjilaranda (clan north of the eastern Everard Ranges)

Christopher Giles, a Telegraph Stationmaster at Charlotte Waters, wrote about their social organization (according to Norman Tindale, Giles' data is incorrectly ascribed to the Antakarinya and actually refers to Arrernte). Giles wrote in 1875 they had four class names:

- Parroola
- Panungka
- Booltara
- Koomurra

According to Giles, the marriage relations of the four were tabulated in the following manner:

Male	Marries	Children are
Parroola	Panungka	Koomurra
Panungka	Parroola	Booltara
Booltara	Koomurra	Poonungka (sic)
Koomurra	Booltara	Parroola

== Alternative names ==
- Antakarinja, Antakerinya, Antakerrinya, Andagirinja, Andagarinja, Andekerinja (Arrernte pronunciation), Andekarinja, Antekarinja, Andigarinya
- Andigirinji, Antingari, Andigari, Andgari
- Andegilliga, Andigarina, Antigari, Andigiri, Anjirigna
- Anterrikanya, Antegarinya, Antigerinya, Andjirigna
- Untergerrie
- Aldolinga
- Ngonde
- Tangara
- Yandairunga
- Njuntundjara (Yankuntjatjarra exonym)
- Walarangunja
- Walarenunga
- Kadjilaranda
- Aluna (language name for southern bands)

== Sources ==
- "Aboriginal South Australia". Government of South Australia. Archived from the original on 24 March 2019.
- "AIATSIS map of Indigenous Australia". AIATSIS.
- Bates, Daisy (1918). "Aborigines of the West Coast of South Australia; vocabularies and ethnological notes". Transactions of the Royal Society of South Australia. 42. Adelaide: 152–167.
- Berndt, R. M.; Johnston, T. Harvey (March 1942). "Death, Burial, and Associated Ritual at Ooldea, South Australia". Oceania. 12 (3): 189–208. doi:10.1002/j.1834-4461.1942.tb00357.x. JSTOR 40327948.
- Berndt, R. M.; Berndt, Catherine (June 1942). "A Preliminary Report of Field Work in the Ooldea Region, Western South Australia". Oceania. 12 (4): 305–330. doi:10.1002/j.1834-4461.1942.tb00363.x. JSTOR 40327957.
- Condon, H. T. (July 1955a). "Aboriginal bird names -South Australia Part 1" (PDF). South Australian Ornithologist. 21 (6/7). Adelaide: 74–88.
- Elkin, A. P. (September 1931). "The Social Organization of South Australian Tribes". Oceania. 2 (1): 44–73. doi:10.1002/j.1834-4461.1931.tb00022.x. JSTOR 40327353.
- Elkin, A. P. (March 1940a). "Kinship in South Australia (Continued)". Oceania. 10 (3): 295–349. doi:10.1002/j.1834-4461.1940.tb00295.x. JSTOR 40327772.
- Elkin, A. P. (June 1940b). "Kinship in South Australia (Continued)". Oceania. 10 (4): 369–388. doi:10.1002/j.1834-4461.1940.tb00302.x. JSTOR 40327864.
- Giles, Christopher; Taplin, George (1879). Folklore, manners, customs and languages of the South Australian aborigines (PDF). Adelaide: E Spiller, Acting Government Printer.
- Giles, Christopher; Fison, Lorimer; Howitt, Alfred William (1880). Kamilaroi and Kurnai (PDF). Melbourne: G Robinson.
- Helms, Richard (1896). "Anthropology of the Elder Exploring Expedition. 1871-1872". Transactions of the Royal Society of South Australia. 16. Adelaide: 237–332.
- Howitt, Alfred William (1904). The native tribes of south-east Australia (PDF). Macmillan.
- Krichauff, F. E. H. W. (1886). "Customs, Religious Ceremonies etc., of the Aldolinga or Mbenderinga tribe in Krichauff Ranges, Central Australia" (PDF). Proceedings of the Royal Geographical Society of Australasia, S.A. Branch. 2: 32–37, 77–80.
- Tindale, Norman Barnett (1974). "Antakirinja (SA)". Aboriginal Tribes of Australia: Their Terrain, Environmental Controls, Distribution, Limits, and Proper Names. Australian National University. ISBN 978-0-708-10741-6.
