= Ngaatjatjarra people =

The Ngaatjatjarra (otherwise spelt Ngadadjara) are an Indigenous Australian people of Western Australia, with communities located in the north eastern part of the Goldfields-Esperance region.

Ngaatjatjarra people live primarily in the Aboriginal communities of Warakurna, Wanarn, Tjukurla and Patjarr. Some also live in Kintore and Kiwirrkurra to the north, Docker River and Mutitjulu in the east, as well as in Warburton and further west.

== Name ==
The ethnonym Ngaatjatjarra essentially translates to "ngaatja-having", ngaatja meaning "this, here" and -tjarra meaning "with, having". Compare the neighbouring people Ngaanyatjarra, which translates to "ngaanya-having", where instead "this, here" translates to ngaanya.

== Language ==
Ngaatjatjarra is mutually intelligible with Ngaanyatjarra, and both are treated as dialects of the one language.

== Country ==
Norman Tindale (Note: Tindale's estimates particularly for the peoples of the Western desert are not considered to be accurate. (Tonkinson 1989, p. 101)) assigned them traditional lands he estimated as covering roughly 78,000 square kilometres (30,000 mi^{2}). The centre of their traditional life was in the Warburton Ranges and in particular at a site, Warupuju Spring, where water was always available. (Note: During the severe drought of the mid-30s, members of the Adelaide expedition managed to be at Warupuju spring when ŋatari (strangers), Ngaanyatjarra tribespeople, desperate for water, pushed their way in from the west. An altercation, which was filmed, soon ensued as the local clan defended its control of the water soak, until a ritual accommodation was found and the Ngaanyatjarra were given permission to access the waters. (Tindale 1974, pp. 70, 70)) Their eastern frontiers lay around Fort Welcome, the Blackstone Ranges, Murray Range and Mount Hinckley. In the southeast, their furthest boundary was at the Ero:tjo watering hole, south of Wangalina. To the northeast, they roamed as far as Kudjuntari in the Schwerin Mural Crescent Range and around Julia (Giles) in the Yurliya Range. Their northern range extended to Hopkins Lake and Carnegie Range and beyond the Christopher Lake. Their western limits were around Tekateka and Jalara and the Alfred Marie Ranges.

Tindale's map places the neighbouring tribes of the Ngaatjatjarra as, running clockwise, the Keiadjara and the Wenamba to their north, the Pitjantjatjara on their eastern frontier, the Nakako and Mandjindja to their south and the Ngaanyatjarra on their western borders. The AIATSIS map calls then Ngatatjara and absorbs the Keiadjara and the Wenamba in to the Martu and Pintupi respectively.

A native map of their water mythology explaining how the overarching rainbow, Tjurtiraŋo, produces the various water resources, was made for Tindale in the 1939s and is reproduced in his 1974 book.

== History of contact ==
The first white contact with the Ngaatjatjarra came relatively late. Tindale describes in detail one nuclear family of the tribe encountered in August 1935 during the Expedition of the Board for Anthropological Research of the University of Adelaide.

== Culture ==
=== Social organization ===
The practised patrilocal residence, and their marriage arrangements were based on for class system. Father's father, father, son, son's son and their brothers inherited a totem (tjukur/tuma) which bore associations with specific topographical features of the landscape that evoked the movements of the creative being in their dreaming. They practised both circumcision and subincision, in two distinct phrases, on youths undergoing initiation into full manhood, employing biface pressure-flaked stone knives ('tjimbila), which they obtained through trade with neighbouring tribes to their north, who in turn ultimately received them from their production centre in northwestern Australia.

==== Kinship ====
Ngaatjatjarra kinship is classificatory, using the Iroquois system ( One's father and one's father's brother are both called mamu, and, similarly, ngunytju refers to a mother or mother's sister. Kurntili "aunt" refers to a father's sister and kamuru "uncle" to a mother's brother. This system extends indefinitely, e.g. one's mother's mother's sister's daughter is a ngunytju "mother", and one's mother's mother's brother's daughter is a kurntili "aunt".

Older brothers are called kurta and older sisters tjurtu. Parallel cousins are considered to be like siblings; only cross cousins are called watjirra "cousins". Younger siblings are called marlany or marlanypa. Nyarrumpa refers to all siblings and parallel cousins of the opposite sex of the speaker.

Terms for grandparents and grandchildren are self-reciprocal if the speakers are of the same sex: kaparli refers to a woman's grandmother or granddaughter, and tjamu for a man's grandfather or grandson.

==== Social categories ====
===== Moieties =====
Ngaatjatjarra	tjintultukultul	ngumpaluru
English	sun side	shade side

Each Ngaatjatjarra person is divided into a moiety depending on their generation. A person always belongs to the same moiety as their siblings and cousins, grandparents and grandchildren, whereas their parents and children are in the opposite moiety. Traditionally, one shows respect to a person of the opposite moiety, as well as a certain physical distance. Each moiety is strictly distinguished in ceremonies.

===== Skin names =====
Ngaatjatjarra people adopted skin names during the first half of the nineteenth century, called in Ngaatjatjarra yini "name", miri "skin, skin colour" and yara "symbol, metaphor". Each individual belongs to a skin name, which divide the moieties, so that tjintultukultul people are Tjarurru or Panaka (also called Yiparrka), whereas ngumpaluru people are Karimarra (also called Milangka), or Purungu.

Skin names control one's marriage options, so that e.g. a Karimarra woman must marry a Purungu man. They will have Tjarurru children, who must marry a Panaka spouse. This system makes it possible for one to identify how they are related to each other e.g. if a Tjarurru person meets a Karimarra man, they know the latter is a mother's brother or father-in-law.

=== Food ===
The Ngaatjatjarra harvested grass seeds (wakati) and worked them with rolling stones to obtain a paste for nutriment. They also gathered nicotiniana excelsior, a tobacco leaf which they dried over fire and which they chew after mixing them with ashes from burnt acacia and phyllodes.

== Some words ==
- tartu (seeds pods of the river red gum used to decorate a girl's hair)
- tjitjimurdilja (uncircumcised youth)
- wana (woman's digging stick)

== Alternative names ==
- Jabungadja ("mountain Ngadja", those of the Rawlinson Ranges)
- Ku.rara (Pitjantjatjara exonym for Rawlinson Ranges' tribes)
- Nga:da
- Nga:dapitjardi (western tribal name for hordes in the vicinity of the Blackstone Ranges)
- Ngadatara (Pitjantjatjara exonym)
- Ngadawongga
- Nganadjara (Warburton Range horde name for those northeast of them near the Rawlinson Ranges)
- Ngatatjara, Ngadjatara, Ngadadara, Nadadjara, Ngadatjara
- Rumudjara
- Teitudjara (Nana exonym)
- Wan:udjara (eastern Ngadadjara name for their northern branches at Giles)
- Warara (northeastern hordes' name)
- Wirtjandja
- Witjandja (Warburton Range horde)

Source: Tindale 1974, p. 250

== Sources ==
- "AIATSIS map of Indigenous Australia". AIATSIS. 14 May 2024.
- Brinkley, Cath (February 2009). "Kiwirrkurra: The Flood in the Desert". Australian Journal of Emergency Management. 24 (1): 67–70. ISSN 1324-1540.
- Brooks, David; Jorgensen, Darren (2015). Wanarn painters of place and time: old age travels in the Tjukurrpa. UWA Publishing. ISBN 978-1-74258-553-6.
- Dousset, Laurent (1996). Genealogies in Tjukurla, Western Desert: Final report – via Trove.
- Dousset, Laurent (2002). "Politics and demography in a contact situation: the establishment of the Giles Meteorological Station in the Rawlinson Ranges, West Australia". Aboriginal History. 26: 1–22. JSTOR 24046045.
- Grey-Gardner, Robyn (2008). Remote community water management. Desert Knowledge Cooperative Research Centre. ISBN 978-1-74158-071-6.
- Knights, Mary (2006). Irrunytju Arts. Irrunytju Arts. ISBN 978-0-646-45991-2.
- Kral, Inge (2012). Talk, Text and Technology: Literacy and Social Practice in a Remote Indigenous Community. Multilingual Matters. ISBN 978-1-847-69759-2.
- Montredon, Jacques; Ellis, Lizzie Marrkiliyi (2014). "Narratives from Tjukurla". Translated by David Ball; Noé Le Blanc; Nancy Peuteuil. St Lucia, Queensland: University of Queensland, Université de Franche-Comté – via Trove.
- Munro, Peter (2004). The frontier spirits of the outback – via Trove.
- Munroe, Elaine (1991). Tjukurrpa tjitji kutjarranya: a traditional story from Mantamaru. Ngaanyatjarra Bible Project. ISBN 978-0-949255-24-2.
- Nelson, Lula (1993). "Tjirntu purlkanya (big sun): handpainted silk from the women of Tjirrkali Aboriginal community". Lawrence Wilson Art Gallery, University of Western Australia – via Trove.
- "Papulankutja artists: painting together our stories from the heart". Papulankutja Artists. 2015 – via Trove.
- Raffan, Jane (2009). "Warakurna Artists" – via Trove.
- "Tindale Tribal Boundaries" (PDF). Department of Aboriginal Affairs, Western Australia. September 2016. Archived from the original (PDF) on 8 March 2016.
- Tindale, Norman Barnett (1974). "Ngadadjara (WA)". Aboriginal Tribes of Australia: Their Terrain, Environmental Controls, Distribution, Limits, and Proper Names. Australian National University Press. ISBN 978-0-708-10741-6. Archived from the original on 20 March 2020.
- Tonkinson, Robert (1989). "Local Organisation and Land Tenure in the Karlamilyi (Rudall River) Region" (PDF). In Western Desert Working Group (ed.). The significance of the Karlamilyi Region to the Martujarra people of the Western Desert. Perth: Department of Conservation and Land Management. pp. 99–259.
