= Martu Wangka dialect =

Variety of the Western Desert language

Martu Wangka
- Region: Northwest Western Australia
- Ethnicity: Kartudjara, Manjiljarra, Yulparija, Maduwongga
- Native speakers: 814 (2021 census)
- Language family: Pama–Nyungan: Wati; Western Desert; Martu Wangka

Language codes
- ISO 639-3: mpj
- Glottolog: mart1256
- AIATSIS: A86
- ELP: Martu Wangka
- Martuwangka is classified as Vulnerable by the UNESCO Atlas of the World's Languages in Danger.

Martu Wangka is a variety of the Western Desert language that emerged during the 20th century in Western Australia as several Indigenous communities shifted from their respective territories to form a single community.

It refers to both a dialect found at and around Jigalong, Western Australia and many different dialect groups in the Gibson, Little Sandy and Great Sandy deserts.

A dictionary of over 400 pages was published in 1992. This dictionary has been described as "a volume of interim work-sheets" that was published to encourage the conservation of the language. An edited version was published in 2005. An introduction to the structure and use of Martu Wangka was published in 2017.

== History ==
Martu Wangka developed after two tribes, the Kartudjara and the Manjiljarra came in from the Western desert to settle into Jigalong during the 1960s. Though tribally distinct, they spoke two mutually intelligible dialects of the Western Desert language family. Through daily cohabitation, they developed a koiné language. In this process, elements of the two languages are selected to fuse into a single shared idiom, thus forming a lingua franca distinct from the originative dialects of the various groups who settled down to live together.

== Phonology ==
=== Vowels ===
	Front	Back
High	i iː	ʊ ʊː
Low	a aː	

- /i/ can be heard as sounds [i] or [ɪ] in free variation.
- /ʊ/ can be heard as sounds [ʊ] or [u] in free variation.
- /a/ is typically pronounced as [a] or [ɐ]. When following the glide /w/, it may be realized as [ɒ].

=== Consonants ===
	Peripheral		Laminal	Apical	
	Bilabial	Velar	Palatal	Alveolar	Retroflex
Plosive	p	k	ɟ	t	ʈ
Nasal	m	ŋ	ɲ	n	ɳ
Lateral			ʎ	l	ɭ
Tap				ɾ	
Approximant	w		j		ɻ

- Sounds /p, t, k/ can have voiced allophones [b, d, ɡ] when occurring in word-medial positions.
- /ʈ/ can also be heard as a voiced sound [ɖ] or a tap sound [ɽ] in various positions.
- /ɾ/ can also be heard as a trill [r].
