= Western Desert cultural bloc =

Aboriginal cultural region in central Australia

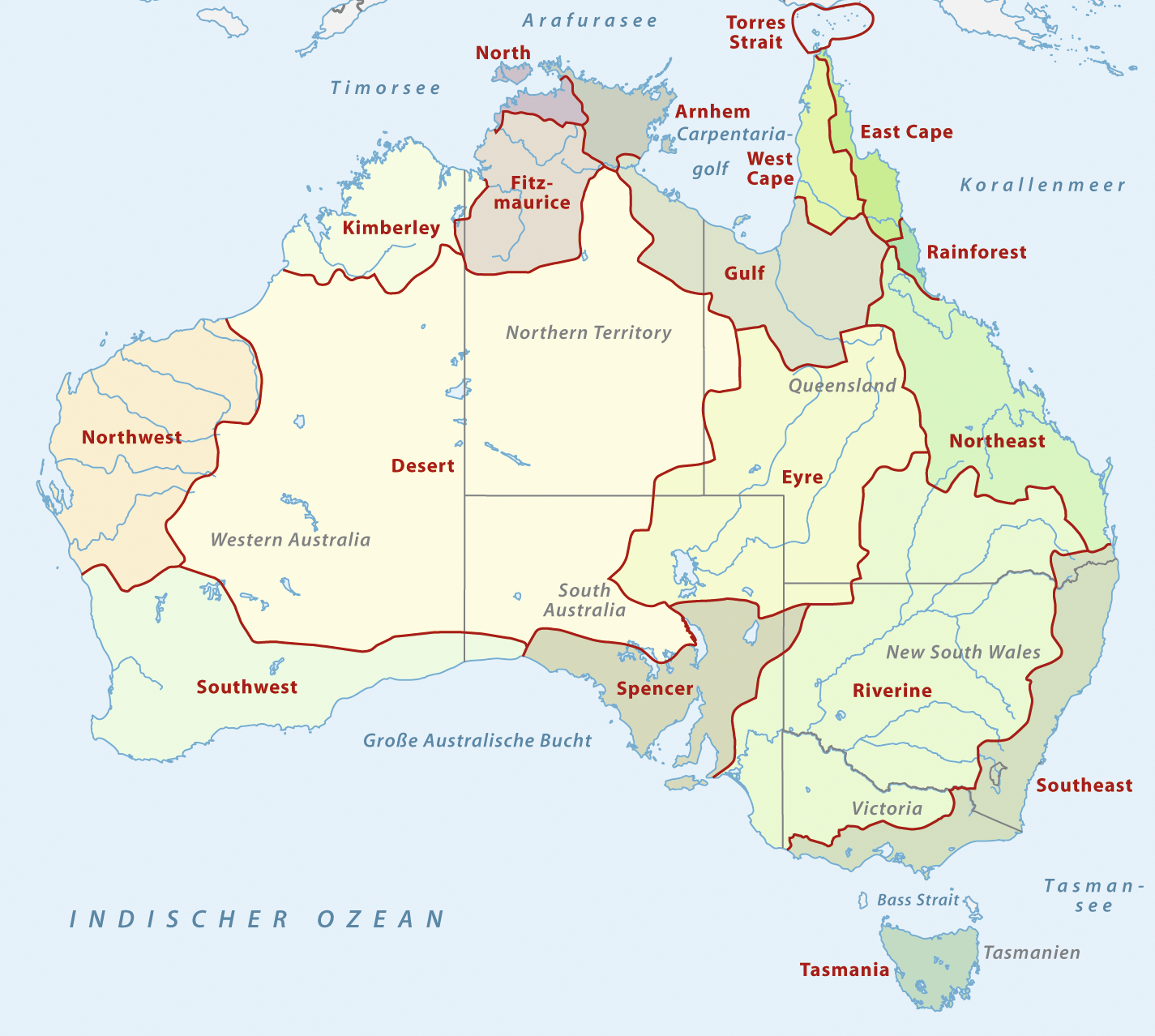
Indigenous Australian cultural regions

The Western Desert cultural bloc (also capitalised, abbreviated to WDCB, or just Western Desert) is a cultural region in central Australia covering about 600,000 square kilometres (230,000 mi^{2}), used to describe a group of culturally similar Aboriginal Australian peoples who speak mutually intelligible varieties of the Western Desert language.

== Languages ==
The term Western Desert cultural bloc is often used by anthropologists and linguists when discussing the 40 or so Aboriginal groups that live there, who speak dialects of one language, often called the Western Desert language. The term cultural bloc is used by anthropologists to describe culturally and linguistically similar groups (or nations) of Aboriginal peoples of Australia.

== Country ==
According to anthropologist Robert Tonkinson:

Extending over a million square miles, the Western Desert... covers a vast area of the interior of the continent. It extends across western South Australia into central and central northern Western Australia (south of the Kimberleys) and south-western Northern Territory, and it includes most of the hill country in northern South Australia..The area is marked by an overall similarity in both climatic conditions... and physiographical characteristics. More important, however, is its delineation as a distinct culture area.. its Aboriginal inhabitants share a common language (with dialectal variations), social organization, relationship to the natural environment, religion and mythology and aesthetic expression. The term Western Desert, then refers to both a cultural bloc and a geographical entity.

The WDCB covers around 670,000 km^{2} (260,000 sq mi) and extends across much of Western Australia, parts of South Australia, and parts of the Northern Territory. includes the Gibson Desert, the Great Victoria Desert, the Great Sandy and Little Sandy Deserts in the Northern Territory, South Australia and Western Australia. It stretches from the Nullarbor in the south to the Kimberley in the north, and from the Percival Lakes in the west through to the Pintupi lands in the Northern Territory.

== History ==
Human occupation in the Western Desert dates back at least 25,000 years.

Western Desert people were largely nomadic. Family groups often travelled 20 km (12 mi) or more a day, while hunting and foraging, to reach the next waterhole, where they would build a yuu (windbreak) or wiltja (shelter). A family group travelled alone, sometimes with elderly people or fostered children, but regularly met with nearby family groups, forming a regional group tied to a specific area and sacred sites. Multiple regional groups would meet with each other to perform ceremonies.

=== Contact era ===
Due to the harshness of the area, many regions in the Western Desert did not experience sustained contact with European authorities until about the 1920s. Although Ernest Giles became the first European to cross the Western Desert in 1876, Mt Margaret Mission was only established in 1921. Then, Warburton Mission was established in 1934, Balgo Mission in 1939 and Jigalong in 1946. Cundeelee was founded as a ration depot in 1939 and became a mission in the 1950s. In contrast, Hermannsburg Mission near Alice Springs was established in 1877.

=== Modern history ===
With European colonisation of Australia, Western Desert people are no longer hunter-gatherers, instead acquiring food and other goods commercially.

A 2007 court case held by the Federal Court of Australia to determine "whether there was authorisation to apply for native title determination by all holders of native title claimed" had to determine whether a Western Desert Cultural Bloc society existed before colonisation. The judgment held that such a society existed in 1829, and continues to exist today.

A 2018 native title determination determined that the Lappi Lappi and Ngulupi claimants "belong to the Western Desert Cultural Bloc (WDCB) system of laws and customs", and had rights to an area in the western part of the Tanami Desert.

== History of contact ==
Ronald Berndt estimated that, before the European colonisation of Australia, the Western Desert peoples may have numbered as many as 10,000, but that by the late 1950s, their numbers were down to between 1,371 and 2,200. Apart from the Canning Stock Route and the rabbit-proof fence, white contact with this part of Australia was very rare until the 1960s. Terry Long, a Native Patrol Officer employed by the Weapons Research Establishment, observed:

No one had been out there. The desert, as far as the Department [WA Dept of Supply] was concerned... was an unknown, as it was to the whole of Western Australia. The Warburton Ranges [were] as far as anybody got. People in those days knew absolutely nothing about Aborigines [sic].

== Dialect groups ==
- Antekarinja
- Kukatja
- Luritja
- Mandjildjara
- Martu
- Ngaatjatjarra
- Ngaanyatjarra
- Pini (Nana)
- Pitjantjatjara
- Pintupi
- Spinifex people
- Wongatha
- Yankunytjatjara

== See also ==
- Anangu
- People of the Australian Western Desert, a documentary film series about the Martu people

== Sources ==
- Berndt, Ronald M. (December 1959). "The Concept of 'The Tribe' in the Western Desert of Australia". Oceania. 30 (2): 81–107. doi:10.1002/j.1834-4461.1959.tb00213.x. JSTOR 40329194.
- Davenport, Sue; Johnson, Peter; Yuwali (2005). Cleared Out: First Contact in the Western Desert. Aboriginal Studies Press. ISBN 978-0-855-75457-0.
- Memmott, Paul (2007). Gunyah, Goondie + Wurley: The Aboriginal Architecture of Australia. University of Queensland Press. ISBN 978-0-702-23245-9.
- Dusset, Laurent (2005). Assimilating Identities: Social Networks and the Diffusion of Sections. Sydney: Oceania Publications, Monograph 57.
- Morgan, Margaret (1999). Mt Margaret: A Drop in a Bucket. Lawson, NSW: Mission Publications of Australia ISBN 978-0-646-34220-7 (out of print).
- Harrington-Smith on behalf of the Wongatha People v State of Western Australia (No 9) Page 4 of 112 http://www.austlii.edu.au/au/cases/cth/federal_ct/2007/31.html 5/17/2007 accessed 5 September 2009
