= Nakako =

Indigenous group in Australia

The Nakako are an Aboriginal Australian people of Western and Southern Australia.

== Country ==
Norman Tindale estimated the Nakako territorial domains to stretch 19,000 square miles (49,000 km^{2}), south and southwest of the Papulankutja (Blackstone Ranges). Tindale also states that the Nanako were present at Bell Rock Range.

== History ==
The Nakako were one of the last groups of people to come within the purview of white explorers.

Suspicions that a group may have trespassed on the Pitjantjatjara's western boundaries in the Kalaiapiti region, deduced partly from unaccountable smoke on the horizon in 1957, led to a government patrol journey (the area had not been traversed since the 1892 Elder Expedition) Apparently there were signs showing visits into the area several weeks' old. Later in 1965, the trespassing group were identified as the Nakako, "remnants of a small tribe".

1963 data of a Bellrock Range horde gives its age structure and population:

	Males	Females
61-70	1	
51-60	1	
41-50	1	3
31-40	2	1
21-30	3	1
11-20	3	4
0-10	4	4
Total	28	

Their first encounter with white explorers occurred sometime around 1953 when patrol officer Walter MacDougall came across them at Woomera. After this initial encounter, they vanished, until they were rediscovered by white settlers in 1961.

== Society ==
There were 2 generational terms, nganandaruka "our bone" or "our people" and tjanamiltjan "the others", shared with the Pitjantjatjara. These were not fixed and depended on the speaker's generational status, unlike the neighbouring Ngaatjatjarra.

Circumcision was practiced. Biface, pressure-flaked stone knives were known to be used. Through trade routes, knives were known to come from the north via the Kokatja, Walmadjari and Mangala. By the time they reached the Nakako they were worn and even blunt-edged.

== Alternative names ==
- Nakaku, Nangako
- Nangakopitja (Pitjantjatjara exonym)
- Wanudjara

== Sources ==
- "AIATSIS map of Indigenous Australia". AIATSIS. 14 May 2024.
- "Tindale Tribal Boundaries" (PDF). Department of Aboriginal Affairs, Western Australia. September 2016. Archived from the original (PDF) on 8 March 2016.
- Tindale, Norman Barnett (1974). "Nakako (WA)". Aboriginal Tribes of Australia: Their Terrain, Environmental Controls, Distribution, Limits, and Proper Names. Australian National University. ISBN 978-0-708-10741-6. Archived from the original on 20 March 2020.
- Tonkinson, Robert (1989). "Local Organisation and Land Tenure in the Karlamilyi (Rudall River) Region". In Western Desert Working Group (ed.). The significance of the Karlamilyi Region to the Martujarra people of the Western Desert (PDF). Department of Conservation and Land Management. pp. 99–259.
