= Western Desert language =

Dialect cluster of Pama–Nyungan languages

Western Desert
- Wati
- Native to: Australia
- Region: Desert areas of Western Australia, South Australia and the Northern Territory
- Ethnicity: Western Desert cultural bloc
- Native speakers: 7,400 (2006 census)
- Language family: Pama–Nyungan: Desert Nyungic; Wati; Western Desert
- Standard forms: Martu Wangka
- Dialects: Antakarinya dialect; Kartujarra dialect; Kokatha dialect; Kukatja (A68); Kuwarra dialect; Luritja dialect; Manyjilyjarra dialect; Mantjintjarra dialect; Martu Wangka dialect; Nakako dialect; Ngaanyatjarra dialect; Ngaatjatjarra dialect; Ngalia dialect; Pindiini dialect/Wangkatha dialect/Wangkatja dialect; Pintupi dialect; Pitjantjatjara dialect; Putijarra dialect; Tjupan dialect; Wangkajunga dialect; Yankunytjatjara dialect; Yulparija dialect
- Signed forms: Western Desert Sign Language; Manjiljarra Sign Language; Ngada Sign Language

Language codes
- ISO 639-3: Variously: ktd – Kokata (Kukarta) kux – Kukatja mpj – Martu Wangka ntj – Ngaanyatjarra pti – Pintiini (Wangkatja) piu – Pintupi-Luritja pjt – Pitjantjatjara tjp – Tjupany kdd – Yankunytjatjara
- Glottolog: wati1241 Wati
- AIATSIS: A80
- ELP: Kukatja
- Pintiini
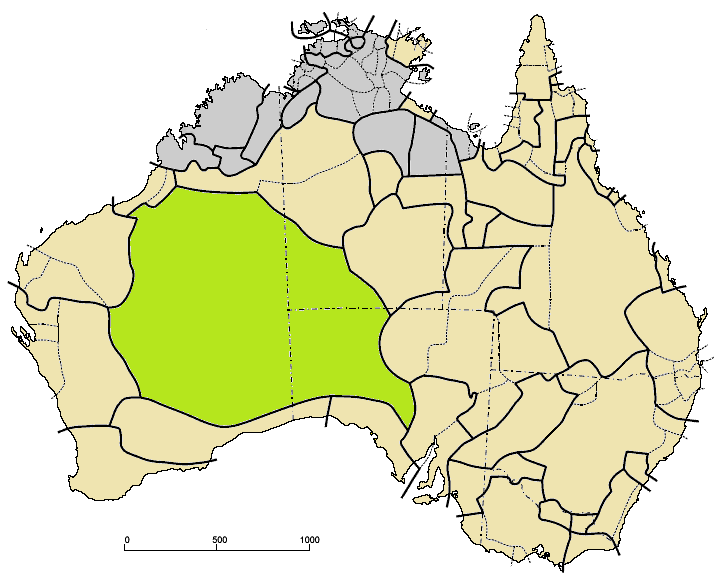
- Wati languages (green) among Pama–Nyungan (tan)

The Western Desert language, or Wati, is a dialect cluster of Australian Aboriginal languages in the Pama–Nyungan family, spoken by people comprising the Western Desert cultural bloc.

The name Wati tends to be used when considering the various varieties to be distinct languages, Western Desert when considering them dialects of a single language, or Wati as Warnman plus the Western Desert cluster.

== Location and list of communities ==
The speakers of the various dialects of the Western Desert language traditionally lived across much of the desert areas of Western Australia, South Australia and the Northern Territory. Most Western Desert people live in communities on or close to their traditional lands, although some now live in one of the towns fringing the desert area such as Kalgoorlie, Laverton, Alice Springs, Port Augusta, Meekatharra, Halls Creek and Fitzroy Crossing.

The following is a partial list of Western Desert communities:

- Kintore, Northern Territory
- Docker River, Northern Territory
- Ernabella, South Australia
- Amata, South Australia
- Fregon, South Australia
- Pipalyatjara, South Australia
- Kalka, South Australia
- Warburton, Western Australia
- Kiwirrkurra, Western Australia
- Balgo, Western Australia
- Aputula, Northern Territory (also known as Finke)
- Imanpa, Northern Territory (also known as Mount Ebenezer)
- Mutitjulu, Northern Territory
- Jigalong, Western Australia

== Dialect continuum ==
The Western Desert language consists of a network of closely related dialects; the names of some of these have become quite well known (such as Pitjantjatjara) and they are often referred to as "languages".

As the whole group of dialects that constitutes the language does not have its own name, it is usually referred to as the Western Desert language. WDL speakers referring to the overall language use various terms including wangka ("language") or wangka yuti ("clear speech"). For native speakers, the language is mutually intelligible across its entire range.

=== Dialects ===
Following are some of the named varieties of the Western Desert language.

Language/dialect	People	Notes	AIATSIS reference
Antakarinya dialect	Antakarinya people		C5: Antikirinya
Kartujarra dialect	Kartujarra people		A51: Kartujarra
Kokatha dialect	Kokatha people		C3: Kokatha
Two dialects of the Western Desert language have been named 'Kukatja'; Kukatja (A68) and Kukatja (C7)	Kukatja (A68) and Kukatja (C7)	A68 is in the north of Western Australia near Lake Gregory, and C7 is west of Haasts Bluff in central Australia. A68 is one of the dialects that make up Martu Wangka at Jigalong. C7 call themselves 'Luritja' now.	A68: Kukatja & C7: Kukatja
Kuwarra dialect	Kuwarra people	There is little information regarding the language but the people are well attested.	A16: Kuwarra
Luritja dialect	Luritja people	The Kukatja (C7) call themselves 'Luritja' now. Pintupi and Luritja are two similar but overlapping dialects.	C7.1: Luritja
Manyjilyjarra dialect	Manyjilyjarra people	One of the dialects that make up Martu Wangka at Jigalong.	A51.1: Manyjilyjarra
Mantjintjarra dialect	Mantjintjarra people		A33: Mantjintjarra
Martu Wangka dialect	Martu people	Martu Wangka refers to either a dialect found at and around Jigalong, Western Australia or many different dialect groups in the Gibson, Little Sandy and Great Sandy deserts.	A86: Martu Wangka
Nakako dialect	Nakako people	Little research has been conducted on the people and their language.	A32: Nakako
Ngaanyatjarra dialect	Ngaanyatjarra people		A38:Ngaanyatjarra
Ngaatjatjarra dialect	Ngaatjatjarra people		A43: Ngaatjatjarra
Ngalia dialect	Ngalia people		C2: Ngalia
Pindiini/Wangkatha/Wangkatja dialect	Pindiini/Wangkatha/Wangkatja people	These three dialects & people have been hardly distinguished.	A102: Pindiini, A12: Wangkatha & A103: Wangkatja
Pintupi dialect	Pintupi people	Pintupi and Luritja are two similar but overlapping dialects.	C10: Pintupi
Pitjantjatjara dialect	Pitjantjatjara people		C6: Pitjantjatjara
Putijarra dialect	Putijarra people	One of the dialects which make up Martu Wangka at Jigalong.	A54: Putijarra
Tjupan dialect	Tjupan people		A31: Tjupan
Wangkajunga dialect	Wangkajunga people		A87: Wangkajunga
Yankunytjatjara dialect	Yankunytjatjara people		C4: Yankunytjatjara
Yulparija dialect	Yulparija people		A67: Yulparija

== Language ==
=== Status ===
The Western Desert language has thousands of speakers, making it one of the strongest indigenous Australian languages. The language is still being transmitted to children and has substantial amounts of literature, particularly in the Pitjantjatjara and Yankunytjatjara dialects in South Australia where there was formerly a long-running bilingual program.

=== Phonology ===
In the following tables of the WDL sound system, symbols in ⟨angle brackets⟩ give a typical practical orthography used by many WDL communities. Further details of orthographies in use in different areas are given below. Phonetic values in IPA are shown in [square brackets].

==== Vowels ====
	Front	Back
Close	i ⟨i⟩ iː ⟨ii⟩	u ⟨u⟩ uː ⟨uu⟩
Open	a ⟨a⟩ aː ⟨aa⟩	

The Western Desert language has the common (for Australia) three-vowel system with a length distinction creating a total of six possible vowels.

==== Consonants ====
	Peripheral		Laminal	Apical	
	Bilabial	Velar	Palatal	Alveolar	Retroflex
Plosive	p ⟨p⟩	k ⟨k⟩	c ⟨tj⟩	t ⟨t⟩	ʈ ⟨rt⟩
Nasal	m ⟨m⟩	ŋ ⟨ng⟩	ɲ ⟨ny⟩	n ⟨n⟩	ɳ ⟨rn⟩
Trill				r ⟨rr⟩	
Lateral			ʎ ⟨ly⟩	l ⟨l⟩	ɭ ⟨rl⟩
Approximant	w ⟨w⟩		j ⟨y⟩	ɻ ⟨r⟩	

As shown in the chart, the WDL distinguishes five positions of articulation, and has oral and nasal occlusives at each position. The stops have no phonemic voice distinction but display voiced and unvoiced allophones; stops are usually unvoiced at the beginning of a word, and voiced elsewhere. In both positions, they are usually unaspirated. There are no fricative consonants.

=== Orthography ===
While the dialects of the WDL have very similar phonologies there are several different orthographies in use, resulting from the preferences of the different early researchers as well as the fact that the WDL region extends into three states (Western Australia, South Australia and the Northern Territory), with each having its own history of language research and educational policy.

=== Sign language ===
Most of the peoples of central Australia have (or at one point had) signed forms of their languages. Among the Western Desert peoples, sign language has been reported specifically for Kardutjara and Yurira Watjalku, Ngaatjatjarra (Ngada), and Manjiljarra. Signed Kardutjara and Yurira Watjalku are known to have been well-developed, though it is not clear from records that signed Ngada and Manjiljarra were.
