= Mandjildjara =

Indigenous Australian people of Western Australia

The Mandjildjara, also written Manyjilyjarra, are an Aboriginal Australian people of Western Australia.

== Country ==
In Norman Tindale's estimation (Note: Tindale's estimates particularly for the peoples of the Western desert are not considered to be accurate.) the Mandjildjara's lands extended over some 8,700 square miles (23,000 km^{2}), running along what was later known as the Canning Stock Route, from Well 30 (Tjundu'tjundu) to Well 38 (Watjaparni). It extended southwards some 50 miles as far the Tjanbari hill, and watering places they variously called Kolajuru, Karukada, Keweilba, and Kunkunba. They roamed eastwards as far as an unidentified waterhole known as Ngila.

== History of contact ==
According to Tindale, in 1964, the patrol officer, Walter MacDougall came across a group of nine Aboriginal women at a place called Imiri in the area known as Percival Lakes, who identified themselves as Mandjildjara. (Note: For this year Jeremy Long's analysis mentions only that MacDougall later came across 11 people near Jupiter in September, and that, around this time: "A group found living far to the north-west near the Percival Lakes, in the actual 'impact area' for firings of Blue Streak rocket was, I understand, offered transport to Jigalong by the Western Australian authorities. This group consisted of 20 women and children and the offer was not made because they were at risk from rockets. Apparently their male relatives had left the group some years earlier and had never returned.") At the time the whole area had suffered from severe drought conditions for over a decade, leading large numbers of desert peoples, often identified generically as Pintubi, to trek or straggle eastwards to places like Balgo and Papunya.

== Gisèle Pelicot scarf ==
In 2024, Manyjilyjarra artist Mulyatingki Marney, who lives in the remote Punmu Community in the Pilbara region of Western Australia designed a scarf which was gifted to Gisèle Pelicot by the Older Women's Network, an Australian advocacy group. Pelicot wore the scarf frequently during the trial of her rapists and said through her lawyer that she was interested in the First Nations link. The design is called Wilarra, meaning moon in the Manyjilyjarra language, and was so named after a place of the same name which is a healing place.

== Alternative names ==
- Mandjiltjara, Mantjiltjara, Mandjildara, Mantjildjara, Manjiljara
- Manyjilyjarra

== Sources ==
- "AIATSIS map of Indigenous Australia". AIATSIS. 14 May 2024.
- "Tindale Tribal Boundaries" (PDF). Department of Aboriginal Affairs, Western Australia. September 2016. Archived from the original (PDF) on 8 March 2016.
- Linder, Esther (7 November 2024). "Australian supporters gift Gisele Pelicot Aboriginal-printed scarf in solidarity at rape trial of alleged abusers". ABC News.
- Long, Jeremy (1989). "Leaving the desert: Actors and Sufferers in the Aboriginal Exodus from the Western Desert Aboriginal" (PDF). Aboriginal History. 13: 9–43.
- Murphy, Rosemary (20 December 2024). "Artwork creates a link between Gisèle Pelicot and Western Australia's remote Pilbara". ABC News.
- Tindale, Norman Barnett (1974). "Mandjildjara (WA)". Aboriginal Tribes of Australia: Their Terrain, Environmental Controls, Distribution, Limits, and Proper Names. Australian National University. ISBN 978-0-708-10741-6. Archived from the original on 20 March 2020.
- Tonkinson, Robert (1989). "Local Organisation and Land Tenure in the Karlamilyi (Rudall River) Region" (PDF). In Western Desert Working Group (ed.). The significance of the Karlamilyi Region to the Martujarra people of the Western Desert. Perth: Department of Conservation and Land Management. pp. 99–259.
