= Yankunytjatjara =

Aboriginal people of South Australia

The Yankunytjatjara people, also written Yankuntjatjarra, Jangkundjara, and other variants, are an Aboriginal Australian people of the state of South Australia.

== Language ==
Yankunytjatjara is a Western Desert language belonging to the Wati language family of the Pama-Nyungan languages.

== Country ==
According to the estimation of Norman Tindale, the Yankunytjatjara's tribal lands covered approximately 22,000 square miles (57,000 km^{2}). These lands took in the areas of the Musgrave Ranges, with their eastern frontier around the Everard Ranges.

== Social organisation ==
Yankunytjatjara kinship terminology shares many common terms with the words for kinship in the Pintupi and Pitjantjatjara dialects.

== Alternative names ==
- Alinjera ('north')
- Ankundjara
- Everard Range Tribe
- Jangkundjadjara
- Jangundjara, Jankundjadjara, Jankunzazara, Jankuntjatjara, Jankuntjatara, Jankundjindjara
- Kaltjilandjara (a Pitjantjatjara exonym, but referring to the most southwestern of the Yankuntjatjarra hordes)
- Nankundjara (typo?)
- Wirtjapakandja
- Yankunjara, Yangundjadjara, Janggundjara, Jangwundjara (typo)

== Notable people ==
- Eileen Kampakuta Brown, anti-nuclear activist and Goldman Environmental Prize winner
- Ali Cobby Eckermann, poet, author, and artist
- Nellie Lester, nurse
- Yami Lester, anti-nuclear and Indigenous rights advocate
- Lowitja O'Donoghue, Indigenous rights activist
- Tali Tali Pompey, artist
- Mona Ngitji Ngitji Tur, cultural educator, oral linguist and interpreter
- Whiskey Tjukangku, elder, and artist

== Sources ==
- "Aboriginal South Australia". Government of South Australia. Archived from the original on 1 May 2013.
- "AIATSIS map of Indigenous Australia". AIATSIS. 28 July 2023.
- Berndt, Ronald M. (December 1959). "The Concept of 'The Tribe' in the Western Desert of Australia". Oceania. 30 (2): 81–107. doi:10.1002/j.1834-4461.1959.tb00213.x. JSTOR 40329194.
- Black, J. M (1915). "Language of the Everard Range tribes". Transactions of the Royal Society of South Australia. 39. Adelaide: 732–735 – via BHL.
- Black, J. M (1920). "Vocabularies of four South Australian languages, Adelaide, Narrunga, Kukata, and Narrinyeri, with special reference to their speech sounds". Transactions of the Royal Society of South Australia. 44. Adelaide: 76–93 – via BHL.
- Fry, M. K. (June 1934). "Kinship in Western Central Australia". Oceania. 4 (4): 472–478. doi:10.1002/j.1834-4461.1934.tb00123.x. JSTOR 27976165.
- Helms, R. (1896). "Anthropology of the Elder Exploring Expedition. 1871-1872". Transactions of the Royal Society of South Australia. 16. Adelaide: 237–332 – via BHL.
- Tindale, Norman Barnett (1974). "Jangkundjara (SA)". Aboriginal Tribes of Australia: Their Terrain, Environmental Controls, Distribution, Limits, and Proper Names. Australian National University Press. ISBN 978-0-708-10741-6. Archived from the original on 14 March 2018.
- Tindale, Norman Barnett; Hackett, C. J. (September 1933). "Anthropological Expedition to the North-West of South Australia, 1933". Oceania. 4 (1): 99–105. doi:10.1002/j.1834-4461.1933.tb00090.x. JSTOR 40327448.
- Wells, L. A. (1893). Journal of the Elder Scientific Expedition, 1891-1892. Adelaide.
- White, S. A. (1916). In the far north-west; an expedition to the Musgrave and Everard Ranges. Adelaide: W.K. Thomas.
