= Antakarinya language =

Australian Aboriginal language of South Australia

Antakarinya
- Region: northeast area of South Australia
- Ethnicity: Antakirinja, Matuntara
- Native speakers: 7 (2021 census)
- Language family: Pama–Nyungan: Wati; Western Desert? Warnman?; Antakarinya

Language codes
- ISO 639-3: ant
- Glottolog: anta1253
- AIATSIS: C5
- ELP: Antakirinya
- Antakarinya is classified as Critically Endangered by the UNESCO Atlas of the World's Languages in Danger.

Antakarinya (also Andagarinya, Antikirinya, Antikirrinya) is an Australian Aboriginal language. It is one of the Wati languages of the large Pama–Nyungan family.

The Antakarinya people were greatly affected by the atomic testing at Maralinga in the 1950s and the language was similarly affected in an attempt to explain the tests.

== Name ==
The name Antakarinya is almost certainly of Arrandic origin. A probable etymology is antekerre ("south") and -nye (a suffix attached to directions or places indicating something from there).

Norman Tindale held the name means "westerners", from andakara ("west"). Wilkins & Petch (1997) states it is probably from Lower Arrernte, from the words antekerre ("west") and -arenye ("originating from").
