= Luritja =

Australian Aboriginal ethnic group of the Northern Territory

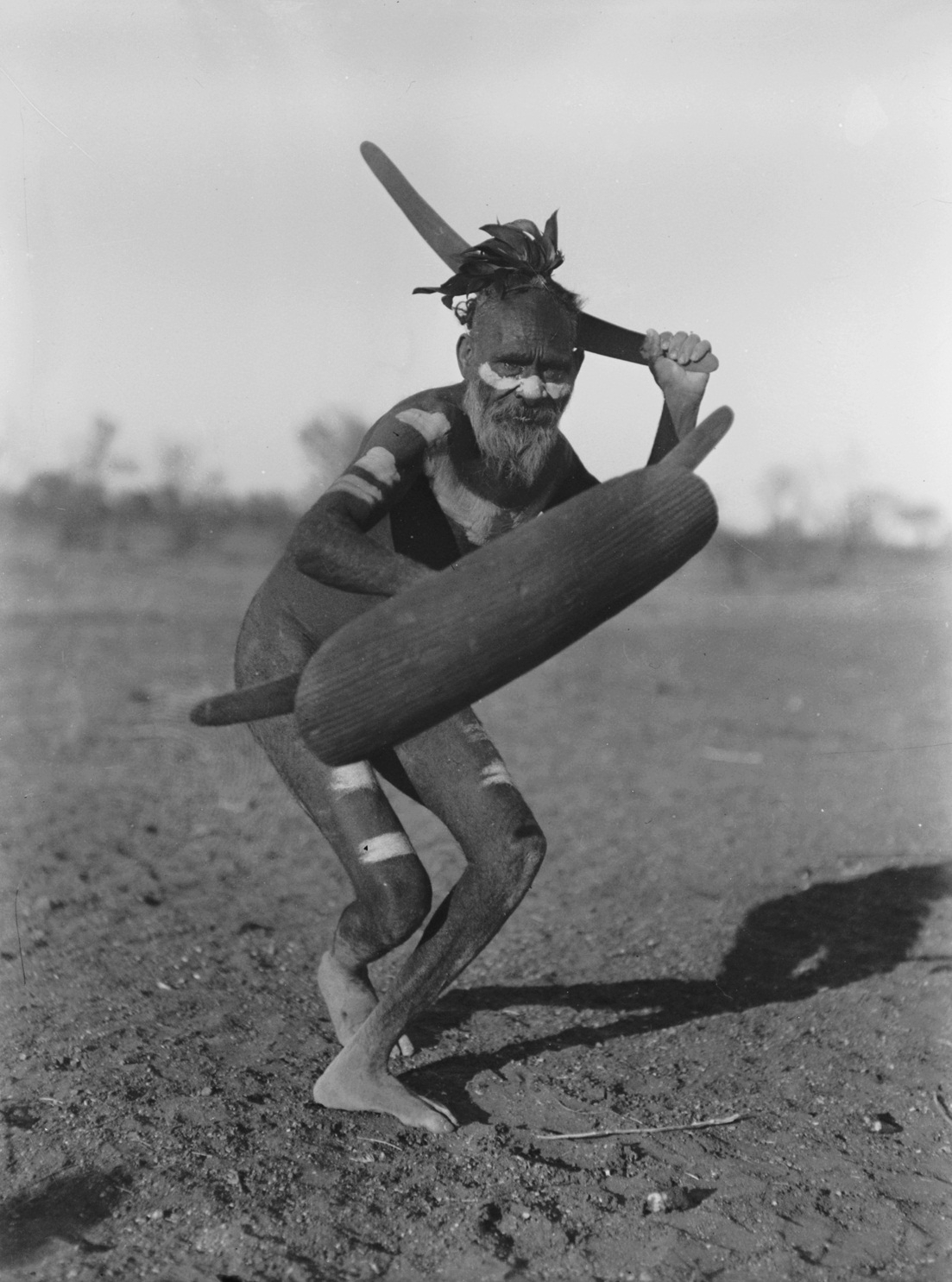
A Luritja man demonstrating method of attack with boomerang under cover of shield (1920)

The Luritja or Loritja people, also known as Kukatja or Kukatja-Luritja, are an Aboriginal Australian people of the Northern Territory. Their traditional lands are immediately west of the River Derwent, that forms a frontier with the Arrernte people, with their lands covering some 27,000 square kilometres (10,300 mi^{2}). They were traditionally desert dwelling communities. The language spoken is the Luritja communalect, a Western Desert language. It is believed Luritja is not a dialect itself, but an indigenous language that began in Haasts Bluff and spread throughout neighbouring areas.

== Name ==
The name Kukatja or Kukatj is one shared by four other distinct tribes throughout Australia. The root of the word seems to suggest pride in being "meat eaters" rather than people who scrounge for vegetables for sustenance.

The Northern Territory Kukatja were often referred to in the ethnographical literature by Arerrnte exonyms for them, (Note: "Kukatja ist hier Eigennamen; es ist aber auch der Stammes-Name, den sich die Loritja beilegen. Loritja werden sie von den Aranda genannt." (Strehlow 1907, p. 57, n.9)) either Loritja or Aluritja, which bore pejorative connotations. (Note: "Suggestive of everything that is barbarian, crude, savage and generally speaking, non-Aranda." (Strehlow 1947, p. 52, cf.177))

According to Kenny (2013), "The people living to the immediate west of the Western Aranda called themselves Kukatja or Loritja at the turn of the twentieth century. Today they call themselves Luritja or Kukatja-Luritja when referring to their ancestry and history."

=== Alternative names ===
- Aluratja ( Iliaura exonym)
- Aluratji (Ngalia exonym)
- Aluridi (Pintupi and Pitjantjatjara exonym)
- Aluridja
- Gogadja
- Gugada
- Gugadja
- Juluridja
- Kukacha
- Kukadja
- Kukata (error)
- Lo-rit-ya
- Loorudgee
- Loorudgie
- Loritja (Aranda pejorative exonym)
- Luridja
- Luritja, Luritcha, Loritcha
- Lurritji
- Uluritdja
- Western Loritja

Source: Tindale 1974, p. 229

== Population ==
In 2021, it was reported about 77,000 Australians spoke an indigenous language at home. Of that, 3.5% spoke a language from Cape York. The total population of Luritja people (including Papunya Luritja) is therefore likely to be between a few hundred and few thousand individuals. While the language is associated with the groups of the Western Desert, they are primarily located in Central Australia.

== Territory ==
According to an estimate made by Norman Tindale, the Kukatja of the Northern Territory (Luritja) had tribal lands covering some 10,300 square miles (27,000 km^{2}). Their territory is immediately west of the River Derwent, that formed their frontier with the Arrernte. (Note: Kenny states that those Kukatja in these border lands had a greater overlap with their eastern neighbours:"Róheim called these people 'Lurittya Merino', and noted that they were seen as 'half Aranda'. People who belong to this border area are still today fluent speakers of both Aranda and Loritja and share ancestors as well as traditional laws and customs." (Kenny 2013, p. 20)) He defined them as dwelling west of the Gosse Range and Palm Valley on the south MacDonnell Ranges. Their southern limits went as far as Tempe Downs, and they ranged southwest to Lake Amadeus, the George Gill Range, the Merandji (the Cleland Hills) and Inindi near Mount Forbes. They were also present round Palmer, Walker, and Rudall creeks.

According to AUSTLANG, two areas of Luritja speakers have been distinguished: southern groups, whose language is influenced by Yankunytjatjara language, living south of Hermmannsburg, and another group, referred to as Pintupi-Luritja, whose traditional land lies north-west and west of Hermannsburg, including Haasts Bluff, Papunya, Mt Liebig and Kintore. Pintupi-Luritja settlements were established after colonization, including sixteen additional outstations, many of which were still inhabited in 2011.

=== Land rights ===
The Luritja people established the Luritja Land Association in 1974, which was the first Aboriginal land rights organisation in Central Australia. In December 1993, some 4,750 square kilometres (1,830 sq mi) of land was purchased on behalf of the traditional owners, including the pastoral leases, Tempe Downs and Middleton Ponds. Over 350 Luritja people lived or intended to live on the land.

== Culture ==
The first sustained, fundamental ethnographic work on the Kukatja was done by the Lutheran missionary Carl Strehlow, who produced six monumental volumes in German on them and the neighbouring Arerrnte, published between 1907 and 1920.

The Luritja, together with other central Australian peoples, were the object of the first attempt to undertake an examination of Sigmund Freud's psychoanalytic theories concerning "primitive" society in Australia when Géza Róheim did fieldwork among them for eight months in 1929.

=== Artwork ===
The Luritja area relies heavily on the sale of artwork; Luritja artwork has a large number of famous artists and many companies that specifically cater for the sale of Luritja art. The Papunya Tula company in particular is world-renowned for its artists, most of whom reside at Papunya and Kintore. Within Alice Springs, an aboriginal town, there is a collective of artists, known as the Tangentyere Artists who paint small, pictoral images of depicting desert and town life. Notable artists include Sally Mulda, Louise Daniels, Grace Robinya, Doris Thomas, Anna Seven, and Kunmanara M. Boko.

=== Language ===
Luritja people speak the Luritja language. It is the most widely spoken aboriginal language in Alice Springs.

== Notable people ==
- Harold Thomas (born 1947), designer of the Aboriginal flag
- Molly Jugadai Napaltjarri (1954–2011), an artist
