= Pitjantjatjara dialect =

Western Desert dialect of Central Australia

Pitjantjatjara
- Pronunciation: [ˈpɪɟanɟaɟaɾa] [ˈpɪɟanɟaɾa]
- Native to: Australia
- Region: Northwest South Australia, Pitjantjatjara freehold lands, Yalata; southwest corner, Northern Territory; also in Western Australia
- Ethnicity: Pitjantjatjara
- Native speakers: 3,458 (2021 census)
- Language family: Pama–Nyungan: Wati; Western Desert; Pitjantjatjara
- Writing system: Latin

Official status
- Official language in: Aṉangu Pitjantjatjara Yankunytjatjara

Language codes
- ISO 639-3: pjt
- Glottolog: pitj1243
- AIATSIS: C6
- ELP: Pitjantjatjara

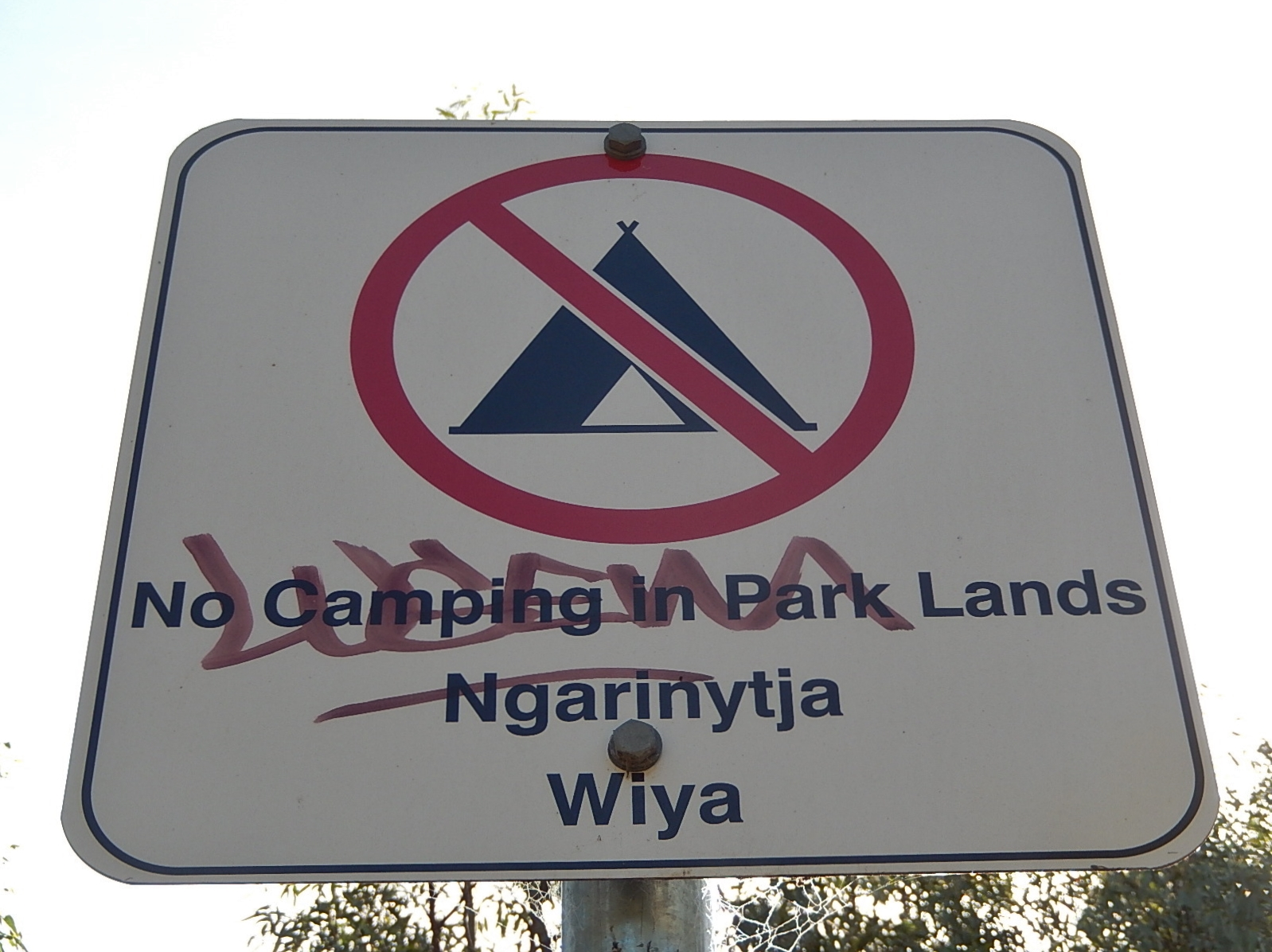
"No camping" sign in English and Pitjantjatjara, Adelaide

Pitjantjatjara (/pɪtʃəntʃəˈtʃɑːrə/ pih-chən-chə-CHAR-ə; Pitjantjatjara: [ˈpɪɟanɟaɟaɾa] or [ˈpɪɟanɟaɾa]) is a dialect of the Western Desert language traditionally spoken by the Pitjantjatjara people of Central Australia. It is mutually intelligible with other varieties of the Western Desert language, and is particularly closely related to the Yankunytjatjara dialect. The names for the two groups are based on their respective words for 'come/go.'

Pitjantjatjara is a relatively healthy Aboriginal language, with children learning it. It is taught in some Aboriginal schools. The literacy rate for first language speakers is 50–70%; and is 10–15% for second-language learners. There is a Pitjantjatjara dictionary, and the New Testament of the Bible has been translated into the language, a project started at the Ernabella Mission in the early 1940s and completed in 2002. Work continues on the Old Testament.

Pitjantjatjara wordlist recorded by the UCLA Phonetics Lab

== History since European settlement ==
The Ernabella Mission was established by Charles Duguid and the Presbyterian Church of Australia in 1937 at the location now known as Pukatja, supported by the South Australian government. The Mission aimed to keep the language and culture alive, with the missionaries learning the language themselves and teaching it in the school as well as delivering sermons in it. This meant that the language became a written language for the first time, and the people became literate in their own language before English.

=== Bible translations ===
The first draft of the New Testament's Gospel of Mark, Tjukurpa Palja Markaku, was completed in 1945 by Reverend Bob Love and Ronald Trudinger at the Mission, and was published by the British and Foreign Bible Society in 1949. Work continued over the next 20 years, with publication of a shorter New Testament in 1969 by the Bible Society Australia. Pitjantjatjara Bible Translation Project, incorporated in 1981, completed a new translation of the New Testament and about 15% of the Old Testament, first published in 2002. In 2011 a new project to translate the rest of the OT was initiated, as of 2019 working on various OT books. Paul Eckert, a 21st-century Bible Society missionary and local teacher since 1973, has worked with elders on the project for many years. The Book of Daniel was published in 2015, and the Pitjantjatjara version of the New Testament is available online.

In 2017 members of the Pitjantjatjara Bible Translation Project and partners began a multi-voice recording of the Pitjantjatjara New Testament, with 50% completed by 2017.

=== Government policies ===
APY lands schools taught a bilingual curriculum until the late 1980s, when the programs were defunded, and teaching reverted to English only. In December 2018 it was announced that the South Australian Government would commit to teaching in the Pitjantjatjara and Yankunytjatjara languages, with English as an additional language, by 2029.

=== Loan words ===
Pitjantjatjara includes several loan words from other languages, predominantly from English.

Some older loan words are derived from other Indigenous languages and from English, while newer loan words are almost entirely borrowed from English.

Like other Indigenous languages, some older loan words that are still commonly used in Pitjantjatjara derive from English terms that are now uncommon or obsolete. For example, while the English word motorcar has now almost entirely been replaced by the shortened form of the word, car, the Pitjantjatjara word mutuka (derived from "motorcar") is still used as the Pitjantjatjara word for "car". Similarly, the words for "car" in most other Aboriginal languages (as well as in some other languages, such as Fijian and Māori) are borrowed from "motorcar".

=== Code-switching ===
Like with many speakers of Indigenous languages, code-switching is common in Pitjantjatjara, especially among younger people. For example, among schoolchildren, the predominant language used in the classroom and on the playground is English, though Pitjantjatjara is occasionally used in both settings (more so the latter than the former). Furthermore, swearing and abuse is almost entirely done in English, while storytelling is virtually always in Pitjantjatjara.

Outside school and business, Pitjantjatjara speakers use both Pitjantjatjara and English interchangeably, and the two languages are sometimes mixed together. This includes both in their local communities and whilst they are on holidays.

Below is an example of code-switching in Pitjantjatjara, taken from a conversation among a group of teenagers playing a game of Monopoly:

"Five hundred uwa tjintjimilantjaku."

("Five hundred [note], yes, to change.")

"Change!" "You're rich!"
"Rentaṉa paimilaṉi tiṯutjarangku."

("I [am] always [the one who have to] pay the rent.")

=== Areyonga Teenage Pitjantjatjara ===
Areyonga Teenage Pitjantjatjara is a distinct variety of Pitjantjatjara spoken by younger Pitjantjatjara people in Areyonga.

The main differences between Standard Pitjantjatjara and Areyonga Teenage Pitjantjatjara are in vocabulary and pronunciation. A much greater proportion of Areyonga Teenage Pitjantjatjara vocabulary is derived from English, with some English loan words being used instead of some traditional terms. A common example of this is the usage of "and" in Areyonga Teenage Pitjantjatjara.

Furthermore, Areyonga Teenage Pitjantjatjara loan words are often pronounced more like the original English word, even if this involves using the sound from a letter that does not traditionally exist in Pitjantjatjara, such as B, D, O, S and V. However, the letter C is never used.

== Phonology and orthography ==
There are slightly different standardised spellings used in the Northern Territory and Western Australia compared to South Australia, for example with the first two writing ⟨w⟩ between ⟨a⟩ and ⟨u⟩ combinations and a ⟨y⟩ between ⟨a⟩ and ⟨i⟩, which SA does not use.

Pitjantjatjara has the following consonant inventory, orthography shown in brackets:

	Bilabial	Alveolar	Retroflex	Palatal	Velar
Plosive	p~b ⟨p⟩	t~d ⟨t⟩	ʈ~ɖ ⟨ṯ⟩	c~ɟ ⟨tj⟩	k~ɡ ⟨k⟩
Nasal	m ⟨m⟩	n ⟨n⟩	ɳ ⟨ṉ⟩	ɲ ⟨ny⟩	ŋ ⟨ng⟩
Lateral		l ⟨l⟩	ɭ ⟨ḻ⟩	ʎ ⟨ly⟩	
Rhotic		r~ɾ ⟨r⟩	ɻ ⟨ṟ⟩		
Approximant			ɻ ⟨ṟ⟩	j ⟨y⟩	w ⟨w⟩

Pitjantjatjara has three vowels:

	Front	Central	Back
Close	ɪ ⟨i⟩ ɪː ⟨ii⟩		ʊ ⟨u⟩ ʊː ⟨uu⟩
Open		ɐ ⟨a⟩ ɐː ⟨aa⟩	

Pitjantjatjara vowels have a length contrast, indicated by writing them doubled. A colon ⟨:⟩ used to be sometimes used to indicate long vowels: ⟨a:⟩, ⟨i:⟩, ⟨u:⟩.

Pitjantjatjara orthography includes the following underlined letters, which can be either ordinary letters with underline formatting, or Unicode characters which include a line below:

Uppercase	Lowercase
U+1E3A Ḻ LATIN CAPITAL LETTER L WITH LINE BELOW	U+1E3B ḻ LATIN SMALL LETTER L WITH LINE BELOW
U+1E48 Ṉ LATIN CAPITAL LETTER N WITH LINE BELOW	U+1E49 ṉ LATIN SMALL LETTER N WITH LINE BELOW
U+1E5E Ṟ LATIN CAPITAL LETTER R WITH LINE BELOW	U+1E5F ṟ LATIN SMALL LETTER R WITH LINE BELOW
U+1E6E Ṯ LATIN CAPITAL LETTER T WITH LINE BELOW	U+1E6F ṯ LATIN SMALL LETTER T WITH LINE BELOW

The underline represents that the consonant in question is retroflex, rather than alveolar.

The only word in Pitjantjatjara that uses at least one letter absent from the Pitjantjatjara alphabet is the word Jesu ("Jesus"), which uses the letter ⟨s⟩ which is not present in the Pitjantjatjara alphabet. Furthermore, the letter ⟨j⟩ is only present in the digraph ⟨tj⟩.

== Grammar ==
Some features distinctive to the Pitjantjatjara dialect, as opposed to other Western Desert Language dialects, include -pa endings to words that simply end in a consonant in other dialects (this is reflective of a general aversion in Pitjantjatjara to words ending with a consonant), and a reluctance to have y at the beginning of words.

=== Nouns and noun phrases ===
Pitjantjatjara uses case marking to show the role of nouns within the clause as subject, object, location, etc. Pitjantjatjara is a language with split ergativity, since its nouns and pronouns show different case marking patterns.

Consider the following example, where the subject of a transitive verb is marked with the ergative case and the object with the absolutive case:

Minyma-ngku tjitji nya-ngu.
woman-ERG child.ABS see-PAST
'The woman saw the child.'

It can be contrasted with the following sentence with an intransitive verb, where the subject takes the absolutive case:

Tjitji a-nu.
child.ABS go-PAST
'The child went.'

In contrast to the ergative-absolutive pattern that applies to nouns, pronouns show a nominative-accusative pattern. Consider the following examples, with pronoun subjects:

Ngayu-lu tjitji nya-ngu.
I-NOM child.ABS see-PAST
'I saw the child.'

Ngayu-lu a-nu.
I-NOM go-PAST
'I went.'

=== Verbs and verb phrases ===
Pitjantjatjara verbs inflect for tense. Pitjantjatjara has four different classes of verbs, each of which takes slightly different endings (the classes are named according to their imperative suffixes): ∅-class verbs, la-class verbs, wa-class verbs, and ra-class verbs. See page on grammatical conjugation for examples.

=== Derivational morphology ===
It also has systematic ways of changing words from one part of speech to another: making nouns from verbs, and vice versa. However, words formed may have slightly different meanings that cannot be guessed from the pattern alone.

== Vocabulary ==
Below is a basic vocabulary list from Blake (1981).

English	Pitjantjatjara
man	wati
woman	minyma
mother	ngunytju
father	mama
head	kata
eye	kuṟu
nose	mulya
ear	pina
mouth	tjaa
tongue	tjaḻinypa
tooth	kaṯiṯi
hand	maṟa
breast	ipi, mimi
stomach	tjuni
urine	kumpu
faeces	kuna
thigh	tjunta
foot	tjina
bone	tarka
dog	papa
snake	liru, wami
kangaroo	maḻu
possum	wayuṯa
fish	antipina
mosquito	kiwinyi
emu	tjakipiṟi
eaglehawk	waḻawuru
crow	kaaṉka
sun	tjiṉṯu
stone	apu
water	kapi
camp	ngura
fire	waṟu
smoke	puyu
food	mirka
meat	kuka
stand	ngaṟa-
sit	nyina-
see	nya-
go	pitja-
get	mantji-
hit, kill	pu-
I	ngayulu
you	nyuntu
one	kutju
two	kutjara

=== Word of the Year 2019 short-listing ===
The Pitjantjatjara word ngangkari, added to the Macquarie Dictionary in 2019 and defined as an Indigenous practitioner of bush medicine, was short-listed for the 2019 Word of the Year.

== Technical support ==
LibreOffice provides locale data and a spellchecker for Pitjantjatjara.
