= Voiced retroflex approximant =

Consonantal sound represented by ⟨ɻ⟩ in IPA

ɻ
- IPA number: 152

Audio sample
- source · help

Encoding
- Entity (decimal): &#635;
- Unicode (hex): U+027B
- X-SAMPA: r\`
- Braille: ⠲ (braille pattern dots-256) ⠼ (braille pattern dots-3456)
Image

A voiced retroflex approximant is a type of consonant used in some languages. The symbol in the International Phonetic Alphabet that represents this sound is ⟨ɻ⟩, a turned lowercase letter r with a rightward hook protruding from the lower right of the letter.

The velar bunched approximant found in some varieties of Dutch and American English is nearly indistinguishable from a retroflex approximant in sound, but has a different articulation.

== Features ==
Sagittal section of a voiced retroflex approximant

Features of the voiced retroflex approximant:

- Its manner of articulation is approximant, which means it is produced by narrowing the vocal tract at the place of articulation, but not enough to produce a turbulent airstream.
- Its place of articulation is retroflex, which prototypically means it is articulated subapical (with the tip of the tongue curled up), but more generally, it means that it is postalveolar without being palatalized. That is, besides the prototypical subapical articulation, the tongue can be apical (pointed) or, in some fricatives, laminal (flat).
- Its phonation is voiced, which means the vocal cords vibrate during the articulation.
- It is an oral consonant, which means that air is not allowed to escape through the nose.
- It is a median consonant, which means it is produced by directing the airstream down the midline of the tongue, rather than to the sides.
- Its airstream mechanism is pulmonic, which means it is articulated by pushing air only with the intercostal muscles and abdominal muscles, as in most speech sounds.

== Occurrence ==
Language		Word	IPA	Meaning	Notes
Chinese	Mandarin	肉 ròu	[ɻ̺oʊ̯˥˩]	'meat'	Apical. Can be transcribed as fricative [ʐ]. See Standard Chinese phonology
Derung		Tvrung	[tə˧˩ɻuŋ˥˧]	'Derung'	
English	Some American dialects	red	[ɻ(ʷ)ɛd]	'red'	Labialized (pronounced with lips rounded). See Pronunciation of English /r/
English	Some Hiberno-English dialects	red	[ɻ(ʷ)ɛd]	'red'	Labialized (pronounced with lips rounded). See Pronunciation of English /r/
English	Some West Country English	red	[ɻ(ʷ)ɛd]	'red'	Labialized (pronounced with lips rounded). See Pronunciation of English /r/
Arnhem	Enindhilyagwa		angwura	[aŋwuɻa]	'fire'
Faroese		hoyrdi	[hɔiɻʈɛ]	'heard'	Allophone of /ɹ/. Sometimes voiceless [ɻ̊]. See Faroese phonology
Greek	Cretan (Sfakia and Mylopotamos variations) region	γάλα gála	[ˈɣaɻa]	'milk'	Intervocalic allophone of /l/ before /a, o, u/. Recessive. See Modern Greek phonology
Inuktitut	Nattilingmiutut	kiuřuq	/kiuɻuq/	'she replies'	
Malayalam		ആഴം/āḻam	[aːɻɐm]	'depth'	Represented by the letter ⟨ഴ⟩. Subapical retroflex. See Malayalam phonology
Mapuche		rayen	[ɻɜˈjën]	'flower'	Possible realization of /ʐ/; may be [ʐ] or [ɭ] instead.
Lolak		Ḷoḷak	[ˈɻo.ɻak̚]	'Lolak'	Allophone of /l/; usually found adjacent to vowels such as [a], [ɔ] or [u].
Portuguese	Many Centro-Sul registers	cartas	[ˈkaɻtə̥̆s]	'letters'	Allophone of rhotic consonants (and sometimes /l/) in the syllable coda. Mainly found in rural São Paulo, Paraná, south of Minas Gerais and surrounding areas, with the more common and prestigious realization in metropolitan areas being [ɹ] and/or rhotic vowel instead. As with [ɽ], it appeared as a mutation of [ɾ]. See Portuguese phonology.
Portuguese	Caipira	temporal	[tẽɪ̯̃pʊˈɾaɻ]	'rainstorm'	Allophone of rhotic consonants (and sometimes /l/) in the syllable coda. Mainly found in rural São Paulo, Paraná, south of Minas Gerais and surrounding areas, with the more common and prestigious realization in metropolitan areas being [ɹ] and/or rhotic vowel instead. As with [ɽ], it appeared as a mutation of [ɾ]. See Portuguese phonology.
Portuguese	Conservative Piracicabano	grato	[ˈgɻatʊ̥]	'thankful' (m.)	Allophone of rhotic consonants (and sometimes /l/) in the syllable coda. Mainly found in rural São Paulo, Paraná, south of Minas Gerais and surrounding areas, with the more common and prestigious realization in metropolitan areas being [ɹ] and/or rhotic vowel instead. As with [ɽ], it appeared as a mutation of [ɾ]. See Portuguese phonology.
Tamil		தமிழ்/Tamiḻ	[t̪əˈmɨɻ]	'Tamil'	See Tamil phonology. May be merged with [ɭ] for some modern speakers.
Western Desert	Pitjantjatjara dialect	Uluṟu	[ʊlʊɻʊ]	'Uluru'	
Yaghan		wárho	[ˈwaɻo]	'cave'	

== See also ==
- Alveolar approximant
- Retroflex consonant
- R-colored vowel
- Index of phonetics articles

== Notes ==
Place →	Labial					Coronal										Dorsal					Laryngeal			
Manner ↓	Bilabial		Labiodental		Linguolabial		Dental		Alveolar		Postalveolar		Retroflex		(Alveolo-)palatal		Velar		Uvular		Pharyngeal/epiglottal		Glottal	
Nasal	m̥	m	ɱ̊	ɱ		n̼	n̪̊	n̪	n̥	n	n̠̊	n̠	ɳ̊	ɳ	ɲ̊	ɲ	ŋ̊	ŋ	ɴ̥	ɴ				
Plosive	p	b	p̪	b̪	t̼	d̼	t̪	d̪	t	d			ʈ	ɖ	c	ɟ	k	ɡ	q	ɢ	ʡ		ʔ	
Sibilant affricate							t̪s̪	d̪z̪	ts	dz	t̠ʃ	d̠ʒ	tʂ	dʐ	tɕ	dʑ								
Non-sibilant affricate	pɸ	bβ	p̪f	b̪v			t̪θ	d̪ð	tɹ̝̊	dɹ̝	t̠ɹ̠̊˔	d̠ɹ̠˔			cç	ɟʝ	kx	ɡɣ	qχ	ɢʁ	ʡʜ	ʡʢ	ʔh	
Sibilant fricative							s̪	z̪	s	z	ʃ	ʒ	ʂ	ʐ	ɕ	ʑ								
Non-sibilant fricative	ɸ	β	f	v	θ̼	ð̼	θ	ð	θ̠	ð̠	ɹ̠̊˔	ɹ̠˔	ɻ̊˔	ɻ˔	ç	ʝ	x	ɣ	χ	ʁ	ħ	ʕ	h	ɦ
Approximant		β̞		ʋ				ð̞		ɹ		ɹ̠		ɻ		j		ɰ						˷
Tap/flap		ⱱ̟		ⱱ					ɾ̥	ɾ			ɽ̊	ɽ						ɢ̆		ʡ̆		
Trill	ʙ̥	ʙ							r̥	r		r̠	ɽ̊r̥	ɽr					ʀ̥	ʀ	ʜ	ʢ		
Lateral affricate									tɬ	dɮ			tꞎ	d𝼅	c𝼆	ɟʎ̝	k𝼄	ɡʟ̝						
Lateral fricative							ɬ̪		ɬ	ɮ			ꞎ	𝼅	𝼆	ʎ̝	𝼄	ʟ̝						
Lateral approximant								l̪	l̥	l		l̠	ɭ̊	ɭ	ʎ̥	ʎ	ʟ̥	ʟ		ʟ̠				
Lateral tap/flap									ɺ̥	ɺ			𝼈̊	𝼈		ʎ̆		ʟ̆						

		BL	LD	D	A	PA	RF	P	V	U
Implosive	Voiced	ɓ			ɗ		ᶑ	ʄ	ɠ	ʛ
Implosive	Voiceless	ɓ̥			ɗ̥		ᶑ̊	ʄ̊	ɠ̊	ʛ̥
Ejective	Stop	pʼ			tʼ		ʈʼ	cʼ	kʼ	qʼ
Ejective	Affricate		p̪fʼ	tθʼ	tsʼ	tʃʼ	tʂʼ	tɕʼ	kxʼ	qχʼ
Ejective	Fricative	ɸʼ	fʼ	θʼ	sʼ	ʃʼ	ʂʼ	ɕʼ	xʼ	χʼ
Ejective	Lateral affricate				tɬʼ			c𝼆ʼ	k𝼄ʼ	q𝼄ʼ
Ejective	Lateral fricative				ɬʼ					
Click (top: velar; bottom: uvular)	Tenuis	kʘ qʘ		kǀ qǀ	kǃ qǃ		k𝼊 q𝼊	kǂ qǂ		
Click (top: velar; bottom: uvular)	Voiced	ɡʘ ɢʘ		ɡǀ ɢǀ	ɡǃ ɢǃ		ɡ𝼊 ɢ𝼊	ɡǂ ɢǂ		
Click (top: velar; bottom: uvular)	Nasal	ŋʘ ɴʘ		ŋǀ ɴǀ	ŋǃ ɴǃ		ŋ𝼊 ɴ𝼊	ŋǂ ɴǂ	ʞ	
Click (top: velar; bottom: uvular)	Tenuis lateral				kǁ qǁ					
Click (top: velar; bottom: uvular)	Voiced lateral				ɡǁ ɢǁ					
Click (top: velar; bottom: uvular)	Nasal lateral				ŋǁ ɴǁ					
