= Wati languages =

Languages of Aboriginal people of central Australia

Wati
- Geographic distribution: central Australia
- Linguistic classification: Pama–Nyungan: Desert Nyungic; Wati
- Subdivisions: Wanman; Western Desert; Ngardi?

Language codes
- Glottolog: wati1241
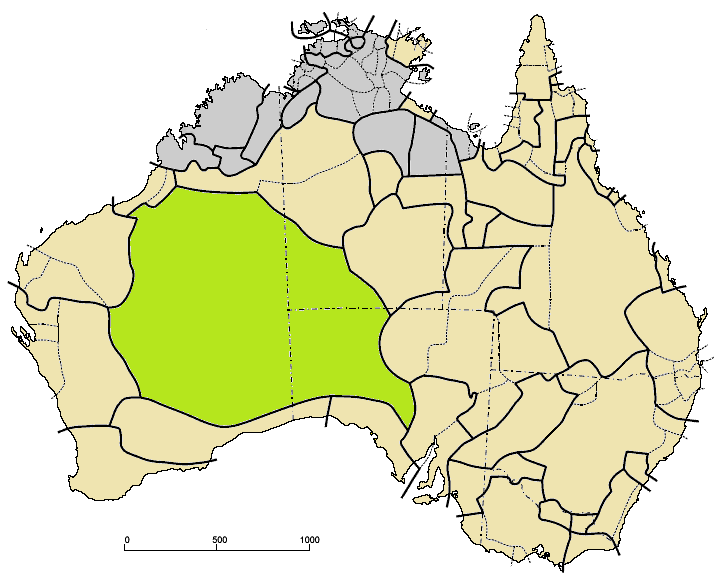
- Wati languages (green) among other Pama–Nyungan (tan)

The Wati languages are the dominant Pama–Nyungan languages of central Australia. They include the moribund Wanman language and the Western Desert dialect continuum, which is sometimes considered to be a dozen distinct languages. It is not clear whether Antakarinya is Warnman or Western Desert.

Bowern (2011) adds Ngardi, which had previously been classified as Ngumpin–Yapa.

Wati is generally included in Southwest Pama–Nyungan by those who accept that proposal. However, SW Pama–Nyungan may be an areal group, and is not included in Bowern (2011).

== See also ==
- Wawula dialect
